= 2025 AdventHealth 400 =

NASCAR Cup Series race

Race details
- Race 12 of 36 in the 2025 NASCAR Cup Series
- Date: May 11, 2025
- Location: Kansas Speedway in Kansas City, Kansas, U.S.
- Course: Permanent racing facility
- Course length: 1.5 miles (2.4 km)
- Distance: 267 laps, 400.5 mi (644.542 km)
- Average speed: 129.74 miles per hour (208.80 km/h)

Pole position
Driver	Kyle Larson	Hendrick Motorsports
- Time: 29.391

Most laps led
Driver	Kyle Larson	Hendrick Motorsports
- Laps: 221

Fastest lap
Driver	Kyle Larson	Hendrick Motorsports
- Time: 30.288

Winner
No. 5	Kyle Larson	Hendrick Motorsports

Television in the United States
- Network: FS1
- Announcers: Mike Joy, Clint Bowyer, and Kevin Harvick
- Nielsen ratings: 2.319 million

Radio in the United States
- Radio: MRN
- Booth announcers: Kurt Becker, Mike Bagley, and Todd Gordon
- Turn announcers: Dave Moody (1 & 2) and Tim Catafalmo (3 & 4)

The 2025 AdventHealth 400 was a NASCAR Cup Series race held on May 11, 2025, at Kansas Speedway in Kansas City, Kansas. Contested over 267 laps on the 1.5-mile (2.4 km) asphalt speedway, it was the 12th race of the 2025 NASCAR Cup Series season.

Kyle Larson won the race. Christopher Bell finished 2nd, and Ryan Blaney finished 3rd. Chase Briscoe and Alex Bowman rounded out the top five, and Josh Berry, Ryan Preece, Chris Buescher, Joey Logano, and John Hunter Nemechek rounded out the top ten.

== Report ==
=== Background ===
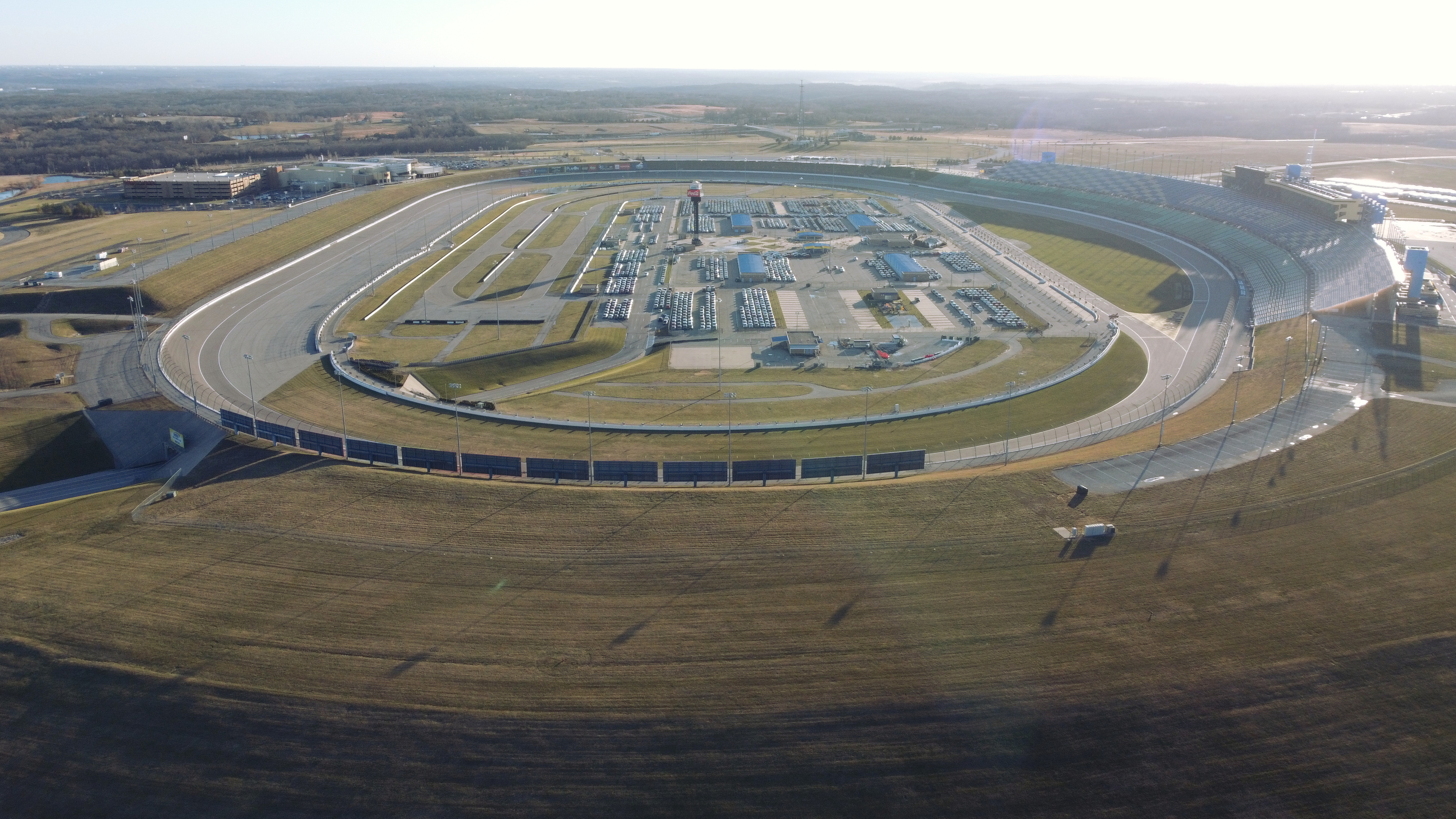
The layout of Kansas Speedway, the venue where the race was held.

Kansas Speedway is a 1.5-mile (2.4 km) tri-oval race track in Kansas City, Kansas. It was built in 2001 and hosts two annual NASCAR race weekends. The NTT IndyCar Series also raced there until 2011. The speedway is owned and operated by NASCAR.

==== Entry list ====
- (R) denotes rookie driver.
- (i) denotes driver who is ineligible for series driver points.

No.	Driver	Team	Manufacturer
1	Ross Chastain	Trackhouse Racing	Chevrolet
2	Austin Cindric	Team Penske	Ford
3	Austin Dillon	Richard Childress Racing	Chevrolet
4	Noah Gragson	Front Row Motorsports	Ford
5	Kyle Larson	Hendrick Motorsports	Chevrolet
6	Brad Keselowski	RFK Racing	Ford
7	Justin Haley	Spire Motorsports	Chevrolet
8	Kyle Busch	Richard Childress Racing	Chevrolet
9	Chase Elliott	Hendrick Motorsports	Chevrolet
10	Ty Dillon	Kaulig Racing	Chevrolet
11	Denny Hamlin	Joe Gibbs Racing	Toyota
12	Ryan Blaney	Team Penske	Ford
16	A. J. Allmendinger	Kaulig Racing	Chevrolet
17	Chris Buescher	RFK Racing	Ford
19	Chase Briscoe	Joe Gibbs Racing	Toyota
20	Christopher Bell	Joe Gibbs Racing	Toyota
21	Josh Berry	Wood Brothers Racing	Ford
22	Joey Logano	Team Penske	Ford
23	Bubba Wallace	23XI Racing	Toyota
24	William Byron	Hendrick Motorsports	Chevrolet
33	Jesse Love (i)	Richard Childress Racing	Chevrolet
34	Todd Gilliland	Front Row Motorsports	Ford
35	Riley Herbst (R)	23XI Racing	Toyota
38	Zane Smith	Front Row Motorsports	Ford
41	Cole Custer	Haas Factory Team	Ford
42	John Hunter Nemechek	Legacy Motor Club	Toyota
43	Erik Jones	Legacy Motor Club	Toyota
45	Tyler Reddick	23XI Racing	Toyota
47	Ricky Stenhouse Jr.	Hyak Motorsports	Chevrolet
48	Alex Bowman	Hendrick Motorsports	Chevrolet
51	Cody Ware	Rick Ware Racing	Ford
54	Ty Gibbs	Joe Gibbs Racing	Toyota
60	Ryan Preece	RFK Racing	Ford
67	Corey Heim (i)	23XI Racing	Toyota
71	Michael McDowell	Spire Motorsports	Chevrolet
77	Carson Hocevar	Spire Motorsports	Chevrolet
88	Shane van Gisbergen (R)	Trackhouse Racing	Chevrolet
99	Daniel Suárez	Trackhouse Racing	Chevrolet
Official entry list

== Practice ==
Ty Gibbs was the fastest in the practice session with a time of 29.976 seconds and a speed of 180.144 mph (289.914 km/h).

=== Practice results ===
Pos	No.	Driver	Team	Manufacturer	Time	Speed
1	54	Ty Gibbs	Joe Gibbs Racing	Toyota	29.976	180.144
2	71	Michael McDowell	Spire Motorsports	Chevrolet	30.091	179.455
3	48	Alex Bowman	Hendrick Motorsports	Chevrolet	30.104	179.378
Official practice results

== Qualifying ==
Kyle Larson scored the pole for the race with a time of 29.391 and a speed of 183.730 mph (295.685 km/h).

=== Qualifying results ===
Pos	No.	Driver	Team	Manufacturer	Time	Speed
1	5	Kyle Larson	Hendrick Motorsports	Chevrolet	29.391	183.730
2	17	Chris Buescher	RFK Racing	Ford	29.448	183.374
3	20	Christopher Bell	Joe Gibbs Racing	Toyota	29.465	183.268
4	45	Tyler Reddick	23XI Racing	Toyota	29.484	183.310
5	22	Joey Logano	Team Penske	Ford	29.529	182.871
6	54	Ty Gibbs	Joe Gibbs Racing	Toyota	29.551	182.735
7	24	William Byron	Hendrick Motorsports	Chevrolet	29.569	182.624
8	99	Daniel Suárez	Trackhouse Racing	Chevrolet	29.593	182.476
9	9	Chase Elliott	Hendrick Motorsports	Chevrolet	29.595	182.463
10	12	Ryan Blaney	Team Penske	Ford	29.596	182.457
11	71	Michael McDowell	Spire Motorsports	Chevrolet	29.613	182.352
12	7	Justin Haley	Spire Motorsports	Chevrolet	29.625	182.278
13	2	Austin Cindric	Team Penske	Ford	29.627	182.266
14	11	Denny Hamlin	Joe Gibbs Racing	Toyota	29.633	182.229
15	23	Bubba Wallace	23XI Racing	Toyota	29.634	182.223
16	43	Erik Jones	Legacy Motor Club	Toyota	29.670	182.002
17	42	John Hunter Nemechek	Legacy Motor Club	Toyota	29.674	181.977
18	38	Zane Smith	Front Row Motorsports	Ford	29.682	181.928
19	19	Chase Briscoe	Joe Gibbs Racing	Toyota	29.684	181.916
20	3	Austin Dillon	Richard Childress Racing	Chevrolet	29.705	181.788
21	48	Alex Bowman	Hendrick Motorsports	Chevrolet	29.716	181.720
22	77	Carson Hocevar	Spire Motorsports	Chevrolet	29.793	181.251
23	34	Todd Gilliland	Front Row Motorsports	Ford	29.825	181.056
24	4	Noah Gragson	Front Row Motorsports	Ford	29.840	180.965
25	35	Riley Herbst (R)	23XI Racing	Toyota	29.846	180.929
26	1	Ross Chastain	Trackhouse Racing	Chevrolet	29.847	180.923
27	47	Ricky Stenhouse Jr.	Hyak Motorsports	Chevrolet	29.851	180.898
28	67	Corey Heim (i)	23XI Racing	Toyota	29.899	180.608
29	10	Ty Dillon	Kaulig Racing	Chevrolet	29.974	180.156
30	60	Ryan Preece	RFK Racing	Ford	30.016	179.904
31	41	Cole Custer	Haas Factory Team	Ford	30.016	179.904
32	33	Jesse Love (i)	Richard Childress Racing	Chevrolet	30.070	179.581
33	16	A. J. Allmendinger	Kaulig Racing	Chevrolet	30.160	179.045
34	88	Shane van Gisbergen (R)	Trackhouse Racing	Chevrolet	30.213	178.731
35	8	Kyle Busch	Richard Childress Racing	Chevrolet	30.384	177.726
36	6	Brad Keselowski	RFK Racing	Ford	30.602	176.459
37	51	Cody Ware	Rick Ware Racing	Ford	31.152	173.344
38	21	Josh Berry	Wood Brothers Racing	Ford	31.406	171.942
Official qualifying results

== Race ==
=== Race results ===
==== Stage Results ====
Stage One Laps: 80

Pos	No	Driver	Team	Manufacturer	Points
1	5	Kyle Larson	Hendrick Motorsports	Chevrolet	10
2	9	Chase Elliott	Hendrick Motorsports	Chevrolet	9
3	20	Christopher Bell	Joe Gibbs Racing	Toyota	8
4	12	Ryan Blaney	Team Penske	Ford	7
5	2	Austin Cindric	Team Penske	Ford	6
6	48	Alex Bowman	Hendrick Motorsports	Chevrolet	5
7	11	Denny Hamlin	Joe Gibbs Racing	Toyota	4
8	60	Ryan Preece	RFK Racing	Ford	3
9	22	Joey Logano	Team Penske	Ford	2
10	38	Zane Smith	Front Row Motorsports	Ford	1
Official stage one results

Stage Two Laps: 85

Pos	No	Driver	Team	Manufacturer	Points
1	5	Kyle Larson	Hendrick Motorsports	Chevrolet	10
2	9	Chase Elliott	Hendrick Motorsports	Chevrolet	9
3	12	Ryan Blaney	Team Penske	Ford	8
4	21	Josh Berry	Wood Brothers Racing	Ford	7
5	20	Christopher Bell	Joe Gibbs Racing	Toyota	6
6	6	Brad Keselowski	RFK Racing	Ford	5
7	48	Alex Bowman	Hendrick Motorsports	Chevrolet	4
8	11	Denny Hamlin	Joe Gibbs Racing	Toyota	3
9	38	Zane Smith	Front Row Motorsports	Ford	2
10	60	Ryan Preece	RFK Racing	Ford	1
Official stage two results

=== Final Stage Results ===
Stage Three Laps: 102

Pos	Grid	No	Driver	Team	Manufacturer	Laps	Points
1	1	5	Kyle Larson	Hendrick Motorsports	Chevrolet	267	61
2	3	20	Christopher Bell	Joe Gibbs Racing	Toyota	267	49
3	10	12	Ryan Blaney	Team Penske	Ford	267	49
4	19	19	Chase Briscoe	Joe Gibbs Racing	Toyota	267	33
5	21	48	Alex Bowman	Hendrick Motorsports	Chevrolet	267	41
6	38	21	Josh Berry	Wood Brothers Racing	Ford	267	38
7	30	60	Ryan Preece	RFK Racing	Ford	267	34
8	2	17	Chris Buescher	RFK Racing	Ford	267	-31
9	5	22	Joey Logano	Team Penske	Ford	267	30
10	17	42	John Hunter Nemechek	Legacy Motor Club	Toyota	267	27
11	13	2	Austin Cindric	Team Penske	Ford	267	32
12	23	34	Todd Gilliland	Front Row Motorsports	Ford	267	25
13	28	67	Corey Heim (i)	23XI Racing	Toyota	267	0
14	24	4	Noah Gragson	Front Row Motorsports	Ford	267	23
15	9	9	Chase Elliott	Hendrick Motorsports	Chevrolet	267	40
16	18	38	Zane Smith	Front Row Motorsports	Ford	267	24
17	4	45	Tyler Reddick	23XI Racing	Toyota	267	20
18	26	1	Ross Chastain	Trackhouse Racing	Chevrolet	267	19
19	27	47	Ricky Stenhouse Jr.	Hyak Motorsports	Chevrolet	267	18
20	34	88	Shane van Gisbergen (R)	Trackhouse Racing	Chevrolet	267	17
21	35	8	Kyle Busch	Richard Childress Racing	Chevrolet	266	16
22	20	3	Austin Dillon	Richard Childress Racing	Chevrolet	266	15
23	11	71	Michael McDowell	Spire Motorsports	Chevrolet	266	14
24	7	24	William Byron	Hendrick Motorsports	Chevrolet	266	13
25	31	41	Cole Custer	Haas Factory Team	Ford	265	12
26	22	77	Carson Hocevar	Spire Motorsports	Chevrolet	265	11
27	25	35	Riley Herbst (R)	23XI Racing	Toyota	265	10
28	6	54	Ty Gibbs	Joe Gibbs Racing	Toyota	264	9
29	32	33	Jesse Love (i)	Richard Childress Racing	Chevrolet	264	0
30	37	51	Cody Ware	Rick Ware Racing	Ford	261	7
31	12	7	Justin Haley	Spire Motorsports	Chevrolet	255	6
32	16	43	Erik Jones	Legacy Motor Club	Toyota	218	5
33	15	23	Bubba Wallace	23XI Racing	Toyota	212	4
34	8	99	Daniel Suárez	Trackhouse Racing	Chevrolet	201	3
35	29	10	Ty Dillon	Kaulig Racing	Chevrolet	197	2
36	14	11	Denny Hamlin	Joe Gibbs Racing	Toyota	196	8
37	36	6	Brad Keselowski	RFK Racing	Ford	194	6
38	33	16	A. J. Allmendinger	Kaulig Racing	Chevrolet	7	1
Official race results

=== Race statistics ===
- Lead changes: 15 among 9 different drivers
- Cautions/Laps: 7 for 37
- Red flags: 0
- Time of race: 3 hours, 5 minutes and 13 seconds
- Average speed: 129.74 miles per hour (208.80 km/h)

== Media ==
=== Television ===
Fox Sports covered their 13th race at the Kansas Speedway. Mike Joy, Clint Bowyer and three-time Kansas winner Kevin Harvick called the race from the broadcast booth. Jamie Little, Regan Smith and Josh Sims handled pit road for the television side, and Larry McReynolds provided insight on-site during the race.

FS1
Booth announcers	Pit reporters	In-race analyst
Lap-by-lap: Mike Joy; Color-commentator: Clint Bowyer; Color-commentator: Kevin Harvick	Jamie Little; Regan Smith; Josh Sims	Larry McReynolds

=== Radio ===
MRN had the radio call for the race which was also simulcasted on Sirius XM NASCAR Radio. Kurt Becker, Mike Bagley, and former crew chief Todd Gordon called the race in the booth when the field will race through the tri-oval. Dave Moody covered the race from the Sunoco spotters stand outside turn 2 when the field will race through turns 1 and 2. Tim Catafalmo called the race from a platform outside turn 4. Lead MRN Pit Reporter Steve Post, Jacklyn Drake, and Jason Toy worked pit road for the radio side.

MRN
Booth announcers	Turn announcers	Pit reporters
Lead announcer: Kurt Becker; Announcer: Mike Bagley; Announcer: Todd Gordon	Turns 1 & 2: Dave Moody; Turns 3 & 4: Tim Catafalmo	Steve Post; Jacklyn Drake; Jason Toy

== Standings after the race ==
Drivers' Championship standings

	Pos	Driver	Points
1	1	Kyle Larson	469
1	2	William Byron	434 (–35)
3	3	Christopher Bell	384 (–85)
	4	Chase Elliott	378 (–91)
2	5	Ryan Blaney	362 (–107)
1	6	Tyler Reddick	357 (–112)
4	7	Denny Hamlin	346 (–123)
2	8	Alex Bowman	325 (–144)
	9	Joey Logano	318 (–151)
2	10	Bubba Wallace	310 (–159)
	11	Ross Chastain	300 (–169)
	12	Chris Buescher	284 (–185)
	13	Chase Briscoe	278 (–191)
	14	Austin Cindric	273 (–196)
	15	Ricky Stenhouse Jr.	258 (–211)
2	16	Ryan Preece	251 (–218)
Official driver's standings

Manufacturers' Championship standings

Pos	Manufacturer	Points
1	Chevrolet	437
2	Toyota	425 (–12)
3	Ford	405 (–32)

- Note: Only the first 16 positions are included for the driver standings.
- . – Driver has clinched a position in the NASCAR Cup Series playoffs.

Previous race: 2025 Würth 400	NASCAR Cup Series; 2025 season	Next race: 2025 Coca-Cola 600 (points); 2025 NASCAR All-Star Race (exhibition)
