= 2026 Go Bowling at The Glen =

NASCAR Cup Series race

Race details
- Race 12 of 36 in the 2026 NASCAR Cup Series
- Date: May 10, 2026
- Location: Watkins Glen International in Watkins Glen, New York
- Course: Permanent racing facility
- Course length: 2.54 miles (2.48 km)
- Distance: 100 laps, 245 mi (394.2 km)
- Weather: Partially cloudy 61 °F (16 °C)
- Average speed: 98.536 miles per hour (158.578 km/h)

Pole position
| Driver | Shane van Gisbergen | Trackhouse Racing |
- Time: 1:11.165

Most laps led
| Driver | Shane van Gisbergen | Trackhouse Racing |
- Laps: 74

Fastest lap
| Driver | Connor Zilisch | Trackhouse Racing |
- Time: 1:12.541

Winner
| No. 97 | Shane van Gisbergen | Trackhouse Racing |

Television in the United States
- Network: FS1
- Announcers: Mike Joy, Clint Bowyer, and Kevin Harvick

Radio in the United States
- Radio: MRN
- Booth announcers: Alex Hayden, Mike Bagley and Todd Gordon
- Turn announcers: Dave Moody (Esses), Kyle Rickey (Turn 5) and Tim Catalfalmo (Turns 6–7)

The 2026 Go Bowling at The Glen was an NASCAR Cup Series race held on May 10, 2026, at Watkins Glen International in Watkins Glen, New York. Contested over 100 laps on the 2.45-mile (3.94 km) road course, it was the 12th race of the 2026 NASCAR Cup Series season. This was the final points Cup career race of Kyle Busch, before his death on May 21, 2026.

Shane van Gisbergen won the race. Michael McDowell finished 2nd, and Ty Gibbs finished 3rd. Chase Briscoe and Tyler Reddick rounded out the top five, and Austin Dillon, A. J. Allmendinger, Kyle Busch, Austin Cindric, and John Hunter Nemechek rounded out the top ten.

== Report ==
=== Background ===
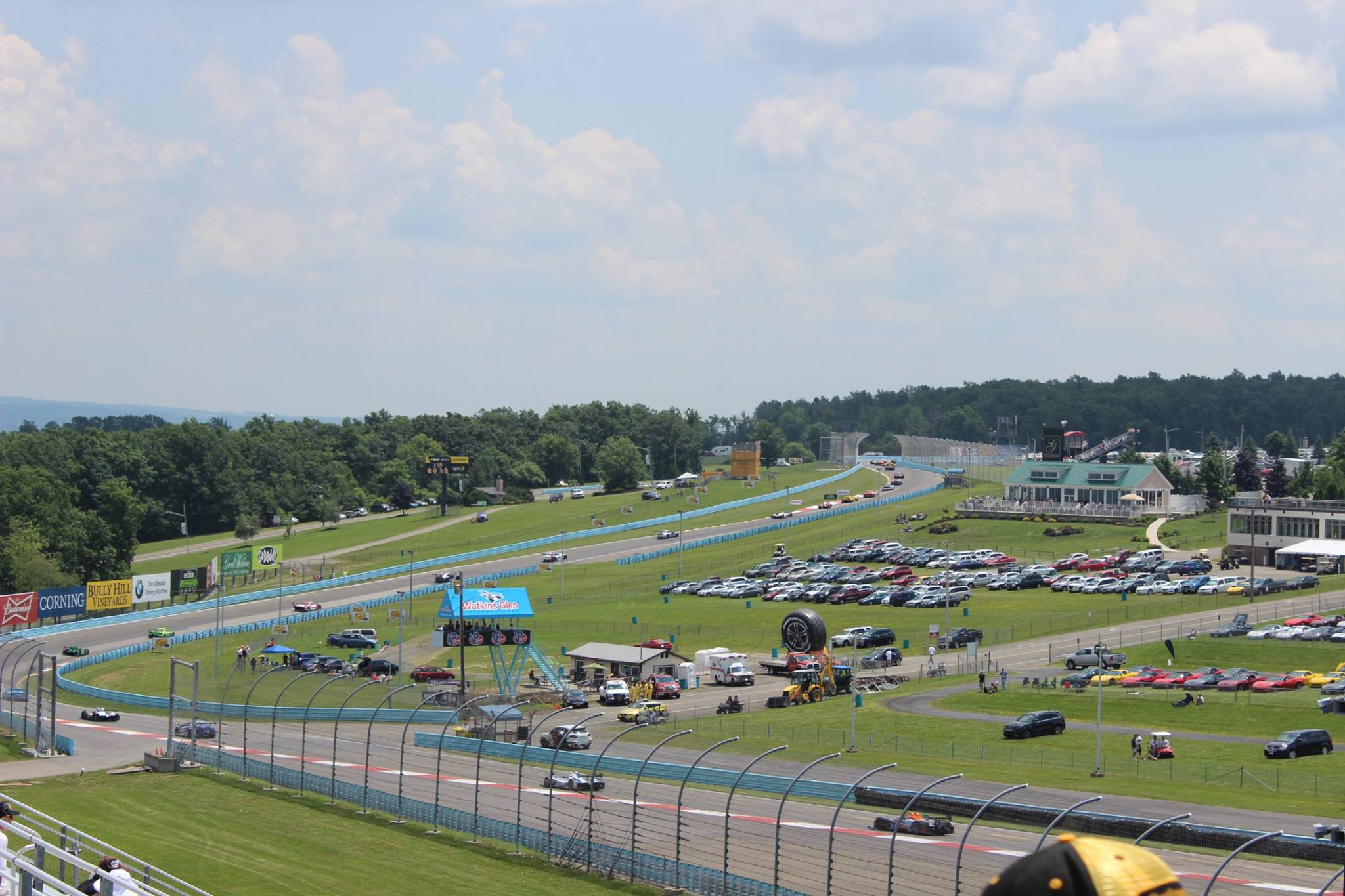
Watkins Glen International

Watkins Glen International (nicknamed "The Glen") is an automobile race track located in Watkins Glen, New York at the southern tip of Seneca Lake. It was long known around the world as the home of the Formula One United States Grand Prix, which it hosted for twenty consecutive years (1961–1980), but the site has been home to road racing of nearly every class, including the World Sportscar Championship, Trans-Am, Can-Am, NASCAR Cup Series, the International Motor Sports Association and the IndyCar Series.

Initially, public roads in the village were used for the race course. In 1956 a permanent circuit for the race was built. In 1968 the race was extended to six hours, becoming the 6 Hours of Watkins Glen. The circuit's current layout has more or less been the same since 1971, although a chicane was installed at the uphill Esses in 1975 to slow cars through these corners, where there was a fatality during practice at the 1973 United States Grand Prix. The chicane was removed in 1985, but another chicane called the "Inner Loop" was installed in 1992 after J.D. McDuffie's fatal accident during the previous year's NASCAR Winston Cup event.

On August 20, 2025, NASCAR unveiled the schedule with the race in May. That same year, on December 3, the race was extended by 10 laps, going from 90 to 100 laps.

==== Entry list ====
- (R) denotes rookie driver.
- (i) denotes driver who is ineligible for series driver points.

| No. | Driver | Team | Manufacturer |
|---|---|---|---|
| 1 | Ross Chastain | Trackhouse Racing | Chevrolet |
| 2 | Austin Cindric | Team Penske | Ford |
| 3 | Austin Dillon | Richard Childress Racing | Chevrolet |
| 4 | Noah Gragson | Front Row Motorsports | Ford |
| 5 | Kyle Larson | Hendrick Motorsports | Chevrolet |
| 6 | Brad Keselowski | RFK Racing | Ford |
| 7 | Daniel Suárez | Spire Motorsports | Chevrolet |
| 8 | Kyle Busch | Richard Childress Racing | Chevrolet |
| 9 | Chase Elliott | Hendrick Motorsports | Chevrolet |
| 10 | Ty Dillon | Kaulig Racing | Chevrolet |
| 11 | Denny Hamlin | Joe Gibbs Racing | Toyota |
| 12 | Ryan Blaney | Team Penske | Ford |
| 16 | A. J. Allmendinger | Kaulig Racing | Chevrolet |
| 17 | Chris Buescher | RFK Racing | Ford |
| 19 | Chase Briscoe | Joe Gibbs Racing | Toyota |
| 20 | Christopher Bell | Joe Gibbs Racing | Toyota |
| 21 | Josh Berry | Wood Brothers Racing | Ford |
| 22 | Joey Logano | Team Penske | Ford |
| 23 | Bubba Wallace | 23XI Racing | Toyota |
| 24 | William Byron | Hendrick Motorsports | Chevrolet |
| 34 | Todd Gilliland | Front Row Motorsports | Ford |
| 35 | Riley Herbst | 23XI Racing | Toyota |
| 38 | Zane Smith | Front Row Motorsports | Ford |
| 41 | Cole Custer | Haas Factory Team | Chevrolet |
| 42 | John Hunter Nemechek | Legacy Motor Club | Toyota |
| 43 | Erik Jones | Legacy Motor Club | Toyota |
| 45 | Tyler Reddick | 23XI Racing | Toyota |
| 47 | Ricky Stenhouse Jr. | Hyak Motorsports | Chevrolet |
| 48 | Alex Bowman | Hendrick Motorsports | Chevrolet |
| 51 | Cody Ware | Rick Ware Racing | Chevrolet |
| 54 | Ty Gibbs | Joe Gibbs Racing | Toyota |
| 60 | Ryan Preece | RFK Racing | Ford |
| 66 | Josh Bilicki (i) | Garage 66 | Ford |
| 71 | Michael McDowell | Spire Motorsports | Chevrolet |
| 77 | Carson Hocevar | Spire Motorsports | Chevrolet |
| 78 | Katherine Legge | Live Fast Motorsports | Chevrolet |
| 88 | Connor Zilisch (R) | Trackhouse Racing | Chevrolet |
| 97 | Shane van Gisbergen | Trackhouse Racing | Chevrolet |
Official entry list

== Practice ==
Austin Cindric was the fastest in the practice session with a time of 1:12.208 seconds and a speed of 122.147 mph (196.577 km/h).

=== Practice results ===
| Pos | No. | Driver | Team | Manufacturer | Time | Speed |
|---|---|---|---|---|---|---|
| 1 | 2 | Austin Cindric | Team Penske | Ford | 1:12.208 | 122.147 |
| 2 | 77 | Carson Hocevar | Spire Motorsports | Chevrolet | 1:12.252 | 122.073 |
| 3 | 54 | Ty Gibbs | Joe Gibbs Racing | Toyota | 1:12.276 | 122.032 |
Official practice results

== Qualifying ==
Shane van Gisbergen scored the pole for the race with a time of 1:11.165 and a speed of 123.937 mph (199.457 km/h).

=== Qualifying results ===
| Pos | No. | Driver | Team | Manufacturer | Time | Speed |
|---|---|---|---|---|---|---|
| 1 | 97 | Shane van Gisbergen | Trackhouse Racing | Chevrolet | 1:11.165 | 123.937 |
| 2 | 71 | Michael McDowell | Spire Motorsports | Chevrolet | 1:11.424 | 123.488 |
| 3 | 2 | Austin Cindric | Team Penske | Ford | 1:11.445 | 123.452 |
| 4 | 1 | Ross Chastain | Trackhouse Racing | Chevrolet | 1:11.449 | 123.445 |
| 5 | 88 | Connor Zilisch (R) | Trackhouse Racing | Chevrolet | 1:11.483 | 123.386 |
| 6 | 22 | Joey Logano | Team Penske | Ford | 1:11.522 | 123.319 |
| 7 | 12 | Ryan Blaney | Team Penske | Ford | 1:11.523 | 123.317 |
| 8 | 20 | Christopher Bell | Joe Gibbs Racing | Toyota | 1:11.582 | 123.215 |
| 9 | 19 | Chase Briscoe | Joe Gibbs Racing | Toyota | 1:11.583 | 123.214 |
| 10 | 54 | Ty Gibbs | Joe Gibbs Racing | Toyota | 1:11.615 | 123.159 |
| 11 | 77 | Carson Hocevar | Spire Motorsports | Chevrolet | 1:11.620 | 123.150 |
| 12 | 16 | A. J. Allmendinger | Kaulig Racing | Chevrolet | 1:11.654 | 123.092 |
| 13 | 24 | William Byron | Hendrick Motorsports | Chevrolet | 1:11.664 | 123.074 |
| 14 | 17 | Chris Buescher | RFK Racing | Ford | 1:11.668 | 123.067 |
| 15 | 45 | Tyler Reddick | 23XI Racing | Toyota | 1:11.699 | 123.014 |
| 16 | 7 | Daniel Suárez | Spire Motorsports | Chevrolet | 1:11.723 | 122.973 |
| 17 | 42 | John Hunter Nemechek | Legacy Motor Club | Toyota | 1:11.739 | 122.946 |
| 18 | 23 | Bubba Wallace | 23XI Racing | Toyota | 1:11.755 | 122.918 |
| 19 | 41 | Cole Custer | Haas Factory Team | Chevrolet | 1:11.847 | 122.761 |
| 20 | 11 | Denny Hamlin | Joe Gibbs Racing | Toyota | 1:11.854 | 122.749 |
| 21 | 8 | Kyle Busch | Richard Childress Racing | Chevrolet | 1:11.890 | 122.687 |
| 22 | 34 | Todd Gilliland | Front Row Motorsports | Ford | 1:11.941 | 122.600 |
| 23 | 5 | Kyle Larson | Hendrick Motorsports | Chevrolet | 1:11.961 | 122.566 |
| 24 | 43 | Erik Jones | Legacy Motor Club | Toyota | 1:11.972 | 122.548 |
| 25 | 3 | Austin Dillon | Richard Childress Racing | Chevrolet | 1:11.999 | 122.502 |
| 26 | 6 | Brad Keselowski | RFK Racing | Ford | 1:12.060 | 122.398 |
| 27 | 9 | Chase Elliott | Hendrick Motorsports | Chevrolet | 1:12.067 | 122.386 |
| 28 | 48 | Alex Bowman | Hendrick Motorsports | Chevrolet | 1:12.095 | 122.339 |
| 29 | 47 | Ricky Stenhouse Jr. | Hyak Motorsports | Chevrolet | 1:12.122 | 122.293 |
| 30 | 60 | Ryan Preece | RFK Racing | Ford | 1:12.124 | 122.289 |
| 31 | 10 | Ty Dillon | Kaulig Racing | Chevrolet | 1:12.148 | 122.249 |
| 32 | 35 | Riley Herbst | 23XI Racing | Toyota | 1:12.260 | 122.059 |
| 33 | 38 | Zane Smith | Front Row Motorsports | Ford | 1:12.264 | 122.052 |
| 34 | 21 | Josh Berry | Wood Brothers Racing | Ford | 1:12.614 | 121.464 |
| 35 | 4 | Noah Gragson | Front Row Motorsports | Ford | 1:12.637 | 121.426 |
| 36 | 51 | Cody Ware | Rick Ware Racing | Chevrolet | 1:13.199 | 120.493 |
| 37 | 66 | Josh Bilicki (i) | Garage 66 | Ford | 1:14.090 | 119.044 |
| 38 | 78 | Katherine Legge | Live Fast Motorsports | Chevrolet | 1:16.497 | 115.299 |
Official qualifying results

== Race ==
=== Race results ===
==== Stage results ====
Stage One Laps: 20

| Pos | No | Driver | Team | Manufacturer | Points |
|---|---|---|---|---|---|
| 1 | 1 | Ross Chastain | Trackhouse Racing | Chevrolet | 10 |
| 2 | 22 | Joey Logano | Team Penske | Ford | 9 |
| 3 | 12 | Ryan Blaney | Team Penske | Ford | 8 |
| 4 | 2 | Austin Cindric | Team Penske | Ford | 7 |
| 5 | 16 | A. J. Allmendinger | Kaulig Racing | Chevrolet | 6 |
| 6 | 42 | John Hunter Nemechek | Legacy Motor Club | Toyota | 5 |
| 7 | 20 | Christopher Bell | Joe Gibbs Racing | Toyota | 4 |
| 8 | 97 | Shane van Gisbergen | Trackhouse Racing | Chevrolet | 3 |
| 9 | 35 | Riley Herbst | 23XI Racing | Toyota | 2 |
| 10 | 71 | Michael McDowell | Spire Motorsports | Chevrolet | 1 |

Stage Two Laps: 30

| Pos | No | Driver | Team | Manufacturer | Points |
|---|---|---|---|---|---|
| 1 | 97 | Shane van Gisbergen | Trackhouse Racing | Chevrolet | 10 |
| 2 | 45 | Tyler Reddick | 23XI Racing | Toyota | 9 |
| 3 | 54 | Ty Gibbs | Joe Gibbs Racing | Toyota | 8 |
| 4 | 3 | Austin Dillon | Richard Childress Racing | Chevrolet | 7 |
| 5 | 8 | Kyle Busch | Richard Childress Racing | Chevrolet | 6 |
| 6 | 17 | Chris Buescher | RFK Racing | Ford | 5 |
| 7 | 2 | Austin Cindric | Team Penske | Ford | 4 |
| 8 | 88 | Connor Zilisch (R) | Trackhouse Racing | Chevrolet | 3 |
| 9 | 19 | Chase Briscoe | Joe Gibbs Racing | Toyota | 2 |
| 10 | 23 | Bubba Wallace | 23XI Racing | Toyota | 1 |

=== Final Stage results ===
Stage Three Laps: 50

| Pos | Grid | No | Driver | Team | Manufacturer | Laps | Points |
|---|---|---|---|---|---|---|---|
| 1 | 1 | 97 | Shane van Gisbergen | Trackhouse Racing | Chevrolet | 100 | 68 |
| 2 | 2 | 71 | Michael McDowell | Spire Motorsports | Chevrolet | 100 | 36 |
| 3 | 10 | 54 | Ty Gibbs | Joe Gibbs Racing | Toyota | 100 | 42 |
| 4 | 9 | 19 | Chase Briscoe | Joe Gibbs Racing | Toyota | 100 | 35 |
| 5 | 15 | 45 | Tyler Reddick | 23XI Racing | Toyota | 100 | 41 |
| 6 | 25 | 3 | Austin Dillon | Richard Childress Racing | Chevrolet | 100 | 38 |
| 7 | 12 | 16 | A. J. Allmendinger | Kaulig Racing | Chevrolet | 100 | 36 |
| 8 | 21 | 8 | Kyle Busch | Richard Childress Racing | Chevrolet | 100 | 35 |
| 9 | 3 | 2 | Austin Cindric | Team Penske | Ford | 100 | 39 |
| 10 | 17 | 42 | John Hunter Nemechek | Legacy Motor Club | Toyota | 100 | 32 |
| 11 | 7 | 12 | Ryan Blaney | Team Penske | Ford | 100 | 34 |
| 12 | 14 | 17 | Chris Buescher | RFK Racing | Ford | 100 | 30 |
| 13 | 16 | 7 | Daniel Suárez | Spire Motorsports | Chevrolet | 100 | 24 |
| 14 | 30 | 60 | Ryan Preece | RFK Racing | Ford | 100 | 23 |
| 15 | 19 | 41 | Cole Custer | Haas Factory Team | Chevrolet | 100 | 22 |
| 16 | 20 | 11 | Denny Hamlin | Joe Gibbs Racing | Toyota | 100 | 21 |
| 17 | 22 | 34 | Todd Gilliland | Front Row Motorsports | Ford | 100 | 20 |
| 18 | 33 | 38 | Zane Smith | Front Row Motorsports | Ford | 100 | 19 |
| 19 | 24 | 43 | Erik Jones | Legacy Motor Club | Toyota | 100 | 18 |
| 20 | 5 | 88 | Connor Zilisch (R) | Trackhouse Racing | Chevrolet | 100 | 21 |
| 21 | 8 | 20 | Christopher Bell | Joe Gibbs Racing | Toyota | 100 | 20 |
| 22 | 35 | 4 | Noah Gragson | Front Row Motorsports | Ford | 100 | 15 |
| 23 | 23 | 5 | Kyle Larson | Hendrick Motorsports | Chevrolet | 100 | 14 |
| 24 | 27 | 9 | Chase Elliott | Hendrick Motorsports | Chevrolet | 100 | 13 |
| 25 | 28 | 48 | Alex Bowman | Hendrick Motorsports | Chevrolet | 100 | 12 |
| 26 | 32 | 35 | Riley Herbst | 23XI Racing | Toyota | 100 | 13 |
| 27 | 4 | 1 | Ross Chastain | Trackhouse Racing | Chevrolet | 100 | 20 |
| 28 | 11 | 77 | Carson Hocevar | Spire Motorsports | Chevrolet | 100 | 9 |
| 29 | 18 | 23 | Bubba Wallace | 23XI Racing | Toyota | 100 | 9 |
| 30 | 26 | 6 | Brad Keselowski | RFK Racing | Ford | 100 | 7 |
| 31 | 29 | 47 | Ricky Stenhouse Jr. | Hyak Motorsports | Chevrolet | 100 | 6 |
| 32 | 34 | 21 | Josh Berry | Wood Brothers Racing | Ford | 100 | 5 |
| 33 | 31 | 10 | Ty Dillon | Kaulig Racing | Chevrolet | 99 | 4 |
| 34 | 37 | 66 | Josh Bilicki (i) | Garage 66 | Ford | 99 | 0 |
| 35 | 38 | 78 | Katherine Legge | Live Fast Motorsports | Chevrolet | 99 | 2 |
| 36 | 13 | 24 | William Byron | Hendrick Motorsports | Chevrolet | 97 | 1 |
| 37 | 36 | 51 | Cody Ware | Rick Ware Racing | Chevrolet | 90 | 1 |
| 38 | 6 | 22 | Joey Logano | Team Penske | Ford | 85 | 10 |
Official race results

=== Race statistics ===
- Lead changes: 6 among 4 different drivers
- Cautions/Laps: 4 for 12 laps
- Red flags: 0
- Time of race: 2 hours, 29 minutes, and 11 seconds
- Average speed: 98.536 miles per hour (158.578 km/h)

== Media ==
=== Television ===
The race was carried by FS1 in the United States. Mike Joy, Clint Bowyer, and Kevin Harvick called the race from the broadcast booth. Jamie Little, Regan Smith and Josh Sims handled the pit road for the television side. Larry McReynolds provided insight on-site during the race.

FS1
| Booth announcers | Pit reporters | In-race analyst |
|---|---|---|
| Lap-by-lap: Mike Joy; Color-commentator: Clint Bowyer; Color-commentator: Kevin Harvick | Jamie Little; Regan Smith; Josh Sims | Larry McReynolds |

=== Radio ===
Motor Racing Network had the radio call for the race, which was also be simulcast on Sirius XM NASCAR Radio. Alex Hayden, Mike Bagley and former crew chief Todd Gordon covered the action when the field raced down the front straightaway. Dave Moody called the race when the field raced thru the esses. Kyle Rickey covered the action when the field raced thru the inner loop and turn 5 and Tim Catafalmo covered the action in turn 6 & 7. Steve Post, Brienne Pedigo and Jason Toy called the action from the pits & garage area for MRN.

MRN
| Booth announcers | Turn announcers | Pit reporters |
|---|---|---|
| Lead announcer: Alex Hayden; Announcer: Mike Bagley; Announcer: Todd Gordon | Esses: Dave Moody; Inner loop & Turn 5: Kyle Rickey; Turn 6 & 7: Tim Catafalmo | Steve Post; Brienne Pedigo; Jason Toy |

== Standings after the race ==
Drivers' Championship standings

| | Pos | Driver | Points |
|---|---|---|---|
| | 1 | Tyler Reddick | 567 |
| | 2 | Denny Hamlin | 438 (–129) |
| | 3 | Chase Elliott | 422 (–145) |
| | 4 | Ryan Blaney | 405 (–162) |
| | 5 | Chris Buescher | 375 (–192) |
| 1 | 6 | Ty Gibbs | 372 (–195) |
| 1 | 7 | Carson Hocevar | 342 (–225) |
| | 8 | Kyle Larson | 332 (–235) |
| | 9 | Brad Keselowski | 318 (–249) |
| 1 | 10 | Bubba Wallace | 313 (–254) |
| 1 | 11 | Christopher Bell | 311 (–256) |
| 2 | 12 | William Byron | 309 (–258) |
| | 13 | Ryan Preece | 296 (–271) |
| | 14 | Daniel Suárez | 295 (–272) |
| 1 | 15 | Austin Cindric | 287 (–280) |
| 3 | 16 | Shane van Gisbergen | 283 (–284) |
Official driver's standings

Manufacturers' Championship standings

| Pos | Manufacturer | Points |
|---|---|---|
| 1 | Toyota | 547 |
| 2 | Chevrolet | 495 (–52) |
| 3 | Ford | 409 (–138) |

- Note: Only the first 16 positions are included for the driver standings.

| Previous race: 2026 Würth 400 | NASCAR Cup Series; 2026 season | Next race: 2026 Coca-Cola 600 (points); 2026 NASCAR All-Star Race (exhibition) |
