= List of NASCAR All-Star Race broadcasters =

The following is a list of the American television and radio and announcers that have broadcast the NASCAR All-Star Race over the years.

== Television ==
=== 2020s ===
Year	Track	Network	Lap-by-lap	Color commentator(s)	Pit reporter(s)
2026	Dover	FS1	Mike Joy	Clint Bowyer and Kevin Harvick	Jamie Little and Regan Smith
2025	North Wilkesboro	FS1	Mike Joy	Clint Bowyer and Kevin Harvick	Jamie Little and Regan Smith
2024	North Wilkesboro	FS1	Mike Joy	Clint Bowyer and Kevin Harvick	Jamie Little and Regan Smith
2023	North Wilkesboro	FS1	Mike Joy	Clint Bowyer, Darrell Waltrip and Larry McReynolds	Jamie Little, Regan Smith, and Josh Sims
2022	Texas	FS1	Mike Joy	Clint Bowyer and Larry McReynolds	Jamie Little and Vince Welch
2021	Texas	FS1	Mike Joy	Jeff Gordon and Clint Bowyer	Jamie Little, Regan Smith, and Vince Welch
2020	Bristol	FS1	Mike Joy	Jeff Gordon	Regan Smith and Matt Yocum

=== 2010s ===
Year	Track	Network	Lap-by-lap	Color commentator(s)	Pit reporter(s)
2019	Charlotte	FS1	Mike Joy	Darrell Waltrip and Jeff Gordon	Matt Yocum, Jamie Little, and Vince Welch
2018	Charlotte	FS1	Mike Joy	Darrell Waltrip and Jeff Gordon	Matt Yocum, Jamie Little, and Vince Welch
2017	Charlotte	FS1	Mike Joy	Darrell Waltrip and Jeff Gordon	Matt Yocum, Jamie Little, and Vince Welch
2016	Charlotte	FS1	Mike Joy	Darrell Waltrip and Jeff Gordon	Matt Yocum, Jamie Little, and Vince Welch
2015	Charlotte	FS1	Mike Joy	Darrell Waltrip and Larry McReynolds	Matt Yocum, Jamie Little, and Vince Welch
2014	Charlotte	FS1	Mike Joy	Darrell Waltrip and Larry McReynolds	Matt Yocum, Steve Byrnes, Krista Voda, and Jeff Hammond
2013	Charlotte	Speed	Mike Joy	Darrell Waltrip and Larry McReynolds	Matt Yocum, Steve Byrnes, Krista Voda, and Jeff Hammond
2012	Charlotte	Speed	Mike Joy	Darrell Waltrip and Michael Waltrip	Matt Yocum, Dick Berggren, and Steve Byrnes
2011	Charlotte	Speed	Mike Joy	Darrell Waltrip and Michael Waltrip	Matt Yocum, Dick Berggren, and Steve Byrnes
2010	Charlotte	Speed	Mike Joy	Darrell Waltrip and Larry McReynolds	Matt Yocum, Dick Berggren, and Steve Byrnes

=== 2000s ===
Year	Track	Network	Lap-by-lap	Color commentator(s)	Pit reporter(s)
2009	Charlotte	Speed	Mike Joy	Darrell Waltrip and Larry McReynolds	Matt Yocum, Dick Berggren, Steve Byrnes, and Carl Edwards
2008	Charlotte	Speed	Mike Joy	Darrell Waltrip and Larry McReynolds	Matt Yocum, Dick Berggren, Steve Byrnes, and Carl Edwards
2007	Charlotte	Speed	Mike Joy	Darrell Waltrip and Larry McReynolds	Dick Berggren and Steve Byrnes
2006	Charlotte	FX	Mike Joy	Darrell Waltrip and Larry McReynolds	Matt Yocum, Dick Berggren, and Steve Byrnes
2005	Charlotte	FX	Mike Joy	Darrell Waltrip and Larry McReynolds	Matt Yocum and Dick Berggren
2004	Charlotte	FX	Mike Joy	Darrell Waltrip and Larry McReynolds	Matt Yocum, Dick Berggren, and Steve Byrnes
2003	Charlotte	FX	Mike Joy	Darrell Waltrip and Larry McReynolds	Matt Yocum, Dick Berggren, and Steve Byrnes
2002	Charlotte	FX	Mike Joy	Darrell Waltrip and Larry McReynolds	Matt Yocum, Dick Berggren, and Steve Byrnes
2001	Charlotte	FX	Mike Joy	Darrell Waltrip and Larry McReynolds	Matt Yocum and Dick Berggren
2000	Charlotte	TNN	Eli Gold	Buddy Baker and Dick Berggren	Glenn Jarrett and Ralph Sheheen

==== Notes ====
- In 2001, television coverage moved to FX as part of the new NASCAR television contract, and qualifying was changed so the pit stop took place at the start of the qualifying, and the stop was a four-tire change instead of two. Also starting in 2001, crew members were introduced together with drivers during the driver introduction ceremonies, with Fox broadcasters Chris Myers and Jeff Hammond interviewing selected persons during the ceremony.

=== 1990s ===
Year	Track	Network	Lap-by-lap	Color commentator(s)	Pit reporter(s)
1999	Charlotte	TNN	Eli Gold	Buddy Baker and Dick Berggren	Glenn Jarrett and Ralph Sheheen
1998	Charlotte	TNN	Eli Gold	Buddy Baker and Dick Berggren	Glenn Jarrett and Matt Yocum
1997	Charlotte	TNN	Eli Gold	Buddy Baker and Dick Berggren	Glenn Jarrett and Matt Yocum
1996	Charlotte	TNN	Eli Gold	Buddy Baker and Dick Berggren	Glenn Jarrett and Randy Pemberton
1995	Charlotte	TNN	Mike Joy	Buddy Baker and Dick Berggren	Glenn Jarrett, Randy Pemberton, and Rick Benjamin
1994	Charlotte	TNN	Mike Joy	Buddy Baker	Glenn Jarrett and Randy Pemberton
1993	Charlotte	TNN	Mike Joy	Neil Bonnett and Buddy Baker	Randy Pemberton and Pat Patterson
1992	Charlotte	TNN	Mike Joy	Neil Bonnett and Buddy Baker	Glenn Jarrett, Randy Pemberton, and Katie Haas
1991	Charlotte	CBS	Ken Squier	Ned Jarrett	Neil Bonnett and Chris Economaki
1990	Charlotte	ABC	Paul Page	Benny Parsons and Bobby Unser	Jack Arute

==== Notes ====
- Speedvision carried a special live in-car simulcast of the 1997 race.
- ABC carried the race in 1990, with the Winston Open finish, and CBS carried both the Open and The Winston in 1991. The race was moved up one day to Saturday night, and it moved to live coverage on The Nashville Network (now Paramount Network) in 1992.

=== 1980s ===
Year	Track	Network	Lap-by-lap	Color commentator(s)	Pit reporter(s)
1989	Charlotte	ABC	Paul Page	Benny Parsons and Bobby Unser	Jack Arute
1988	Charlotte	ABC	Keith Jackson	Jerry Punch	Jerry Gappens
1987	Charlotte	ABC	Keith Jackson	Donnie Allison	Jerry Punch
1986	Atlanta	ESPN	Bob Jenkins	Larry Nuber and Benny Parsons	Jack Arute
1985	Charlotte	Jefferson-Pilot	Mike Joy	Kyle Petty Neil Bonnet	Johnny Hayes Larry Nuber

==== Notes ====
- The 1986 event featured the Atlanta Invitational, a 100-lap race for drivers who did not meet the eligibility of The Winston. The Atlanta Invitational was held before The Winston, but due to a tape delay, ESPN aired the race after The Winston.
- Keith Jackson, much better known for his work on college football and ABC's Wide World of Sports, called the 1987 event, known for the "Pass in the Grass". He was the network's NASCAR play-by-play announcer until the 1987 season.
  - From 1987 to 1990, ABC Sports covered reports on time trials on the Indianapolis 500, which ABC Sports also covered.
- From its first year, the unique moniker "The Winston" was adopted by sponsor R. J. Reynolds. Rather than referring to the event as a traditional "All star" race, no generic reference was included in the title. Due to limitations on television tobacco advertising, other races which involved tobacco title sponsorship utilized generic names on network television. For example, on ABC, the Winston 500 was called the "Talladega 500" and the Marlboro 500 was called the "Michigan 500." Without a generic alternative, television and other media were forced to acknowledge Winston as the title sponsor, effectively skirting, and pushing the limits of tobacco advertising regulation.

== Radio ==
Motor Racing Network is one of the two main radio broadcasters of the NASCAR Cup Series and Xfinity Series, covering events held at tracks owned by ISC, along with Dover International Speedway and Pocono Raceway. It also broadcasts the NASCAR All-Star Race, and the entire Truck Series season (although clearance of Xfinity and Truck Series events may vary by station). Almost all of the remaining races are broadcast by the Speedway Motorsports-owned Performance Racing Network (PRN), besides the Brickyard 400 (which is broadcast by the Indianapolis Motor Speedway Radio Network in association with PRN); many stations have affiliations with both MRN and PRN in order to air a full NASCAR schedule. All races are also carried on Sirius XM NASCAR Radio.

The lead announcers for the 2017 race's broadcast on MRN were Joe Moore, Jeff Striegle and Rusty Wallace. The network also implemented two announcers on each side of the track: Dave Moody in turns 1 and 2 and Kyle Rickey in turns 3 and 4. Alex Hayden, Winston Kelly, Kim Coon, and Steve Post were the network's pit lane reporters. The lead announcers for MRN in the following year were Mike Bagley, Jeff Striegle and Rusty Wallace. The network continued to implement two announcers on each side of the track: Dave Moody in turns 1 and 2 and Kyle Rickey in turns 3 and 4. Alex Hayden, Winston Kelly, Kim Coon, and Steve Post were the network's pit lane reporters. Alex Hayden became one of the lead announcers come 2019.
