= 2026 NASCAR All-Star Race =

42nd iteration of the NASCAR All-Star Race

Race details
- Race 2 of 2 exhibition races in the 2026 NASCAR Cup Series
- Date: May 17, 2026
- Location: Dover Motor Speedway in Dover, Delaware
- Distance: 350 laps, 350 mi (563.27 km)
- Average speed: 127.864 miles per hour (205.777 km/h)

Pole position
Driver	Denny Hamlin	Joe Gibbs Racing
- Time: 1:49.298

Most laps led
Driver	Denny Hamlin	Joe Gibbs Racing
- Laps: 103

Winner
No. 11	Denny Hamlin	Joe Gibbs Racing

Television in the United States
- Network: FS1
- Announcers: Mike Joy, Clint Bowyer, and Kevin Harvick

Radio in the United States
- Radio: MRN
- Booth announcers: Alex Hayden and Mike Bagley
- Turn announcers: Brad Gillie (Backstretch)

The 2026 NASCAR All-Star Race (XLII) was a non-championship NASCAR Cup Series stock car exhibition race held on May 17, 2026, at Dover Motor Speedway in Dover, Delaware. Contested over 350 laps, it was the second exhibition race of the 2026 NASCAR Cup Series season. Denny Hamlin won the race. This was the final NASCAR event for Kyle Busch, as he died of severe pneumonia that progressed into sepsis four days later on May 21.

== Report ==
=== Background ===
Dover Motor Speedway, the track where the race was held.

Dover Motor Speedway is an oval race track in Dover, Delaware, United States that has held at least two NASCAR races since it opened in 1969. In addition to NASCAR, the track also hosted USAC and the NTT IndyCar Series. The track features one layout, a 1 mile (1.6 km) concrete oval, with 24° banking in the turns and 9° banking on the straights. The speedway is owned and operated by Speedway Motorsports.

The track, nicknamed "The Monster Mile", was built in 1969 by Melvin Joseph of Melvin L. Joseph Construction Company, Inc., with an asphalt surface, but was replaced with concrete in 1995. Six years later in 2001, the track's capacity moved to 135,000 seats, making the track have the largest capacity of sports venue in the mid-Atlantic. In 2002, the name changed to Dover International Speedway from Dover Downs International Speedway after Dover Downs Gaming and Entertainment split, making Dover Motorsports. From 2007 to 2009, the speedway worked on an improvement project called "The Monster Makeover", which expanded facilities at the track and beautified the track. After the 2014 season, the track's capacity was reduced to 95,500 seats. The track began to host the NASCAR All-Star Race in 2026.

On February 25, 2026, NASCAR and Dover announced the new format for the race, with the full 36-car field being eligible, becoming 350 laps in length, with the field being inverted after stage one, and the shortening of the field from 36 to 26 after stage 2.

==== Entry list ====
- (R) denotes rookie driver.
- (i) denotes driver who is ineligible for series driver points.

No.	Driver	Team	Manufacturer
1	Ross Chastain	Trackhouse Racing	Chevrolet
2	Austin Cindric	Team Penske	Ford
3	Austin Dillon	Richard Childress Racing	Chevrolet
4	Noah Gragson	Front Row Motorsports	Ford
5	Kyle Larson	Hendrick Motorsports	Chevrolet
6	Brad Keselowski	RFK Racing	Ford
7	Daniel Suárez	Spire Motorsports	Chevrolet
8	Kyle Busch	Richard Childress Racing	Chevrolet
9	Chase Elliott	Hendrick Motorsports	Chevrolet
10	Ty Dillon	Kaulig Racing	Chevrolet
11	Denny Hamlin	Joe Gibbs Racing	Toyota
12	Ryan Blaney	Team Penske	Ford
16	A. J. Allmendinger	Kaulig Racing	Chevrolet
17	Chris Buescher	RFK Racing	Ford
19	Chase Briscoe	Joe Gibbs Racing	Toyota
20	Christopher Bell	Joe Gibbs Racing	Toyota
21	Josh Berry	Wood Brothers Racing	Ford
22	Joey Logano	Team Penske	Ford
23	Bubba Wallace	23XI Racing	Toyota
24	William Byron	Hendrick Motorsports	Chevrolet
34	Todd Gilliland	Front Row Motorsports	Ford
35	Riley Herbst	23XI Racing	Toyota
38	Zane Smith	Front Row Motorsports	Ford
41	Cole Custer	Haas Factory Team	Chevrolet
42	John Hunter Nemechek	Legacy Motor Club	Toyota
43	Erik Jones	Legacy Motor Club	Toyota
45	Tyler Reddick	23XI Racing	Toyota
47	Ricky Stenhouse Jr.	Hyak Motorsports	Chevrolet
48	Alex Bowman	Hendrick Motorsports	Chevrolet
51	Cody Ware	Rick Ware Racing	Chevrolet
54	Ty Gibbs	Joe Gibbs Racing	Toyota
60	Ryan Preece	RFK Racing	Ford
71	Michael McDowell	Spire Motorsports	Chevrolet
77	Carson Hocevar	Spire Motorsports	Chevrolet
88	Connor Zilisch (R)	Trackhouse Racing	Chevrolet
97	Shane van Gisbergen	Trackhouse Racing	Chevrolet
Official entry list

== Practice ==
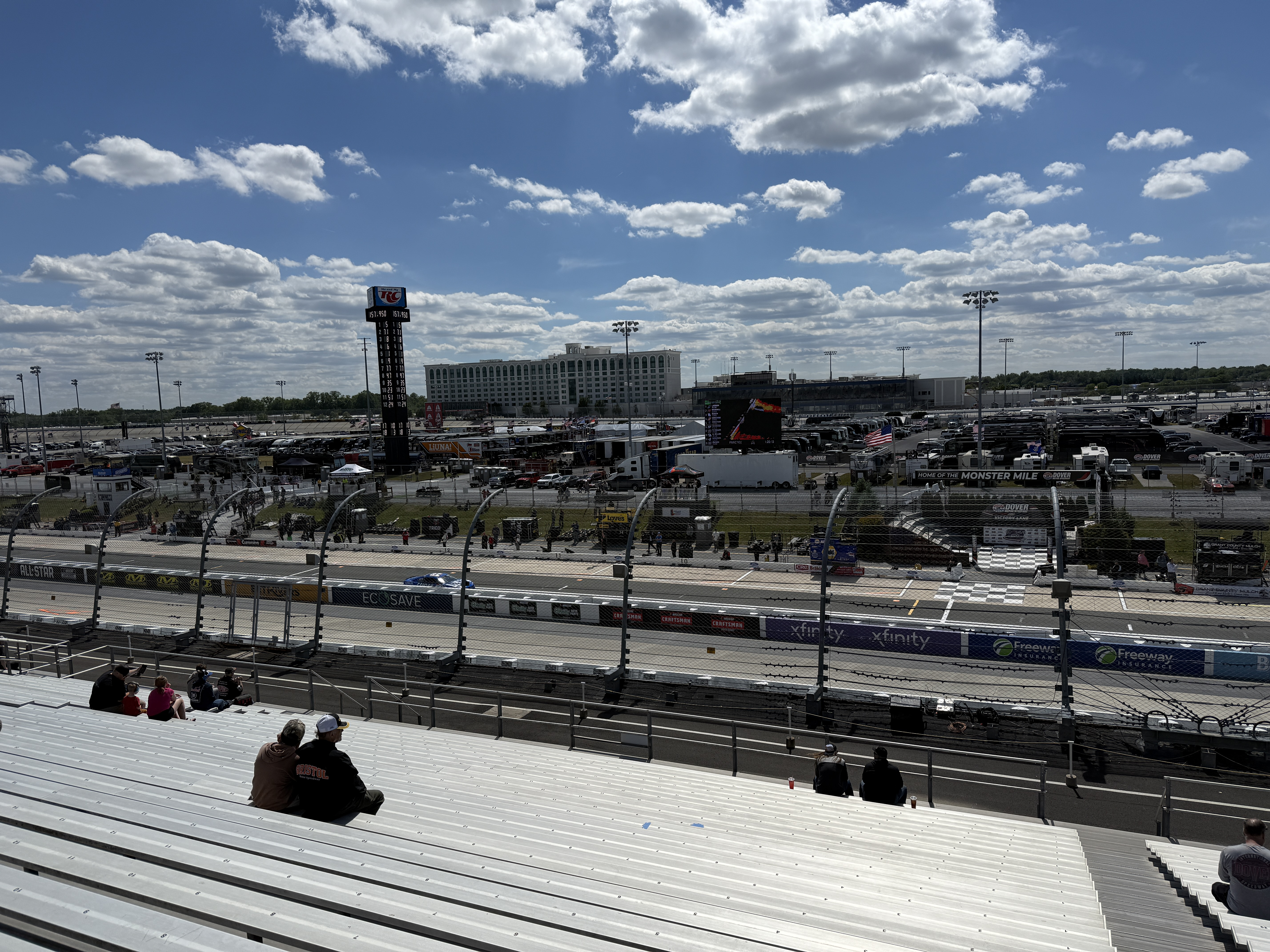
Practice for the NASCAR All-Star Race

=== Practice results ===
Kyle Larson was the fastest in the practice session with a time of 22.792 seconds and a speed of 157.950 mph (254.196 km/h). A freak accident during the session resulted in the injury of Donovan Williams, a tire carrier for Daniel Suarez, who took the hit for FOX pit reporter Amanda Busick.

Pos	No.	Driver	Team	Manufacturer	Time	Speed
1	5	Kyle Larson	Hendrick Motorsports	Chevrolet	22.792	157.950
2	71	Michael McDowell	Spire Motorsports	Chevrolet	22.810	157.826
3	11	Denny Hamlin	Joe Gibbs Racing	Toyota	22.839	157.625
Official practice results

== Qualifying (Pit Crew Challenge) ==
The 2026 Pit Crew Challenge set the pit selection for the race. Denny Hamlin won the pole for the race. Zane Smith's pit crew won the Pit Crew Challenge.

=== NASCAR All-Star Race Starting Lineup ===
Pos	No.	Driver	Team	Manufacturer	Notes
1	11	Denny Hamlin	Joe Gibbs Racing	Toyota	2015 All-Star Race Winner
2	6	Brad Keselowski	RFK Racing	Ford	2012 Cup Series Champion
3	43	Erik Jones	Legacy Motor Club	Toyota	Open Car
4	1	Ross Chastain	Trackhouse Racing	Chevrolet	2025 Coca-Cola 600 Winner
5	24	William Byron	Hendrick Motorsports	Chevrolet	2025 Daytona 500 Winner
6	20	Christopher Bell	Joe Gibbs Racing	Toyota	2025 All-Star Race Winner
7	23	Bubba Wallace	23XI Racing	Toyota	2025 Brickyard 400 Winner
8	22	Joey Logano	Team Penske	Ford	2016 & 2024 All-Star Race Winner
9	54	Ty Gibbs	Joe Gibbs Racing	Toyota	2026 Food City 500 Winner
10	2	Austin Cindric	Team Penske	Ford	2025 Jack Link's 500 Winner
11	8	Kyle Busch	Richard Childress Racing	Chevrolet	2017 All-Star Race Winner
12	48	Alex Bowman	Hendrick Motorsports	Chevrolet	Open Car
13	4	Noah Gragson	Front Row Motorsports	Ford	Open Car
14	45	Tyler Reddick	23XI Racing	Toyota	2026 Daytona 500 Winner
15	10	Ty Dillon	Kaulig Racing	Chevrolet	Open Car
16	19	Chase Briscoe	Joe Gibbs Racing	Toyota	2025 The Great American Getaway 400 Winner
17	3	Austin Dillon	Richard Childress Racing	Chevrolet	2025 Cook Out 400 Winner
18	97	Shane van Gisbergen	Trackhouse Racing	Chevrolet	2025 Viva México 250 Winner
19	21	Josh Berry	Wood Brothers Racing	Ford	2025 Pennzoil 400 Winner
20	34	Todd Gilliland	Front Row Motorsports	Ford	Open Car
21	35	Riley Herbst	23XI Racing	Toyota	Open Car
22	41	Cole Custer	Haas Factory Team	Chevrolet	Open Car
23	51	Cody Ware	Rick Ware Racing	Chevrolet	Open Car
24	77	Carson Hocevar	Spire Motorsports	Chevrolet	2026 Jack Link's 500 Winner
25	38	Zane Smith	Front Row Motorsports	Ford	Open Car
26	60	Ryan Preece	RFK Racing	Ford	Open Car
27	88	Connor Zilisch (R)	Trackhouse Racing	Chevrolet	Open Car
28	12	Ryan Blaney	Team Penske	Ford	2022 All-Star Race Winner
29	5	Kyle Larson	Hendrick Motorsports	Chevrolet	2019, 2021, & 2023 All-Star Race Winner
30	71	Michael McDowell	Spire Motorsports	Chevrolet	Open Car
31	9	Chase Elliott	Hendrick Motorsports	Chevrolet	2020 All-Star Race Winner
32	17	Chris Buescher	RFK Racing	Ford	Open Car
33	7	Daniel Suárez	Spire Motorsports	Chevrolet	Open Car
34	16	A. J. Allmendinger	Kaulig Racing	Chevrolet	Open Car
35	47	Ricky Stenhouse Jr.	Hyak Motorsports	Chevrolet	Open Car
36	42	John Hunter Nemechek	Legacy Motor Club	Toyota	Open Car
Official starting lineup

== Race ==
=== Segment results ===
Segment One Laps: 75

Pos	No	Driver	Team	Manufacturer
1	23	Bubba Wallace	23XI Racing	Toyota
2	11	Denny Hamlin	Joe Gibbs Racing	Toyota
3	1	Ross Chastain	Trackhouse Racing	Chevrolet
4	19	Chase Briscoe	Joe Gibbs Racing	Toyota
5	6	Brad Keselowski	RFK Racing	Ford
6	2	Austin Cindric	Team Penske	Ford
7	24	William Byron	Hendrick Motorsports	Chevrolet
8	22	Joey Logano	Team Penske	Ford
9	3	Austin Dillon	Richard Childress Racing	Chevrolet
10	45	Tyler Reddick	23XI Racing	Toyota
Official segment one results

Segment Two Laps: 75

Pos	No	Driver	Team	Manufacturer
1	45	Tyler Reddick	23XI Racing	Toyota
2	19	Chase Briscoe	Joe Gibbs Racing	Toyota
3	11	Denny Hamlin	Joe Gibbs Racing	Toyota
4	77	Carson Hocevar	Spire Motorsports	Chevrolet
5	88	Connor Zilisch (R)	Trackhouse Racing	Chevrolet
6	43	Erik Jones	Legacy Motor Club	Toyota
7	24	William Byron	Hendrick Motorsports	Chevrolet
8	48	Alex Bowman	Hendrick Motorsports	Chevrolet
9	71	Michael McDowell	Spire Motorsports	Chevrolet
10	4	Noah Gragson	Front Row Motorsports	Ford
Official segment two results

=== Final Segment Results ===
Laps: 200

Pos	Grid	No	Driver	Team	Manufacturer	Laps
1	1	11	Denny Hamlin	Joe Gibbs Racing	Toyota	200
2	2	19	Chase Briscoe	Joe Gibbs Racing	Toyota	200
3	7	43	Erik Jones	Legacy Motor Club	Toyota	200
4	11	3	Austin Dillon	Richard Childress Racing	Chevrolet	200
5	5	88	Connor Zilisch (R)	Trackhouse Racing	Chevrolet	200
6	6	2	Austin Cindric	Team Penske	Ford	200
7	4	24	William Byron	Hendrick Motorsports	Chevrolet	200
8	9	71	Michael McDowell	Spire Motorsports	Chevrolet	200
9	10	48	Alex Bowman	Hendrick Motorsports	Chevrolet	200
10	15	6	Brad Keselowski	RFK Racing	Ford	200
11	14	4	Noah Gragson	Front Row Motorsports	Ford	200
12	20	16	A. J. Allmendinger	Kaulig Racing	Chevrolet	200
13	24	12	Ryan Blaney	Team Penske	Ford	200
14	17	77	Carson Hocevar	Spire Motorsports	Chevrolet	199
15	13	10	Ty Dillon	Kaulig Racing	Chevrolet	198
16	16	47	Ricky Stenhouse Jr.	Hyak Motorsports	Chevrolet	198
17	23	8	Kyle Busch	Richard Childress Racing	Chevrolet	198
18	19	21	Josh Berry	Wood Brothers Racing	Ford	197
19	21	97	Shane van Gisbergen	Trackhouse Racing	Chevrolet	197
20	12	23	Bubba Wallace	23XI Racing	Toyota	196
21	26	7	Daniel Suárez	Spire Motorsports	Chevrolet	196
22	3	45	Tyler Reddick	23XI Racing	Toyota	168
23	22	20	Christopher Bell	Joe Gibbs Racing	Toyota	164
24	18	54	Ty Gibbs	Joe Gibbs Racing	Toyota	138
25	8	22	Joey Logano	Team Penske	Ford	137
26	25	5	Kyle Larson	Hendrick Motorsports	Chevrolet	134
Did not make Final Stage
27	23	51	Cody Ware	Rick Ware Racing	Chevrolet	150
28	25	38	Zane Smith	Front Row Motorsports	Ford	144
29	21	35	Riley Herbst	23XI Racing	Toyota	139
30	4	1	Ross Chastain	Trackhouse Racing	Chevrolet	80
31	36	42	John Hunter Nemechek	Legacy Motor Club	Toyota	72
32	31	9	Chase Elliott	Hendrick Motorsports	Chevrolet	72
33	32	17	Chris Buescher	RFK Racing	Ford	72
34	20	34	Todd Gilliland	Front Row Motorsports	Ford	2
35	26	60	Ryan Preece	RFK Racing	Ford	1
36	22	41	Cole Custer	Haas Factory Team	Chevrolet	1
Official NASCAR All-Star Race results

== Media ==
=== Television ===
Fox Sports was the television broadcaster of the race in the United States. Lap-by-lap announcer, Mike Joy, Clint Bowyer, and two-time All-Star race winner Kevin Harvick called the race from the broadcast booth. Jamie Little and Regan Smith handled pit road for the television side. Larry McReynolds provided insight on-site during the race.

FS1
Booth announcers	Pit reporters	In-race analyst
Lap-by-lap: Mike Joy; Color-commentator: Clint Bowyer; Color-commentator: Kevin Harvick	Jamie Little; Regan Smith	Larry McReynolds

=== Radio ===
Motor Racing Network (MRN) continued their longstanding relationship with Speedway Motorsports to broadcast the race on radio. The lead announcers for the race's broadcast were Alex Hayden and Todd Gordon. The network also had one announcer stationed in turn 4: Brad Gille. Steve Post and Chris Wilner were the network's pit lane reporters. The network's broadcast was also simulcasted on Sirius XM NASCAR Radio.

MRN Radio
Booth announcers	Turn announcer	Pit reporters
Lead announcer: Alex Hayden; Announcer: Mike Bagley	Backstretch: Brad Gillie	Steve Post; Chris Wilner

Previous race: 2026 Go Bowling at The Glen	NASCAR Cup Series; 2026 season	Next race: 2026 Coca-Cola 600
