= 2025 NASCAR All-Star Race =

41st iteration of the NASCAR All-Star Race

Race details
- Date: May 18, 2025
- Location: North Wilkesboro Speedway in North Wilkesboro, North Carolina, U.S.
- Course: Permanent racing facility 0.625 mi (1.006 km)
- Distance: Open: 100 laps, 62.5 mi (100.6 km); All-Star Race: 250 Laps, 156 mi (251 km)
- Avg Speed: Open: 98.425 mph (158.400 km/h); All-Star Race: 95.728 mph (154.059 km/h)

NASCAR All Star Open
- Pole: Shane van Gisbergen (Trackhouse Racing)
- Time: 1:28.684
- Fastest Lap: Zane Smith (Front Row Motorsports)
- Time: 18.627
- Winner: Carson Hocevar (Spire Motorsports)
- Fan Vote winner: Noah Gragson (Front Row Motorsports)

NASCAR All-Star Race
- Pole: Brad Keselowski (RFK Racing)
- Time: 1:27.362
- Fastest Lap: Joey Logano (Team Penske)
- Time: 18.583
- Most laps led: Joey Logano (Team Penske)
- Laps: 139
- Winner: Christopher Bell (Joe Gibbs Racing)

Television
- Network: FS1
- Announcers: Mike Joy, Clint Bowyer, and Kevin Harvick

Radio
- Network: Motor Racing Network
- Announcers: Alex Hayden, Mike Bagley and Rusty Wallace (Booth); Dave Moody (4) (Turns)

The 2025 NASCAR All-Star Race (XLI) was a non-championship NASCAR Cup Series stock car exhibition race held on May 18, 2025, at North Wilkesboro Speedway in North Wilkesboro, North Carolina. Contested over 250 laps, it was the second exhibition race of the 2025 NASCAR Cup Series season.

In the open, Carson Hocevar won the race. John Hunter Nemechek finished 2nd, and Ty Dillon finished 3rd. Erik Jones and Michael McDowell rounded out the top five, and Zane Smith, A. J. Allmendinger, Bubba Wallace, Cole Custer, and Riley Herbst rounded out the top ten. Noah Gragson advanced to the main race after winning the fan vote.

In the main race, Christopher Bell won the $1 million. Joey Logano finished 2nd, and Ross Chastain finished 3rd. Alex Bowman and Chase Elliott rounded out the top five, and Christopher Bell, Tyler Reddick, Kyle Busch, Chase Briscoe, and Chris Buescher rounded out the top ten.

== Report ==
=== Background ===
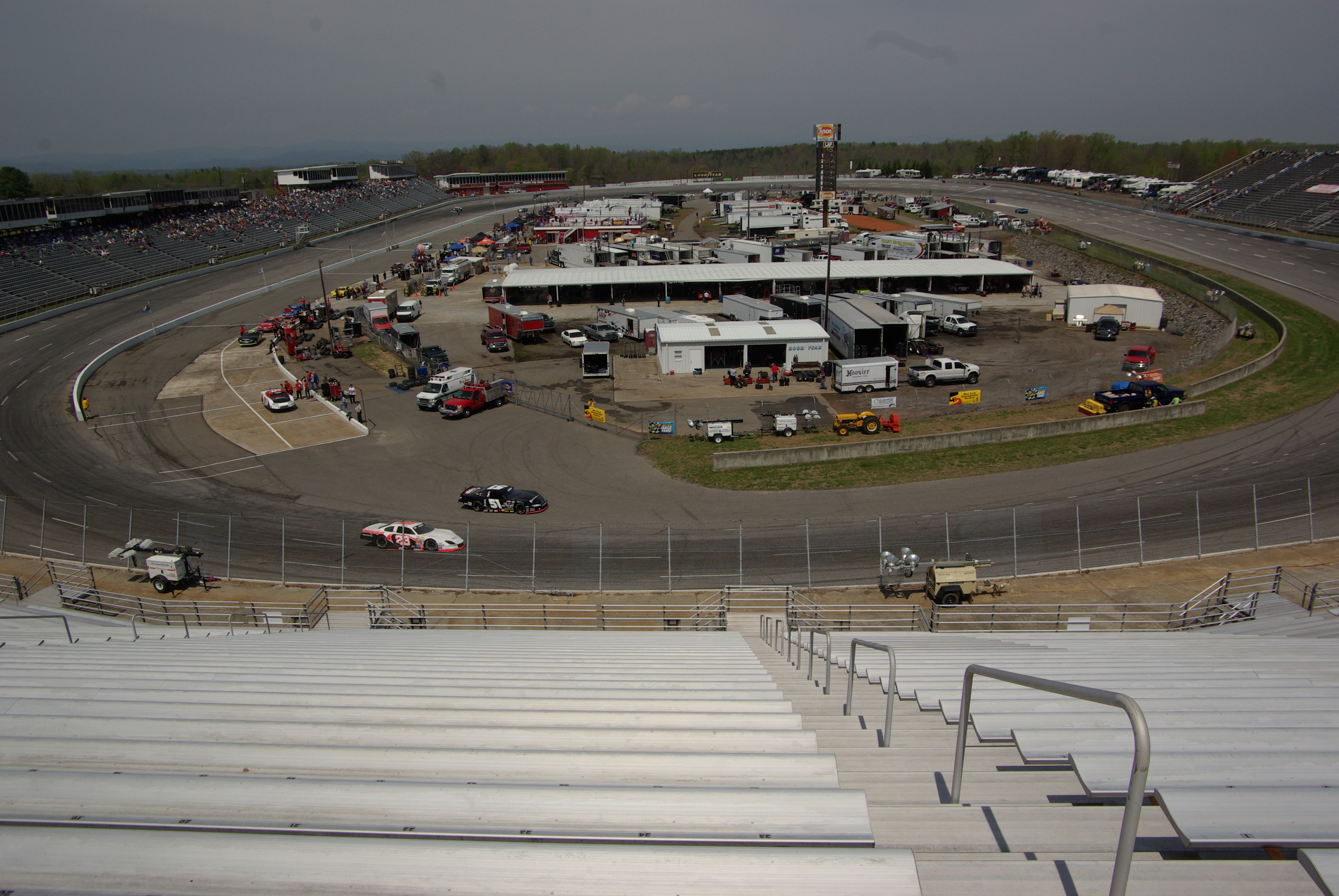
North Wilkesboro Speedway, the track where the race was held.

The All-Star Race is open to race winners from last season through the 2025 AdventHealth 400 at Kansas Speedway, all previous All-Star race winners, NASCAR Cup champions who had attempted to qualify for every race in 2024, the top two race finishers of the All-Star Open, and the winner of the All-Star fan vote are eligible to compete in the All-Star Race.

==== Entry list ====
- (R) denotes rookie driver.
- (i) denotes driver who is ineligible for series driver points.

===== NASCAR All-Star Open =====
No.	Driver	Team	Manufacturer
4	Noah Gragson	Front Row Motorsports	Ford
7	Justin Haley	Spire Motorsports	Chevrolet
10	Ty Dillon	Kaulig Racing	Chevrolet
15	Cody Ware	Rick Ware Racing	Ford
16	A. J. Allmendinger	Kaulig Racing	Chevrolet
23	Bubba Wallace	23XI Racing	Toyota
34	Todd Gilliland	Front Row Motorsports	Ford
35	Riley Herbst (R)	23XI Racing	Toyota
38	Zane Smith	Front Row Motorsports	Ford
41	Cole Custer	Haas Factory Team	Ford
42	John Hunter Nemechek	Legacy Motor Club	Toyota
43	Erik Jones	Legacy Motor Club	Toyota
54	Ty Gibbs	Joe Gibbs Racing	Toyota
60	Ryan Preece	RFK Racing	Ford
66	Chad Finchum	Garage 66	Ford
71	Michael McDowell	Spire Motorsports	Chevrolet
77	Carson Hocevar	Spire Motorsports	Chevrolet
88	Shane van Gisbergen (R)	Trackhouse Racing	Chevrolet
Official entry list

===== NASCAR All-Star Race =====
No.	Driver	Team	Manufacturer
1	Ross Chastain	Trackhouse Racing	Chevrolet
2	Austin Cindric	Team Penske	Ford
3	Austin Dillon	Richard Childress Racing	Chevrolet
5	Kyle Larson	Hendrick Motorsports	Chevrolet
6	Brad Keselowski	RFK Racing	Ford
8	Kyle Busch	Richard Childress Racing	Chevrolet
9	Chase Elliott	Hendrick Motorsports	Chevrolet
11	Denny Hamlin	Joe Gibbs Racing	Toyota
12	Ryan Blaney	Team Penske	Ford
17	Chris Buescher	RFK Racing	Ford
19	Chase Briscoe	Joe Gibbs Racing	Toyota
20	Christopher Bell	Joe Gibbs Racing	Toyota
21	Josh Berry	Wood Brothers Racing	Ford
22	Joey Logano	Team Penske	Ford
24	William Byron	Hendrick Motorsports	Chevrolet
45	Tyler Reddick	23XI Racing	Toyota
47	Ricky Stenhouse Jr.	Hyak Motorsports	Chevrolet
48	Alex Bowman	Hendrick Motorsports	Chevrolet
51	Harrison Burton (i)	Rick Ware Racing	Ford
99	Daniel Suárez	Trackhouse Racing	Chevrolet
Official entry list

== Practice ==
=== Practice results ===
Tyler Reddick was the fastest in the practice session with a time of 18.198 seconds and a speed of 123.640 mph (198.979 km/h).

Pos	No.	Driver	Team	Manufacturer	Time	Speed
1	45	Tyler Reddick	23XI Racing	Toyota	18.198	123.640
2	9	Chase Elliott	Hendrick Motorsports	Chevrolet	18.233	123.403
3	23	Bubba Wallace	23XI Racing	Toyota	18.237	123.376
Official practice results

== All-Star Open Qualifying ==
Shane van Gisbergen scored the pole for the race with a time of 1:28.694 seconds.

=== Open qualifying results ===
Pos	No.	Driver	Team	Manufacturer	Time
1	88	Shane van Gisbergen (R)	Trackhouse Racing	Chevrolet	1:28.684
2	77	Carson Hocevar	Spire Motorsports	Chevrolet	1:28.884
3	4	Noah Gragson	Front Row Motorsports	Ford	1:29.596
4	71	Michael McDowell	Spire Motorsports	Chevrolet	1:29.610
5	60	Ryan Preece	RFK Racing	Ford	1:29.688
6	38	Zane Smith	Front Row Motorsports	Ford	1:30.477
7	7	Justin Haley	Spire Motorsports	Chevrolet	1:30.495
8	42	John Hunter Nemechek	Legacy Motor Club	Toyota	1:30.841
9	54	Ty Gibbs	Joe Gibbs Racing	Toyota	1:30.917
10	10	Ty Dillon	Kaulig Racing	Chevrolet	1:31.444
11	41	Cole Custer	Haas Factory Team	Ford	1:32.050
12	43	Erik Jones	Legacy Motor Club	Toyota	1:35.597
13	35	Riley Herbst (R)	23XI Racing	Toyota	1:39.650
14	23	Bubba Wallace	23XI Racing	Toyota	1:39.690
15	15	Cody Ware	Rick Ware Racing	Ford	1:39.791
16	16	A. J. Allmendinger	Kaulig Racing	Chevrolet	1:50.942
17	34	Todd Gilliland	Front Row Motorsports	Ford	2:02.694
18	66	Chad Finchum	Garage 66	Ford	2:24.024
Official Open qualifying results

== Qualifying (Pit Crew Challenge) ==
The 2025 Pit Crew Challenge set the starting lineup for both the NASCAR All-Star Open and the qualifying heat races. Brad Keselowski scored the pole for Heat Race 1 with a time of 1:27.362 seconds. Christopher Bell scored the pole for Heat Race 2 with a time of 1:28.252 seconds. Michael McDowell's pit crew won the Pit Crew Challenge.

=== Heat Race 1 qualifying results ===
Pos	No.	Driver	Team	Manufacturer	Time
1	6	Brad Keselowski	RFK Racing	Ford	1:27.362
2	48	Alex Bowman	Hendrick Motorsports	Chevrolet	1:28.361
3	24	William Byron	Hendrick Motorsports	Chevrolet	1:29.120
4	3	Austin Dillon	Richard Childress Racing	Chevrolet	1:29.619
5	45	Tyler Reddick	23XI Racing	Toyota	1:30.170
6	47	Ricky Stenhouse Jr.	Hyak Motorsports	Chevrolet	1:30.437
7	21	Josh Berry	Wood Brothers Racing	Ford	1:31.240
8	5	Justin Allgaier (i) (Note: Despite Kyle Larson being on the entry list, he was unable to qualify for the race as he was practicing for the 2025 Indianapolis 500. Justin Allgaier would fill in for him.)	Hendrick Motorsports	Chevrolet	1:34.949
9	1	Ross Chastain	Trackhouse Racing	Chevrolet	1:38.886
10	12	Ryan Blaney	Team Penske	Ford	1:40.337
Heat Race 1 qualifying results

=== Heat Race 2 qualifying results ===
Pos	No.	Driver	Team	Manufacturer	Time
1	20	Christopher Bell	Joe Gibbs Racing	Toyota	1:28.252
2	19	Chase Briscoe	Joe Gibbs Racing	Toyota	1:28.649
3	22	Joey Logano	Team Penske	Ford	1:29.257
4	11	Denny Hamlin	Joe Gibbs Racing	Toyota	1:29.921
5	9	Chase Elliott	Hendrick Motorsports	Chevrolet	1:30.450
6	8	Kyle Busch	Richard Childress Racing	Chevrolet	1:31.223
7	51	Harrison Burton (i)	Rick Ware Racing	Ford	1:34.432
8	17	Chris Buescher	RFK Racing	Ford	1:38.272
9	2	Austin Cindric	Team Penske	Ford	1:39.056
10	99	Daniel Suárez	Trackhouse Racing	Chevrolet	1:46.930
Heat Race 2 qualifying results

== Qualifying heat races ==
=== Heat Race 1 results ===
Pos	Grid	No	Driver	Team	Manufacturer	Laps
1	1	6	Brad Keselowski	RFK Racing	Ford	75
2	9	1	Ross Chastain	Trackhouse Racing	Chevrolet	75
3	3	24	William Byron	Hendrick Motorsports	Chevrolet	75
4	10	12	Ryan Blaney	Team Penske	Ford	75
5	2	48	Alex Bowman	Hendrick Motorsports	Chevrolet	75
6	7	21	Josh Berry	Wood Brothers Racing	Ford	75
7	5	45	Tyler Reddick	23XI Racing	Toyota	75
8	4	3	Austin Dillon	Richard Childress Racing	Chevrolet	75
9	6	47	Ricky Stenhouse Jr.	Hyak Motorsports	Chevrolet	75
10	8	5	Justin Allgaier (i)	Hendrick Motorsports	Chevrolet	0
Official All-Star Heat race 1 results

=== Heat Race 2 results ===
Pos	Grid	No	Driver	Team	Manufacturer	Laps
1	1	20	Christopher Bell	Joe Gibbs Racing	Toyota	75
2	3	22	Joey Logano	Team Penske	Ford	75
3	5	9	Chase Elliott	Hendrick Motorsports	Chevrolet	75
4	6	8	Kyle Busch	Richard Childress Racing	Chevrolet	75
5	8	17	Chris Buescher	RFK Racing	Ford	75
6	10	99	Daniel Suárez	Trackhouse Racing	Chevrolet	75
7	2	19	Chase Briscoe	Joe Gibbs Racing	Toyota	75
8	9	2	Austin Cindric	Team Penske	Ford	75
9	7	51	Harrison Burton (i)	Rick Ware Racing	Ford	75
10	4	11	Denny Hamlin	Joe Gibbs Racing	Toyota	75
Official All-Star Heat race 2 results

=== NASCAR All-Star Race Starting Lineup ===
Pos	No.	Driver	Team	Manufacturer	Notes
1	6	Brad Keselowski	RFK Racing	Ford	Heat Race 1 Winner
2	20	Christopher Bell	Joe Gibbs Racing	Toyota	Heat Race 2 Winner
3	1	Ross Chastain	Trackhouse Racing	Chevrolet	2nd in Heat Race 1
4	22	Joey Logano	Team Penske	Ford	2nd in Heat Race 2
5	24	William Byron	Hendrick Motorsports	Chevrolet	3rd in Heat Race 1
6	9	Chase Elliott	Hendrick Motorsports	Chevrolet	3rd in Heat Race 2
7	12	Ryan Blaney	Team Penske	Ford	4th in Heat Race 1
8	8	Kyle Busch	Richard Childress Racing	Chevrolet	4th in Heat Race 2
9	48	Alex Bowman	Hendrick Motorsports	Chevrolet	5th in Heat Race 1
10	17	Chris Buescher	RFK Racing	Ford	5th in Heat Race 2
11	21	Josh Berry	Wood Brothers Racing	Ford	6th in Heat Race 1
12	99	Daniel Suárez	Trackhouse Racing	Chevrolet	6th in Heat Race 2
13	45	Tyler Reddick	23XI Racing	Toyota	7th in Heat Race 1
14	19	Chase Briscoe	Joe Gibbs Racing	Toyota	7th in Heat Race 2
15	3	Austin Dillon	Richard Childress Racing	Chevrolet	8th in Heat Race 1
16	2	Austin Cindric	Team Penske	Ford	8th in Heat Race 2
17	47	Ricky Stenhouse Jr.	Hyak Motorsports	Chevrolet	9th in Heat Race 1
18	51	Harrison Burton (i)	Rick Ware Racing	Ford	9th in Heat Race 2
19	5	Kyle Larson	Hendrick Motorsports	Chevrolet	10th in Heat Race 1
20	11	Denny Hamlin	Joe Gibbs Racing	Toyota	10th in Heat Race 2
21	77	Carson Hocevar	Spire Motorsports	Chevrolet	All Star Open Winner
22	42	John Hunter Nemechek	Legacy Motor Club	Toyota	All Star Open Runner-up
23	4	Noah Gragson	Front Row Motorsports	Ford	Fan Vote Winner
Official starting lineup

== NASCAR All Star Open ==
=== NASCAR All Star Open results ===
Pos	Grid	No	Driver	Team	Manufacturer	Laps
1	2	77	Carson Hocevar	Spire Motorsports	Chevrolet	100
2	8	42	John Hunter Nemechek	Legacy Motor Club	Toyota	100
3	10	10	Ty Dillon	Kaulig Racing	Chevrolet	100
4	12	43	Erik Jones	Legacy Motor Club	Toyota	100
5	4	71	Michael McDowell	Spire Motorsports	Chevrolet	100
6	6	38	Zane Smith	Front Row Motorsports	Ford	100
7	16	16	A. J. Allmendinger	Kaulig Racing	Chevrolet	100
8	14	23	Bubba Wallace	23XI Racing	Toyota	100
9	11	41	Cole Custer	Haas Factory Team	Ford	100
10	13	35	Riley Herbst (R)	23XI Racing	Toyota	100
11	5	60	Ryan Preece	RFK Racing	Ford	100
12	17	34	Todd Gilliland	Front Row Motorsports	Ford	100
13	1	88	Shane van Gisbergen (R)	Trackhouse Racing	Chevrolet	100
14	7	7	Justin Haley	Spire Motorsports	Chevrolet	100
15	9	54	Ty Gibbs	Joe Gibbs Racing	Toyota	100
16	15	15	Cody Ware	Rick Ware Racing	Ford	100
17	3	4	Noah Gragson	Front Row Motorsports	Ford	100
18	18	66	Chad Finchum	Garage 66	Ford	100
Official NASCAR All Star Open race results

== NASCAR All Star Race ==
=== NASCAR All Star Race results ===
Pos	Grid	No	Driver	Team	Manufacturer	Laps
1	2	20	Christopher Bell	Joe Gibbs Racing	Toyota	250
2	4	22	Joey Logano	Team Penske	Ford	250
3	3	1	Ross Chastain	Trackhouse Racing	Chevrolet	250
4	9	48	Alex Bowman	Hendrick Motorsports	Chevrolet	250
5	6	9	Chase Elliott	Hendrick Motorsports	Chevrolet	250
6	5	24	William Byron	Hendrick Motorsports	Chevrolet	250
7	13	45	Tyler Reddick	23XI Racing	Toyota	250
8	8	8	Kyle Busch	Richard Childress Racing	Chevrolet	250
9	14	19	Chase Briscoe	Joe Gibbs Racing	Toyota	250
10	10	17	Chris Buescher	RFK Racing	Ford	250
11	21	77	Carson Hocevar	Spire Motorsports	Chevrolet	250
12	20	11	Denny Hamlin	Joe Gibbs Racing	Toyota	250
13	23	4	Noah Gragson	Front Row Motorsports	Ford	250
14	15	3	Austin Dillon	Richard Childress Racing	Chevrolet	250
15	17	47	Ricky Stenhouse Jr.	Hyak Motorsports	Chevrolet	250
16	7	12	Ryan Blaney	Team Penske	Ford	250
17	11	21	Josh Berry	Wood Brothers Racing	Ford	250
18	16	2	Austin Cindric	Team Penske	Ford	250
19	22	42	John Hunter Nemechek	Legacy Motor Club	Toyota	250
20	18	51	Harrison Burton (i)	Rick Ware Racing	Ford	250
21	19	5	Kyle Larson	Hendrick Motorsports	Chevrolet	247
22	1	6	Brad Keselowski	RFK Racing	Ford	175
23	12	99	Daniel Suárez	Trackhouse Racing	Chevrolet	63
Official NASCAR All-Star Race results

== Media ==
=== Television ===
Fox Sports was the television broadcaster of the race in the United States. Lap-by-lap announcer, Mike Joy, Clint Bowyer, and two-time All-Star race winner Kevin Harvick called the race from the broadcast booth. Jamie Little and Regan Smith handled pit road for the television side. Larry McReynolds provided insight on-site during the race.

FS1
Booth announcers	Pit reporters	In-race analyst
Lap-by-lap: Mike Joy; Color-commentator: Clint Bowyer; Color-commentator: Kevin Harvick	Jamie Little; Regan Smith	Larry McReynolds

=== Radio ===
Motor Racing Network (MRN) continued their longstanding relationship with Speedway Motorsports to broadcast the race on radio. The lead announcers for the race's broadcast were Alex Hayden, Mike Bagley, and 1989 winner of the All-Star Race Rusty Wallace. The network also had one announcer stationed in turn 4: Dave Moody. Steve Post, Jacklyn Drake and Chris Wilner were the network's pit lane reporters. The network's broadcast was also simulcasted on Sirius XM NASCAR Radio.

MRN Radio
Booth announcers	Turn announcers	Pit reporters
Lead announcer: Alex Hayden; Announcer: Mike Bagley; Announcer: Rusty Wallace	Turn 4: Dave Moody	Steve Post; Jacklyn Drake; Chris Wilner

== Notes ==
Previous race: 2025 AdventHealth 400	NASCAR Cup Series; 2025 season	Next race: 2025 Coca-Cola 600
