= 2024 NASCAR All-Star Race =

40th iteration of the NASCAR All-Star Race

Race details
- Date: May 19, 2024
- Location: North Wilkesboro Speedway in North Wilkesboro, North Carolina, U.S.
- Course: Permanent racing facility 0.625 mi (1.006 km)
- Distance: Open: 100 laps, 62.5 mi (100.6 km); All-Star Race: 200 Laps, 125 mi (201 km)
- Avg Speed: Open: 98.728 mph (158.887 km/h); All-Star Race: 93.809 mph (150.971 km/h)

NASCAR All Star Open
- Pole: Ty Gibbs (Joe Gibbs Racing)
- Time: N/A
- Winner: Ty Gibbs (Joe Gibbs Racing)
- Fan Vote winner: Noah Gragson (Stewart-Haas Racing)

NASCAR All-Star Race
- Pole: Joey Logano (Team Penske)
- Time: 1:29.754
- Most laps led: Joey Logano (Team Penske)
- Laps: 199
- Winner: Joey Logano (Team Penske)

Television
- Network: FS1
- Announcers: Mike Joy, Clint Bowyer, and Kevin Harvick

Radio
- Network: Motor Racing Network
- Announcers: Alex Hayden, Jeff Striegle and Rusty Wallace (Booth); Dave Moody (4) (Turns)

The 2024 NASCAR All-Star Race (XL) was a non-championship NASCAR Cup Series stock car exhibition race that was held on May 19, 2024 at North Wilkesboro Speedway in North Wilkesboro, North Carolina. Contested over 200 laps, it was the second exhibition race of the 2024 NASCAR Cup Series season.

== Report ==
=== Background ===
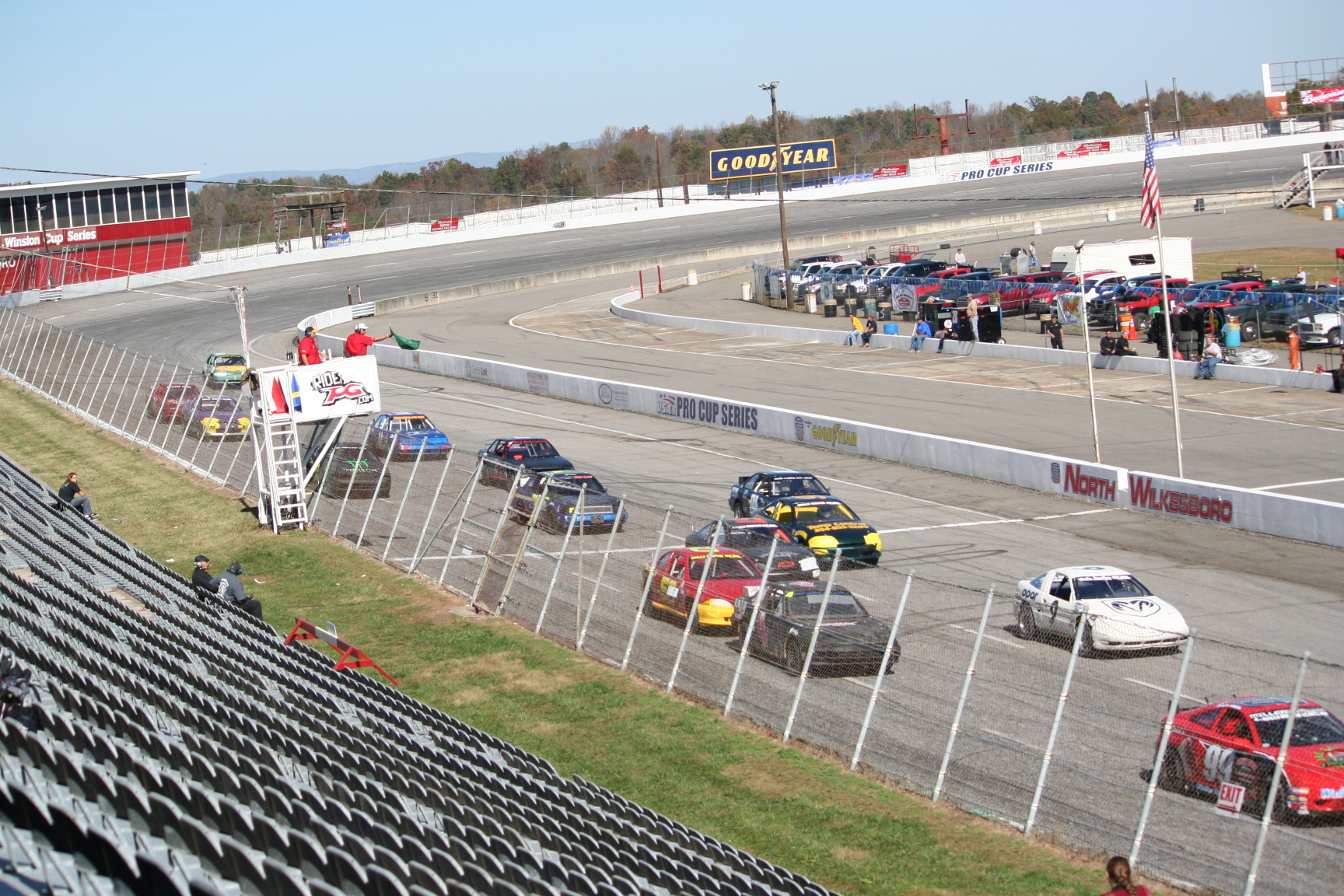
North Wilkesboro Speedway

The All-Star Race is open to race winners from last season through the 2024 Goodyear 400 at Darlington Raceway, all previous All-Star race winners, NASCAR Cup champions who had attempted to qualify for every race in 2023, the top two race finishers of the All-Star Open, and the winner of the All-Star fan vote are eligible to compete in the All-Star Race.

==== Entry list ====
- (R) denotes rookie driver.
- (i) denotes driver who is ineligible for series driver points.

===== NASCAR All-Star Open =====
No.	Driver	Team	Manufacturer
2	Austin Cindric	Team Penske	Ford
3	Austin Dillon	Richard Childress Racing	Chevrolet
4	Josh Berry (R)	Stewart-Haas Racing	Ford
7	Corey LaJoie	Spire Motorsports	Chevrolet
10	Noah Gragson	Stewart-Haas Racing	Ford
14	Chase Briscoe	Stewart-Haas Racing	Ford
15	Kaz Grala (R)	Rick Ware Racing	Ford
21	Harrison Burton	Wood Brothers Racing	Ford
23	Bubba Wallace	23XI Racing	Toyota
31	Daniel Hemric	Kaulig Racing	Chevrolet
38	Todd Gilliland	Front Row Motorsports	Ford
41	Ryan Preece	Stewart-Haas Racing	Ford
42	John Hunter Nemechek	Legacy Motor Club	Toyota
43	Erik Jones	Legacy Motor Club	Toyota
48	Alex Bowman	Hendrick Motorsports	Chevrolet
51	Justin Haley	Rick Ware Racing	Ford
54	Ty Gibbs	Joe Gibbs Racing	Toyota
66	Timmy Hill (i)	MBM Motorsports	Ford
71	Zane Smith (R)	Spire Motorsports	Chevrolet
77	Carson Hocevar (R)	Spire Motorsports	Chevrolet
Official entry list

===== NASCAR All-Star Race =====
No.	Driver	Team	Manufacturer
1	Ross Chastain	Trackhouse Racing	Chevrolet
5	Kyle Larson	Hendrick Motorsports	Chevrolet
6	Brad Keselowski	RFK Racing	Ford
8	Kyle Busch	Richard Childress Racing	Chevrolet
9	Chase Elliott	Hendrick Motorsports	Chevrolet
11	Denny Hamlin	Joe Gibbs Racing	Toyota
12	Ryan Blaney	Team Penske	Ford
16	A. J. Allmendinger (i)	Kaulig Racing	Chevrolet
17	Chris Buescher	RFK Racing	Ford
19	Martin Truex Jr.	Joe Gibbs Racing	Toyota
20	Christopher Bell	Joe Gibbs Racing	Toyota
22	Joey Logano	Team Penske	Ford
24	William Byron	Hendrick Motorsports	Chevrolet
34	Michael McDowell	Front Row Motorsports	Ford
45	Tyler Reddick	23XI Racing	Toyota
47	Ricky Stenhouse Jr.	JTG Daugherty Racing	Chevrolet
99	Daniel Suárez	Trackhouse Racing	Chevrolet
Official entry list

== Practice ==
=== Practice results ===
Ty Gibbs was the fastest in the practice session with a time of 18.145 seconds and a speed of 124.001 mph (199.560 km/h).

Pos	No.	Driver	Team	Manufacturer	Time	Speed
1	54	Ty Gibbs	Joe Gibbs Racing	Toyota	18.145	124.001
2	12	Ryan Blaney	Team Penske	Ford	18.176	123.790
3	20	Christopher Bell	Joe Gibbs Racing	Toyota	18.210	123.558
Official practice results

== All-Star Open Qualifying ==
Qualifying for the All-Star Open was cancelled due to inclement weather. The starting lineup was set by owner points. Ty Gibbs started on the pole for the Open.

=== Open starting lineup ===
Pos	No.	Driver	Team	Manufacturer
1	54	Ty Gibbs	Joe Gibbs Racing	Toyota
2	48	Alex Bowman	Hendrick Motorsports	Chevrolet
3	14	Chase Briscoe	Stewart-Haas Racing	Ford
4	23	Bubba Wallace	23XI Racing	Toyota
5	10	Noah Gragson	Stewart-Haas Racing	Ford
6	2	Austin Cindric	Team Penske	Ford
7	4	Josh Berry (R)	Stewart-Haas Racing	Ford
8	38	Todd Gilliland	Front Row Motorsports	Ford
9	42	John Hunter Nemechek	Legacy Motor Club	Toyota
10	77	Carson Hocevar (R)	Spire Motorsports	Chevrolet
11	43	Erik Jones	Legacy Motor Club	Toyota
12	41	Ryan Preece	Stewart-Haas Racing	Ford
13	7	Corey LaJoie	Spire Motorsports	Chevrolet
14	31	Daniel Hemric	Kaulig Racing	Chevrolet
15	3	Austin Dillon	Richard Childress Racing	Chevrolet
16	51	Justin Haley	Rick Ware Racing	Ford
17	21	Harrison Burton	Wood Brothers Racing	Ford
18	15	Kaz Grala (R)	Rick Ware Racing	Ford
19	71	Zane Smith (R)	Spire Motorsports	Chevrolet
20	66	Timmy Hill (i)	MBM Motorsports	Ford
Official Open starting lineup

== Qualifying (Pit Crew Challenge) ==
The 2024 Pit Crew Challenge set the starting lineup for both the NASCAR All-Star qualifying heat races. Joey Logano scored the pole for Heat Race 1 as well as the main event with a time of 1:29.754. Brad Keselowski scored the pole for Heat Race 2 with a time of 1:30.140. Christopher Bell's pit crew won the Pit Crew Challenge with a pit time of 13.223 seconds.

=== Heat Race 1 qualifying results ===
Pos	No.	Driver	Team	Manufacturer	Time
1	22	Joey Logano	Team Penske	Ford	1:29.754
2	20	Christopher Bell	Joe Gibbs Racing	Toyota	1:30.169
3	17	Chris Buescher	RFK Racing	Ford	1:30.288
4	1	Ross Chastain	Trackhouse Racing	Chevrolet	1:30.766
5	34	Michael McDowell	Front Row Motorsports	Ford	1:30.994
6	11	Denny Hamlin	Joe Gibbs Racing	Toyota	1:31.846
7	24	William Byron	Hendrick Motorsports	Chevrolet	1:39.542
8	9	Chase Elliott	Hendrick Motorsports	Chevrolet	1:42.518
9	12	Ryan Blaney	Team Penske	Ford	1:49.890
Heat Race 1 qualifying results

=== Heat Race 2 qualifying results ===
Pos	No.	Driver	Team	Manufacturer	Time
1	6	Brad Keselowski	RFK Racing	Ford	1:30.140
2	99	Daniel Suárez	Trackhouse Racing	Chevrolet	1:30.199
3	45	Tyler Reddick	23XI Racing	Toyota	1:30.666
4	19	Martin Truex Jr.	Joe Gibbs Racing	Toyota	1:30.946
5	16	A. J. Allmendinger (i)	Kaulig Racing	Chevrolet	1:31.674
6	5	Kevin Harvick (Note: Kevin Harvick practiced and qualified the car for Kyle Larson while Larson was in Indianapolis practicing & qualifying for the Indianapolis 500.)	Hendrick Motorsports	Chevrolet	1:36.334
7	8	Kyle Busch	Richard Childress Racing	Chevrolet	1:39.788
8	47	Ricky Stenhouse Jr.	JTG Daugherty Racing	Chevrolet	1:43.314
Heat Race 2 qualifying results

== Qualifying heat races ==
The qualifying heat races were cancelled due to torrential rains and flooding at the speedway. As a result, NASCAR resorted to the morning qualifying session to set the starting lineup.

=== NASCAR All-Star Race Starting Lineup ===
Pos	No.	Driver	Team	Manufacturer	Notes
1	22	Joey Logano	Team Penske	Ford	
2	6	Brad Keselowski	RFK Racing	Ford	
3	20	Christopher Bell	Joe Gibbs Racing	Toyota	
4	99	Daniel Suárez	Trackhouse Racing	Chevrolet	
5	17	Chris Buescher	RFK Racing	Ford	
6	45	Tyler Reddick	23XI Racing	Toyota	
7	1	Ross Chastain	Trackhouse Racing	Chevrolet	
8	19	Martin Truex Jr.	Joe Gibbs Racing	Toyota	
9	34	Michael McDowell	Front Row Motorsports	Ford	
10	16	A. J. Allmendinger (i)	Kaulig Racing	Chevrolet	
11	11	Denny Hamlin	Joe Gibbs Racing	Toyota	
12	5	Kyle Larson	Hendrick Motorsports	Chevrolet	
13	24	William Byron	Hendrick Motorsports	Chevrolet	
14	8	Kyle Busch	Richard Childress Racing	Chevrolet	
15	9	Chase Elliott	Hendrick Motorsports	Chevrolet	
16	47	Ricky Stenhouse Jr.	JTG Daugherty Racing	Chevrolet	
17	12	Ryan Blaney	Team Penske	Ford	
18	54	Ty Gibbs	Joe Gibbs Racing	Toyota	All-Star Open Winner
19	23	Bubba Wallace	23XI Racing	Toyota	All-Star Open Runner-Up
20	10	Noah Gragson	Stewart-Haas Racing	Ford	All-Star Fan Vote Winner
Official starting lineup

== NASCAR All Star Open ==
=== NASCAR All Star Open results ===
Pos	Grid	No	Driver	Team	Manufacturer	Laps
1	1	54	Ty Gibbs	Joe Gibbs Racing	Toyota	100
2	4	23	Bubba Wallace	23XI Racing	Toyota	100
3	7	4	Josh Berry (R)	Stewart-Haas Racing	Ford	100
4	16	51	Justin Haley	Rick Ware Racing	Ford	100
5	5	10	Noah Gragson	Stewart-Haas Racing	Ford	100
6	2	48	Alex Bowman	Hendrick Motorsports	Chevrolet	100
7	3	14	Chase Briscoe	Stewart-Haas Racing	Ford	100
8	12	41	Ryan Preece	Stewart-Haas Racing	Ford	100
9	15	3	Austin Dillon	Richard Childress Racing	Chevrolet	100
10	10	77	Carson Hocevar (R)	Spire Motorsports	Chevrolet	100
11	18	15	Kaz Grala (R)	Rick Ware Racing	Ford	100
12	13	7	Corey LaJoie	Spire Motorsports	Chevrolet	100
13	17	21	Harrison Burton	Wood Brothers Racing	Ford	100
14	9	42	John Hunter Nemechek	Legacy Motor Club	Toyota	100
15	8	38	Todd Gilliland	Front Row Motorsports	Ford	100
16	14	31	Daniel Hemric	Kaulig Racing	Chevrolet	100
17	19	71	Zane Smith (R)	Spire Motorsports	Chevrolet	100
18	11	43	Erik Jones	Legacy Motor Club	Toyota	100
19	20	66	Timmy Hill (i)	MBM Motorsports	Ford	93
20	6	2	Austin Cindric	Team Penske	Ford	82
Official NASCAR All Star Open race results

== NASCAR All Star Race ==
=== Post-race fight ===
On the first lap of the race, Ricky Stenhouse Jr. went 3-wide between Denny Hamlin and Kyle Busch, causing Busch to hit the outside wall off of turn 2. Upset with that, Busch retaliated and wrecked Stenhouse on the very next lap, again in turn 2, taking Stenhouse out of the race. Stenhouse parked his car in Busch's pit stall where he had a conversation with Busch's crew chief Randall Burnett. In his interview, Stenhouse quoted "Maybe Richard [Childress] will hold my watch after the race", a reference to an altercation between Childress and Busch in 2011. After the race was over, Stenhouse waited outside of Busch's hauler to confront him and the two had a conversation that got more heated after both began to disagree with what happened on the track. After Stenhouse told Busch to "go back and watch it", he threw a punch at Busch that connected and the two got into a fistfight with Stenhouse's father Ricky Stenhouse Sr. trying to hold Busch back before Busch started attacking him too. The two got separated with both their crew members getting involved as well. The two had another heated conversation while both were getting held back to where Stenhouse said "I'll wreck you at Charlotte", to which Busch replied "Bring it! I don't give a fuck! I suck just as bad as you! Let's go!" Stenhouse Jr. was fined $75,000, Stenhouse Sr. was suspended indefinitely, team mechanic Clint Myrick was suspended for 8 races, and team member Keith Matthews was suspended for 4 races for their involvement in the fight.

=== NASCAR All Star Race results ===
Pos	Grid	No	Driver	Team	Manufacturer	Laps
1	1	22	Joey Logano	Team Penske	Ford	200
2	11	11	Denny Hamlin	Joe Gibbs Racing	Toyota	200
3	5	17	Chris Buescher	RFK Racing	Ford	200
4	12	5	Kyle Larson	Hendrick Motorsports	Chevrolet	200
5	17	12	Ryan Blaney	Team Penske	Ford	200
6	19	23	Bubba Wallace	23XI Racing	Toyota	200
7	7	1	Ross Chastain	Trackhouse Racing	Chevrolet	200
8	15	9	Chase Elliott	Hendrick Motorsports	Chevrolet	200
9	9	34	Michael McDowell	Front Row Motorsports	Ford	200
10	14	8	Kyle Busch	Richard Childress Racing	Chevrolet	200
11	20	10	Noah Gragson	Stewart-Haas Racing	Ford	200
12	8	19	Martin Truex Jr.	Joe Gibbs Racing	Toyota	200
13	17	54	Ty Gibbs	Joe Gibbs Racing	Toyota	200
14	6	45	Tyler Reddick	23XI Racing	Toyota	200
15	4	99	Daniel Suárez	Trackhouse Racing	Chevrolet	200
16	2	6	Brad Keselowski	RFK Racing	Ford	200
17	3	20	Christopher Bell	Joe Gibbs Racing	Toyota	200
18	10	16	A. J. Allmendinger (i)	Kaulig Racing	Chevrolet	198
19	13	24	William Byron	Hendrick Motorsports	Chevrolet	186
20	16	47	Ricky Stenhouse Jr.	JTG Daugherty Racing	Chevrolet	2
Official NASCAR All-Star Race results

== Media ==
=== Television ===
Fox Sports was the television broadcaster of the race in the United States. Lap-by-lap announcer Mike Joy, Clint Bowyer, and two-time All-Star race winner Kevin Harvick called the race from the broadcast booth. Jamie Little and Regan Smith handled the pit road for the television side. Larry McReynolds provided insight on-site during the race.

FS1
Booth announcers	Pit reporters	In-race analyst
Lap-by-lap: Mike Joy; Color-commentator: Clint Bowyer; Color-commentator: Kevin Harvick	Jamie Little; Regan Smith	Larry McReynolds

=== Radio ===
Motor Racing Network (MRN) continued their longstanding relationship with Speedway Motorsports to broadcast the race on radio. The lead announcers for the race's broadcast were Alex Hayden, Jeff Striegle, and 1989 winner of the All-Star Race Rusty Wallace. The network also had an announcer stationed in turn 4, Dave Moody. Lead Pit Reporter Steve Post, Brienne Pedigo and Chris Wilner were the network's pit lane reporters. The network's broadcast was also simulcasted on Sirius XM NASCAR Radio.

MRN Radio
Booth announcers	Turn announcers	Pit reporters
Lead announcer: Alex Hayden; Announcer: Jeff Striegle; Announcer: Rusty Wallace	Turn 4: Dave Moody	Steve Post; Brienne Pedigo; Chris Wilner
