= 2026 Coca-Cola 600 =

NASCAR Cup Series race

Race details
- Race 13 of 36 in the 2026 NASCAR Cup Series
- Date: May 24, 2026
- Location: Charlotte Motor Speedway in Concord, North Carolina, U.S.
- Course: Permanent racing facility
- Course length: 1.5 miles (2.4 km)
- Distance: 373 laps, 559.5 mi (895.2 km)
- Scheduled distance: 400 laps, 600 mi (965.6 km)
- Weather: Mostly cloudy 80 °F (27 °C)
- Average speed: 119.921 miles per hour (192.994 km/h)

Pole position
Driver	Tyler Reddick	23XI Racing
- Grid positions set by competition-based formula

Most laps led
Driver	Tyler Reddick	23XI Racing
- Laps: 119

Fastest lap
Driver	Ty Gibbs	Joe Gibbs Racing
- Time: 00:29.667

Winner
No. 7	Daniel Suárez	Spire Motorsports

Television in the United States
- Network: Prime Video
- Announcers: Adam Alexander, Dale Earnhardt Jr., and Steve Letarte
- Nielsen ratings: 1.07 (2.649 million)

Radio in the United States
- Radio: PRN
- Booth announcers: Brad Gillie and Alex Hayden
- Turn announcers: Andrew Kurland (1 & 2) and Pat Patterson (3 & 4)

The 2026 Coca-Cola 600 was an NASCAR Cup Series race that was held on May 24, 2026, at Charlotte Motor Speedway in Concord, North Carolina and the 67th running of the event. Originally scheduled for 400 laps on the 1.5-mile (2.4 km) asphalt speedway, the race was shortened to 373 laps due to rain. It was the 13th race of the 2026 NASCAR Cup Series season, as well as the second of the four crown jewel races.

Daniel Suárez won the race, his first win of the season and the third of his career. Christopher Bell finished 2nd, and Denny Hamlin finished 3rd. Tyler Reddick and Kyle Larson rounded out the top five, and Ty Gibbs, Ryan Blaney, Joey Logano, William Byron, and Zane Smith rounded out the top ten.

== Report ==
=== Background ===
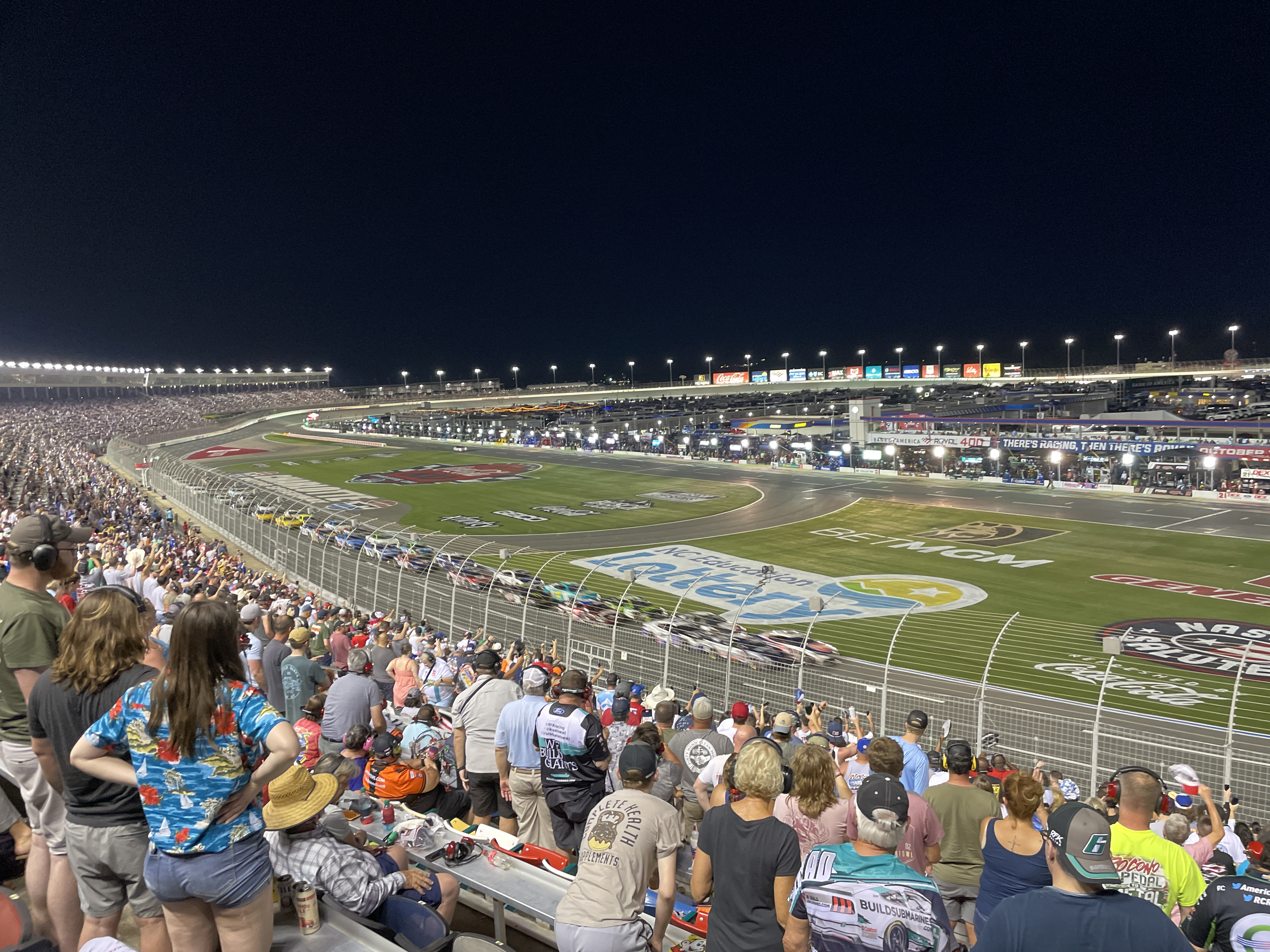
Charlotte Motor Speedway, the track where the race was held.

The race was held at Charlotte Motor Speedway, located in Concord, North Carolina. The speedway complex includes a 1.5-mile (2.4 km) quad-oval track is utilized for the race, as well as a dragstrip and a dirt track. The speedway was built in 1959 by Bruton Smith and is considered the home track for NASCAR with many race teams based in the Charlotte metropolitan area. The track is owned and operated by Speedway Motorsports Inc. (SMI) with Marcus G. Smith serving as track president.

Storylines

For the third year in a row, a driver attempted to complete the "Double Duty," as Katherine Legge attempted to compete in both the Indianapolis 500 and Coca-Cola 600 on the same day. After crashing out early in the Indianapolis 500, Legge reached Charlotte and raced the Coca-Cola 600, finishing the latter 12 laps behind the winner and in 31st place, last among cars still in the race.

Kyle Busch was scheduled to race but died on May 21, three days prior to the race, from complications with pneumonia. Austin Hill raced in Busch's stead, and Richard Childress Racing later changed the number 8 entry to number 33 and announced that the number 8 would be reserved for Busch's son when he begins his NASCAR Cup career. Before the start, NASCAR CEO Steve O'Donnell honored the late driver with a moment of silence. There was a missing man formation during the pace laps, as well as a silent lap on lap 8. Busch was also remembered at the Indianapolis 500 earlier that day.

==== Entry list ====
- (R) denotes rookie driver.
- (i) denotes driver who is ineligible for series driver points.

No.	Driver	Team	Manufacturer	"600 Miles of Remembrance"
1	Ross Chastain	Trackhouse Racing	Chevrolet	Johnathan B. McCain
2	Austin Cindric	Team Penske	Ford	Glen Jacob Whetten
3	Austin Dillon	Richard Childress Racing	Chevrolet	Matthew Paul Steyart
4	Noah Gragson	Front Row Motorsports	Ford	Matthew Ammerman
5	Kyle Larson	Hendrick Motorsports	Chevrolet	Ryan Christopher Malm
6	Brad Keselowski	RFK Racing	Ford	William C. Hooks
7	Daniel Suárez	Spire Motorsports	Chevrolet	Martin Anthony Lugo Jr.
9	Chase Elliott	Hendrick Motorsports	Chevrolet	Frank Perrone
10	Ty Dillon	Kaulig Racing	Chevrolet	Christopher Horton
11	Denny Hamlin	Joe Gibbs Racing	Toyota	Michael H. Ollis
12	Ryan Blaney	Team Penske	Ford	Thomas Lazzaro
16	A. J. Allmendinger	Kaulig Racing	Chevrolet	Zainah "Caye" Creamer
17	Chris Buescher	RFK Racing	Ford	Bobby Frank Limerick
19	Chase Briscoe	Joe Gibbs Racing	Toyota	Ace Wayne Tyler
20	Christopher Bell	Joe Gibbs Racing	Toyota	Nicholas P. DiMona ll
21	Josh Berry	Wood Brothers Racing	Ford	John Calvin Morgan
22	Joey Logano	Team Penske	Ford	John R. Wheatley Jr.
23	Bubba Wallace	23XI Racing	Toyota	Ross A. Pennanen
24	William Byron	Hendrick Motorsports	Chevrolet	William Jacobsen
33	Austin Hill (i)	Richard Childress Racing	Chevrolet	Matthew Donald Burns
34	Todd Gilliland	Front Row Motorsports	Ford	Michael L. Wright
35	Riley Herbst	23XI Racing	Toyota	Christopher Chambers
38	Zane Smith	Front Row Motorsports	Ford	Willis Earl Norris
41	Cole Custer	Haas Factory Team	Chevrolet	Ralph Earle Hines
42	John Hunter Nemechek	Legacy Motor Club	Toyota	Glenn L. Harris
43	Erik Jones	Legacy Motor Club	Toyota	Jason Plite
45	Tyler Reddick	23XI Racing	Toyota	Robert Wayne Crow Jr.
47	Ricky Stenhouse Jr.	Hyak Motorsports	Chevrolet	Brent T. Vroman
48	Alex Bowman	Hendrick Motorsports	Chevrolet	Reuben Marcus Fernandez III
51	Cody Ware	Rick Ware Racing	Chevrolet	Eric Parker Brice
54	Ty Gibbs	Joe Gibbs Racing	Toyota	Jack Zygmunt Sky
60	Ryan Preece	RFK Racing	Ford	Michael David Verardo
66	Timmy Hill (i)	Garage 66	Ford	Richard A. Bowman
67	Corey Heim (i)	23XI Racing	Toyota	Nathan Gage Ingram
71	Michael McDowell	Spire Motorsports	Chevrolet	Eddie Wade Forrest ll
77	Carson Hocevar	Spire Motorsports	Chevrolet	Mark Cardillo
78	Katherine Legge	Live Fast Motorsports	Chevrolet	Kevin Norman
88	Connor Zilisch (R)	Trackhouse Racing	Chevrolet	Eugene Ashley Jr.
97	Shane van Gisbergen	Trackhouse Racing	Chevrolet	Anthony J. Smaka
Official entry list

== Practice ==
Ricky Stenhouse Jr. was the fastest in the practice session with a time of 29.069 seconds and a speed of 185.765 mph (298.960 km/h).

=== Practice results ===
Pos	No.	Driver	Team	Manufacturer	Time	Speed
1	47	Ricky Stenhouse Jr.	Hyak Motorsports	Chevrolet	29.069	185.765
2	77	Carson Hocevar	Spire Motorsports	Chevrolet	29.175	185.090
3	71	Michael McDowell	Spire Motorsports	Chevrolet	29.200	184.932
Official practice results

== Qualifying ==
Qualifying for the race was canceled due to inclement weather. Tyler Reddick was awarded the pole for the race as a result of NASCAR's pandemic formula with a score of 3.800.

=== Starting lineup ===
Pos	No.	Driver	Team	Manufacturer
1	45	Tyler Reddick	23XI Racing	Toyota
2	54	Ty Gibbs	Joe Gibbs Racing	Toyota
3	97	Shane van Gisbergen	Trackhouse Racing	Chevrolet
4	71	Michael McDowell	Spire Motorsports	Chevrolet
5	19	Chase Briscoe	Joe Gibbs Racing	Toyota
6	12	Ryan Blaney	Team Penske	Ford
7	17	Chris Buescher	RFK Racing	Ford
8	2	Austin Cindric	Team Penske	Ford
9	3	Austin Dillon	Richard Childress Racing	Chevrolet
10	16	A. J. Allmendinger	Kaulig Racing	Chevrolet
11	11	Denny Hamlin	Joe Gibbs Racing	Toyota
12	60	Ryan Preece	RFK Racing	Ford
13	33	Austin Hill (i)	Richard Childress Racing	Chevrolet
14	7	Daniel Suárez	Spire Motorsports	Chevrolet
15	42	John Hunter Nemechek	Legacy Motor Club	Toyota
16	9	Chase Elliott	Hendrick Motorsports	Chevrolet
17	20	Christopher Bell	Joe Gibbs Racing	Toyota
18	5	Kyle Larson	Hendrick Motorsports	Chevrolet
19	38	Zane Smith	Front Row Motorsports	Ford
20	34	Todd Gilliland	Front Row Motorsports	Ford
21	43	Erik Jones	Legacy Motor Club	Toyota
22	41	Cole Custer	Haas Factory Team	Chevrolet
23	77	Carson Hocevar	Spire Motorsports	Chevrolet
24	23	Bubba Wallace	23XI Racing	Toyota
25	88	Connor Zilisch (R)	Trackhouse Racing	Chevrolet
26	6	Brad Keselowski	RFK Racing	Ford
27	1	Ross Chastain	Trackhouse Racing	Chevrolet
28	4	Noah Gragson	Front Row Motorsports	Ford
29	48	Alex Bowman	Hendrick Motorsports	Chevrolet
30	35	Riley Herbst	23XI Racing	Toyota
31	24	William Byron	Hendrick Motorsports	Chevrolet
32	47	Ricky Stenhouse Jr.	Hyak Motorsports	Chevrolet
33	22	Joey Logano	Team Penske	Ford
34	21	Josh Berry	Wood Brothers Racing	Ford
35	10	Ty Dillon	Kaulig Racing	Chevrolet
36	66	Timmy Hill (i)	Garage 66	Ford
37	78	Katherine Legge	Live Fast Motorsports	Chevrolet
38	51	Cody Ware	Rick Ware Racing	Chevrolet
39	67	Corey Heim (i)	23XI Racing	Toyota
Official starting lineup

== Race ==
Pre-race view from turn 1

=== Race results ===
==== Stage results ====
Stage One Laps: 100

Pos	No	Driver	Team	Manufacturer	Points
1	5	Kyle Larson	Hendrick Motorsports	Chevrolet	10
2	19	Chase Briscoe	Joe Gibbs Racing	Toyota	9
3	45	Tyler Reddick	23XI Racing	Toyota	8
4	11	Denny Hamlin	Joe Gibbs Racing	Toyota	7
5	43	Erik Jones	Legacy Motor Club	Toyota	6
6	12	Ryan Blaney	Team Penske	Ford	5
7	54	Ty Gibbs	Joe Gibbs Racing	Toyota	4
8	60	Ryan Preece	RFK Racing	Ford	3
9	47	Ricky Stenhouse Jr.	Hyak Motorsports	Chevrolet	2
10	97	Shane van Gisbergen	Trackhouse Racing	Chevrolet	1

Stage Two Laps: 100

Pos	No	Driver	Team	Manufacturer	Points
1	11	Denny Hamlin	Joe Gibbs Racing	Toyota	10
2	54	Ty Gibbs	Joe Gibbs Racing	Toyota	9
3	19	Chase Briscoe	Joe Gibbs Racing	Toyota	8
4	45	Tyler Reddick	23XI Racing	Toyota	7
5	5	Kyle Larson	Hendrick Motorsports	Chevrolet	6
6	20	Christopher Bell	Joe Gibbs Racing	Toyota	5
7	12	Ryan Blaney	Team Penske	Ford	4
8	17	Chris Buescher	RFK Racing	Ford	3
9	97	Shane van Gisbergen	Trackhouse Racing	Chevrolet	2
10	47	Ricky Stenhouse Jr.	Hyak Motorsports	Chevrolet	1

Stage Three Laps: 100

Pos	No	Driver	Team	Manufacturer	Points
1	20	Christopher Bell	Joe Gibbs Racing	Toyota	10
2	11	Denny Hamlin	Joe Gibbs Racing	Toyota	9
3	54	Ty Gibbs	Joe Gibbs Racing	Toyota	8
4	19	Chase Briscoe	Joe Gibbs Racing	Toyota	7
5	5	Kyle Larson	Hendrick Motorsports	Chevrolet	6
6	45	Tyler Reddick	23XI Racing	Toyota	5
7	97	Shane van Gisbergen	Trackhouse Racing	Chevrolet	4
8	6	Brad Keselowski	RFK Racing	Ford	3
9	12	Ryan Blaney	Team Penske	Ford	2
10	47	Ricky Stenhouse Jr.	Hyak Motorsports	Chevrolet	1

=== Final Stage results ===
Stage Four Laps: 73 (shortened by rain)

Pos	Grid	No	Driver	Team	Manufacturer	Laps	Points
1	14	7	Daniel Suárez	Spire Motorsports	Chevrolet	373	55
2	17	20	Christopher Bell	Joe Gibbs Racing	Toyota	373	50
3	11	11	Denny Hamlin	Joe Gibbs Racing	Toyota	373	60
4	1	45	Tyler Reddick	23XI Racing	Toyota	373	53
5	18	5	Kyle Larson	Hendrick Motorsports	Chevrolet	373	54
6	2	54	Ty Gibbs	Joe Gibbs Racing	Toyota	373	53
7	6	12	Ryan Blaney	Team Penske	Ford	373	41
8	33	22	Joey Logano	Team Penske	Ford	373	29
9	31	24	William Byron	Hendrick Motorsports	Chevrolet	373	28
10	19	38	Zane Smith	Front Row Motorsports	Ford	373	27
11	3	97	Shane van Gisbergen	Trackhouse Racing	Chevrolet	373	33
12	32	47	Ricky Stenhouse Jr.	Hyak Motorsports	Chevrolet	373	29
13	21	43	Erik Jones	Legacy Motor Club	Toyota	373	30
14	4	71	Michael McDowell	Spire Motorsports	Chevrolet	373	23
15	26	6	Brad Keselowski	RFK Racing	Ford	373	25
16	22	41	Cole Custer	Haas Factory Team	Chevrolet	373	21
17	29	48	Alex Bowman	Hendrick Motorsports	Chevrolet	373	20
18	10	16	A. J. Allmendinger	Kaulig Racing	Chevrolet	373	19
19	39	67	Corey Heim (i)	23XI Racing	Toyota	373	0
20	20	34	Todd Gilliland	Front Row Motorsports	Ford	373	17
21	30	35	Riley Herbst	23XI Racing	Toyota	372	16
22	24	23	Bubba Wallace	23XI Racing	Toyota	372	15
23	23	77	Carson Hocevar	Spire Motorsports	Chevrolet	372	14
24	28	4	Noah Gragson	Front Row Motorsports	Ford	372	13
25	35	10	Ty Dillon	Kaulig Racing	Chevrolet	372	12
26	15	42	John Hunter Nemechek	Legacy Motor Club	Toyota	372	11
27	13	33	Austin Hill (i)	Richard Childress Racing	Chevrolet	372	0
28	38	51	Cody Ware	Rick Ware Racing	Chevrolet	371	9
29	34	21	Josh Berry	Wood Brothers Racing	Ford	371	8
30	7	17	Chris Buescher	RFK Racing	Ford	367	10
31	37	78	Katherine Legge	Live Fast Motorsports	Chevrolet	361	6
32	9	3	Austin Dillon	Richard Childress Racing	Chevrolet	338	5
33	12	60	Ryan Preece	RFK Racing	Ford	328	7
34	5	19	Chase Briscoe	Joe Gibbs Racing	Toyota	328	27
35	27	1	Ross Chastain	Trackhouse Racing	Chevrolet	317	2
36	36	66	Timmy Hill (i)	Garage 66	Ford	291	0
37	16	9	Chase Elliott	Hendrick Motorsports	Chevrolet	90	1
38	8	2	Austin Cindric	Team Penske	Ford	52	1
39	25	88	Connor Zilisch (R)	Trackhouse Racing	Chevrolet	52	1
Official race results

=== Race statistics ===
- Lead changes: 32 among 13 different drivers
- Cautions/Laps: 12 for 75 laps
- Red flags: 2 for inclement weather
- Time of race: 4 hours, 39 minutes, and 56 seconds
- Average speed: 119.921 miles per hour (192.994 km/h)

== Media ==
=== Television ===
Prime Video covered the race on the television side. Adam Alexander, Dale Earnhardt Jr. and Steve Letarte called the race from the broadcast booth. Kim Coon, Marty Snider, and Trevor Bayne handled pit road for the television side.

Prime Video
Booth announcers	Pit reporters
Lap-by-lap: Adam Alexander; Color-commentator: Dale Earnhardt Jr. Color-commentator: Steve Letarte	Kim Coon; Marty Snider; Trevor Bayne

=== Radio ===
Radio coverage of the race was broadcast by the Performance Racing Network (PRN), and was also simulcast on Sirius XM NASCAR Radio. Brad Gillie and Alex Hayden called the race in the booth when the field races through the quad-oval. Andrew Kurland called the race from a billboard in turn 2 when the field raced through turns 1 and 2 and halfway down the backstretch. Pat Patterson called the race from a billboard outside of turn 3 when the field raced through the other half of the backstretch and through turns 3 and 4. Wendy Venturini, Brett McMillan, and Alan Cavanna were the pit reporters during the broadcast.

PRN Radio
Booth announcers	Turn announcers	Pit reporters
Lead announcer: Brad Gillie; Announcer: Alex Hayden	Turns 1 & 2: Andrew Kurland; Turns 3 & 4: Pat Patterson	Wendy Venturini; Brett McMillan; Alan Cavanna

== Standings after the race ==
Drivers' Championship standings

	Pos	Driver	Points
	1	Tyler Reddick	620
	2	Denny Hamlin	498 (–122)
1	3	Ryan Blaney	446 (–174)
2	4	Ty Gibbs	425 (–195)
2	5	Chase Elliott	423 (–197)
2	6	Kyle Larson	386 (–234)
2	7	Chris Buescher	385 (–235)
3	8	Christopher Bell	361 (–259)
2	9	Carson Hocevar	356 (–264)
4	10	Daniel Suárez	350 (–270)
2	11	Brad Keselowski	343 (–277)
	12	William Byron	337 (–283)
3	13	Bubba Wallace	328 (–292)
2	14	Shane van Gisbergen	316 (–304)
2	15	Chase Briscoe	304 (–316)
3	16	Ryan Preece	303 (–317)
Official driver's standings

Manufacturers' Championship standings

Pos	Manufacturer	Points
1	Toyota	582
2	Chevrolet	550 (–32)
3	Ford	439 (–143)

- Note: Only the first 16 positions are included for the driver standings.

Previous race: 2026 Go Bowling at The Glen (points); 2026 NASCAR All-Star Race (exhibition)	NASCAR Cup Series; 2026 season	Next race: 2026 Cracker Barrel 400
