= Mike Bagley =

American motorsports commentator (born 1969)

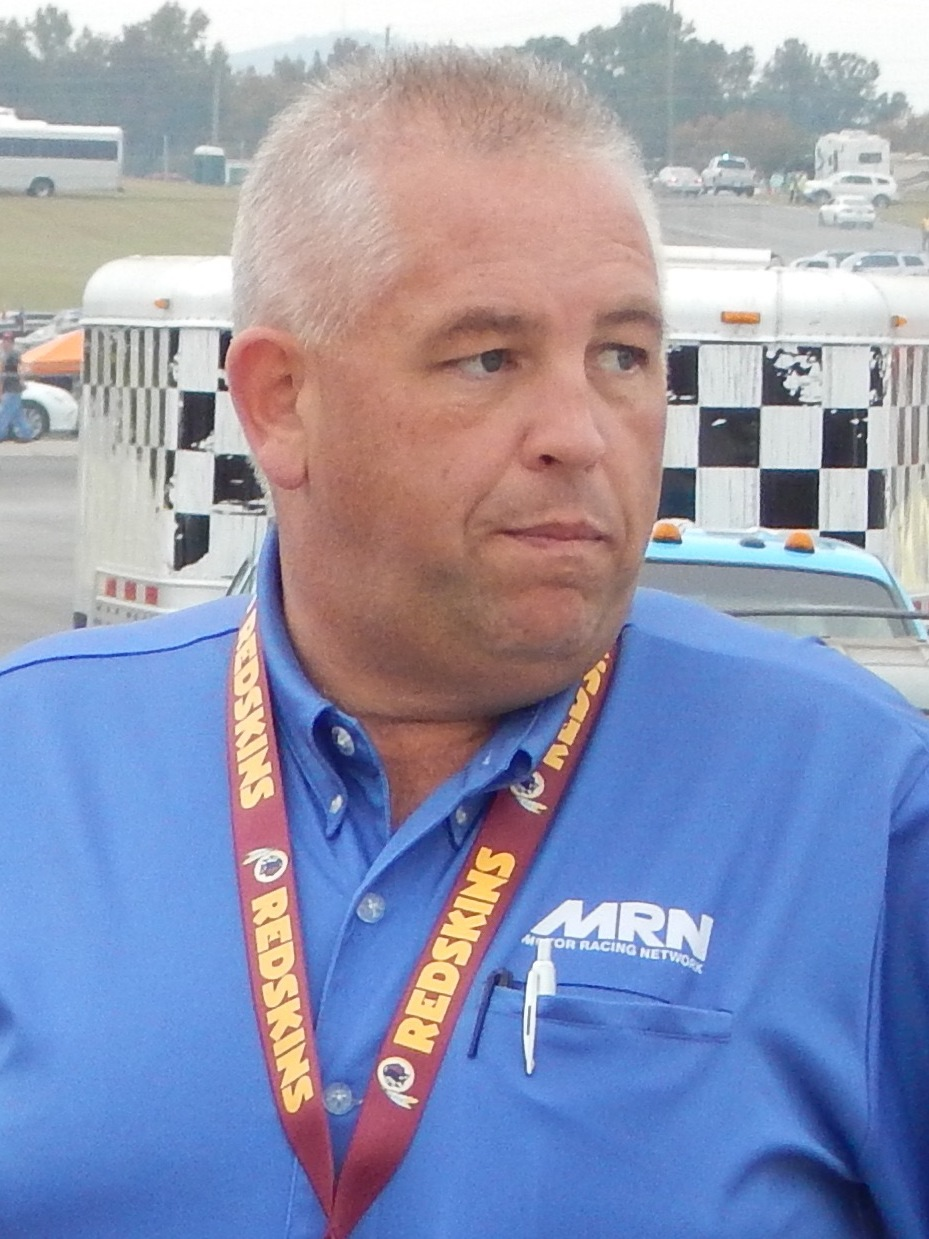
- Bagley in Talladega Superspeedway in 2015

Personal information
- Nickname(s): Bagman; Baggie; Bags
- Nationality: American
- Born: December 29, 1969 (age 55); Salisbury, Maryland
- Occupation(s): NASCAR commentator Turn announcer Radio show host
- Years active: 1992–present
- Employer(s): Motor Racing Network; Sirius XM; NBC Sports
- Updated on December 29, 2015

Michael Bagley is an American motorsports commentator who works for the Motor Racing Network. As of the 2025 season, he is the lead commentator for MRN after serving as a turn announcer from 1998 to 2024. He has worked for the radio network since 1992, becoming a turn announcer in 1998. Since 2008, Bagley has been a co-host of the nationally syndicated Sirius XM show The Morning Drive on Sirius XM NASCAR Radio.

== Early years ==
Born in Salisbury, Maryland, Bagley grew up listening to NASCAR races on MRN radio and developed a fascination with the race lap-by-lap calls, "so much so that I used to have a box of Matchbox cars. We had a shag rug in the den and every Sunday I'd plug the radio in, set it on the floor and mat down the rug in the shape of whatever track they were racing at. I would move my Matchbox cars around that makeshift track listening to Barney Hall, Eli Gold, Mike Joy, Jerry Punch, and Ned Jarrett; and became fascinated with NASCAR. At the same time, I also became fascinated with radio. I used to hang out at a local station and watch the DJ behind the booth."

== Motor Racing Network ==
=== Beginning ===
After receiving a letter from then-General Manager of MRN John McMullen, Bagley began running boxes of cables to their respective turn positions at Dover International Speedway. In 1992, he worked his first race as a turn announcer for an Xfinity Series race at Watkins Glen International. "I got a call one day to work the Fay's 150 at Watkins Glen in 1992. I worked the '90' (Turn 1) that day and I thought that was an awful performance. But obviously, the powers that be heard something they liked and the rest is history. Here I am almost 23 years later to the day."

=== Role ===
Since 2025, Bagley serves as a lead booth broadcaster for the three national series with Alex Hayden and Rusty Wallace at MRN Radio. Prior to the 2024 season, he served as secondary turn announcer for MRN. He works turns 3 & 4 at most tracks, the backstretch at Richmond Raceway, turn 2 at Pocono Raceway, and the backstretch at both Daytona International Speedway and Talladega Superspeedway. Bagley is normally the host of pre-race coverage before races most weekends.

== Sirius XM ==
Since 2008, Bagley has been a co-host of the Sirius XM show The Morning Drive on Sirius XM NASCAR Radio. He originally worked the show with David Poole until Poole suffered a fatal heart attack on April 26, 2009. After rotating hosts for the next two and a half months, he began doing the show with MRN colleague Pete Pistone on July 6. The two men do the show from different locations with Bagley in (Chesapeake bay studios) Annapolis, Maryland and Pistone in Chicago.

Unlike his other MRN colleagues Dave Moody and Pistone, Bagley is known for being eccentric, over the top and being into electronic dance music. Being a self-described "history buff," a hallmark of The Morning Drive is a short – usually ten-minute – segment called "The Calendar" in which he describes what events are associated with the day in question, such as holidays. He also runs down a list of historical events that happened on "this day" in past years and people who were born on the day in question from outside the world of NASCAR as well as those in the world of NASCAR.

== NBC Sports ==
Since 2017, NBC Sports has hired Bagley to assist in selected races at longer circuits. In 2017-19 and again in 2021, Bagley was assigned to the "S"s at Watkins Glen International, and was expanded to the Pocono Raceway and Indianapolis Motor Speedway weekend, assigned to Turn 2 as part of NBC's radio-style coverage plans.
