= Dave Moody (sportscaster) =

American motorsports commentator

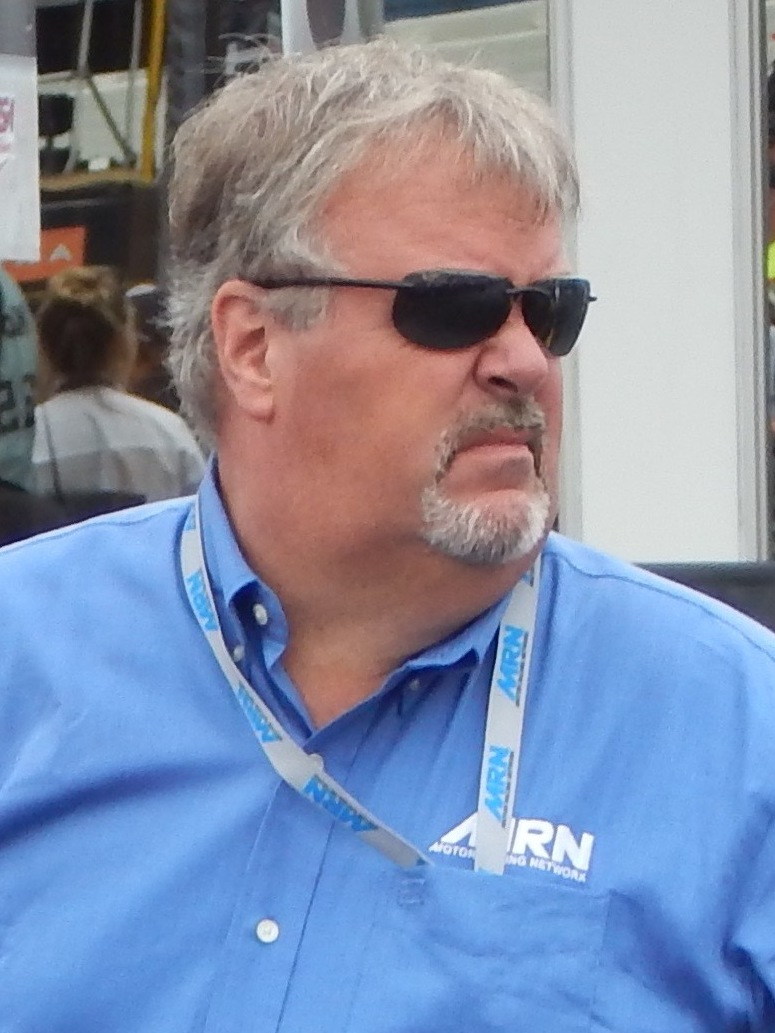
- Moody at Talladega Superspeedway in 2015

Personal information
- Full name: David Wayne Moody
- Nickname: The Godfather
- Nationality: (United States) American
- Born: March 25, 1961 (age 65) Barre City, Vermont, U.S.
- Occupations: Journalist; NASCAR commentator Turn announcer Radio show host
- Years active: 1983-present
- Employers: Motor Racing Network; Sirius XM
- Other interests: Boston Red Sox; New England Patriots; Carolina Panthers; Boston Celtics; Boston Bruins
- Updated on December 13, 2015

David Wayne Moody (born March 25, 1961) is an American motorsports commentator who works for the Motor Racing Network (MRN). He is the lead turn announcer for MRN and has worked for the radio network on and off since 1983. He moved to MRN full-time in 1997 and became the lead turn announcer in 2001. Since 2003, Moody has been the host of the radio show SiriusXM Speedway on SiriusXM NASCAR Radio.

== Early years ==
Born in Barre City, Vermont, Moody discovered auto racing when his uncle, Doug MacDonald, took him to the local Thunder Road Speedbowl. The track was owned by MRN co-founder Ken Squier. After being hired by CBS Sports to serve as their NASCAR anchorman, Squier selected Moody to replace him as the track's public address announcer. "I still don’t know how he picked me," said Moody. "He may have read some of my newspaper columns and thought I had a workable vocabulary. More likely, I was just standing there with my finger in my nose and he figured, 'this is a kid with time on his hands.'" David used to announce for high school basketball, hockey, and football games from the time he was young.

== Motor Racing Network ==
=== Beginning ===
With Squier's endorsement, Moody debuted for MRN in the 1983 Daytona 500 as a garage reporter. "I think it was one of the only Daytona 500s in history where nobody blew up, nobody crashed and nobody even spun," he recalled. "I sat down there all day long, praying for someone to talk to. I eventually got a couple minutes of airtime, but that was about it." Moody worked as a turn announcer for the first time in 1987, during the Gatorade 125's at Daytona International Speedway. Later, he called Darrell Waltrip through Turns three and four, en route to Victory Lane in the Daytona 500.

=== Present ===
Moody worked part-time for MRN until 1997, when he was hired to work weekly as a turn announcer. He took over the lead turn announcer's position in 2001, when Joe Moore moved to the anchor booth when Allen Bestwick transitioned to television with NBC. Moody has also worked in the anchor booth on occasion with Moore, replacing veteran Barney Hall.

=== Role ===
Moody is the lead turn announcer for MRN, calling the first and second turns for the network's broadcasts of NASCAR Cup Series, Xfinity Series, and Craftsman Truck Series race events. He is known for his high-energy, play-by-play commentary and his distinctive call, "Trouble in Turn Two!" Moody does not work the west coast races he is usually replaced on those race broadcasts by California native Dan Hubbard. Moody also serves as a turn announcer for select Oreilly and Craftsman Truck Series companion events.

== SiriusXM ==
Since 2003, Moody has hosted the nationally syndicated Sirius XM show Sirius XM Speedway on Sirius XM NASCAR Radio. "Our first show was the day after Matt Kenseth won the championship. You couldn’t have picked a worse time to start a racing show. It was the end of the season. All of the drivers were either on an island or a boat somewhere. The race fans didn’t know we existed. We were brand new, and in the middle of a stick-and-ball sports channel. We would come on, do our three hours and lead into "World Soccer Daily." There was zero listener transfer from our show to the next. Somehow, we made a go of it and soldiered on. It's been 11 years, now, and it doesn’t seem possible."

Moody has had a pair of "sidekicks" over the years, beginning with Suzy Q. Armstrong (wife of former MRN turn announcer Fred Armstrong) from the show's 2003 debut until 2011, when she left to pursue other projects. For the next four years, he co-hosted the show with Angie Skinner, wife of former Cup Series driver Mike Skinner. When Skinner left to co-host her own weekend show, Skinner Round-Up, Moody continued as sole anchor. In January 2015. Armstrong returned to the channel to deliver news updates at the bottom of the hour.

Moody is known for his no-nonsense style of hosting, humor and outspoken opinions. He's a vocal advocate of free speech because "it puts the ‘talk’ in ‘talk radio.’" However, when callers go off the beaten path, he's known to fight back and straighten those callers out. Moody and many of his callers state that the occasional back and forth is where the show is at its best. “If everybody on the air agreed with everybody else, it would just be stultifyingly dull,” he said. “Rush Limbaugh makes a billion dollars for every penny I make, so he must be doing something right. The only people that get on the air to talk to Rush Limbaugh are people that agree with Rush Limbaugh. It’s always, ‘Mega dittos, Rush. I agree with everything you’ve ever said in your life! [And Rush says] Well, of course you do because I’m the smartest’ – and that’s great, he’s doing a wonderful job and he’s very successful. I couldn’t do that. I’ve never learned anything from talking. I learn from listening. So I want to hear what people have to say.” He is joined by SXM Producer Dan Bezilla and associate producer Margeaux Gagnon.

He is the Sirius XM voting representative on the 48 person panel that selects the annual class of the NASCAR Hall of Fame.
