= List of NASCAR All-Star Race drivers =

The NASCAR All-Star Race is an annual non-points exhibition stock car race that is held as part of the NASCAR Cup Series season. A total of 115 drivers have competed in the race that has been held at Charlotte Motor Speedway (1985, 1987–2019), Atlanta Motor Speedway (1986), Bristol Motor Speedway (2020), Texas Motor Speedway (2021-2022), and North Wilkesboro Speedway (2023-Present). In gold the drivers who won the NASCAR Cup Series championship.

Driver	Debut	Races	Wins	Pole	Best	Top 5	Top 10
Darrell Waltrip	1985	16	1 (1985)	2	1 (1985)	4	8
Harry Gant	1985	10	0	0	2 (1985)	2	4
Terry Labonte	1985	20	2 (1988, 1999)	2	1 (1988, 1999)	6	9
Cale Yarborough	1985	4	0	0	4 (1985)	2	2
Tim Richmond	1985	2	0	0	3 (1987)	2	2
Bobby Allison	1985	3	0	0	5 (1988)	1	3
Bill Elliott	1985	18	1 (1986)	5	1 (1986)	6	13
Ricky Rudd	1985	17	0	0	3 (1995)	3	8
Benny Parsons	1985	2	0	0	9 (1985)	0	2
Dale Earnhardt	1985	16	3 (1987, 1990, 1993)	1	1 (1987, 1990, 1993)	9	12
Richard Petty	1985	4	0	0	9 (1992)	0	1
Geoffrey Bodine	1985	15	1 (1994)	0	1 (1994)	4	8
Neil Bonnett	1986	4	0	0	6 (1986)	0	2
Greg Sacks	1986	5	0	0	10 (1986, 1989)	0	2
Rusty Wallace	1987	19	1 (1989)	3	1 (1989)	5	10
Kyle Petty	1987	11	0	0	2 (1992)	1	4
Morgan Shepherd	1987	8	0	0	7 (1987)	0	4
Davey Allison	1987	7	2 (1991, 1992)	2	1 (1991, 1992)	4	5
Bobby Hillin Jr.	1987	5	0	0	10 (1990)	0	1
Buddy Baker	1987	1	0	0	18 (1987)	0	0
Sterling Marlin	1988	13	0	0	2 (1988, 1994, 1995)	3	8
Lake Speed	1988	6	0	0	11 (1988, 1990)	0	0
Phil Parsons	1988	3	0	0	16 (1988)	0	0
Ken Schrader	1989	8	0	0	2 (1989, 1990, 1991)	6	6
Alan Kulwicki	1989	4	0	0	5 (1989)	1	3
Mark Martin	1990	24	2 (1998, 2005)	0	1 (1998, 2005)	6	10
Dick Trickle	1990	1	0	0	6 (1990)	0	1
Derrike Cope	1990	2	0	0	18 (1990, 1991)	0	0
Brett Bodine	1990	4	0	0	10 (1993, 1995)	0	2
Ernie Irvan	1991	8	0	1	3 (1993)	2	4
Michael Waltrip	1991	14	1 (1996)	0	1 (1996)	3	5
Hut Stricklin	1991	3	0	0	8 (1991)	0	1
Tommy Ellis	1991	1	0	0	14 (1991)	0	0
Kenny Wallace	1991	2	0	0	16 (2007)	0	0
Dave Mader III	1992	1	0	0	16 (1992)	0	0
Dale Jarrett	1992	17	0	0	2 (2000, 2001)	3	8
Rick Mast	1993	1	0	0	11(1993)	0	0
Jimmy Hensley	1993	1	0	0	17 (1993)	0	0
Jeff Burton	1994	12	0	0	4 (1998)	3	5
Ward Burton	1994	8	0	0	6 (2001)	0	3
Joe Nemechek	1994	6	0	0	4 (2003)	1	2
Jeff Gordon	1994	22	3 (1995, 1997, 2001)	1	1 (1995, 1997, 2001)	7	10
Robert Pressley	1995	1	0	0	7 (1995)	0	1
Mike Wallace	1995	2	0	0	8 (1995)	0	1
Jimmy Spencer	1995	3	0	0	5 (1997)	1	2
Elton Sawyer	1995	1	0	0	12 (1995)	0	0
Bobby Labonte	1995	17	0	2	2 (1997, 1998)	4	8
Todd Bodine	1995	2	0	0	8 (2001)	0	1
Ricky Craven	1997	4	0	0	8 (1997)	0	3
Bobby Hamilton	1997	5	0	0	9 (1998)	0	2
Rich Bickle	1998	1	0	0	10 (1998)	0	1
Kenny Irwin Jr.	1998	2	0	0	12 (2000)	0	0
Jeremy Mayfield	1998	7	0	0	5 (1999)	1	2
John Andretti	1998	3	0	0	10 (1999)	0	1
Tony Stewart	1999	18	1 (2009)	0	1 (2009)	8	9
Dale Earnhardt Jr.	2000	18	1 (2000)	0	1 (2000)	6	14
Jerry Nadeau	2000	2	0	0	4 (2000)	2	2
Steve Park	2000	3	0	0	13 (2000)	0	0
Johnny Benson Jr.	2001	2	0	0	9 (2001)	0	1
Matt Kenseth	2001	19	1 (2004)	3	1 (2004)	7	12
Elliott Sadler	2001	5	0	0	2 (2005)	1	2
Kevin Harvick	2001	23	2 (2007, 2018)	1	2 (2007, 2018)	5	11
Ryan Newman	2002	20	1 (2002)	1	1 (2002)	3	7
Kurt Busch	2002	21	1 (2010)	1	1 (2010)	8	11
Jimmie Johnson	2002	19	4 (2003, 2006, 2012, 2013)	1	1 (2003, 2006, 2012, 2013)	9	11
Robby Gordon	2002	2	0	0	7 (2002)	0	1
Jamie McMurray	2003	12	1 (2014)	0	1 (2014)	2	4
Kasey Kahne	2004	15	1 (2008)	1	1 (2008)	2	6
Brian Vickers	2004	4	0	0	3 (2005)	1	2
Greg Biffle	2004	13	0	0	2 (2008)	2	4
Carl Edwards	2005	11	1 (2011)	2	1 (2011)	5	7
Martin Truex Jr.	2005	14	0	1	2 (2010)	1	4
Scott Riggs	2006	1	0	0	10 (2006)	0	1
Kyle Busch	2006	19	1 (2017)	4	1 (2017)	6	12
Johnny Sauter	2007	1	0	0	6 (2007)	0	1
Denny Hamlin	2007	18	1 (2015)	1	1 (2015)	7	12
Casey Mears	2007	3	0	0	13 (2008)	0	0
Sam Hornish Jr.	2008	2	0	0	7 (2008)	0	1
Juan Pablo Montoya	2008	2	0	0	12 (2011)	0	0
A. J. Allmendinger	2008	7	0	0	7 (2022)	0	2
Clint Bowyer	2008	11	0	1	7 (2014)	0	1
Joey Logano	2009	14	2 (2016, 2024)	1	1 (2016, 2024)	8	13
Brad Keselowski	2009	16	0	0	2 (2012, 2016, 2021)	4	9
David Reutimann	2010	2	0	0	3 (2011)	1	1
David Ragan	2011	4	0	0	8 (2011)	0	1
Regan Smith	2011	2	0	0	12 (2011)	0	0
Marcos Ambrose	2012	2	0	0	7 (2012)	0	1
Trevor Bayne	2012	2	0	0	7 (2016)	0	1
Paul Menard	2012	1	0	0	16 (2012)	0	0
Ricky Stenhouse Jr.	2013	6	0	0	11 (2018)	0	0
Danica Patrick	2013	3	0	0	15 (2016)	0	0
Josh Wise	2014	1	0	0	15 (2014)	0	0
Aric Almirola	2015	5	0	0	6 (2019)	0	3
Chase Elliott	2016	9	1 (2020)	0	1 (2020)	4	7
Kyle Larson	2016	8	2 (2019, 2021, 2023)	3	1 (2019, 2021, 2023)	5	6
Ryan Blaney	2017	8	1 (2022)	0	1 (2022)	3	5
Daniel Suárez	2017	5	0	1	2 (2018)	2	3
Chris Buescher	2017	4	0	0	3 (2024)	1	2
Austin Dillon	2018	4	0	0	7 (2019)	0	1
Alex Bowman	2018	5	0	0	6 (2021, 2022)	0	4
Bubba Wallace	2019	4	0	0	2 (2023)	2	3
William Byron	2019	6	0	0	7 (2021)	0	2
Erik Jones	2019	4	0	0	8 (2023)	0	1
Matt DiBenedetto	2020	2	0	0	13 (2020)	0	0
Justin Haley	2020	1	0	0	14 (2020)	0	0
Cole Custer	2020	2	0	0	14 (2021)	0	0
Christopher Bell	2021	4	0	0	10 (2022)	0	1
Ross Chastain	2021	4	0	0	7 (2024)	0	1
Michael McDowell	2021	3	0	0	9 (2024)	0	1
Tyler Reddick	2021	3	0	0	3 (2023)	1	1
Austin Cindric	2022	2	0	0	3 (2022)	1	1
Chase Briscoe	2022	2	0	0	4 (2023)	1	1
Ty Gibbs	2023	2	0	0	9 (2023)	0	1
Josh Berry	2023	1	0	0	15 (2023)	0	0
Noah Gragson	2023	2	0	0	11 (2024)	0	0
