= 2012 NASCAR Sprint All-Star Race =

28th iteration of the NASCAR All-Star Race

- Race details
Date	May 19, 2012
Location	Charlotte Motor Speedway in Concord, North Carolina
Course	Permanent racing facility 1.5 mi (2.4 km)
Distance	Showdown: 40 laps, 60 mi (96.56 km); All-Star Race: 90 laps, 135 mi (217.26 km)
Avg Speed	Showdown: 125.581 miles per hour (202.103 km/h); All-Star Race: 92.045 miles per hour (148.132 km/h)
- Sprint Showdown
Pole position	A. J. Allmendinger (Penske Racing); 28.057 seconds
Winner	Dale Earnhardt Jr. (Hendrick Motorsports)
- Sprint All-Star Race
Pole position	Kyle Busch (Joe Gibbs Racing); 119.112 seconds
Showdown transfers	Dale Earnhardt Jr. (Showdown winner); A. J. Allmendinger (Showdown runner-up); Bobby Labonte (Fan vote)
Most laps led	Brad Keselowski (Penske Racing); 20 laps
Winner	Jimmie Johnson (Hendrick Motorsports)
- Television
Network	Speed
Announcers	Mike Joy, Darrell Waltrip and Michael Waltrip

The 2012 NASCAR Sprint All-Star Race was a NASCAR Sprint Cup Series race held on May 19, 2012, at Charlotte Motor Speedway in Concord, North Carolina. Contested over 90 laps, the it was the second exhibition race of the 2012 Sprint Cup Series season. Jimmie Johnson of Hendrick Motorsports took his third All-Star Race victory, while Brad Keselowski finished second and Matt Kenseth finished third.

== Report ==
=== Background ===
Charlotte Motor Speedway, where the race was held.

Charlotte Motor Speedway is one of ten intermediate to hold NASCAR races. The standard track at Charlotte Motor Speedway is a four-turn quad-oval track that is 1.5 miles (2.4 km) long. The track's turns are banked at twenty-four degrees, while the front stretch, the location of the finish line, is five degrees. The back stretch, opposite of the front, also had a five degree banking.

A total of 22 drivers were entered for the Sprint Showdown, while 21 different drivers were eligible to participate in the All-Star Race, including race winners from last season through the Southern 500 at Darlington Raceway and previous All-Star race winners from the past 10 years. The drivers who finish first and second in the Sprint Showdown, a 40-lap preliminary race, was also eligible to compete in the race, as well as the Sprint fan vote winner. The race was 90 laps long, separated into five segments: four segments of 20 laps and a final segment of 10 laps. A mandatory pit stop was between the final two segments, while pitting between the 20 lap segments was optional. Each segment winner moved to the front of the grid before the pit stops, but drivers lined-up for the restart how they left pit road. Since the inaugural race in 1985, the format has changed eight times.

=== Pit crew challenge ===
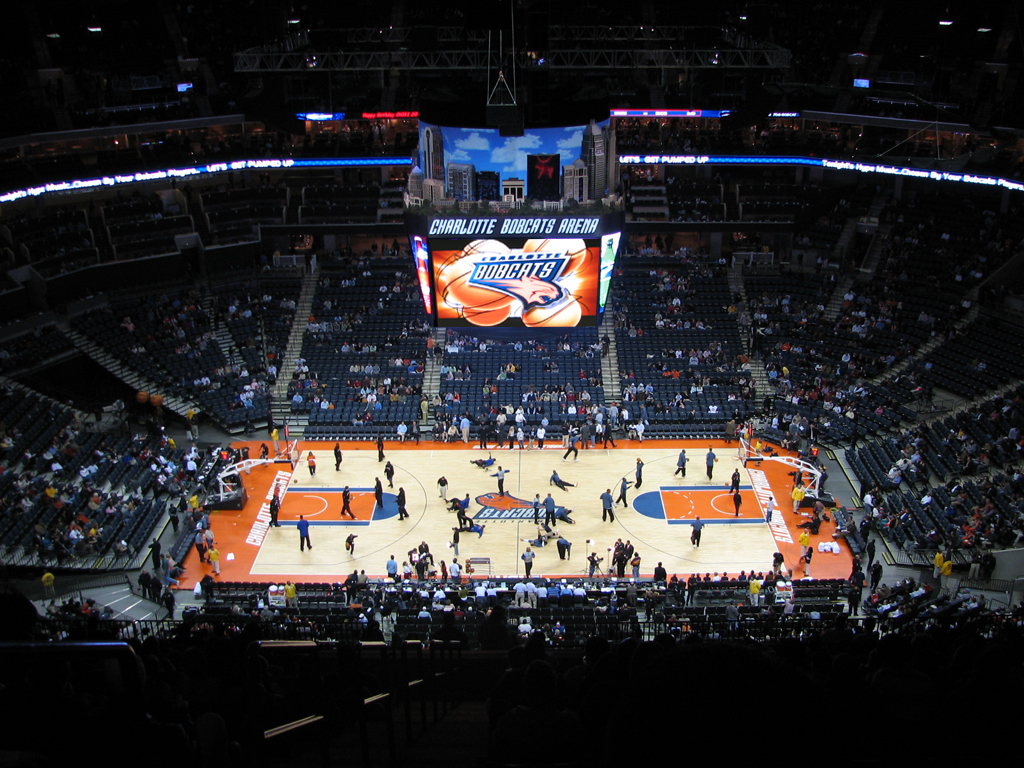
Time Warner Cable Arena (shown during a basketball game) is where the Sprint Pit Crew Challenge was held.

The top-24 pit crews chose their pit stall by how they finished in the Sprint Pit Crew Challenge on May 17, 2012. The winner of the event was the No. 48 team from Hendrick Motorsports, which is driven on track by Jimmie Johnson. They beat the No. 11 team from Joe Gibbs Racing, driven on track by Denny Hamlin, by 0.294 seconds. Following the challenge, Johnson stated, "In this discipline, the athleticism and training really pays off. We made a big effort to get full-fledged athletes who did nothing but work on their pit stops and disciplines. And then they focused on this — the distance to run, the car push and all that — and I think it just shows how strong they are, how physically able they are to get the job done."

In addition, the event had individual winners who were the best in each category: jack man, gas man, front tire changers, and rear tire changers with the addition of two tire carriers. The jack man competition was won by Jeff Keer, from Kasey Kahne's Hendrick Motorsports' No. 5 team, while the gas man competition was won by Tom Lampe, who was from Kyle Busch's Joe Gibbs Racing No. 18 team. Jeff Burton's Richard Childress Racing No. 31 team's front tire changer, Tim Sheets, and tire carrier JD Holcomb, who performed a record time of 13.615 seconds. The rear tire changer and tire carrier competition was won be Jake Seminara and Kenny Barber from the No. 18 Joe Gibbs Racing team.

=== Practice and qualifying ===
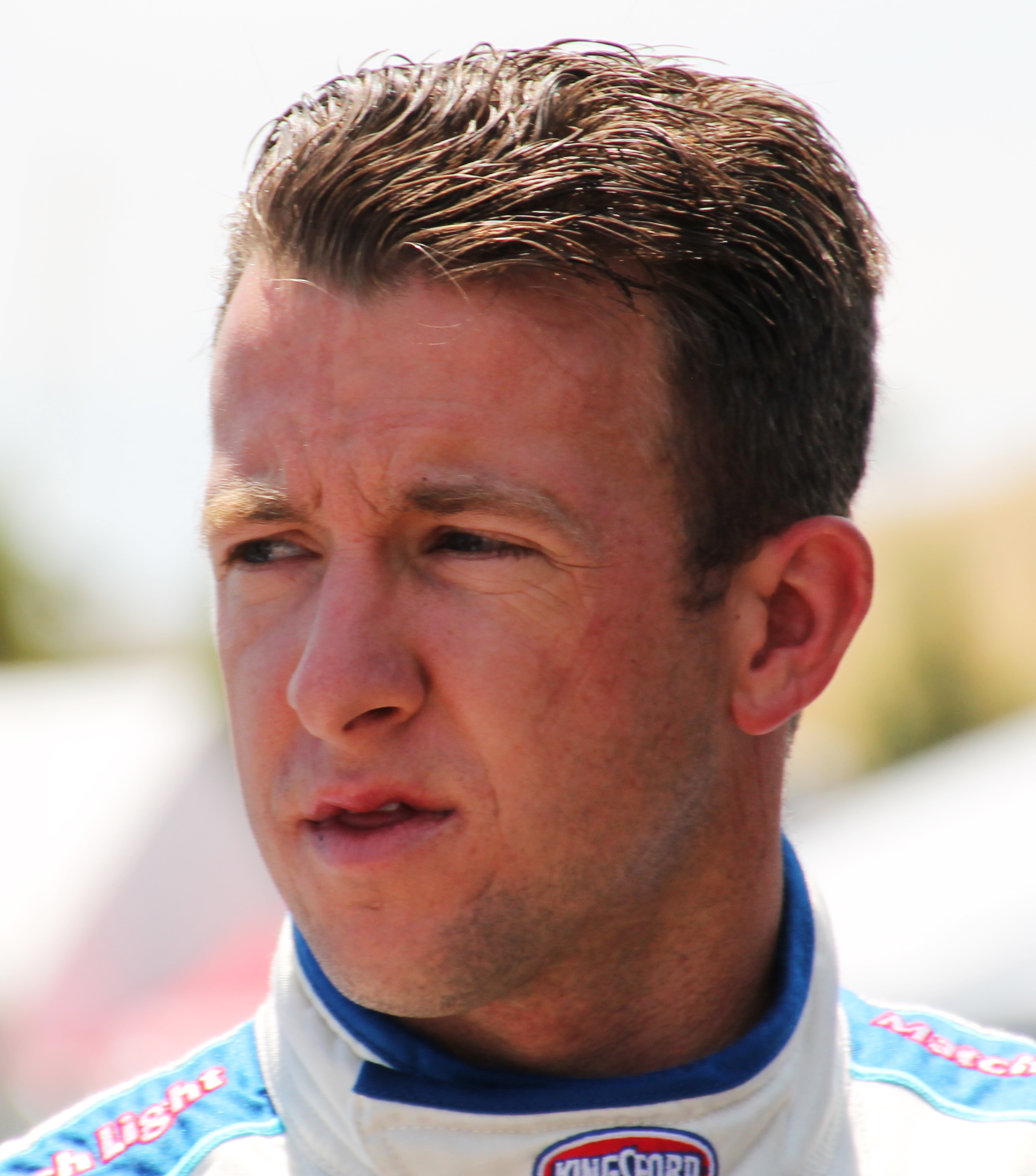
A. J. Allmendinger (pictured in 2015) won the preliminary race's pole position after posting a time of 28.706 seconds.

Two practice sessions were held on May 18, 2012; one for both the Sprint Showdown and the other for the All-Star Race. The Sprint Showdown practice was 85 minutes, while the All-Star Race practice session lasted 145 minutes. Qualifying for both events were held following the practice sessions.

During the Sprint Showdown practice session, Dale Earnhardt Jr. was quickest with a time of 28.706 seconds, eight one-thousandths of a second faster than A. J. Allmendinger in the second position. Landon Cassill followed in third, ahead of Bobby Labonte, Martin Truex Jr. and Burton. Casey Mears was scored seventh fastest, while Aric Almirola, Travis Kvapil and Juan Pablo Montoya completed the first ten positions. Kyle Busch was quickest in the All-Star Race practice session with a time of 28.672.

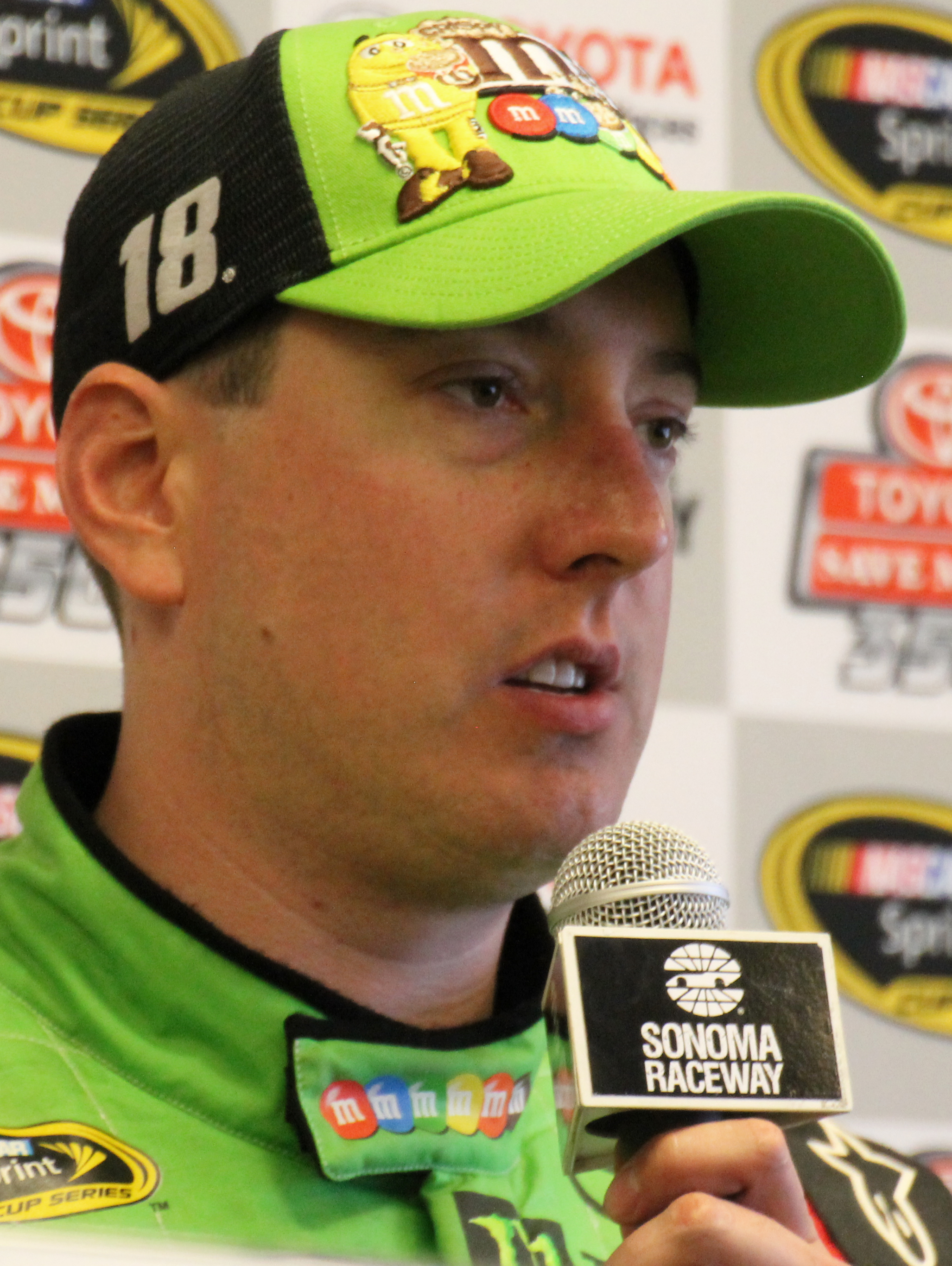
Kyle Busch (pictured in 2015) won the Sprint All-Star Race pole position with a time of 1:59.112.

Greg Biffle followed Kyle Busch in the second position by 0.095 seconds. Marcos Ambrose was third quickest, ahead of Carl Edwards, Kevin Harvick and Brad Keselowski. Mark Martin was scored seventh fastest with a time of 28.986, 0.314 behind Kyle Busch. Matt Kenseth, Paul Menard and Kurt Busch completed the first ten drivers in the session.

Allmendinger clinched the Sprint Showdown pole position a time of 28.057 seconds. Truex Jr. qualified 0.208 seconds behind and will Allmendinger on the front row of the grid. Earnhardt Jr. took third place, ahead of Burton and Almirola in the fourth and fifth positions. Cassill qualified sixth, while Montoya followed in seventh. Labonte, Kvapil and David Stremme completed the first ten positions.

Unlike the two-lap qualifying sessions in the season, the Sprint All-Star Race qualifying session consists of three laps and four-tire pit stop, which is during the second lap. Kyle Busch won the pole position for the All-Star Race with a time of 1:59.112 for the three laps with pit stop. Ryan Newman qualified second, ahead of Hamlin, Biffle, and Harvick. Johnson, with a time of 2:01.076, was seventh quickest, less than one-tenth of a second quicker than Menard in eighth. Jeff Gordon, Tony Stewart and Regan Smith completed the first ten positions of the grid. Also in the All-Star Race qualifying session, Kasey Kahne collided into the fourth turn wall while trying to finish his qualifying attempt, forcing him to change to a back-up car. "We unloaded with a really fast race car [Friday]," Busch commented after the session, "The guys made some minor changes to it to kind of feel it out and make it better where we could. The guys did a great job there with the pit stop, coming down pit road and changing four [tires] and then getting back out there and coming back to the line pretty quick."

=== Sprint Showdown ===
A. J. Allmendinger won the pole for the Sprint Showdown, but would have to go to pit road during the pace laps to change a flat tire. Dale Earnhardt Jr. dominated the showdown leading every lap to cruise to victory. A.J Allmendinger would finish second in the final transfer spot after a hard battle with Jamie McMurray.

=== NASCAR Sprint All-Star Race ===
The 2012 NASCAR Sprint All-Star race was the second exhibition race of the season, and was televised live in the United States on Speed, which began at 7:30 p.m. local time. Joe Gibbs, owner of Joe Gibbs Racing, began pre-race ceremonies with an invocation. Singer Tony Lucca, finalist on the singing talent show The Voice, performed the national anthem, and Sprint customer Travis Rosia commanded the drivers to start their engines.

== Results ==
=== Showdown and All-Star Race qualifying ===
Showdown qualifying							All-Star Race qualifying					
Grid	No.	Driver	Team	Manufacturer	Time	Speed	Grid	No.	Driver	Team	Manufacturer	Time
1	22	A. J. Allmendinger	Penske Racing	Dodge	28.057	192.465	1	18	Kyle Busch	Joe Gibbs Racing	Toyota	1:59.112
2	56	Martin Truex Jr.	Michael Waltrip Racing	Toyota	28.265	191.049	2	39	Ryan Newman	Stewart–Haas Racing	Chevrolet	1:59.821
3	88	Dale Earnhardt Jr.	Hendrick Motorsports	Chevrolet	28.272	191.002	3	11	Denny Hamlin	Joe Gibbs Racing	Toyota	2:00.168
4	31	Jeff Burton	Richard Childress Racing	Chevrolet	28.467	189.693	4	16	Greg Biffle	Roush Fenway Racing	Ford	2:00.420
5	43	Aric Almirola	Richard Petty Motorsports	Ford	28.609	188.752	5	29	Kevin Harvick	Richard Childress Racing	Chevrolet	2:00.622
6	83	Landon Cassill	BK Racing	Toyota	28.620	188.679	6	48	Jimmie Johnson	Hendrick Motorsports	Chevrolet	2:01.076
7	42	Juan Pablo Montoya	Earnhardt Ganassi Racing	Chevrolet	28.622	188.666	7	27	Paul Menard	Richard Childress Racing	Chevrolet	2:01.147
8	47	Bobby Labonte	JTG Daugherty Racing	Toyota	28.667	188.370	8	24	Jeff Gordon	Hendrick Motorsports	Chevrolet	2:01.297
9	93	Travis Kvapil	BK Racing	Toyota	28.727	187.976	9	14	Tony Stewart	Stewart–Haas Racing	Chevrolet	2:01.482
10	30	David Stremme	Inception Motorsports	Toyota	28.753	187.806	10	78	Regan Smith	Furniture Row Racing	Chevrolet	2:01.721
11	13	Casey Mears	Germain Racing	Toyota	28.762	187.748	11	21	Trevor Bayne	Wood Brothers Racing	Ford	2:01.861
12	10	David Reutimann	Tommy Baldwin Racing	Chevrolet	28.778	187.643	12	15	Clint Bowyer	Michael Waltrip Racing	Toyota	2:02.292
13	20	Joey Logano	Joe Gibbs Racing	Toyota	28.788	187.578	13	99	Carl Edwards	Roush Fenway Racing	Ford	2:02.420
14	33	Stephen Leicht	Joe Falk	Chevrolet	28.922	186.709	14	34	David Ragan	Front Row Motorsports	Ford	2:04.183
15	95	Scott Speed	Leavine Family Racing	Ford	28.927	186.677	15	17	Matt Kenseth	Roush Fenway Racing	Ford	2:05.351
16	38	David Gilliland	Front Row Motorsports	Ford	28.928	186.670	16	55	Mark Martin	Michael Waltrip Racing	Toyota	2:06.624
17	19	Mike Bliss	Humphrey Smith Racing	Toyota	28.955	186.496	17	51	Kurt Busch	Phoenix Racing	Chevrolet	2:08.074
18	49	J. J. Yeley	America Israel Racing	Toyota	29.025	186.047	18	9	Marcos Ambrose	Richard Petty Motorsports	Ford	2:08.784
19	1	Jamie McMurray	Earnhardt Ganassi Racing	Chevrolet	29.047	185.906	19	2	Brad Keselowski	Penske Racing	Dodge	2:10.436
20	87	Joe Nemechek	NEMCO Motorsports	Toyota	29.081	185.688	20	5	Kasey Kahne	Hendrick Motorsports	Chevrolet	No Time
21	26	Josh Wise	Front Row Motorsports	Ford	29.188	185.008	21					
22	36	Tony Raines	Tommy Baldwin Racing	Chevrolet	29.578	182.568	22					
Source:								Source:				

=== Showdown results ===
Showdown race results						All-Star Race results					
Pos	Car	Driver	Team	Manufacturer	Laps Run	Pos	Car	Driver	Team	Manufacturer	Laps Run
1	88	Dale Earnhardt Jr.	Hendrick Motorsports	Chevrolet	40	1	48	Jimmie Johnson	Hendrick Motorsports	Chevrolet	90
2	22	A. J. Allmendinger	Penske Racing	Dodge	40	2	2	Brad Keselowski	Penske Racing	Dodge	90
3	1	Jamie McMurray	Earnhardt Ganassi Racing	Chevrolet	40	3	17	Matt Kenseth	Roush Fenway Racing	Ford	90
4	56	Martin Truex Jr.	Michael Waltrip Racing	Toyota	40	4	18	Kyle Busch	Joe Gibbs Racing	Toyota	90
5	42	Juan Pablo Montoya	Earnhardt Ganassi Racing	Chevrolet	40	5	88	Dale Earnhardt Jr.	Hendrick Motorsports	Chevrolet	90
6	20	Joey Logano	Joe Gibbs Racing	Toyota	40	6	29	Kevin Harvick	Richard Childress Racing	Chevrolet	90
7	43	Aric Almirola	Richard Petty Motorsports	Ford	40	7	9	Marcos Ambrose	Richard Petty Motorsports	Ford	90
8	31	Jeff Burton	Richard Childress Racing	Chevrolet	40	8	51	Kurt Busch	Phoenix Racing	Chevrolet	90
9	83	Landon Cassill	BK Racing	Toyota	40	9	5	Kasey Kahne	Hendrick Motorsports	Chevrolet	90
10	93	Travis Kvapil	BK Racing	Toyota	40	10	39	Ryan Newman	Stewart–Haas Racing	Chevrolet	90
11	13	Casey Mears	Germain Racing	Toyota	40	11	22	A. J. Allmendinger	Penske Racing	Dodge	90
12	47	Bobby Labonte	JTG Daugherty Racing	Toyota	40	12	78	Regan Smith	Furniture Row Racing	Chevrolet	90
13	26	Josh Wise	Front Row Motorsports	Ford	40	13	24	Jeff Gordon	Hendrick Motorsports	Chevrolet	90
14	95	Scott Speed	Leavine Family Racing	Ford	40	14	15	Clint Bowyer	Michael Waltrip Racing	Toyota	90
15	38	David Gilliland	Front Row Motorsports	Ford	40	15	21	Trevor Bayne	Wood Brothers Racing	Ford	90
16	19	Mike Bliss	Humphrey Smith Racing	Toyota	28	16	27	Paul Menard	Richard Childress Racing	Chevrolet	90
17	87	Joe Nemechek	NEMCO Motorsports	Toyota	26	17	14	Tony Stewart	Stewart–Haas Racing	Chevrolet	90
18	30	David Stremme	Inception Motorsports	Toyota	22	18	34	David Ragan	Front Row Motorsports	Ford	90
19	10	David Reutimann	Tommy Baldwin Racing	Chevrolet	20	19	47	Bobby Labonte	JTG Daugherty Racing	Toyota	90
20	36	Tony Raines	Tommy Baldwin Racing	Chevrolet	20	20	11	Denny Hamlin	Joe Gibbs Racing	Toyota	90
21	33	Stephen Leicht	Joe Falk	Chevrolet	7	21	55	Mark Martin	Michael Waltrip Racing	Toyota	90
22	49	J. J. Yeley	America Israel Racing	Toyota	3	22	16	Greg Biffle	Roush Fenway Racing	Ford	67
23						23	99	Carl Edwards	Roush Fenway Racing	Ford	25
Source:						Source:					
