= 1995 The Winston Select =

Tenth iteration of the NASCAR All-Star Race

Race details
- Race 2 of 2 exhibition races in the 1995 NASCAR Winston Cup Series
- Date: May 20, 1995
- Location: Concord, North Carolina
- Course: Charlotte Motor Speedway
- Course length: 1.5 miles (2.4 km)
- Distance: 70 laps, 105 mi (169 km)
- Weather: Temperatures around 65.4 °F (18.6 °C), with winds gusting to 17.26 miles per hour (27.78 km/h)
- Average speed: 132.678 mph (213.525 km/h)

Pole position
Driver	Bobby Labonte	Joe Gibbs Racing

Most laps led
Driver	Jeff Gordon	Hendrick Motorsports
- Laps: 49

Winner
No. 24	Jeff Gordon	Hendrick Motorsports

Television in the United States
- Network: TNN
- Announcers: Mike Joy, Buddy Baker, and Ernie Irvan

The 1995 edition of The Winston Select was a stock car racing competition that took place on May 20, 1995. Held at Charlotte Motor Speedway in Concord, North Carolina, the 70-lap race was an exhibition race in the 1994 NASCAR Winston Cup Series. Bobby Labonte of Joe Gibbs Racing won the pole, while Jeff Gordon of Hendrick Motorsports led the most laps and won the race.

The race also started the trend of special paint schemes, with Dale Earnhardt sporting a reverse paint scheme of his GM Goodwrench car.

== Background ==
Charlotte Motor Speedway, the track where the race was held.

The Winston Select was open to winning drivers and team owners from last season through the Save Mart Supermarkets 300 at Sears Point Raceway and all previous All-Star race winners and past NASCAR Winston Cup champions who had attempted to qualify for every race in 1995. The top five finishers of The Winston Select Open advanced to complete the starting grid of 20 cars.

The earnings for The Winston Select were as follows:

The Winston Select earnings
Total purse	US$1,081,000
Qualifying pole winner	US$50,000
Segment 1 & 2 winner(s)	US$50,000
Segment 3 winner	US$200,000
The Winston Select Open winner	US$28,000

=== 1995 The Winston drivers and eligibility ===
==== Race winners in 1994 and 1995 ====
- 2-Rusty Wallace (9 wins from 1994 and 1995)
- 3-Dale Earnhardt (6 wins from 1994 and 1995)
- 4-Sterling Marlin (3 wins from 1994 and 1995, including the 1994 and 1995 Daytona 500)
- 5-Terry Labonte (4 wins from 1994 and 1995)
- 6-Mark Martin (3 wins from 1994 and 1995)
- 7-Geoff Bodine (2 wins in 1994)
- 10-Ricky Rudd (1 win in 1994)
- 23-Jimmy Spencer (2 wins in 1994)
- 24-Jeff Gordon (5 wins from 1994 and 1995)
- 28-Dale Jarrett (1 win in 1994)
- 94-Bill Elliott (1 win in 1994)

==== Winning team owners in 1994 and 1995 ====
- 11-Junior Johnson & Associates with new driver Brett Bodine (1 win in 1994 with Bill Elliott)
- 18-Joe Gibbs Racing with new driver Bobby Labonte (1 win in 1994 with Dale Jarrett)
- 27-Junior Johnson & Associates with new driver Elton Sawyer (2 wins in 1994 with Jimmy Spencer)

==== Previous NASCAR Winston Cup Champions ====
- 17-Darrell Waltrip (3-time NASCAR Winston Cup Series Champion)

==== Top five finishers of The Winston Open ====
- 9-Lake Speed (finished fifth)
- 25-Ken Schrader (finished second)
- 33-Robert Pressley (finished third)
- 75-Todd Bodine (finished first)
- 90-Mike Wallace (finished fourth)

== Race summary ==
=== Segment 1 ===
Bobby Labonte won the pole for the all-star event to collect the US$50,000 bonus. Todd Bodine, Ken Schrader, Robert Pressley, Mike Wallace, and Lake Speed transferred from The Winston Select Open to make the field. Mark Martin and Jeff Gordon served as the onboard camera cars throughout the race. Sterling Marlin had to start at the back of the field after he crashed his primary car during qualifying. Elton Sawyer and Jimmy Spencer also started at the back after missing the drivers' meeting. At the drop of the green flag, Rusty Wallace overtook Bobby Labonte for the first lap before Dale Earnhardt, sporting a silver reverse paint scheme of his iconic GM Goodwrench car, took the lead from laps 2 to 5. Gordon charged forward to take the lead from Earnhardt on lap 6 and kept it until lap 30 to win a caution-free Segment 1 and the US$50,000 bonus while Ricky Rudd and Martin completed the top-three.

Segment results

1. 24-Jeff Gordon ($50,000)
2. 10-Ricky Rudd ($15,000)
3. 6-Mark Martin ($7,500)

=== Segment 2 ===
During the 10-minute break between segments, the fan balloting on whether or not to invert the field for the second 30-lap segment was unveiled. The fans had spoken and the result flashed on the Winston Cup scoreboard — INVERT!

Pressley, who finished last in Segment 1, led the field for a total of 16 laps. The first caution occurred on lap 33 when Spencer and Schrader collided with each other, sending Schrader to the turn 2 wall while Earnhardt spun and made contact with Terry Labonte on the inside line. The race restarted on lap 37, but on lap 40, Earnhardt tapped Jarrett from behind, triggering a multi-car accident involving Jarrett, Martin, Todd Bodine, and Spencer in turn 3 and signaling another caution. The race resumed on lap 44. Gordon powered his way back to the front on lap 47 and crossed the finish line in Segment 2 and collect another US$50,000 bonus while Darrell Waltrip and Earnhardt completed the top-three.

Segment results

1. 24-Jeff Gordon ($50,000)
2. 17-Darrell Waltrip ($15,000)
3. 3-Dale Earnhardt ($7,500)

=== Segment 3 ===
During the final 10-lap shootout, Waltrip jumped the restart, forcing another yellow to redo the restart. When the green flag dropped again, Earnhardt took the lead from the inside line, but he got loose and collided with Waltrip on turn 4, with both Bobby Labonte and Speed losing control on the infield grass and slamming the outside wall. Caution flags do not count in the final segment, setting up a ten-lap dash. When the green flag dropped for the final time, Gordon maintained the lead and took the checkered flag to win the US$200,000 bonus while Marlin finished second and Rudd third.

Race results
Pos	Grid	Car	Driver	Owner	Manufacturer	Laps run	Laps led
1	7	24	Jeff Gordon	Hendrick Motorsports	Chevrolet	70	49
2	5	4	Sterling Marlin	Morgan–McClure Motorsports	Chevrolet	70	2
3	6	10	Ricky Rudd	Rudd Performance Motorsports	Ford	70	0
4	2	2	Rusty Wallace	Penske Racing South	Ford	70	1
5	9	7	Geoff Bodine	Geoff Bodine Racing	Ford	70	0
6	13	94	Bill Elliott	Bill Elliott Racing	Ford	70	0
7	19	33	Robert Pressley	Leo Jackson Motorsports	Chevrolet	70	16
8	19	90	Mike Wallace	Donlavey Racing	Ford	70	0
9	15	23	Jimmy Spencer	Travis Carter Enterprises	Ford	70	0
10	11	11	Brett Bodine	Junior Johnson & Associates	Ford	70	0
11	12	5	Terry Labonte	Hendrick Motorsports	Chevrolet	68	0
12	14	27	Elton Sawyer	Junior Johnson & Associates	Ford	67	0
13	10	17	Darrell Waltrip	Darrell Waltrip Motorsports	Chevrolet	60	0
14	4	3	Dale Earnhardt	Richard Childress Racing	Chevrolet	60	4
15	1	18	Bobby Labonte	Joe Gibbs Racing	Chevrolet	60	0
16	20	9	Lake Speed	Melling Racing	Ford	60	0
17	16	75	Todd Bodine	Butch Mock Motorsports	Ford	39	0
18	8	6	Mark Martin	Roush Racing	Ford	39	0
19	3	28	Dale Jarrett	Robert Yates Racing	Ford	39	0
20	17	25	Ken Schrader	Hendrick Motorsports	Chevrolet	32	10
