= Pit Crew Challenge =

Event held by NASCAR

The NASCAR Pit Crew Challenge is a stock car racing competition held by NASCAR during the All-Star Race weekend. The event is an exhibition pit stop contest featuring the top teams from the NASCAR Cup Series.

The event was cancelled for 2013 due to lack of sponsorship. The event was revived in 2023.

== History ==
The event has its roots traced to the annual Unocal 76 World Pit Crew Competition. The competition was sponsored by ConocoPhillips, through its Union 76 gasoline brand (which at the time was the official fuel of NASCAR).

The competition was conducted during the weekend of the fall race at Rockingham, and was only open to a select few teams, usually the top teams on the circuit. Teams would qualify for the event based on pit stop performance during the season. The teams competed against each other based on elapsed time. Each crew had to complete a full pit stop (tire change, fuel), and had to complete it cleanly for their time to stand. Time penalties, usually five seconds, were added for any violations found by the officials (i.e. loose lugnuts on wheel). The team with the fastest time after penalties were assessed was declared the world championship pit crew for the year.

The 2003 Unocal 76 World Pit Crew Competition proved to be the final held under that name and at that time of year, for two reasons. The first was that Unocal was pulling out of NASCAR, replaced by Sunoco as the sport's official fuel. The second was that thanks to schedule realignment and the Ferko lawsuit, Rockingham was to lose its fall race date. The Pit Crew Competition was renamed the Pit Crew Challenge and moved to the weekend of the Sprint All-Star Challenge at Charlotte.

== Rules ==
Seven pit crew members of each team were allowed. The top eight seeds of the Sprint Cup Series point standings were allowed to have a bye into the second round of the event. The remaining eligible teams were seeded by in order of Sprint Cup owner point standings as positions 9 through 24 and competed in a head-to-head format in the opening round of the challenge.

Each pit crew group (fueler and an assistant, the front tire changer and carrier as another group, the rear tire changer and carrier as another group, and the jackman) was located at separate stations in the arena. For safety reasons, the fuel cans carried nine gallons of water, about the same weight as an eleven-gallon can of racing fuel. Upon the starting signal, the jackman would lift a car on the right side, then lower the car. The tire changers would change the tires of an already-lifted simulated car on their end (front or rear). Both moves were performed on the right side first, then the left. The fueler was required to unload the 18 gallons of water into a simulated fuel tank. When their duties were finished (a NASCAR official would approve) at their time, the six crewmen (the assistant to the fueler does not participate) ran to the start of a 40-yard (36m) dash where all crewmen had to push the car down the length of the arena where the nose of the car reaching the timing beam stops the clock.

Penalties were assessed for starting too early, improperly tightened lug nuts, a jack not raised high enough, spilled water in the fueling station, or excessive water left in the dump can.

Because of the 40-yard push in the competition, most Sprint Cup drivers did not participate in the competition and usually sat next to the crew chief during the event. Typically, a team engineer, a member of the public relations staff, or a driver's wife steered the car during the 40-yard dash. This practice became widespread after the Richard Childress Racing No. 31 team put driver Jeff Burton's wife Kim in the car for the push, winning the 2009 challenge (the car even carried her name, not Jeff's name, above the window). This practice was a weight advantage in the contest, as the cars are not weighed with the driver, while side windows are removed and extra grip tape is applied to the sides to give the mechanics extra grip during the push.

== Past winners ==
=== Rockingham Speedway — Two-tire change ===
- 1967 Cale Yarborough (Wood Brothers Racing No. 21)
- 1968 Cale Yarborough (Wood Brothers Racing No. 21)
- 1969 LeeRoy Yarbrough (Junior Johnson & Associates No. 98)
- 1970 Bobby Allison (Mario Rossi No. 22)
- 1971 Cancelled due to rain
- 1972 Bobby Allison (Junior Johnson & Associates No. 12)
- 1973 Buddy Baker (K&K Insurance Racing No.71)
- 1974 Bobby Allison (Penske Racing No. 12)
- 1975 Donnie Allison (Howard & Egerton Racing No. 27)
- 1976 Richard Petty (Petty Enterprises No. 43)
- 1977 Richard Petty (Petty Enterprises No. 43)
- 1978 Benny Parsons (DeWitt Racing No. 72)
- 1979 Cale Yarborough (Junior Johnson & Associates No. 11)
- 1980 Richard Petty (Petty Enterprises No. 43)
- 1981 Neil Bonnett (Wood Brothers Racing No. 21)
- 1982 Cale Yarborough (M.C. Anderson Racing No. 27)
- 1983 Joe Ruttman (Benfield Racing No. 98)
- 1984 Dick Brooks (Donlavey Racing No.90)

=== Rockingham Speedway— Four-tire change ===
- 1985 Dale Earnhardt (Richard Childress Racing No. 3)
- 1986 Dale Earnhardt (Richard Childress Racing No. 3)
- 1987 Dale Earnhardt (Richard Childress Racing No. 3)
- 1988 Dale Earnhardt (Richard Childress Racing No 3)
- 1989 Darrell Waltrip (Hendrick Motorsports No. 17)
- 1990 Bill Elliott (Melling Racing No. 9)
- 1991 Morgan Shepherd (Bud Moore Engineering No. 15)
- 1992 Ken Schrader (Hendrick Motorsports No. 25)
- 1993 Rusty Wallace (Penske South Racing No. 2)
- 1994 Jeff Gordon (Hendrick Motorsports No. 24)
- 1995 Brett Bodine (Junior Johnson No. 11)
- 1996 Terry Labonte (Hendrick Motorsports No. 5)
- 1997 Bill Elliott (Bill Elliott Racing No. 94)
- 1998 Mike Skinner (Richard Childress Racing No. 31)
- 1999 Bobby Labonte (Joe Gibbs Racing No. 18)
- 2000 Jeff Burton (Roush Racing No. 99)
- 2001 Matt Kenseth (Roush Racing No. 17)
- 2002 Matt Kenseth (Roush Racing No. 17)
- 2003 Bill Elliott (Evernham Motorsports No. 9)

=== Mooresville ===
The National Pit Crew Championship was held for one year at the pit Instruction and training facility in Mooresville, North Carolina on May 9, 2005. The event was discontinued after one edition in favor of the event being hosted at the Spectrum Center during NASCAR All star weekend (which was first held only 10 days later on May 19, 2005).

- 2005 Roush Racing No. 97 (Kurt Busch)

=== Charlotte ===
The event moved indoors to the Spectrum Center These competitions consisted of a four-tire change with jacking, tire change, and gas fill-up done on separate cars, followed by entire pit crew pushing another car 40 yards.
NOTE: The driver of the car does not participate in the contest.

- 2005 Evernham Motorsports No. 9 (Kasey Kahne)
- 2006 Dale Earnhardt, Inc. No. 1 (Martin Truex Jr.)
- 2007 Penske Racing No. 12 (Ryan Newman)
- 2008 Team Red Bull No. 83 (Brian Vickers)
- 2009 Richard Childress Racing No. 31 (Jeff Burton)
- 2010 Joe Gibbs Racing No. 11 (Denny Hamlin)
- 2011 Joe Gibbs Racing No. 11 (Denny Hamlin)
- 2012 Hendrick Motorsports No. 48 (Jimmie Johnson)

=== North Wilkesboro ===
In April 2023 it was reported that the Pit Stop Challenge would be revived for the 2023 All-Star weekend and will consist of a 4 tire change with no refueling. The results of the Pit Crew Challenge determine the starting order of the heat races, along with the starting order of the All-Star Open.

- 2023: Joe Gibbs Racing No. 54 (Ty Gibbs)
- 2024: Joe Gibbs Racing No. 20 (Christopher Bell)
- 2025: Spire Motorsports No. 71 (Michael McDowell)

=== Dover ===
- 2026: Front Row Motorsports No. 38 (Zane Smith)

== See also ==
- NASCAR All-Star Race
- Pit Stop Challenge
