= 2003 The Winston =

19th iteration of the NASCAR All-Star Race

Race details
- Date: May 17, 2003
- Location: Concord, North Carolina, Lowe's Motor Speedway
- Course: Permanent racing facility 1.5 mi (2.4 km)
- Distance: Open: 30 laps, 45 mi (72 km); Segment 1: 20 laps Segment 2: 10 laps The Winston: 90 Laps, 135 mi (217 km); Segment 1: 40 laps Segment 2: 30 laps Segment 3: 20 laps
- Avg Speed: Open: N/A; The Winston: 91.889 mph (147.881 km/h)

Winston Open
- Pole: Steve Park (Richard Childress Racing)
- Time: 29.309
- Winner: Jeff Burton (Roush Racing)

The Winston
- Pole: Bill Elliott (Evernham Motorsports)
- Pole: 2:03:192
- Most laps led: Tony Stewart (Joe Gibbs Racing)
- Laps led: 39
- Winner: Jimmie Johnson (Hendrick Motorsports)

Television
- Network: FX
- Announcers: Mike Joy, Larry McReynolds, Darrell Waltrip
- Network: Motor Racing Network

The 2003 edition of The Winston was the second exhibition stock car race of the 2003 NASCAR Winston Cup Series and the 19th iteration of the event. The race was held on Saturday, May 17, 2003, in Concord, North Carolina at Lowe's Motor Speedway, a 1.5 miles (2.4 km) permanent quad-oval. The race took the scheduled 90 laps to complete. Within the final segment of the race, Hendrick Motorsports driver Jimmie Johnson would manage to make a charge to the front within the last 20 laps of the segment to earn a US$1,017,604 (adjusted for inflation, US$1,780,991) payout and his first career The Winston victory. To fill out the top three, Roush Racing driver Kurt Busch and Joe Gibbs Racing driver Bobby Labonte would finish second and third, respectively.

== Background ==
The layout of Lowe's Motor Speedway, the venue where the race was held.

Lowe's Motor Speedway is a motorsports complex located in Concord, North Carolina, United States 13 miles from Charlotte, North Carolina. The complex features a 1.5 miles (2.4 km) quad oval track that hosts NASCAR racing including the prestigious Coca-Cola 600 on Memorial Day weekend and the NEXTEL All-Star Challenge, as well as the UAW-GM Quality 500. The speedway was built in 1959 by Bruton Smith and is considered the home track for NASCAR with many race teams located in the Charlotte area. The track is owned and operated by Speedway Motorsports Inc. (SMI) with Marcus G. Smith (son of Bruton Smith) as track president.

=== Format and eligibility ===
The popularity of the reality show Survivor influenced Winston to make changes to the format in 2002, adding a new elimination format ("Survival of the Fastest"), and the final segment returned to 20 laps to make tire wear an issue.

Only race winning drivers and owners from the previous year would be in the field, and all former Cup titleholders and the past five winners of The Winston would be added to the field, plus the winner of the qualifying races.

The No Bull Sprint was eliminated after 2002, and for 2003, The Winston Open would become a 20-lap race with pit stops, and then a 10 green flag lap sprint after pit stops.

If the caution flag waved on Lap 40 of the first segment, two green flag laps or the next yellow flag would be run to finish the segment.

In The Winston, only the top 20 cars advanced to the second segment, and 10 cars (in 2002) or 14 cars (in 2003 planned, but was 12 after crashes) advanced to the third segment.

A green flag pit stop for four tires was mandatory in the first segment, but after Frank Stoddard beat the system in 2002 by changing four tires on the car driven by Jeff Burton just feet from the finish line on the last lap, the rule was changed to mandating tire stops at a specific point in the race.

Also, the inversion is moved to the final 20 lap sprint, and the ten-minute break is restored between the second and final segment.

- Segment 1: 40 Laps / Must take a four-tire pit stop during race (In 2003, must be between Laps 10–30) / only top 20 cars advance.
- Segment 2: 30 Laps / Only 14 cars (2003) / 10 cars (2002) advance / full field inversion at end of segment
- Segment 3: 20 Green Flag Laps (no caution laps count)

=== Entry list ===
==== Winston Open ====
#	Driver	Team	Make
0	Jack Sprague (R)	Haas CNC Racing	Pontiac
1	Jeff Green	Dale Earnhardt, Inc.	Chevrolet
01	Mike Wallace	MB2 Motorsports	Pontiac
02	Hermie Sadler	SCORE Motorsports	Pontiac
4	Mike Skinner	Morgan–McClure Motorsports	Pontiac
7	Jimmy Spencer	Ultra Motorsports	Dodge
11	Brett Bodine	Brett Bodine Racing	Ford
14	Larry Foyt (R)	A. J. Foyt Racing	Dodge
16	Greg Biffle (R)	Roush Racing	Ford
19	Jeremy Mayfield	Evernham Motorsports	Dodge
23	Kenny Wallace	Bill Davis Racing	Dodge
30	Jeff Green	Richard Childress Racing	Chevrolet
31	Robby Gordon	Richard Childress Racing	Chevrolet
37	Derrike Cope	Quest Motor Racing	Chevrolet
41	Casey Mears (R)	Chip Ganassi Racing	Dodge
43	John Andretti	Petty Enterprises	Dodge
45	Kyle Petty	Petty Enterprises	Dodge
46	Carl Long	Glenn Racing	Dodge
49	Ken Schrader	BAM Racing	Dodge
54	Todd Bodine	BelCar Motorsports	Ford
71	Kevin Lepage	Marcis Auto Racing	Ford
72	Kirk Shelmerdine	Kirk Shelmerdine Racing	Ford
74	Tony Raines (R)	BACE Motorsports	Chevrolet
77	Dave Blaney	Jasper Motorsports	Ford
89	Morgan Shepherd	Shepherd Racing Ventures	Ford
90	Jason Hedlesky	Donlavey Racing	Ford
99	Jeff Burton	Roush Racing	Ford
Official Winston Open entry list

==== The Winston ====
#	Driver	Team	Make
2	Rusty Wallace	Penske Racing	Dodge
5	Terry Labonte	Hendrick Motorsports	Chevrolet
6	Mark Martin	Roush Racing	Ford
8	Dale Earnhardt Jr.	Dale Earnhardt, Inc.	Chevrolet
9	Bill Elliott	Evernham Motorsports	Dodge
10	Johnny Benson Jr.	MB2 Motorsports	Pontiac
12	Ryan Newman	Penske Racing	Dodge
15	Michael Waltrip	Dale Earnhardt, Inc.	Chevrolet
17	Matt Kenseth	Roush Racing	Ford
18	Bobby Labonte	Joe Gibbs Racing	Chevrolet
20	Tony Stewart	Joe Gibbs Racing	Chevrolet
21	Ricky Rudd	Wood Brothers Racing	Ford
22	Ward Burton	Bill Davis Racing	Dodge
24	Jeff Gordon	Hendrick Motorsports	Chevrolet
25	Joe Nemechek	Hendrick Motorsports	Chevrolet
29	Kevin Harvick	Richard Childress Racing	Chevrolet
32	Ricky Craven	PPI Motorsports	Pontiac
38	Elliott Sadler	Robert Yates Racing	Ford
40	Sterling Marlin	Chip Ganassi Racing	Dodge
42	Jamie McMurray (R)	Chip Ganassi Racing	Dodge
48	Jimmie Johnson	Hendrick Motorsports	Chevrolet
88	Dale Jarrett	Robert Yates Racing	Ford
97	Kurt Busch	Roush Racing	Ford
Official The Winston entry list

== Winston Open practice ==
=== First Winston Open practice ===
The first practice for the Winston Open was held on Friday, May 16, at 1:30 p.m. EST. The session would last for 45 minutes. Steve Park, driving for Richard Childress Racing, would set the fastest time in the session, with a lap of 29.293 and an average speed of 184.344 miles per hour (296.673 km/h).

Pos.	#	Driver	Team	Make	Time	Speed
1	30	Steve Park	Richard Childress Racing	Chevrolet	29.293	184.344
2	19	Jeremy Mayfield	Evernham Motorsports	Dodge	29.525	182.896
3	01	Mike Wallace	MB2 Motorsports	Pontiac	29.584	182.531
Full first Winston Open practice results

=== Second Winston Open practice ===
The second practice for the Winston Open was held on Friday, May 16, at 3:55 p.m. EST. The session would last for 45 minutes. Todd Bodine, driving for BelCar Motorsports, would set the fastest time in the session, with a lap of 29.489 and an average speed of 183.119 miles per hour (294.701 km/h).

Pos.	#	Driver	Team	Make	Time	Speed
1	54	Todd Bodine	BelCar Motorsports	Ford	29.489	183.119
2	23	Kenny Wallace	Bill Davis Racing	Dodge	29.544	182.778
3	19	Jeremy Mayfield	Evernham Motorsports	Dodge	29.564	182.655
Full second Winston Open practice results

=== Final Winston Open practice ===
The final practice for the Winston Open was held on Friday, May 16. The session would last for 30 minutes. Todd Bodine, driving for BelCar Motorsports, would set the fastest time in the session, with a lap of 30.017 and an average speed of 179.898 miles per hour (289.518 km/h).

Pos.	#	Driver	Team	Make	Time	Speed
1	54	Todd Bodine	BelCar Motorsports	Ford	30.017	179.898
2	99	Jeff Burton	Roush Racing	Ford	30.077	179.539
3	30	Steve Park	Richard Childress Racing	Chevrolet	30.088	179.473
Full Happy Hour Winston Open practice results

== The Winston practice ==
=== First The Winston practice ===
The first practice for The Winston was held on Friday, May 16, at 2:20 p.m. EST. The session would last for 45 minutes. Jimmie Johnson, driving for Hendrick Motorsports, would set the fastest time in the session, with a lap of 29.872 and an average speed of 180.771 miles per hour (290.923 km/h).

Pos.	#	Driver	Team	Make	Time	Speed
1	48	Jimmie Johnson	Hendrick Motorsports	Chevrolet	29.872	180.771
2	8	Dale Earnhardt Jr.	Dale Earnhardt, Inc.	Chevrolet	29.922	180.469
3	20	Tony Stewart	Joe Gibbs Racing	Chevrolet	29.930	180.421
Full first The Winston practice results

=== Second The Winston practice ===
The second practice for The Winston was held on Friday, May 16, at 4:45 p.m. EST. The session would last for 45 minutes. Tony Stewart, driving for Joe Gibbs Racing, would set the fastest time in the session, with a lap of 29.463 and an average speed of 183.281 miles per hour (294.962 km/h).

Pos.	#	Driver	Team	Make	Time	Speed
1	20	Tony Stewart	Joe Gibbs Racing	Chevrolet	29.463	183.281
2	12	Ryan Newman	Penske Racing South	Dodge	29.525	182.896
3	9	Bill Elliott	Evernham Motorsports	Dodge	29.551	182.735
Full second The Winston practice results

=== Final The Winston practice ===
The final practice for The Winston was held on Friday, May 16, at 10:30 p.m. EST. The session would last for 30 minutes. Ryan Newman, driving for Penske Racing South, would set the fastest time in the session, with a lap of 30.181 and an average speed of 178.921 miles per hour (287.945 km/h).

Pos.	#	Driver	Team	Make	Time	Speed
1	12	Ryan Newman	Penske Racing South	Dodge	30.181	178.921
2	20	Tony Stewart	Joe Gibbs Racing	Chevrolet	30.258	178.465
3	18	Bobby Labonte	Joe Gibbs Racing	Chevrolet	30.297	178.236
Full Happy Hour The Winston practice results

== Qualifying ==
=== The Winston Open ===
Qualifying for the Winston Open was held on Friday, May 16, at 6:05 p.m. EST. Each driver would have two laps to set a fastest time; the fastest of the two would count as their official qualifying lap.

Steve Park, driving for Richard Childress Racing, would win the pole, setting a time of 29.309 and an average speed of 184.244 miles per hour (296.512 km/h).

Pos.	#	Driver	Team	Make	Time	Speed
1	30	Steve Park	Richard Childress Racing	Chevrolet	29.309	184.244
2	54	Todd Bodine	BelCar Motorsports	Ford	29.401	183.667
3	7	Jimmy Spencer	Ultra Motorsports	Dodge	29.449	183.368
4	01	Mike Wallace	MB2 Motorsports	Pontiac	29.475	183.206
5	23	Kenny Wallace	Bill Davis Racing	Dodge	29.513	182.970
6	49	Ken Schrader	BAM Racing	Dodge	29.522	182.914
7	4	Mike Skinner	Morgan–McClure Motorsports	Pontiac	29.522	182.914
8	11	Brett Bodine	Brett Bodine Racing	Ford	29.531	182.859
9	74	Tony Raines (R)	BACE Motorsports	Chevrolet	29.560	182.679
10	77	Dave Blaney	Jasper Motorsports	Ford	29.574	182.593
11	1	Jeff Green	Dale Earnhardt, Inc.	Chevrolet	29.611	182.365
12	19	Jeremy Mayfield	Evernham Motorsports	Dodge	29.675	181.971
13	0	Jack Sprague (R)	Haas CNC Racing	Pontiac	29.688	181.892
14	31	Robby Gordon	Richard Childress Racing	Chevrolet	29.706	181.781
15	45	Kyle Petty	Petty Enterprises	Dodge	29.736	181.598
16	43	John Andretti	Petty Enterprises	Dodge	29.753	181.494
17	14	Larry Foyt (R)	A. J. Foyt Racing	Dodge	29.785	181.299
18	99	Jeff Burton	Roush Racing	Ford	29.848	180.917
19	41	Casey Mears (R)	Chip Ganassi Racing	Dodge	29.901	180.596
20	72	Kirk Shelmerdine	Kirk Shelmerdine Racing	Ford	30.210	178.749
21	37	Derrike Cope	Quest Motor Racing	Chevrolet	30.274	178.371
22	02	Hermie Sadler	SCORE Motorsports	Chevrolet	30.297	178.236
23	71	Kevin Lepage	Marcis Auto Racing	Ford	30.424	177.492
24	46	Carl Long	Glenn Racing	Dodge	30.571	176.638
25	90	Jason Hedlesky	Donlavey Racing	Ford	31.412	171.909
26	89	Morgan Shepherd	Shepherd Racing Ventures	Ford	34.061	158.539
27	16	Greg Biffle (R)	Roush Racing	Ford	-	-
Official Winston Open qualifying results

=== The Winston ===
Qualifying for The Winston was held on Friday, May 16, at 8:05 p.m. EST. Each driver would run 3 laps each, with each driver having to do a mandatory pit stop following the driver's first or second lap.

Bill Elliott, driving for Evernham Motorsports, would win the pole, setting a time of 2:03.192 and an average speed of 43.834 miles per hour (70.544 km/h).

Pos.	#	Driver	Team	Make	Time	Speed
1	9	Bill Elliott	Evernham Motorsports	Dodge	2:03:192	43.834
2	20	Tony Stewart	Joe Gibbs Racing	Chevrolet	2:03:764	43.631
3	29	Kevin Harvick	Richard Childress Racing	Chevrolet	2:04:825	43.261
4	8	Dale Earnhardt Jr.	Dale Earnhardt, Inc.	Chevrolet	2:05:014	43.195
5	40	Sterling Marlin	Chip Ganassi Racing	Dodge	2:05:038	43.187
6	25	Joe Nemechek	Hendrick Motorsports	Chevrolet	2:05:047	43.184
7	32	Ricky Craven	PPI Motorsports	Pontiac	2:05:049	43.183
8	5	Terry Labonte	Hendrick Motorsports	Chevrolet	2:05:103	43.164
9	15	Michael Waltrip	Dale Earnhardt, Inc.	Chevrolet	2:05:105	43.164
10	24	Jeff Gordon	Hendrick Motorsports	Chevrolet	2:05:358	43.077
11	97	Kurt Busch	Roush Racing	Ford	2:05:417	43.056
12	12	Ryan Newman	Penske Racing South	Dodge	2:05:668	42.970
13	22	Ward Burton	Bill Davis Racing	Dodge	2:05:671	42.969
14	6	Mark Martin	Roush Racing	Ford	2:05:949	42.875
15	10	Johnny Benson Jr.	MBV Motorsports	Pontiac	2:06:012	42.853
16	48	Jimmie Johnson	Hendrick Motorsports	Chevrolet	2:06:013	42.853
17	17	Matt Kenseth	Roush Racing	Ford	2:06:396	42.723
18	2	Rusty Wallace	Penske Racing South	Dodge	2:09:805	41.601
19	38	Elliott Sadler	Robert Yates Racing	Ford	2:09:959	41.552
20	21	Ricky Rudd	Wood Brothers Racing	Ford	2:10:242	41.461
21	18	Bobby Labonte	Joe Gibbs Racing	Chevrolet	2:23:340	37.673
22	88	Dale Jarrett	Robert Yates Racing	Ford	2:23:623	37.598
23	42	Jamie McMurray (R)	Chip Ganassi Racing	Dodge	-	-
Official The Winston qualifying results

== Winston Open results ==
Fin	St	#	Driver	Team	Make	Laps	Led	Status	Winnings
1	18	99	Jeff Burton	Roush Racing	Ford	30	10	running	$52,388
2	10	77	Dave Blaney	Jasper Motorsports	Ford	30	0	running	$42,388
3	7	4	Mike Skinner	Morgan–McClure Motorsports	Pontiac	30	11	running	$38,388
4	8	11	Brett Bodine	Brett Bodine Racing	Ford	30	0	running	$36,388
5	27	16	Greg Biffle (R)	Roush Racing	Ford	30	0	running	$35,388
6	3	7	Jimmy Spencer	Ultra Motorsports	Dodge	30	0	running	$33,388
7	5	23	Kenny Wallace	Bill Davis Racing	Dodge	30	5	running	$32,388
8	1	30	Steve Park	Richard Childress Racing	Chevrolet	30	1	running	$31,788
9	15	45	Kyle Petty	Petty Enterprises	Dodge	30	0	running	$31,288
10	13	0	Jack Sprague (R)	Haas CNC Racing	Pontiac	30	0	running	$31,038
11	16	43	John Andretti	Petty Enterprises	Dodge	30	0	running	$30,788
12	19	41	Casey Mears (R)	Chip Ganassi Racing	Dodge	30	0	running	$30,538
13	6	49	Ken Schrader	BAM Racing	Dodge	30	0	running	$30,288
14	14	31	Robby Gordon	Richard Childress Racing	Chevrolet	26	0	overheating	$30,188
15	11	1	Jeff Green	Dale Earnhardt, Inc.	Chevrolet	20	0	did not advance	$30,088
16	4	01	Mike Wallace	MB2 Motorsports	Pontiac	20	0	did not advance	$29,988
17	17	14	Larry Foyt (R)	A. J. Foyt Racing	Dodge	20	0	did not advance	$29,888
18	12	19	Jeremy Mayfield	Evernham Motorsports	Dodge	20	0	did not advance	$29,788
19	9	74	Tony Raines (R)	BACE Motorsports	Chevrolet	20	0	did not advance	$29,688
20	24	46	Carl Long	Glenn Racing	Dodge	20	0	did not advance	$29,588
21	21	37	Derrike Cope	Quest Motor Racing	Chevrolet	20	0	did not advance	$29,488
22	20	72	Kirk Shelmerdine	Kirk Shelmerdine Racing	Ford	20	0	did not advance	$29,388
23	26	89	Morgan Shepherd	Shepherd Racing Ventures	Ford	20	0	did not advance	$29,288
24	25	90	Jason Hedlesky	Donlavey Racing	Ford	19	0	did not advance	$29,188
25	22	02	Hermie Sadler	SCORE Motorsports	Chevrolet	18	0	handling	$29,088
26	23	71	Kevin Lepage	Marcis Auto Racing	Ford	16	0	overheating	$28,988
27	2	54	Todd Bodine	BelCar Motorsports	Ford	4	3	accident	$28,912
Official Winston Open results

== The Winston results ==
Fin	St	#	Driver	Team	Make	Laps	Led	Status	Winnings
1	16	48	Jimmie Johnson	Hendrick Motorsports	Chevrolet	90	16	running	$1,017,604
2	11	97	Kurt Busch	Roush Racing	Ford	90	7	running	$265,104
3	21	18	Bobby Labonte	Joe Gibbs Racing	Chevrolet	90	0	running	$130,104
4	6	25	Joe Nemechek	Hendrick Motorsports	Chevrolet	90	0	running	$85,104
5	9	15	Michael Waltrip	Dale Earnhardt, Inc.	Chevrolet	90	0	running	$81,104
6	17	17	Matt Kenseth	Roush Racing	Ford	90	0	running	$77,104
7	3	29	Kevin Harvick	Richard Childress Racing	Chevrolet	90	19	running	$93,104
8	10	24	Jeff Gordon	Hendrick Motorsports	Chevrolet	90	4	running	$72,104
9	24	99	Jeff Burton	Roush Racing	Ford	90	0	running	$123,492
10	7	32	Ricky Craven	PPI Motorsports	Pontiac	90	0	running	$70,104
11	20	21	Ricky Rudd	Wood Brothers Racing	Ford	90	0	running	$69,104
12	5	40	Sterling Marlin	Chip Ganassi Racing	Dodge	90	0	running	$68,104
13	8	5	Terry Labonte	Hendrick Motorsports	Chevrolet	69	0	accident	$67,104
14	2	20	Tony Stewart	Joe Gibbs Racing	Chevrolet	69	39	accident	$126,604
15	14	6	Mark Martin	Roush Racing	Ford	69	0	accident/eliminated	$66,104
16	1	9	Bill Elliott	Evernham Motorsports	Dodge	69	0	accident/eliminated	$116,004
17	4	8	Dale Earnhardt Jr.	Dale Earnhardt, Inc.	Chevrolet	69	5	accident/eliminated	$65,904
18	22	88	Dale Jarrett	Robert Yates Racing	Ford	69	0	accident/eliminated	$65,804
19	12	12	Ryan Newman	Penske Racing South	Dodge	65	0	accident	$65,704
20	13	22	Ward Burton	Bill Davis Racing	Dodge	55	0	accident	$65,604
21	18	2	Rusty Wallace	Penske Racing South	Dodge	40	0	eliminated	$65,504
22	23	42	Jamie McMurray (R)	Chip Ganassi Racing	Dodge	40	0	eliminated	$65,404
23	19	38	Elliott Sadler	Robert Yates Racing	Ford	40	0	eliminated	$65,304
24	15	10	Johnny Benson Jr.	MBV Motorsports	Pontiac	40	0	eliminated	$65,208
Official The Winston results
