= 2018 Monster Energy NASCAR All-Star Race =

34th iteration of the NASCAR All-Star Race

Race details
- The 2018 Monster Energy NASCAR All-Star Race program cover, with artwork by NASCAR artist Sam Bass.
- Date: May 19, 2018
- Location: Charlotte Motor Speedway in Concord, North Carolina
- Course: Permanent racing facility 1.5 mi (2.4 km)
- Distance: Open: 50 laps, 75 mi (121 km); All-Star Race: 93 laps, 139.5 mi (224.5 km)
- Avg Speed: Open: 98.720 mph (158.874 km/h); All-Star Race: 84.688 mph (136.292 km/h)

Monster Energy Open
- Pole: Aric Almirola (Stewart–Haas Racing)
- Time: N/A
- Winner (segment 1): Alex Bowman (Hendrick Motorsports)
- Winner (segment 2): Daniel Suárez (Joe Gibbs Racing)
- Winner (segment 3): A. J. Allmendinger (JTG Daugherty Racing)
- Fan Vote winners: Chase Elliott (Hendrick Motorsports)

Monster Energy NASCAR All-Star Race
- Pole: Matt Kenseth (Roush Fenway Racing)
- Time: 127.644
- Most laps led: Kevin Harvick (Stewart–Haas Racing)
- Laps led: 36
- Winner: Kevin Harvick (Stewart–Haas Racing)

Television
- Network: FS1
- Announcers: Mike Joy, Jeff Gordon and Darrell Waltrip
- Nielsen ratings: 1.5 (Overnight)

Radio
- Network: Motor Racing Network
- Announcers: Joe Moore, Jeff Striegle and Rusty Wallace (Booth); Dave Moody (1 & 2); Kyle Rickey (3 & 4) (Turns)

The 2018 Monster Energy NASCAR All-Star Race (XXXIV) was a Monster Energy NASCAR Cup Series stock car exhibition race held on May 19, 2018 at Charlotte Motor Speedway in Concord, North Carolina. Contested over 93 laps—extended from 80 laps due to an overtime finish, it was the second exhibition race of the 2018 Monster Energy NASCAR Cup Series season.

== Report ==
=== Background ===
Charlotte Motor Speedway, the track where the race was held.

The All-Star Race was open to race winners from last season through the 2018 KC Masterpiece 400 at Kansas Speedway and all previous All-Star race winners and Monster Race NASCAR Cup champions who had attempted to qualify for every race in 2018 were eligible to compete in the All-Star Race.

==== Entry list ====
===== Monster Energy Open =====
No.	Driver	Team	Manufacturer
00	Landon Cassill	StarCom Racing	Chevrolet
9	Chase Elliott	Hendrick Motorsports	Chevrolet
10	Aric Almirola	Stewart–Haas Racing	Ford
13	Ty Dillon	Germain Racing	Chevrolet
15	Ross Chastain (i)	Premium Motorsports	Chevrolet
19	Daniel Suárez	Joe Gibbs Racing	Toyota
20	Erik Jones	Joe Gibbs Racing	Toyota
21	Paul Menard	Wood Brothers Racing	Ford
23	Gray Gaulding	BK Racing	Toyota
24	William Byron (R)	Hendrick Motorsports	Chevrolet
32	Matt DiBenedetto	Go Fas Racing	Ford
34	Michael McDowell	Front Row Motorsports	Ford
37	Chris Buescher	JTG Daugherty Racing	Chevrolet
38	David Ragan	Front Row Motorsports	Ford
43	Bubba Wallace (R)	Richard Petty Motorsports	Chevrolet
47	A. J. Allmendinger	JTG Daugherty Racing	Chevrolet
51	B. J. McLeod (i)	Rick Ware Racing	Chevrolet
55	Reed Sorenson	Premium Motorsports	Chevrolet
66	Timmy Hill (i)	MBM Motorsports	Toyota
72	Corey LaJoie	TriStar Motorsports	Chevrolet
88	Alex Bowman	Hendrick Motorsports	Chevrolet
Official entry list

===== Monster Energy NASCAR All-Star Race =====
No.	Driver	Team	Manufacturer
1	Jamie McMurray	Chip Ganassi Racing	Chevrolet
2	Brad Keselowski	Team Penske	Ford
3	Austin Dillon	Richard Childress Racing	Chevrolet
4	Kevin Harvick	Stewart–Haas Racing	Ford
6	Matt Kenseth	Roush Fenway Racing	Ford
11	Denny Hamlin	Joe Gibbs Racing	Toyota
12	Ryan Blaney	Team Penske	Ford
14	Clint Bowyer	Stewart–Haas Racing	Ford
17	Ricky Stenhouse Jr.	Roush Fenway Racing	Ford
18	Kyle Busch	Joe Gibbs Racing	Toyota
22	Joey Logano	Team Penske	Ford
31	Ryan Newman	Richard Childress Racing	Chevrolet
41	Kurt Busch	Stewart–Haas Racing	Ford
42	Kyle Larson	Chip Ganassi Racing	Chevrolet
48	Jimmie Johnson	Hendrick Motorsports	Chevrolet
78	Martin Truex Jr.	Furniture Row Racing	Toyota
95	Kasey Kahne	Leavine Family Racing	Chevrolet
Official entry list

== Monster Energy Open/All-Star practice ==
Kevin Harvick was the fastest in the Open/All-Star practice session with a time of 31.689 seconds and a speed of 170.406 mph (274.242 km/h).

Pos	No.	Driver	Team	Manufacturer	Time	Speed
1	4	Kevin Harvick	Stewart–Haas Racing	Ford	31.689	170.406
2	41	Kurt Busch	Stewart–Haas Racing	Ford	31.858	169.502
3	11	Denny Hamlin	Joe Gibbs Racing	Toyota	31.872	169.428
Official Monster Energy Open/All-Star practice results

== Qualifying (Open) ==
Open qualifying for Friday was cancelled due to weather and Aric Almirola was awarded the pole as a result.

=== Starting Lineup (Open) ===
Pos	No.	Driver	Team	Manufacturer
1	10	Aric Almirola	Stewart–Haas Racing	Ford
2	20	Erik Jones	Joe Gibbs Racing	Toyota
3	88	Alex Bowman	Hendrick Motorsports	Chevrolet
4	9	Chase Elliott	Hendrick Motorsports	Chevrolet
5	21	Paul Menard	Wood Brothers Racing	Ford
6	24	William Byron (R)	Hendrick Motorsports	Chevrolet
7	19	Daniel Suárez	Joe Gibbs Racing	Toyota
8	43	Bubba Wallace (R)	Richard Petty Motorsports	Chevrolet
9	47	A. J. Allmendinger	JTG Daugherty Racing	Chevrolet
10	38	David Ragan	Front Row Motorsports	Ford
11	37	Chris Buescher	JTG Daugherty Racing	Chevrolet
12	34	Michael McDowell	Front Row Motorsports	Ford
13	32	Matt DiBenedetto	Go Fas Racing	Ford
14	13	Ty Dillon	Germain Racing	Chevrolet
15	72	Corey LaJoie	Tri-Star Motorsports	Chevrolet
16	15	Ross Chastain (i)	Premium Motorsports	Chevrolet
17	00	Landon Cassill	StarCom Racing	Chevrolet
18	23	Gray Gaulding	BK Racing	Toyota
19	51	B. J. McLeod (i)	Rick Ware Racing	Chevrolet
20	55	Reed Sorenson	Premium Motorsports	Chevrolet
21	66	Timmy Hill (i)	MBM Motorsports	Toyota
Official Open starting lineup

== Qualifying (All-Star Race) ==
Matt Kenseth scored the pole for the race with a time of 127.644 and a speed of 126.915 mph (204.250 km/h).

=== All-Star Race qualifying results ===
Pos	No.	Driver	Team	Manufacturer	Time
1	6	Matt Kenseth	Roush Fenway Racing	Ford	127.644
2	17	Ricky Stenhouse Jr.	Roush Fenway Racing	Ford	128.137
3	14	Clint Bowyer	Stewart–Haas Racing	Ford	128.334
4	4	Kevin Harvick	Stewart–Haas Racing	Ford	128.741
5	78	Martin Truex Jr.	Furniture Row Racing	Toyota	128.944
6	12	Ryan Blaney	Team Penske	Ford	129.072
7	18	Kyle Busch	Joe Gibbs Racing	Toyota	129.159
8	2	Brad Keselowski	Team Penske	Ford	129.639
9	3	Austin Dillon	Richard Childress Racing	Chevrolet	129.872
10	22	Joey Logano	Team Penske	Ford	130.501
11	48	Jimmie Johnson	Hendrick Motorsports	Chevrolet	131.043
12	1	Jamie McMurray	Chip Ganassi Racing	Chevrolet	131.595
13	31	Ryan Newman	Richard Childress Racing	Chevrolet	133.850
14	11	Denny Hamlin	Joe Gibbs Racing	Toyota	135.866
15	41	Kurt Busch	Stewart–Haas Racing	Ford	135.996
16	42	Kyle Larson	Chip Ganassi Racing	Chevrolet	137.776
17	95	Kasey Kahne	Leavine Family Racing	Chevrolet	145.643
Official All-Star qualifying results

== Monster Energy Open ==
=== Monster Energy Open results ===
Pos	Grid	No.	Driver	Team	Manufacturer	Laps
1	9	47	A. J. Allmendinger	JTG Daugherty Racing	Chevrolet	50
2	2	20	Erik Jones	Joe Gibbs Racing	Toyota	50
3	4	9	Chase Elliott	Hendrick Motorsports	Chevrolet	50
4	5	21	Paul Menard	Wood Brothers Racing	Ford	50
5	11	37	Chris Buescher	JTG Daugherty Racing	Chevrolet	50
6	1	10	Aric Almirola	Stewart–Haas Racing	Ford	50
7	6	24	William Byron (R)	Hendrick Motorsports	Chevrolet	50
8	14	13	Ty Dillon	Germain Racing	Chevrolet	50
9	10	38	David Ragan	Front Row Motorsports	Ford	50
10	12	34	Michael McDowell	Front Row Motorsports	Ford	50
11	8	43	Bubba Wallace (R)	Richard Petty Motorsports	Chevrolet	50
12	13	32	Matt DiBenedetto	Go Fas Racing	Ford	50
13	17	00	Landon Cassill	StarCom Racing	Chevrolet	50
14	18	23	Gray Gaulding	BK Racing	Toyota	50
15	15	72	Corey LaJoie	TriStar Motorsports	Chevrolet	50
16	19	51	B. J. McLeod (i)	Rick Ware Racing	Chevrolet	50
17	16	15	Ross Chastain (i)	Premium Motorsports	Chevrolet	50
18	21	66	Timmy Hill (i)	MBM Motorsports	Toyota	50
19	20	55	Reed Sorenson	Premium Motorsports	Chevrolet	50
20	7	19	Daniel Suárez	Joe Gibbs Racing	Toyota	40^{a}
21	3	88	Alex Bowman	Hendrick Motorsports	Chevrolet	20^{b}
^a Winner of the second segment.^b Winner of the first segment.
Monster Energy Open race results

== All-Star Race ==
=== All-Star Race results ===
Pos	Grid	No	Driver	Team	Manufacturer	Laps
1	4	4	Kevin Harvick	Stewart–Haas Racing	Ford	93
2	19	19	Daniel Suárez	Joe Gibbs Racing	Toyota	93
3	10	22	Joey Logano	Team Penske	Ford	93
4	14	11	Denny Hamlin	Joe Gibbs Racing	Toyota	93
5	21	9	Chase Elliott	Hendrick Motorsports	Chevrolet	93
6	11	48	Jimmie Johnson	Hendrick Motorsports	Chevrolet	93
7	16	42	Kyle Larson	Chip Ganassi Racing	Chevrolet	93
8	20	47	A. J. Allmendinger	JTG Daugherty Racing	Chevrolet	93
9	7	18	Kyle Busch	Joe Gibbs Racing	Toyota	93
10	17	95	Kasey Kahne	Leavine Family Racing	Chevrolet	93
11	2	17	Ricky Stenhouse Jr.	Roush Fenway Racing	Ford	93
12	9	3	Austin Dillon	Richard Childress Racing	Chevrolet	93
13	12	1	Jamie McMurray	Chip Ganassi Racing	Chevrolet	93
14	1	6	Matt Kenseth	Roush Fenway Racing	Ford	93
15	6	12	Ryan Blaney	Team Penske	Ford	93
16	13	31	Ryan Newman	Richard Childress Racing	Chevrolet	93
17	5	78	Martin Truex Jr.	Furniture Row Racing	Toyota	75
18	15	41	Kurt Busch	Stewart–Haas Racing	Ford	74
19	3	14	Clint Bowyer	Stewart–Haas Racing	Ford	74
20	8	2	Brad Keselowski	Team Penske	Ford	74
21	18	88	Alex Bowman	Hendrick Motorsports	Chevrolet	68
Monster Energy NASCAR All-Star Race results

== Media ==
=== Television ===
Fox Sports was the television broadcaster of the race in the United States. Lap-by-lap announcer, Mike Joy, was accompanied on the broadcast by retired NASCAR drivers, Jeff Gordon and Darrell Waltrip. Jamie Little, Vince Welch, and Matt Yocum reported from pit lane.

FS1 Television
Booth announcers	Pit reporters
Lap-by-lap: Mike Joy; Color-commentator: Jeff Gordon; Color commentator: Darrell Waltrip	Jamie Little; Vince Welch; Matt Yocum

=== Radio ===
Motor Racing Network (MRN) continued their longstanding relationship with the track to broadcast the race on radio. The lead announcers for the race's broadcast were Mike Bagley, Jeff Striegle and Rusty Wallace. The network also implemented two announcers on each side of the track: Dave Moody in turns 1 and 2 and Kyle Rickey in turns 3 and 4. Alex Hayden, Winston Kelly, Kim Coon, and Steve Post were the network's pit lane reporters. The network's broadcast was also simulcasted on Sirius XM NASCAR Radio.

MRN Radio
Booth announcers	Turn announcers	Pit reporters
Lead announcer: Mike Bagley; Announcer: Jeff Striegle; Announcer: Rusty Wallace	Turns 1 & 2: Dave Moody; Turns 3 & 4: Dillon Welch	Alex Hayden; Winston Kelly; Kim Coon; Steve Post
