= NASCAR All-Star Race =

Auto race held in the United States

NASCAR Cup Series
- Venue: North Wilkesboro Speedway (2023–2025, 2027); Dover Motor Speedway (2026); Texas Motor Speedway (2021–2022); Bristol Motor Speedway (2020); Charlotte Motor Speedway (1985, 1987–2019); Atlanta Motor Speedway (1986)
- Location: North Wilkesboro, North Carolina, United States (2023–2025, 2027); Dover, Delaware, United States (2026); Fort Worth, Texas, United States (2021–2022); Bristol, Tennessee, United States (2020); Concord, North Carolina, United States (1985, 1987–2019); Hampton, Georgia, United States (1986)

Circuit information
- Surface: Asphalt
- Length: 0.625 mi (1.006 km)
- Turns: 4

The NASCAR All-Star Race is a non-championship, all-star race held annually since 1985. For a majority of the history of the all-star race, the race was held at Charlotte Motor Speedway, (Note: The 1986 event was held in Atlanta.) but has been changing venues since 2020 with all races being held at tracks owned by Speedway Motorsports.

== History ==
The first running of the race was held in 1985 at NASCAR's longest and fastest non-restrictor-plate superspeedway Charlotte Motor Speedway (briefly renamed Lowe's Motor Speedway from 1999, before reverting to the original in 2009) and was run there every year until 2019, except in 1986 when it was run at Atlanta Motor Speedway. Michael Waltrip became the first driver to win the All-Star race after transferring in from a qualifying race in 1996. Until 2001, the rule restricted only champions of the past five All Star Challenge events, but in 2005, the rule became the winners in the past ten years of either the NASCAR Cup Series or the All-Star Race. For 2015, the full-time drivers who have won a NASCAR Cup Series or All-Star Race are now exempt, regardless of when they won the race. The All-Star Open (formerly the "Showdown" from 2008 to 2016; the Open name was also used under Winston and Nextel sponsorships) was restricted to the top 50 drivers in either the final standings of the previous year or current standings in the current year. From 2000 to 2002, and again starting in 2015, two qualifying races are implemented.

In 2004, Nextel, predecessor to Sprint, added a vote of race spectators, internet users and Sprint cellphone users to add one additional driver not in the field, but in the Showdown, and finishing on the lead lap, to the final starting field. For 2008, the event's name featured the use of the edition of the race in Roman numerals, with the 2008 race's official name being the "Sprint All-Star Race XXIV". Also, the fan entry driver was changed, with the new formula coming from those attending races up to that point, Sprint retail locations and double votes from Sprint subscribers. In 2014, the Showdown race was moved to the night preceding the All-Star Race. To replace the event, Charlotte Motor Speedway president, Marcus Smith announced that qualifying for the All-Star Race will take place shortly before the main event.

In 2020, the race was moved to Bristol Motor Speedway in July, as the COVID-19 pandemic prevented Charlotte from accommodating fans. The venue changed again in 2021 to Texas Motor Speedway, which replaced its spring date with the All-Star Race. In 2023, during NASCAR's 75th anniversary season, the race moved once more to North Wilkesboro Speedway. In 2026, the race was moved to Dover Motor Speedway. The following year, the race was moved back to North Wilkesboro.

=== Format history ===
One segment (1985–1986)

The twelve race winners from the 1984 season participated in the inaugural running of the Winston at Charlotte Motor Speedway. The race was 70 laps with one pit stop required. It was held the day before the Coca-Cola World 600. A $10,000 bonus was paid to the leader of Lap 20 for leading that lap. Terry Labonte won that bonus.

From its first year, the unique moniker "The Winston" was adopted by sponsor R. J. Reynolds. Rather than referring to the event as a traditional "All star" race, no generic reference was included in the title. Due to limitations on television tobacco advertising, other races which involved tobacco title sponsorship utilized generic names on network television. For example, on ABC, the Winston 500 was called the "Talladega 500" and the Marlboro 500 was called the "Michigan 500." Without a generic alternative, television and other media were forced to acknowledge Winston as the title sponsor, effectively skirting, and pushing the limits of tobacco advertising regulation. The event is, however, referred to as "The All-Star" in NASCAR Thunder 2003 and NASCAR Thunder 2004, EA Sports' games based on the last seasons of Winston title sponsorship. By 2004, Nextel used the "All-Star" name in the event, which NASCAR has since adopted.

The race moved to Atlanta International Raceway in 1986, with a 200 kilometer format of 83 laps (126.326 miles) on Mother's Day, a day typically avoided on the NASCAR calendar. Like its previous counterpart, green flag pit stops were mandatory, and only winners from the 1985 season were eligible. Only nine different drivers won a race in 1985, so the highest placed non-winner in final 1985 points, Geoff Bodine, was added to the field for an even 10 cars. A 100-lap (152.2 miles) consolation race for the rest of the drivers, the Atlanta Invitational was held the same day. It featured only thirteen participants, and was won by Benny Parsons. A lackluster crowd of only 18,500 attended the second edition of the Winston, with only twenty-three cars racing in the two races combined.

Three segments — 75 laps, 50 laps, 10 green flag laps (1987–1989)

The race returned to Charlotte with a new 135-lap (202.5 mile), three-segment format which reflected on NASCAR's short-track roots. A new date was introduced, the weekend before the Coca-Cola 600, which gave teams a popular two weeks of festivities, known locally and by both die-hard fans and teams as "The Two Weeks of Speed" at what is generally considered most teams' home track. Live national television coverage on ABC would also be featured for the first of four years. This format consisted of a 75-lap first segment, with a mandatory green flag pit stop, a 50-lap second segment, and a 10-green flag lap final sprint. Each segment would be separated by a ten-minute break.

In addition to the race format, the method for choosing participants changed. The 20-driver field consisted of the past nineteen race winners, regardless of season. The remaining drivers would participate in a 100-lap, last-chance race, the Winston Open, with the winner advancing to the final starting position.

In 1989, qualifying for the starting lineup for the Winston changed to a three-lap time trial with the fastest lap key and a quick-pit two-tire pit stop.

- Segment 1: 75 laps / mandatory green-flag pit stop
- Segment 2: 50 laps
- Segment 3: 10 green flag laps (no caution laps count)

Two segments — 50 laps, 20 laps (1990–1991)

After a pair of controversial dashes in the previous three years which infuriated fans, the race was cut to two segments of 50 and 20 laps to prevent some of the reckless driving, giving the race its 70-lap total distance which would be used until 2001.

The ten-minute break was installed between segments. During the break, a fan vote would determine whether or not the field should be inverted for the second segment.

Two changes were made in qualification in 1991. Automatic berths were given only to race-winning drivers and owners in 1990 and 1991 up until The Winston. Also, the Winston Open was reduced to 50 laps, with the winner automatically advancing to the Winston. To guarantee 20 cars in the Winston field, it would be filled out by the top finishers (e.g., 2nd, 3rd, etc.) in the Winston Open advancing to the main event until the field reached 20 cars.

ABC carried the race in 1990, with the Winston Open finish, and CBS carried both the Open and the Winston in 1991. In 1991, to add to the day of events, the NASCAR Legends Race was held on a quarter-mile oval paved between the Charlotte Motor Speedway Dog-Leg front stretch, or quad-oval, and between the first and second pit row sections. Elmo Langley won the exhibition event featuring retired NASCAR champions and stars.

- Segment 1: 50 laps
- Segment 2: 20 laps

70 laps — 30 laps, 30 laps, 10 green flag laps (1992–1997)

The race was moved up one day to Saturday night, and it moved to live coverage on The Nashville Network. The Winston revived the controversial 10-lap shootout, and the Winston Open went to a short 30-lap format. The 1992 race marked the first superspeedway race held under-the-lights, and resulted in a spectacular finish. Davey Allison and Kyle Petty battled on the last lap, and crashing crossing the finish line. Allison won the race, but spent the evening in the hospital rather than victory lane.

Starting in 1992, former NASCAR Champions were automatically invited to the race.

The 1994 race was the only running won by a tire brand (Hoosier) other than Goodyear, as Geoff Bodine held off Sterling Marlin and Ken Schrader. The event's second segment saw numerous crashes, notably when Ernie Irvan wrecked coming to the yellow to end the second segment.

The 1995 race featured Dale Earnhardt's trend-setting special paint scheme car. In 1997, Jeff Gordon won with the "T-Rex" car, nicknamed after its Jurassic Park: The Ride paint scheme. Due to its dominance in the race, NASCAR banned the car from further competition.

After Michael Waltrip's win by being the last car to transfer from the Winston Open, NASCAR changed the procedure by reverting to a format featuring the 1996 and 1997 race winning drivers and owners, and then adding the preceding year's race winning drivers not yet in the field until the field reached 19, and then the winner of the Winston Open. If the number added to the previous year was over 19, then all drivers who won races that year would be in the field.

- Segment 1: 30 laps / full inversion
- Segment 2: 30 laps
- Segment 3: 10 green flag laps (no caution laps count)

70 green flag laps — 30 laps, 30 laps, 10 laps (1998–2001)

The race remained at its 70 lap format, but for 1998, only green flag laps would count in any segment, not just the third segment.

The second ten-minute break was eliminated and replaced with caution laps, and cars would have the option of pitting for tires and fuel, at the expense of losing track position.

The inversion is changed to a random draw between 3 and 12 cars for the inversion after the first segment.

In 1998, qualifying for the Winston Open was changed. Previously it was accomplished with one-lap qualifying runs. From 1998 to 2000, the No Bull 25 Shootout twin races determined the lineups. Practice speeds (odd/even) from earlier in the day set the field for two 25-lap sprint races. The finish order for the first 25 set the odd positions for the Winston Open, and the finish order for the second 25 set the even positions for the Winston Open. In 2001, the Winston Open reverted to single-car qualifying, best of two laps.

In 2000–2002, immediately following the Winston Open, a 16-lap "No Bull 5 Sprint" last-chance race was added. The winner of the sprint race would also advance to the Winston.

In 2001, television coverage moved to FX as part of the new NASCAR television contract, and qualifying was changed so the pit stop took place at the start of the qualifying, and the stop was a four-tire change instead of two.

Starting in 2001, crew members were introduced together with drivers during the driver introduction ceremonies, with Fox broadcasters Chris Myers and Jeff Hammond interviewing selected persons during the ceremony.

- Segment 1: 30 green flag laps (no caution laps count)
- Segment 2: 30 green flag laps (no caution laps count) / pit stops optional (cars lose track position if they pit)
- Segment 3: 10 green flag laps (no caution laps count)

90 laps — 40 laps, 30 laps, 20 green flag laps — with elimination (2002–2003)

The popularity of the reality show Survivor influenced the Winston to make changes to the format in 2002, adding a new elimination format ("Survival of the Fastest"), and the final segment returned to 20 laps to make tire wear an issue.

Only race winning drivers and owners from 2001 would be in the field, and all former Cup titleholders and the past five winners of the Winston would be added to the field, plus the winner of the qualifying races.

The No Bull Sprint was eliminated after 2002, and for 2003, the Winston Open would become a 20-lap race with pit stops, and then a 10 green flag lap sprint after pit stops.

If the caution flag waved on Lap 40 of the first segment, two green flag laps or the next yellow flag would be run to finish the segment.

In the Winston, only the top 20 cars advanced to the second segment, and 10 cars (in 2002) or 14 cars (in 2003 planned, but was 12 after crashes) advanced to the third segment.

A green flag pit stop for four tires was mandatory in the first segment, but after Frank Stoddard beat the system in 2002 by changing four tires on the car driven by Jeff Burton just feet from the finish line on the last lap, the rule was changed to mandating tire stops at a specific point in the race.

Also, the inversion is moved to the final 20 lap sprint, and the ten-minute break is restored between the second and final segment.

- Segment 1: 40 laps / must take a four-tire pit stop during race (in 2003, must be between laps 10–30) / only top 20 cars advance
- Segment 2: 30 laps / only 14 cars (2003) / 10 cars (2002) advance / full field inversion at end of segment
- Segment 3: 20 green flag laps (no caution laps count)

90 laps — 40 laps, 30 laps, 20 green flag laps (2004–2006)

When Nextel took over title series title sponsorship from RJ Reynolds in 2004, the race name was changed using the previous de facto "All-Star Race" moniker which newer fans had been using since FX began broadcasting ran the event live and as an RJR brand, conflicted with new the sponsorship, officially becoming The Nextel All-Star Challenge. The format was changed slightly while the race stayed at 90 laps.

The elimination was eliminated, 1998–2001 inversion and second segment to third segment break rules were restored, meaning a random inversion and an open pit road for the final break instead of a ten-minute break.

The four tire stop is now between laps 13 and 16.

- Segment 1: 40 laps / with random inversion (6–12) at end of segment / 10 minute break
- Segment 2: 30 laps / pit stops optional (cars lose track position if they pit)
- Segment 3: 20 green flag laps (no caution laps count)

80 laps — four 20-lap quarters (2007)

Starting with the 2007 race, held May 19, 2007, there were major changes.

Announced during the Media Tour in Charlotte on January 23, 2007, the annual Pit Crew Challenge, held May 16, 2007, at Charlotte Bobcats Arena, won by Ryan Newman's crew in 2007, not only gave each member of the crew $10,000 each, but gave the driver the first choice of pit box, instead of the usual post-qualifying selection. The unique three-lap qualifying (with a pit stop to change four tires) remained in place to determine the starting lineup, with $50,000 for the winner, $10,000 for second, and $5,000 for third, with the pit crew receiving half of the winner's share.

Three drivers from the Nextel Open event, a 40-lap race with two 20-lap segments, gained entry to the Challenge. The top two finishers of the Open plus the leading fan vote winner still on the lead lap joined the automatic entries from past decade's All-Star race winners and active Cup Champions, along with the winners of the previous year's and first eleven Nextel Cup races of the current season. Winners of those first eleven races in that season were also eligible for the following season's All-Star event. In addition, as part of NASCAR's new television agreements, coverage was moved from FX to Fox sibling network Speed. The race format also changed as well.

The main race was shortened to eighty laps with four twenty-lap segments (or "quarters" like in football or basketball; only green flag laps will count in the final quarter). After the first segment, a five-lap caution period starts and there is an opportunity for drivers to take an optional pit stop. After the second segment, there is a ten-minute "halftime" break so pit crews can make adjustments. Unlike past events though, there is no inversion of the field. Finally, after the third segment, there is a five lap caution period so team can make a required pit stop (for work on their cars or a "stop and go" akin to a speeding penalty on pit row) for all teams which will determine the running order before the Dash for Cash, namely the $1 million (US) grand prize.

- First quarter: 20 laps / optional pit stop during five-lap caution period. $75,000 for the winner, $20,000 for second, and $10,000 for third.
- Second quarter: 20 laps / ten-minute "halftime" break to make adjustments; no inversion of the field. $75,000 for the winner, $20,000 for second, and $10,000 for third.
- Third quarter: 20 laps / mandatory pit stop (or "stop and go" in 2007) during five-lap caution period
- Fourth quarter: 20 green flag laps

100 laps — four 25-lap quarters (2008)

The changes to Sprint All-Star Race XXIV from XXIII was not only the name change with Roman numerals akin to the Super Bowl, and the first All-Star Race utilizing the Car of Tomorrow template, but also an expansion of the race by 25%. Each quarter now had five more laps to race, which changes the complexion of each segment, as tire wear will become a greater factor as well as fuel mileage would become more of an issue throughout the race. The 2007 race with its 20-lap segments was treated more of a sprint race; the 2008 race with 25-lap segments means a car will use nearly one-half tank of fuel and cycle the tires through one half of a tire run.

It also changed the final pit stop as all cars must pit for fuel and tires since a stop and go during the mandatory pit stop will virtually be impossible because it would be very close to the limit (about 55–60 laps) for fuel, and tire wear became an issue as cars are set up for a fairly long run.

The qualifying race also featured a name change, to the Sprint Showdown (the qualifier reverted to the "Open" name with the Monster Energy sponsorship in 2017). All prize money remained unchanged for that year's race.

100 laps — 50 laps, 20 laps, 20 laps, 10 green flag laps (2009–2011)

For the 25th anniversary of the race, two of the more popular elements of the classic format returned for this special edition.

The first segment became a 50-lap quarter, with a mandatory pit stop taking place in Lap 25 of the segment, the pit stop must be a four-tire Stop and take place during a green flag condition. Following the first two segments, cars will have the option of pitting, but they will lose track position should they do so.

The second and third segments were twenty laps each, returning to the 2007 format. Following the end of the third segment, a ten-minute break took place, allowing for adjustment of cars preceding the final segment, a ten-green flag lap shootout. The popularity of the double-file restarts throughout the race led NASCAR to adopt the rule for the second half of the 2009 season.

- Segment 1: 50 laps with a 4 tire pit stop on lap 25
- Segment 2: 20 laps/optional pit stops during the caution
- Segment 3: 20 laps followed by a ten-minute break for adjustments/mandatory 4 tire stop during caution
- Segment 4: 10 laps in a Dash for Cash (no caution laps count)

90 laps — four segments of 20 laps, then 10 green flag laps (2012–2014)

The 28th running (2012) came with a slight twist to the format.

For the first time in the race's history, there were five segments run in the race, four of them for 20 laps and concluding with a 10-lap sprint. The format was changed to provide additional incentive to win one of the first four segments, as the four segment winners will line up 1–4 to start the mandatory pit stop with the rest of the field lined up according to how they finished segment 4. Otherwise, the format, including eligibility criteria, remained unchanged. After winning the first segment in 2012 Jimmie Johnson intentionally rode in the back for the next three segments. Matt Kenseth and Brad Keselowski did the same after winning Segments 2 and 3 respectively. Criticism to this practice resulted in the final segment pit stop changed from Segment winners to the drivers with the best average finish in Segments 1–4. The same year the pit stop was made for a mandatory 4-tire change. Track owner Bruton Smith promised a bonus million dollars if a driver could win all five segments. This has not been achieved yet.

In 2014, NASCAR changed qualifying from a single car two-lap run to a group qualifying effort with two (on short tracks and road courses) or three (On bigger tracks) rounds. All-Star Race qualifying remained the same. The Showdown was moved to Friday as well as the Fan Vote announcement so they can compete for practice and qualifying.

110 laps — four segments of 25 laps, then 10 green flag laps (2015)

In 2015, NASCAR made a slight modification to the All-Star Race. The ten-year rule for former Series and All-Star Race champions was replaced with a rule allowing a full-time driver who has won either to have a "lifetime" exemption provided they race full-time. Also, for the Showdown, the "No Bull Sprint" format returned. The first segment was 20 laps, then the winner advanced to the All-Star Race. The second segment was 20 laps in which only green flag laps counted, that winner advanced. The winners joined the Fan Vote winner, Danica Patrick.

The 5 segment format from 2012 to 2014 was kept with 5 laps added to each segment for the All-Star Race, making each segment 25 laps. After the first four segments, drivers were lined up to enter pit road based on their average finish over the course of the first four segments. All drivers entered pit road for a mandatory 4-tire change before the final 10 lap segment in which only green flag laps counted.

113 laps — two segments of 50 laps, then 13 green flag laps (2016)

Known as the "Brad Keselowski Rule" for the driver whose idea it was designed, the race would return, in its 30th year as a multi-segment race, to a three-segment format. The first two segments were to be 50 laps, which would effectively require a pit stop in each segment (cars can make 50-55 laps per green flag run). The pit stop had to be performed under green flag conditions and a two (or more) tire change is required. During the second segment, the stop had to be before lap 35.

At the end of the first segment, a minimum of two tires were required to be changed during the pit stop. Following the end of the second segment, a random draw determined whether nine, ten, or eleven cars would be forced conduct a four-tire pit stop. Those cars were required to line up behind the cars that did not pit. Cars below that mark could pit but had to line up after the cars that made a mandatory pit stop.

Keselowski said the thirteen green flag lap segment was set because the NASCAR Drivers Council considered factors regarding pit stops and how many laps it would take to come back to the front, which would be around 10-15 laps, so 13 was chosen.

The Showdown and fan vote also changed for 2016. In addition to the old "No Bull Sprint" format, a third segment of ten laps was added. A two tire stop was required between segments. The winner of each Showdown segment advanced to the All-Star Race, and skips the remaining two segments.

The fan vote allowed two drivers to transfer the main event. Originally scheduled for one driver voted by the fan vote, the rules called for a second in 2016 because of a quirk in the eligibility. There were 16 drivers eligible for the All-Star Race, so the rules were designed so the three Showdown winners and the fan vote winner would make it 20. With Jeff Gordon, eligible by the November 2015 Martinsville win, retired, the runner-up in the fan vote was chosen to advance. If special circumstances warranted the withdrawal of another eligible driver, the third (and subsequent) placed driver in the fan vote would have also advanced.

=== Trophy ===
When the race was at North Wilkesboro Speedway in 2023, the All-Star trophy became a replica of a moonshine still, honoring the sport's bootlegging roots.

== All-Star Race ==
NASCAR All-Star Race

NASCAR Cup Series
- Venue: North Wilkesboro Speedway (2023–2025, 2027); Dover Motor Speedway (2026); Texas Motor Speedway (2021–2022); Bristol Motor Speedway (2020); Charlotte Motor Speedway (1985, 1987–2019); Atlanta Motor Speedway (1986)
- Location: North Wilkesboro, North Carolina, United States (2023–2025, 2027); Dover, Delaware, United States (2026); Fort Worth, Texas, United States (2021–2022); Bristol, Tennessee, United States (2020); Concord, North Carolina, United States (1985, 1987–2019); Hampton, Georgia, United States (1986)
- First race: 1985
- Previous names: The Winston (1985–1993, 1997–2003); The Winston Select (1994–1996); Nextel All-Star Challenge (2004–2007); Sprint All-Star Race (2008–2016); Monster Energy NASCAR All-Star Race (2017–2019)
- Most wins (driver): Jimmie Johnson (4)
- Most wins (team): Hendrick Motorsports (11)
- Most wins (manufacturer): Chevrolet (21)

Circuit information
- Surface: Asphalt
- Length: 0.625 mi (1.006 km)
- Turns: 4

The NASCAR All-Star Race is an annual non-championship stock car exhibition race between race winners from the previous season and the beginning of the current season, as well as all past event winners, and previous NASCAR Cup Series champions who attempted to run the entire previous season.

Other ways to become eligible to race in the event are by getting first or second place the All-Star Open (a race for drivers not eligible for the main event), or by winning the fan vote.

=== Past pole winners ===
Starting in 1989, pole qualifying for race changed. During the three-lap run, teams are required to perform a four-tire pit stop on either the first or second lap.

- 1985 – Terry Labonte
- 1986 – Darrell Waltrip
- 1987 – Bill Elliott
- 1988 – Darrell Waltrip
- 1989 – Terry Labonte
- 1990 – Dale Earnhardt
- 1991 – Davey Allison
- 1992 – Davey Allison
- 1993 – Ernie Irvan
- 1994 – Rusty Wallace
- 1995 – Bobby Labonte
- 1996 – Jeff Gordon
- 1997 – Bill Elliott
- 1998 – Bill Elliott
- 1999 – Bobby Labonte
- 2000 – Bill Elliott
- 2001 – Rusty Wallace
- 2002 – Matt Kenseth
- 2003 – Bill Elliott
- 2004 – Rusty Wallace
- 2005 – Ryan Newman
- 2006 – Kasey Kahne
- 2007 – Matt Kenseth
- 2008 – Kyle Busch
- 2009 – Jimmie Johnson
- 2010 – Kurt Busch
- 2011 – Kyle Busch
- 2012 – Kyle Busch
- 2013 – Carl Edwards
- 2014 – Carl Edwards
- 2015 – Denny Hamlin
- 2016 – Kevin Harvick
- 2017 – Kyle Larson
- 2018 – Matt Kenseth
- 2019 – Clint Bowyer
- 2020 – Martin Truex Jr.
- 2021 – Kyle Larson
- 2022 – Kyle Busch
- 2023 – Daniel Suárez
- 2024 – Joey Logano
- 2025 – Brad Keselowski
- 2026 – Denny Hamlin

==== Notes ====
- 2010: Qualifying rained out and set by the qualifying draw.
- 2016: Qualifying rained out and set by the owner points before the race.
- 2020–2021: Random draw.

=== Past winners ===
Year	Date	No.	Driver	Team	Manufacturer	Race distance		Race time	Average speed (mph)	Report	Ref
Year	Date	No.	Driver	Team	Manufacturer	Laps	Miles (km)	Race time	Average speed (mph)	Report	Ref
Charlotte Motor Speedway
1985	May 25	11	Darrell Waltrip	Junior Johnson & Associates	Chevrolet	70	105 (168.981)	0:40:32	161.184	Report	
Atlanta Motor Speedway
1986	May 11	9	Bill Elliott	Melling Racing	Ford	83	126.326 (203.301)	0:47:37	159.123	Report	
Charlotte Motor Speedway
1987	May 17	3	Dale Earnhardt	Richard Childress Racing	Chevrolet	135	202.5 (325.892)	1:19:24	153.023	Report	
1988	May 22	11	Terry Labonte	Junior Johnson & Associates	Chevrolet	135	202.5 (325.892)	1:27:16	139.228	Report	
1989	May 21	27	Rusty Wallace	Blue Max Racing	Pontiac	135	202.5 (325.892)	1:31:25	133.15	Report	
1990	May 20	3	Dale Earnhardt	Richard Childress Racing	Chevrolet	70	105 (168.981)	0:38:39	163.001	Report	
1991	May 19	28	Davey Allison	Robert Yates Racing	Ford	70	105 (168.981)	0:37:20	168.75	Report	
1992	May 16	28	Davey Allison	Robert Yates Racing	Ford	70	105 (168.981)	0:47:29	132.678	Report	
1993	May 22	3	Dale Earnhardt	Richard Childress Racing	Chevrolet	70	105 (168.981)	0:45:06	139.69	Report	
1994	May 21	7	Geoff Bodine	Geoff Bodine Racing	Ford	70	105 (168.981)	0:54:31	115.561	Report	
1995	May 20	24	Jeff Gordon	Hendrick Motorsports	Chevrolet	70	105 (168.981)	0:42:27	148.41	Report	
1996	May 18	21	Michael Waltrip	Wood Brothers Racing	Ford	70	105 (168.981)	0:38:43	162.721	Report	
1997	May 17	24	Jeff Gordon	Hendrick Motorsports	Chevrolet	70	105 (168.981)	0:39:54	157.895	Report	
1998	May 16	6	Mark Martin	Roush Racing	Ford	70	105 (168.981)	0:49:44	142.084	Report	
1999	May 22	5	Terry Labonte	Hendrick Motorsports	Chevrolet	70	105 (168.981)	0:34:20	183.495	Report	
2000	May 20	8	Dale Earnhardt Jr.	Dale Earnhardt, Inc.	Chevrolet	70	105 (168.981)	0:37:43	167.035	Report	
2001	May 19–20*	24	Jeff Gordon	Hendrick Motorsports	Chevrolet	70	105 (168.981)	0:34:03	185.022	Report	
2002	May 18	12	Ryan Newman	Penske Racing	Ford	90	135 (217.261)	1:13:38	110.005	Report	
2003	May 17	48	Jimmie Johnson	Hendrick Motorsports	Chevrolet	90	135 (217.261)	1:00:46	133.297	Report	
2004	May 22	17	Matt Kenseth	Roush Racing	Ford	90	135 (217.261)	1:28:09	91.889	Report	
2005	May 21	6	Mark Martin	Roush Racing	Ford	90	135 (217.261)	1:11:05	113.951	Report	
2006	May 20	48	Jimmie Johnson	Hendrick Motorsports	Chevrolet	90	135 (217.261)	1:18:25	103.29	Report	
2007	May 19	29	Kevin Harvick	Richard Childress Racing	Chevrolet	80	120 (193.121)	1:20:49	89.091	Report	
2008	May 17	9	Kasey Kahne	Gillett Evernham Motorsports	Dodge	100	150 (241.401)	1:08:38	120.113	Report	
2009	May 16	14	Tony Stewart	Stewart–Haas Racing	Chevrolet	100	150 (241.401)	1:30:47	156.809	Report	
2010	May 22	2	Kurt Busch	Penske Racing	Dodge	100	150 (241.401)	1:35:34	94.175	Report	
2011	May 21	99	Carl Edwards	Roush Fenway Racing	Ford	100	150 (241.401)	1:10:24	127.841	Report	
2012	May 19	48	Jimmie Johnson	Hendrick Motorsports	Chevrolet	90	135 (217.261)	1:28:00	92.045	Report	
2013	May 18	48	Jimmie Johnson	Hendrick Motorsports	Chevrolet	90	135 (217.261)	1:29:20	90.672	Report	
2014	May 17	1	Jamie McMurray	Chip Ganassi Racing	Chevrolet	90	135 (217.261)	1:20:35	100.517	Report	
2015	May 16	11	Denny Hamlin	Joe Gibbs Racing	Toyota	110	165 (265.542)	1:33:00	106.452	Report	
2016	May 21	22	Joey Logano	Team Penske	Ford	113	169.5 (272.783)	1:43:40	98.103	Report	
2017	May 20	18	Kyle Busch	Joe Gibbs Racing	Toyota	70	105 (168.981)	1:12:47	86.558	Report	
2018	May 19	4	Kevin Harvick	Stewart–Haas Racing	Ford	93*	139.5 (224.503)	1:38:50	84.688	Report	
2019	May 18	42	Kyle Larson	Chip Ganassi Racing	Chevrolet	88*	132 (212.433)	1:36:18	77.439	Report	
Bristol Motor Speedway
2020	July 15*	9	Chase Elliott	Hendrick Motorsports	Chevrolet	140	74.62 (120.089)	1:08:10	65.68	Report	
Texas Motor Speedway
2021	June 13	5	Kyle Larson	Hendrick Motorsports	Chevrolet	100	150 (241.401)	1:45:59	84.919	Report	
2022	May 22	12	Ryan Blaney	Team Penske	Ford	140*	210 (337.961)	2:02:47	102.62	Report	
North Wilkesboro Speedway
2023	May 21	5	Kyle Larson	Hendrick Motorsports	Chevrolet	200	125 (201.168)	1:20:59	92.612	Report	
2024	May 19	22	Joey Logano	Team Penske	Ford	200	125 (201.168)	1:19:57	93.809	Report	
2025	May 18	20	Christopher Bell	Joe Gibbs Racing	Toyota	250	156 (251.057)	1:37:56	95.728	Report	
Dover Motor Speedway
2026	May 17	11	Denny Hamlin	Joe Gibbs Racing	Toyota	350	350 (563.27)	1:33:51	127.864	Report	
North Wilkesboro Speedway
2027	May 23									Report	

- 2001: Race started on May 19 but ended early morning May 20 due to rain delay.
- 2018, 2019, 2022: Race ran extra laps due to overtime on a segment.
- 2020: Race postponed from May 16 to July 15 and moved to Bristol Motor Speedway due to the COVID-19 pandemic.

=== Multiple winners (drivers) ===
# wins	Driver	Years won
4	Jimmie Johnson	2003, 2006, 2012, 2013
3	Dale Earnhardt	1987, 1990, 1993
3	Jeff Gordon	1995, 1997, 2001
3	Kyle Larson	2019, 2021, 2023
2	Davey Allison	1991, 1992
2	Terry Labonte	1988, 1999
2	Mark Martin	1998, 2005
2	Kevin Harvick	2007, 2018
2	Joey Logano	2016, 2024
2	Denny Hamlin	2015, 2026

=== Multiple winners (teams) ===
# wins	Team	Years won
11	Hendrick Motorsports	1995, 1997, 1999, 2001, 2003, 2006, 2012, 2013, 2020, 2021, 2023
5	Team Penske	2002, 2010, 2016, 2022, 2024
4	Richard Childress Racing	1987, 1990, 1993, 2007
4	Roush Fenway Racing	1998, 2004, 2005, 2011
4	Joe Gibbs Racing	2015, 2017, 2025, 2026
2	Junior Johnson & Associates	1985, 1988
2	Robert Yates Racing	1991, 1992
2	Stewart–Haas Racing	2009, 2018
2	Chip Ganassi Racing	2014, 2019

=== Manufacturer wins ===
# wins	Manufacturer	Years won
21	Chevrolet	1985, 1987, 1988, 1990, 1993, 1995, 1997, 1999–2001, 2003, 2006, 2007, 2009, 2012–2014, 2019–2021, 2023
14	Ford	1986, 1991, 1992, 1994, 1996, 1998, 2002, 2004, 2005, 2011, 2016, 2018, 2022, 2024
4	Toyota	2015, 2017, 2025, 2026
2	Dodge	2008, 2010
1	Pontiac	1989

== All-Star Open ==
NASCAR All-Star Open

NASCAR Cup Series
- Venue: North Wilkesboro Speedway (2023–2025); Texas Motor Speedway (2021–2022); Bristol Motor Speedway (2020); Charlotte Motor Speedway (1985, 1987–2019); Atlanta Motor Speedway (1986)
- Location: North Wilkesboro, North Carolina, United States (2023–2025); Fort Worth, Texas, United States (2021–2022); Bristol, Tennessee, United States (2020); Concord, North Carolina, United States (1987–2019); Hampton, Georgia, United States (1986)
- First race: 1986
- Last race: 2025
- Distance: 62.500 mi (100.584 km)
- Laps: 100
- Most wins (driver): Sterling Marlin (4)
- Most wins (team): Hendrick Motorsports (5)
- Most wins (manufacturer): Chevrolet (13)

Circuit information
- Surface: Asphalt
- Length: 0.625 mi (1.006 km)
- Turns: 4

The NASCAR All-Star Open was the annual non-championship stock car exhibition race between drivers who were not eligible for the main event.

=== Notes ===
- 1998–2000: Won first No Bull 25 qualifying sprint race.
- 2009–2010: Qualifying rained out and set by the qualifying draw.
- 2016: Qualifying rained out and set by the 2016 owner points standings before the showdown.
- 2018, 2024: Qualifying rained out and set by the owner points before the Open.
- 2020: Random draw.
- 2021: Set by owner points.

=== Past winners ===
Year	Date	No.	Driver	Team	Manufacturer	Race distance		Race time	Average speed (mph)	Ref
Year	Date	No.	Driver	Team	Manufacturer	Laps	Miles (km)	Race time	Average speed (mph)	Ref
1986	May 11	55	Benny Parsons	Leo Jackson Racing	Oldsmobile	100	152.2 (244.942)	0:57:31	157.358	
1987	May 17	88	Buddy Baker	Baker-Schiff Racing	Oldsmobile	100	150 (241.401)	1:12:06	124.826	
1988	May 22	44	Sterling Marlin	Hagan Racing	Oldsmobile	100	150 (241.401)	1:06:22	135.61	
1989	May 21	94	Sterling Marlin	Hagan Racing	Oldsmobile	100	150 (241.401)	1:03:42	140.919	
1990	May 20	66	Dick Trickle	Cale Yarborough Motorsports	Pontiac	134	201 (323.478)	1:24:22	142.919	
1991	May 19	30	Michael Waltrip	Bahari Racing	Pontiac	134	201 (323.478)	1:28:45	135.887	
1992	May 16	30	Michael Waltrip	Bahari Racing	Pontiac	50	75 (120.7)	0:32:35	138.12	
1993	May 22	8	Sterling Marlin	Stavola Brothers Racing	Ford	50	75 (120.7)	0:32:15	139.535	
1994	May 21	24	Jeff Gordon	Hendrick Motorsports	Chevrolet	50	75 (120.7)	0:34:31	130.372	
1995	May 22	75	Todd Bodine	Butch Mock Motorsports	Ford	50	75 (120.7)	0:37:35	119.734	
1996	May 20	23	Jimmy Spencer	Travis Carter Enterprises	Ford	50	75 (120.7)	0:29:03	154.905	
1997	May 17	25	Ricky Craven	Hendrick Motorsports	Chevrolet	50	75 (120.7)	0:26:02	172.855	
1998	May 16	12	Jeremy Mayfield	Penske Racing	Ford	50	75 (120.7)	0:32:01	140.552	
1999	May 22	20	Tony Stewart	Joe Gibbs Racing	Pontiac	50	75 (120.7)	0:33:19	135.064	
2000	May 20	1	Steve Park	Dale Earnhardt, Inc.	Chevrolet	30	45 (72.42)	0:31:52	172.916	
2001	May 19	10	Johnny Benson	MB2 Motorsports	Pontiac	30	45 (72.42)	0:23:21	181.257	
2002	May 18	19	Jeremy Mayfield	Evernham Motorsports	Dodge	30	45 (72.42)	0:18:13	148.216	
2003	May 17	99	Jeff Burton	Roush Racing	Ford	30	45 (72.42)	0:32:23	83.381	
2004	May 22	40	Sterling Marlin	Chip Ganassi Racing	Dodge	30	45 (72.42)	0:36:48	73.37	
2005	May 21	25	Brian Vickers	Hendrick Motorsports	Chevrolet	30	45 (72.42)	0:28:13	95.688	
2006	May 20	10	Scott Riggs	Evernham Motorsports	Dodge	30	45 (72.42)	0:28:11	95.801	
2007	May 19	1	Martin Truex Jr.	Dale Earnhardt, Inc.	Chevrolet	40	60 (96.56)	0:45:32	79.063	
2008	May 17	84	A. J. Allmendinger	Red Bull Racing Team	Toyota	40	60 (96.56)	0:40:33	88.779	
2009	May 16	77	Sam Hornish Jr.	Penske Racing	Dodge	40	60 (96.56)	0:43:16	83.205	
2010	May 22	56	Martin Truex Jr.	Michael Waltrip Racing	Toyota	40	60 (96.56)	0:34:45	103.597	
2011	May 21	6	David Ragan	Roush Fenway Racing	Ford	40	60 (96.56)	0:42:42	100.57	
2012	May 19	88	Dale Earnhardt Jr.	Hendrick Motorsports	Chevrolet	40	60 (96.56)	0:28:40	125.581	
2013	May 18	1	Jamie McMurray	Earnhardt Ganassi Racing	Chevrolet	40	60 (96.56)	0:26:03	138.196	
2014	May 16	15	Clint Bowyer	Michael Waltrip Racing	Toyota	40	60 (96.56)	0:30:35	117.711	
2015	May 15	15	Clint Bowyer	Michael Waltrip Racing	Toyota	40	60 (96.56)	0:35:10	102.37	
2016	May 21*	42	Kyle Larson	Chip Ganassi Racing	Chevrolet	50	75 (120.701)	0:54:16	82.924	
2017	May 20	19	Daniel Suárez	Joe Gibbs Racing	Toyota	50	75 (120.701)	1:00:19	74.606	
2018	May 19	47	A. J. Allmendinger	JTG Daugherty Racing	Chevrolet	50	75 (120.701)	0:45:35	98.72	
2019	May 18	42	Kyle Larson	Chip Ganassi Racing	Chevrolet	62*	93 (149.669)	1:00:44	91.877	
2020	July 15	21	Matt DiBenedetto	Wood Brothers Racing	Ford	85	45.305 (72.911)	0:47:22	57.388	
2021	June 13	10	Aric Almirola	Stewart–Haas Racing	Ford	50	75 (120.701)	0:47:32	94.67	
2022	May 22	99	Daniel Suárez	Trackhouse Racing Team	Chevrolet	50	75 (120.701)	0:54:32	82.518	
2023	May 21	48	Josh Berry	Hendrick Motorsports	Chevrolet	100	62.5 (100.584)	0:46:48	80.128	
2024	May 19	54	Ty Gibbs	Joe Gibbs Racing	Toyota	100	62.5 (100.584)	0:37:59	98.728	
2025	May 18	77	Carson Hocevar	Spire Motorsports	Chevrolet	100	62.5 (100.584)	0:38:06	98.425	

- 2016: Race postponed from Friday, May 20 to Saturday, May 21 because of inclement weather.
- 2019: Race ran extra laps due to overtime on two segments.
- 2020: Race postponed from May 16 to July 15 due to the COVID-19 pandemic.

=== Multiple winners (drivers) ===
# wins	Driver	Years won
4	Sterling Marlin	1988, 1989, 1993, 2004
3	Dale Earnhardt	1987, 1990, 1993
3	Jeff Gordon	1995, 1997, 2001
2	Michael Waltrip	1991, 1992
2	Jeremy Mayfield	1998, 2002
2	Martin Truex Jr.	2007, 2010
2	A. J. Allmendinger	2008, 2018
2	Clint Bowyer	2014, 2015
2	Kyle Larson	2016, 2019
2	Daniel Suárez	2017, 2022

=== Multiple winners (teams) ===
# wins	Team	Years won
5	Hendrick Motorsports	1994, 1997, 2005, 2012, 2023
2	Hagan Racing	1988, 1989
2	Bahari Racing	1991, 1992
2	Roush Fenway Racing	2003, 2011
2	Chip Ganassi Racing	2016, 2019
2	Joe Gibbs Racing	2017, 2024

=== Manufacturer wins ===
# wins	Manufacturer	Years won
13	Chevrolet	1994, 1997, 2000, 2005, 2007, 2012–2013, 2016, 2018–2019, 2022–2023, 2025
8	Ford	1993, 1995–1996, 1998, 2003, 2011, 2020–2021
6	Toyota	2008, 2010, 2014–2015, 2017, 2024
5	Pontiac	1990–1992, 1999, 2001
4	Oldsmobile	1986–1989
4	Dodge	2002, 2004, 2006, 2009

== Fan vote ==
In 2004, NASCAR started the Fan Vote.

=== Past winners ===
Year	No.	Driver	Team	Manufacturer
2004	49	Ken Schrader	BAM Racing	Dodge
2005	1	Martin Truex Jr.	Dale Earnhardt, Inc.	Chevrolet
2006	45	Kyle Petty	Petty Enterprises	Dodge
2007	78	Kenny Wallace	Furniture Row Racing	Chevrolet
2008	9	Kasey Kahne	Gillett Evernham Motorsports	Dodge
2009	20	Joey Logano	Joe Gibbs Racing	Toyota
2010	99	Carl Edwards	Roush Fenway Racing	Ford
2011	88	Dale Earnhardt Jr.	Hendrick Motorsports	Chevrolet
2012	47	Bobby Labonte	JTG Daugherty Racing	Toyota
2013	10	Danica Patrick	Stewart–Haas Racing	Chevrolet
2014	98	Josh Wise	Phil Parsons Racing	Chevrolet
2015	10	Danica Patrick	Stewart–Haas Racing	Chevrolet
2016	24	Chase Elliott	Hendrick Motorsports	Chevrolet
2017	24	Chase Elliott	Hendrick Motorsports	Chevrolet
2018	9	Chase Elliott	Hendrick Motorsports	Chevrolet
2019	88	Alex Bowman	Hendrick Motorsports	Chevrolet
2020	14	Clint Bowyer	Stewart–Haas Racing	Ford
2021	21	Matt DiBenedetto	Wood Brothers Racing	Ford
2022	43	Erik Jones	Petty GMS Motorsports	Chevrolet
2023	42	Noah Gragson	Legacy Motor Club	Chevrolet
2024	10	Noah Gragson	Stewart–Haas Racing	Ford
2025	4	Noah Gragson	Front Row Motorsports	Ford
2026	7	Daniel Suárez	Spire Motorsports	Chevrolet

=== Multiple fan vote wins (drivers) ===
Wins	Driver	Years won
3	Chase Elliott	2016–2018
3	Noah Gragson	2023–2025
2	Danica Patrick	2013, 2015

=== Multiple fan vote wins (teams) ===
Wins	Driver	Years won
5	Hendrick Motorsports	2011, 2016–2019
4	Stewart–Haas Racing	2013, 2015, 2020, 2024

=== Multiple fan vote wins (manufacturers) ===
Wins	Driver	Years won
13	Chevrolet	2005, 2007, 2011, 2013–2019, 2022–2023, 2026
5	Ford	2010, 2020, 2021, 2024, 2025
3	Dodge	2004, 2006, 2008
2	Toyota	2009, 2012

== No Bull Sprint ==
No Bull Sprint

NASCAR Cup Series
- Venue: Charlotte Motor Speedway
- Location: Concord, North Carolina, United States
- First race: 2000
- Last race: 2002
- Distance: 24 mi (38.624 km)
- Laps: 16
- Most wins (manufacturer): Ford (2)

Circuit information
- Surface: Asphalt
- Length: 1.5 mi (2.4 km)
- Turns: 4

All races were held at Charlotte Motor Speedway.

=== Past winners ===
Year	Date	No.	Driver	Team	Manufacturer	Race distance		Race time	Average speed (mph)	Ref
Year	Date	No.	Driver	Team	Manufacturer	Laps	Miles (km)	Race time	Average speed (mph)	Ref
2000	May 20	25	Jerry Nadeau	Hendrick Motorsports	Chevrolet	16	24 (38.628)	0:16:37	179.856	
2001	May 19	66	Todd Bodine	Travis Carter Motorsports	Ford	16	24 (38.628)	0:13:24	N/A	
2002	May 18	12	Ryan Newman	Penske Racing	Ford	16	24 (38.628)	0:08:04	178.512	

== No Bull 25 Shootout ==
No Bull 25 Shootout

NASCAR Cup Series
- Venue: Charlotte Motor Speedway
- Location: Concord, North Carolina, United States
- First race: 1998
- Last race: 2000
- Distance: 37.5 mi (60.350 km)
- Laps: 25
- Most wins (driver): Jimmy Spencer (2)
- Most wins (team): Travis Carter Motorsports (2)
- Most wins (manufacturer): Ford (3)

Circuit information
- Surface: Asphalt
- Length: 1.5 mi (2.4 km)
- Turns: 4

Twin 25-lap races to determine the starting grid for the Winston Open. The starting lineups of the shootouts were based on practice speeds earlier in the day. In 2001, the starting grid for the Winston Open reverted to two-lap qualifying.

All races were held at Charlotte Motor Speedway.

=== Past winners ===
Year	Date	No.	Driver	Team	Manufacturer	Race distance		Average speed (mph)	Ref
Year	Date	No.	Driver	Team	Manufacturer	Laps	Miles	Average speed (mph)	Ref
1998	May 16	12	Jeremy Mayfield	Penske Racing	Ford	25	37.5 (60.35)		
1998	May 16	23	Jimmy Spencer	Travis Carter Motorsports	Ford	25	37.5 (60.35)		
1999	May 22	31	Mike Skinner	Richard Childress Racing	Chevrolet	25	37.5 (60.35)	171.826	
1999	May 22	20	Tony Stewart	Joe Gibbs Racing	Pontiac	25	37.5 (60.35)	173.41	
2000	May 20	25	Jerry Nadeau	Hendrick Motorsports	Chevrolet	25	37.5 (60.35)	167.379	
2000	May 20	26	Jimmy Spencer	Travis Carter Motorsports	Ford	25	37.5 (60.35)	171.886	

== Race notes ==
- Keith Jackson, much better known for his work on college football and ABC's Wide World of Sports, called the 1987 event, known for the "Pass in the Grass". He was the network's NASCAR play-by-play announcer until the 1987 season.
- From 1987 to 1990, ABC Sports covered reports on time trials on the Indianapolis 500 which ABC Sports covered.
- The 1992 race was the first held on a superspeedway at night.
- After the 2000 race, a pedestrian bridge collapsed outside one of the entrances to Lowe's Motor Speedway. Over 100 spectators were injured, some of them critically. Lawsuits related to the incident were heard in courts as late as 2007.
- Trent Cherry, a member of the No. 12 Penske Racing Dodge crew, did a mosh pit dance into an infield crowd prior to the 2005 race. The all-star race introductions since 2001 have included pit crew members, which has led to antics increasing between crew members as they are introduced in front of the crowd.
- In 2006, the Red Hot Chili Peppers performed a concert between segments 2 and 3. Among the celebrities that have given the command have included Pamela Anderson (2005) and Michael Jordan (2007).
- Since 2005, NASCAR Day has been held the day before this race. NASCAR Day is a charity event that benefits the NASCAR Foundation. The foundation in turn funnels money to charities supported by drivers and team owners.
- The NASCAR Hall of Fame induction ceremonies were held as part of Sprint All-Star Race XXVI week, which took shortly after the opening of the Hall.

== See also ==
- Pit Crew Challenge

== Notes ==
Previous race: Ecosave 400	NASCAR Cup Series; All-Star Race	Next race: Coca-Cola 600
