= 2013 NASCAR Sprint All-Star Race =

29th iteration of the NASCAR All-Star Race

- Race details
Date	May 18, 2013
Location	Charlotte Motor Speedway in Concord, North Carolina
Course	Permanent racing facility 1.5 mi (2.4 km)
Distance	Showdown: 40 laps, 60 mi (96.56 km); All-Star Race: 90 laps, 135 mi (217.26 km)
Avg Speed	Showdown: 138.196 miles per hour (222.405 km/h); All-Star Race: 90.672 miles per hour (145.922 km/h)
- Sprint Showdown
Pole position	Martin Truex Jr. (Michael Waltrip Racing); 27.918 seconds
Winner	Jamie McMurray (Earnhardt Ganassi Racing)
- Sprint All-Star Race
Pole position	Carl Edwards (Roush Fenway Racing); 111.297 seconds
Showdown transfers	Jamie McMurray (Showdown winner); Ricky Stenhouse Jr. (Showdown runner-up); Danica Patrick (Fan vote)
Most laps led	Kurt Busch (Furniture Row Racing)/ Kyle Busch (Joe Gibbs Racing); 29 laps
Winner	Jimmie Johnson (Hendrick Motorsports)
- Television
Network	Speed
Announcers	Mike Joy, Darrell Waltrip, and Larry McReynolds

Logo for the 2013 NASCAR Sprint All-Star Race.

The 2013 NASCAR Sprint All-Star Race program cover, with artwork by Sam Bass. "Saddle Up, Race Fans!"

The 2013 NASCAR Sprint All-Star Race was a NASCAR Sprint Cup Series stock car race held on May 18, 2013, at Charlotte Motor Speedway in Concord, North Carolina. Contested over 90 laps, the it was the second exhibition race of the 2013 Sprint Cup Series season. Jimmie Johnson of Hendrick Motorsports took his record fourth All-Star Race victory, while Joey Logano finished second. Kyle Busch, Kasey Kahne, and Kurt Busch rounded out the top five.

== Report ==
=== Background ===
Charlotte Motor Speedway, the race track where the race was held.

The track, Charlotte Motor Speedway, is a four-turn quad-oval track that is 1.5 miles (2.4 km) long. The track's turns are banked at twenty-four degrees, while the front stretch, the location of the finish line, is five degrees. The back stretch, opposite of the front, also had a five degree banking. The racetrack has seats for 134,000 spectators.

A total of 23 drivers were entered for the Sprint Showdown, while 19 different drivers were eligible to participate in the All-Star Race, including race winners from last season through the 2013 Bojangles' Southern 500 at Darlington Raceway and previous All-Star race winners from the past 10 years. The drivers who finished first and second in the Sprint Showdown, a 40-lap preliminary race, were also eligible to compete in the race, as well as the Sprint fan vote winner. The race was 90 laps long, separated into five segments: four segments of 20 laps and a final segment of 10 laps. Following the fourth segment, drivers were repositioned by their average finish in the previous four segments to determine what position they would enter pit road. A mandatory four-tire pit stop was between the final two segments, while pitting between the 20 lap segments was optional.

=== Sprint Showdown ===
Martin Truex Jr. started on pole, but Jamie McMurray passed him in turn two on the first lap. McMurray led all 20 laps to win the first segment after holding off a mid-segment charge by Truex. Ricky Stenhouse Jr. finished the segment in third, followed by Juan Pablo Montoya and Paul Menard. During the competition caution between segments, Casey Mears stayed out as the rest of the field came to pit road. McMurray took two tires and restarted second. He quickly re-took the lead and pulled away from the field as Stenhouse and Truex (who took four tires) tried to catch up. Stenhouse slightly closed in on McMurray over the next few laps while Truex and Jeff Burton battled for third. McMurray once again led all 20 laps to win segment two and advance into the All-Star Race. Stenhouse finished in second to advance as well. Burton, Menard, Truex, and Montoya rounded out the top six. Danica Patrick, who finished ninth, won the fan vote to advance to the All-Star Race.

=== NASCAR Sprint All-Star Race ===
Carl Edwards started on pole and choose the outside lane, with Kurt Busch starting second. Busch took the lead from Edwards in turn three on lap one as Brad Keselowski had transmission failure at the end of lap two. The first caution flag waved on lap eight for a rain shower and 11 of the remaining 21 cars (including Mark Martin, Tony Stewart, Dale Earnhardt Jr., Danica Patrick, and Jimmie Johnson) made pit stops. The field ran under caution for five laps, until the red flag came out on lap 13 and the jet dryers were called onto the track. After a 41-minute red flag, the field took the restart on lap 16. Kurt Busch continued to lead and won the first 20-lap segment. He was followed by Kyle Busch, Clint Bowyer, Carl Edwards, and Kasey Kahne.

Following the caution, Kurt Busch took the green flag with Kyle Busch on his outside. Kyle quickly moved around Kurt in turn two, but Kurt came back alongside Kyle in turn three. This allowed Clint Bowyer to pass them both and pull away with the lead, while Kyle and Kurt settled in second and third, respectively. On lap 25, Ricky Stenhouse Jr. bounced off the frontstretch wall and into Mark Martin, who was sent spinning into the infield, to bring out the third caution. On the restart, Kyle Busch passed Bowyer for the lead in turn three. Busch led the next 12 laps to win the second segment, followed by Bowyer, Edwards, Kurt Busch, and Jimmie Johnson. During the caution, all drivers came down pit road, with the exception of Bowyer, Edwards, and Martin. On the restart, Bowyer continued to lead over Edwards and Kyle Busch. Edwards then quickly faded, leaving Busch in second and Johnson in third place. On lap 44, Kyle Busch passed Bowyer for the lead and pulled away, leaving Kurt Busch, Bowyer, Johnson, and Dale Earnhardt Jr. to battle for the second position. Bowyer then fell back, leaving Kurt Busch in second, Johnson in third, and Earnhardt in fourth. Kyle Busch would lead the last 17 laps of the third 20-lap segment to win the segment (his second segment win). He was followed by Kurt Busch, Johnson, Earnhardt, and Joey Logano. The whole field came onto pit road during the caution (with some taking two tires and others taking four) and Kasey Kahne rolled off of pit road first, followed by Kevin Harvick, Greg Biffle, Denny Hamlin, and Kyle Busch.

At the start of the fourth 20-lap segment, Harvick nosed ahead of Kahne, but Kahne was able to stay in front of Harvick and pull away. As a result of everyone shuffling on the restart, Kyle Busch fell back several positions but regained to sixth. The fifth caution waved on lap 65 for debris resulting from contact between Biffle and Earnhardt. Kahne led on the restart (lap 71), followed by Kurt Busch, Harvick, and Johnson. Busch passed Kahne for the lead on lap 72 and started to pull away as Kahne and Johnson battled for second. Busch led the last nine laps of segment four to win the segment (his second segment win), followed by Kahne, Johnson, Kyle Busch, and Matt Kenseth.

Due to a new stipulation, the field was shuffled in order of their average finishes in the first four segments before the mandatory pit stop. This put Kurt Busch, Kyle Busch, Kahne, Johnson, and Logano as the first five onto pit road. Kahne came out first, followed by Johnson, Kyle Busch, Logano, and Kurt Busch. On the restart, Kahne and Johnson ran side-by-side for two laps until Johnson finally cleared Kahne and moved away. Johnson sped away over the last eight laps to win his second All-Star Race in a row (becoming the only driver to win four All-Star races). Logano finished second, followed by Kyle Busch, Kahne, and Kurt Busch. Hamlin, Earnhardt, Jamie McMurray, Matt Kenseth, and Edwards rounded out the top ten.

== Results ==
=== Showdown qualifying ===
Grid	No.	Driver	Team	Manufacturer	Time	Speed
1	56	Martin Truex Jr.	Michael Waltrip Racing	Toyota	27.918	193.424
2	1	Jamie McMurray	Earnhardt Ganassi Racing	Chevrolet	28.023	192.699
3	42	Juan Pablo Montoya	Earnhardt Ganassi Racing	Chevrolet	28.075	192.342
4	17	Ricky Stenhouse Jr.	Roush Fenway Racing	Ford	28.084	192.280
5	13	Casey Mears	Germain Racing	Toyota	28.290	190.880
6	31	Jeff Burton	Richard Childress Racing	Chevrolet	28.398	190.154
7	10	Danica Patrick	Stewart–Haas Racing	Chevrolet	28.412	190.061
8	27	Paul Menard	Richard Childress Racing	Chevrolet	28.442	189.860
9	36	J. J. Yeley	Tommy Baldwin Racing	Chevrolet	28.504	189.447
10	33	Landon Cassill	Circle Sport	Chevrolet	28.577	188.963
11	47	Bobby Labonte	JTG Daugherty Racing	Toyota	28.599	188.818
12	43	Aric Almirola	Richard Petty Motorsports	Ford	28.612	188.732
13	44	Scott Riggs	Xxxtreme Motorsports	Ford	28.635	188.580
14	38	David Gilliland	Front Row Motorsports	Ford	28.695	188.186
15	95	Michael McDowell	Leavine Family Racing	Ford	28.770	187.696
16	83	David Reutimann	BK Racing	Toyota	28.810	187.435
17	19	Mike Bliss	Humphrey Smith Racing	Toyota	28.830	187.305
18	93	Travis Kvapil	BK Racing	Toyota	28.875	187.013
19	7	Dave Blaney	Tommy Baldwin Racing	Chevrolet	28.924	186.696
20	32	Timmy Hill	FAS Lane Racing	Ford	29.054	185.861
21	87	Joe Nemechek	NEMCO Motorsports	Toyota	29.346	184.011
22	30	David Stremme	Swan Racing	Toyota	29.385	183.767
23	52	Brian Keselowski	Brian Keselowski Motorsports	Toyota	29.759	181.458

=== Showdown results ===
Pos	Car	Driver	Team	Manufacturer	Laps Run
1	1	Jamie McMurray	Earnhardt Ganassi Racing	Chevrolet	40
2	17	Ricky Stenhouse Jr.	Roush Fenway Racing	Ford	40
3	31	Jeff Burton	Richard Childress Racing	Chevrolet	40
4	27	Paul Menard	Richard Childress Racing	Chevrolet	40
5	56	Martin Truex Jr.	Michael Waltrip Racing	Toyota	40
6	42	Juan Pablo Montoya	Earnhardt Ganassi Racing	Chevrolet	40
7	43	Aric Almirola	Richard Petty Motorsports	Ford	40
8	93	Travis Kvapil	BK Racing	Toyota	40
9	10	Danica Patrick	Stewart–Haas Racing	Chevrolet	40
10	13	Casey Mears	Germain Racing	Ford	40
11	83	David Reutimann	BK Racing	Toyota	40
12	47	Bobby Labonte	JTG Daugherty Racing	Toyota	40
13	38	David Gilliland	Front Row Motorsports	Ford	40
14	95	Michael McDowell	Leavine Family Racing	Ford	40
15	30	David Stremme	Swan Racing	Toyota	40
16	33	Landon Cassill	Circle Sport	Chevrolet	40
17	19	Mike Bliss	Humphrey Smith Racing	Toyota	40
18	87	Joe Nemechek	NEMCO Motorsports	Toyota	40
19	52	Brian Keselowski	Brian Keselowski Motorsports	Toyota	36
20	36	J. J. Yeley	Tommy Baldwin Racing	Chevrolet	27
21	7	Dave Blaney	Tommy Baldwin Racing	Chevrolet	24
22	44	Scott Riggs	Xxxtreme Motorsports	Ford	15
23	32	Timmy Hill	FAS Lane Racing	Ford	6

Key
Transferred to All-Star Race

=== All-Star Race qualifying ===
Grid	No.	Driver	Team	Manufacturer	Time
1	99	Carl Edwards	Roush Fenway Racing	Ford	1:11.297
2	88	Dale Earnhardt Jr.	Hendrick Motorsports	Chevrolet	1:12.190
3	78	Kurt Busch	Furniture Row Racing	Chevrolet	1:12.447
4	16	Greg Biffle	Roush Fenway Racing	Ford	1:12.706
5	18	Kyle Busch	Joe Gibbs Racing	Toyota	1:12.754
6	22	Joey Logano	Penske Racing	Ford	1:12.991
7	15	Clint Bowyer	Michael Waltrip Racing	Toyota	1:13.595
8	11	Denny Hamlin	Joe Gibbs Racing	Toyota	1:13.719
9	55	Mark Martin	Michael Waltrip Racing	Toyota	1:14.001
10	5	Kasey Kahne	Hendrick Motorsports	Chevrolet	1:14.032
11	24	Jeff Gordon	Hendrick Motorsports	Chevrolet	1:14.336
12	39	Ryan Newman	Stewart–Haas Racing	Chevrolet	1:14.716
13	2	Brad Keselowski	Penske Racing	Ford	1:14.989
14	20	Matt Kenseth	Joe Gibbs Racing	Toyota	1:15.051
15	14	Tony Stewart	Stewart–Haas Racing	Chevrolet	1:15.379
16	34	David Ragan	Front Row Motorsports	Ford	1:15.778
17	9	Marcos Ambrose	Richard Petty Motorsports	Ford	1:17.055
18	48	Jimmie Johnson	Hendrick Motorsports	Chevrolet	1:19.462
19	29	Kevin Harvick	Richard Childress Racing	Chevrolet	1:22.903

=== All-Star Race results ===
Pos	Car	Driver	Team	Manufacturer	Laps Run
1	48	Jimmie Johnson	Hendrick Motorsports	Chevrolet	90
2	22	Joey Logano	Penske Racing	Ford	90
3	18	Kyle Busch	Joe Gibbs Racing	Toyota	90
4	5	Kasey Kahne	Hendrick Motorsports	Chevrolet	90
5	78	Kurt Busch	Furniture Row Racing	Chevrolet	90
6	11	Denny Hamlin	Joe Gibbs Racing	Toyota	90
7	88	Dale Earnhardt Jr.	Hendrick Motorsports	Chevrolet	90
8	1	Jamie McMurray	Earnhardt Ganassi Racing	Chevrolet	90
9	20	Matt Kenseth	Joe Gibbs Racing	Toyota	90
10	99	Carl Edwards	Roush Fenway Racing	Ford	90
11	29	Kevin Harvick	Richard Childress Racing	Chevrolet	90
12	24	Jeff Gordon	Hendrick Motorsports	Chevrolet	90
13	39	Ryan Newman	Stewart–Haas Racing	Chevrolet	90
14	14	Tony Stewart	Stewart–Haas Racing	Chevrolet	90
15	16	Greg Biffle	Roush Fenway Racing	Ford	90
16	17	Ricky Stenhouse Jr.	Roush Fenway Racing	Ford	90
17	9	Marcos Ambrose	Richard Petty Motorsports	Ford	90
18	15	Clint Bowyer	Michael Waltrip Racing	Toyota	90
19	34	David Ragan	Front Row Motorsports	Ford	90
20	10	Danica Patrick	Stewart–Haas Racing	Chevrolet	90
21	55	Mark Martin	Michael Waltrip Racing	Toyota	87
22	2	Brad Keselowski	Penske Racing	Ford	2
