= 1985 The Winston =

Inaugural iteration of the NASCAR All-Star Race

Race details
- Race 2 of 2 exhibition races in the 1985 NASCAR Winston Cup Series
- Date: May 25, 1985
- Location: Concord, North Carolina
- Course: Charlotte Motor Speedway
- Course length: 1.5 miles (2.4 km)
- Distance: 70 laps, 105 mi (169 km)
- Weather: Temperatures around 64.8 °F (18.2 °C), with winds gusting to 11.1 miles per hour (17.9 km/h)
- Average speed: 161.184 mph (259.401 km/h)

Pole position
Driver	Terry Labonte	Hagan Racing

Most laps led
Driver	Harry Gant	Mach 1 Racing
- Laps: 31

Winner
No. 11	Darrell Waltrip	Junior Johnson & Associates

Television in the United States
- Network: Jefferson-Pilot
- Announcers: Mike Joy and Kyle Petty

The 1985 The Winston, the inaugural running of the NASCAR All-Star Race, was a stock car racing competition that took place on May 25, 1985. Held at Charlotte Motor Speedway in Concord, North Carolina, the 70-lap race was the second exhibition race in the 1985 NASCAR Winston Cup Series. Defending 1984 NASCAR Winston Cup Series Champion Terry Labonte of Hagan Racing was awarded the pole position while Darrell Waltrip of Junior Johnson & Associates won the race and US$200,000.

The race featured one two-tire pit stop between laps 30 and 40, and was held the day before the 1985 Coca-Cola World 600. Both Labonte and Harry Gant won a purse bonus of US$10,000 for leading the twentieth and fiftieth lap of the race.

== Background ==
Charlotte Motor Speedway, the track where the race was held.

The Winston was open to race winners from the 1984 season. The pole position was awarded to the defending Winston Cup champion while the rest of the field was determined by the total number of wins from last season, with driver's points used as the tiebreaker.

=== 1985 The Winston drivers and eligibility ===
==== Race winners in 1984 ====
- 3-Dale Earnhardt (2 wins)
- 5-Geoff Bodine (3 wins)
- 9-Bill Elliott (3 wins)
- 11-Darrell Waltrip (7 wins)
- 15-Ricky Rudd (1 win)
- 22-Bobby Allison (2 wins)
- 27-Tim Richmond (1 win)
- 28-Cale Yarborough (3 wins, including the 1984 Daytona 500)
- 33-Harry Gant (3 wins)
- 43-Richard Petty (2 wins)
- 44-Terry Labonte (2 wins, defending 1984 champion)
- 55-Benny Parsons (1 win)

== Race summary ==
The Winston was a 70-lap exhibition race with a combined purse of US$500,000. The earnings were as follows:

The Winston earnings
First place	US$200,000
Second place	US$75,000
Third place	US$50,000
Fourth place	US$40,000
Fifth place	US$30,000
Sixth place	US$15,000
Seventh place	US$13,000
Eighth place	US$12,500
Ninth place	US$12,000
Tenth place	US$11,500
Eleventh place	US$11,000
Twelfth place	US$10,000

In addition, a purse bonus of US$10,000 was given to the drivers who led laps 20 and 55.

Chevrolet Monte Carlo drivers Terry Labonte and Darrell Waltrip led the field on the green flag. Despite having an advantage in aerodynamics, the Ford Thunderbird drivers struggled to keep up with the Chevys, which were in the top five. By lap 8, Dale Earnhardt slipped out of the top five as Cale Yarborough and Bobby Allison passed him while Waltrip and Labonte battled for the lead. On lap 14, Geoff Bodine entered pit road and retired from the race due to engine failure, becoming the only DNF in the race. Labonte passed Waltrip on the start/finish line to lead lap 20 and earn US$10,000 before surrendering the lead back to Waltrip. Harry Gant caught up with Waltrip before the two-tire pit stops began on lap 30. By lap 38, Gant took the lead from Waltrip and earned US$10,000 for leading lap 50. Gant dominated the race by leading 31 laps, but Waltrip regained momentum and took back the lead on lap 69 to win the race and US$200,000 just before his engine expired.

== Race results ==
Pos	Grid	Car	Driver	Owner	Manufacturer	Laps run	Laps led
1	2	11	Darrell Waltrip	Junior Johnson & Associates	Chevrolet	70	27
2	3	33	Harry Gant	Mach 1 Racing	Chevrolet	70	31
3	1	44	Terry Labonte	Hagan Racing	Chevrolet	70	12
4	6	28	Cale Yarborough	Ranier-Lundy Racing	Ford	70	0
5	11	27	Tim Richmond	Blue Max Racing	Pontiac	70	0
6	8	22	Bobby Allison	DiGard Racing	Buick	70	0
7	4	9	Bill Elliott	Melling Racing	Ford	70	0
8	10	15	Ricky Rudd	Bud Moore Engineering	Ford	70	0
9	12	55	Benny Parsons	Jackson Brothers Motorsports	Chevrolet	70	0
10	7	3	Dale Earnhardt	Richard Childress Racing	Chevrolet	70	0
11	9	43	Richard Petty	Curb Racing	Pontiac	70	0
12	5	5	Geoff Bodine	Hendrick Motorsports	Chevrolet	14	0
