= NASCAR on television in the 1990s =

As time passed, more Winston Cup races ended up on TV. ESPN broadcast its first race in 1981, from Rockingham Speedway (its first live race was later in the year at Atlanta International Raceway), and TNN followed in 1991. All Cup races were nationally televised by 1985; networks struck individual deals with track owners, and multiple channels carried racing action. Many races were shown taped and edited on Wide World of Sports and syndication services like Mizlou and SETN, but almost all races were live by 1989. By 2000, the last year of this arrangement, six networks televised at least one Cup series race: CBS, ABC, ESPN, TNN, TBS, and NBC.

Also, a growing number of races in the Busch Grand National Series and Craftsman Truck Series were made available for broadcast, and some track owners even threw in support races in lesser series. Likewise, Winston Cup qualifying aired on ESPN2 or regional sports network Prime Network.

NASCAR wanted to capitalize on its increased popularity even more, so they decided that future deals would be centralized; that is, the networks would negotiate directly with NASCAR for a regular schedule of telecasts.

== List of races televised ==
=== 1990 ===
Date	Event	Network	Lap-by-lap	Color commentator(s)
2/15 (Shown 2/17)	Twin 125's (Daytona)	CBS	Ken Squier	Chris Economaki and Ned Jarrett
2/18	Daytona 500	CBS	Ken Squier	Chris Economaki and Ned Jarrett
2/25	Pontiac Excitement 400 (Richmond)	TBS	Ken Squier	Chris Economaki
3/4	Goodwrench 500 (Rockingham)	ESPN	Bob Jenkins	Benny Parsons and Ned Jarrett
3/18	Motorcraft 500 (Atlanta)	ABC	Paul Page	Benny Parsons and Bobby Unser
4/1	Transouth 500 (Darlington)	ESPN	Bob Jenkins	Benny Parsons and Ned Jarrett
4/8	Valleydale Meats 500 (Bristol)	ESPN	Bob Jenkins	Benny Parsons and Ned Jarrett
4/22	First Union 400 (North Wilkesboro)	ESPN	Bob Jenkins	Benny Parsons and Ned Jarrett
4/29	Hanes 500 (Martinsville)	ESPN	Bob Jenkins	Benny Parsons and Ned Jarrett
5/6	Winston 500 (Talladega)	ESPN	Bob Jenkins	Benny Parsons and Ned Jarrett
5/20	The Winston (Charlotte)	ABC	Paul Page	Benny Parsons and Bobby Unser
5/27	Coca-Cola 600 (Charlotte)	TBS	Ken Squier	Neil Bonnett and Lyn St. James
6/3	Budweiser 500 (Dover)	ESPN	Bob Jenkins	Benny Parsons and Ned Jarrett
6/10	Banquet Frozen Foods 300 (Sears Point)	ESPN	Bob Jenkins	Benny Parsons and Ned Jarrett
6/17	Miller Genuine Draft 500 (Pocono)	PPV	Dave Despain	Lyn St. James and Phil Parsons
6/24	Miller Genuine Draft 400 (Michigan)	CBS	Ken Squier	Ned Jarrett and Chris Economaki
7/7	Pepsi 400 (Daytona)	ESPN	Bob Jenkins	Benny Parsons and Ned Jarrett
7/22	AC Spark Plug 500 (Pocono)	ESPN	Bob Jenkins	Benny Parsons and Ned Jarrett
7/29	DieHard 500 (Talladega)	CBS	Ken Squier	Ned Jarrett and David Hobbs
8/12	Bud at the Glen (Watkins Glen)	ESPN	Bob Jenkins	Benny Parsons and Ned Jarrett
8/19	Champion Spark Plug 400 (Michigan)	ESPN	Bob Jenkins	Benny Parsons and Ned Jarrett
8/25	Busch 500 (Bristol)	ESPN	Bob Jenkins	Benny Parsons and Ned Jarrett
9/2	Heinz Southern 500 (Darlington)	ESPN	Bob Jenkins	Benny Parsons and Ned Jarrett
9/9	Miller Genuine Draft 400 (Richmond)	TBS	Ken Squier	Johnny Hayes and Chris Economaki
9/16	Peak 500 (Dover)	ESPN	Bob Jenkins	Benny Parsons and Ned Jarrett
9/23	Goody's 500 (Martinsville)	ESPN	Bob Jenkins	Benny Parsons and Ned Jarrett
9/30	Tyson Holly Farms 400 (North Wilkesboro)	ESPN	Bob Jenkins	Benny Parsons and Ned Jarrett
10/7	Mello Yello 500 (Charlotte)	TBS	Ken Squier	Johnny Hayes and Chris Economaki
10/21	AC Delco 500 (Rockingham)	ESPN	Bob Jenkins	Benny Parsons and Ned Jarrett
11/4	Checker 500 (Phoenix)	ESPN	Bob Jenkins	Benny Parsons and Ned Jarrett
11/18	Atlanta Journal 500 (Atlanta)	ESPN	Bob Jenkins	Benny Parsons and Ned Jarrett

=== 1991-1999 ===
Year	Date	Event	Track	Network	Coverage	Commentary		Pit Reporters
Year	Date	Event	Track	Network	Coverage	Lap-by-lap	Color	Pit Reporters
1991	February 10	Busch Clash	Daytona	CBS	Live	Ken Squier	Ned Jarrett	Mike Joy; Dave Despain
1991	February 14	Gatorade Twin 125s	Daytona	CBS	Highlights	Ken Squier	Ned Jarrett; David Hobbs	Mike Joy; Dave Despain
1991	February 17	Daytona 500	Daytona	CBS	Live	Ken Squier	Ned Jarrett; David Hobbs	Mike Joy; Dave Despain
1991	February 24	Pontiac Excitement 400	Richmond	TBS	Live	Ken Squier	Neil Bonnett; Ken Stabler	Dick Berggren; Phil Parsons
1991	March 3	Goodwrench 500	Rockingham	TNN	Live	Mike Joy	Phil Parsons	Glenn Jarrett; Steve Evans
1991	March 17–18	Motorcraft 500	Atlanta	ABC	Live (Note: The 1991 Motorcraft Quality Parts 500 was rained out after 51 laps on Sunday and ran the next day. ABC couldn't televise the remainder of the race due to its daytime programming.)	Paul Page	Bobby Unser; Benny Parsons	Jerry Punch; Gary Gerould
1991	April 7	TranSouth 500	Darlington	ESPN	Live	Bob Jenkins	Ned Jarrett; Benny Parsons	Jerry Punch; John Kernan
1991	April 14	Valleydale Meats 500	Bristol	ESPN	Live/Delayed (Note: The 1991 Valleydale Meats 500 had ESPN move the finish to tape delay due to a rain delay that lasted 1 hour and 12 minutes.)	Bob Jenkins	Ned Jarrett; Benny Parsons	Jerry Punch; John Kernan
1991	April 21	First Union 400	North Wilkesboro	ESPN	Live	Bob Jenkins	Ned Jarrett; Benny Parsons	Jerry Punch; John Kernan
1991	April 28	Hanes Activewear 500	Martinsville	ESPN	Live	Bob Jenkins	Ned Jarrett; Benny Parsons	Jerry Punch; John Kernan
1991	~~May 5~~; May 6	Winston 500	Talladega	ESPN	Live (Note: The 1991 Winston 500 was scheduled to be on May 5th but rescheduled on May 6th due to a rain delay.)	Bob Jenkins	Ned Jarrett; Benny Parsons	Jerry Punch; John Kernan
1991	May 19	The Winston	Charlotte	CBS	Live	Ken Squier	Ned Jarrett	Mike Joy; Neil Bonnett
1991	May 26	Coca-Cola 600	Charlotte	TBS	Live	Ken Squier	Neil Bonnett	Dick Berggren; Phil Parsons
1991	June 2	Budweiser 500	Dover	TNN	Live	Mike Joy	Buddy Baker; Phil Parsons	Glenn Jarrett; Steve Evans
1991	June 9	Banquet Frozen Foods 300	Sonoma	ESPN	Live	Bob Jenkins	Ned Jarrett; Benny Parsons	Jerry Punch; John Kernan
1991	June 16	Champion Spark Plug 500	Pocono	ESPN	Live	Bob Jenkins	Ned Jarrett	Jerry Punch; John Kernan
1991	June 23	Miller Genuine Draft 400	Michigan	CBS	Live	Ken Squier	Ned Jarrett	Mike Joy; Neil Bonnett
1991	July 6	Pepsi 400	Daytona	ESPN	Live	Bob Jenkins	Ned Jarrett; Benny Parsons	Jerry Punch; John Kernan
1991	July 21	Miller Genuine Draft 500	Pocono	ESPN	Live	Bob Jenkins	Ned Jarrett; Benny Parsons	Jerry Punch; John Kernan
1991	July 28	DieHard 500	Talladega	CBS	Live	Ken Squier	Ned Jarrett	Mike Joy; Neil Bonnett
1991	August 11	Budweiswer at the Glen	Watkins Glen	ESPN	Live	Bob Jenkins	Ned Jarrett; Benny Parsons	Jerry Punch; John Kernan
1991	August 18	Champion Spark Plug 400	Michigan	ESPN	Live	Bob Jenkins	Ned Jarrett; Benny Parsons	Jerry Punch; John Kernan
1991	August 24	Bud 500	Bristol	ESPN	Live	Bob Jenkins	Ned Jarrett; Benny Parsons	Jerry Punch; John Kernan
1991	September 1	Heinz Southern 500	Darlington	ESPN	Live	Bob Jenkins	Ned Jarrett; Benny Parsons	Jerry Punch; John Kernan
1991	September 7	Miller Genuine Draft 400	Richmond	TBS	Live	Ken Squier	Neil Bonnett; Ken Stabler	Dick Berggren; Chris Economaki
1991	September 15	Peak Antifreeze 500	Dover	TNN	Live	Mike Joy	Neil Bonnett; Buddy Baker	Glenn Jarrett; Steve Evans; Brock Yates
1991	September 22	Goody's 500	Martinsville	ESPN	Live	Bob Jenkins	Ned Jarrett; Benny Parsons	Jerry Punch; John Kernan
1991	September 29	Tyson Holly Farms 400	North Wilkesboro	ESPN	Live	Bob Jenkins	Ned Jarrett; Benny Parsons	Jerry Punch; John Kernan
1991	October 6	Mello Yello 500	Charlotte	TBS	Live	Ken Squier	Neil Bonnett	Dick Berggren; Randy Pemberton
1991	October 20	AC Delco 500	Rockingham	TNN	Live	Mike Joy	Neil Bonnett; Buddy Baker	Glenn Jarrett; Steve Evans
1991	November 3	Pyroil 500	Phoenix	TNN	Live	Mike Joy	Neil Bonnett; Buddy Baker	Glenn Jarrett; Brock Yates
1991	November 17	Hardee's 500	Atlanta	ESPN	Live	Bob Jenkins	Ned Jarrett; Benny Parsons	Jerry Punch; John Kernan
1992	February 9	Busch Clash	Daytona	CBS	Live	Ken Squier	Ned Jarrett; Neil Bonnett	Mike Joy
1992	February 13	Gatorade Twin 125s	Daytona	CBS	Highlights	Ken Squier	Ned Jarrett; Neil Bonnett	Mike Joy; David Hobbs
1992	February 16	Daytona 500	Daytona	CBS	Live	Ken Squier	Ned Jarrett; Neil Bonnett	Mike Joy; David Hobbs
1992	March 1	Goodwrench 500	Rockingham	TNN	Live	Mike Joy	Neil Bonnett; Buddy Baker	Glenn Jarrett; Steve Evans
1992	March 8	Pontiac Excitement 400	Richmond	TBS	Live	Ken Squier	Neil Bonnett	Dick Berggren; Randy Pemberton
1992	March 15	Motorcraft 500	Atlanta	ABC	Live	Paul Page	Bobby Unser; Benny Parsons	Jack Arute; Gary Gerould
1992	March 29	TranSouth 500	Darlington	ESPN	Live	Bob Jenkins	Ned Jarrett; Benny Parsons	Jerry Punch; John Kernan
1992	April 5	Food City 500	Bristol	ESPN	Live	Bob Jenkins	Ned Jarrett; Benny Parsons	Jerry Punch; John Kernan
1992	April 12	First Union 400	North Wilkesboro	ESPN	Live	Bob Jenkins	Ned Jarrett; Benny Parsons	Jerry Punch; John Kernan
1992	April 26	Hanes 500	Martinsville	ESPN	Delayed (Note: The 1992 Hanes 500 was held at the same time as the 1992 NFL draft. ESPN chose to cover the NFL Draft live and forcing ESPN to air the race on tape the next day.)	Bob Jenkins	Ned Jarrett; Benny Parsons	Jerry Punch; John Kernan
1992	May 3	Winston 500	Talladega	ESPN	Live	Bob Jenkins	Ned Jarrett; Benny Parsons	Jerry Punch; John Kernan
1992	May 16	Winston Open	Charlotte	TNN	Live	Mike Joy	Neil Bonnett (Note: The 1992 Winston Open saw Buddy Baker drive in the race, Baker finished but did not advance to The Winston.)	Glenn Jarrett; Randy Pemberton
1992	May 16	The Winston	Charlotte	TNN	Live	Mike Joy	Neil Bonnett; Buddy Baker	Glenn Jarrett; Randy Pemberton
1992	May 24	Coca-Cola 600	Charlotte	TBS	Live	Ken Squier	Neil Bonnett	Dick Berggren; Randy Pemberton
1992	May 31	Budweiser 500	Dover	TNN	Live	Mike Joy	Neil Bonnett; Buddy Baker	Glenn Jarrett; Steve Evans
1992	June 7	Save Mart 300K	Sonoma	ESPN	Live	Bob Jenkins	Ned Jarrett; Benny Parsons	Jerry Punch; John Kernan
1992	June 14	Champion Spark Plug 500	Pocono	ESPN	Live	Bob Jenkins	Ned Jarrett; Benny Parsons	Jerry Punch; John Kernan
1992	June 21	Miller Genuine Draft 400	Michigan	CBS	Live	Ken Squier	Ned Jarrett; Neil Bonnett	Mike Joy; Chris Economaki
1992	July 4	Pepsi 400	Daytona	ESPN	Live	Bob Jenkins	Ned Jarrett; Benny Parsons	Jerry Punch; John Kernan
1992	July 19	Miller Genuine Draft 500	Pocono	ESPN	Live	Bob Jenkins	Ned Jarrett; Benny Parsons	Jerry Punch; John Kernan
1992	July 26	DieHard 500	Talladega	CBS	Live	Ken Squier	Ned Jarrett; Neil Bonnett	Mike Joy; Randy Pemberton
1992	August 9	The Bud at The Glen	Watkins Glen	ESPN	Live	Bob Jenkins	Ned Jarrett; Benny Parsons	Jerry Punch; John Kernan
1992	August 16	Champion Spark Plug 400	Michigan	ESPN	Live	Bob Jenkins	Ned Jarrett; Benny Parsons	Jerry Punch; John Kernan
1992	August 29	Bud 500	Bristol	ESPN	Live	Bob Jenkins	Ned Jarrett; Benny Parsons	Jerry Punch; John Kernan
1992	September 6	Mountain Dew Southern 500	Darlington	ESPN	Live	Bob Jenkins	Ned Jarrett; Benny Parsons	Jerry Punch; John Kernan
1992	September 12	Miller Genuine Draft 400	Richmond	TBS	Live	Ken Squier	Neil Bonnett	Randy Pemberton; Glenn Jarrett
1992	September 20	Peak Antifreeze 500	Dover	TNN	Live	Mike Joy	Neil Bonnett; Buddy Baker	Glenn Jarrett; Steve Evans
1992	~~September 27~~; September 28	Goody's 500	Martinsville	ESPN	Live (Note: The 1992 Goody's 500 was scheduled to be on September 27th but rescheduled on September 28th due to a rain delay.)	Bob Jenkins	Ned Jarrett; Benny Parsons	Jerry Punch; John Kernan
1992	~~October 4~~; October 5	Tyson Holly Farms 400	North Wilkesboro	ESPN	Live (Note: The 1992 Tyson Holly Farms 400 was scheduled to be on October 4th but rescheduled on October 5th due to a rain delay.)	Bob Jenkins	Ned Jarrett; Benny Parsons	Jerry Punch; John Kernan
1992	October 11	Mello Yello 500	Charlotte	TBS	Live	Ken Squier	Neil Bonnett	Dick Berggren; Randy Pemberton
1992	October 25	AC Delco 500	Rockingham	TNN	Live	Mike Joy	Neil Bonnett; Buddy Baker	Glenn Jarrett; Steve Evans
1992	November 1	Pyroil 500	Phoenix	TNN	Live	Mike Joy	Neil Bonnett; Buddy Baker	Glenn Jarrett; Randy Pemberton
1992	November 15	Hooters 500	Atlanta	ESPN	Live	Bob Jenkins	Ned Jarrett; Benny Parsons	Jerry Punch; John Kernan
1993	February 7	Busch Clash	Daytona	CBS	Live	Ken Squier	Ned Jarrett; Neil Bonnett	Mike Joy
1993	February 11	Gatorade Twin 125s	Daytona	CBS	Highlights	Ken Squier	Ned Jarrett; Neil Bonnett	Mike Joy; David Hobbs
1993	February 14	Daytona 500	Daytona	CBS	Live	Ken Squier	Ned Jarrett; Neil Bonnett	Mike Joy; David Hobbs
1993	February 28	Goodwrench 500	Rockingham	TNN	Live	Mike Joy	Neil Bonnett; Buddy Baker	Glenn Jarrett; Randy Pemberton
1993	March 7	Pontiac Excitement 400	Richmond	TBS	Live	Ken Squier	Neil Bonnett	Dick Berggren; Randy Pemberton
1993	~~March 14~~	~~Motorcraft Quality Parts 500~~	~~Atlanta~~	~~ABC~~ (Note: The 1993 Motorcraft Quality Parts 500 was scheduled to be on ABC on March 14th but the 1993 Storm of the Century occurred in Atlanta postponing the race.)	~~Live~~	~~N/A~~	~~N/A~~	~~N/A~~
1993	March 20	Motorcraft Quality Parts 500	Atlanta	TNN	Live (Note: The 1993 Motorcraft Quality Parts 500 was rescheduled for March 20th and ABC pulled out and TNN took over.)	Mike Joy	Neil Bonnett; Buddy Baker	Glenn Jarrett; Randy Pemberton
1993	March 28	TranSouth 500	Darlington	ESPN	Live	Bob Jenkins	Ned Jarrett; Benny Parsons	Jerry Punch; John Kernan
1993	April 4	Food City 500	Bristol	ESPN	Live	Bob Jenkins	Ned Jarrett; Benny Parsons	Jerry Punch; John Kernan
1993	April 18	First Union 400	North Wilkesboro	ESPN	Live	Bob Jenkins	Ned Jarrett; Benny Parsons	Jerry Punch; John Kernan
1993	April 25	Hanes 500	Martinsville	ESPN	Live	Bob Jenkins	Ned Jarrett; Benny Parsons	Jerry Punch; John Kernan
1993	May 2	Winston 500	Talladega	ESPN	Live	Bob Jenkins	Ned Jarrett; Benny Parsons	Jerry Punch; John Kernan
1993	May 16	Save Mart Supermarkets 300	Sonoma	ESPN	Live	Bob Jenkins	Ned Jarrett; Benny Parsons	Jerry Punch; John Kernan
1993	May 22	Winston Open	Charlotte	TNN	Live	Mike Joy	Neil Bonnett; Buddy Baker	Glenn Jarrett; Randy Pemberton
1993	May 22	The Winston	Charlotte	TNN	Live	Mike Joy	Neil Bonnett; Buddy Baker	Glenn Jarrett; Randy Pemberton
1993	May 30	Coca-Cola 600	Charlotte	TBS	Live	Ken Squier	Neil Bonnett	Dick Berggren; Randy Pemberton
1993	June 6	Miller Genuine Draft 500	Dover	TNN	Live	Mike Joy	Neil Bonnett; Buddy Baker	Glenn Jarrett; Randy Pemberton
1993	June 13	Champion Spark Plug 500	Pocono	ESPN	Live	Bob Jenkins	Ned Jarrett; Benny Parsons	Jerry Punch; John Kernan
1993	June 20	Miller Genuine Draft 400	Michigan	CBS	Live	Ken Squier	Ned Jarrett; Neil Bonnett	Mike Joy; David Hobbs
1993	July 3	Pepsi 400	Daytona	ESPN	Live	Bob Jenkins	Ned Jarrett; Benny Parsons	Jerry Punch; John Kernan
1993	July 11	Slick 50 300	New Hampshire	TNN	Live	Mike Joy	Neil Bonnett; Buddy Baker	Glenn Jarrett; Randy Pemberton
1993	July 18	Miller Genuine Draft 500	Pocono	TBS	Live	Ken Squier	Neil Bonnett	Dick Berggren; Randy Pemberton
1993	July 25	DieHard 500	Talladega	CBS	Live	Ken Squier	Ned Jarrett; Neil Bonnett (Note: The 1993 DieHard 500 saw Neil Bonnett drive in this race, making his first start since his sidling crash at Darlington in March of 1990. He crashed in spectacular fashion and joined Ken Squier and Ned Jarrett for the finish of the race.)	Mike Joy; David Hobbs
1993	August 8	The Bud at The Glen	Watkins Glen	ESPN	Live	Bob Jenkins	Ned Jarrett; Benny Parsons	Jerry Punch; John Kernan
1993	August 15	Champion Spark Plug 400	Michigan	ESPN	Live	Bob Jenkins	Ned Jarrett; Benny Parsons	Jerry Punch; John Kernan
1993	August 28	Bud 500	Bristol	ESPN	Live	Bob Jenkins	Ned Jarrett; Benny Parsons	Jerry Punch; John Kernan
1993	September 5	Mountain Dew Southern 500	Darlington	ESPN	Live	Bob Jenkins	Ned Jarrett; Benny Parsons	Jerry Punch; John Kernan
1993	September 11	Miller Genuine Draft 400	Richmond	TBS	Live	Ken Squier	Neil Bonnett	Dick Berggren; Randy Pemberton
1993	September 19	Splitfire Spark Plug 500	Dover	TNN	Live	Mike Joy	Neil Bonnett; Buddy Baker	Glenn Jarrett; Randy Pemberton
1993	September 26	Goody's 500	Martinsville	ESPN	Live	Bob Jenkins	Ned Jarrett; Benny Parsons	Jerry Punch; John Kernan
1993	October 3	Tyson Holly Farms 400	North Wilkesboro	ESPN	Live	Bob Jenkins	Ned Jarrett; Benny Parsons	Jerry Punch; John Kernan
1993	October 10	Mello Yello 500	Charlotte	TBS	Live	Ken Squier	Neil Bonnett	Dick Berggren; Johnny Hayes
1993	October 24	AC Delco 500	Rockingham	TNN	Live	Mike Joy	Neil Bonnett; Buddy Baker	Glenn Jarrett; Ralph Sheheen
1993	October 31	Dura Lube 500	Phoenix	TNN	Live	Mike Joy	Neil Bonnett; Buddy Baker	Glenn Jarrett; Ralph Sheheen
1993	November 14	Hooters 500	Atlanta	ESPN	Live	Bob Jenkins	Ned Jarrett; Benny Parsons	Jerry Punch; John Kernan
1994	February 13	Busch Clash	Daytona	CBS	Live	Ken Squier	Ned Jarrett	Mike Joy
1994	February 17	Gatorade Twin 125s	Daytona	CBS	Highlights	Ken Squier	Ned Jarrett; Chris Economaki	Mike Joy; David Hobbs
1994	February 20	Daytona 500	Daytona	CBS	Live	Ken Squier	Ned Jarrett; Chris Economaki	Mike Joy; David Hobbs
1994	February 27	Goodwrench 500	Rockingham	TNN	Live	Mike Joy	Buddy Baker; Glenn Jarrett	Randy Pemberton; Ralph Sheheen
1994	March 6	Pontiac Excitement 400	Richmond	TBS	Live	Ken Squier	Dave Marcis; Kenny Wallace	Dick Berggren; Randy Pemberton; Johnny Hayes
1994	March 13	Purolator 500	Atlanta	ABC	Live	Bob Jenkins	Benny Parsons	Jerry Punch; Jack Arute; John Kernan
1994	March 27	TranSouth Financial 400	Darlington	ESPN	Live	Bob Jenkins	Ned Jarrett; Benny Parsons	Jerry Punch; John Kernan
1994	April 10	Food City 500	Bristol	ESPN	Live	Bob Jenkins	Ned Jarrett; Benny Parsons	Jerry Punch; John Kernan
1994	April 17	First Union 400	North Wilkesboro	ESPN	Live	Bob Jenkins	Ned Jarrett; Benny Parsons	Jerry Punch; John Kernan
1994	April 24	Hanes 500	Martinsville	ESPN	Live	Bob Jenkins	Ned Jarrett; Benny Parsons	Jerry Punch; John Kernan
1994	May 1	Winston Select 500	Talladega	ESPN	Live	Bob Jenkins	Ned Jarrett; Benny Parsons	Jerry Punch; John Kernan
1994	May 15	Save Mart Supermarkets 300	Sonoma	ESPN	Live	Bob Jenkins	Ned Jarrett; Benny Parsons	Jerry Punch; John Kernan
1994	May 21	The Winston Open	Charlotte	TNN	Live	Mike Joy	Buddy Baker	Glenn Jarrett; Randy Pemberton
1994	May 21	The Winston Select	Charlotte	TNN	Live	Mike Joy	Buddy Baker	Glenn Jarrett; Randy Pemberton
1994	May 29	Coca-Cola 600	Charlotte	TBS	Live	Ken Squier	Richard Petty	Dick Berggren; Randy Pemberton; Kenny Wallace
1994	June 5	Miller Genuine Draft 500	Dover	TNN	Live	Mike Joy	Buddy Baker; Kenny Wallace	Glenn Jarrett; Randy Pemberton
1994	June 12	UAW-GM Teamwork 500	Pocono	TNN	Live	Mike Joy	Buddy Baker; Kenny Wallace	Glenn Jarrett; Randy Pemberton
1994	June 19	Miller Genuine Draft 400	Michigan	CBS	Live	Ken Squier	Ned Jarrett	Mike Joy; David Hobbs; Dick Berggren
1994	July 2	Pepsi 400	Daytona	ESPN	Live	Bob Jenkins	Ned Jarrett; Benny Parsons	Jerry Punch; John Kernan
1994	July 10	Slick 50 300	New Hampshire	TNN	Live	Mike Joy	Buddy Baker; Kenny Wallace	Glenn Jarrett; Randy Pemberton
1994	July 17	Miller Genuine Draft 500	Pocono	TBS	Live	Ken Squier	Barry Dodson	Dick Berggren; Randy Pemberton; Kenny Wallace
1994	July 24	DieHard 500	Talladega	CBS	Live	Ken Squier	Ned Jarrett; Richard Petty	Mike Joy; David Hobbs; Dick Berggren
1994	August 6	Brickyard 400	Indianapolis	ABC	Live	Bob Jenkins	Benny Parsons	Jerry Punch; Jack Arute; Gary Gerould
1994	August 14	The Bud at The Glen	Watkins Glen	ESPN	Live	Bob Jenkins	Ned Jarrett; Benny Parsons; Dorsey Schroeder	Jerry Punch; John Kernan
1994	August 21	GM Goodwrench 400	Michigan	ESPN	Live	Bob Jenkins	Ned Jarrett; Benny Parsons	Jerry Punch; John Kernan
1994	August 27	Goody's 500	Bristol	ESPN	Live	Bob Jenkins	Ned Jarrett; Benny Parsons	Jerry Punch; John Kernan
1994	September 4	Mountain Dew Southern 500	Darlington	ESPN	Live	Jerry Punch	Ned Jarrett; Benny Parsons	John Kernan; Marty Reid; Bill Weber
1994	September 10	Miller Genuine Draft 400	Richmond	TBS	Live	Ken Squier	Chuck Bown	Dick Berggren; Randy Pemberton
1994	September 18	Splitfire Spark Plug 500	Dover	TNN	Live	Mike Joy	Buddy Baker; Chuck Bown	Glenn Jarrett; Randy Pemberton
1994	September 25	Goody's 500	Martinsville	ESPN	Live	Jerry Punch	Ned Jarrett; Benny Parsons	John Kernan; Bill Weber
1994	October 2	Tyson Holly Farms 400	North Wilkesboro	ESPN	Live	Jerry Punch	Ned Jarrett; Benny Parsons	John Kernan; Bill Weber
1994	October 9	Mello Yello 500	Charlotte	TBS	Live	Ken Squier	Chuck Bown; Cale Yarborough	Dick Berggren; Randy Pemberton
1994	October 23	AC Delco 500	Rockingham	TNN	Live	Mike Joy	Buddy Baker; David Pearson	Glenn Jarrett; Randy Pemberton
1994	October 30	Dura Lube 500	Phoenix	TNN	Live	Mike Joy	Buddy Baker; David Pearson	Glenn Jarrett; Randy Pemberton
1994	November 13	Hooters 500	Atlanta	ESPN	Live	Bob Jenkins	Ned Jarrett; Benny Parsons	Jerry Punch; John Kernan
1995	February 12	Busch Clash	Daytona	CBS	Live	Ken Squier	Ned Jarrett; Darrell Waltrip	Mike Joy; David Hobbs
1995	February 16	Gatorade Twin 125s	Daytona	CBS	Highlights	Ken Squier	Ned Jarrett	Mike Joy; David Hobbs
1995	February 19	Daytona 500	Daytona	CBS	Live	Ken Squier	Ned Jarrett; Richard Petty	Mike Joy; David Hobbs; Dick Berggren
1995	February 26	Goodwrench 500	Rockingham	TNN	Live	Mike Joy	Buddy Baker; Ernie Irvan	Glenn Jarrett; Randy Pemberton
1995	March 5	Pontiac Excitement 400	Richmond	TBS	Live	Ken Squier	Ernie Irvan; Chuck Bown	Randy Pemberton; Dick Berggren; Steve Byrnes
1995	March 12	Purolator 500	Atlanta	ABC	Live	Bob Jenkins	Benny Parsons	Jerry Punch; Jack Arute; John Kernan
1995	March 26	TranSouth Financial 400	Darlington	ESPN	Live	Bob Jenkins	Ned Jarrett; Benny Parsons	Jerry Punch; Bill Weber; John Kernan
1995	April 2	Food City 500	Bristol	ESPN	Live	Bob Jenkins	Ned Jarrett; Benny Parsons	Jerry Punch; Bill Weber; John Kernan
1995	April 9	First Union 400	North Wilkesboro	ESPN	Live	Bob Jenkins	Ned Jarrett; Benny Parsons	Jerry Punch; John Kernan
1995	April 23	Hanes 500	Martinsville	ESPN	Live	Bob Jenkins	Ned Jarrett; Benny Parsons	Jerry Punch; Bill Weber; John Kernan
1995	April 30	Winston Select 500	Talladega	ESPN	Live	Bob Jenkins	Ned Jarrett; Benny Parsons	Jerry Punch; Bill Weber; John Kernan
1995	May 7	Save Mart Supermarkets 300	Sonoma	ESPN	Live	Bob Jenkins	Ned Jarrett; Benny Parsons	Jerry Punch; John Kernan
1995	May 20	Winston Open	Charlotte	TNN	Live	Mike Joy	Buddy Baker; Ernie Irvan	Glenn Jarrett; Randy Pemberton
1995	May 20	The Winston Select	Charlotte	TNN	Live	Mike Joy	Buddy Baker; Ernie Irvan	Glenn Jarrett; Randy Pemberton
1995	May 28	Coca-Cola 600	Charlotte	TBS	Live	Ken Squier	Ernie Irvan; Richard Petty	Randy Pemberton; Dick Berggren; Steve Byrnes
1995	June 4	Miller Genuine Draft 500	Dover	TNN	Live	Mike Joy	Buddy Baker; Ernie Irvan	Glenn Jarrett; Randy Pemberton
1995	June 11	UAW-GM Teamwork 500	Pocono	TNN	Live	Mike Joy	Buddy Baker; Ernie Irvan	Glenn Jarrett; Randy Pemberton
1995	June 18	Miller Genuine Draft 400	Michigan	CBS	Live	Ken Squier	Ned Jarrett; Richard Petty	Mike Joy; David Hobbs; Dick Berggren
1995	July 1	Pepsi 400	Daytona	ESPN; ESPN2	Live (Note: the 1995 Pepsi 400 had ESPN air the race while ESPN2 showed onboard cameras and radio with some of the teams.)	Bob Jenkins	Benny Parsons	Jerry Punch; Bill Weber; John Kernan
1995	July 9	Slick 50 300	New Hampshire	TNN	Live	Mike Joy	Buddy Baker; Ernie Irvan	Glenn Jarrett; Randy Pemberton
1995	July 16	Miller Genuine Draft 500	Pocono	TBS	Live	Ken Squier	Dick Berggren; Chad Little	Randy Pemberton; Steve Byrnes; Johnny Benson
1995	July 23	DieHard 500	Talladega	CBS	Live	Ken Squier	Ned Jarrett; Richard Petty	Mike Joy; David Hobbs; Dick Berggren
1995	August 5	Brickyard 400	Indianapolis	~~ABC~~; ESPN	~~Live~~; Delayed (Note: The 1995 Brickyard 400 was scheduled to be on ABC but a rain delay that went beyond ABC's broadcast window meant it had to be moved to ESPN which aired the race on tape delay the following day.)	Bob Jenkins	Benny Parsons	Jerry Punch; Jack Arute; Gary Gerould
1995	August 13	The Bud at The Glen	Watkins Glen	ESPN	Live	Bob Jenkins	Ned Jarrett; Bill Weber; Dorsey Schroeder	Jerry Punch; John Kernan
1995	August 20	GM Goodwrench 400	Michigan	ESPN	Live	Jerry Punch	Ned Jarrett; Benny Parsons	Bill Weber; John Kernan
1995	August 26	Goody's 500	Bristol	ESPN	Live	Bob Jenkins	Ned Jarrett; Benny Parsons	Jerry Punch; Bill Weber; John Kernan
1995	September 3	Mountain Dew Southern 500	Darlington	ESPN; ESPN2	Live (Note: the 1995 Mountain Dew Southern 500 had ESPN air the race while ESPN2 showed onboard cameras and radio with some of the teams.)	Bob Jenkins	Ned Jarrett; Benny Parsons	Jerry Punch; Bill Weber; John Kernan
1995	September 9	Miller Genuine Draft 400	Richmond	TBS	Live	Ken Squier	Dick Berggren; Chad Little	Randy Pemberton; Steve Byrnes
1995	September 17	MBNA 400	Dover	TNN	Live	Mike Joy	Buddy Baker; Kenny Wallace	Glenn Jarrett; Randy Pemberton
1995	September 24	Goody's 500	Martinsville	ESPN	Live	Bob Jenkins	Ned Jarrett; Benny Parsons	Jerry Punch; Bill Weber; John Kernan
1995	October 1	Tyson Holly Farms 400	North Wilkesboro	ESPN	Live	Bob Jenkins	Ned Jarrett; Benny Parsons	Jerry Punch; Bill Weber; John Kernan
1995	October 8	UAW-GM Quality 500	Charlotte	TBS	Live	Ken Squier	Dick Berggren; Ernie Irvan	Randy Pemberton; Steve Byrnes; Barry Dodson
1995	October 22	AC Delco 400	Rockingham	TNN	Live	Mike Joy	Buddy Baker; Dick Berggren	Glenn Jarrett; Randy Pemberton
1995	October 29	Dura Lube 500	Phoenix	TNN	Live	Mike Joy	Buddy Baker; Dick Berggren	Glenn Jarrett; Randy Pemberton
1995	November 12	NAPA 500	Atlanta	ESPN	Live	Bob Jenkins	Ned Jarrett; Benny Parsons	Jerry Punch; Bill Weber; John Kernan
1996	February 11	Busch Clash	Daytona	CBS	Live	Ken Squier	Ned Jarrett; Kenny Wallace	Mike Joy; Dick Berggren
1996	February 15	Gatorade Twin 125s	Daytona	CBS	Highlights	Ken Squier	Ned Jarrett; Buddy Baker	Mike Joy; David Hobbs; Dick Berggren
1996	February 18	Daytona 500	Daytona	CBS	Live	Ken Squier	Ned Jarrett; Buddy Baker	Mike Joy; David Hobbs; Dick Berggren
1996	February 25	Goodwrench Service 400	Rockingham	TNN	Live	Eli Gold	Buddy Baker; Dick Berggren	Glenn Jarrett; Randy Pemberton
1996	March 3	Pontiac Excitement 400	Richmond	ESPN	Live	Bob Jenkins	Ned Jarrett; Benny Parsons	Jerry Punch; Bill Weber; John Kernan
1996	March 10	Purolator 500	Atlanta	ABC	Live	Bob Jenkins	Benny Parsons	Jerry Punch; Bill Weber; Jack Arute
1996	March 24	TranSouth Financial 400	Darlington	ESPN	Live	Bob Jenkins	Ned Jarrett; Benny Parsons	Jerry Punch; Bill Weber; John Kernan
1996	March 31	Food City 500	Bristol	ESPN	Live	Bob Jenkins	Ned Jarrett; Benny Parsons	Jerry Punch; Bill Weber; John Kernan
1996	April 14	First Union 400	North Wilkesboro	ESPN	Live	Bob Jenkins	Ned Jarrett; Benny Parsons	Jerry Punch; Bill Weber; John Kernan
1996	April 21	Goody's Headache Powder 500	Martinsville	ESPN	Live	Bob Jenkins	Ned Jarrett; Benny Parsons	Jerry Punch; Bill Weber; John Kernan
1996	April 28	Winston Select 500	Talladega	ESPN	Live	Bob Jenkins	Ned Jarrett	Jerry Punch; Bill Weber; John Kernan
1996	May 5	Save Mart Supermarkets 300	Sonoma	ESPN	Live	Bob Jenkins	Ned Jarrett; Benny Parsons	Jerry Punch; Bill Weber
1996	May 18	Winston Open	Charlotte	TNN	Live	Eli Gold	Buddy Baker; Dick Berggren	Glenn Jarrett; Randy Pemberton
1996	May 18	The Winston Select	Charlotte	TNN	Live	Eli Gold	Buddy Baker; Dick Berggren	Glenn Jarrett; Randy Pemberton
1996	May 26	Coca-Cola 600	Charlotte	TBS	Live	Ken Squier	Buddy Baker; Dick Berggren	Steve Byrnes; Randy Pemberton; Patty Moise
1996	June 2	Miller 500	Dover	TNN	Live	Eli Gold	Buddy Baker; Chad Little	Glenn Jarrett; Randy Pemberton
1996	June 16	UAW-GM Teamwork 500	Pocono	TNN	Live	Eli Gold	Buddy Baker; Phil Parsons	Glenn Jarrett; Randy Pemberton
1996	June 23	Miller 400	Michigan	CBS	Live	Ken Squier	Ned Jarrett; Buddy Baker	Mike Joy; David Hobbs; Dick Berggren
1996	July 6	Pepsi 400	Daytona	ESPN	Live	Bob Jenkins	Benny Parsons	Jerry Punch; Bill Weber; John Kernan
1996	July 14	Jiffy Lube 300	New Hampshire	TNN	Live	Eli Gold	Buddy Baker; Chad Little	Glenn Jarrett; Randy Pemberton
1996	July 21	Miller 500	Pocono	TBS	Live	Ken Squier	Buddy Baker; Chad Little	Dick Berggren; Steve Byrnes; Mike Wallace
1996	July 28	DieHard 500	Talladega	CBS	Delayed (Note: The 1996 DieHard 500 had a three hour Rain delay and CBS switched to Golf, Race was aired on CBS in its entirety on August 4th.)	Ken Squier	Ned Jarrett; Buddy Baker	Mike Joy; David Hobbs; Dick Berggren
1996	August 3	Brickyard 400	Indianapolis	ABC	Live	Bob Jenkins	Benny Parsons; Danny Sullivan	Jerry Punch; Jack Arute; Gary Gerould
1996	August 11	The Bud at The Glen	Watkins Glen	ESPN	Live	Bob Jenkins	Ned Jarrett; Benny Parsons	Jerry Punch; Bill Weber
1996	August 18	DeVilbiss 400	Michigan	ESPN	Live	Bob Jenkins	Ned Jarrett; Benny Parsons	Jerry Punch; Bill Weber; Dave Despain
1996	August 24	Goody's Headache Powder 500	Bristol	ESPN	Live	Bob Jenkins	Ned Jarrett; Benny Parsons	Jerry Punch; Bill Weber; John Kernan
1996	September 1	Mountain Dew Southern 500	Darlington	ESPN	Live	Bob Jenkins	Ned Jarrett; Benny Parsons	Jerry Punch; Bill Weber; John Kernan
1996	September 7	Miller 400	Richmond	ESPN	Live	Bob Jenkins	Ned Jarrett; Benny Parsons	Jerry Punch; Bill Weber; John Kernan
1996	September 15	MBNA 400	Dover	TNN	Live	Eli Gold	Buddy Baker; Dick Berggren	Glenn Jarrett; Randy Pemberton
1996	September 22	Hanes 500	Martinsville	ESPN	Live	Bob Jenkins	Ned Jarrett; Benny Parsons	Jerry Punch; Bill Weber; John Kernan
1996	September 29	Tyson Holly Farms 400	North Wilkesboro	ESPN	Live	Bob Jenkins	Ned Jarrett; Benny Parsons	Jerry Punch; Bill Weber; John Kernan
1996	October 6	UAW-GM Quality 500	Charlotte	TBS	Live	Ken Squier	Buddy Baker; Mike Wallace	Dick Berggren; Steve Byrnes; Shawna Robinson
1996	October 20	AC Delco 400	Rockingham	TNN	Live	Eli Gold	Buddy Baker; Dick Berggren	Glenn Jarrett; Randy Pemberton
1996	October 27	Dura Lube 500	Phoenix	TNN	Live	Eli Gold	Buddy Baker; Dick Berggren	Glenn Jarrett; Randy Pemberton
1996	November 10	NAPA 500	Atlanta	ESPN	Live	Bob Jenkins	Ned Jarrett; Benny Parsons	Jerry Punch; Bill Weber; John Kernan
1996	November 24	NASCAR Suzuka Thunder Special	Suzuka	TBS	Live	Ken Squier	Buddy Baker	Dick Berggren; Steve Byrnes; Kenji Momota
1997	February 9	Busch Clash	Daytona	CBS	Live	Ken Squier	Ned Jarrett; Darrell Waltrip	Mike Joy; Dick Berggren
1997	February 13	Gatorade 125s	Daytona	CBS	Highlights	Ken Squier	Ned Jarrett; Buddy Baker	Mike Joy; Dick Berggren; Ralph Sheheen
1997	February 16	Daytona 500	Daytona	CBS	Live	Ken Squier	Ned Jarrett; Buddy Baker	Mike Joy; Dick Berggren; Ralph Sheheen
1997	February 23	Goodwrench Service 400	Rockingham	TNN	Live	Eli Gold	Buddy Baker; Dick Berggren	Glenn Jarrett; Matt Yocum; Steve Byrnes
1997	March 2	Pontiac Excitement 400	Richmond	ESPN	Live	Bob Jenkins	Ned Jarrett; Benny Parsons	Jerry Punch; Bill Weber; John Kernan
1997	March 9	Primestar 500	Atlanta	ABC	Live	Bob Jenkins	Benny Parsons	Jerry Punch; Bill Weber; Jack Arute
1997	March 23	TranSouth Financial 400	Darlington	ESPN	Live	Bob Jenkins	Ned Jarrett; Benny Parsons	Jerry Punch; Bill Weber; John Kernan
1997	April 6	Interstate Batteries 500	Texas	CBS	Live	Ken Squier	Ned Jarrett; Buddy Baker	Mike Joy; Dick Berggren; Ralph Sheheen
1997	April 13	Food City 500	Bristol	ESPN	Live	Jerry Punch	Ned Jarrett; Benny Parsons	Bill Weber; John Kernan; Ray Dunlap
1997	April 20	Goody's Headache Powder 500	Martinsville	ESPN	Live	Bob Jenkins	Ned Jarrett; Benny Parsons	Jerry Punch; Bill Weber; John Kernan
1997	May 4	Save Mart Supermarkets 300	Sonoma	ESPN	Live	Bob Jenkins	Ned Jarrett; Benny Parsons	Jerry Punch; Bill Weber
1997	~~April 27~~; May 10	Winston 500	Talladega	ESPN	Live (Note: The 1997 Winston 500 was scheduled to be on April 27th but was moved back two weeks due to rain as it washed out any chance to hold the race on Sunday or Monday. To complicate matters, the series was racing the Save Mart Supermarkets 300 at Sonoma Raceway the following weekend and the travel burden for the teams would be too much to overcome if the race were to be held Tuesday as would be the normal policy (next available day). Series officials decided to have the teams pack up and depart for Sonoma, and rescheduled the Winston 500 for the weekend after that May 10th.)	Bob Jenkins	Ned Jarrett; Benny Parsons	Jerry Punch; Bill Weber; John Kernan
1997	May 17	Winston Open	Charlotte	TNN	Live	Eli Gold	Buddy Baker; Dick Berggren	Glenn Jarrett; Matt Yocum; Steve Byrnes
1997	May 17	The Winston	Charlotte	TNN	Live	Eli Gold	Buddy Baker; Dick Berggren	Glenn Jarrett; Matt Yocum; Steve Byrnes
1997	May 25	Coca-Cola 600	Charlotte	TBS	Live	Ken Squier	Buddy Baker; Dick Berggren	Allen Bestwick; Mike Hogewood; Patty Moise
1997	June 1	Miller 500	Dover	TNN	Live	Eli Gold	Buddy Baker; Dick Berggren	Glenn Jarrett; Matt Yocum; Steve Byrnes
1997	June 8	Pocono 500	Pocono	TNN	Live	Eli Gold	Buddy Baker; Dick Berggren	Glenn Jarrett; Matt Yocum; Steve Byrnes
1997	June 15	Miller 400	Michigan	CBS	Live	Ken Squier	Ned Jarrett; Buddy Baker	Mike Joy; Dick Berggren; Ralph Sheheen
1997	June 22	California 500	California	ABC	Live	Bob Jenkins	Benny Parsons	Jerry Punch; Bill Weber; Jack Arute
1997	July 5	Pepsi 400	Daytona	ESPN	Live	Bob Jenkins	Benny Parsons	Jerry Punch; Bill Weber; John Kernan
1997	July 13	Jiffy Lube 300	New Hampshire	TNN	Live	Eli Gold	Buddy Baker; Dick Berggren	Glenn Jarrett; Matt Yocum; Steve Byrnes
1997	July 20	Pennsylvania 500	Pocono	TBS	Live	Ken Squier	Buddy Baker; Greg Sacks	Glenn Jarrett; Mike Hogewood; Matt Yocum
1997	August 3	Brickyard 400	Indianapolis	ABC	Live	Bob Jenkins	Benny Parsons	Jerry Punch; Bill Weber; Jack Arute
1997	August 10	The Bud at The Glen	Watkins Glen	ESPN	Live	Bob Jenkins	Ned Jarrett; Benny Parsons	Jerry Punch; Bill Weber
1997	August 17	DeVilbiss 400	Michigan	ESPN	Live	Bob Jenkins	Ned Jarrett; Benny Parsons	Jerry Punch; Bill Weber; John Kernan
1997	August 23	Goody's Headache Powder 500	Bristol	ESPN	Live	Bob Jenkins	Ned Jarrett; Benny Parsons	Jerry Punch; Bill Weber; John Kernan
1997	August 31	Mountain Dew Southern 500	Darlington	ESPN	Live	Bob Jenkins	Ned Jarrett; Benny Parsons	Jerry Punch; Bill Weber; John Kernan
1997	September 6	Exide NASCAR Select Batteries 400	Richmond	ESPN	Live	Bob Jenkins	Ned Jarrett; Benny Parsons	Jerry Punch; Bill Weber; John Kernan
1997	September 14	Farm Aid on CMT 300	New Hampshire	TNN	Live	Eli Gold	Buddy Baker; Dick Berggren	Glenn Jarrett; Matt Yocum; Steve Byrnes
1997	September 21	MBNA 400	Dover	TNN	Live	Eli Gold	Buddy Baker; Dick Berggren	Glenn Jarrett; Matt Yocum; Steve Byrnes
1997	~~September 28~~; September 29	Hanes 500	Martinsville	ESPN	Live (Note: The 1997 Hanes 500 was scheduled to be on September 28th but rescheduled on September 29th due to a rain delay. John Kernan was there on Sunday but not on Monday.)	Bob Jenkins	Ned Jarrett; Benny Parsons	Jerry Punch; Bill Weber; ~~John Kernan~~
1997	October 5	UAW-GM Quality 500	Charlotte	TBS	Live	Ken Squier	Buddy Baker	Allen Bestwick; Steve Byrnes; Randy Pemberton
1997	October 12	DieHard 500	Talladega	CBS	Live	Mike Joy	Ned Jarrett; Buddy Baker	Dick Berggren; Ralph Sheheen; Bill Stephens
1997	~~October 26~~; October 27	AC Delco 400	Rockingham	TNN	Live (Note: The 1997 AC Delco 400 was scheduled to be on October 26th but rescheduled on October 27th due to a rain delay.)	Eli Gold	Buddy Baker; Dick Berggren	Glenn Jarrett; Matt Yocum; Steve Byrnes
1997	November 2	Dura Lube 500 presented by Kmart	Phoenix	TNN	Live	Eli Gold	Buddy Baker; Dick Berggren	Glenn Jarrett; Matt Yocum; Steve Byrnes
1997	November 16	NAPA 500	Atlanta	ESPN	Live	Bob Jenkins	Ned Jarrett; Benny Parsons	Jerry Punch; Bill Weber; John Kernan
1997	November 23	NASCAR Suzuka Thunder Special	Suzuka	TBS	Live	Ken Squier	Buddy Baker	Allen Bestwick; Steve Byrnes; Kenji Momota
1998	February 8	Bud Shootout Qualifier	Daytona	ESPN	Live	Bob Jenkins	Benny Parsons; Kyle Petty	Jerry Punch; Bill Weber
1998	February 8	Bud Shootout	Daytona	CBS	Live	Mike Joy	Ned Jarrett; Buddy Baker	Dick Berggren; Ralph Sheheen; Bill Stephens
1998	February 12	Gatorade 125s	Daytona	CBS	Delayed	Mike Joy	Ned Jarrett; Buddy Baker	Dick Berggren; Ralph Sheheen; Bill Stephens
1998	February 15	Daytona 500	Daytona	CBS	Live	Mike Joy	Ned Jarrett; Buddy Baker	Dick Berggren; Ralph Sheheen; Bill Stephens
1998	February 22	GM Goodwrench Service Plus 400	Rockingham	TNN	Live	Eli Gold	Buddy Baker; Dick Berggren	Glenn Jarrett; Matt Yocum; Steve Byrnes
1998	March 1	Las Vegas 400	Las Vegas	ABC	Live	Bob Jenkins	Benny Parsons	Jerry Punch; Bill Weber; Jack Arute
1998	~~March 8~~	~~Primestar 500~~	~~Atlanta~~	~~ABC~~	~~Live~~ (Note: The 1998 Primestar 500 was scheduled to be on ABC but a rain delay to Monday meant it had to be moved to ESPN which aired the race the following day.)	~~Bob Jenkins~~	~~Benny Parsons~~	~~Jerry Punch~~; ~~Bill Weber~~; ~~Jack Arute~~
1998	March 9	Primestar 500	Atlanta	ESPN	Live	Bob Jenkins	Ned Jarrett; Benny Parsons	Jerry Punch; Bill Weber; Ray Dunlap
1998	March 22	TranSouth Financial 400	Darlington	ESPN	Live	Bob Jenkins	Ned Jarrett; Benny Parsons	Jerry Punch; Bill Weber; John Kernan
1998	March 29	Food City 500	Bristol	ESPN	Live	Bob Jenkins	Ned Jarrett; Benny Parsons	Bill Weber; John Kernan; Ray Dunlap
1998	April 5	Texas 500	Texas	CBS	Live	Mike Joy	Ned Jarrett; Buddy Baker	Dick Berggren; Ralph Sheheen; Bill Stephens
1998	~~April 19~~; April 20	Goody's Headache Powder 500	Martinsville	ESPN	Live (Note: The 1997 Hanes 500 was scheduled to be on April 19th but rescheduled on April 20th due to a rain delay. John Kernan was there on Sunday but not on Monday and replaced by Ray Dunlap on pitlane.)	Bob Jenkins	Ned Jarrett; Benny Parsons	Jerry Punch; Bill Weber; Ray Dunlap; ~~John Kernan~~
1998	April 26	DieHard 500	Talladega	ABC	Live	Bob Jenkins	Benny Parsons	Jerry Punch; Bill Weber; Jack Arute
1998	May 3	California 500	California	ESPN	Live	Bob Jenkins	Ned Jarrett; Benny Parsons	Jerry Punch; Bill Weber; John Kernan
1998	May 16	No Bull 25 Shootout	Charlotte	Speedvision	Live	Eli Gold	Buddy Baker; Dick Berggren	Glenn Jarrett; Matt Yocum; Steve Byrnes
1998	May 16	The Winston Open	Charlotte	TNN	Live	Eli Gold	Buddy Baker; Dick Berggren	Glenn Jarrett; Matt Yocum; Steve Byrnes
1998	May 16	The Winston	Charlotte	TNN	Live	Eli Gold	Buddy Baker; Dick Berggren	Glenn Jarrett; Matt Yocum; Steve Byrnes
1998	May 24	Coca-Cola 600	Charlotte	TBS	Live	Ken Squier	Buddy Baker; Dick Berggren	Allen Bestwick; Steve Byrnes; Randy Pemberton
1998	May 31	MBNA Platinum 400	Dover	TNN	Live	Eli Gold	Buddy Baker; Dick Berggren	Glenn Jarrett; Matt Yocum; Steve Byrnes
1998	June 6	Pontiac Excitement 400	Richmond	ESPN	Live	Bob Jenkins	Ned Jarrett; Benny Parsons	Jerry Punch; Bill Weber; John Kernan
1998	June 14	Miller Lite 400	Michigan	CBS	Live	Mike Joy	Ned Jarrett; Buddy Baker	Dick Berggren; Ralph Sheheen; Bill Stephens
1998	June 21	Pocono 500	Pocono	TNN	Live	Eli Gold	Buddy Baker; Dick Berggren	Glenn Jarrett; Matt Yocum; Steve Byrnes
1998	June 28	Save Mart/Kragen 350	Sonoma	ESPN; ESPN2 (Note: The 1998 Save Mart/Kragen 350 saw coverage start on ESPN2 due to ESPN airing a Golf playoff before coverage moved to ESPN after the golf finished.)	Live	Bob Jenkins	Ned Jarrett; Benny Parsons	Jerry Punch; Bill Weber; John Kernan
1998	~~July 4~~	~~Pepsi 400~~	~~Daytona~~	~~CBS~~	~~Live~~ (Note: The 1998 Pepsi 400 was scheduled to be held on July 4th but the 1998 Florida wildfires occurred. At 10am on July 2, NASCAR announced that the race was being postponed and the decision was made to reschedule the race for October 17, to allow additional time for the wildfires to be controlled.)	~~Mike Joy~~	~~Ned Jarrett~~; ~~Buddy Baker~~	~~Dick Berggren~~; ~~Ralph Sheheen~~; ~~Bill Stephens~~
1998	July 12	Jiffy Lube 300	New Hampshire	TNN	Live	Eli Gold	Buddy Baker; Dick Berggren	Glenn Jarrett; Matt Yocum; Steve Byrnes
1998	July 26	Pennsylvania 500	Pocono	TBS	Live	Ken Squier	Buddy Baker; Dick Berggren	Allen Bestwick; Steve Byrnes; Randy Pemberton
1998	August 1	Brickyard 400	Indianapolis	ABC	Live	Bob Jenkins	Benny Parsons	Jerry Punch; Bill Weber; Jack Arute
1998	August 9	The Bud at The Glen	Watkins Glen	ESPN	Live	Bob Jenkins	Ned Jarrett; Benny Parsons	Jerry Punch; Bill Weber; John Kernan
1998	August 16	Pepsi 400	Michigan	ESPN	Live	Bob Jenkins	Ned Jarrett; Benny Parsons	Jerry Punch; Bill Weber; John Kernan
1998	August 22	Goody's Headache Powder 500	Bristol	ESPN	Live	Bob Jenkins	Ned Jarrett; Benny Parsons	Jerry Punch; Bill Weber; John Kernan
1998	August 30	Farm Aid on CMT 300	New Hampshire	TNN	Live	Eli Gold	Buddy Baker; Dick Berggren	Glenn Jarrett; Matt Yocum; Steve Byrnes
1998	September 6	Pepsi Southern 500	Darlington	ESPN	Live	Bob Jenkins	Ned Jarrett; Benny Parsons	Jerry Punch; Bill Weber; John Kernan
1998	September 12	Exide NASCAR Select Batteries 400	Richmond	ESPN	Live	Bob Jenkins	Ned Jarrett; Benny Parsons	Jerry Punch; Bill Weber; John Kernan
1998	September 20	MBNA Gold 400	Dover	TNN	Live	Eli Gold	Buddy Baker; Dick Berggren	Glenn Jarrett; Matt Yocum; Steve Byrnes
1998	September 27	NAPA Autocare 500	Martinsville	ESPN	Live	Bob Jenkins	Ned Jarrett; Benny Parsons	Jerry Punch; Bill Weber; John Kernan
1998	October 4	UAW-GM Quality 500	Charlotte	TBS	Live	Ken Squier	Buddy Baker; Dick Berggren	Allen Bestwick; Steve Byrnes; Randy Pemberton
1998	October 11	Winston 500	Talladega	ESPN	Live	Jerry Punch	Ned Jarrett; Benny Parsons	Bill Weber; John Kernan; Ray Dunlap
1998	October 17	Pepsi 400	Daytona	TNN	Live (Note: The rescheduling of the 1998 Pepsi 400 meant that the race would not be televised on CBS, as the network did not want to compete against Fox's broadcast of Game 1 of the Major League Baseball World Series which was held the same day. TNN took over broadcasting the race with their own crew.)	Eli Gold	Buddy Baker; Dick Berggren	Glenn Jarrett; Steve Byrnes; Mike Hogewood
1998	October 25	Dura Lube/Kmart 500	Phoenix	TNN	Live	Eli Gold	Buddy Baker; Dick Berggren	Glenn Jarrett; Matt Yocum; Steve Byrnes
1998	November 1	AC Delco 400	Rockingham	TNN	Live	Eli Gold	Buddy Baker; Dick Berggren	Glenn Jarrett; Matt Yocum; Steve Byrnes
1998	November 8	NAPA 500	Atlanta	ESPN; ESPN2 (Note: The 1998 NAPA 500 saw coverage start on ESPN but move to ESPN2 due to multiple rain delays.)	Live	Bob Jenkins	Ned Jarrett; Benny Parsons	Jerry Punch; Bill Weber; John Kernan
1998	November 22	Coca-Cola 500	Twin Ring Motegi	TBS	Live	Ken Squier	Buddy Baker; Dick Berggren	Allen Bestwick; Steve Byrnes
1999	February 7	Bud Shootout Qualifier	Daytona	ESPN	Live	Bob Jenkins	Benny Parsons; Kyle Petty	Jerry Punch; Bill Weber
1999	February 7	Bud Shootout	Daytona	CBS	Live	Mike Joy	Ned Jarrett; Darrell Waltrip	Dick Berggren; Ralph Sheheen; Bill Stephens
1999	February 11	Gatorade 125s	Daytona	CBS	Delayed	Mike Joy	Ned Jarrett; Buddy Baker	Dick Berggren; Ralph Sheheen; Bill Stephens
1999	February 14	Daytona 500	Daytona	CBS	Live	Mike Joy	Ned Jarrett; Buddy Baker	Dick Berggren; Ralph Sheheen; Bill Stephens
1999	February 21	Dura Lube/Kmart 400	Rockingham	TNN	Live	Mike Joy	Buddy Baker; Dick Berggren	Glenn Jarrett; Ralph Sheheen; Steve Byrnes
1999	March 7	Las Vegas 400	Las Vegas	ABC	Live	Bob Jenkins	Benny Parsons	Jerry Punch; Bill Weber; John Kernan
1999	March 14	Cracker Barrel 500	Atlanta	ABC	Live	Bob Jenkins	Benny Parsons	Jerry Punch; Bill Weber; John Kernan
1999	March 21	TranSouth Financial 400	Darlington	ESPN	Live	Bob Jenkins	Ned Jarrett; Benny Parsons	Jerry Punch; Bill Weber; John Kernan
1999	March 28	Primestar 500	Texas	CBS	Live	Mike Joy	Ned Jarrett; Buddy Baker	Dick Berggren; Ralph Sheheen; Bill Stephens
1999	April 11	Food City 500	Bristol	ESPN	Live	Bob Jenkins	Ned Jarrett; Benny Parsons	Jerry Punch; Bill Weber; John Kernan
1999	April 18	Goody's Body Pain 500	Martinsville	ESPN	Live	Bob Jenkins	Ned Jarrett; Benny Parsons	Jerry Punch; Bill Weber; John Kernan
1999	April 25	DieHard 500	Talladega	ABC	Live	Bob Jenkins	Benny Parsons	Jerry Punch; Bill Weber; John Kernan
1999	May 2	California 500	California	ABC	Live	Bob Jenkins	Benny Parsons	Jerry Punch; Bill Weber; John Kernan
1999	May 15	Pontiac Excitement 400	Richmond	ESPN	Live	Bob Jenkins	Ned Jarrett; Benny Parsons	Jerry Punch; Bill Weber; John Kernan
1999	May 22	No Bull 25 Shootout	Charlotte	Speedvision	Live	Eli Gold	Buddy Baker; Dick Berggren	Glenn Jarrett; Ralph Sheheen; Steve Byrnes
1999	May 22	The Winston Open	Charlotte	TNN	Live	Eli Gold	Buddy Baker; Dick Berggren	Glenn Jarrett; Ralph Sheheen; Steve Byrnes
1999	May 22	The Winston	Charlotte	TNN	Live	Eli Gold	Buddy Baker; Dick Berggren	Glenn Jarrett; Ralph Sheheen; Steve Byrnes
1999	May 30	Coca-Cola 600	Charlotte	TBS	Live	Ken Squier	Buddy Baker; Dick Berggren	Marty Snider; Alice Cook; Mike Hogewood
1999	June 6	MBNA Platinum 400	Dover	TNN	Live	Eli Gold	Buddy Baker; Dick Berggren	Glenn Jarrett; Ralph Sheheen; Steve Byrnes
1999	June 13	Miller Lite 400	Michigan	CBS	Live	Mike Joy	Ned Jarrett; Buddy Baker	Dick Berggren; Ralph Sheheen; Bill Stephens
1999	June 20	Pocono 500	Pocono	TNN	Live	Eli Gold	Buddy Baker; Dick Berggren	Glenn Jarrett; Ralph Sheheen; Steve Byrnes
1999	June 27	Save Mart/Kragen 350	Sonoma	ESPN	Live	Bob Jenkins	Ned Jarrett; Benny Parsons	Jerry Punch; Bill Weber; John Kernan
1999	July 3	Pepsi 400	Daytona	CBS	Live	Mike Joy	Ned Jarrett; Buddy Baker	Dick Berggren; Ralph Sheheen; Bill Stephens
1999	July 11	Jiffy Lube 300	New Hampshire	TNN	Live	Eli Gold	Buddy Baker; Dick Berggren	Glenn Jarrett; Ralph Sheheen; Steve Byrnes
1999	July 25	Pennsylvania 500	Pocono	TBS	Live	Ken Squier	Buddy Baker; Dick Berggren	Marty Snider; Randy Pemberton; Mike Hogewood
1999	August 9	Brickyard 400	Indianapolis	ABC	Live	Bob Jenkins	Benny Parsons	Jerry Punch; Bill Weber; Ray Dunlap
1999	August 15	Frontier at The Glen	Watkins Glen	ESPN	Live	Bob Jenkins	Ned Jarrett	Jerry Punch; Bill Weber; John Kernan
1999	August 22	Pepsi 400	Michigan	ESPN	Live	Bob Jenkins	Ned Jarrett; Benny Parsons	Jerry Punch; Bill Weber; John Kernan
1999	August 28	Goody's Headache Powder 500	Bristol	ESPN	Live	Bob Jenkins	Ned Jarrett; Benny Parsons	Jerry Punch; Bill Weber; John Kernan
1999	September 5	The 50th Pepsi Southern 500	Darlington	ESPN	Live	Bob Jenkins	Ned Jarrett; Benny Parsons	Jerry Punch; Bill Weber; John Kernan
1999	September 11	Exide NASCAR Select Batteries 400	Richmond	ESPN	Live	Bob Jenkins	Ned Jarrett; Benny Parsons	Jerry Punch; Bill Weber; Ray Dunlap
1999	September 19	Dura Lube/Kmart 300	New Hampshire	TNN	Live	Eli Gold	Buddy Baker; Dick Berggren	Glenn Jarrett; Ralph Sheheen; Steve Byrnes
1999	September 26	MBNA Gold 400	Dover	TNN	Live	Eli Gold	Buddy Baker; Dick Berggren	Glenn Jarrett; Ralph Sheheen; Steve Byrnes
1999	October 3	NAPA Autocare 500	Martinsville	ESPN	Live	Bob Jenkins	Ned Jarrett; Benny Parsons	Jerry Punch; Bill Weber; John Kernan
1999	~~October 10~~; October 11	UAW-GM Quality 500	Charlotte	TBS	Live (Note: The 1999 UAW-GM Quality 500 was scheduled to be on October 10th but rescheduled on October 11th due to a rain delay.)	Allen Bestwick	Buddy Baker; Dick Berggren	Marty Snider; Steve Byrnes; Mike Hogewood
1999	October 17	Winston 500	Talladega	ESPN	Live	Jerry Punch	Ned Jarrett; Benny Parsons	Bill Weber; John Kernan; Ray Dunlap
1999	October 24	Pop Secret Microwave Popcorn 400	Rockingham	TNN	Live	Eli Gold	Buddy Baker; Dick Berggren	Glenn Jarrett; Ralph Sheheen; Steve Byrnes
1999	November 7	Checker Auto Parts/DuraLube 500	Phoenix	TNN	Live	Eli Gold	Buddy Baker; Dick Berggren	Glenn Jarrett; Ralph Sheheen; Steve Byrnes
1999	November 14	Pennzoil 400	Homestead–Miami	NBC	Live	Allen Bestwick	Joe Gibbs; Mike Wallace	Marty Snider; Dorsey Schroeder; Mike Massaro
1999	November 21	NAPA 500	Atlanta	ESPN	Live	Bob Jenkins	Ned Jarrett; Benny Parsons	Jerry Punch; Bill Weber; John Kernan

=== Busch ===
Year	Date	Event	Track	Network	Coverage	Commentary		Pit Reporters
Year	Date	Event	Track	Network	Coverage	Lap-by-lap	Color	Pit Reporters
1994	February 19	Goody's 300	Daytona	ESPN		Bob Jenkins	Benny Parsons; Ned Jarrett	John Kernan; Kyle Petty; Jerry Punch
1994	February 26	Goodwrench 200	North Carolina	TNN	Live	Mike Joy	Buddy Baker; Darrell Waltrip	Glenn Jarrett; Randy Pemberton
1994	March 5	Hardee's 250	Richmond	TNN	Live	Mike Joy	Darrell Waltrip	Glenn Jarrett; Randy Pemberton
1994	March 12	Busch Light 300	Atlanta	ESPN2		Jerry Punch	Benny Parsons; Brett Bodine	John Kernan; Kyle Petty
1994	March 20	Miller 500	Martinsville	TNN	Live	Mike Joy	Buddy Baker	Glenn Jarrett
1994	March 26	Mark III Vans 200	Darlington	ESPN		Jerry Punch	Benny Parsons; Ned Jarrett	John Kernan; Kyle Petty
1995	February 18	Goody's 300	Daytona	ESPN		Bob Jenkins	Benny Parsons; Kyle Petty	Jon Kernan; Jerry Punch
1995	February 25	Goodwrench 200	North Carolina	TNN		Mike Joy	Darrell Waltrip; Buddy Baker	Glenn Jarrett; Larry McReynolds; Randy Pemberton
1995	March 4	Hardee's 250	Richmond	TNN	Live	Mike Joy	Buddy Baker	Glenn Jarrett; Larry McReynolds; Randy Pemberton
1995	March 11	Busch Light 300	Atlanta	ESPN2		Jerry Punch	Benny Parsons; Ned Jarrett	John Kernan; Bill Weber
1995	March 17	Opryland USA 320	Nashville Fairgrounds	TNN		Mike Joy	Buddy Baker	Glenn Jarrett; Larry McReynolds; Ralph Sheheen
1995	March 25	Mark III Vans 200	Darlington	ESPN	Live	Jerry Punch	Benny Parsons; Ned Jarrett	John Kernan; Kyle Petty; Michael Waltrip
1995	April 1	Goody's 250	Bristol	ESPN2	Live	Jerry Punch	Benny Parsons; Ned Jarrett	John Kernan; Kyle Petty; Michael Waltrip
1995	April 15	Sundrop 400	Hickory	TNN		Mike Joy	Buddy Baker	Randy Pemberton
1995	May 13	NE Chevy Dealers 250	New Hampshire	TNN	Live	Mike Joy	Buddy Baker	Randy Pemberton
1995	May 21	Meridian Advantage 200	Nazareth	TNN		Ken Squier	P.J. Jones	Ralph Sheheen
1995	May 27	Red Dog 300	Charlotte	TBS		Ken Squier	Dick Berggren	Larry McReynolds; Randy Pemberton
1995	June 3	GM Goodwrench/Delco 200	Dover	TNN		Mike Joy	Buddy Baker; Darrell Waltrip	Glenn Jarrett; Larry McReynolds; Randy Pemberton
1995	June 10	Carolina Pride / Red Dog 250	Myrtle Beach	TNN		Ken Squier	David Pearson	Steve Byrnes
1995	June 25	Lysol 200	Watkins Glen	CBS	Live	Ken Squier	Ned Jarrett; Kenny Wallace	Mike Joy; Dick Berggren
1995	July 2	Sears Auto Center 250	Milwaukee	TNN	Live	Mike Joy	Buddy Baker	Glenn Jarrett
1995	July 22	Humminbird Kingfisher 500K	Talladega	TNN	Live	Mike Joy	Buddy Baker; Darrell Waltrip	Glenn Jarrett; Larry McReynolds
1995	July 29	Ford Credit 300	South Boston	TNN	Live	Mike Joy	Buddy Baker	Randy Pemberton
1995	August 4	Kroger 200	IRP	ESPN		Jerry Punch	Ned Jarrett	John Kernan; Bill Weber
1995	August 19	Detroit Gasket 200	Michigan	ESPN		Jerry Punch	Benny Parsons; Ned Jarrett	John Kernan; Kyle Petty; Bill Weber
1995	August 25	Food City 250	Bristol	ESPN		Jerry Punch	Benny Parsons; Ned Jarrett	John Kernan; Kyle Petty; Bill Weber
1995	September 2	Gatorade 200	Darlington	ESPN		Jerry Punch	Benny Parsons; Ned Jarrett	John Kernan; Kyle Petty; Bill Weber
1995	September 8	Autolite 250	Richmond	TNN	Live	Mike Joy	Buddy Baker; Larry McReynolds	Glenn Jarrett; Randy Pemberton
1995	September 16	MBNA 200	Dover	TNN	Live	Mike Joy	Buddy Baker; Darrell Waltrip	Glenn Jarrett; Larry McReynolds; Randy Pemberton
1995	October 7	All Pro Bumper to Bumper 300	Charlotte	TBS	Live	Ken Squier	Dick Berggren; Darrell Waltrip	Steve Byrnes; Larry McReynolds; Randy Pemberton
1995	October 21	AC-Delco 200	North Carolina	TNN	Live	Mike Joy	Buddy Baker; Darrell Waltrip	Glenn Jarrett; Randy Pemberton
1995	November 5	Jiffy Lube Miami 300	Homestead–Miami	CBS	Live	Ken Squier	Ned Jarrett; Geoff Bodine	Mike Joy; Dick Berggren
1996	February 17	Goody's Headache Powder 300	Daytona	ESPN	Live	Bob Jenkins	Benny Parsons; Kyle Petty	Jerry Punch; Bill Weber
1996	February 24	Goodwrench Service 200	Rockingham	TNN	Live	Eli Gold	Buddy Baker; Darrell Waltrip	Glenn Jarrett; Randy Pemberton
1996	March 2	Hardee's Fried Chicken 250	Richmond	ESPN2	Live	Jerry Punch	Ned Jarrett; Benny Parsons	Bill Weber; Kyle Petty
1996	March 9	Busch Light 300	Atlanta	ESPN2	Delayed	Jerry Punch	Ned Jarrett; Benny Parsons	Bill Weber; Kyle Petty
1996	March 17	BellSouth Mobility / Opryland USA 320	Nashville	TNN	Live	Mike Joy	Buddy Baker	Randy Pemberton
1996	March 23	Dura Lube 200	Darlington	ESPN	Live	Jerry Punch	Ned Jarrett; Benny Parsons	Bill Weber; Kyle Petty
1996	March 30	Goody's Headache Powder 250	Bristol	ESPN2	Live	Jerry Punch	Ned Jarrett; Benny Parsons	Bill Weber; Kyle Petty
1996	April 6	Sundrop 300	Hickory	TNN	Live	Eli Gold	Buddy Baker	Glenn Jarrett; Larry McReynolds
1996	May 19	CoreStates / Meridian Advantage 200	Nazareth	TNN	Live	Mike Joy	Barry Dodson	Steve Byrnes
1996	June 1	GM Goodwrench / Delco 200	Dover	TNN	Live	Eli Gold	Buddy Baker; Darrell Waltrip	Glenn Jarrett; Randy Pemberton
1996	June 8	Winston Motorsports 300	South Boston	TNN	Live	Mike Joy	Buddy Baker	Randy Pemberton
1996	June 22	Advance Auto Parts 250	Myrtle Beach	TNN	Live	Rick Benjamin	Chuck Bown	Randy Pemberton
1996	June 30	Lysol 200	Watkins Glen	CBS	Live	Ken Squier	Ned Jarrett; Larry McReynolds	Dick Berggren; Bill Stephens
1996	July 7	Sears Auto Center 250	Milwaukee	TNN	Live	Eli Gold	Buddy Baker; Bill Venturini	Glenn Jarrett
1996	~~May 12~~; July 12	Stanley 200	New Hampshire	TNN	Live (Note: The 1996 Stanley 200 was scheduled to be on May 12th but rescheduled on July 12th due to a rain delay.)	Eli Gold	Buddy Baker; Darrell Waltrip	Glenn Jarrett; Randy Pemberton
1996	July 27	Humminbird Fishfinder 500K	Talladega	CBS	Live	Ken Squier	Ned Jarrett; Darrell Waltrip	Mike Joy; David Hobbs; Dick Berggren
1996	September 14	MBNA 200	Dover	TNN	Live	Rick Benjamin	Buddy Baker; Darrell Waltrip	Glenn Jarrett; Steve Byrnes; Larry McReynolds
1996	October 19	AC-Delco 200	Rockingham	TNN	Live	Rick Benjamin	Buddy Baker; Darrell Waltrip	Glenn Jarrett; Randy Pemberton
1996	November 3	Jiffy Lube Miami 300	Homestead–Miami	CBS	Live	Ken Squier	Ned Jarrett; Larry McReynolds	Dick Berggren; Ralph Sheheen
1997	February 15	Gargoyles 300	Daytona	CBS	Live	Ken Squier	Ned Jarrett; Darrell Waltrip	Mike Joy; Dick Berggren; Ralph Sheheen
1997	February 22	GM Goodwrench Service Plus 200	Rockingham	TNN	Live	Mike Joy	Buddy Baker; Darrell Waltrip	Glenn Jarrett; Steve Byrnes; Chad Little
1997	March 1	Hardee's Fried Chicken 250	Richmond	ESPN2	Live	Jerry Punch	Ned Jarrett; Benny Parsons	Bill Weber; Ray Dunlap; Kyle Petty
1997	March 8	Stihl Outdoor Power Tools 300	Atlanta	ESPN2	Live	Jerry Punch	Ned Jarrett; Benny Parsons	Bill Weber; Kyle Petty
1997	March 16	Las Vegas 300	Las Vegas	TNN	Live	Eli Gold	Dick Berggren; Larry McReynolds	Glenn Jarrett; Matt Yocum
1997	March 22	Diamond Hill Plywood 200	Darlington	ESPN	Live	Jerry Punch	Ned Jarrett; Benny Parsons	Bill Weber; Ray Dunlap; Kyle Petty
1997	March 29	Galaxy Foods 300	Hickory	TNN	Live	Eli Gold	Buddy Baker; Larry McReynolds	Matt Yocum
1997	April 5	Coca-Cola 300	Texas	CBS	Live	Ken Squier	Ned Jarrett; Darrell Waltrip	Mike Joy; Dick Berggren; Ralph Sheheen
1997	April 12	Moore's Snacks 250	Bristol	ESPN	Live	Jerry Punch	Ned Jarrett; Benny Parsons	Bill Weber; Kyle Petty
1997	April 19	BellSouth Mobility / Opryland 320	Nashville	TNN	Live	Mike Joy	Buddy Baker	Mike Hogewood; Matt Yocum
1997	April 26	Touchstone Energy 300	Talladega	ESPN	Live	Jerry Punch	Ned Jarrett; Benny Parsons	Bill Weber; Ray Dunlap
1997	May 10	United States Cellular 200	New Hampshire	TNN	Live	Eli Gold	Buddy Baker	Glenn Jarrett; Matt Yocum
1997	May 18	First Union 200	Nazareth	ESPN	Live	Bob Jenkins	Benny Parsons	Bill Weber; Ray Dunlap
1997	May 24	Carquest Auto Parts 300	Charlotte	TBS	Live	Ken Squier	Darrell Waltrip	Dick Berggren; Steve Byrnes; Paddy Moise; Chad Little
1997	May 31	GM Goodwrench / Delco Battery 200	Dover	TNN	Live	Eli Gold	Darrell Waltrip; Dick Berggren	Glenn Jarrett; Matt Yocum; Chad Little
1997	June 13	Winston Motorsports 300	South Boston	TNN	Live	Eli Gold	Patty Moise; Barry Dodson	Glenn Jarrett
1997	June 29	Lysol 200	Watkins Glen	TNN	Live	Eli Gold	Larry McReynolds	Glenn Jarrett; Matt Yocum
1997	July 6	Sears Auto Center 250	Milwaukee	CBS	Live	Mike Joy	Ned Jarrett; Buddy Baker	Dick Berggren; Ralph Sheheen
1997	July 12	Advance Auto Parts 250	Myrtle Beach	TNN	Live	Rick Benjamin	Patty Moise; Bill Venturini	Mike Hogewood
1997	July 26	Gateway 300	Gateway	CBS	Live	Ken Squier	Ned Jarrett; Buddy Baker	Dick Berggren; Ralph Sheheen
1997	July 31	Kroger 200 presented by Ziploc	IRP	ESPN	Live	Jerry Punch	Brett Bodine	Bill Weber; Dave Despain
1997	August 16	Detroit Gasket 200	Michigan	ESPN	Live	Jerry Punch	Ned Jarrett; Benny Parsons	Bill Weber; Kyle Petty
1997	August 22	Food City 250	Bristol	ESPN	Live	Jerry Punch	Ned Jarrett; Benny Parsons	Bill Weber; Kyle Petty
1997	August 30	Dura-Lube 200 Presented by BI-LO	Darlington	ESPN	Live	Jerry Punch	Ned Jarrett; Benny Parsons	Bill Weber; John Kernan; Kyle Petty
1997	September 5	Autolite Platinum 250	Richmond	ESPN	Live	Jerry Punch	Ned Jarrett; Benny Parsons	Bill Weber; Ray Dunlap
1997	September 20	MBNA Gold 200	Dover	TNN	Live	Rick Benjamin	Buddy Baker; Darrell Waltrip	Glenn Jarrett; Steve Byrnes; Chad Little
1997	October 3	All Pro Bumper to Bumper 300	Charlotte	TBS	Live	Ken Squier	Buddy Baker; Darrell Waltrip	Allen Bestwick; Mike Hogewood; Steve Byrnes; Chad Little
1997	October 19	Kenwood Home & Car Audio 300	California	ESPN	Live	Jerry Punch	Benny Parsons; Kyle Petty	Bill Weber; Marty Reid
1997	October 25	AC Delco 200	Rockingham	TNN	Live	Rick Benjamin	Buddy Baker; Chad Little	Glenn Jarrett; Matt Yocum
1997	November 9	Jiffy Lube Miami 300	Homestead–Miami	CBS	Live	Mike Joy	Ned Jarrett; Larry McReynolds	Dick Berggren; Ralph Sheheen
1998	February 15	NAPA Auto Parts 300	Daytona	CBS	Live	Mike Joy	Ned Jarrett; Buddy Baker	Dick Berggren; Ralph Sheheen; Bill Stephens
1998	February 21	GM Goodwrench Service Plus 200	Rockingham	TNN	Live	Rick Benjamin	Buddy Baker; Darrell Waltrip	Glenn Jarrett; Steve Byrnes
1998	February 28	Sam's Town Las Vegas 300	Las Vegas	ESPN	Live	Jerry Punch	Benny Parsons; Kyle Petty	Bill Weber; Ray Dunlap
1998	March 15	BellSouth Mobility / Opryland 320	Nashville	TNN	Live	Eli Gold	Buddy Baker; Larry McReynolds	Steve Byrnes; Randy Pemberton
1998	March 21	Diamond Hill Plywood 200	Darlington	ESPN	Live	Jerry Punch	Benny Parsons; Kyle Petty	Bill Weber; Ray Dunlap
1998	March 28	Moore's Snacks 250	Bristol	ESPN	Live	Bob Jenkins	Benny Parsons; Kyle Petty	Bill Weber; Ray Dunlap
1998	April 5	Coca-Cola 300	Texas	CBS	Live	Mike Joy	Ned Jarrett; Buddy Baker	Dick Berggren; Ralph Sheheen; Bill Stephens
1998	April 11	Galaxy Food Centers 300	Hickory	TNN	Live	Eli Gold	Buddy Baker; Larry McReynolds	Glenn Jarrett; Steve Byrnes
1998	April 25	Touchstone Energy 300	Talladega	ABC	Live	Jerry Punch	Benny Parsons; Kyle Petty	Bill Weber; Jack Arute
1998	May 9	Gumout Long Life Formula 200	New Hampshire	TNN	Live	Eli Gold	Buddy Baker; Dick Berggren	Glenn Jarrett; Matt Yocum
1998	May 17	First Union 200	Nazareth	ESPN2	Live	Bob Jenkins	Benny Parsons	Bill Weber; Ray Dunlap
1998	May 23	Carquest Auto Parts 300	Charlotte	TBS	Live	Ken Squier	Buddy Baker; Darrell Waltrip	Allen Bestwick; Mike Hogewood; Steve Byrnes; Randy Pemberton; Larry McReynolds
1998	May 30	MBNA Platinum 200	Dover	TNN	Live	Eli Gold	Buddy Baker; Darrell Waltrip	Glenn Jarrett; Matt Yocum
1998	June 5	Hardee's 250	Richmond	ESPN2	Live	Jerry Punch	Benny Parsons; Kyle Petty	Bill Weber; Ray Dunlap
1998	June 14	Lycos.com 250	Pikes Peak	ESPN	Live	Jerry Punch	Steve Park	John Kernan; Marty Reid
1998	June 28	Lysol 200	Watkins Glen	ESPN	Live	Dave Despain	Steve Park	Marty Reid; Ray Dunlap
1998	July 5	DieHard 250	Milwaukee	TNN	Live	Eli Gold	Buddy Baker; Larry McReynolds	Steve Byrnes; Randy Pemberton
1998	July 11	Myrtle Beach 250	Myrtle Beach	TNN	Live	Rick Benjamin	Larry Pearson	Randy Pemberton; Mike Hogewood
1998	July 19	Kenwood Home & Car Audio 300	California	ESPN	Live	Jerry Punch	Benny Parsons	Bill Weber; Ray Dunlap
1998	July 25	Textilease/Medique 300	South Boston	TNN	Live	Mike Hogewood	Larry Pearson	Glenn Jarrett; Matt Yocum
1998	July 31	Kroger 200	IRP	ESPN	Live	Jerry Punch	Chad Little	Bill Weber; Marty Reid
1998	August 15	Pepsi 200 Presented by DeVilbiss	Michigan	ESPN	Live	Jerry Punch	Benny Parsons; Kyle Petty	Bill Weber; Ray Dunlap
1998	August 21	Food City 250	Bristol	ESPN	Live	Jerry Punch	Benny Parsons; Kyle Petty	Bill Weber; Ray Dunlap
1998	September 5	Dura-Lube 200 Presented by BI-LO	Darlington	ESPN	Live	Jerry Punch	Benny Parsons; Kyle Petty	Bill Weber; Ray Dunlap
1998	September 11	Autolite Platinum 250	Richmond	ESPN	Live	Jerry Punch	Benny Parsons; Kyle Petty	Bill Weber; Ray Dunlap
1998	September 19	MBNA Gold 200	Dover	TNN	Live	Eli Gold	Buddy Baker; Darrell Waltrip	Glenn Jarrett; Matt Yocum
1998	October 3	All Pro Bumper to Bumper 300	Charlotte	TBS	Live	Ken Squier	Buddy Baker; Darrell Waltrip	Allen Bestwick; Steve Byrnes; Mike Hogewood
1998	October 17	Carquest Auto Parts 250	Gateway	CBS	Live	Mike Joy	Ned Jarrett	Ralph Sheheen; Bill Stephens
1998	October 31	AC Delco 200	Rockingham	TNN	Live	Rick Benjamin	Buddy Baker; Darrell Waltrip	Glenn Jarrett; Matt Yocum; Larry McReynolds
1998	~~March 7~~; November 7	Yellow Freight 300	Atlanta	ESPN2; ESPN	Live (Note: The 1998 Yellow Freight 300 was scheduled to on March 7th and aired on ESPN2 but was rain delayed and with it continuing into Monday meant the race was rescheduled to November 7th and aired on ESPN.)	Jerry Punch	Benny Parsons; Kyle Petty	Bill Weber; Ray Dunlap
1998	November 15	Jiffy Lube Miami 300	Homestead–Miami	ESPN	Live	Jerry Punch	Benny Parsons; Kyle Petty	Bill Weber; Ray Dunlap
1999	February 13	NAPA Auto Parts 300	Daytona	CBS	Live	Mike Joy	Ned Jarrett; Buddy Baker	Dick Berggren; Ralph Sheheen; Bill Stephens
1999	February 20	Alltel 200	Rockingham	TNN	Live	Eli Gold	Buddy Baker; Darrell Waltrip	Glenn Jarrett; Ralph Sheheen; Larry McReynolds
1999	March 6	Sam's Town 300	Las Vegas	ESPN2	Live	Jerry Punch	Benny Parsons; Kyle Petty	Bill Weber; Ray Dunlap
1999	March 13	Yellow Freight 300	Atlanta	ESPN	Live	Jerry Punch	Benny Parsons; Kyle Petty	Bill Weber; Ray Dunlap
1999	March 20	Diamond Hill Plywood 200	Darlington	ESPN	Live	Jerry Punch	Ned Jarrett; Kyle Petty	Bill Weber; Ray Dunlap
1999	March 27	Coca-Cola 300	Texas	CBS; TNN	Live (Note: The 1999 Coca-Cola 300 saw coverage move from CBS to TNN due to a rain delay. TNN used CBS's graphics and commentary for the rest of the race.)	Mike Joy	Ned Jarrett; Buddy Baker	Dick Berggren; Ralph Sheheen; Bill Stephens
1999	April 3	BellSouth Mobility 320	Nashville	CBS	Live	Mike Joy	Ned Jarrett; Buddy Baker	Dick Berggren; Ralph Sheheen
1999	April 10	Moore's Snacks 250	Bristol	ESPN	Live	Jerry Punch	Benny Parsons; Kyle Petty	Bill Weber; Ray Dunlap
1999	April 24	Touchstone Energy 300	Talladega	ABC	Live	Jerry Punch	Benny Parsons; Kyle Petty	Bill Weber; Ray Dunlap
1999	May 1	Auto Club 300	California	ABC; ESPN2 (Note: The 1999 Auto Club 300 saw coverage move from ABC to ESPN2 due to ABC airing the 125th Kentucky Derby.)	Live	Jerry Punch	Benny Parsons; Kyle Petty	Bill Weber; Ray Dunlap
1999	May 8	Busch 200	New Hampshire	TNN	Live	Eli Gold	Buddy Baker; Dick Berggren	Glenn Jarrett; Larry McReynolds
1999	May 14	Hardee's 250	Richmond	ESPN2	Live	Jerry Punch	Benny Parsons; Kyle Petty	Bill Weber; Ray Dunlap
1999	May 23	First Union 200	Nazareth	ESPN2	Live	Ray Dunlap	Kyle Petty	Bill Weber; Matt Yocum
1999	May 29	Carquest Auto Parts 300	Charlotte	TBS	Live	Ken Squier	Buddy Baker; Rusty Wallace	Marty Snider; Mike Hogewood; Alice Cook
1999	June 5	MBNA Platinum 200	Dover	TNN	Live	Eli Gold	Buddy Baker; Darrell Waltrip	Glenn Jarrett; Ralph Sheheen
1999	June 12	Textilease/Medique 300	South Boston	TNN	Live	Eli Gold	Glenn Jarrett	Steve Byrnes; Mike Hogewood
1999	June 27	Lysol 200	Watkins Glen	ESPN	Live	Marty Reid	Jeremy Dale	Dave Burns; Amy East
1999	July 4	DieHard 250	Milwaukee	TNN	Live	Eli Gold	Buddy Baker; Larry McReynolds	Glenn Jarrett; Steve Byrnes
1999	July 17	Myrtle Beach 250	Myrtle Beach	TNN	Live	Eli Gold	Larry McReynolds	Glenn Jarrett; Mike Hogewood
1999	July 24	NAPA Autocare 250	Pikes Peak	ESPN2	Live	Bob Jenkins	Benny Parsons	Jerry Punch; Ray Dunlap
1999	July 31	Carquest Auto Parts 250	Gateway	TNN	Live	Eli Gold	Buddy Baker	Glenn Jarrett; Larry McReynolds
1999	August 6	Kroger 200	IRP	ESPN	Live	Jerry Punch	Ned Jarrett	Marty Reid; Dave Burns
1999	August 21	NAPA 200	Michigan	ESPN	Live	Jerry Punch	Benny Parsons; Kyle Petty	Bill Weber; Ray Dunlap
1999	August 27	Food City 250	Bristol	ESPN2	Live	Jerry Punch	Benny Parsons; Kyle Petty	Bill Weber; Ray Dunlap
1999	September 4	Dura Lube 200	Darlington	ESPN2	Live	Jerry Punch	Benny Parsons; Kyle Petty	Bill Weber; Ray Dunlap
1999	September 10	Autolite Platinum 250	Richmond	ESPN	Live	Jerry Punch	Benny Parsons; Kyle Petty	Bill Weber; Ray Dunlap
1999	September 23	MBNA Gold 200	Dover	TNN	Live	Mike Joy	Buddy Baker; Darrell Waltrip	Glenn Jarrett; Ralph Sheheen; Larry McReynolds
1999	October 9	All Pro Bumper to Bumper 300	Charlotte	TBS	Live	Allen Bestwick	Buddy Baker; Rusty Wallace	Marty Snider; Steve Byrnes; Mike Hogewood
1999	October 23	Kmart 200	Rockingham	TNN	Live	Mike Joy	Buddy Baker; Darrell Waltrip	Glenn Jarrett; Ralph Sheheen; Larry McReynolds
1999	October 30	Sam's Town 250	Memphis	TNN	Live	Eli Gold	Buddy Baker	Glenn Jarrett; Larry McReynolds
1999	November 6	Outback Steakhouse 200	Phoenix	TNN	Live	Mike Joy	Buddy Baker; Darrell Waltrip	Glenn Jarrett; Steve Byrnes; Larry McReynolds
1999	November 13	HotWheels.com 300	Homestead–Miami	NBC	Live	Allen Bestwick	Joe Gibbs; Mike Wallace	Marty Snider; Dorsey Schroeder; Mike Massaro

=== Trucks ===
Year	Date	Event	Track	Network	Commentary		Pit Reporters
Year	Date	Event	Track	Network	Lap-by-lap	Color	Pit Reporters
1994	November 20	Supertruck Winter Heat 200 No. 1	Tucson	TNN	Mike Joy	Buddy Baker	Glenn Jarrett
1994	December 11	Supertruck Winter Heat 200 No. 2	Tucson	TNN	Mike Joy	Buddy Baker	Glenn Jarrett
1995	January 8	Supertruck Winter Heat 200 No. 3	Tucson	TNN	Mike Joy	Buddy Baker	Glenn Jarrett
1995	February 5	Skoal Bandit Copper World Classic	Phoenix	TNN	Mike Joy	Buddy Baker; Ernie Irvan	Glenn Jarrett
1995	April 8	Racing Champions 200	Tucson	ESPN	Dave Despain	Elton Sawyer	Marty Reid
1995	April 15	Scott Irvin Chevrolet/Craftsman 200	Saugus	TNN	Glenn Jarrett	Larry McReynolds	Ralph Sheheen
1995	April 22	Ford Credit 125	Mesa Marin	ABC	Paul Page	Jack Arute	Phil Parsons
1995	May 5	Maxx Race Cards 200	Portland	TNN	Mike Joy	Glenn Jarrett	Ralph Sheheen
1995	May 13	Jerr Dan/Nelson 150	Evergreen	TNN	Glenn Jarrett	Barry Dodson	Ralph Sheheen
1995	May 27	Western Auto 200	I-70	TNN	Mike Joy	Glenn Jarrett	Ralph Sheheen
1995	June 3	Ford Credit 200	Louisville	ESPN	Dave Despain	Benny Parsons	Marty Reid
1995	June 23	Pizza Plus 150	Bristol	ESPN	Dave Despain	Benny Parsons	Marty Reid
1995	July 1	Sears Auto Center 125	Milwaukee	CBS	Ken Squier	Ned Jarrett; Kenny Wallace	Dick Berggren; Mike Joy
1995	July 15	Total Petroleum 200	Colorado	CBS	Ken Squier	Ned Jarrett	Dick Berggren; Mike Joy
1995	July 29	Heartland Tailgate 175	Topeka	TNN	Rick Benjamin	Ernie Irvan; Larry McReynolds	Glenn Jarrett; Ralph Sheheen
1995	August 3	Action Packed Racing Cards 150	IRP	ESPN	Dave Despain	Benny Parsons; Ned Jarrett	Marty Reid
1995	August 19	Stevens Beil/Genuine Car Parts 150	Flemington	TNN	Mike Joy	Glenn Jarrett	Randy Pemberton
1995	September 7	Fas Mart Supertruck Shootout	Richmond	ESPN2	Dave Despain	Benny Parsons	Marty Reid
1995	September 25	Goody's 150	Martinsville	ESPN2	Dave Despain	Benny Parsons	Marty Reid
1995	September 30	Goody's 150	North Wilkesboro	ESPN	Dave Despain	Benny Parsons	Marty Reid
1995	October 7	Subway 100	Sears Point	TNN	Mike Joy	Glenn Jarrett	Ralph Sheheen
1995	October 15	Spears Manufacturing 200	Mesa Marin	TNN	Glenn Jarrett	Larry McReynolds	Steve Byrnes
1995	October 28	GM Goodwrench/Delco Battery 200	Phoenix	TNN	Mike Joy	Buddy Baker; Darrell Waltrip	Glenn Jarrett; Larry McReynolds; Randy Pemberton
1995	November 4	NASCAR Supertruck 25	Homestead	TBS	Ken Squier	Dick Berggren	Steve Byrnes; Randy Pemberton
1996	March 17	Florida Dodge Dealers 400	Homestead	TNN	Eli Gold	Dick Berggren; Larry McReynolds	Glenn Jarrett
1996	April 21	Chevrolet Desert Star 300	Phoenix	TNN	Eli Gold	Dick Berggren	Glenn Jarrett
1996	May 4	Craftsman 200	Portland	TBS	Ken Squier	Dick Berggren	Steve Byrnes; Randy Pemberton
1996	May 11	Jerr-Dan/Nelson Truck 200	Evergreen	TBS	Ken Squier	Dick Berggren; Larry McReynolds	Steve Byrnes; Randy Pemberton
1996	May 25	NAPA 200	Tucson	ESPN	Dave Despain	Benny Parsons	Rick DeBruhl
1996	June 1	Colorado 250	Colorado	CBS	Ken Squier	Ned Jarrett	Dick Berggren; Mike Joy
1996	June 9	Lund Look 275	Topeka	TNN	Eli Gold	Larry McReynolds	Glenn Jarrett
1996	June 22	Coca-Cola 200	Bristol	ESPN	Dave Despain	Benny Parsons	Marty Reid
1996	June 30	DeVilbiss Superfinish 200	Nazareth	CBS; TNN	Mike Joy	Buddy Baker	Glenn Jarrett
1996	July 6	Sears Auto Center 200	Milwaukee	CBS	Ken Squier	Buddy Baker; Ned Jarrett	Dick Berggren; Mike Joy
1996	July 20	Ford Dealers 225	Louisville	CBS	Ken Squier	Buddy Baker; Ned Jarrett	Dick Berggren; Mike Joy
1996	July 27	Western Auto 200	I-70	TNN	Eli Gold	Buddy Baker	Randy Pemberton; Shawna Robinson
1996	August 1	Cummins 200	IRP	ESPN	Dave Despain	Benny Parsons	Marty Reid
1996	August 10	Stevens Beil/Genuine Parts 200	Flemington	TNN	Eli Gold	Buddy Baker	Randy Pemberton
1996	August 25	Parts America 150	Watkins Glen	ESPN	Dave Despain	Benny Parsons	Marty Reid
1996	August 31	Federated Auto Parts 250	Nashville Fairgrounds	TNN	Mike Joy	Buddy Baker	Randy Pemberton
1996	September 5	Fas Mart Truck Shootout	Richmond	ESPN2	Dave Despain	Benny Parsons	Marty Reid
1996	September 8	Pennzoil/VIP Tripleheader	New Hampshire	TNN	Eli Gold	Larry McReynolds	Glenn Jarrett; Matt Yocum
1996	September 21	Hanes 250	Martinsville	ESPN	Dave Despain	Benny Parsons; Kyle Petty	Marty Reid
1996	September 28	Lowe's 250	North Wilkesboro	ESPN	Dave Despain	Benny Parsons; Kyle Petty	Marty Reid
1996	October 5	Kragen 151	Sears Point	ESPN2	Dave Despain	Benny Parsons	Marty Reid
1996	October 13	Ford Dealers/Ford Credit 300	Mesa Marin	TNN	Eli Gold	Larry McReynolds	Glenn Jarrett
1996	October 26	GM Goodwrench/AC Delco 300	Phoenix	TBS	Ken Squier	Darrell Waltrip; Larry McReynolds	Dick Berggren; Steve Byrnes
1996	November 3	Carquest 420K	Las Vegas	CBS	Mike Joy	Buddy Baker	Glenn Jarrett; Bill Stephens
1997	January 19	Chevy Trucks Challenge	Walt Disney World	ESPN	Dave Despain	Marty Reid; Bill Weber	
1997	March 1	NAPA 200	Tucson	ESPN2	Dave Despain	Larry Rice	Marty Reid
1997	March 16	Florida Dodge Dealers 400	Homestead	TNN	Mike Joy	Buddy Baker	Steve Byrnes; Mike Hogewood
1997	April 20	Chevy Desert Star Classic	Phoenix	TNN	Eli Gold	Dorsey Schroeder	Steve Byrnes; Glenn Jarrett
1997	May 3	Craftsman 200	Portland	TBS	Ken Squier	Dick Berggren	Steve Byrnes; Mike Hogewood
1997	May 10	NAPACARD 200	Evergreen	TBS	Ken Squier	Dick Berggren	Steve Byrnes; Mike Hogewood
1997	May 24	Western Auto/Parts America 200	I-70	TNN	Eli Gold	Buddy Baker; Bill Venturini	Glenn Jarrett
1997	May 31	Pennzoil Discount Center 200	New Hampshire	TNN	Mike Joy	Buddy Baker	Mike Hogewood
1997	June 6	Pronto Auto Parts 400K	Texas	ESPN	Dave Despain	Benny Parsons	Jerry Punch; Marty Reid
1997	June 21	Loadhandler 200	Bristol	ESPN	Ray Dunlap	Phil Parsons	Larry Rice
1997	June 29	NAPA AutoCare 200	Nazareth	CBS	Mike Joy	Ned Jarrett; Buddy Baker	Dick Berggren; Ralph Sheheen
1997	July 5	Sears DieHard 200	Milwaukee	CBS	Eli Gold	Ned Jarrett; Buddy Baker	Dick Berggren; Mike Joy
1997	July 12	Link-Belt Construction Equipment 225	Louisville	CBS	Mike Joy	Ned Jarrett; Buddy Baker	Dick Berggren; Ralph Sheheen
1997	July 19	Colorado 250	Colorado	CBS	Mike Joy	Ned Jarrett; Buddy Baker	Dick Berggren; Bill Stephens
1997	July 27	Lund Look 275	Topeka	TNN	Eli Gold	Larry McReynolds	Glenn Jarrett
1997	July 31	Cummins 200	IRP	ESPN2	Dave Despain	Benny Parsons	Marty Reid
1997	August 9	Stevens Beil/Genuine Car Parts 200	Flemington	TNN	Eli Gold	Phil Parsons	Matt Yocum
1997	August 16	Federated Auto Parts 250	Nashville; Fairgrounds	TNN	Eli Gold	Buddy Baker	Glenn Jarrett
1997	August 24	Parts America 150	Watkins Glen	ESPN	Dave Despain	Benny Parsons	Marty Reid
1997	September 4	Virginia Is For Lovers 200	Richmond	ESPN2	Dave Despain	Benny Parsons	Marty Reid
1997	September 27	Hanes 250	Martinsville Speedway	TV coverage unknown			
1997	October 5	Kragen/Exide 151	Sonoma	ESPN2	Bob Jenkins	Benny Parsons	Marty Reid
1997	October 12	Dodge California Truck Stop 300	Mesa Marin	TNN	Eli Gold	Jeff Fuller	Glenn Jarrett
1997	October 18	The No Fear Challenge	California	ESPN2	Dave Despain	Benny Parsons	Jerry Punch; Marty Reid
1997	November 1	GM Goodwrench/Delco 300	Phoenix	TBS	Ken Squier	Buddy Baker; Darrell Waltrip	Allen Bestwick; Steve Byrnes; Larry McReynolds
1997	November 9	Carquest Auto Parts 420K	Las Vegas	CBS	Eli Gold	Buddy Baker	Glenn Jarrett; Bill Stephens
1998	January 18	Chevy Trucks Challenge	Walt Disney World	ESPN	Dave Despain	Benny Parsons	Marty Reid; Bill Weber
1998	April 4	Florida Dodge Dealers 400	Homestead	TNN	Eli Gold	Bill Venturini	Glenn Jarrett; Matt Yocum
1998	April 19	Chevy Trucks 150	Phoenix	Coverage unknown			
1998	April 25	Craftsman 200	Portland	TBS	Ken Squier	Buddy Baker	Steve Byrnes; Randy Pemberton
1998	May 9	NAPACARD 200	Evergreen	TBS	Ken Squier	Larry McReynolds	Allen Bestwick; Steve Byrnes
1998	May 23	Yellow Freight 200	I-70	TNN	Eli Gold	Bill Venturini	Glenn Jarrett; Matt Yocum
1998	May 30	Parts America 150	Watkins Glen	ESPN	Dave Despain	Benny Parsons	Marty Reid
1998	June 5	Pronto Auto Parts 400K	Texas	TNN	Eli Gold	Buddy Baker	Glenn Jarrett; Matt Yocum
1998	June 20	Loadhandler 200	Bristol	ESPN2	Dave Despain	Benny Parsons	Marty Reid
1998	July 4	DieHard 200	Milwaukee	CBS	Eli Gold	Buddy Baker; Randy LaJoie	Steve Byrnes; Glenn Jarrett
1998	July 11	NAPA Autocare 200	Nazareth	CBS	Mike Joy	Ned Jarrett	Ralph Sheheen; Bill Stephens
1998	July 18	The No Fear Challenge	California	ESPN	Dave Despain	Benny Parsons	Ray Dunlap; Bill Weber
1998	July 25	Tempus Resorts 300K	Pikes Peak	CBS	Mike Joy	Ned Jarrett; Buddy Baker	Dick Berggren; Ralph Sheheen
1998	July 30	Cummins 200	IRP	ESPN	Dave Despain	Benny Parsons	Marty Reid; Bill Weber
1998	August 2	Pennzoil/VIP Discount Auto Center 200	New Hampshire	TNN	Eli Gold	Buddy Baker; Larry McReynolds	Glenn Jarrett; Matt Yocum
1998	August 8	Stevens Beil/Genuine Car Parts 200	Flemington	TNN	Eli Gold	Buddy Baker	Glenn Jarrett; Matt Yocum
1998	August 15	Federated Auto Parts 250	Nashville Fairgrounds	TNN	Eli Gold	Buddy Baker	Glenn Jarrett; Matt Yocum
1998	August 23	Lund Look 275	Topeka	TNN	Eli Gold	Buddy Baker; Larry McReynolds	Glenn Jarrett; Matt Yocum
1998	August 29	Kroger 225	Louisville	ESPN	Dave Despain	Benny Parsons	Marty Reid
1998	September 10	Virginia Is For Lovers 200	Richmond	ESPN2	Dave Despain	Benny Parsons	Marty Reid; Bill Weber
1998	September 13	Memphis 200	Memphis	ESPN	Dave Despain	Dorsey Schroeder	Marty Reid
1998	September 19	Ram Tough 200	Gateway	TNN	Mike Joy	Chuck Bown	Mike Hogewood; Randy Pemberton
1998	September 26	NAPA 250	Martinsville	ESPN	Dave Despain	Benny Parsons; Kyle Petty	Ray Dunlap; Bill Weber
1998	October 11	Kragen/Exide 151	Sonoma	ESPN2	Dave Despain	Phil Parsons	Marty Reid
1998	October 19	Dodge California Truck Stop 300	Mesa Marin	TNN	Ken Squier	Chuck Bown	Bobby Gerould; Matt Yocum
1998	October 24	GM Goodwrench Service/AC Delco 300	Phoenix	TBS	Allen Bestwick	Buddy Baker; Dick Berggren	Steve Byrnes; Larry McReynolds
1998	November 8	Sam's Town 250	Las Vegas	ESPN2	Marty Reid	Dorsey Schroeder	Rick DeBruhl; Gary Gerould
1999	March 20	Florida Dodge Dealers 400K	Homestead	ABC	Marty Reid	Benny Parsons	Jon Beekhuis; Gary Gerould
1999	March 27	Chevy Trucks 150	Phoenix	ESPN	Marty Reid	Benny Parsons	Dave Burns; Amy East
1999	April 3	NAPACARD 200	Evergreen	ESPN	Marty Reid	Benny Parsons	Dave Burns; Amy East
1999	April 10	Dodge California Truck Stop 300	Mesa Marin	ESPN	Marty Reid	Jeremy Dale	Dave Burns; Amy East
1999	April 17	NAPA 250	Martinsville	ESPN2	Marty Reid	Benny Parsons; Kyle Petty	Dave Burns; Amy East
1999	May 8	Memphis 200	Memphis	ESPN	Marty Reid	Benny Parsons	Dave Burns; Amy East
1999	May 16	NAPA 300	Pikes Peak	ESPN	Marty Reid	Jeremy Dale	Dave Burns; Amy East
1999	May 22	O'Reilly Auto Parts 200	I-70	ESPN	Marty Reid	Benny Parsons	Dave Burns; Amy East
1999	June 5	Coca-Cola Family 200	Bristol	ESPN2	Marty Reid	Benny Parsons	Dave Burns; Amy East
1999	June 11	Pronto Auto Parts 400K	Texas	ESPN	Marty Reid	Jeremy Dale	Dave Burns; Amy East
1999	June 18	Grainger Industrial Supply 225K	Portland	ESPN	Marty Reid	Jeremy Dale	Dave Burns; Amy East
1999	June 26	Bully Hill Vineyards 150	Watkins Glen	ESPN	Marty Reid	Jeremy Dale	Dave Burns; Amy East
1999	July 3	DieHard 200	Milwaukee	CBS	Eli Gold	Rick Carelli	Steve Byrnes; Glenn Jarrett
1999	July 10	Federated Auto Parts 250	Nashville Fairgrounds	Not broadcast			
1999	July 18	NAPA AutoCare 200	Nazareth	CBS	Mike Joy	Ned Jarrett; Buddy Baker	Dick Berggren; Ralph Sheheen
1999	July 24	goracing.com 200	Michigan	ESPN	Marty Reid	Jeremy Dale	Dave Burns; Amy East
1999	August 1	Pennzoil/VIP Discount Auto Center 200	New Hampshire	ESPN	Marty Reid	Benny Parsons	Dave Burns; Amy East
1999	August 5	Power Stroke 200	IRP	ESPN	Marty Reid	Benny Parsons	Dave Burns; Amy East
1999	August 20	Ram Tough 200	Gateway	ESPN	Marty Reid	Jeremy Dale	Dave Burns; Amy East
1999	August 28	O'Reilly Auto Parts 275	Topeka	ESPN	Marty Reid	Jeremy Dale	Dave Burns; Amy East
1999	September 9	Virginia Is For Lovers 200	Richmond	ESPN2	Marty Reid	Benny Parsons	Dave Burns; Amy East
1999	September 24	Orleans 250	Las Vegas	ESPN	Marty Reid	Benny Parsons	Dave Burns; Amy East
1999	October 8	Kroger 225	Louisville	ESPN2	Marty Reid	Benny Parsons	Dave Burns; Amy East
1999	October 15	O'Reilly 300	Texas	ESPN	Marty Reid	Jeremy Dell	Dave Burns; Amy East
1999	October 30	NAPA Auto Parts 200	California	ESPN	Marty Reid	Benny Parsons	Dave Burns; Amy East

After years of trying to win it, Dale Earnhardt appeared headed for certain victory in the 1990 Daytona 500 until a series of events in the closing laps. On lap 193, Geoff Bodine spun in the first turn, causing the third and final caution of the race. Everyone pitted except Derrike Cope, who stayed out. On the lap 195 restart, Earnhardt retook and held the lead, only to puncture a tire when he drove over a piece of metal bell housing from the failed engine of Rick Wilson's car on Lap 199. As Earnhardt's damaged car slowed, Cope drove past and earned his first Cup Series victory. It was the first of two victories for the relatively unknown Cope in the 1990 season. In an ironic twist, KIRO-TV, the local CBS affiliate serving Cope's hometown at the time in the Seattle suburb of Spanaway, opted to pre-empt the race to telecast a Seattle SuperSonics basketball game, and the race was delayed until 3:00 p.m. Pacific Time because of the pre-emption.

SportsChannel America's coverage began in 1990. For instance, SportsChannel America broadcast the Roses Stores 200 and the Chevy Dealers of New England 250.

TBS broadcast the Richmond spring race, held the week after Daytona Speedweeks, from 1983 to 1995, as well as the fall races at Rockingham (1985-1987), Atlanta (1983-1985) and Riverside (1982-1987). For several years in the 1990s, the only Cup Series races aired on TBS were the two races from Charlotte Motor Speedway (Coca-Cola 600 from 1988-2000, UAW-GM Quality 500 from 1989-2000); TBS did not have rights to The Winston, which usually aired on TNN. Also, the channel aired the July race at Pocono Raceway from 1993 to 2000. TBS was also the home of the postseason exhibition races held at Suzuka Circuit and Twin Ring Motegi in Japan from 1996–1998. The now defunct Prime Network meanwhile, was the first to televise NASCAR Winston Cup qualifying races on a regular basis. The telecasts were mainly for races that would be televised by TBS.

- After SETN folded, one Pocono race a year was produced by Jim Wiglesworth on pay-per-view for Viewer's Choice (now In Demand) from 1988 to 1990. They were not a huge success, as fans were reluctant to pay for what they could see last week for free. The Viewer's Choice shows were noteworthy in that they premiered viewer phone-in questions during the races.

TNN started showing races live in 1991, but it had aired taped coverage of a few Winston Cup races in the 1980s on its American Sports Cavalcade program. TNN had a self-operating and self-promoting sub-division called TNN Motor Sports, and aired races produced by that division from 1991 to 2000. Under the TNN Motor Sports umbrella, NASCAR series races (including those of the then-Winston Cup Series and Busch Grand National Series, as well as the Craftsman Truck Series) were the most prominently featured, but races of smaller circuits such as the IMSA, ASA, USAC, the NHRA, and ARCA were also showcased, as was motorcycle and speedboat racing. TNN picked up several of the "second tier" Winston Cup races of the time, whose rights packages were allowed to expire by ESPN. Races at tracks such as Rockingham, Dover, Pocono, Loudon, and Phoenix, were among the events signed. In general, ESPN abandoned slower, longer, races which used large broadcast windows. 500-mile races at Rockingham, Dover and Pocono were known to last upwards of five hours, requiring a broadcast window as long as six hours (to include pre-race and post-race coverage). The races at Rockingham and Dover were shortened to 400 miles in 1995 and 1997, respectively, but remained part of the TNN lineup. TNN's relatively open schedule for Sunday afternoons allowed large NASCAR broadcast windows. TNN also picked up rights to The Winston when it was moved to prime time.

For 1992, Daytona 500 pole qualifying and the Busch Clash swapped days: the Busch Clash was held on Saturday, and qualifying was held Sunday. This move was made at the request of CBS, who wanted the additional time on Sunday for its coverage of the 1992 Winter Olympics. The network had aired the Busch Clash since it began in 1979. The race debuted on a Sunday, which CBS broadcast live. Pole position qualifying for the Daytona 500 would start Sunday at 10:00 a.m., followed by the Daytona ARCA 200. The Busch Clash would be held after the ARCA race at 3:00 p.m.

The 1994 Brickyard 400 broadcast was billed as "A Special Presentation of ABC Sports," and technically did not fall under the moniker of Wide World of Sports. Starting with the 1995 Indianapolis 500, ABC Sports started billing their races at Indy under the WWOS banner (that is, of course, not including 1965-1970). The 1995 BY400 shifted to tape delay on ESPN, so the first BY400 to be a WWOS presentation would be the 1996 race. That means that the "first...since" NASCAR race to be a WWOS presentation might have been the 1995 or 1996 spring race at Atlanta (Purolator 500). It is also worth noting that the first permanent "score bug" used on ABC for perhaps ANY sport broadcast was during the 1994 Purolator 500 (spring race) at Atlanta. It was a transparent digit counting down the number of laps left in the race. It was used 2 months later during the Indianapolis 500 (with a different font), then again at the 1994 BY400.

During its tenure on ABC, the Brickyard 400 was subject to the same broadcast policy as the Indianapolis 500, meaning that live coverage was blacked out on the local ABC station (WRTV), and the race was instead shown via same-day tape delay. The blackout ended in 2001, due to all television rights being centralized with NASCAR.

The Winter Heat Series, aired during the winter months between November and January (during NASCAR's offseason). The program began during the 1994-1995 winter and ran through the 1998-1999 winter. The races were held at the 3/8 mile Tucson Raceway Park in Tucson, Arizona. TNN originally broadcast the races before ESPN took over.

Speedvision launched on December 31, 1995. It was founded by Roger L. Werner, E. Roger Williams, Nickolas Rhodes, and Robert Scanlon; the network's original ownership included cable providers Cox Communications and Continental Cablevision, and AT&T Corporation. Speedvision's initial lineup featured various automotive programs, including various documentary-style series focusing on prolific vehicles, manufacturers, and racing teams (such as Victory by Design and Legends of Motorsport), series focusing on classic automobiles (such as Dream Car Garage, coverage of Barrett-Jackson's auctions, and My Classic Car, which moved to the network from TNN), an Autoweek-branded television series, along with MotorWeek and Autoline Detroit – two programs respectively syndicated from PBS member stations in Maryland and Detroit. Speedvision also carried coverage of various minor and professional auto racing series, including the Sports Car Club of America's World Challenge series (of which it also acquired title sponsorship of in 1999, becoming the Speedvision World Challenge).

In 1998, a CBS-televised race at Pikes Peak International Raceway in Fountain, Colorado, scheduled for 186 laps ran 12 extra laps (totaling 198) because of multiple attempts at a successful Green-White-Checkered Finish.

20 years after its Daytona 500 broadcast, CBS used at least 200 people and more than 80 cameras for their coverage:

- 33 in-car cameras - three cameras in 11 different cars.
- 10 "pole" cameras above the pits.
- 35 cameras around the track.
- A camera in a blimp.
- A camera with each of the three pit reporters.
- A camera in the booth.

CBS also planned to use more computerized graphics and a super slow-motion camera with a long lens.

- Prior to the original 1999 contract between NASCAR and NBC, the network aired races such as the National 500 at Charlotte Motor Speedway from 1979 to 1981, the 1981 Mountain Dew 500 at Pocono International Raceway, the Winston 500 at Alabama International Motor Speedway from 1983 to 1985, and the Miami 300 and Pennzoil 400 at Homestead–Miami Speedway in both 1999 and 2000.

== See also ==
- List of Daytona 500 broadcasters
- List of Wide World of Sports (American TV series) announcers
- List of events broadcast on Wide World of Sports (American TV program)
- NASCAR on television in the 1960s
  - NASCAR on television in the 1970s
  - NASCAR on television in the 1980s
  - NASCAR on television in the 2000s
  - NASCAR on television in the 2010s
  - NASCAR on television in the 2020s
