= Gunnar Örn Örlygsson =

Icelandic politician

Member of Alþingi
- In office 2003–2007

Personal details
- Born: 4 August 1971 Keflavík, Iceland
- Party: Independence Party; Liberal Party
- Basketball career

Personal information
- Listed height: 185 cm (6 ft 1 in)

Career information
- Playing career: 1987–2000

Career history
- 1987–1991: Njarðvík
- 1991: Þór Akureyri
- 1991–1993: Njarðvík
- 1993–1995: Valur
- 1995–1996: Njarðvík
- 1996–1997: KR
- 1999–2000: Njarðvík

Career highlights
- Icelandic champion (1991); 4× Icelandic Cup (1988, 1989, 1990, 1992); 2× Icelandic Super Cup (1995, 1999)

Career statistics
- Points: 741 (6.1 ppg)
- Games: 121

Gunnar Örn Örlygsson (born 4 August 1971) is a former Icelandic politician and former basketball player. He was a member of Alþingi from 2003 to 2007.

== Political career ==
Gunnar was a member of Alþingi for the Liberal Party from 2003 until he split from the party in 2005 and joined the Independence Party for whom he served as a parliamentarian until 2007.

== Basketball career ==
Gunnar played 11 seasons in the Icelandic top-tier Úrvalsdeild karla, averaging 6.1 points per game. He was the chairman of Ungmennafélag Njarðvíkur basketball department from 2014 to December 2016. In 1991, he won the three-point shooting contest at the Icelandic All-Star game.

== Personal life ==
Gunnar is the brother of former Icelandic national team players Sturla Örlygsson and Teitur Örlygsson. He is also uncle of Örlygur Aron Sturluson and Margrét Kara Sturludóttir who both played for the Icelandic national teams.
