= Orrin Thompson =

American gridiron football player (born 1982)

No. 69, 65, 50
- Position: Offensive Tackle

Personal information
- Born: November 11, 1982 (age 43); Camden, New Jersey, U.S.
- Listed height: 6 ft 6 in (1.98 m)
- Listed weight: 320 lb (145 kg)

Career information
- High school: Charlotte Christian (Charlotte, North Carolina)
- College: Duke
- NFL draft: 2005: undrafted

Career history
- Miami Dolphins (2005–2006)*; Green Bay Packers (2006–2007); New York Giants (2009)*; New York Sentinels (2009); Hartford Colonials (2010); Omaha Nighthawks (2011); Edmonton Eskimos (2012–2013)
- * Offseason or practice squad member only

Orrin Christopher Thompson (born November 11, 1982) is an American former professional football guard and offensive tackle. He was signed by the Miami Dolphins as an undrafted free agent in 2005. He played college football at Duke.

Thompson has been a member of the Green Bay Packers, New York Giants, New York Sentinels and Hartford Colonials. He is the older brother of NFL defensive end and former Packers teammate Jeremy Thompson.

== Professional career ==
=== Miami Dolphins ===
Thompson was signed by the Miami Dolphins as an undrafted free agent in April 2005. Despite playing defensive tackle in college, he was moved to the offensive line with the Dolphins. He was waived on August 30, 2005, and was subsequently signed to the team's practice squad, where he spent the entire season.

In 2006, Thompson was allocated to NFL Europa by the Dolphins but was unable to play due to injury. He was once again released following training camp and re-signed to the practice squad.

=== Green Bay Packers ===
Thompson was released from the Dolphins' practice squad during the 2006 season added to the practice squad of the Green Bay Packers, where he spent the rest of the season. On January 2, 2007, it was announced that the Packers signed Thompson to a future contract.

Thompson went to training camp with the Packers in 2007 and was placed on the practice squad to start the season. On September 22, he was promoted to the active roster. Thompson was inactive for all but one game during his stint on the active roster and dressed but did not play in the other. On October 18, he was released. The team re-signed him to the practice squad a few days later.

On January 3, 2008, the Packers promoted Thompson to the active roster again after offensive tackle Junius Coston was placed on injured reserve.

During the 2008 NFL draft the Packers selected Orrin's brother, Jeremy Thompson, in the fourth round. However, Orrin Thompson was waived by the Packers during final cuts on August 30, 2008.

=== New York Giants ===
After spending the 2008 regular season out of football, Thompson was signed by the New York Giants on January 14, 2009. He was waived on September 5, 2009.

=== UFL ===
Thompson started the 2009 UFL season at left tackle for the New York club. In 2010, he started at left tackle for the Hartford Colonials, after the New York franchise's shutdown. He was resigned for 2011 by the Colonials. However, the Colonials were contracted by the UFL on August 10, 2011, making Thompson a free agent. He was taken #1 overall by the Omaha nighthawks in the Colonials dispersal draft and started at right tackle. In 2012, he started at left tackle for the Edmonton Eskimos of the CFL but injured his knee the next season and subsequently retired.
