= Jeremy Thompson (American football) =

American football player (born 1985)

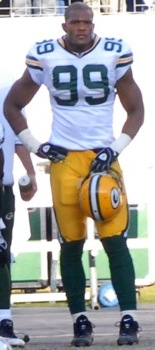
- Thompson with the Green Bay Packers in 2008

No. 99
- Position: Linebacker

Personal information
- Born: October 9, 1985 (age 41); Voorhees Township, New Jersey, U.S.
- Listed height: 6 ft 4 in (1.93 m)
- Listed weight: 270 lb (122 kg)

Career information
- High school: Charlotte Christian (Charlotte, North Carolina)
- College: Wake Forest
- NFL draft: 2008: 4th round, 102nd overall pick

Career history
- Green Bay Packers (2008–2009)

Career NFL statistics
- Total tackles: 9
- Stats at Pro Football Reference

Jeremy Cam Thompson (born October 9, 1985) is an American former professional football player who was a linebacker for the Green Bay Packers of the National Football League (NFL). He was selected by the Packers in the fourth round of the 2008 NFL draft. He played college football for the Wake Forest Demon Deacons. He is the younger brother of former New York Giants offensive lineman Orrin Thompson.

== Early life ==
Thompson played high school football at Charlotte Christian School. He was ranked 40th nationally at defensive end by Rivals.com and ranked 19th among North Carolina prospects. He was listed as the country's 37th-best defensive end by TheInsiders.com and also ranked 90th on the "Atlantic Hot 100" by the same publication.

== College career ==
Thompson played college football at Wake Forest. Thompson started 32 of 46 games that he played in at Wake Forest at right defensive end, recording 112 tackles (73 solos), including 8.5 sacks and 20.5 stops for losses. He added one quarterback pressure, two forced fumbles and eight pass deflections and he intercepted two passes for 86 yards in returns and a touchdown.

As a true freshman in 2004 he started three of the 11 games at right defensive end. During the season, he tallied 15 tackles (8 solos) with a sack and three stops for losses. He has an interception and one pass deflected. Thompson started his first 8 games of his 2005 sophomore campaign at right defensive end, but a left knee anterior cruciate ligament tear cost Thompson the final three games of the 2005 season. During those 8 games played he posted 21 tackles (15 solos) with two stops in the backfield and a pass deflection.

During his junior season, Thompson played in 14 games at right defensive end in but only started eight contests due to a shoulder contusion suffered in a late November battle with Maryland. During the season, he recorded 30 tackles (15 solos), a sack and 4.5 stops for losses. He broke up three passes and had a highlight 86-yard interception return for a touchdown vs. Connecticut. As a senior, Thompson led the team with 6.5 sacks and ranked second on the squad with 11 stops in the backfield. He finished sixth on the team with 46 tackles (35 solos). He also caused two fumbles and batted down three passes. He was one of 10 finalists for the National Sportsmanship Award, given to the college player who best personifies the spirit of sportsmanship.

== Professional career ==
Pre-draft measurables
Height	Weight	40-yard dash	10-yard split	20-yard split	20-yard shuttle	Three-cone drill	Vertical jump	Broad jump	Bench press
6 ft 4 3/8 in (1.94 m)	264 lb (120 kg)	4.75 s	1.58 s	2.72 s	4.23 s	6.97 s	32 in (0.81 m)	9 ft 9 in (2.97 m)	25 reps
All values from NFL Combine.

Thompson was selected by the Green Bay Packers in the fourth round (pick 102) of the 2008 NFL draft. On December 30, 2009, Thompson was placed on injured reserve due to a neck injury. On April 26, 2010, Thompson reported he would be retiring due to an undisclosed medical condition.

=== Statistics ===
Year	Team	Games	Tackle	FF	FR	INT	Yards	TD
2008	Green Bay Packers	9	8	0	0	0	0	0
2009	Green Bay Packers	6	1	0	0	0	0	0

== Personal life ==
He graduated from medical school at University of North Carolina. He married his college sweetheart Adele (Mitchell) in March 2010 and they moved to Rochester, Minnesota with their 5 children. He completed his orthopedic surgery residency at the Mayo Clinic in 2022. He has completed an Orthopedic Spine Surgical Fellowship in Louisville, Kentucky. He currently works for OrthoCarolina in Charlotte, North Carolina.
