= Steve Byrnes =

American television announcer (1959–2015)

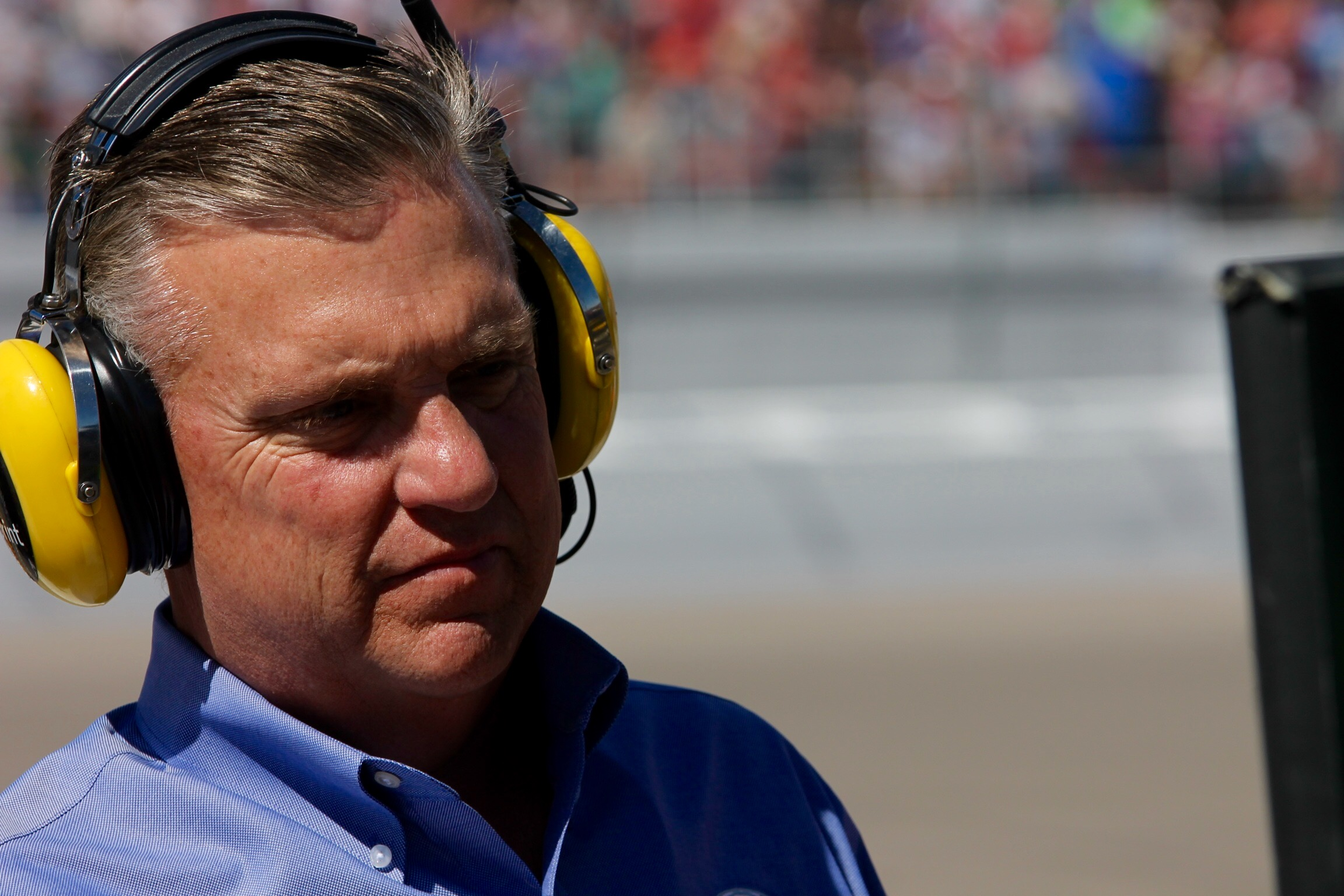
- Byrnes at Las Vegas Motor Speedway in 2014
- Born: Steven Patrick Byrnes; April 14, 1959; Chicago, Illinois, U.S.
- Died: April 21, 2015 (aged 56); Fort Mill, South Carolina, U.S.
- Education: University of Maryland
- Occupations: Television host, producer, pit reporter
- Years active: 1982–2014
- Employer: Fox Sports
- Spouse: Karen (née Goins) (m. 1992)
- Children: 1

Steven Patrick Byrnes (April 14, 1959 – April 21, 2015) was an American television announcer and producer.

After graduating from college, he began his career as a sports producer, covering several NFL teams. In 1985, he began his involvement with auto racing, including most prominently NASCAR. In 2001, he began working with NASCAR on Fox as a pit reporter, and later became the host of Speed/Fox Sports 1's studio show NASCAR Race Hub.

In October 2014, Byrnes took a medical leave from Fox Sports after being diagnosed with a reoccurrence of head and neck cancer. He later died on April 21, 2015, at the age of 56 in Fort Mill, South Carolina.

== Early life ==
Steven Patrick "Steve" Byrnes was born on April 14, 1959, in Chicago, Illinois and raised in New Carrollton, Maryland. He was the eldest of five siblings. He graduated from Largo High School in 1977, where he was a quarterback on the football team and pitcher on the baseball team, and from the University of Maryland in 1981. As a senior, he served as an intern for WJLA in nearby Washington.

== Television career ==
Byrnes began his television career shortly after graduating college. He was first hired as a weekend sports producer where he covered the Washington Redskins, Washington Bullets, Maryland, Georgetown, the Baltimore Orioles, and other sports. In November 1982, he had his first opportunity to be an on-air personality, when he was hired at Sullivan's Island, South Carolina-based WCIV. While employed there he was a sports reporter and weekend anchor for the NBC affiliate until January 1985.

Afterward, Sunbelt Video hired him, in which he hosted the NASCAR newsmagazine Inside Winston Cup with Ned Jarrett, which marked the beginning of producing and hosting NASCAR segments. He announced what was happening on pit road for World Sports Enterprises, and later worked for TBS, TNN (now Paramount Network) and CBS. He was a backup pit commentator for Monster Jam on TNN. In 2006, he was given an extra assignment as one of the network's available play-by-play broadcasters for Fox's NFL broadcasts, joining Bill Maas for selected games.

From 2001 until 2014, he was a pit reporter for Fox NASCAR. He also served as a fill-in studio host and lap-by-lap announcer whenever Chris Myers or Mike Joy, respectively, were not available. From 2001 to 2003 he also served as host of Totally NASCAR on Fox Sports Net, earning a Sports Emmy nomination for best daily studio show in 2002. As of 2014, Byrnes was the co-host of NASCAR Race Hub on Fox Sports 1 and was expected to be the lead announcer for the Camping World Truck Series in 2015.

== Cancer diagnosis and death ==
In late August 2013, Byrnes was diagnosed with an early stage of head and neck cancer. After chemotherapy for the rest of the year, Byrnes was deemed cancer-free in early 2014. However, later that year in September, he was diagnosed with a recurrence of stage 4 head and neck cancer; on October 9, Fox Sports announced that he had decided to take an indefinite leave of absence from work in order to focus on his treatment.

On April 10, 2015, it was announced that, in coordination with Bristol Motor Speedway, Fox, and Stand Up to Cancer, the 2015 Food City 500 would be renamed the Food City 500 In Support Of Steve Byrnes and Stand Up To Cancer; the race would feature tributes to his legacy as a NASCAR broadcaster, along with his 56th birthday, which fell during the week prior to the race.

Two days after the tribute race, Byrnes died early on April 21, 2015, of complications from his cancer in Fort Mill, South Carolina, one week after his 56th birthday, and was survived by his wife Karen and son Bryson. In tribute, drivers Josh Wise and Clint Bowyer added photos of Byrnes and his son Bryson to their cars' hoods for the Toyota Owners 400. After Byrnes was invited to become part of the voting panel for the NASCAR Hall of Fame Class of 2016, Bryson delivered his father's completed ballot to the accountants that tally the votes on May 20, 2015, completing Steve's final duties.

On May 22, 2015, Fox Sports dedicated a studio at its Charlotte facilities, used primarily by its studio program NASCAR Race Hub, as the "Steve Byrnes Studio". Fox also created the Byrnsie Award, an honor given to those who exemplified Byrnes' values of "preparation, teamwork and family".

== Personal life ==
Byrnes lived in the Charlotte metropolitan area (where most NASCAR teams are based) with his wife Karen and son Bryson. Bryson graduated from Charlotte Christian School and is following in his father's footsteps by pursuing a career in broadcasting. Bryson presents the Byrnsie Award in the last Cup Series race of the season that Fox is broadcasting. He also reported on the pre-race gridwalk with Michael Waltrip at the 2021 NASCAR All-Star Race.
