= NASCAR on SportsChannel America =

Coverage of auto racing

NASCAR on SportsChannel America relates to NASCAR's Busch Grand National (now the Xfinity Series) races broadcast on the now defunct SportsChannel America television network. SportsChannel America's coverage began in 1990. For instance, SportsChannel America broadcast the Roses Stores 200 and the Chevy Dealers of New England 250.

== Commentators ==
- Rick Benjamin – Benjamin used the pseudonym Ron Williams, because his family unapproved of him revealing his real name.
- Ron Bouchard
- Mike Hogewood
- Glenn Jarrett
- Mike Joy
- Ralph Sheheen
- Bob Varsha

== See also ==
- Xfinity Series#United States
