= Charlotte Christian School =

Private school in Charlotte, North Carolina, United States

Location
- 7301 Sardis Rd; Charlotte, North Carolina, Mecklenburg County 28270; United States; 35°08′27″N 80°46′10″W

Information
- Type: Private; College-preparatory; Christian school
- Motto: Veritas Tota, Homini Toti (The Whole Truth, for the Whole Person)
- Religious affiliation: Christian
- Denomination: Non-denominational
- Established: 1950 (76 years ago)
- CEEB code: 340667
- NCES School ID: 01011634
- Head of school: Barry Giller
- Faculty: 90.9 (on an FTE basis)
- Grades: JK–12
- Gender: Co-educational
- Enrollment: 1,111
- Student to teacher ratio: 12.2
- Campus size: 55 acres (220,000 m^{2}), 21 Buildings
- Campus type: Suburban
- Colors: Royal blue, white, black
- Athletics: North Carolina Independent Schools Athletic Association (NCISAA)
- Nickname: Knights
- Team name: Charlotte Christian Knights
- Accreditation: SACS; AdvancED
- Tuition: $18,850–$24,605
- Website: www.charlottechristian.com

Charlotte Christian School is a private, college preparatory, non-denominational Christian school for grades JK–12 located in Charlotte, North Carolina.

== History ==
In 1950, Dr. L. Poindexter McClenny began a ministry at Calvary Presbyterian Church in uptown Charlotte called Calvary Christian Day School for kindergarten to grade six. In 1960, a group of men inspired by a Billy Graham crusade organized Christian High School. In 1969, these two schools merged to become Christian School Association of Charlotte, Inc., creating a kindergarten through twelfth grade institution. The school continued to grow and moved to its current site on Sardis Road in 1971. In 1976 the school was renamed Charlotte Christian School.

== Academics ==
Charlotte Christian offers more than 45 Advanced Placement and honors courses. In the National Merit Scholarship Competition (NMSC), Charlotte Christian had 11 awards recipients

=== Fine arts ===
The Center for Worship and Performing Arts is at the center of the fine arts program on campus. This two-story building contains an auditorium, a black-box theater, a scene shop and dressing rooms for student performers. There is also space for visual arts students to display their work. The center hosts plays, concerts, chapels, assemblies and other large events.

The performing arts program has received 24 Wells Fargo Blumey Award nominations for upper school musicals since the award began in 2012, and it has won five. Theatre students also have won honors at the Wingate Shakespeare Festival, the North Carolina Theatre Competition and Christians in Theatre Arts competitions.

== Athletics ==
Charlotte Christian competes in the 4-A division of the North Carolina Independent Schools Athletic Association (NCISAA) and the Charlotte Independent Schools Athletic Association (CISAA) conference.

The varsity baseball team has won seventeen NCISAA state championship titles: 1991, 1999, 2000, 2002, 2003, 2004, 2005, 2006, 2007, 2009, 2012, 2013, 2014, 2015, 2019, 2021, 2022.

The Charlotte Christian varsity softball team has won two NCISAA state championship titles: 2021, 2022

Charlotte Christian's Varsity Football team has been noted for the four former professional players on its coaching staff and for its high percentage of graduating seniors that play in college. The team has won nine NCISAA state titles: 1992, 2008, 2012, 2013, 2014, 2017, 2018, 2019, 2020.

Charlotte Christian's Men's Varsity Basketball team has won three NCISAA state titles: 1992, 1997, and 2001. Charlotte Christian's Ladies' Varsity Basketball team has won five NCISAA state titles: 1999, 2001, 2002, 2003, 2004.

Charlotte Christian's Ladies' Cross Country team has won three NCISAA state titles: 1990, 1991, 1993.

Charlotte Christian's Men's Track & Field team won NCISAA state titles in 2001 and 2025, and the Ladies' Track and Field Team won state titles in 2001 and 2002.

== Notable alumni ==
- Philip Abner (2021), MLB pitcher
- Daniel Bard (2003), MLB pitcher
- Luke Bard (2009), MLB pitcher
- Garrett Bradbury (2014), NFL center
- Seth Curry (2008), NBA player
- Stephen Curry (2006), NBA player, 4x NBA champion and 2x NBA MVP
- Matthias Farley (2011), NFL safety
- Todd Fuller (1992), NBA player
- Anthony Gill (2011), professional basketball player
- Bo Hines (2014), college football player and politician
- Clint Irwin, MLS goalkeeper
- Jackson Kowar, MLB pitcher for the Seattle Mariners
- Desmond Lawrence, Canadian Football League (CFL) defensive back
- Akil Mitchell (2010), professional basketball player
- Bailey Ober, baseball pitcher for the Minnesota Twins
- Jared Odenbeck, professional soccer player
- Ollie Sturluson, professional basketball player
- Lauren Swickard, actress, writer, producer
- Jeremy Thompson, NFL defensive end
- Orrin Thompson, NFL and CFL offensive tackle
