= Örlygur Aron Sturluson =

Icelandic basketball player (1981–2000)

Personal information
- Born: 21 May 1981 Keflavík, Iceland
- Died: 16 January 2000 (aged 18) Njarðvík, Iceland

Career information
- High school: Charlotte Christian (Charlotte, North Carolina)
- Playing career: 1997–2000
- Position: Point guard

Career history
- 1997–1998: Njarðvík
- 1999–2000: Njarðvík
- 1999: → ÍRB

Career highlights
- Icelandic League champion (1998); Icelandic Supercup (1999); Icelandic All-Star (2000)

Career Úrvalsdeild karla statistics
- Points: 286 (10.6 ppg)
- Assists: 114 (4.2 apg)
- Steals: 72 (2.7 spg)

Örlygur Aron Sturluson (21 May 1981 – 16 January 2000) was an Icelandic basketball player, who played for Njarðvík in the Icelandic Úrvalsdeild where he won the national championship in 1998. He started playing for the Icelandic national team in 1999 and was considered one of the most promising prospects in Icelandic basketball at the time of his death.

== Career ==
=== Playing career ===
Örlygur started playing basketball at the age of 8 with Ungmennafélag Njarðvíkur. He broke into the starting lineup of Úrvalsdeild powerhouse Njarðvík in 1997 at the age of 16. His first game came against ÍA where he had 10 points and 7 assists. He was a key player in Njarðvík's 1998 Icelandic championship run, averaging 15.0 points and 5.0 assists in the three game sweep of KR in the finals, including a 20 points, 9 assists and 6 steals performance in game two of the series.

Örlygur spent the 1998-1999 season playing for Charlotte Christian Knights under coach Bobby Jones where he set the school single season record for assists and steals.

He rejoined Njarðvík in the summer of 1999 while also playing for ÍRB, a joint team of Njarðvík and Keflavík in the Korać Cup. He helped the joint ÍRB team to advance to the second round of the Korać Cup before bowing out while also helping Njarðvík achieve a 10-3 record in the Úrvalsdeild before the all star break. He was selected for the 2000 Icelandic All-Star game, scoring seven points in what would prove to be his last game.

=== National team career ===
Örlygur played three games with the Icelandic men's national basketball team and five games for the U21 national team in 1999. He had previously played for the junior national teams.

== Death ==
Örlygur died in the early morning of January 16, 2000, after an accidental fall.

== Family ==
Örlygur was the son of Særún Lúðvíksdóttir and former Icelandic national team player Sturla Örlygsson, and the brother of women's national team player Margrét Kara Sturludóttir and Úrvalsdeild karla player Sigurður Dagur Sturluson. He was also nephew of former Úrvalsdeild karla players Teitur Örlygsson, who won the Icelandic championship a record 10 times, Gunnar Örn Örlygsson, a former Althing member, and Stefán Örlygsson.

== Popular culture ==
- Ölli is a 2013 documentary by Garðar Örn Arnarson about Örlygur's life and basketball career. Ölli was the nickname that Örlygur commonly went by.

== See also ==
- List of basketball players who died during their careers
