= Mike Hogewood =

American sports announcer (1954–2018)

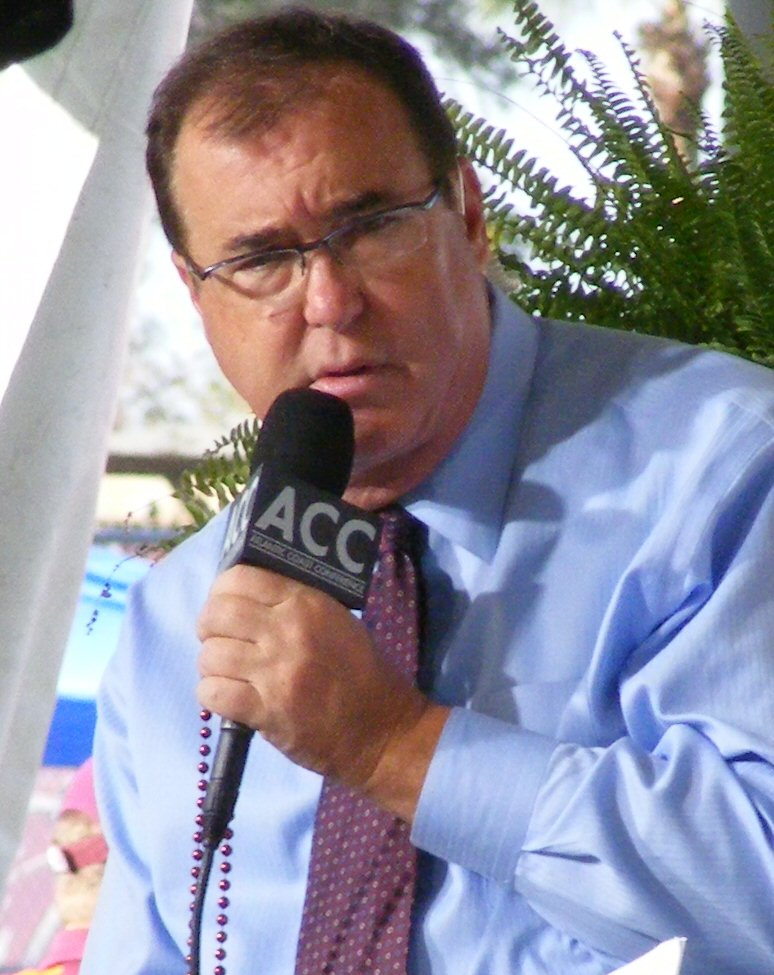
- Hogewood in December 2007
- Born: Michael Ashley Hogewood; September 13, 1954; Greensboro, North Carolina
- Died: September 5, 2018 (aged 63); Greensboro, North Carolina
- Occupation: Sportscaster
- Years active: 1987–2013

Michael Ashley Hogewood (September 13, 1954 – September 5, 2018) was an American sportscaster. He was a play-by-play announcer, studio host, and sideline reporter.

Hogewood was best known for calling play-by-play and sideline reporting on ACC college football and basketball for Raycom Sports (from the mid-1990s until 2015), and for calling play-by-play and being a pit reporter on NASCAR Cup, Busch and Truck series races for TNN Sports, (from 1997 to 2000), co commentator for TNN Motor Madness Monster Jam alongside Scott Douglass from 1998 to 2002 and Turner Sports (from 1997 to 2001).

== Career ==
=== ACC and freelance work ===
Hogewood was primarily associated with Raycom Sports (formerly Jefferson Pilot Sports). Hogewood was best known for his work on ACC football games, ACC men's and women's basketball, as well as for anchoring Raycom's coverage of Nextel Cup NASCAR races. In addition to his work with Raycom, Hogewood did play-by-play for FSN South, Sun Sports, New England Sports Network, Comcast SportsNet, HDNet and the Speed Channel. He became a freelance announcer after nearly 15 years of experience as a network announcer, and later sports director, for the ABC (now Fox) affiliates WBRC-TV (early 1980s) in Birmingham, Alabama, WGHP-TV (1985–1987) in High Point, North Carolina, and later at CBS affiliate WFMY-TV Channel 2 (1987–2001) in his hometown of Greensboro, North Carolina. He briefly worked for NBC affiliate WXII-TV in Winston-Salem, North Carolina, in the early 2000s on a series called Hog's Heroes.

Hogewood was host of several television sports reporting shows, including: ACC Football Today, ACC Basketball Today, Saturdays in the South, and the Emmy Award winning ACC All Access.

=== NASCAR work ===
Hogewood was also well known for his work on NASCAR races for TNN Sports (part of CBS, occasionally letting Hogewood appear on CBS), and for Turner Sports (which produced NASCAR races on NBC starting in 2001, occasionally letting Hogewood appear on NBC).

In 1992, while working at a local TV station in Greensboro(WFMY), Hogewood interviewed Richard Petty during his final season in the Cup series as part of his retirement tour.

Hogewood was primarily a pit reporter for many (although not all) Cup, Busch and Truck races on TNN starting in 1997, however if the Busch Series had a standalone race, Hogewood would sometimes call play-by-play of the Busch race. Hogewood's play by play work came alongside several other voices, including Greg Sacks. When TNN's parent company CBS Sports aired a standalone Busch or Truck race and used the TNN crew to do so (while CBS' crew covered Cup), Hogewood would occasionally appear as a pit reporter on CBS. TNN Sports lost NASCAR rights after the 2000 season, however Hogewood remained with the network in other capacities through 2002.

Hogewood also worked on NASCAR for Turner Sports (TBS/TNT) at the same time as he worked for TNN, starting in 1997, as Turner had a production partnership with CBS at the time. Hogewood was a pit reporter for Turner's Cup, Busch and Truck series races, as part of the primary broadcast team. However, despite Turner forming a partnership to produce NASCAR races on NBC for half of the Busch and Cup schedules starting in 2001, greatly increasing the number of races produced by Turner, Hogewood was replaced by Dave Burns on the primary Cup and Busch broadcast team, demoting Hogewood to some (but not all) standalone Busch events on TNT. However, Hogewood's first and only chance to call play-by-play for Turner did come that season, as he announced the standalone Busch event at Watkins Glen, alongside Cup driver Tony Stewart. This event was part of Turner's NBC deal, and was also Hogewood's only appearance on the peacock network. Stewart had worked alongside play-by-play man Allen Bestwick and the primary Turner NASCAR crew on a Busch race in each of 1999 and 2000, while Hogewood had been in his usual spot on pit road, but in 2001 with the Cup crew taking the weekend off, Stewart worked alongside Hogewood instead. This would prove to be Hogewood's last race with Turner Sports, as he left following 2001. As TNN had lost NASCAR following 2000, this meant it was also Hogewood's final live NASCAR television broadcast.

=== Other work ===
Hogewood also was a broadcaster for TNN Sports' coverage of Monster Jam from 2000 to 2002. He also covered events for the Big South Conference, and did commercials for Carolina Kia in the Triad.

Between 2009 and 2011, Hogewood was the play-by-play commentator for professional wrestling promotion, Ring of Honor, as a part of its television deal with Denver-based network, HDNet.

Hogewood retired from ACC football in 2013 after 26 years as a sports broadcaster.

Hogewood died on September 5, 2018, at the age of 63 of a heart attack in his sleep.
