= NASCAR on TNN =

Coverage of NASCAR races on TNN

- Genre: Auto racing telecasts
- Presented by: Buddy Baker; Dick Berggren; Neil Bonnett; Eli Gold; Glenn Jarrett; Mike Joy; Phil Parsons; Kenny Wallace (for other reporters and former staff, see broadcast team section below)
- Country of origin: United States
- Original language: English
- No. of seasons: 10

Production
- Production locations: Various NASCAR racetracks (race telecasts, and pre-race shows)
- Camera setup: Multi-camera
- Running time: 2.5 to 5 hours (depending on race length)
- Production companies: TNN Motor Sports; World Sports Enterprises (1996-2000); CBS Sports (1995–2000)

Original release
- Network: The Nashville Network (1991–2000); The National Network (2000)
- Release: March 3, 1991 – November 5, 2000

Related
- American Sports Cavalcade; NASCAR on CBS

NASCAR on TNN was the name of a television program that broadcast NASCAR races on The Nashville Network (now Paramount Network) that aired from March 3, 1991 to November 5, 2000.

== History ==
TNN started showing races live in 1991, but it had aired taped coverage of a few Winston Cup races in the 1980s on its American Sports Cavalcade program.

TNN had a self-operating and self-promoting sub-division called TNN Motor Sports, and aired races produced by that division from 1991 to 2000. Under the TNN Motor Sports umbrella, NASCAR series races (including those of the then-Winston Cup Series and Busch Grand National Series, as well as the Craftsman Truck Series) were the most prominently featured, but races of smaller circuits such as the International Motor Sports Association IMSA Sports Car Series, ASA, USAC, the NHRA, and ARCA were also showcased, as was motorcycle and speedboat racing.

In 1995, the motorsports operations were moved into the industrial park located at Charlotte Motor Speedway in Concord, North Carolina, where TNN had purchased controlling interest in World Sports Enterprises, a motorsports production company.

Also by 1995, Westinghouse Electric Corporation, who at the time owned the CBS networks and had an existing relationship with TNN through its Group W division, purchased TNN and its sister network CMT outright to form CBS Cable, along with a short-lived startup network entitled Eye On People (now Investigation Discovery). TNN's ties to CBS allowed it to carry CBS Sports' run overs, which happened during a NASCAR Busch Series race at Texas Motor Speedway in 1999. The network however was a center of controversy for not airing the following year's Busch Series race at the same track after the initial broadcast on CBS rained out, instead showing Tom Sawyer.

=== Races aired ===
TNN picked up several of the "second tier" Winston Cup races of the time, whose rights packages were allowed to expire by ESPN. Races at tracks such as Rockingham, Dover, Pocono, Loudon, and Phoenix, were among the events signed.

In general, ESPN abandoned slower, longer, races. 500-mile races at Rockingham, Dover and Pocono were known to last upwards of five hours, requiring a broadcast window as long as six hours to include pre-race and post-race coverage. While the growing ESPN network did not want to dedicate such large windows to what were regarded as second-tier races, TNN's relatively open schedule for Sunday afternoons allowed for the large broadcast windows that these races required. The races at Rockingham and Dover were shortened to 400 miles in 1995 and 1997, respectively, but remained part of the TNN lineup.

TNN began airing NASCAR’s all-star race, then known as The Winston, when it was moved to prime time in 1992. This meant that, at its peak, TNN was home to eight Cup Series broadcasts per season, a quarter of the schedule; this consisted of both races at Rockingham, Dover, and Loudon, Phoenix's lone race, and the June race at Pocono (TBS aired the July race).

In 1998, TNN acquired the one-time rights (from CBS) of the Pepsi 400, the first race at Daytona run at night. Due to Florida wildfires, the race was postponed from July 4 to October. Because of the postponement, CBS, which originally held the rights to the race, declined to cover the October race because of pre-existing coverage agreements, and not wanting to go head-to-head with Game 1 of the World Series on Fox. TNN stepped in and as a result, covered the first race at Daytona held under the lights.

The Winter Heat Series meanwhile, aired during the winter months between November and January (during NASCAR's offseason). The program began during the 1994-1995 winter and ran through the 1998-1999 winter. The races were held at the 3/8 mile Tucson Raceway Park in Tucson, Arizona. TNN originally broadcast the races before ESPN took over.

TNN also provided coverage for many Busch Series races from 1991-2000. The network covered events at smaller facilities such as Lanier, South Boston, Myrtle Beach, and Hickory. Similarly, the network broadcast Craftsman Truck Series events at Topeka, Flemington, Odessa, and Nashville.

== Broadcast team ==
Mike Joy, a pit reporter for CBS at the time, was the lead commentator for TNN’s initial years from 1991 to 1995; when he moved to become the lead commentator at CBS, he was replaced by Eli Gold in 1996. When Gold was unavailable due to scheduling conflicts with his role as radio play-by-play man for the University of Alabama, particularly for Busch Series races in the autumn, RaceDay host Rick Benjamin often filled in.

One constant presence in the TNN broadcast booth was analyst Buddy Baker. Baker worked for the network for all 10 seasons it covered Winston Cup and Busch Series action. Over the course of its decade covering the sport, TNN also utilized other analysts such as Neil Bonnett and Dick Berggren, as well as pit reporters Glenn Jarrett, who like Baker worked for TNN the entire decade, Steve Evans, Brock Yates, Randy Pemberton, and Ralph Sheheen.

Bonnett was TNN's lead analyst from 1991–93 and hosted the racing highlight show Winners for the network until his tragic death in a practice crash prior to the 1994 Daytona 500.

In addition to its regular analysts, TNN provided the launching pad for future broadcast mainstays Darrell Waltrip, Larry McReynolds, and Phil Parsons. Waltrip, who remained an active Cup Series driver on Sundays until 2000, cut his teeth as a broadcaster by serving as an analyst for Saturday Busch Series telecasts on TNN starting in 1994. Likewise, McReynolds provided commentary for select Busch Series and Craftsman Truck Series races that did not conflict with his crew chief duties for the Winston Cup Series on Sundays. Parsons was the sole analyst for the network's first Winston Cup event in 1991 and would later return for sporadic appearances throughout the remainder of the decade.

TNN also featured a few pit reporters that went on to find success at other networks in the future, such as future ESPN pit reporter and NBC lead commentator Bill Weber, future Fox, NBC, and TNT pit reporter Matt Yocum, ACC sports mainstay Mike Hogewood, and pit reporter Steve Byrnes, who hosted several NASCAR-related programs for Fox and Speed.

For the Busch Series race at Memphis in 2001, there was a mini-TNN reunion as Gold and Jarrett called the race for NBC, with Sheheen in the pits. The race had been postponed a day by rain and thus the normal NBC broadcast team of Allen Bestwick, Benny Parsons, and Wally Dallenbach was unavailable to call the event; they were in Martinsville to call the Old Dominion 500 which was also affected by the rain and postponed.

== TNN loses NASCAR (2000) ==
NASCAR wanted to capitalize on its increased popularity at the start of the 21st century, so the organization decided that future television deals would be centralized; that is, the networks would negotiate with NASCAR directly for a regular schedule of telecasts, as opposed to negotiating with each individual race track. With many tracks now falling under the ownership of either the France-family led International Speedway Corporation or the Bruton Smith led Speedway Motorsports, it was much easier for consolidated television packages to be negotiated. NASCAR wanted to increase the number of races by each partner, and have as many races on broadcast networks as possible, to prevent fans from missing races.

During the final season of the old broadcast arrangement in 2000, NASCAR had races on CBS, TNN, ESPN, ABC, NBC and TBS. ESPN and its sister network ABC broadcast the most races during the 2000 season (18). TNN had the second most (8, plus The Winston All-Star Race), followed by CBS (4, plus the Busch Clash and 125-mile qualifying races for the Daytona 500), TBS (3), and NBC (1).

The first consolidated TV deal was struck on December 15, 1999.

Under the new deal, Fox Sports, FX, NBC and TBS (later moved to TNT) agreed to pay $2.4 billion for a new six-year package, covering the Winston Cup (now NASCAR Cup) Series and Busch (now Xfinity) Series schedules.

- Fox and FX would televise the first 16 races of the 2001, 2003 and 2005 seasons and races 2 through 17 of the 2002, 2004 and 2006 seasons. Fox would air the Daytona 500 in the odd-numbered years. All Busch Series races during that part of the season would also be on Fox/FX.
- NBC and TNT would televise the final 17 races of the even-numbered years as well as the Daytona 500 and the last 18 races of the odd-numbered years, as well as all Busch Series races held in that time of the year.

With its limited reach in terms of viewers, and with changes being made to the network itself in order to attract younger viewers, TNN couldn't provide the platform or scope that NASCAR wanted for its future television partners. As a result, after nearly 10 years of live coverage, as well as tape delayed coverage on American Sports Cavalcade in the 1980s, TNN's partnership with NASCAR came to a close at the conclusion of the 2000 NASCAR Winston Cup Series season. The network's final broadcast was the Checker Auto Parts/Dura Lube 500 on November 5. TNN's final NASCAR broadcast as The Nashville Network was the 2000 MBNA.com 400 on September 24. It became The National Network the next day, and on the last couple of TNN races, the new logo was in the top right corner, instead of the transparent Nashville Network logo.

== Commentators ==
Notable TNN racing personalities included Mike Joy, Steve Evans, Eli Gold, Buddy Baker, Neil Bonnett, Randy Pemberton, Brock Yates, Glenn Jarrett, Mike Hogewood, Steve Byrnes, Ralph Sheheen, Dick Berggren, Larry McReynolds, Darrell Waltrip, Chad Little, Mark Allen, Mark Garrow, and Rick Benjamin.

=== Cup ===
Year	Date	Event	Track	Network	Coverage	Commentary		Pit Reporters
Year	Date	Event	Track	Network	Coverage	Lap-by-lap	Color	Pit Reporters
1991	March 3	Goodwrench 500	Rockingham	TNN	Live	Mike Joy	Phil Parsons	Glenn Jarrett; Steve Evans
1991	June 2	Budweiser 500	Dover	TNN	Live	Mike Joy	Buddy Baker; Phil Parsons	Glenn Jarrett; Steve Evans
1991	September 15	Peak Antifreeze 500	Dover	TNN	Live	Mike Joy	Neil Bonnett; Buddy Baker	Glenn Jarrett; Steve Evans; Brock Yates
1991	October 20	AC Delco 500	Rockingham	TNN	Live	Mike Joy	Neil Bonnett; Buddy Baker	Glenn Jarrett; Steve Evans
1991	November 3	Pyroil 500	Phoenix	TNN	Live	Mike Joy	Neil Bonnett; Buddy Baker	Glenn Jarrett; Brock Yates
1992	March 1	Goodwrench 500	Rockingham	TNN	Live	Mike Joy	Neil Bonnett; Buddy Baker	Glenn Jarrett; Steve Evans
1992	May 16	Winston Open	Charlotte	TNN	Live	Mike Joy	Neil Bonnett (Note: The 1992 Winston Open saw Buddy Baker drive in the race, Baker finished but did not advance to The Winston.)	Glenn Jarrett; Randy Pemberton
1992	May 16	The Winston	Charlotte	TNN	Live	Mike Joy	Neil Bonnett; Buddy Baker	Glenn Jarrett; Randy Pemberton
1992	May 31	Budweiser 500	Dover	TNN	Live	Mike Joy	Neil Bonnett; Buddy Baker	Glenn Jarrett; Steve Evans
1992	September 20	Peak Antifreeze 500	Dover	TNN	Live	Mike Joy	Neil Bonnett; Buddy Baker	Glenn Jarrett; Steve Evans
1992	October 25	AC Delco 500	Rockingham	TNN	Live	Mike Joy	Neil Bonnett; Buddy Baker	Glenn Jarrett; Steve Evans
1992	November 1	Pyroil 500	Phoenix	TNN	Live	Mike Joy	Neil Bonnett; Buddy Baker	Glenn Jarrett; Randy Pemberton
1993	February 28	Goodwrench 500	Rockingham	TNN	Live	Mike Joy	Neil Bonnett; Buddy Baker	Glenn Jarrett; Randy Pemberton
1993	March 20	Motorcraft Quality Parts 500	Atlanta	TNN	Live (Note: The 1993 Motorcraft Quality Parts 500 was scheduled to be on ABC on March 14th but the 1993 Storm of the Century occurred in Atlanta postponing the race. The race was rescheduled for March 20th and ABC pulled out and TNN took over.)	Mike Joy	Neil Bonnett; Buddy Baker	Glenn Jarrett; Randy Pemberton
1993	May 22	Winston Open	Charlotte	TNN	Live	Mike Joy	Neil Bonnett; Buddy Baker	Glenn Jarrett; Randy Pemberton
1993	May 22	The Winston	Charlotte	TNN	Live	Mike Joy	Neil Bonnett; Buddy Baker	Glenn Jarrett; Randy Pemberton
1993	June 6	Miller Genuine Draft 500	Dover	TNN	Live	Mike Joy	Neil Bonnett; Buddy Baker	Glenn Jarrett; Randy Pemberton
1993	July 11	Slick 50 300	New Hampshire	TNN	Live	Mike Joy	Neil Bonnett; Buddy Baker	Glenn Jarrett; Randy Pemberton
1993	September 19	Splitfire Spark Plug 500	Dover	TNN	Live	Mike Joy	Neil Bonnett; Buddy Baker	Glenn Jarrett; Randy Pemberton
1993	October 24	AC Delco 500	Rockingham	TNN	Live	Mike Joy	Neil Bonnett; Buddy Baker	Glenn Jarrett; Ralph Sheheen
1993	October 31	Dura Lube 500	Phoenix	TNN	Live	Mike Joy	Neil Bonnett; Buddy Baker	Glenn Jarrett; Ralph Sheheen
1994	February 27	Goodwrench 500	Rockingham	TNN	Live	Mike Joy	Buddy Baker; Glenn Jarrett	Randy Pemberton; Ralph Sheheen
1994	May 21	The Winston Open	Charlotte	TNN	Live	Mike Joy	Buddy Baker	Glenn Jarrett; Randy Pemberton
1994	May 21	The Winston Select	Charlotte	TNN	Live	Mike Joy	Buddy Baker	Glenn Jarrett; Randy Pemberton
1994	June 5	Miller Genuine Draft 500	Dover	TNN	Live	Mike Joy	Buddy Baker; Kenny Wallace	Glenn Jarrett; Randy Pemberton
1994	June 12	UAW-GM Teamwork 500	Pocono	TNN	Live	Mike Joy	Buddy Baker; Kenny Wallace	Glenn Jarrett; Randy Pemberton
1994	July 10	Slick 50 300	New Hampshire	TNN	Live	Mike Joy	Buddy Baker; Kenny Wallace	Glenn Jarrett; Randy Pemberton
1994	September 18	Splitfire Spark Plug 500	Dover	TNN	Live	Mike Joy	Buddy Baker; Chuck Bown	Glenn Jarrett; Randy Pemberton
1994	October 23	AC Delco 500	Rockingham	TNN	Live	Mike Joy	Buddy Baker; David Pearson	Glenn Jarrett; Randy Pemberton
1994	October 30	Dura Lube 500	Phoenix	TNN	Live	Mike Joy	Buddy Baker; David Pearson	Glenn Jarrett; Randy Pemberton
1995	February 26	Goodwrench 500	Rockingham	TNN	Live	Mike Joy	Buddy Baker; Ernie Irvan	Glenn Jarrett; Randy Pemberton
1995	May 20	Winston Open	Charlotte	TNN	Live	Mike Joy	Buddy Baker; Ernie Irvan	Glenn Jarrett; Randy Pemberton
1995	May 20	The Winston Select	Charlotte	TNN	Live	Mike Joy	Buddy Baker; Ernie Irvan	Glenn Jarrett; Randy Pemberton
1995	June 4	Miller Genuine Draft 500	Dover	TNN	Live	Mike Joy	Buddy Baker; Ernie Irvan	Glenn Jarrett; Randy Pemberton
1995	June 11	UAW-GM Teamwork 500	Pocono	TNN	Live	Mike Joy	Buddy Baker; Ernie Irvan	Glenn Jarrett; Randy Pemberton
1995	July 9	Slick 50 300	New Hampshire	TNN	Live	Mike Joy	Buddy Baker; Ernie Irvan	Glenn Jarrett; Randy Pemberton
1995	September 17	MBNA 400	Dover	TNN	Live	Mike Joy	Buddy Baker; Kenny Wallace	Glenn Jarrett; Randy Pemberton
1995	October 22	AC Delco 400	Rockingham	TNN	Live	Mike Joy	Buddy Baker; Dick Berggren	Glenn Jarrett; Randy Pemberton
1995	October 29	Dura Lube 500	Phoenix	TNN	Live	Mike Joy	Buddy Baker; Dick Berggren	Glenn Jarrett; Randy Pemberton
1996	February 25	Goodwrench Service 400	Rockingham	TNN	Live	Eli Gold	Buddy Baker; Dick Berggren	Glenn Jarrett; Randy Pemberton
1996	May 18	Winston Open	Charlotte	TNN	Live	Eli Gold	Buddy Baker; Dick Berggren	Glenn Jarrett; Randy Pemberton
1996	May 18	The Winston Select	Charlotte	TNN	Live	Eli Gold	Buddy Baker; Dick Berggren	Glenn Jarrett; Randy Pemberton
1996	June 2	Miller 500	Dover	TNN	Live	Eli Gold	Buddy Baker; Chad Little	Glenn Jarrett; Randy Pemberton
1996	June 16	UAW-GM Teamwork 500	Pocono	TNN	Live	Eli Gold	Buddy Baker; Phil Parsons	Glenn Jarrett; Randy Pemberton
1996	July 14	Jiffy Lube 300	New Hampshire	TNN	Live	Eli Gold	Buddy Baker; Chad Little	Glenn Jarrett; Randy Pemberton
1996	September 15	MBNA 400	Dover	TNN	Live	Eli Gold	Buddy Baker; Dick Berggren	Glenn Jarrett; Randy Pemberton
1996	October 20	AC Delco 400	Rockingham	TNN	Live	Eli Gold	Buddy Baker; Dick Berggren	Glenn Jarrett; Randy Pemberton
1996	October 27	Dura Lube 500	Phoenix	TNN	Live	Eli Gold	Buddy Baker; Dick Berggren	Glenn Jarrett; Randy Pemberton
1997	February 23	Goodwrench Service 400	Rockingham	TNN	Live	Eli Gold	Buddy Baker; Dick Berggren	Glenn Jarrett; Matt Yocum; Steve Byrnes
1997	May 17	Winston Open	Charlotte	TNN	Live	Eli Gold	Buddy Baker; Dick Berggren	Glenn Jarrett; Matt Yocum; Steve Byrnes
1997	May 17	The Winston	Charlotte	TNN	Live	Eli Gold	Buddy Baker; Dick Berggren	Glenn Jarrett; Matt Yocum; Steve Byrnes
1997	June 1	Miller 500	Dover	TNN	Live	Eli Gold	Buddy Baker; Dick Berggren	Glenn Jarrett; Matt Yocum; Steve Byrnes
1997	June 8	Pocono 500	Pocono	TNN	Live	Eli Gold	Buddy Baker; Dick Berggren	Glenn Jarrett; Matt Yocum; Steve Byrnes
1997	July 13	Jiffy Lube 300	New Hampshire	TNN	Live	Eli Gold	Buddy Baker; Dick Berggren	Glenn Jarrett; Matt Yocum; Steve Byrnes
1997	September 14	Farm Aid on CMT 300	New Hampshire	TNN	Live	Eli Gold	Buddy Baker; Dick Berggren	Glenn Jarrett; Matt Yocum; Steve Byrnes
1997	September 21	MBNA 400	Dover	TNN	Live	Eli Gold	Buddy Baker; Dick Berggren	Glenn Jarrett; Matt Yocum; Steve Byrnes
1997	~~October 26~~; October 27	AC Delco 400	Rockingham	TNN	Live (Note: The 1997 AC Delco 400 was scheduled to be on October 26th but rescheduled on October 27th due to a rain delay.)	Eli Gold	Buddy Baker; Dick Berggren	Glenn Jarrett; Matt Yocum; Steve Byrnes
1997	November 2	Dura Lube 500 presented by Kmart	Phoenix	TNN	Live	Eli Gold	Buddy Baker; Dick Berggren	Glenn Jarrett; Matt Yocum; Steve Byrnes
1998	February 22	GM Goodwrench Service Plus 400	Rockingham	TNN	Live	Eli Gold	Buddy Baker; Dick Berggren	Glenn Jarrett; Matt Yocum; Steve Byrnes
1998	May 16	The Winston Open	Charlotte	TNN	Live	Eli Gold	Buddy Baker; Dick Berggren	Glenn Jarrett; Matt Yocum; Steve Byrnes
1998	May 16	The Winston	Charlotte	TNN	Live	Eli Gold	Buddy Baker; Dick Berggren	Glenn Jarrett; Matt Yocum; Steve Byrnes
1998	May 31	MBNA Platinum 400	Dover	TNN	Live	Eli Gold	Buddy Baker; Dick Berggren	Glenn Jarrett; Matt Yocum; Steve Byrnes
1998	June 21	Pocono 500	Pocono	TNN	Live	Eli Gold	Buddy Baker; Dick Berggren	Glenn Jarrett; Matt Yocum; Steve Byrnes
1998	July 12	Jiffy Lube 300	New Hampshire	TNN	Live	Eli Gold	Buddy Baker; Dick Berggren	Glenn Jarrett; Matt Yocum; Steve Byrnes
1998	August 30	Farm Aid on CMT 300	New Hampshire	TNN	Live	Eli Gold	Buddy Baker; Dick Berggren	Glenn Jarrett; Matt Yocum; Steve Byrnes
1998	September 20	MBNA Gold 400	Dover	TNN	Live	Eli Gold	Buddy Baker; Dick Berggren	Glenn Jarrett; Matt Yocum; Steve Byrnes
1998	October 17	Pepsi 400	Daytona	TNN	Live (Note: The 1998 Pepsi 400 was scheduled to be held on July 4th but the 1998 Florida wildfires occurred. At 10am on July 2, NASCAR announced that the race was being postponed and the decision was made to reschedule the race for October 17, to allow additional time for the wildfires to be controlled. The rescheduling meant that the race would not be televised on CBS, as the network did not want to compete against Fox's broadcast of Game 1 of the Major League Baseball World Series which was held the same day. TNN took over broadcasting the race with their own crew.)	Eli Gold	Buddy Baker; Dick Berggren	Glenn Jarrett; Steve Byrnes; Mike Hogewood
1998	October 25	Dura Lube/Kmart 500	Phoenix	TNN	Live	Eli Gold	Buddy Baker; Dick Berggren	Glenn Jarrett; Matt Yocum; Steve Byrnes
1998	November 1	AC Delco 400	Rockingham	TNN	Live	Eli Gold	Buddy Baker; Dick Berggren	Glenn Jarrett; Matt Yocum; Steve Byrnes
1999	February 21	Dura Lube/Kmart 400	Rockingham	TNN	Live	Mike Joy	Buddy Baker; Dick Berggren	Glenn Jarrett; Ralph Sheheen; Steve Byrnes
1999	May 22	The Winston Open	Charlotte	TNN	Live	Eli Gold	Buddy Baker; Dick Berggren	Glenn Jarrett; Ralph Sheheen; Steve Byrnes
1999	May 22	The Winston	Charlotte	TNN	Live	Eli Gold	Buddy Baker; Dick Berggren	Glenn Jarrett; Ralph Sheheen; Steve Byrnes
1999	June 6	MBNA Platinum 400	Dover	TNN	Live	Eli Gold	Buddy Baker; Dick Berggren	Glenn Jarrett; Ralph Sheheen; Steve Byrnes
1999	June 20	Pocono 500	Pocono	TNN	Live	Eli Gold	Buddy Baker; Dick Berggren	Glenn Jarrett; Ralph Sheheen; Steve Byrnes
1999	July 11	Jiffy Lube 300	New Hampshire	TNN	Live	Eli Gold	Buddy Baker; Dick Berggren	Glenn Jarrett; Ralph Sheheen; Steve Byrnes
1999	September 19	Dura Lube/Kmart 300	New Hampshire	TNN	Live	Eli Gold	Buddy Baker; Dick Berggren	Glenn Jarrett; Ralph Sheheen; Steve Byrnes
1999	September 26	MBNA Gold 400	Dover	TNN	Live	Eli Gold	Buddy Baker; Dick Berggren	Glenn Jarrett; Ralph Sheheen; Steve Byrnes
1999	October 24	Pop Secret Microwave Popcorn 400	Rockingham	TNN	Live	Eli Gold	Buddy Baker; Dick Berggren	Glenn Jarrett; Ralph Sheheen; Steve Byrnes
1999	November 7	Checker Auto Parts/DuraLube 500	Phoenix	TNN	Live	Eli Gold	Buddy Baker; Dick Berggren	Glenn Jarrett; Ralph Sheheen; Steve Byrnes
2000	February 27	Dura Lube/Kmart 400	Rockingham	TNN	Live	Eli Gold	Buddy Baker; Dick Berggren	Glenn Jarrett; Ralph Sheheen; Steve Byrnes
2000	May 19	No Bull 25 Shootout	Charlotte	TNN	Live	Eli Gold	Buddy Baker; Dick Berggren	Glenn Jarrett; Ralph Sheheen; Randy Pemberton
2000	May 20	The Winston Open	Charlotte	TNN	Live	Eli Gold	Buddy Baker; Dick Berggren	Glenn Jarrett; Ralph Sheheen; Randy Pemberton
2000	May 20	No Bull Sprint	Charlotte	TNN	Live	Eli Gold	Buddy Baker; Dick Berggren	Glenn Jarrett; Ralph Sheheen; Randy Pemberton
2000	May 20	The Winston	Charlotte	TNN	Live	Eli Gold	Buddy Baker; Dick Berggren	Glenn Jarrett; Ralph Sheheen; Randy Pemberton
2000	June 4	MBNA Platinum 400	Dover	TNN	Live	Eli Gold	Buddy Baker; Dick Berggren	Glenn Jarrett; Ralph Sheheen; Steve Byrnes
2000	June 11	Kmart 400	Michigan	CBS; TNN	Live (Note: The 2000 Kmart 400 saw coverage start on CBS but move to TNN after two rain delays and CBS needed to air the SBC Senior Open. TNN used CBS's graphics and commentary for the rest of the race.)	Mike Joy	Ned Jarrett; Buddy Baker	Dick Berggren; Ralph Sheheen; Bill Stephens
2000	~~June 18~~; June 19	Pocono 500	Pocono	TNN	Live (Note: The 2000 Pocono 500 was scheduled to be on June 18th but rescheduled on June 19th due to a rain delay.)	Eli Gold	Buddy Baker	Glenn Jarrett; Dick Berggren
2000	July 9	thatlook.com 300	New Hampshire	TNN	Live	Eli Gold	Buddy Baker; Dick Berggren	Glenn Jarrett; Ralph Sheheen; Steve Byrnes
2000	September 17	Dura Lube 300 by Kmart	New Hampshire	TNN	Live	Eli Gold	Buddy Baker; Dick Berggren	Glenn Jarrett; Ralph Sheheen; Mike Hogewood
2000	September 24	MBNA.com 400	Dover	TNN	Live	Eli Gold	Buddy Baker; Dick Berggren	Glenn Jarrett; Ralph Sheheen; Mike Hogewood
2000	October 22	Pop Secret 400	Rockingham	TNN	Live	Eli Gold	Buddy Baker; Dick Berggren	Glenn Jarrett; Ralph Sheheen; Steve Byrnes
2000	November 5	Checker Auto Parts/DuraLube 500	Phoenix	TNN	Live	Eli Gold	Buddy Baker; Dick Berggren	Glenn Jarrett; Ralph Sheheen; Steve Byrnes

=== Xfinity ===
Year	Date	Event	Track	Network	Coverage	Commentary		Pit Reporters
Year	Date	Event	Track	Network	Coverage	Lap-by-lap	Color	Pit Reporters
1995	February 25	Goodwrench Service 200	Rockingham	TNN	Live	Mike Joy	Buddy Baker; Darrell Waltrip	Glenn Jarrett; Randy Pemberton; Larry McReynolds
1995	March 4	Hardee's 250	Richmond	TNN	Live	Mike Joy	Buddy Baker; Darrell Waltrip	Glenn Jarrett; Randy Pemberton; Larry McReynolds
1995	March 17	Opryland USA 320	Nashville	TNN	Live	Mike Joy	Buddy Baker	Glenn Jarrett; Larry McReynolds; Ralph Sheheen
1995	April 15	Sundrop 300	Hickory	TNN	Live	Mike Joy	Buddy Baker	Randy Pemberton
1995	May 13	Stanley 200	New Hampshire	TNN	Live	Mike Joy	Buddy Baker	Randy Pemberton
1995	May 21	CoreStates / Meridian Advantage 200	Nazareth	TNN	Live	Ken Squier	P.J. Jones	Ralph Shaheen
1995	June 3	GM Goodwrench / Delco 200	Dover	TNN	Live	Mike Joy	Buddy Baker; Darrell Waltrip	Glenn Jarrett; Randy Pemberton; Larry McReynolds
1995	June 10	Carolina Pride / Red Dog 250	Myrtle Beach	TNN	Live	Ken Squier	David Pearson	Steve Byrnes
1995	July 2	Sears Auto Center 250	Milwaukee	TNN	Live	Mike Joy	Buddy Baker	Glenn Jarrett
1995	July 22	Humminbird Fishfinder 500K	Talladega	TNN	Live	Mike Joy	Buddy Baker; Darrell Waltrip	Glenn Jarrett; Larry McReynolds
1995	July 29	Winston Motorsports 300	South Boston	TNN	Live	Mike Joy	Buddy Baker; Jeff Burton	Randy Pemberton
1995	September 8	Autolite Platinum 250	Richmond	TNN	Live	Mike Joy	Buddy Baker; Larry McReynolds	Glenn Jarrett; Randy Pemberton
1995	September 16	MBNA 200	Dover	TNN	Live	Mike Joy	Buddy Baker; Darrell Waltrip	Glenn Jarrett; Randy Pemberton; Larry McReynolds
1995	October 21	AC-Delco 200	Rockingham	TNN	Live	Mike Joy	Buddy Baker; Darrell Waltrip	Glenn Jarrett; Randy Pemberton; Larry McReynolds
1996	February 24	Goodwrench Service 200	Rockingham	TNN	Live	Eli Gold	Buddy Baker; Darrell Waltrip	Glenn Jarrett; Randy Pemberton
1996	March 17	BellSouth Mobility / Opryland USA 320	Nashville	TNN	Live	Mike Joy	Buddy Baker	Randy Pemberton
1996	April 6	Sundrop 300	Hickory	TNN	Live	Eli Gold	Buddy Baker	Glenn Jarrett; Larry McReynolds
1996	May 19	CoreStates / Meridian Advantage 200	Nazareth	TNN	Live	Mike Joy	Barry Dodson	Steve Byrnes
1996	June 1	GM Goodwrench / Delco 200	Dover	TNN	Live	Eli Gold	Buddy Baker; Darrell Waltrip	Glenn Jarrett; Randy Pemberton
1996	June 8	Winston Motorsports 300	South Boston	TNN	Live	Mike Joy	Buddy Baker	Randy Pemberton
1996	June 22	Advance Auto Parts 250	Myrtle Beach	TNN	Live	Rick Benjamin	Chuck Bown	Randy Pemberton
1996	July 7	Sears Auto Center 250	Milwaukee	TNN	Live	Eli Gold	Buddy Baker; Bill Venturini	Glenn Jarrett
1996	~~May 12~~; July 12	Stanley 200	New Hampshire	TNN	Live (Note: The 1996 Stanley 200 was scheduled to be on May 12th but rescheduled on July 12th due to a rain delay.)	Eli Gold	Buddy Baker; Darrell Waltrip	Glenn Jarrett; Randy Pemberton
1996	September 14	MBNA 200	Dover	TNN	Live	Rick Benjamin	Buddy Baker; Darrell Waltrip	Glenn Jarrett; Steve Byrnes; Larry McReynolds
1996	October 19	AC-Delco 200	Rockingham	TNN	Live	Rick Benjamin	Buddy Baker; Darrell Waltrip	Glenn Jarrett; Randy Pemberton
1997	February 22	Goodwrench Service 200	Rockingham	TNN	Live	Mike Joy	Buddy Baker; Darrell Waltrip	Glenn Jarrett; Steve Byrnes; Chad Little
1997	March 16	Las Vegas 300	Las Vegas	TNN	Live	Eli Gold	Dick Berggren; Larry McReynolds	Glenn Jarrett; Matt Yocum
1997	March 29	Galaxy Foods 300	Hickory	TNN	Live	Eli Gold	Buddy Baker; Larry McReynolds	Matt Yocum
1997	April 19	BellSouth Mobility / Opryland 320	Nashville	TNN	Live	Mike Joy	Buddy Baker	Mike Hogewood; Matt Yocum
1997	May 10	United States Cellular 200	New Hampshire	TNN	Live	Eli Gold	Buddy Baker	Glenn Jarrett; Matt Yocum
1997	May 31	GM Goodwrench / Delco Battery 200	Dover	TNN	Live	Eli Gold	Darrell Waltrip; Dick Berggren	Glenn Jarrett; Matt Yocum; Chad Little
1997	June 13	Winston Motorsports 300	South Boston	TNN	Live	Eli Gold	Patty Moise; Barry Dodson	Glenn Jarrett
1997	June 29	Lysol 200	Watkins Glen	TNN	Live	Eli Gold	Larry McReynolds	Glenn Jarrett; Matt Yocum
1997	July 12	Advance Auto Parts 250	Myrtle Beach	TNN	Live	Rick Benjamin	Patty Moise; Bill Venturini	Mike Hogewood
1997	September 20	MBNA Gold 200	Dover	TNN	Live	Rick Benjamin	Buddy Baker; Darrell Waltrip	Glenn Jarrett; Steve Byrnes; Chad Little
1997	October 25	AC-Delco 200	Rockingham	TNN	Live	Rick Benjamin	Buddy Baker; Chad Little	Glenn Jarrett; Matt Yocum
1998	February 21	GM Goodwrench Service Plus 200	Rockingham	TNN	Live	Rick Benjamin	Buddy Baker; Darrell Waltrip	Glenn Jarrett; Steve Byrnes
1998	March 15	BellSouth Mobility / Opryland 320	Nashville	TNN	Live	Eli Gold	Buddy Baker; Larry McReynolds	Steve Byrnes; Randy Pemberton
1998	April 11	Galaxy Food Centers 300	Hickory	TNN	Live	Eli Gold	Buddy Baker; Larry McReynolds	Glenn Jarrett; Steve Byrnes
1998	May 9	Gumout Long Life Formula 200	New Hampshire	TNN	Live	Eli Gold	Buddy Baker; Dick Berggren	Glenn Jarrett; Matt Yocum
1998	May 30	MBNA Platinum 200	Dover	TNN	Live	Eli Gold	Buddy Baker; Darrell Waltrip	Glenn Jarrett; Matt Yocum
1998	July 5	DieHard 250	Milwaukee	TNN	Live	Eli Gold	Buddy Baker; Larry McReynolds	Steve Byrnes; Randy Pemberton
1998	July 11	Myrtle Beach 250	Myrtle Beach	TNN	Live	Rick Benjamin	Larry Pearson	Randy Pemberton; Mike Hogewood
1998	July 25	Textilease/Medique 300	South Boston	TNN	Live	Mike Hogewood	Larry Pearson	Glenn Jarrett; Matt Yocum
1998	September 19	MBNA Gold 200	Dover	TNN	Live	Eli Gold	Buddy Baker; Darrell Waltrip	Glenn Jarrett; Matt Yocum
1998	October 31	AC-Delco 200	Rockingham	TNN	Live	Rick Benjamin	Buddy Baker; Darrell Waltrip	Glenn Jarrett; Matt Yocum; Larry McReynolds
1999	February 20	Alltel 200	Rockingham	TNN	Live	Eli Gold	Buddy Baker; Darrell Waltrip	Glenn Jarrett; Ralph Sheheen; Larry McReynolds
1999	March 27	Coca-Cola 300	Texas	CBS; TNN	Live (Note: The 1999 Coca-Cola 300 saw coverage move from CBS to TNN due to a rain delay. TNN used CBS's graphics and commentary for the rest of the race.)	Mike Joy	Ned Jarrett; Buddy Baker	Dick Berggren; Ralph Sheheen; Bill Stephens
1999	May 8	Busch 200	New Hampshire	TNN	Live	Eli Gold	Buddy Baker; Dick Berggren	Glenn Jarrett; Larry McReynolds
1999	June 5	MBNA Platinum 200	Dover	TNN	Live	Eli Gold	Buddy Baker; Darrell Waltrip	Glenn Jarrett; Ralph Sheheen
1999	June 12	Textilease/Medique 300	South Boston	TNN	Live	Eli Gold	Glenn Jarrett	Steve Byrnes; Mike Hogewood
1999	July 4	DieHard 250	Milwaukee	TNN	Live	Eli Gold	Buddy Baker; Larry McReynolds	Glenn Jarrett; Steve Byrnes
1999	July 17	Myrtle Beach 250	Myrtle Beach	TNN	Live	Eli Gold	Larry McReynolds	Glenn Jarrett; Mike Hogewood
1999	July 31	Carquest Auto Parts 250	Gateway	TNN	Live	Eli Gold	Buddy Baker	Glenn Jarrett; Larry McReynolds
1999	September 23	MBNA Gold 200	Dover	TNN	Live	Mike Joy	Buddy Baker; Darrell Waltrip	Glenn Jarrett; Ralph Sheheen; Larry McReynolds
1999	October 23	Kmart 200	Rockingham	TNN	Live	Mike Joy	Buddy Baker; Darrell Waltrip	Glenn Jarrett; Ralph Sheheen; Larry McReynolds
1999	October 30	Sam's Town 250	Memphis	TNN	Live	Eli Gold	Buddy Baker	Glenn Jarrett; Larry McReynolds
1999	November 6	Outback Steakhouse 200	Phoenix	TNN	Live	Mike Joy	Buddy Baker; Darrell Waltrip	Glenn Jarrett; Steve Byrnes; Larry McReynolds
2000	February 27	Alltel 200	Rockingham	TNN	Live	Mike Joy	Buddy Baker; Larry McReynolds	Glenn Jarrett; Ralph Sheheen
2000	April 8	BellSouth Mobility 320	Nashville	TNN	Live	Eli Gold	Buddy Baker	Glenn Jarrett; Randy Pemberton
2000	May 13	Busch 200	New Hampshire	TNN	Live	Eli Gold	Buddy Baker; Dick Berggren	Glenn Jarrett; Larry McReynolds
2000	June 3	MBNA Platinum 200	Dover	TNN	Live	Eli Gold	Buddy Baker; Larry McReynolds	Glenn Jarrett; Ralph Sheheen
2000	June 10	Textilease/Medique 300	South Boston	TNN	Live	Eli Gold	Glenn Jarrett	Mark Garrow; Mike Hogewood
2000	June 17	Myrtle Beach 250	Myrtle Beach	TNN	Live	Mike Hogewood	Greg Sacks	Mark Garrow; Bob Dillner
2000	July 29	Carquest Auto Parts 250	Gateway	TNN	Live	Eli Gold	Buddy Baker	Glenn Jarrett; Mike Massaro
2000	September 23	MBNA.com 200	Dover	TNN	Live	Ralph Sheheen	Buddy Baker; Larry McReynolds	Glenn Jarrett; Mike Hogewood
2000	October 21	Sam's Club 200	Rockingham	TNN	Live	Ralph Sheheen	Buddy Baker; Larry McReynolds	Glenn Jarrett; Steve Byrnes
2000	October 29	Sam's Town 250	Memphis	TNN	Live	Eli Gold	Buddy Baker	Glenn Jarrett; Larry McReynolds
2000	November 4	Outback Steakhouse 200	Phoenix	TNN	Live	Ralph Sheheen	Buddy Baker; Larry McReynolds	Glenn Jarrett; Steve Byrnes

=== Trucks ===
Year	Date	Event	Track	Network	Coverage	Commentary		Pit Reporters
Year	Date	Event	Track	Network	Coverage	Lap-by-lap	Color	Pit Reporters
1994	November 20	Supertruck Winter Heat 200 No. 1	Tucson	TNN	Live	Mike Joy	Buddy Baker	Glenn Jarrett
1994	December 11	Supertruck Winter Heat 200 No. 2	Tucson	TNN	Live	Mike Joy	Buddy Baker	Glenn Jarrett
1995	January 8	Supertruck Winter Heat 200 No. 3	Tucson	TNN	Live	Mike Joy	Buddy Baker	Glenn Jarrett
1995	February 5	Skoal Bandit Copper World Classic	Phoenix	TNN	Live	Mike Joy	Buddy Baker; Ernie Irvan	Glenn Jarrett
1995	April 15	Scott Irvin Chevrolet/Craftsman 200	Saugus	TNN	Live	Glenn Jarrett	Larry McReynolds	Ralph Sheheen
1995	May 5	Maxx Race Cards 200	Portland	TNN	Live	Mike Joy	Glenn Jarrett	Ralph Sheheen
1995	May 13	Jerr Dan/Nelson 150	Evergreen	TNN	Live	Glenn Jarrett	Barry Dodson	Ralph Sheheen
1995	May 27	Western Auto 200	I-70	TNN	Live	Mike Joy	Glenn Jarrett	Ralph Sheheen
1995	July 29	Heartland Tailgate 175	Topeka	TNN	Live	Rick Benjamin	Ernie Irvan; Larry McReynolds	Glenn Jarrett; Ralph Sheheen
1995	August 19	Stevens Beil/Genuine Car Parts 150	Flemington	TNN	Live	Mike Joy	Glenn Jarrett	Randy Pemberton
1995	October 7	Subway 100	Sears Point	TNN	Live	Mike Joy	Glenn Jarrett	Ralph Sheheen
1995	October 15	Spears Manufacturing 200	Mesa Marin	TNN	Live	Glenn Jarrett	Larry McReynolds	Steve Byrnes
1995	October 28	GM Goodwrench/Delco Battery 200	Phoenix	TNN	Live	Mike Joy	Buddy Baker; Darrell Waltrip	Glenn Jarrett; Randy Pemberton; Larry McReynolds
1996	March 17	Florida Dodge Dealers 400	Homestead	TNN	Live	Eli Gold	Dick Berggren; Larry McReynolds	Glenn Jarrett
1996	April 21	Chevrolet Desert Star 300	Phoenix	TNN	Live	Eli Gold	Dick Berggren	Glenn Jarrett
1996	June 9	Lund Look 275	Topeka	TNN	Live	Eli Gold	Larry McReynolds	Glenn Jarrett
1996	June 30	DeVilbiss Superfinish 200	Nazareth	CBS; TNN	Delayed	Mike Joy	Buddy Baker	Glenn Jarrett
1996	July 27	Western Auto 200	I-70	TNN	Live	Eli Gold	Buddy Baker	Randy Pemberton; Shawna Robinson
1996	August 10	Stevens Beil/Genuine Parts 200	Flemington	TNN	Live	Eli Gold	Buddy Baker	Randy Pemberton
1996	August 31	Federated Auto Parts 250	Nashville Fairgrounds	TNN	Live	Mike Joy	Buddy Baker	Randy Pemberton
1996	September 8	Pennzoil/VIP Tripleheader	New Hampshire	TNN	Live	Eli Gold	Larry McReynolds	Glenn Jarrett; Matt Yocum
1996	October 13	Ford Dealers/Ford Credit 300	Mesa Marin	TNN	Live	Eli Gold	Larry McReynolds	Glenn Jarrett

== Notes ==
Preceded by None	NASCAR pay television carrier in the United States; 1991–2000	Succeeded by FX
