= 1999 The Winston =

15th iteration of the NASCAR All-Star Race

Race details
- Date: May 22, 1999
- Location: Concord, North Carolina, Lowe's Motor Speedway
- Course: Permanent racing facility 1.5 mi (2.4 km)
- Distance: Open: 50 laps, 75 mi (121 km); The Winston: 70 Laps, 105 mi (169 km); Segment 1: 30 laps Segment 2: 30 laps Segment 3: 10 laps
- Avg Speed: Open: 135.064 mph (217.364 km/h); The Winston: 183.495 mph (295.307 km/h)

Winston Open
- Pole: Mike Skinner (Richard Childress Racing)
- Time: Set by No Bull 5 Race #1
- Winner: Tony Stewart (Joe Gibbs Racing)

The Winston
- Pole: Bobby Labonte (Joe Gibbs Racing)
- Pole: 1:50.332
- Most laps led: Jeff Gordon (Hendrick Motorsports)
- Laps led: 34
- Winner: Terry Labonte (Hendrick Motorsports)

Television
- Network: TNN
- Announcers: Eli Gold, Buddy Baker, Dick Berggren
- Network: Motor Racing Network

The 1999 edition of The Winston was the second exhibition stock car race of the 1999 NASCAR Winston Cup Series and the 15th iteration of the event. The race was held on Saturday, May 22, 1999, before an audience of 120,000 in Concord, North Carolina at Lowe's Motor Speedway, a 1.5 miles (2.4 km) permanent quad-oval. The race took the scheduled 90 laps to complete. At race's end, Hendrick Motorsports driver Terry Labonte would make a late-race gamble on a pitstop, taking four tires. With five laps to go, he would charge to the front and defend the field, securing his second All-Star Race victory. To fill out the top three, Joe Gibbs Racing driver Tony Stewart and Hendrick Motorsports driver Jeff Gordon would finish second and third, respectively.

In the preliminary Winston Open race, Tony Stewart was able to dominate the majority of the race to earn a spot in The Winston.

== Background ==
The layout of Lowe's Motor Speedway, the venue where the race was held.

Lowe's Motor Speedway is a motorsports complex located in Concord, North Carolina, United States 13 miles from Charlotte, North Carolina. The complex features a 1.5 miles (2.4 km) quad oval track that hosts NASCAR racing including the prestigious Coca-Cola 600 on Memorial Day weekend and The Winston, as well as the UAW-GM Quality 500. The speedway was built in 1959 by Bruton Smith and is considered the home track for NASCAR with many race teams located in the Charlotte area. The track is owned and operated by Speedway Motorsports Inc. (SMI) with Marcus G. Smith (son of Bruton Smith) as track president.

=== Format and eligibility ===
Any driver who had won from the last season or the current season up to the race was eligible to race in The Winston. In addition, one additional driver, the winner of the Winston Open, would be added to the field.

The race remained at its 70 lap format, but for 1998, only green flag laps would count in any segment, not just the third segment.

The second ten-minute break was eliminated and replaced with caution laps, and cars would have the option of pitting for tires and fuel, at the expense of losing track position.

The inversion is changed to a random draw between 3 and 12 cars for the inversion after the first segment.

In 1998, qualifying for The Winston Open was changed. Previously it was accomplished with one-lap qualifying runs. From 1998 to 2000, the No Bull 25 Shootout twin races determined the lineups. Practice speeds (odd/even) from earlier in the day set the field for two 25-lap sprint races. The finish order for the first 25 set the odd positions for the Winston Open, and the finish order for the second 25 set the even positions for the Winston Open.

At the end of 30 laps, with only green-flag laps counting, a giant pegboard will help determine what happens next. A marker will be dropped onto the board and will settle into one of 10 slots numbered from three through 12. That will be the number of positions inverted for the start of the second segment.

- Segment 1: 30 Green Flag laps (no caution laps count)
- Segment 2: 30 Green Flag laps (no caution laps count) / Pit stops optional (cars lose track position if they pit)
- Segment 3: 10 Green Flag laps (no caution laps count)

=== Entry list ===
- (R) denotes rookie driver.

==== Winston Open ====
#	Driver	Team	Make
00	Buckshot Jones (R)	Buckshot Racing	Pontiac
1	Steve Park (R)	Dale Earnhardt, Inc.	Chevrolet
05	Morgan Shepherd	Shepherd Racing Ventures	Pontiac
9	Jerry Nadeau (R)	Melling Racing	Ford
11	Brett Bodine	Brett Bodine Racing	Ford
14	Boris Said	Irvan-Simo Racing	Ford
16	Kevin Lepage	Roush Racing	Ford
20	Tony Stewart (R)	Joe Gibbs Racing	Pontiac
21	Elliott Sadler (R)	Wood Brothers Racing	Ford
23	Jimmy Spencer	Haas-Carter Motorsports	Ford
25	Wally Dallenbach Jr.	Hendrick Motorsports	Chevrolet
26	Johnny Benson Jr.	Roush Racing	Ford
28	Kenny Irwin Jr.	Robert Yates Racing	Ford
30	Todd Bodine	Bahari Racing	Pontiac
31	Mike Skinner	Richard Childress Racing	Chevrolet
33	Ken Schrader	Andy Petree Racing	Chevrolet
41	David Green	Larry Hedrick Motorsports	Chevrolet
42	Joe Nemechek	Team SABCO	Chevrolet
45	Rich Bickle	Tyler Jet Motorsports	Pontiac
46	Frank Kimmel	Larry Clement Racing	Chevrolet
50	Dan Pardus	Midwest Transit Racing	Chevrolet
55	Kenny Wallace	Andy Petree Racing	Chevrolet
58	Ricky Craven	SBIII Motorsports	Ford
71	Dave Marcis	Marcis Auto Racing	Chevrolet
75	Ted Musgrave	Butch Mock Motorsports	Ford
77	Robert Pressley	Jasper Motorsports	Ford
80	Andy Hillenburg	Hover Motorsports	Ford
90	Hut Stricklin	Donlavey Racing	Ford
97	Chad Little	Roush Racing	Ford
98	Rick Mast	Cale Yarborough Motorsports	Ford

==== The Winston ====
#	Driver	Team	Make	Qualification
2	Rusty Wallace	Penske-Kranefuss Racing	Ford	Two race wins in 1998 and 1999
3	Dale Earnhardt	Richard Childress Racing	Chevrolet	Two race wins in 1998 and 1999
4	Bobby Hamilton	Morgan–McClure Motorsports	Chevrolet	One race win in 1998
5	Terry Labonte	Hendrick Motorsports	Chevrolet	Two race wins in 1998 and 1999
6	Mark Martin	Roush Racing	Ford	Eight race wins in 1998 and 1999
7	Michael Waltrip	Mattei Motorsports	Chevrolet	Previous All-Star Race winner (1996 NASCAR All-Star Race winner)
10	Ricky Rudd	Rudd Performance Motorsports	Ford	One race win in 1998
12	Jeremy Mayfield	Penske-Kranefuss Racing	Ford	One race win in 1998
18	Bobby Labonte	Joe Gibbs Racing	Pontiac	Two race wins in 1998
22	Ward Burton	Bill Davis Racing	Pontiac	Race winner from a previous year (1995 AC Delco 400)
24	Jeff Gordon	Hendrick Motorsports	Chevrolet	Sixteen race wins in 1998 and 1999
36	Ernie Irvan	MB2 Motorsports	Pontiac	Race winner from a previous year (1997 Miller 400)
40	Sterling Marlin	Team SABCO	Chevrolet	Race winner from a previous year (1996 Winston Select 500 & 1996 Pepsi 400)
43	John Andretti	Petty Enterprises	Pontiac	One race win in 1999
44	Kyle Petty	Petty Enterprises	Pontiac	Race winner from a previous year (1995 Miller Genuine Draft 500)
60	Geoff Bodine	Joe Bessey Racing	Chevrolet	Previous All-Star Race winner (1994 NASCAR All-Star Race winner)
66	Darrell Waltrip	Haas-Carter Motorsports	Ford	Past Champion (1981, 1982, and 1985 Cup Series Champion)
88	Dale Jarrett	Robert Yates Racing	Ford	Four wins in 1998 and 1999
94	Bill Elliott	Bill Elliott Racing	Ford	Past Champion (1988 Cup Series Champion)
99	Jeff Burton	Roush Racing	Ford	Four wins in 1998 and 1999
Official The Winston entry list

== Winston Open practice ==
=== First Winston Open practice and No Bull 25s lineup ===
The first Winston Open was held on Friday, May 21, at 1:00 PM EST. The session would last for 50 minutes. The speeds from the practice session would determine the lineups for the No Bull 25 races, the qualifying races for the Winston Open. Odd position drivers in the session would be placed in Race #1, and even position drivers would be placed in Race #2. Steve Park, driving for Dale Earnhardt, Inc., would set the fastest time in the session, with a lap of 29.621 and an average speed of 182.303 miles per hour (293.388 km/h), thus earning the pole for Race #1. Meanwhile, Joe Gibbs Racing driver Tony Stewart would earn the pole in Race #2, earning the second fastest time in the session.

==== Race #1 ====
Pos.	#	Driver	Team	Make	Time	Speed
1	1	Steve Park	Dale Earnhardt, Inc.	Chevrolet	29.621	182.303
2	31	Mike Skinner	Richard Childress Racing	Chevrolet	29.728	181.647
3	41	David Green	Larry Hedrick Motorsports	Chevrolet	29.871	180.777
4	23	Jimmy Spencer	Haas-Carter Motorsports	Ford	29.948	180.313
5	33	Ken Schrader	Andy Petree Racing	Chevrolet	30.018	179.892
6	11	Brett Bodine	Brett Bodine Racing	Ford	30.077	179.539
7	21	Elliott Sadler (R)	Wood Brothers Racing	Ford	30.114	179.319
8	00	Buckshot Jones (R)	Buckshot Racing	Pontiac	30.127	179.241
9	75	Ted Musgrave	Butch Mock Motorsports	Ford	30.192	178.855
10	45	Rich Bickle	Tyler Jet Motorsports	Pontiac	30.208	178.761
11	26	Johnny Benson Jr.	Roush Racing	Ford	30.305	178.188
12	90	Hut Stricklin	Donlavey Racing	Ford	30.419	177.521
13	14	Boris Said	Irvan-Simo Racing	Ford	30.495	177.078
14	71	Dave Marcis	Marcis Auto Racing	Chevrolet	30.815	175.239
15	80	Andy Hillenburg	Hover Motorsports	Ford	30.850	175.041
Official No Bull 25 Race #1 lineup

==== Race #2 ====
Pos.	#	Driver	Team	Make	Time	Speed
1	20	Tony Stewart (R)	Joe Gibbs Racing	Pontiac	29.693	181.861
2	9	Jerry Nadeau	Melling Racing	Ford	29.798	181.220
3	25	Wally Dallenbach Jr.	Hendrick Motorsports	Chevrolet	29.900	180.602
4	28	Kenny Irwin Jr.	Robert Yates Racing	Ford	29.953	180.282
5	98	Rick Mast	Cale Yarborough Motorsports	Ford	30.045	179.730
6	97	Chad Little	Roush Racing	Ford	30.087	179.480
7	42	Joe Nemechek	Team SABCO	Chevrolet	30.116	179.307
8	55	Kenny Wallace	Andy Petree Racing	Chevrolet	30.179	178.932
9	77	Robert Pressley	Jasper Motorsports	Ford	30.198	178.820
10	58	Ricky Craven	SBIII Motorsports	Ford	30.292	178.265
11	16	Kevin Lepage	Roush Racing	Ford	30.306	178.183
12	30	Derrike Cope	Bahari Racing	Pontiac	30.428	177.468
13	46	Frank Kimmel	Larry Clement Racing	Chevrolet	30.632	176.286
14	05	Morgan Shepherd	Shepherd Racing Ventures	Pontiac	30.846	175.063
15	50	Dan Pardus	Midwest Transit Racing	Chevrolet	30.870	174.927
Official No Bull 25 Race #2 lineup

=== Second Winston Open practice ===
The second practice for the Winston Open was held on Saturday, May 22, at 1:00 PM EST. The session would last for 40 minutes. Jimmy Spencer, driving for Haas-Carter Motorsports, would set the fastest time in the session, with a lap of 30.524 and an average speed of 176.910 miles per hour (284.709 km/h).

Pos.	#	Driver	Team	Make	Time	Speed
1	23	Jimmy Spencer	Haas-Carter Motorsports	Ford	30.524	176.910
2	71	Dave Marcis	Marcis Auto Racing	Chevrolet	30.595	176.499
3	28	Kenny Irwin Jr.	Robert Yates Racing	Ford	30.644	176.217
Full second Winston Open practice results

=== Final Winston Open practice ===
The final practice for the Winston Open was held on Saturday, May 22, at 2:30 PM EST. The session would last for 40 minutes. Robert Pressley, driving for Jasper Motorsports, would set the fastest time in the session, with a lap of 30.523 and an average speed of 176.916 miles per hour (284.719 km/h).

Pos.	#	Driver	Team	Make	Time	Speed
1	77	Robert Pressley	Jasper Motorsports	Ford	30.523	176.916
2	1	Steve Park (R)	Dale Earnhardt, Inc.	Chevrolet	30.548	176.771
3	71	Dave Marcis	Marcis Auto Racing	Chevrolet	30.580	176.586
Full Happy Hour Winston Open practice results

== The Winston practice ==
=== First practice ===
The first practice for The Winston was held on Friday, May 21, at 10:30 AM EST. The session would last for 55 minutes. Mark Martin, driving for Roush Racing, would set the fastest time in the session, with a lap of 29.613 and an average speed of 182.352 miles per hour (293.467 km/h).

Pos.	#	Driver	Team	Make	Time	Speed
1	6	Mark Martin	Roush Racing	Ford	29.613	182.352
2	12	Jeremy Mayfield	Penske-Kranefuss Racing	Ford	29.674	181.977
3	24	Jeff Gordon	Hendrick Motorsports	Chevrolet	29.720	181.696
Full first The Winston practice results

=== Second practice ===
The second practice for The Winston was held on Friday, May 21, at 2:10 PM EST. The session would last for one hour and 45 minutes. Jeff Gordon, driving for Hendrick Motorsports, would set the fastest time in the session, with a lap of 29.643 and an average speed of 182.168 miles per hour (293.171 km/h).

Pos.	#	Driver	Team	Make	Time	Speed
1	24	Jeff Gordon	Hendrick Motorsports	Chevrolet	29.643	182.168
2	12	Jeremy Mayfield	Penske-Kranefuss Racing	Ford	29.665	182.033
3	2	Rusty Wallace	Penske-Kranefuss Racing	Ford	29.731	181.629
Full second The Winston practice results

=== Third practice ===
The third practice for The Winston was held on Friday, May 21, after the preliminary No Bull 25 races. The session would last for 30 minutes. Bobby Labonte, driving for Joe Gibbs Racing, would set the fastest time in the session, with a lap of 30.165 and an average speed of 179.015 miles per hour (288.097 km/h).

Pos.	#	Driver	Team	Make	Time	Speed
1	18	Bobby Labonte	Joe Gibbs Racing	Pontiac	30.165	179.015
2	94	Bill Elliott	Bill Elliott Racing	Ford	30.327	178.059
3	6	Mark Martin	Roush Racing	Ford	30.354	177.901
Full third The Winston practice results

=== Fourth practice ===
The fourth practice for The Winston was held on Saturday, May 22, at 1:45 PM EST. The session would last for 55 minutes. Ward Burton, driving for Bill Davis Racing, would set the fastest time in the session, with a lap of 30.387 and an average speed of 177.708 miles per hour (285.993 km/h).

Pos.	#	Driver	Team	Make	Time	Speed
1	22	Ward Burton	Bill Davis Racing	Pontiac	30.387	177.708
2	6	Mark Martin	Roush Racing	Ford	30.429	177.462
3	2	Rusty Wallace	Penske-Kranefuss Racing	Ford	30.471	177.218
Full fourth The Winston practice results

=== Final practice ===
The final practice for The Winston was held on Saturday, May 22, at 3:15 PM EST. The session would last for 45 minutes. Jeff Gordon, driving for Hendrick Motorsports, would set the fastest time in the session, with a lap of 30.377 and an average speed of 177.766 miles per hour (286.087 km/h).

Pos.	#	Driver	Team	Make	Time	Speed
1	24	Jeff Gordon	Hendrick Motorsports	Chevrolet	30.377	177.766
2	2	Rusty Wallace	Penske-Kranefuss Racing	Ford	30.451	177.334
3	6	Mark Martin	Roush Racing	Ford	30.498	177.061
Full Happy Hour The Winston practice results

== No Bull 25s ==
The two No Bull 25 races was held on Friday, May 21. The first race would set the odd positions for the Winston Open, and the second race would set the even positions. In the first race, Richard Childress Racing driver Mike Skinner would dominate the race to earn the overall pole for the race. In the second race, Joe Gibbs Racing driver Tony Stewart would proceed to do the same in his race.

=== No Bull 25 Race #1 results ===
Fin	St	#	Driver	Team	Make	Laps	Led	Status	Winnings
1	2	31	Mike Skinner	Richard Childress Racing	Chevrolet	25	23	running	$25,637
2	4	23	Jimmy Spencer	Haas-Carter Motorsports	Ford	25	0	running	$4,137
3	5	33	Ken Schrader	Andy Petree Racing	Chevrolet	25	0	running	$3,837
4	6	11	Brett Bodine	Brett Bodine Racing	Ford	25	0	running	$3,737
5	3	41	David Green	Larry Hedrick Motorsports	Chevrolet	25	0	running	$3,637
6	10	45	Rich Bickle	Tyler Jet Motorsports	Pontiac	25	0	running	$3,437
7	11	26	Johnny Benson Jr.	Roush Racing	Ford	25	0	running	$3,337
8	8	00	Buckshot Jones (R)	Buckshot Racing	Pontiac	25	0	running	$3,237
9	9	75	Ted Musgrave	Butch Mock Motorsports	Ford	25	0	running	$3,137
10	7	21	Elliott Sadler (R)	Wood Brothers Racing	Ford	25	0	running	$3,037
11	1	1	Steve Park	Dale Earnhardt, Inc.	Chevrolet	25	2	running	$2,937
12	15	80	Andy Hillenburg	Hover Motorsports	Ford	25	0	running	$2,837
13	13	14	Boris Said	Irvan-Simo Racing	Ford	25	0	running	$2,737
14	14	71	Dave Marcis	Marcis Auto Racing	Chevrolet	21	0	engine	$2,687
15	12	90	Hut Stricklin	Donlavey Racing	Ford	9	0	engine	$2,637

=== No Bull 25 Race #2 results ===
Fin	St	#	Driver	Team	Make	Laps	Led	Status	Winnings
1	1	20	Tony Stewart (R)	Joe Gibbs Racing	Pontiac	25	25	running	$25,637
2	3	25	Wally Dallenbach Jr.	Hendrick Motorsports	Chevrolet	25	0	running	$4,137
3	4	28	Kenny Irwin Jr.	Robert Yates Racing	Ford	25	0	running	$3,837
4	11	16	Kevin Lepage	Roush Racing	Ford	25	0	running	$3,737
5	6	97	Chad Little	Roush Racing	Ford	25	0	running	$3,637
6	5	98	Rick Mast	Cale Yarborough Motorsports	Ford	25	0	running	$3,437
7	2	9	Jerry Nadeau	Melling Racing	Ford	25	0	running	$3,337
8	10	58	Ricky Craven	SBIII Motorsports	Ford	25	0	running	$3,237
9	9	77	Robert Pressley	Jasper Motorsports	Ford	25	0	running	$3,137
10	8	55	Kenny Wallace	Andy Petree Racing	Chevrolet	25	0	running	$3,037
11	7	42	Joe Nemechek	Team SABCO	Chevrolet	25	0	running	$2,937
12	15	50	Dan Pardus	Midwest Transit Racing	Chevrolet	25	0	running	$2,837
13	12	30	Derrike Cope	Bahari Racing	Pontiac	25	0	running	$2,737
14	14	05	Morgan Shepherd	Shepherd Racing Ventures	Pontiac	25	0	running	$2,687
15	13	46	Frank Kimmel	Larry Clement Racing	Chevrolet	25	0	running	$2,637

=== Winston Open lineup ===
Pos.	#	Driver	Team	Make
1	31	Mike Skinner	Richard Childress Racing	Chevrolet
2	20	Tony Stewart	Joe Gibbs Racing	Pontiac
3	23	Jimmy Spencer	Haas-Carter Motorsports	Ford
4	25	Wally Dallenbach Jr.	Hendrick Motorsports	Chevrolet
5	33	Ken Schrader	Andy Petree Racing	Chevrolet
6	28	Kenny Irwin Jr.	Robert Yates Racing	Ford
7	11	Brett Bodine	Brett Bodine Racing	Ford
8	16	Kevin Lepage	Roush Racing	Ford
9	41	David Green	Larry Hedrick Motorsports	Chevrolet
10	97	Chad Little	Roush Racing	Ford
11	45	Rich Bickle	Tyler Jet Motorsports	Pontiac
12	98	Rick Mast	Cale Yarborough Motorsports	Ford
13	26	Johnny Benson Jr.	Roush Racing	Ford
14	9	Jerry Nadeau	Melling Racing	Ford
15	00	Buckshot Jones (R)	Buckshot Racing	Pontiac
16	58	Ricky Craven	SBIII Motorsports	Ford
17	75	Ted Musgrave	Butch Mock Motorsports	Ford
18	77	Robert Pressley	Jasper Motorsports	Ford
19	21	Elliott Sadler (R)	Wood Brothers Racing	Ford
20	55	Kenny Wallace	Andy Petree Racing	Chevrolet
21	1	Steve Park	Dale Earnhardt, Inc.	Chevrolet
22	42	Joe Nemechek	Team SABCO	Chevrolet
23	80	Andy Hillenburg	Hover Motorsports	Ford
24	50	Dan Pardus	Midwest Transit Racing	Chevrolet
25	14	Boris Said	Irvan-Simo Racing	Ford
26	30	Derrike Cope	Bahari Racing	Pontiac
27	71	Dave Marcis	Marcis Auto Racing	Chevrolet
28	05	Morgan Shepherd	Shepherd Racing Ventures	Pontiac
29	90	Hut Stricklin	Donlavey Racing	Ford
30	46	Frank Kimmel	Larry Clement Racing	Chevrolet
Official Winston Open lineup

== The Winston qualifying ==
Qualifying for The Winston was held on Friday, May 21, at 7:00 PM EST. Each driver would run 3 laps each, with each driver having to do a mandatory pit stop following the driver's first or second lap.

Bobby Labonte, driving for Joe Gibbs Racing, would win the pole, setting a time of 1:50.332 and an average speed of 146.830 miles per hour (236.300 km/h).

=== Full Winston Open qualifying results ===
Pos.	#	Driver	Team	Make	Time	Speed
1	18	Bobby Labonte	Joe Gibbs Racing	Pontiac	1:50.332	146.830
2	24	Jeff Gordon	Hendrick Motorsports	Chevrolet	1:51.868	144.814
3	6	Mark Martin	Roush Racing	Ford	1:52.608	143.862
4	2	Rusty Wallace	Penske-Kranefuss Racing	Ford	1:53.078	143.264
5	3	Dale Earnhardt	Richard Childress Racing	Chevrolet	1:53.408	142.847
6	88	Dale Jarrett	Robert Yates Racing	Ford	1:53.468	142.772
7	60	Geoff Bodine	Joe Bessey Racing	Chevrolet	1:53.498	142.734
8	94	Bill Elliott	Bill Elliott Racing	Ford	1:53.504	142.726
9	7	Michael Waltrip	Mattei Motorsports	Chevrolet	1:53.519	142.707
10	4	Bobby Hamilton	Morgan–McClure Motorsports	Chevrolet	1:53.601	142.604
11	40	Sterling Marlin	Team SABCO	Chevrolet	1:54.056	142.035
12	36	Ernie Irvan	MB2 Motorsports	Pontiac	1:54.192	141.866
13	5	Terry Labonte	Hendrick Motorsports	Chevrolet	1:54.857	141.045
14	44	Kyle Petty	Petty Enterprises	Pontiac	1:55.556	140.192
15	43	John Andretti	Petty Enterprises	Pontiac	1:56.033	139.615
16	99	Jeff Burton	Roush Racing	Ford	1:56.427	139.143
17	66	Darrell Waltrip	Haas-Carter Motorsports	Ford	1:58.623	136.567
18	12	Jeremy Mayfield	Penske-Kranefuss Racing	Ford	1:58.841	136.317
19	10	Ricky Rudd	Rudd Performance Motorsports	Ford	2:05.585	128.996
20	22	Ward Burton	Bill Davis Racing	Pontiac	-	-
Official The Winston qualifying results

== Winston Open race results ==
Fin	St	#	Driver	Team	Make	Laps	Led	Status	Winnings
1	2	20	Tony Stewart	Joe Gibbs Racing	Pontiac	50	49	running	$33,460
2	3	23	Jimmy Spencer	Haas-Carter Motorsports	Ford	50	0	running	$23,460
3	5	33	Ken Schrader	Andy Petree Racing	Chevrolet	50	0	running	$20,460
4	13	26	Johnny Benson Jr.	Roush Racing	Ford	50	0	running	$18,460
5	21	1	Steve Park	Dale Earnhardt, Inc.	Chevrolet	50	0	running	$16,460
6	10	97	Chad Little	Roush Racing	Ford	50	0	running	$14,460
7	6	28	Kenny Irwin Jr.	Robert Yates Racing	Ford	50	0	running	$12,460
8	4	25	Wally Dallenbach Jr.	Hendrick Motorsports	Chevrolet	50	0	running	$11,460
9	20	55	Kenny Wallace	Andy Petree Racing	Chevrolet	50	0	running	$10,960
10	22	42	Joe Nemechek	Team SABCO	Chevrolet	50	0	running	$9,960
11	17	75	Ted Musgrave	Butch Mock Motorsports	Ford	50	0	running	$8,960
12	1	31	Mike Skinner	Richard Childress Racing	Chevrolet	50	1	running	$8,460
13	7	11	Brett Bodine	Brett Bodine Racing	Ford	50	0	running	$7,460
14	19	21	Elliott Sadler (R)	Wood Brothers Racing	Ford	50	0	running	$7,360
15	8	16	Kevin Lepage	Roush Racing	Ford	50	0	running	$7,260
16	14	9	Jerry Nadeau	Melling Racing	Ford	50	0	running	$7,160
17	15	00	Buckshot Jones (R)	Buckshot Racing	Pontiac	50	0	running	$7,060
18	29	90	Hut Stricklin	Donlavey Racing	Ford	50	0	running	$6,960
19	27	71	Dave Marcis	Marcis Auto Racing	Chevrolet	50	0	running	$6,860
20	18	77	Robert Pressley	Jasper Motorsports	Ford	50	0	running	$6,760
21	25	14	Boris Said	Irvan-Simo Racing	Ford	50	0	running	$6,660
22	30	46	Frank Kimmel	Larry Clement Racing	Chevrolet	50	0	running	$6,560
23	28	05	Morgan Shepherd	Shepherd Racing Ventures	Pontiac	50	0	running	$6,460
24	26	30	Derrike Cope	Bahari Racing	Pontiac	50	0	running	$6,360
25	23	80	Andy Hillenburg	Hover Motorsports	Ford	47	0	running	$6,260
26	12	98	Rick Mast	Cale Yarborough Motorsports	Ford	41	0	electrical	$6,160
27	11	45	Rich Bickle	Tyler Jet Motorsports	Pontiac	37	0	ignition	$6,060
28	16	58	Ricky Craven	SBIII Motorsports	Ford	24	0	accident	$5,960
29	24	50	Dan Pardus	Midwest Transit Racing	Chevrolet	23	0	accident	$5,860
30	9	41	David Green	Larry Hedrick Motorsports	Chevrolet	10	0	handling	$5,760
Official Winston Open results

== The Winston race results ==
Fin	St	#	Driver	Team	Make	Laps	Led	Status	Winnings
1	13	5	Terry Labonte	Hendrick Motorsports	Chevrolet	70	24	running	$207,500
2	21	20	Tony Stewart (R)	Joe Gibbs Racing	Pontiac	70	5	running	$155,037
3	2	24	Jeff Gordon	Hendrick Motorsports	Chevrolet	70	34	running	$160,000
4	5	3	Dale Earnhardt	Richard Childress Racing	Chevrolet	70	2	running	$30,000
5	18	12	Jeremy Mayfield	Penske-Kranefuss Racing	Ford	70	0	running	$34,500
6	7	60	Geoff Bodine	Joe Bessey Racing	Chevrolet	70	0	running	$25,000
7	11	40	Sterling Marlin	Team SABCO	Chevrolet	70	0	running	$38,000
8	9	7	Michael Waltrip	Mattei Motorsports	Chevrolet	70	0	running	$21,500
9	8	94	Bill Elliott	Bill Elliott Racing	Ford	70	0	running	$20,500
10	15	43	John Andretti	Petty Enterprises	Pontiac	70	0	running	$19,500
11	17	66	Darrell Waltrip	Haas-Carter Motorsports	Ford	70	0	running	$19,000
12	10	4	Bobby Hamilton	Morgan–McClure Motorsports	Chevrolet	69	0	running	$18,500
13	14	44	Kyle Petty	Petty Enterprises	Pontiac	68	0	running	$18,000
14	20	22	Ward Burton	Bill Davis Racing	Pontiac	65	0	handling	$18,000
15	1	18	Bobby Labonte	Joe Gibbs Racing	Pontiac	11	5	Accident	$68,000
16	3	6	Mark Martin	Roush Racing	Ford	11	0	accident	$23,000
17	4	2	Rusty Wallace	Penske-Kranefuss Racing	Ford	11	0	accident	$18,000
18	12	36	Ernie Irvan	MB2 Motorsports	Pontiac	11	0	accident	$18,000
19	6	88	Dale Jarrett	Robert Yates Racing	Ford	11	0	accident	$18,000
20	16	99	Jeff Burton	Roush Racing	Ford	11	0	accident	$18,000
21	19	10	Ricky Rudd	Rudd Performance Motorsports	Ford	11	0	accident	$18,000
Official The Winston race results
