= TNN Motor Sports =

Television sports programming specializing in auto sports

TNN Motor Sports/TNN Sports
- Former Division of: TNN (now Paramount Network) (original)
- Parent: Gaylord (1983-1997); Westinghouse-CBS (1997-2000); Viacom (2000-2003); Luken Communications & Jim Owens Entertainment (2012-present)
- Launched: 1983 (original)
- Dissolved: 2003 (original)
- Website: http://www.watchtnn.com

TNN Motor Sports was a sports programming block on The Nashville Network from the network's launch in 1983 to 2000. TNN Motor Sports specialized in coverage of motorsports of various formats, most commonly auto racing. From 2000 to 2003, the network expanded its offerings to include alternative professional football and rebranded the block as TNN Sports. The block shut down in TNN's 2003 rebranding as Spike TV.

== History ==
TNN Motor Sports began when the network itself launched in 1983. During that time, TNN started airing a motor sports and auto racing themed program during the racing season known as American Sports Cavalcade. American Sports Cavalcade was produced by a production company called Diamond P Sports. On the very first episode, the sport of swamp buggy racing from Naples, Florida, was featured. Diamond P produced all of TNN's motor sports coverage through 1992. Then, in 1993, TNN began working with World Sports Enterprises to produce their NASCAR coverage, and Group 5 Sports to produce their coverage of the ASA. Diamond P would continue to produce most of the rest of their motor sports coverage.

TNN had a self-operating and self-promoting sub-division called TNN Motor Sports, and aired races produced by that division from 1991 to 2000. Under the TNN Motor Sports umbrella, NASCAR series races (including those of the then-Winston Cup Series and Busch Grand National Series, as well as the Craftsman Truck Series) were the most prominently featured, but other racing organizations, such as IRL, IMSA and SCCA sports car series, ASA stock car series, USAC and World of Outlaws sprint car series, the NHRA drag racing series, AMA supercross and superbikes, and monster truck racing and truck and tractor pulling from TNT Motorsports were also showcased. From 1991–2001, TNN aired the RaceDay magazine show on Sunday mornings, anchored first by Pat Patterson and later by Rick Benjamin.

In 1995, the motorsports operations were moved into the industrial park located at Charlotte Motor Speedway in Concord, North Carolina, where TNN had purchased a controlling interest in World Sports Enterprises, a motorsports production company, from WSE's founder Ken Squier.

Also by 1995, Westinghouse Electric Corporation, who at the time owned the CBS networks and had an existing relationship with TNN through its Group W division, purchased TNN and its sister network CMT outright to form CBS Cable, along with a short-lived startup network entitled Eye On People. TNN's ties to CBS allowed it to carry CBS Sports' run overs, which happened during a NASCAR Busch Series race at Texas Motor Speedway in 1999; the 1998 Pepsi 400 was also moved to TNN when the race was postponed from the then-traditional July date to October 17, 1998, as a result of the 1998 Florida wildfires. Other motorsports events during this era were broadcast under the banner of Motor Madness.

Starting in 2000, the name changed from TNN Motor Sports to TNN Sports when the network started airing games from the Arena Football League, through a sublicensing agreement with ESPN Regional Television. TNN also aired XFL football games in 2001 as part of a new television deal between the World Wrestling Federation and TNN's parent company, Viacom.

== The end of TNN Sports ==
In 2000, as a result of a new television deal with Fox, NBC, and TBS (later moving to TNT) beginning with the 2001 season, TNN (and CBS) lost broadcast rights to NASCAR after nearly ten years of live coverage; not to mention TNN's tape delay coverage of NASCAR in the 1980s on American Sports Cavalcade. Coverage of NHRA Drag Racing also ended for the network that year (with exclusive coverage of the NHRA going to ESPN/ESPN2); though the network would continue to air other motorsports events until the 2004 Champ Car season. TNN's football coverage also ended when the XFL folded after just one season while Arena Football League games moved to NBC beginning with the 2003 season.

The loss of Arena Football, the XFL, and motorsports coverage, as well as the network being rebranded to Spike TV, resulted in the end of TNN Sports in 2003. Eventually, CBS and Spike would end up under separately operated companies in 2006, leaving Viacom (the company that ended up with Spike) without a sports unit. However, in late 2019, Viacom and CBS re-merged as ViacomCBS (now Paramount Skydance). Spike was rebranded as Paramount Network on January 18, 2018.

During the eleven-month revival of TNN between November 2012 and October 2013, the revived network did not acquire any sports rights, motorsports or otherwise. That channel has since rebranded as Heartland; the channel's owner, Luken Communications, went bankrupt in 2013 due to an unrelated legal settlement and was unable to maintain the licensing fee for the TNN brand. Had the TNN brand survived until 2014, it is possible that Fall Experimental Football League games could have been aired on the station; Luken was one of several companies to gain the television rights to FXFL games in 2014.

== See also ==
- NASCAR on TNN
