= 2000 The Winston =

16th annual NASCAR all-star race

- Race details
Date	May 20, 2000
Location	Lowe's Motor Speedway in Concord, North Carolina
Course	Permanent racing facility 1.5 mi (2.4 km)
Distance	Winston Open: 30 laps, 45 mi (72 km); No Bull Sprint: 16 laps, 24 mi (39 km); The Winston: 70 laps, 105 mi (169 km)
Avg Speed	The Winston: 167.035 mph (268.817 km/h)
- Winston Open
Pole position	Jerry Nadeau (Hendrick Motorsports)
Winner	Steve Park (Dale Earnhardt, Inc.)
- No Bull Sprint
Pole position	Mike Skinner (Richard Childress Racing)
Winner	Jerry Nadeau (Hendrick Motorsports)
- The Winston
Pole position	Bill Elliott (Bill Elliott Racing); 105.932 seconds
Showdown transfers	Steve Park (Open winner); Jerry Nadeau (No Bull Sprint winner)
Most laps led	Bill Elliott (Bill Elliott Racing); 36 laps
Winner	Dale Earnhardt Jr. (Dale Earnhardt, Inc.)
- Television
Network	TNN
Announcers	Eli Gold, Buddy Baker, and Dick Berggren

The 2000 edition of The Winston was held on May 20, 2000, at Lowe's Motor Speedway in Concord, North Carolina. This was the 16th running of the event. The race is remembered for Dale Earnhardt Jr. becoming the first rookie to win The Winston. Drivers Steve Park and Jerry Nadeau advanced to the main lineup, with Park winning the Winston Open and Nadeau winning the No Bull Sprint race. This was the last All-Star Race of Darrell Waltrip and Dale Earnhardt; Waltrip retired at the end of 2000 and called the 2001 race from the booth for Fox Sports, and Earnhardt was killed at the season-opening Daytona 500. This was Kenny Irwin Jr.'s only appearance in The Winston, as he was killed in a crash during practice at New Hampshire Motor Speedway on July 7. In addition, this was TNN's final broadcast of The Winston.

The event is also remembered for one of the biggest disasters in NASCAR history: the post-race collapse of a pedestrian walkway that injured 107 people.

== Background ==
Lowe's Motor Speedway, the track where the race was held.

The Winston was open to race winners from last season through the Pontiac Excitement 400 at Richmond International Raceway and all previous All-Star race winners and NASCAR Winston Cup champions who had attempted to qualify for every race in 2000 were eligible to compete in the All-Star Race.

=== 2000 The Winston drivers and eligibility ===
==== Race winners in 1999 and 2000 ====
- 2-Rusty Wallace (2 wins from 1999 and 2000)
- 3-Dale Earnhardt (4 wins from 1999 and 2000, including the 1999 Winston 500)
- 5-Terry Labonte (1 win in 1999)
- 6-Mark Martin (3 wins from 1999 and 2000)
- 8-Dale Earnhardt Jr. (2 wins in 2000)
- 12-Jeremy Mayfield (1 win in 2000)
- 18-Bobby Labonte (6 wins from 1999 and 2000)
- 20-Tony Stewart (3 wins in 1999)
- 22-Ward Burton (1 win in 2000)
- 24-Jeff Gordon (8 wins from 1999 and 2000, including the 1999 Daytona 500)
- 33-Joe Nemechek (1 win in 1999)
- 43-John Andretti (1 win in 1999)
- 88-Dale Jarrett (5 wins from 1999 and 2000, including the 2000 Daytona 500 and the 1999 Brickyard 400)
- 99-Jeff Burton (7 wins from 1999 and 2000, including the 1999 Coca-Cola 600 and the 1999 Southern 500)

==== Winning team owners in 1999 and 2000 ====
- 42-Team SABCO with new driver Kenny Irwin Jr. (1 win in 1999 with Joe Nemechek)

==== Previous NASCAR Winston Cup Champions ====
- 66-Darrell Waltrip (NASCAR Winston Cup Series champion in 1981, 1982, and 1985)
- 94-Bill Elliott (1988 NASCAR Winston Cup Series champion)

==== Previous winners of The Winston ====
- 7-Michael Waltrip (1996 The Winston Select winner)

==== Winners of The Winston Open and No Bull Sprint ====
- 1-Steve Park (The Winston Open winner)
- 25-Jerry Nadeau (No Bull Sprint winner)

== The Winston Open/No Bull Sprint ==
Jerry Nadeau won the pole for The Winston Open and led 14 laps, but it was Steve Park who won the 30-lap race and earned $35,000. The only caution of the race occurred after the first lap when Geoff Bodine and Dave Marcis collided with each other in turn four. Mike Skinner was the pole sitter for the No Bull Sprint and led nine laps, but finished 15th while Nadeau won the 16-lap race and earned $25,000. Two cautions occurred in the race caused by two crashes: Chad Little on lap six and Elliott Sadler on lap 10.

Both Park and Nadeau advanced to The Winston. This also marked the first time Ricky Rudd failed to make The Winston after having participated in the past 15 events.

== The Winston ==
=== Segment 1 ===
Bill Elliott won the pole for The Winston, with Mark Martin starting on outside pole. Despite having not won a race, Kenny Irwin Jr. made the starting grid based on the No. 42 team's win in 1999 with Joe Nemechek, who switched to the No. 33 team in 2000. The first caution occurred before the first lap when Irwin tangled with Dale Earnhardt and got loose in turn four, sending John Andretti hard on the outside wall. Michael Waltrip brought out the second caution on lap 24 when he spun loose and crashed in turn two. Elliott led all 30 laps of Segment 1, earning him $50,000.

Segment results

1. 94-Bill Elliott ($50,000)
2. 6-Mark Martin ($15,000)
3. 8-Dale Earnhardt Jr. ($7,500)

=== Segment 2 ===
It was decided by lottery that the top 12 finishers were to be inverted for Segment 2, with Nemechek and Jeremy Mayfield in the front row. The caution was triggered on lap 38 when Jeff Gordon spun loose in turn two and caused a wreck that involved Steve Park, Earnhardt Sr., and Jeff Burton. Dale Earnhardt Jr. made two pit stops due to a loose lug nut on his left rear tire while Park, Earnhardt Sr., and Gordon had their cars mended during the caution. Upon the restart, Mayfield lost third gear and was forced to retire from the race. On lap 50, Earnhardt Jr. hit the outside wall in turn four, but the damage was not significant enough to cause a tire rub. The caution came out on lap 54, when Tony Stewart nudged Martin towards the backstretch wall; Martin also collided with Ward Burton before his car caught fire. Elliott once again had the dominant car, winning Segment 2 and earning another $50,000.

Segment results

1. 94-Bill Elliott ($50,000)
2. 88-Dale Jarrett ($15,000)
3. 8-Dale Earnhardt Jr. ($7,500)

=== Segment 3 ===
Elliott and Dale Jarrett led the field for Segment 3. Park and Nemechek tangled on lap 62, resulting in a multi-car pileup in turn one that took them out along with Stewart and Gordon to bring out the final caution. The incident also caused an adverse handling effect on Elliott's car, as he lost the lead to Jarrett and faded out of the top five. Upon the restart, both Earnhardts rebounded in the top three as smoke suddenly started to appear in the rear end of Jarrett's car. With two laps to go, Earnhardt Jr. overtook Jarrett and won The Winston, earning him $500,000 and making him the first rookie to win the event.

The victory celebration was held in front of the main grandstand instead of victory lane, which was left vacant for this race and the 2000 Coca-Cola 600 in memory of Adam Petty, who was killed in a practice crash at New Hampshire Motor Speedway on May 12, 2000.

Race results
Pos	Grid	Car	Driver	Owner	Manufacturer	Laps run	Laps led
1	5	8	Dale Earnhardt Jr.	Dale Earnhardt, Inc.	Chevrolet	70	2
2	7	88	Dale Jarrett	Robert Yates Racing	Ford	70	8
3	12	3	Dale Earnhardt	Richard Childress Racing	Chevrolet	70	0
4	20	25	Jerry Nadeau	Hendrick Motorsports	Chevrolet	70	0
5	8	99	Jeff Burton	Roush Racing	Ford	70	0
6	10	5	Terry Labonte	Hendrick Motorsports	Chevrolet	70	0
7	4	2	Rusty Wallace	Penske Racing South	Ford	70	0
8	1	94	Bill Elliott	Bill Elliott Racing	Ford	70	36
9	3	18	Bobby Labonte	Joe Gibbs Racing	Pontiac	70	0
10	13	22	Ward Burton	Bill Davis Racing	Pontiac	70	0
11	17	66	Darrell Waltrip	Haas-Carter Motorsports	Ford	70	0
12	16	42	Kenny Irwin Jr.	Team SABCO	Chevrolet	69	0
13	19	1	Steve Park	Dale Earnhardt, Inc.	Chevrolet	62	0
14	14	33	Joe Nemechek	Andy Petree Racing	Chevrolet	62	19
15	6	20	Tony Stewart	Joe Gibbs Racing	Pontiac	62	0
16	11	24	Jeff Gordon	Hendrick Motorsports	Chevrolet	62	0
17	2	6	Mark Martin	Roush Racing	Ford	54	0
18	9	12	Jeremy Mayfield	Penske Racing South	Ford	40	5
19	15	7	Michael Waltrip	Mattei Motorsports	Chevrolet	24	0
20	18	43	John Andretti	Petty Enterprises	Pontiac	0	0

== Bridge collapse ==
After the race, as fans crowded across one of the track's pedestrian bridge walkways to a nearby parking lot, an 80-foot (24 m) section of the walkway fell 17 feet (5.2 m) onto a highway, injuring 107 people. Nearly 50 lawsuits against the speedway resulted from the incident, with many being settled out of court. Investigators said the bridge builder, Tindall Corp., used an improper additive to help the concrete filler at the bridge's center cure faster. The additive contained calcium chloride, which corroded the structure's steel cables and led to the collapse.
