= 1997 The Winston =

13th iteration of the NASCAR All-Star Race

Race details
- Race 2 of 2 exhibition races in the 1997 NASCAR Winston Cup Series
- Date: May 17, 1997
- Location: Concord, North Carolina
- Course: Charlotte Motor Speedway
- Course length: 1.5 miles (2.4 km)
- Distance: 70 laps, 105 mi (169 km)
- Weather: Temperatures around 78.6 °F (25.9 °C), with winds gusting to 12.6 miles per hour (20.3 km/h)
- Average speed: 157.895 mph (254.107 km/h)

Pole position
| Driver | Bill Elliott | Bill Elliott Racing |

Most laps led
| Driver | Bobby Labonte | Joe Gibbs Racing |
- Laps: 17

Winner
| No. 24 | Jeff Gordon | Hendrick Motorsports |

Television in the United States
- Network: TNN
- Announcers: Eli Gold, Buddy Baker, and Dick Berggren

The 1997 edition of The Winston was a stock car racing competition that took place on May 17, 1997. Held at Charlotte Motor Speedway in Concord, North Carolina, the 70-lap race was an exhibition race in the 1997 NASCAR Winston Cup Series. Bill Elliott of Bill Elliott Racing won the pole. Bobby Labonte of Joe Gibbs Racing led the most laps with 17 of the 70 laps. Jeff Gordon of Hendrick Motorsports won the race and claimed his second All-Star Race win in a car that was nicknamed "T-Rex" after its Jurassic Park: The Ride paint scheme. The car was deemed controversial at the time due to its dominant performance in the race that NASCAR banned it from being used in further races.

== Background ==
Charlotte Motor Speedway, the track where the race was held.

After the 1996 All-Star Race featured Michael Waltrip, who made the race in the final transfer position in the All-Star Open, the format was switched again to return to a "winners only" format. All drivers and teams that won in the 1996 season and the first races of the 1997 season to the 1997 Winston 500 at Talladega Superspeedway were exempt. That was followed by all previous All-Star Race winners and Cup Series Champions who had attempted to qualify for every race in 1997. Returning to the 1987-90 format, the most recent race winners who were not exempt earned exemptions until the field reached 19. At that point, the winner of the All-Star Open was added for a 20-car field.

=== 1997 The Winston Select drivers and eligibility ===
==== Race winners in 1996 and 1997 ====
- 2-Rusty Wallace (2 wins in 1996)
- 3-Dale Earnhardt (1 win in 1996)
- 4-Sterling Marlin (1 win in 1996)
- 5-Terry Labonte (2 wins in 1996)
- 6-Mark Martin (2 wins in 1997)
- 7-Geoff Bodine (1 win in 1996)
- 10-Ricky Rudd (1 win in 1996)
- 18-Bobby Labonte (1 win in 1996)
- 24-Jeff Gordon (14 wins from 1996 and 1997, including the 1997 Daytona 500)
- 28-Ernie Irvan (2 wins in 1996)
- 43-Bobby Hamilton (1 win in 1996)
- 88-Dale Jarrett (6 wins from 1996 and 1997, including the 1996 Daytona 500)
- 99-Jeff Burton (1 win in 1997)

==== Previous winners of All-Star Race ====
- 21-Michael Waltrip (1996 NASCAR All-Star Race winner)

==== Previous NASCAR Cup Series Champions ====
- 17-Darrell Waltrip (1981, 1982, and 1985 Cup Series Champion)
- 94-Bill Elliott (1988 Cup Series Champion)

==== Race winners from previous years, not eligible by the above criteria ====
- 22-Ward Burton 1995 ACDelco 400 - October 1995
- 44-Kyle Petty 1995 Miller 500 - June 1995
- 23-Jimmy Spencer 1994 DieHard 500 - July 1994

==== All-Star Open winner ====
- 25-Ricky Craven

== Race summary ==
=== Segment 1 ===
Bill Elliott won the pole for the all-star event with a lap time of 143.273 mph (230.576 km/h). Rusty Wallace, Mark Martin, Darrell Waltrip, Jeff Gordon, and Elliott served as onboard camera cars throughout the race. Elliott led the field before lap 4, when Martin accidentally spun Bobby Labonte on the frontstretch, triggering a caution that lasted for five laps. When the race returned to green on lap 9, Dale Earnhardt, sporting a special Wheaties paint scheme, took the lead until lap 12, when he and Dale Jarrett fought for the position for the rest of the segment. On lap 18, Bobby Hamilton and Ernie Irvan retired from the race due to engine problems. Jarrett took the lead back from Earnhardt and crossed the finish line on lap 30 to collect the $50,000 bonus while Gordon, who had to start at the back of the field after overshooting pit lane during qualifying, charged forward to a third-place finish.

Segment results

1. 88-Dale Jarrett ($50,000)
2. 3-Dale Earnhardt ($15,000)
3. 24-Jeff Gordon ($7,500)

=== Segment 2 ===
During the 10-minute break between segments, the fan balloting on whether or not to invert the field for the second 30-lap segment was unveiled. The fans had spoken and the result flashed on the Winston Cup scoreboard — INVERT!

Jarrett was sent to the rear of the field, while Terry Labonte and Bobby Labonte assumed the front row. By lap 44, Bobby Labonte overtook his brother and held the lead until the end of the caution-free Segment 2 to collect his $50,000 bonus. Terry Labonte crossed the line second and Ricky Craven finished third. Meanwhile, Gordon, who was shuffled toward the back of the field, finished fourth.

Segment results

1. 18-Bobby Labonte ($50,000)
2. 5-Terry Labonte ($15,000)
3. 25-Ricky Craven ($7,500)

=== Segment 3 ===
For the final 10-lap shootout, Terry Labonte led the field, but on lap 62, Wallace's day ended after his engine expired. Meanwhile, on the same lap, Gordon overtook Terry Labonte for the lead and kept it to win the caution-free segment and earn $200,000. Bobby and Terry Labonte finished out the top-three.

Race results
| Pos | Grid | Car | Driver | Owner | Manufacturer | Laps run | Laps led |
|---|---|---|---|---|---|---|---|
| 1 | 19 | 24 | Jeff Gordon | Hendrick Motorsports | Chevrolet | 70 | 9 |
| 2 | 5 | 18 | Bobby Labonte | Joe Gibbs Racing | Pontiac | 70 | 17 |
| 3 | 11 | 5 | Terry Labonte | Hendrick Motorsports | Chevrolet | 70 | 14 |
| 4 | 2 | 3 | Dale Earnhardt | Richard Childress Racing | Chevrolet | 70 | 11 |
| 5 | 18 | 23 | Jimmy Spencer | Travis Carter Enterprises | Ford | 70 | 0 |
| 6 | 8 | 6 | Mark Martin | Roush Racing | Ford | 70 | 0 |
| 7 | 6 | 88 | Dale Jarrett | Robert Yates Racing | Ford | 70 | 11 |
| 8 | 20 | 25 | Ricky Craven | Hendrick Motorsports | Chevrolet | 70 | 0 |
| 9 | 12 | 10 | Ricky Rudd | Rudd Performance Motorsports | Ford | 70 | 0 |
| 10 | 1 | 94 | Bill Elliott | Bill Elliott Racing | Ford | 70 | 8 |
| 11 | 10 | 7 | Geoff Bodine | Geoff Bodine Racing | Ford | 70 | 0 |
| 12 | 9 | 99 | Jeff Burton | Roush Racing | Ford | 70 | 0 |
| 13 | 14 | 22 | Ward Burton | Bill Davis Racing | Pontiac | 70 | 0 |
| 14 | 15 | 44 | Kyle Petty | Petty Enterprises | Pontiac | 70 | 0 |
| 15 | 3 | 4 | Sterling Marlin | Morgan–McClure Motorsports | Chevrolet | 70 | 0 |
| 16 | 4 | 21 | Michael Waltrip | Wood Brothers Racing | Ford | 70 | 0 |
| 17 | 17 | 17 | Darrell Waltrip | Darrell Waltrip Motorsports | Chevrolet | 70 | 0 |
| 18 | 7 | 2 | Rusty Wallace | Penske Racing South | Ford | 62 | 0 |
| 19 | 16 | 28 | Ernie Irvan | Robert Yates Racing | Ford | 18 | 0 |
| 20 | 13 | 43 | Bobby Hamilton | Petty Enterprises | Pontiac | 18 | 0 |

== Aftermath ==
Following the race, NASCAR modified the rule book to ban the "T-Rex" chassis from further competition. Crew chief Ray Evernham had tweaked the car's aerodynamics and unsprung weight, resulting in a very fast car that nevertheless passed inspection. The car is currently on display at the Hendrick Motorsports Museum.
