= 1992 The Winston =

Eighth iteration of the NASCAR All-Star Race

Race details
- Race 2 of 2 exhibition races in the 1992 NASCAR Winston Cup Series
- Date: May 16, 1992
- Location: Concord, North Carolina
- Course: Charlotte Motor Speedway
- Course length: 1.5 miles (2.4 km)
- Distance: 70 laps, 105 mi (169 km)
- Weather: Temperatures around 74 °F (23 °C), with winds gusting to 8 miles per hour (13 km/h)
- Average speed: 132.678 mph (213.525 km/h)

Pole position
Driver	Davey Allison	Robert Yates Racing

Most laps led
Driver	Davey Allison	Robert Yates Racing
- Laps: 26

Winner
No. 28	Davey Allison	Robert Yates Racing

Television in the United States
- Network: TNN
- Announcers: Mike Joy, Neil Bonnett, and Buddy Baker

The 1992 edition of The Winston was a stock car racing competition that took place on May 16, 1992. Held at Charlotte Motor Speedway in Concord, North Carolina, the 70-lap race was an exhibition race in the 1992 NASCAR Winston Cup Series. This was the first broadcast of The Winston on TNN, which aired the event until 2000. It was also better known as One Hot Night because it was the first ever race that was held on a superspeedway at night. Davey Allison of Robert Yates Racing won the pole, led the most laps, and won the race. This was also the final appearance of Richard Petty and Alan Kulwicki at The Winston; Petty retired at the end of the season and Kulwicki was killed in a plane crash on April 1, 1993.

== Background ==
Charlotte Motor Speedway, the track where the race was held.

The 1992 All-Star Race (as now referred by NASCAR), featured a slight modification to the format. As was the case in the past, winning drivers and team owners from last season through the 1992 Winston 500 at Talladega Superspeedway were exempt. New to the event was exemptions for Cup Series Champions and All-Star Race winners, provided they were a full-time driver. This allowed Richard Petty (in his final season) and Terry Labonte to be slotted into the field. With only 18 drivers eligible, the two drivers in the All-Star Open were added to fill the field to 20.

=== 1992 The Winston drivers and eligibility ===
==== Race winners in 1991 and 1992 ====
- 2-Rusty Wallace (2 wins in 1991)
- 3-Dale Earnhardt (4 wins in 1991)
- 4-Ernie Irvan (2 wins in 1991, including the 1991 Daytona 500)
- 5-Ricky Rudd (1 win in 1991)
- 6-Mark Martin (2 wins from 1991 and 1992)
- 7-Alan Kulwicki (2 wins from 1991 and 1992)
- 11-Bill Elliott (5 wins from 1991 and 1992)
- 15-Geoff Bodine (1 win in 1991)
- 17-Darrell Waltrip (1 win in 1991)
- 18-Dale Jarrett (1 win in 1991)
- 25-Ken Schrader (2 wins in 1991)
- 28-Davey Allison (8 wins from 1991 and 1992, including the 1992 Daytona 500)
- 33-Harry Gant (5 wins in 1991)
- 42-Kyle Petty (1 win in 1991)

==== Winning team owners in 1991 and 1992 ====
- 9-Melling Racing with new driver Dave Mader III (1 win in 1991 with Bill Elliott)
- 21-Wood Brothers Racing with new driver Morgan Shepherd (1 win in 1991 with Dale Jarrett)

==== Previous NASCAR Winston Cup Champions ====
- 43-Richard Petty (7-time NASCAR Winston Cup Series Champion)
- 94-Terry Labonte (1984 NASCAR Winston Cup Series Champion)

==== Top two finishers of The Winston Open ====
- 12-Hut Stricklin (finished second)
- 30-Michael Waltrip (finished first)

== Race summary ==
At the very end of the race, Kyle Petty and Dale Earnhardt were battling for the lead, and heading into turn three, Petty spun Earnhardt and Davey Allison stalked Petty at the final corner. They were side-by-side and Allison beat him at the line, and then was spun out and crashed into the wall hard and slid all the way into turn one. Allison was taken to the hospital and did not celebrate in victory lane. It was considered one of the most memorable moments in all-star race history. That was also Allison's second straight victory in the event. In The Winston Open, Michael Waltrip and Hut Stricklin finished first and second, respectively, to make the starting grid. It was also the first time that past champions were eligible, even though they did not win (Richard Petty and Terry Labonte).

=== Segment 1 ===
Allison won the pole for the all-star event and the accompanying $50,000 bonus from Winston on Friday evening during the unique three-lap, two-tire pit stop qualifying run. Geoff Bodine served as the onboard camera car throughout the race. When the green flag flew for the first 30-lap segment, Allison jumped out to the early lead and showed the field his heels for the entire 30 circuits, earning him another $50,000 bonus.

Segment results

1. 28-Davey Allison ($50,000)
2. 11-Bill Elliott ($15,000)
3. 2-Rusty Wallace ($7,500)

=== Segment 2 ===
During the 10-minute break between segments, the fan balloting on whether or not to invert the field for the second 30-lap segment was unveiled. The fans had spoken and the result flashed on the Winston Cup scoreboard — INVERT!

Allison and his lightning-fast Ford Thunderbird was sent to the rear of the field, while Bodine assumed the point. Two laps into the second segment, Richard Petty moved into second and worked on Bodine in a valiant effort for the lead. But four laps into the second segment, Kyle Petty blew by both his father and Bodine to take over first. After a spirited battle with Ernie Irvan and Dale Earnhardt, Kyle Petty cruised on to a two-second victory over Irvan to collect the $50,000 bonus for winning the second segment. Allison had charged all the way back to sixth. So, the final stage was set.

Segment results

1. 42-Kyle Petty ($50,000)
2. 4-Ernie Irvan ($15,000)
3. 3-Dale Earnhardt ($7,500)

=== Segment 3 ===
For the final 10-lap shootout, Earnhardt muscled his way past Irvan for second. That close racing allowed Kyle Petty to sprint out to a substantial lead. With Kyle Petty pulling away, it appeared nobody would be able to catch him, but on the third lap, Darrell Waltrip was tapped from the rear, sending him dirt-tracking through the tri-oval grass in front of the main grandstand. Waltrip nearly corrected his Chevrolet Lumina, but stalled momentarily at the end of pit road, prompting the first and only caution of the final segment. The caution erased a 3.5 second Petty lead.

Caution flag laps do not count in the final segment, setting up a seven-lap dash. During all the action, Allison had moved into third, making it Kyle Petty, Earnhardt and Allison at the restart. On the restart, Kyle Petty held his own for one lap. But with five laps remaining, Earnhardt drove past Kyle Petty for the lead. At the white flag, Earnhardt led, Kyle Petty was a close second and Allison was third. Down the backstretch, Kyle Petty took a run at Earnhardt. Earnhardt reacted by forcing Petty down on the backstretch apron. Meanwhile, Allison inched closer to the leaders. Going into turn three, both Earnhardt and Kyle Petty were too low and going full speed. Earnhardt hit the corner first and lost control of his Chevrolet in the middle of the turn. Kyle Petty lifted from the throttle for just a split second to gather his Pontiac Grand Prix. While Kyle Petty checked up, Allison continued at full throttle and got a strong drive off of turn four. Allison pulled to the inside of Kyle Petty in the middle of the tri-oval, and had the momentum. Kyle Petty and Allison touched twice before Allison inched ahead to take the checkered flag. The two touched again as they crossed the start-finish line, sending Allison's Texaco Ford spinning wildly into the frontstraight wall. The car hit hard on the driver's side before a trail of sparks led to its final resting place in the infield grass. Allison, who was momentarily knocked unconscious, was removed from the car via the "Jaws of Life." After a brief examination in the infield care center, Allison was airlifted to Carolinas Medical Center, where he remained for two days because of a broken collarbone and bruises over more than half of his body.

The helicopter buzzed Victory Lane where Allison's team accepted the trophy and $200,000.00 check on his behalf. Allison quipped while lying in his hospital room, "This is the darndest victory lane I've ever been in. I guess the good news is I won $300,000.00, but the bad news is most of that will go towards the hospital bills". Ken Schrader, three consecutive times a runner-up in The Winston, finished third, while Ricky Rudd and Bill Elliott rounded out the top five. Earnhardt's spin relegated him to 14th place.

Race results
Pos	Grid	Car	Driver	Owner	Manufacturer	Laps run	Laps led
1	1	28	Davey Allison	Robert Yates Racing	Ford	70	31
2	16	42	Kyle Petty	Team SABCO	Pontiac	70	26
3	4	25	Ken Schrader	Hendrick Motorsports	Chevrolet	70	0
4	9	5	Ricky Rudd	Hendrick Motorsports	Chevrolet	70	0
5	3	11	Bill Elliott	Junior Johnson & Associates	Ford	70	0
6	2	2	Rusty Wallace	Penske Racing	Pontiac	70	0
7	14	7	Alan Kulwicki	AK Racing	Ford	70	0
8	17	4	Ernie Irvan	Morgan–McClure Motorsports	Chevrolet	70	0
9	15	43	Richard Petty	Petty Enterprises	Pontiac	70	0
10	13	94	Terry Labonte	Hagan Racing	Oldsmobile	70	0
11	6	17	Darrell Waltrip	Darrell Waltrip Motorsports	Chevrolet	70	0
12	7	33	Harry Gant	Leo Jackson Motorsports	Oldsmobile	70	0
13	5	15	Geoff Bodine	Bud Moore Engineering	Ford	70	7
14	8	3	Dale Earnhardt	Richard Childress Racing	Chevrolet	69	6
15	19	30	Michael Waltrip	Bahari Racing	Pontiac	68	0
16	12	9	Dave Mader III	Melling Racing	Ford	66	0
17	18	6	Mark Martin	Roush Racing	Ford	64	0
18	10	18	Dale Jarrett	Joe Gibbs Racing	Chevrolet	11	0
19	11	21	Morgan Shepherd	Wood Brothers Racing	Ford	4	0
20	20	12	Hut Stricklin	Bobby Allison Motorsports	Chevrolet	2	0
