= Tire war =

Competition between tire manufacturers in motorsport

In motorsports, a tire war occurs when more than one manufacturer provides tires for a motorsports series. Historically, tire wars have occurred in many high-level series, such as NASCAR, Formula One, Super GT, and MotoGP.

Tire wars are a controversial practice: on the one hand, they promote technical innovation, forcing tire manufacturers to "push the limits" of their tire manufacture. On the other hand, when all event competitors plan to stretch their tires' performance envelope, the event risks widespread tire failures that can reduce driver safety; such a scenario occurred at the 2005 United States Grand Prix.

== In NASCAR ==
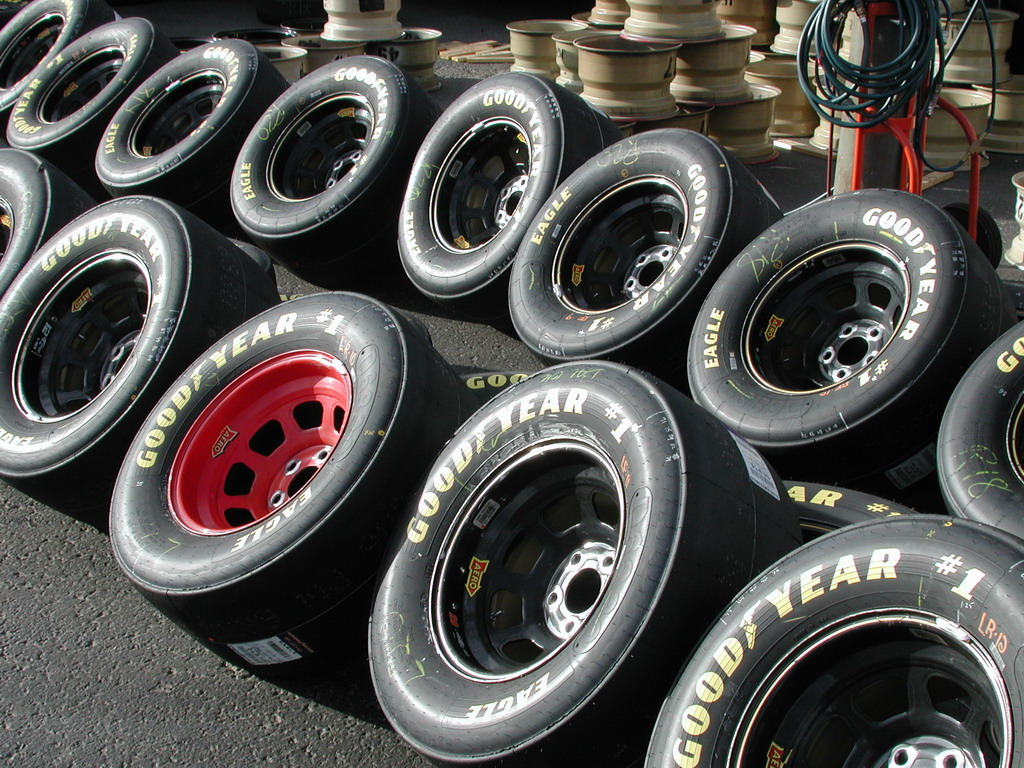
Goodyear has been the official tire supplier of NASCAR since 1954.

=== Early history ===
When NASCAR was founded in 1948, it sourced tires solely from Firestone. In 1954, Goodyear entered the sport. For the next two decades, both tire manufacturers would claim race victories and speed records until Firestone left NASCAR in 1974. In the late 1960s, the deaths of Jimmy Pardue and Billy Wade spurred both Goodyear and Firestone to manufacture the "Inner Liner Safety Spare," also known to NASCAR as "Lifeguard": a second internal envelope to slow a failed tire's deflation and allow drivers to return to the pit. Conversely, controversy erupted at Talladega Superspeedway's 1969 debut race, when drivers experienced tire failures during practice, Firestone withdrew from the race, and Richard Petty led a driver walkout over safety concerns.

In 1978, the McCreary Tire & Rubber Company entered NASCAR. Although J. D. McDuffie won the pole at Dover with McCreary tires, the company never won a race and quickly exited the sport. This left Goodyear as the sole NASCAR tire supplier until Hoosier entered the Busch Grand National Series in 1987.

=== Goodyear vs. Hoosier (1988–1989) ===
In 1986, Goodyear faced a hostile takeover by Sir James Goldsmith. NASCAR feared that the new management might threaten the manufacturer's racing program, and invited Hoosier as a backup plan.

In 1988, Hoosier entered the Winston Cup Series. Hoosier gained an early advantage in the season's second race, at Richmond, where Morgan Shepherd took the pole and Neil Bonnett won the race using Hoosiers. Two weeks later, Bonnett won again at Rockingham.

During the season, NASCAR allowed teams to switch between Goodyear and Hoosier tires. Teams learned that Hoosiers were softer and faster, while Goodyears were more durable and safer. To eliminate Hoosier's competitive advantage, Goodyear began developing a faster tire.

The tire war injured several drivers who crashed following tire failures, most notably during the 1988 Coca-Cola 600. Initial practice suggested that Goodyear's compound was too soft for the track. As a result, all drivers except Dave Marcis switched to Hoosiers over safety concerns, and Goodyear withdrew their tires. Those decisions proved disastrous in the race, when Hoosier tire failures caused crashes that injured Bonnett, Rick Wilson, and Harry Gant. With almost no Goodyear competition, Hoosier's Darrell Waltrip won the race. Despite this setback, Hoosier continued to win; Bill Elliott drove the tires to victory lane at the 1988 Firecracker 400 at Daytona.

That July dealt Goodyear a second major blow, when NASCAR disqualified Goodyear from the Pocono race for over-wide treads. For the first time since the 1956 Southern 500, Goodyear missed a NASCAR race. Three weeks later, Hoosier was disqualified from the Watkins Glen race for the same infraction.

The tire war intensified at Dover when several cars suffered from tire failures. Alan Kulwicki, one of the victims, commented:

Not only did it cost us our chance for a win or a good finish in this race, but we wrecked a race car in the process. It's not like this is the second week in a row it's been happening; it's been happening all year long. Really, a little bit disappointed that the tire companies can't get this solved by now. That people are still crashing cars like this, you know. Fortunately, the cars are pretty safe and no one got hurt.

At the end of the 1988 season, Hoosier had won nine of the 29 races.

In 1989, Goodyear planned to roll out its new radial tires at the Daytona 500. Ideally, the race would definitively prove radial tires' superiority to Hoosier's bias-plys. But Dale Earnhardt and Elliott experienced tire failures during practice, breaking Elliott's wrist, and Goodyear withdrew the radial tires from Daytona. This setback gave Hoosier a major head start, with Waltrip driving on Hoosiers to claim his sole Daytona 500 win. Hoosier dominated the first four races of the season, up to Rusty Wallace's win at the 1989 Pontiac Excitement 400 at Richmond.

But that would prove the manufacturer's final win of the season: Goodyear's radial tires made their debut at the 1989 First Union 400 at North Wilkesboro. While Wallace won the pole on Hoosiers, the lead cars had lapped him by lap 70, and Goodyear's tires' durability proved key to Earnhardt's eventual victory. That loss proved a death blow for Hoosier, who could not sell enough tires to remain viable and left NASCAR after the 1989 Winston 500 at Talladega.

=== Goodyear vs. Hoosier II (1994) ===
Hoosier returned to the Busch Grand National Series in 1991.

Three days after the end of the 1993 season, Hoosier announced their return to the Winston Cup Series in 1994 with radial tires. The company's return was marred by the deaths of Bonnett and Dash Series champion Rodney Orr (who had purchased a Cup car instead of a second-tier car because of the impending change in the Dash Series' engine formula) in separate crashes during practice for the 1994 Daytona 500. Both drivers had used Hoosiers, and the media quickly blamed the company for their deaths. In response, Hoosier released all concerned drivers from their contracts and encouraged them to switch to Goodyear, and NASCAR began allowing drivers to switch tire brands within the first 40 laps of the race.

An independent investigation by the Orlando Sentinel revealed that the Hoosiers met all safety regulations, and the problem was to a common practice at Daytona and Talladega. To reduce drag at the two superspeedways, teams used extremely soft shock absorbers and springs, which caused the mounting brackets to fail as they made contact with the chassis as the cars bottom out. In Orr's situation, a defective right-rear shock absorber mounting bracket had caused Orr's crash. Spectators theorized that bracket failure had also caused Bonnett's death, though no official cause of his crash was announced. Drivers complained about ride quality at the two superspeedways because of the extremely soft shock absorbers, springs, and the related damage to mounting brackets, leading to a 2000 rule change to NASCAR-supplied specification shock absorbers and springs to stop this dangerous practice.

Hoosier claimed 12 poles in the 1994 season, including Rick Mast at the inaugural Brickyard 400. Geoff Bodine won four races with Hoosier, including the Winston Select. But like the 1988 season, both tire manufacturers saw catastrophic failures on their products. Ernie Irvan suffered near-fatal head, chest, and lung injuries in a practice crash at Michigan after one of his Goodyears blew and sent him colliding with the turn two wall. Bodine and Loy Allen Jr. experienced horrifying crashes at the season-ending Atlanta race due to failing Hoosiers. Mark Martin, who won the Atlanta race, blasted the tire war, saying:

We need one tire company. Then we would have the tire at each track that we need. I'm really proud I lived to talk about the '94 tire war. It's not worth it man.

The day after the end of the 1994 season, Hoosier left NASCAR for good, citing high production costs, stiff competition, and little driver support. This ended the NASCAR tire wars.

=== Aftermath ===
Hoosier became a supplier to a development series, the ARCA Racing Series in 1995, which they and their successor company Continental AG (which acquired Hoosier in 2016 after being their distributor) continue to this day. For 2016, the tires were rebranded with Continental AG's General Tire brand.

In April 1997, Goodyear officially became the exclusive tire supplier of NASCAR; this deal was subsequently extended until 2022, which theoretically would prevent another tire war. But in late 2006, when Goodyear workers went on strike, NASCAR once again approached Hoosier and proposed a backup plan for the 2007 season. That plan fell through after the strike ended.

Currently, Goodyear, Continental and Pirelli are official NASCAR tire suppliers, depending on series. Goodyear supplies the three national series (Cup, O'Reilly, and Truck). Continental supplies NASCAR's regional touring series with two brands: General Tire with the ARCA Racing Series (Menards Series, Sioux Chief Showdown, East, and West, the Canada Series, and Mexico Series, and Hoosier with the Whelen Modified Tour and Euro series. Most NASCAR Local Racing Series tracks contract with Continental for tires produced at their Plymouth, Indiana plant. Pirelli supplies the tires for NASCAR Brasil Sprint Race, which became an officially sanctioned NASCAR international series starting from the 2023 season.

== In Formula One ==
Between the 1950s to the early 1990s, Formula One tire brands, such as Dunlop, Firestone, Continental, Goodyear, Avon Rubber, Englebert, Pirelli, and Michelin often warred with each other. From 1961 to 1963 the sport used Dunlop tires exclusively, and in 1987 and 1988 Goodyear took the same role during Pirelli's two-year sabbatical.

In 1992, following Pirelli's exit, Goodyear became the sole Formula One tire supplier for four years. In 1997, Bridgestone entered the sport, but Goodyear would leave the sport following the 1998 season. That left Bridgestone as the sole tire provider until Michelin entered the sport in 2001, sparking a tire war that lasted until 2006. The tire wars during this period have been cited as a reason for the six-car start at the 2005 United States Grand Prix.

After Michelin left at the end of 2006, Bridgestone became the sole tire supplier of Formula One until 2010, when Pirelli took over the duty as Formula One's sole tire supplier, a status it maintains as of 2026.

== In other series ==
Between 2002 and 2008, Bridgestone, Dunlop (until 2007), and Michelin were engaged in a fierce tire war in MotoGP. During this period, there are cases where a team would run with different tire brands for each rider, as in the case with Pons Racing in 2004 and Yamaha Factory Racing in 2008. For 2009, FIM switched to a sole tire supplier, initially Bridgestone. Michelin replaced Bridgestone in 2015, with Pirelli set to take over in 2027.

As of 2021, the Japanese Super GT series features four tire manufacturers competing, although Michelin left the GT500 class following the 2023 season. Super GT will switch to a single tire manufacturer in 2027; later announced to be Bridgestone in GT500 class and Dunlop in GT300. The Nürburgring Langstrecken-Serie also features multiple tire manufacturers. American open-wheel car racing has also seen tire wars, typically between Firestone (currently the sole tire supplier in IndyCar Series) and Goodyear.
