= 1993 The Winston =

Ninth iteration of the NASCAR All-Star Race

Race details
- Race 2 of 2 exhibition races in the 1993 NASCAR Winston Cup Series
- Date: May 22, 1993
- Location: Concord, North Carolina
- Course: Charlotte Motor Speedway
- Course length: 1.5 miles (2.4 km)
- Distance: 70 laps, 105 mi (169 km)
- Weather: Temperatures around 58.8 °F (14.9 °C), with winds gusting to 10.01 miles per hour (16.11 km/h)
- Average speed: 132.678 mph (213.525 km/h)

Pole position
Driver	Ernie Irvan	Morgan–McClure Motorsports

Most laps led
Driver	Ernie Irvan	Morgan–McClure Motorsports
- Laps: 30

Winner
No. 3	Dale Earnhardt	Richard Childress Racing

Television in the United States
- Network: TNN
- Announcers: Mike Joy, Neil Bonnett, and Buddy Baker

The 1993 edition of The Winston was a stock car racing competition that took place on May 22, 1993. Held at Charlotte Motor Speedway in Concord, North Carolina, the 70-lap race was an exhibition race in the 1993 NASCAR Winston Cup Series. Ernie Irvan of Morgan–McClure Motorsports won the pole and led the most laps, but it was Dale Earnhardt of Richard Childress Racing who won the race and became the first three-time All-Star Race winner. This was also the final appearance of Davey Allison at The Winston, as he died from injuries sustained in a helicopter crash on July 13, 1993.

== Background ==
Charlotte Motor Speedway, the track where the race was held.

The Winston was open to winning drivers and team owners from last season through the Save Mart Supermarkets 300K at Sears Point Raceway and all previous All-Star race winners and past NASCAR Winston Cup champions who had attempted to qualify for every race in 1993. The top five finishers of The Winston Open advanced to complete the starting grid.

Alan Kulwicki, who was the defending 1992 NASCAR Winston Cup Series champion, was killed in a plane crash in Blountville, Tennessee on April 1, 1993. Jimmy Hensley substituted for him in this race.

=== 1993 The Winston drivers and eligibility ===
==== Race winners in 1992 and 1993 ====
- 2-Rusty Wallace (5 wins from 1992 and 1993)
- 3-Dale Earnhardt (2 wins from 1992 and 1993)
- 4-Ernie Irvan (3 wins in 1992)
- 5-Ricky Rudd (1 win in 1992)
- 6-Mark Martin (2 wins in 1992)
- 11-Bill Elliott (5 wins in 1992)
- 15-Geoff Bodine (3 wins from 1992 and 1993)
- 17-Darrell Waltrip (3 wins in 1992)
- 18-Dale Jarrett (1 win in 1993, including the 1993 Daytona 500)
- 21-Morgan Shepherd (1 win in 1993)
- 28-Davey Allison (6 wins from 1992 and 1993, including the 1992 Daytona 500)
- 33-Harry Gant (2 wins in 1992)
- 42-Kyle Petty (2 wins in 1992)

==== Winning team owners in 1992 and 1993 ====
- 7-AK Racing with new driver Jimmy Hensley (2 wins in 1992 with Alan Kulwicki)

==== Previous NASCAR Winston Cup Champions ====
- 14-Terry Labonte (1984 NASCAR Winston Cup Series Champion)

==== Top five finishers of The Winston Open ====
- 1-Rick Mast (finished fifth)
- 8-Sterling Marlin (finished first)
- 25-Ken Schrader (finished second)
- 26-Brett Bodine (finished third)
- 30-Michael Waltrip (finished fourth)

== Race summary ==
=== Segment 1 ===
Ernie Irvan won the pole for the all-star event with a lap time of 137.835 mph (221.824 km/h). Sterling Marlin, Ken Schrader, Brett Bodine, Michael Waltrip, and Rick Mast transferred from The Winston Open to make the field. Mark Martin and Geoff Bodine served as the onboard camera cars throughout the race. At the drop of the green flag, Dale Earnhardt and Rusty Wallace battled for second place while Geoff Bodine charged hard from 10th to fifth place in two laps and Dale Jarrett dropped from seventh to 20th. Irvan crossed the finish line to win the caution-free Segment 1 and the US$50,000 bonus while Martin, who started 14th, finished second.

Segment results

1. 4-Ernie Irvan ($50,000)
2. 6-Mark Martin ($15,000)
3. 2-Rusty Wallace ($7,500)

=== Segment 2 ===
During the 10-minute break between segments, the fan balloting on whether or not to invert the field for the second 30-lap segment was unveiled. The fans had spoken and the result flashed on the Winston Cup scoreboard — INVERT!

Kyle Petty, who was supposed to lead the field after finishing last on Segment 1, retired before the restart due to catastrophic valve issues; as a result, Morgan Shepherd assumed the point. On lap 31, Michael Waltrip spun and hit the turn 2 outside wall after contact with Harry Gant; in the midst of the chaos, Jimmy Hensley scraped the No. 30 while Jarrett lost control, hit Marlin on the right side, and collided with Hensley before hitting the outside wall head-on. After a seven-lap caution, Mast took the lead from Shepherd on lap 40. Earnhardt then overtook Shepherd for second while drivers from the back of the field aggressively charged towards the front. Ricky Rudd took his car to the garage on lap 43 as a result of engine failure. Mast kept the lead away from Earnhardt until the end of Segment 2 to collect the US$50,000 bonus.

Segment results

1. 1-Rick Mast ($50,000)
2. 3-Dale Earnhardt ($15,000)
3. 6-Mark Martin ($7,500)

=== Segment 3 ===
For the final 10-lap shootout, Mast lost momentum at the drop of the green flag while Martin rushed from the inside line to lead for eight laps while Earnhardt and Irvan closed in on Martin before Terry Labonte lost his engine and spun towards the turn 4 outside wall before colliding with Bill Elliott to trigger the caution on lap 69. Caution flags do not count in the final segment, setting up a two-lap dash. The restart was aborted after Earnhardt jumped the gun before the line, prompting another yellow flag. On the final restart, Earnhardt took the lead from Martin and took the checkered flag to win the US$200,000 bonus and his third All-Star Race.

Race results
Pos	Grid	Car	Driver	Owner	Manufacturer	Laps run	Laps led
1	3	3	Dale Earnhardt	Richard Childress Racing	Chevrolet	70	2
2	14	6	Mark Martin	Roush Racing	Ford	70	8
3	1	4	Ernie Irvan	Morgan–McClure Motorsports	Chevrolet	70	30
4	17	25	Ken Schrader	Hendrick Motorsports	Chevrolet	70	0
5	10	15	Geoff Bodine	Bud Moore Engineering	Ford	70	0
6	8	17	Darrell Waltrip	Darrell Waltrip Motorsports	Chevrolet	70	0
7	16	8	Sterling Marlin	Stavola Brothers Racing	Ford	70	0
8	2	2	Rusty Wallace	Penske Racing	Pontiac	70	0
9	5	28	Davey Allison	Robert Yates Racing	Ford	70	0
10	18	26	Brett Bodine	King Racing	Ford	70	0
11	20	1	Rick Mast	Precision Products Racing	Ford	70	21
12	9	21	Morgan Shepherd	Wood Brothers Racing	Ford	70	9
13	12	33	Harry Gant	Leo Jackson Motorsports	Chevrolet	70	0
14	4	11	Bill Elliott	Junior Johnson & Associates	Ford	70	0
15	13	14	Terry Labonte	Hagan Racing	Chevrolet	68	0
16	11	5	Ricky Rudd	Hendrick Motorsports	Chevrolet	43	0
17	15	7	Jimmy Hensley	AK Racing	Ford	32	0
18	19	30	Michael Waltrip	Bahari Racing	Pontiac	31	0
19	7	18	Dale Jarrett	Joe Gibbs Racing	Chevrolet	31	0
20	6	42	Kyle Petty	Team SABCO	Pontiac	30	0
