= Mark Garrow =

Catholic priest

Mark Garrow (April 2, 1955 - October 19, 2007) was an American Catholic priest who served as Prior General of the Congregation of Marian Fathers.

Garrow was ordained a priest on December 29, 1984. He later served as a novice master, a local superior, a general councilor and a general prefect of formation.

Garrow died of cancer in 2007.
