= American Sports Cavalcade =

American motorsports television program

- Genre: Sports anthology series
- Presented by: Ed Bruce (1983–1985)
- Theme music composer: Craig S. Najjar
- Country of origin: United States

Production
- Running time: Varied
- Production company: Diamond P Sports

Original release
- Network: The Nashville Network
- Release: 1983 – 1995

American Sports Cavalcade is an American motorsports television show produced by Diamond P Sports in Hollywood, California that aired on The Nashville Network (TNN) from 1983 to 1995. American Sports Cavalcade was a winner of the cable television ACE Award for their motorsports coverage.

== Format ==
The first contracted season of the show produced 26 installments (episodes). At the opening of each episode, a narrator (usually Dave McClelland) would say, "Diamond P Sports presents... the American Sports Cavalcade. A panorama of speed, color, drama, and excitement!" Over the years, American Sports Cavalcade televised such sports as NASCAR and ASA stock car racing, NHRA drag racing, CART Indycar racing, GATR Truck racing, IMSA and SCCA sports car racing, AMA supercross and superbike racing, USAC and World of Outlaws sprint car racing, monster truck racing and truck and tractor pulling from TNT Motorsports, APBA offshore power boat racing, Swamp Buggy racing from Naples, Florida, and even a couple of rodeo events during their first few seasons.

This show usually aired during racing season on Saturdays and once or twice on Sundays, with the same episode airing each time during that weekend. The episodes were almost always taped, edited, and broadcast a week or two after the event had taken place (known in broadcasting as tape delay). The episodes were usually 90 minutes in length.

In the mid-1980s, Diamond P and TNN were the first group to televise racing from Road America in Elkhart Lake, Wisconsin.

== Personnel ==
The show was originally hosted by singer-songwriter and actor Ed Bruce, along with expert commentary by Steve Evans and Brock Yates. Executive producer Harvey M. Palash and producer/director John B. Mullin oversaw the show. Bruce was himself a high school football and baseball player and for a time held a Sports Car Club of America competition racing license. Bruce eventually left Cavalcade to host a different TNN program called Truckin' USA. Throughout the years, Cavalcade would employ other announcers as well, including Paul Page, Gary Gerould, Ralph Sheheen, and "Big Daddy" Don Garlits for NHRA telecasts.

Production company Diamond P Sports and Opryland Productions (parent entity of TNN) had cooperated on numerous programs since 1975.

== Highlight VHS ==
In 1989, Diamond P Sports and TNN collaborated and released a video entitled And They Walked Away. This VHS video featured a compilation of footage from the first six years of American Sports Cavalcade, and it featured a plethora of auto racing and motor sports accidents, crashes, and fires. As the title states, no fatal accidents were included in this production. Seven additional videos were later released in the series, the last three under the And They Walked Away Extreme banner, with its last release in 1997, all of them featuring crash footage from TNN motorsports coverage, accompanied with driver interviews after each accident.
