= 1996 The Winston Select =

12th iteration of the NASCAR All-Star Race

Race details
- Race 2 of 2 exhibition races in the 1996 NASCAR Winston Cup Series
- Date: May 18, 1996
- Location: Concord, North Carolina
- Course: Charlotte Motor Speedway
- Course length: 1.5 miles (2.4 km)
- Distance: 70 laps, 105 mi (169 km)
- Weather: Temperatures around 78.5 °F (25.8 °C), with winds gusting to 8 miles per hour (13 km/h)
- Average speed: 162.721 mph (261.874 km/h)

Pole position
| Driver | Jeff Gordon | Hendrick Motorsports |

Most laps led
| Driver | Terry Labonte | Hendrick Motorsports |
- Laps: 22

Winner
| No. 21 | Michael Waltrip | Wood Brothers Racing |

Television in the United States
- Network: TNN
- Announcers: Eli Gold, Buddy Baker, and Dick Berggren

The 1996 edition of The Winston Select was a stock car racing competition that took place on May 18, 1996. Held at Charlotte Motor Speedway in Concord, North Carolina, the 70-lap race was an exhibition race in the 1996 NASCAR Winston Cup Series. Jeff Gordon of Hendrick Motorsports won the pole. Terry Labonte of Hendrick Motorsports led the most laps with 22 of the 70 laps. Michael Waltrip of Wood Brothers Racing became the first transferee to win the Winston Select after qualifying in the Winston Select Open.

== Background ==
Charlotte Motor Speedway, the track where the race was held.

The Winston was open to winning drivers and team owners from last season through the 1996 Winston Select 500 at Talladega Superspeedway and all previous All-Star race winners and NASCAR Winston Cup champions who had attempted to qualify for every race in 1996 were eligible to compete in the All-Star Race. In addition, the top five finishers of The Winston Select Open qualified for this race.

Bill Elliott suffered a broken femur in a crash during the Winston Select 500. Harry Gant, who had retired in 1994, substituted for Elliott for this race.

=== 1996 The Winston Select drivers and eligibility ===
==== Race winners in 1995 and 1996 ====
- 2-Rusty Wallace (4 wins from 1995 and 1996)
- 3-Dale Earnhardt (7 wins from 1995 and 1996)
- 4-Sterling Marlin (4 wins from 1995 and 1996, including the 1995 Daytona 500)
- 5-Terry Labonte (4 wins from 1995 and 1996)
- 6-Mark Martin (4 wins in 1995)
- 10-Ricky Rudd (1 win in 1995)
- 18-Bobby Labonte (3 wins in 1995)
- 22-Ward Burton (1 win in 1995)
- 24-Jeff Gordon (10 wins from 1995 and 1996)
- 42-Kyle Petty (1 win in 1995)
- 88-Dale Jarrett (2 wins from 1995 and 1996, including the 1996 Daytona 500)

==== Winning team owners in 1995 and 1996 ====
- 28-Robert Yates Racing with new driver Ernie Irvan (1 win in 1995 with Dale Jarrett)

==== Previous winners of The Winston Select ====
- 7-Geoff Bodine (1994 The Winston Select winner)

==== Previous NASCAR Winston Cup Champions ====
- 17-Darrell Waltrip (3-time NASCAR Winston Cup Series Champion)
- 94-Bill Elliott (1988 NASCAR Winston Cup Series Champion)

==== Top five finishers of The Winston Select Open ====
- 8-Hut Stricklin (finished third)
- 9-Lake Speed (finished second)
- 21-Michael Waltrip (finished fifth)
- 23-Jimmy Spencer (finished first)
- 99-Jeff Burton (finished fourth)

== Race summary ==
=== Segment 1 ===
Jeff Gordon won the pole for the all-star event with a lap time of 142.001 mph (228.528 km/h). Gordon, Dale Earnhardt, Mark Martin, and Michael Waltrip served as onboard camera cars throughout the race. Just as the green flag dropped, Jeff Burton limped back to the garage area when his engine expired. As Earnhardt and Dale Jarrett battled for second place, Terry Labonte lost momentum and slid out of the top 10 while Ward Burton charged within the top five. On lap 12, Jarrett took the lead from Gordon and led Bobby Labonte and Ward Burton on lap 30 to win the caution-free Segment 1 and collect the $50,000 bonus.

Segment results

1. 88-Dale Jarrett ($50,000)
2. 18-Bobby Labonte ($15,000)
3. 22-Ward Burton ($7,500)

=== Segment 2 ===
During the 10-minute break between segments, the fan balloting on whether or not to invert the field for the second 30-lap segment was unveiled. The fans had spoken and the result flashed on the Winston Cup scoreboard — INVERT!

Jarrett was sent to the rear of the field, while Harry Gant and Darrell Waltrip assumed the front row. By lap 32, Terry Labonte overtook Gant and held the lead until lap 53. On lap 36, Ward Burton got loose and crashed on the turn four wall, triggering the first caution in the race. Earnhardt took the lead from Terry Labonte by lap 54 and won Segment 2 to collect his $50,000 bonus. Terry Labonte crossed the line second and Rusty Wallace finished third. Meanwhile, Michael Waltrip, who started the race 20th, finished fourth.

Segment results

1. 3-Dale Earnhardt ($50,000)
2. 5-Terry Labonte ($15,000)
3. 2-Rusty Wallace ($7,500)

=== Segment 3 ===
For the final 10-lap shootout, Earnhardt led the field, but the caution flag waved after Wallace, Bobby Labonte, and Jarrett jumped the restart. The green flag finally dropped with Earnhardt and Terry Labonte battling for the lead. As they both made contact on lap 62, Michael Waltrip blasted past them while Wallace took the second spot away from Earnhardt and Martin overtook Terry Labonte for fourth. With over a one second lead over Wallace, Michael Waltrip took the Wood Brothers Racing No. 21 Ford Thunderbird to Victory Lane, earning the team $211,000. Following the race, he took home roughly $100,000 and used it to build half of a house for his parents.

Being winless at the time, this victory was a huge achievement for Michael Waltrip. He would not win his first points race in the NASCAR Cup Series until the 2001 Daytona 500.

Race results
| Pos | Grid | Car | Driver | Owner | Manufacturer | Laps run | Laps led |
|---|---|---|---|---|---|---|---|
| 1 | 20 | 21 | Michael Waltrip | Wood Brothers Racing | Ford | 70 | 9 |
| 2 | 15 | 2 | Rusty Wallace | Penske Racing South | Ford | 70 | 0 |
| 3 | 2 | 3 | Dale Earnhardt | Richard Childress Racing | Chevrolet | 70 | 8 |
| 4 | 3 | 6 | Mark Martin | Roush Racing | Ford | 70 | 0 |
| 5 | 7 | 5 | Terry Labonte | Hendrick Motorsports | Chevrolet | 70 | 22 |
| 6 | 8 | 10 | Ricky Rudd | Rudd Performance Motorsports | Ford | 70 | 0 |
| 7 | 13 | 28 | Ernie Irvan | Robert Yates Racing | Ford | 70 | 0 |
| 8 | 1 | 24 | Jeff Gordon | Hendrick Motorsports | Chevrolet | 70 | 11 |
| 9 | 4 | 88 | Dale Jarrett | Robert Yates Racing | Ford | 70 | 19 |
| 10 | 5 | 4 | Sterling Marlin | Morgan–McClure Motorsports | Chevrolet | 70 | 0 |
| 11 | 10 | 42 | Kyle Petty | Team SABCO | Pontiac | 70 | 0 |
| 12 | 17 | 9 | Lake Speed | Melling Racing | Ford | 70 | 0 |
| 13 | 12 | 18 | Bobby Labonte | Joe Gibbs Racing | Chevrolet | 70 | 0 |
| 14 | 16 | 23 | Jimmy Spencer | Travis Carter Enterprises | Ford | 70 | 0 |
| 15 | 14 | 94 | Harry Gant | Bill Elliott Racing | Ford | 70 | 1 |
| 16 | 18 | 8 | Hut Stricklin | Stavola Brothers Racing | Ford | 70 | 0 |
| 17 | 11 | 7 | Geoff Bodine | Geoff Bodine Racing | Ford | 70 | 0 |
| 18 | 9 | 17 | Darrell Waltrip | Darrell Waltrip Motorsports | Chevrolet | 70 | 0 |
| 19 | 6 | 22 | Ward Burton | Bill Davis Racing | Pontiac | 36 | 0 |
| 20 | 19 | 99 | Jeff Burton | Roush Racing | Ford | 0 | 0 |
