= 1994 The Winston Select =

Ninth iteration of the NASCAR All-Star Race

Race details
- Race 2 of 2 exhibition races in the 1994 NASCAR Winston Cup Series
- Date: May 21, 1994
- Location: Concord, North Carolina
- Course: Charlotte Motor Speedway
- Course length: 1.5 miles (2.4 km)
- Distance: 70 laps, 105 mi (169 km)
- Weather: Temperatures around 59.4 °F (15.2 °C), with winds gusting to 20.83 miles per hour (33.52 km/h)
- Average speed: 132.678 mph (213.525 km/h)

Pole position
Driver	Rusty Wallace	Penske Racing South

Most laps led
Driver	Ernie Irvan	Robert Yates Racing
- Laps: 24

Winner
No. 7	Geoff Bodine	Geoff Bodine Racing

Television in the United States
- Network: TNN
- Announcers: Mike Joy and Buddy Baker

The 1994 edition of The Winston Select was a stock car racing competition that took place on May 21, 1994. Held at Charlotte Motor Speedway in Concord, North Carolina, the 70-lap race was an exhibition race in the 1994 NASCAR Winston Cup Series. Rusty Wallace of Penske Racing South won the pole, while Ernie Irvan of Robert Yates Racing led the most laps, but it was Geoff Bodine of Geoff Bodine Racing who won the race.

== Background ==
Charlotte Motor Speedway, the track where the race was held.

The Winston Select was open to winning drivers and team owners from last season through the Save Mart Supermarkets 300 at Sears Point Raceway and all previous All-Star race winners and past NASCAR Winston Cup champions who had attempted to qualify for every race in 1994. The top six finishers of The Winston Select Open advanced to complete the starting grid of 20 cars.

The 1994 season saw the second of two tire wars between Goodyear and Hoosier.

The earnings for The Winston Select were as follows:

The Winston Select earnings
Total purse	US$1,081,000
Qualifying pole winner	US$50,000
Segment 1 & 2 winner(s)	US$50,000
Segment 3 winner	US$200,000
The Winston Select Open winner	US$28,000

=== 1994 The Winston drivers and eligibility ===
==== Race winners in 1993 and 1994 ====
- 2-Rusty Wallace (12 wins from 1993 and 1994)
- 3-Dale Earnhardt (9 wins from 1993 and 1994)
- 4-Sterling Marlin (1 win in 1994, including the 1994 Daytona 500)
- 5-Terry Labonte (1 win in 1994)
- 6-Mark Martin (5 wins in 1993)
- 7-Geoff Bodine (1 win in 1993)
- 10-Ricky Rudd (1 win in 1993)
- 18-Dale Jarrett (1 win in 1993, including the 1993 Daytona 500)
- 21-Morgan Shepherd (1 win in 1993)
- 28-Ernie Irvan (4 wins from 1993 and 1994)
- 42-Kyle Petty (1 win in 1993)

==== Winning team owners in 1993 and 1994 ====
- 15-Bud Moore Engineering with new driver Lake Speed (1 win in 1993 with Geoff Bodine)

==== Previous NASCAR Winston Cup Champions ====
- 11-Bill Elliott (1988 NASCAR Winston Cup Series Champion)
- 17-Darrell Waltrip (3-time NASCAR Winston Cup Series Champion)

==== Top six finishers of The Winston Open ====
- 8-Jeff Burton (finished fourth)
- 24-Jeff Gordon (finished first)
- 25-Ken Schrader (finished third)
- 31-Ward Burton (finished fifth)
- 41-Joe Nemechek (finished sixth)
- 77-Greg Sacks (finished second)

== Race summary ==
=== Segment 1 ===
Rusty Wallace won the pole for the all-star event to collect the US$50,000 bonus. Jeff Gordon, Greg Sacks, Ken Schrader, Jeff Burton, Ward Burton, and Joe Nemechek transferred from The Winston Select Open to make the field. Mark Martin, Geoff Bodine, and Lake Speed served as the onboard camera cars throughout the race. At the drop of the green flag, Wallace led the field until the yellow flag waved on lap 4 when Speed blew a right-front tire and scraped the turn 3 outside wall after bumping Morgan Shepherd. When the race resumed on lap 7, Ernie Irvan took the lead from Wallace and kept it until the second yellow flag waved on lap 14 when Bodine spun on the frontstretch after contact with Marlin. Irvan retained the lead at the restart and crossed the finish line to win Segment 1 and the US$50,000 bonus while Marlin and Dale Jarrett completed the top-three.

Segment results

1. 28-Ernie Irvan ($50,000)
2. 4-Sterling Marlin ($15,000)
3. 18-Dale Jarrett ($7,500)

=== Segment 2 ===
During the 10-minute break between segments, the fan balloting on whether or not to invert the field for the second 30-lap segment was unveiled. The fans had spoken and the result flashed on the Winston Cup scoreboard — INVERT!

During the warmup lap, Speed, who was supposed to lead the field, surrendered it to Sacks and moved to the back of the field due to handling issues. At the drop of the green flag, Sacks led the field for 13 laps. On lap 36, Terry Labonte retired from the race due to transmission issues. Schrader took the lead from Sacks on lap 44, but the yellow flag waved when Ward Burton spun on the frontstretch after contact with Dale Earnhardt. When the race resumed on lap 49, Sacks resumed the lead, but on lap 50, a multi-car accident on turn 4 involving Wallace, Earnhardt, Marlin, and Gordon triggered the caution; Wallace and Earnhardt's night was over. The race restarted on lap 54 with Bodine taking the lead, but the yellow flag waved again on lap 56 when Martin and Sacks collided and hit the turn 1 wall hard while Jarrett spun beneath the white line. The green flag waved on lap 58 for a two-lap shootout, with Bodine outgunning Irvan to win Segment 2 and collect the US$50,000 bonus. In an attempt to take the lead from Bodine on the frontstretch, Irvan ran over the infield grass and spun before crashing on the outside wall, ending his chances to win the final segment.

Segment results

1. 7-Geoff Bodine ($50,000)
2. 28-Ernie Irvan ($15,000)
3. 25-Ken Schrader ($7,500)

=== Segment 3 ===
For the final 10-lap shootout, Schrader outgunned Bodine to lead for four laps before alternating with Marlin between laps 65 and 67. On lap 68, Bodine retook the lead from Schrader and took the checkered flag to win the US$200,000 bonus while Marlin beat Schrader for second place. Bodine turned the car around to do a Polish victory lap in memory of Alan Kulwicki, who was killed in a plane crash on April 1, 1993, and whose team was purchased by Bodine at the end of the 1993 season.

Race results
Pos	Grid	Car	Driver	Owner	Manufacturer	Laps run	Laps led
1	4	7	Geoff Bodine	Geoff Bodine Racing	Ford	70	10
2	14	4	Sterling Marlin	Morgan–McClure Motorsports	Chevrolet	70	2
3	17	25	Ken Schrader	Hendrick Motorsports	Chevrolet	70	10
4	13	17	Darrell Waltrip	Darrell Waltrip Motorsports	Chevrolet	70	0
5	6	10	Ricky Rudd	Rudd Performance Motorsports	Ford	70	0
6	18	8	Jeff Burton	Stavola Brothers Racing	Chevrolet	70	0
7	3	18	Dale Jarrett	Joe Gibbs Racing	Chevrolet	70	0
8	8	21	Morgan Shepherd	Wood Brothers Racing	Ford	70	0
9	19	31	Ward Burton	A.G. Dillard Motorsports	Chevrolet	70	0
10	20	41	Joe Nemechek	Larry Hedrick Motorsports	Chevrolet	70	0
11	9	42	Kyle Petty	Team SABCO	Pontiac	70	0
12	7	11	Bill Elliott	Junior Johnson & Associates	Ford	70	0
13	10	15	Lake Speed	Bud Moore Engineering	Ford	70	0
14	15	24	Jeff Gordon	Hendrick Motorsports	Chevrolet	70	0
15	2	28	Ernie Irvan	Robert Yates Racing	Ford	60	24
16	12	6	Mark Martin	Roush Racing	Ford	55	0
17	16	77	Greg Sacks	U.S. Motorsports Inc.	Ford	54	18
18	11	3	Dale Earnhardt	Richard Childress Racing	Chevrolet	49	0
8	1	2	Rusty Wallace	Penske Racing South	Ford	49	6
20	5	5	Terry Labonte	Hendrick Motorsports	Chevrolet	36	0
