= Steve Evans (broadcaster) =

American motorsports broadcaster

- Born: January 13, 1942; Mission Viejo, California, U.S.
- Died: November 1, 2000 (aged 58); Las Vegas, Nevada, U.S.
- Occupation: Sports Announcer

Steve Evans (January 13, 1942 – November 1, 2000) was an American motorsports broadcaster with a career that spanned four decades.

== Early life and career ==
Evans started announcing drag races at age 19 at the fabled San Gabriel and Fontana tracks in California and later managed all three of Southern California's famed tracks, which included Lions Dragstrip, Orange County Int'l Raceway, and Irwindale Raceway. He began announcing national events in 1966 and a year later he went to work full time as editor of National Dragster, and later as public relations director for NHRA. Evans worked on NHRA's syndicated TV shows for more than two decades and covered NHRA drag racing on TNN, ABC, and NBC. He was also the host of the weekly television newsmagazine NHRA Today, which aired over 500 shows between 1990 and 1998. During his tenure with TNN, Evans also covered other motorsports events, such as NASCAR and World of Outlaws sprint car racing and Monster Trucks.

Evans also frequently voiced local radio commercials promoting upcoming drag racing events in the Southern California area, which were collected onto the commercial cassette release Be There, which was later rereleased on CD.

== Death ==
After missing a production meeting in advance of calling the World of Outlaws race at Las Vegas Motor Speedway, Evans died in his sleep in a Las Vegas hotel room on November 1, 2000 from a heart attack. He was 58.
