= Rick Benjamin (announcer) =

American motorsports announcer

Rick Benjamin (born October 22, 1952, in Danbury, Connecticut) is a motorsports journalist. He was Speed Channel's voice of the USAR Hooters Pro Cup Series, and was the voice of Champ Car racing for HDNet from 2004 until the end of the final season of Champ Car in 2007.

Benjamin was a local news reporter from 1976 until 1996, being a television anchorman and managing editor for markets as diverse as Knoxville, Tennessee (where his youngest son's birth was announced on-air); KSAT-TV in San Antonio, Texas; the Nebraska Television Network in Kearney, Nebraska; KWQC in the Quad Cities of Iowa and Illinois; Toledo, Ohio; and Roanoke, Virginia. He was also the news director for Waterbury, CT's WATR.

Benjamin also did work for Mizlou Television Network for their NASCAR coverage, and for SportsChannel in 1990 when they aired Busch Grand National races, using the pseudonym Ron Williams.

When The Nashville Network bought 50% of Ken Squier and Fred Rheinstein's World Sports Enterprises, and shifted production of TNN's popular RaceDay from Patterson International to the network's own in-house operation, located inside the industrial park of Lowe's Motor Speedway, Benjamin was named anchor of the network's RaceDay in 1995, anchoring the show until MTV shut down the entire CBS Charlotte operation in November 2000.

Benjamin is responsible for the "rebranding" of CART into Champ Cars, as during the CART-IRL dispute, Benjamin began using the term "Champ Car," an old term used in USAC during the Marlboro Championship Trail, to refer to the CART formula in 1997, on RaceDay after the rival Indy Racing League switched to a normally aspirated formula. The show used the term, which CART began using in 1998 after Federal Express took over sponsorship of the series from PPG Industries, and the new "Champ Car" term was a reference to the FedEx Championship Series. Since 2004, he has been the lead announcer for the series, which has gone out on Spike TV, CBS, NBC, Speed Channel & in 2007 returning to the networks of ESPN & ABC for the first time since 2001.

Benjamin was one of the first on-air personalities at Speed when it was launched as SpeedVision in 1996. He is a former SpeedNews anchor.

Benjamin is also frequently a backup news anchor at Charlotte radio station WBT, where he has some duties with the Carolina Panthers pre and post game shows, and has used his experience in the news media to form Visioncast, where his group teaches drivers, crewmen, and corporate representatives to face the media.

Benjamin formerly co-hosted Tradin' Paint with Danny "Chocolate" Myers on Sirius Satellite Radio's NASCAR channel 90. He was succeeded by Jim Noble.

Benjamin also appeared in the movie Talladega Nights: The Ballad of Ricky Bobby, starring Will Ferrell.
