= NASCAR on television and radio =

Media rights

The television and radio rights to broadcast NASCAR are among the most expensive broadcast rights of any American sport, with the current television contract with Amazon Prime Video, CW Sports, Fox Sports, NBC/USA Sports and TNT Sports being worth around US$8 billion.

In the early days of NASCAR, sports programs like CBS Sports Spectacular and ABC Wide World of Sports would air video highlight packages of the races. These packages were typically 15 to 30 minutes long and were cut from film of the entire race, similar to video packages created by NFL Films. For major races like the Daytona 500, ABC Sports would show footage live for a certain number of laps at the beginning, then show the end of the race. A few races were shown in their entirety in the 1970s, but these were always recorded and shown days or weeks later.

In 1979, CBS Sports televised the 1979 Daytona 500 live from start to finish. With the introduction of ESPN in 1981, more races began being shown live in their entirety. Since 1992, all NASCAR races have been shown from start to finish, and all have been shown live since 1997. Until 2001, race tracks struck individual agreements with networks to broadcast races, but in order to capitalize on the growing popularity of the sport NASCAR announced in 1999 that television contracts would now be centralized; that is, instead of making agreements with individual tracks, networks would now negotiate directly with NASCAR for the rights to air a package of races.

== Television ==
=== English language broadcast networks (over-the-air) ===
==== Current ====
- Fox: 2001–present
- NBC: 1964, 1979–1985, 1999–2006, 2015–present (Cup Series only since 2025)
- The CW: 2024–present (O'Reilly Series)

==== Former ====
- CBS: 1960, 1964, 1975–2000
- ABC: 1961–1992, 1994–2000, 2007–2014

=== Spanish language networks ===
- Fox Deportes: 2013–present
- Telemundo: 2015–present
- Universo: 2015–present

=== English language cable/satellite networks ===
==== Current ====
- FS1: 2013–present
- FS2: 2015–present
- Fox Business Network: 2016–present (primarily used as a backup should another sporting event run past its scheduled ending or for breaking news coverage on the main FOX network)
- CNBC: 2006, 2015–present (primarily used as a backup should another sporting event run past its scheduled ending or for breaking news coverage on the main NBC network)
- USA Network: 1982–1985, 2016, 2022–present (Cup Series only since 2025)
- TNT: 2001–2014, 2025–present (Cup Series only 2007-2014 and 2025-present)
- TruTV: 2025–present (Cup Series practice and qualifying only)

==== Former ====
- CNN/SI: 2001
- ESPN: 1981–2002, 2007–2014
- ESPN2: 1995–2002, 2007–2014
- ESPN Classic: 2007–2010
- ESPNEWS: 2011–2014
- ESPN Deportes: 2013–2014
- FNN-SCORE: 1988
- Fox Sports Net: 2001
- FX: 2001–2006
- HDNet: 2005–2008
- Prime: 1990–1992
- Speed: 1998–1999, 2003–2013
- SportsChannel America: 1990
- TBS: 1983–2000
- TNN: 1983, 1986, 1991–2000
- Versus/NBCSN: 2010, 2015–2021
- Viewer's Choice: 1988–1990
- Jefferson-Pilot: 1985–1987
- Mizlou: 1982–1985
- MRN TV: 1979–1980
- SETN: 1984–1988

=== English language streaming services ===
- Peacock: 2021–present (Cup Series only)
- HBO Max: 2025–present (Cup Series only)
- Amazon Prime: 2025–present (Cup Series only)
- ESPN (streaming service): 2026–present (Simulcasts of the O'Reilly Auto Parts Series races)
- FloRacing: 2022-present (ARCA Menards Series, ARCA Menards Series East, ARCA Menards Series West, Whelen Modified Tour, Advance Auto Parts Weekly Racing Series)

=== Early years ===
One of the earliest telecasts of a NASCAR race was the 1960 Daytona 500, parts of which was presented as part of CBS Sports Spectacular, with announcer Bud Palmer.

Between that broadcast and 1979, there were three main sources of NASCAR telecasts:

- ABC's Wide World of Sports, the sports anthology program, provided coverage of select NASCAR Winston Cup races in the 1970s. In 1971, it presented a 200-lap race at Greenville-Pickens Speedway in its entirety, the first such broadcast of a NASCAR race. Throughout the 1970s, ABC presented portions of the Daytona 500, Southern 500, and other important races.
- In the late 1970s, CBS Sports Spectacular aired some races; like Wide World of Sports, they were taped and edited.
- Car and Track, a weekly auto racing show hosted by Bud Lindemann, recapped all of NASCAR's top-series races in the 1960s and 1970s in a weekly 30-minute syndicated show.

The following table is a list of races from NASCAR's top three series that have been broadcast partially or in their entirety on television during the 1960s.

Race Number	Race Date	Race title	Race Track	Series	Network	Lap-by-Lap Commentator	Analysts	Pit Reporters	Notes
2 of 44	February 12, 1960	100 Mile Qualifying Races	Daytona International Speedway	NASCAR Grand National Division	CBS	Bud Palmer			First ever NASCAR broadcast.
3 of 44	February 12, 1960	100 Mile Qualifying Races	Daytona International Speedway	NASCAR Grand National Division	CBS	Bud Palmer			First ever NASCAR broadcast.

Year	Networks	Lap-by-lap	Color commentator(s)
1969	ABC	Bill Flemming; Jim McKay	Chris Economaki
1968	ABC	Bill Flemming	Chris Economaki
1967	ABC	Jim McKay; Bill Flemming	Chris Economaki; Fred Lorenzen
1966	ABC	Curt Gowdy; Jim McKay; Bill Flemming	Rodger Ward; Chris Economaki
1965	ABC	Bill Flemming; Jim McKay	Dan Gurney; Chris Economaki; Rodger Ward
1964	ABC	Bill Flemming; Jim McKay	Chris Economaki
1963	ABC	Bill Flemming	Chris Economaki
1962	ABC	Jim McKay; Bill Flemming	Stirling Moss; Chris Economaki
1961	ABC	Bill Flemming	Chris Economaki
1960	CBS	Bud Palmer	

=== 1970s ===
Year	Networks	Lap-by-lap	Color commentator(s)
1979	ABC	Jim McKay; Al Michaels; Bill Flemming	Jackie Stewart; Sam Posey
1979	CBS	Ken Squier	David Hobbs; Lee Petty; Brock Yates
1978	ABC	Jim McKay; Al Michaels	Chris Economaki; Jackie Stewart
1978	CBS	Ken Squier	David Hobbs
1977	ABC	Jim McKay; Keith Jackson; Al Michaels	Jackie Stewart; Chris Economaki
1977	CBS	Ken Squier	David Hobbs
1976	ABC	Bill Flemming	Jackie Stewart
1976	CBS	Ken Squier	Richard Petty; Lee Petty; Bobby Unser; Ned Jarrett
1975	ABC	Bill Flemming	Jackie Stewart
1975	CBS	Ken Squier	Johnny Rutherford
1974	ABC	Keith Jackson; Bill Flemming	Jackie Stewart; Chris Economaki
1973	ABC	Jim McKay; Keith Jackson; Bill Flemming	Jackie Stewart; Chris Economaki
1972	ABC	Keith Jackson; Bill Flemming	Chris Economaki; Donnie Allison
1971	ABC	Keith Jackson; Bill Flemming; Jim McKay	Chris Economaki
1970	ABC	Bill Flemming; Keith Jackson; Jim McKay	Chris Economaki; Ned Jarrett

=== 1979–2000: Flag-to-flag coverage ===
CBS Sports President Neal Pilson and motor-sports editor Ken Squier believed that Americans would watch an entire stock car race live on television. On February 18, 1979, CBS presented the first flag-to-flag coverage of the Daytona 500. Richard Petty won NASCAR's crown-jewel race for the sixth time, but more attention was drawn by the post-race fight on the track's infield between Cale Yarborough and Donnie Allison, who crashed together on the final lap while leading. The race drew incredible ratings, in part due to the compelling action both on and off the track, and in part because a major snowstorm on the East Coast kept millions of viewers indoors.

As time passed, more Winston Cup races ended up on TV. ESPN broadcast its first race in 1981, from North Carolina Motor Speedway (its first live race was later in the year at Atlanta International Raceway), and TNN followed in 1991. All Cup races were nationally televised by 1985; networks struck individual deals with track owners, and multiple channels carried racing content. Many races were shown taped and edited on Wide World of Sports and syndication services like Mizlou and SETN, but almost all races were live by 1989. By 2000, the last year of this arrangement, six networks televised at least one Cup series race: CBS, ABC, ESPN, TNN, TBS, and NBC.

At the same time, a growing number of races in the Busch Grand National Series and NASCAR Truck Series were made available for broadcast, and some track owners even included support races in lesser series. Likewise, Winston Cup qualifying rounds aired on ESPN2 or regional sports network Prime Network.

NASCAR sought to capitalize on its increased popularity even more, so they decided that future deals would be centralized; that is, the networks would negotiate directly with NASCAR for a regular schedule of telecasts.

==== 1980s ====
Year	Networks	Lap-by-lap	Color commentator(s)
1989	ABC	Paul Page	Bobby Unser; Sam Posey; Benny Parsons
1989	CBS	Ken Squier	Ned Jarrett; Chris Economaki
1989	ESPN	Bob Jenkins	Ned Jarrett; Benny Parsons
1989	TBS	Ken Squier	Johnny Hayes; Phil Parsons; Joe Ruttman
1989	PPV	Dave Despain	Lyn St. James; Gary Nelson
1988	ABC	Keith Jackson; Paul Page	Jerry Punch; Johnny Rutherford
1988	CBS	Ken Squier	Ned Jarrett; Chris Economaki
1988	ESPN	Bob Jenkins; Jerry Punch	Ned Jarrett; Gary Nelson
1988	TBS	Ken Squier	Johnny Hayes
1988	FNN/Score	Pat Patterson	Bob Latford
1987	ABC	Jim Lampley; Keith Jackson	Sam Posey; Donnie Allison
1987	CBS	Ken Squier	Ned Jarrett; David Hobbs
1987	ESPN	Bob Jenkins; Larry Nuber	Larry Nuber; Jerry Punch
1987	TBS	Ken Squier	Lake Speed; Johnny Hayes; Buddy Baker
1987	SETN	Eli Gold	Jerry Punch
1986	ABC	Jim Lampley	Sam Posey
1986	CBS	Ken Squier	Ned Jarrett; David Hobbs; Neil Bonnett
1986	ESPN	Bob Jenkins	Larry Nuber; Jack Arute; Benny Parsons; Rick Mears
1986	Mizlou	Steve Grad	Dick Brooks
1986	TBS	Ken Squier	Benny Parsons; Phil Parsons
1986	TNN	Steve Evans	Brock Yates
1986	SETN	Mike Joy; Eli Gold	Jerry Punch
1985	ABC	Al Trautwig	Sam Posey
1985	CBS	Ken Squier	David Hobbs; Ned Jarrett
1985	ESPN	Bob Jenkins; Larry Nuber	Benny Parsons; Larry Nuber; Jack Arute
1985	Mizlou	Mike Hogewood	Dick Brooks
1985	TBS	Ken Squier	Benny Parsons
1985	TNN	Steve Evans	Brock Yates
1985	SETN	Mike Joy	Benny Parsons
1985	Jefferson Pilot	Mike Joy	Neil Bonnett; Kyle Petty
1984	ABC	Jim Lampley	Sam Posey
1984	CBS	Ken Squier	Ned Jarrett; David Hobbs; Benny Parsons
1984	ESPN	Bob Jenkins	Larry Nuber; Jack Arute
1984	Mizlou	Mike Joy	Phil Parsons; Donnie Allison
1984	TBS	Ken Squier	Glenn Jarrett; Phil Parsons
1984	Mizlou	Mike Joy	Phil Parsons
1984	USA	Ken Squier	David Hobbs
1984	SETN	Mike Joy	Benny Parsons
1983	ABC	Bill Flemming	Sam Posey
1983	CBS	Ken Squier	David Hobbs; Ned Jarrett
1983	NBC	Paul Page	Johnny Rutherford
1983	ESPN	Bob Jenkins	Larry Nuber
1983	Mizlou	Ken Squier	Phil Parsons; Buddy Baker; Donnie Allison
1983	TBS	Ken Squier	Cale Yarborough; Geoff Bodine
1983	TNN	Brock Yates	Steve Evans
1982	ABC	Al Michaels	Sam Posey; Jackie Stewart
1982	CBS	Ken Squier	David Hobbs
1982	ESPN	Bob Jenkins	Larry Nuber
1982	Mizlou	Rick Benjamin	Dick Brooks; Buddy Baker
1982	USA	Ken Squier	David Hobbs
1981	ABC	Keith Jackson; Bill Flemming	Jackie Stewart
1981	CBS	Ken Squier	Dale Earnhardt; David Hobbs; Ned Jarrett
1981	NBC	Paul Page	Gary Gerould
1981	ESPN	Bob Jenkins; Dave Despain; Mike Joy	Eli Gold; Larry Nuber
1980	ABC	Al Michaels; Jim McKay; Chris Economaki; Jim Lampley	Jackie Stewart; Sam Posey; Jackie Stewart
1980	CBS	Ken Squier	David Hobbs
1980	NBC	Paul Page	

==== 1990s ====
Year	Networks	Lap-by-lap	Color commentator(s)
1999	ABC	Bob Jenkins	Benny Parsons; Ned Jarrett
1999	CBS	Mike Joy	Ned Jarrett; Darrell Waltrip; Buddy Baker
1999	ESPN	Bob Jenkins	Ned Jarrett; Benny Parsons
1999	TBS	Ken Squier; Allen Bestwick	Buddy Baker; Dick Berggren
1999	TNN	Eli Gold	Buddy Baker; Dick Berggren
1999	NBC	Allen Bestwick	Joe Gibbs; Mike Wallace
1998	ABC	Bob Jenkins	Benny Parsons
1998	CBS	Mike Joy	Ned Jarrett; Buddy Baker
1998	ESPN	Bob Jenkins	Benny Parsons; Kyle Petty; Ned Jarrett
1998	TBS	Ken Squier	Buddy Baker; Dick Berggren
1998	TNN	Eli Gold	Buddy Baker; Dick Berggren
1997	ABC	Bob Jenkins	Benny Parsons; Ned Jarrett
1997	CBS	Ken Squier	Ned Jarrett; Buddy Baker
1997	ESPN	Bob Jenkins	Ned Jarrett; Benny Parsons
1997	TBS	Ken Squier	Buddy Baker; Dick Berggren; Greg Sacks
1997	TNN	Eli Gold	Buddy Baker; Dick Berggren
1996	ABC	Bob Jenkins	Benny Parsons; Danny Sullivan
1996	CBS	Ken Squier	Ned Jarrett; Buddy Baker
1996	ESPN	Bob Jenkins	Ned Jarrett; Benny Parsons
1996	TBS	Ken Squier	Buddy Baker; Dick Berggren
1996	TNN	Eli Gold	Buddy Baker; Dick Berggren
1995	ABC	Bob Jenkins	Benny Parsons
1995	CBS	Ken Squier	Ned Jarrett; Darrell Waltrip; Richard Petty
1995	ESPN	Bob Jenkins	Ned Jarrett; Benny Parsons
1995	TBS	Ken Squier	Ernie Irvan; Chuck Bown; Richard Petty; Chad Little
1995	TNN	Mike Joy	Buddy Baker; Dick Berggren
1994	ABC	Bob Jenkins	Benny Parsons
1994	CBS	Ken Squier	Ned Jarrett; Chris Economaki
1994	ESPN	Bob Jenkins	Ned Jarrett; Benny Parsons; Dorsey Schroeder
1994	TBS	Ken Squier	Dave Marcis; Kenny Wallace; Richard Petty; Barry Dodson; Chuck Bown; Cale Yarborough
1994	TNN	Mike Joy	Glenn Jarrett; Buddy Baker; Kenny Wallace
1993	CBS	Ken Squier	Ned Jarrett; Neil Bonnett
1993	ESPN	Bob Jenkins	Ned Jarrett; Benny Parsons
1993	TBS	Ken Squier	Neil Bonnett
1993	TNN	Mike Joy	Buddy Baker; Neil Bonnett
1992	ABC	Paul Page	Benny Parsons; Bobby Unser
1992	CBS	Ken Squier	Ned Jarrett; Neil Bonnett; Chris Economaki
1992	ESPN	Bob Jenkins	Benny Parsons; Ned Jarrett
1992	TBS	Ken Squier	Neil Bonnett
1992	TNN	Mike Joy	Neil Bonnett; Buddy Baker
1991	ABC	Paul Page	Benny Parsons; Bobby Unser
1991	CBS	Ken Squier	David Hobbs; Ned Jarrett
1991	ESPN	Bob Jenkins	Benny Parsons; Ned Jarrett
1991	TBS	Ken Squier	Neil Bonnett; Ken Stabler
1991	TNN	Mike Joy	Buddy Baker; Neil Bonnett; Phil Parsons
1990	ABC	Paul Page	Benny Parsons; Bobby Unser
1990	CBS	Ken Squier	Chris Economaki; Ned Jarrett; David Hobbs
1990	ESPN	Bob Jenkins	Benny Parsons; Ned Jarrett
1990	TBS	Ken Squier	Neil Bonnett; Lyn St. James; Johnny Hayes; Chris Economaki
1990	PPV	Dave Despain	Lyn St. James; Benny Parsons

=== 2001–2006: Fox, NBC, Turner Sports ===
On December 15, 1999 Fox Sports, FX, NBC and Turner Sports agreed to pay $2.4 billion for a new six-year television package, covering the Winston/Nextel Cup Series and Busch Series schedules.

- Fox and FX would be responsible for covering the first half of the season. All Busch Series races during that part of the season would also be on Fox/FX. NBC and Turner would partner to cover the second half of the season, which beginning in 2004 would include the Chase for the Cup. Originally, Turner's broadcast outlet for its NASCAR coverage was to be TBS as it had been for every other race Turner had broadcast before. However, Turner Broadcasting rebranded its sister network TNT as a drama-heavy network and decided to move the NASCAR coverage there in March 2001, as they felt it fit the new branding better.
- As part of the new contract, the Daytona events were split evenly between the networks. Fox would air the Daytona 500 in every odd-numbered year during the contract, with NBC covering the then-Pepsi 400 those years. NBC would then, in turn, air the Daytona 500 in every even-numbered year, with Fox covering the Pepsi 400.
- The network in charge of Daytona 500 coverage would also have the rights to air the events during Speedweeks, which consisted of the Budweiser Shootout, Daytona 500 pole qualifying, the two qualifying races held after pole qualifying, and the season opening Busch race.

ESPN retained the rights to the Truck Series through 2002 under a separate contract. Beginning in 2003, Speed Channel bought out the rest of ESPN's contract and became the exclusive broadcast home of that series.

Initially, practice and qualifying sessions would alternate between Fox Sports Net and FX during the Fox/FX portion of the season, and between TNT and CNNSI during the NBC/TNT portion of the season. By the end of 2002, Speed had replaced Fox Sports Net and (due to CNN/SI shutting down in the spring of 2002) a deal was arranged with NBC/TNT to move most practice and qualifying sessions to Speed, as well using NBC/TNT's production team and Speed graphics.

Year	Networks	Lap-by-lap	Color commentator(s)
2009	Fox	Mike Joy	Darrell Waltrip; Larry McReynolds
2009	TNT	Bill Weber; Ralph Sheheen	Wally Dallenbach; Kyle Petty
2009	ESPN	Jerry Punch	Dale Jarrett; Andy Petree
2009	ABC	Jerry Punch	Dale Jarrett; Andy Petree
2009	SPEED	Mike Joy	Darrell Waltrip; Larry McReynolds
2008	Fox	Mike Joy	Darrell Waltrip; Larry McReynolds
2008	TNT	Bill Weber	Wally Dallenbach; Kyle Petty
2008	ESPN	Jerry Punch	Dale Jarrett; Andy Petree
2008	ABC	Jerry Punch	Rusty Wallace; Andy Petree
2008	SPEED	Mike Joy	Darrell Waltrip; Larry McReynolds
2007	Fox	Mike Joy	Darrell Waltrip; Larry McReynolds
2007	TNT	Bill Weber	Wally Dallenbach; Kyle Petty
2007	ESPN	Jerry Punch	Rusty Wallace; Andy Petree
2007	ABC	Jerry Punch	Rusty Wallace; Andy Petree
2007	SPEED	Mike Joy	Darrell Waltrip; Larry McReynolds
2006	Fox	Mike Joy	Darrell Waltrip; Larry McReynolds
2006	FX	Mike Joy	Darrell Waltrip; Larry McReynolds
2006	NBC	Bill Weber	Wally Dallenbach; Benny Parsons
2006	TNT	Bill Weber	Wally Dallenbach; Benny Parsons
2005	Fox	Mike Joy	Darrell Waltrip; Larry McReynolds
2005	FX	Mike Joy	Darrell Waltrip; Larry McReynolds
2005	NBC	Bill Weber	Wally Dallenbach; Benny Parsons
2005	TNT	Bill Weber; Allen Bestwick	Wally Dallenbach; Benny Parsons
2004	Fox	Mike Joy	Darrell Waltrip; Larry McReynolds
2004	FX	Mike Joy	Darrell Waltrip; Larry McReynolds
2004	NBC	Allen Bestwick	Wally Dallenbach; Benny Parsons
2004	TNT	Allen Bestwick	Wally Dallenbach; Benny Parsons
2003	Fox	Mike Joy	Darrell Waltrip; Larry McReynolds
2003	FX	Mike Joy	Darrell Waltrip; Larry McReynolds
2003	NBC	Allen Bestwick	Wally Dallenbach; Benny Parsons
2003	TNT	Allen Bestwick	Wally Dallenbach; Benny Parsons
2002	Fox	Mike Joy	Darrell Waltrip; Larry McReynolds
2002	FX	Mike Joy	Darrell Waltrip; Larry McReynolds
2002	NBC	Allen Bestwick	Wally Dallenbach; Benny Parsons
2002	TNT	Allen Bestwick	Wally Dallenbach; Benny Parsons
2001	Fox	Mike Joy	Darrell Waltrip; Larry McReynolds
2001	FX	Mike Joy	Darrell Waltrip; Larry McReynolds
2001	NBC	Allen Bestwick	Wally Dallenbach; Benny Parsons
2001	TNT	Allen Bestwick	Wally Dallenbach; Benny Parsons
2000	ABC	Bob Jenkins	Benny Parsons; Ray Evernham
2000	CBS	Mike Joy	Ned Jarrett; Buddy Baker
2000	ESPN	Bob Jenkins; Jerry Punch	Ned Jarrett; Benny Parsons
2000	TBS	Allen Bestwick	Buddy Baker; Dick Berggren
2000	TNN	Eli Gold	Buddy Baker; Dick Berggren

=== 2007–2014: Fox, ESPN, Turner Sports ===
Late in 2005, NBC announced that they no longer wanted to carry NASCAR races on their schedule. ABC/ESPN took the opportunity to regain the series. On December 12, 2005, NASCAR announced its next TV contract: eight years at $4.8 billion with Fox/Speed Channel, ABC/ESPN, and TNT. This time, the deal bundled the Truck Series alongside the Sprint Cup and Nationwide series:

- Fox broadcast the first 13 Cup races along with the Busch Clash every year, and as a result gained exclusivity for the Daytona 500. The package ran through the first weekend in June and (usually) the race at Dover International Speedway. Due to schedule adjustments, the package ended in 2010 with the Coca-Cola 600 and in 2011 with the spring Kansas race.
- TNT, which split from former partner NBC, gained rights to six races including the Coke Zero 400 at Daytona. Their coverage began with the June race at Pocono Raceway and continued with the first race of the year at Michigan International Speedway, the lone race at Sonoma Raceway, the Coke Zero 400, and the first race of the year at New Hampshire Motor Speedway. Originally, TNT's sixth and final race was the race at Chicagoland Speedway, but this was moved to later in the season when TNT picked up the race at Kentucky Speedway. The Coke Zero 400 was presented with limited commercial interruptions until 2013. The Kentucky race replaced the race at Chicagoland Speedway in 2011.
- ESPN networks broadcast the remainder of the Cup schedule, beginning at the Brickyard 400. From 2007 to 2009, ABC carried coverage of the last race before the Chase at Richmond and all Chase for the Sprint Cup events. In 2010, following NASCAR's shift to standardized start times for races, only three races were aired on ABC, and the majority of coverage was allotted to ESPN networks.
- ESPN networks held exclusive rights to the Nationwide Series across the entire season, with races on ESPN, ESPN2, and ABC.
- Speed Channel moved two of its Truck Series races to Fox from 2007 to 2009. From 2010 to 2013, all CWTS races were on Speed; Fox returned to the series in 2014 with its telecast of the Talladega race.
- Qualifying sessions for Sprint Cup races aired on Fox for the Daytona 500, on Speed/FS1 for the next 18 races, and alternating between Speed/FS1 and ESPN/ESPN2 for the remaining 17 races.
- NASCAR Cup Series practice sessions were broadcast by Speed/FS1 for the first 19 races and alternated between Speed/FS1 and ESPN2 for the remaining 17 races. Speed/FS1 was guaranteed at least one session each weekend during the ESPN portion of the schedule.
- Nationwide Series practice and qualifying alternated between Speed/FS1 and ESPN2 throughout the entire season.
- On the pay-per-view front, DirecTV premiered NASCAR Hot Pass at the 2007 Daytona 500. The package consists of four channels, each dedicated to a particular driver with team communications among the driver, crew chief, and spotter. From 2007 to 2008, Hot Pass also had separate lap-by-lap announcers and color commentators for each channel. In 2009 NASCAR Hot Pass became free, although without announcers, and on January 7, 2013, it was discontinued all together. NBC and FX no longer carried NASCAR as a result.

Starting in 2006, NBC was paying $2.8 billion for six years of Sunday night telecasts of the National Football League. The new NFL and old NASCAR deals overlapped in 2006, which forced some postrace coverage at NBC races to air on CNBC. FX stopped airing sporting events from 2006 to 2010. (It did show the ninth inning of a rain-delayed Fox game between the New York Yankees and the Boston Red Sox when it conflicted with the start of the 2008 Subway Fresh Fit 500, as well as other games which overran into the starts of NASCAR races. Beginning in 2010, Fox's MLB games during NASCAR Saturdays were shifted to early in the afternoon.)

The new contracts increased the amount of coverage from each weekend's races. When the 2007 season began, all practices for NASCAR Cup Series races were televised, whereas only the final practice ("happy hour") had been televised before. In addition, all Nationwide Series final practices and qualifying sessions were shown; before, a few qualifying sessions were not seen and only a handful of practices were seen. Most, if not all, truck series time trials are also broadcast.

From 2007 to 2010, average race viewership fell from 7.85 million at its height to 5.99 million, according to the Sports Business Journal.

Starting in 2013, Spanish-language network Fox Deportes has aired select NASCAR Cup races either live or delayed.

In August 2013, Speed was replaced by Fox Sports 1, and Fuel TV by Fox Sports 2. All Truck Series races remained on Fox Sports 1, while practice and qualifying sessions and regional series races alternated between Fox Sports 1 and 2 depending on scheduling. For North American markets outside of the United States, coverage of some NASCAR events carried by Speed at the time remained on an international version of Speed (now Fox Sports Racing) that operates in the regions.

In 2014, the Sprint Unlimited moved to Fox Sports 1. Owing to the increased viewership of qualifying sessions under the new "group" knockout format, and being the first restrictor plate race under the new system, qualifying coverage for that year's Aaron's 499 was moved to Fox, marking the only other race besides the Daytona 500 to have a qualifying round televised on broadcast television.

==== 2010s ====
Year	Networks	Lap-by-lap	Color commentator(s)
2019	Fox	Mike Joy	Darrell Waltrip; Jeff Gordon
2019	NBC	Rick Allen	Jeff Burton; Dale Earnhardt Jr. Steve Letarte
2019	NBCSN	Rick Allen	Jeff Burton; Dale Earnhardt Jr. Steve Letarte
2019	FS1	Mike Joy	Darrell Waltrip; Jeff Gordon
2018	Fox	Mike Joy	Darrell Waltrip; Jeff Gordon
2018	NBC	Rick Allen	Jeff Burton; Dale Earnhardt Jr. Steve Letarte
2018	NBCSN	Rick Allen	Jeff Burton; Dale Earnhardt Jr. Steve Letarte
2018	FS1	Mike Joy	Darrell Waltrip; Jeff Gordon
2017	Fox	Mike Joy	Darrell Waltrip; Jeff Gordon
2017	NBC	Rick Allen	Jeff Burton; Steve Letarte
2017	NBCSN	Rick Allen; Leigh Diffey	Jeff Burton; Steve Letarte
2017	FS1	Mike Joy	Darrell Waltrip; Jeff Gordon
2016	Fox	Mike Joy	Darrell Waltrip; Jeff Gordon
2016	NBC	Rick Allen	Jeff Burton; Steve Letarte
2016	NBCSN	Rick Allen	Jeff Burton; Steve Letarte
2016	FS1	Mike Joy	Darrell Waltrip; Jeff Gordon
2016	USA	Rick Allen	Jeff Burton; Steve Letarte
2015	Fox	Mike Joy	Darrell Waltrip; Larry McReynolds
2015	NBC	Rick Allen	Jeff Burton; Steve Letarte
2015	NBCSN	Rick Allen	Jeff Burton; Steve Letarte
2015	FS1	Mike Joy	Darrell Waltrip; Larry McReynolds
2015	Fox	Mike Joy	Darrell Waltrip; Larry McReynolds
2015	NBC	Rick Allen	Jeff Burton; Steve Letarte
2015	NBCSN	Rick Allen	Jeff Burton; Steve Letarte
2015	FS1	Mike Joy	Darrell Waltrip; Larry McReynolds
2014	Fox	Mike Joy	Darrell Waltrip; Larry McReynolds
2014	TNT	Adam Alexander	Wally Dallenbach; Kyle Petty
2014	ESPN	Allen Bestwick	Dale Jarrett; Andy Petree
2014	ABC	Allen Bestwick	Dale Jarrett; Andy Petree
2014	FS1	Mike Joy	Darrell Waltrip; Larry McReynolds
2013	Fox	Mike Joy	Darrell Waltrip; Larry McReynolds
2013	TNT	Adam Alexander	Wally Dallenbach; Kyle Petty
2013	ESPN	Allen Bestwick	Dale Jarrett; Andy Petree
2013	ABC	Allen Bestwick	Dale Jarrett; Andy Petree
2013	SPEED	Mike Joy	Darrell Waltrip; Larry McReynolds
2012	Fox	Mike Joy	Darrell Waltrip; Larry McReynolds
2012	TNT	Adam Alexander	Wally Dallenbach; Kyle Petty
2012	ESPN	Allen Bestwick	Dale Jarrett; Andy Petree
2012	ABC	Allen Bestwick	Dale Jarrett; Andy Petree
2012	SPEED	Mike Joy	Darrell Waltrip; Michael Waltrip
2011	Fox	Mike Joy	Darrell Waltrip; Larry McReynolds
2011	TNT	Adam Alexander	Wally Dallenbach; Kyle Petty
2011	ESPN	Allen Bestwick	Dale Jarrett; Andy Petree
2011	ABC	Allen Bestwick	Dale Jarrett; Andy Petree
2011	SPEED	Mike Joy	Darrell Waltrip; Michael Waltrip
2010	Fox	Mike Joy	Darrell Waltrip; Larry McReynolds
2010	TNT	Adam Alexander	Wally Dallenbach; Kyle Petty
2010	ESPN	Marty Reid	Dale Jarrett; Andy Petree
2010	ABC	Marty Reid	Dale Jarrett; Andy Petree
2010	SPEED	Mike Joy	Darrell Waltrip; Larry McReynolds

==== Broadcasters ====
The broadcast teams for each package during this period are as follows:

- Fox retained most of the same announcers that worked for the network since 2001: Mike Joy, Larry McReynolds, and Darrell Waltrip in the booth, pit reporters Steve Byrnes, Dick Berggren, and Matt Yocum; and prerace hosts Chris Myers and Jeff Hammond. Krista Voda replaced Jeanne Zelasko as the fourth pit reporter; with the expansion of Fox's baseball coverage to a full season, Zelasko was no longer available due to her responsibilities as then-studio host.
- The ESPN/ABC team: the original team consisted of Jerry Punch as the lead, with Rusty Wallace and Andy Petree as booth analysts. Allen Bestwick moved over from NBC/TNT as the lead pit reporter, joined by fellow former NBC/TNT pit reporter Dave Burns, ESPN's then-lead NASCAR reporter Mike Massaro, and IndyCar pit reporter Jamie Little. Punch was eventually replaced by Marty Reid as the lead and Dale Jarrett replaced Wallace as an analyst. Bestwick and Wallace were moved to serve as studio host and analyst for NASCAR Countdown, while Punch moved back into his familiar role as lead pit reporter. Bestwick was later promoted to replace Reid as the lead broadcaster.
- TNT kept Bill Weber as lap-by-lap announcer and Wally Dallenbach Jr. as analyst. After some speculation, Kyle Petty was revealed as the second analyst for the network's coverage on February 7, 2007. He continued his role as an active NASCAR driver for two seasons before retiring from driving. Benny Parsons, who was an NBC/TNT analyst, died on January 16, 2007; he had reportedly talked about retirement after 2006 and had personally nominated Petty as his replacement prior to his death. TNT retained its pit crew as well, with Matt Yocum and Marty Snider joined by former secondary pit reporters Ralph Sheheen and Lindsay Czarniak on a permanent basis. McReynolds, a booth analyst for Fox, is the pre-race analyst. Weber also continued as host of the Countdown to Green pre-race show. Marc Fein joined McReynolds on a new "pre-pre-race" show called NASCAR on TNT Live.

Bill Weber was forced to leave TNT shortly before the 4th race of TNT's schedule. Officially, Turner says it was due to a personal matter; however USA Today reported that it was due to an incident at a hotel the night before the race. Ralph Sheheen stepped in as announcer for the last 3 races on TNT in 2009. Adam Alexander filled in on pit road for the last 2 races, before moving to the announcer booth for 2010 and beyond. Sheheen returned to pit road, where he remained until the end of TNT's contract. The NASCAR on TNT Live show was discontinued and morphed into an hour-long Countdown to Green which was hosted by Alexander.

=== 2015–2024: Fox and NBC ===
On October 15, 2012, NASCAR and the Fox Sports Media Group (FSMG) announced a new $2.4 billion eight-year deal, a 30% increase from their previous deal. On July 23, 2013, NASCAR and the NBC Sports Group announced a new $4.4 billion ten-year deal. Ten days later on August 1, 2013, NASCAR and Fox extended and expanded their agreement, paying an additional $1.4 billion to do so, to complete NASCAR's new TV package through the 2024 season. NBC reportedly bid over 50% more than ESPN and Turner for their portion of the package, despite Turner and ESPN expressing interest in continuing their relationship with NASCAR.

==== 2020s ====
Year	Networks	Lap-by-lap	Color commentator(s)
2025	Fox	Mike Joy	Clint Bowyer; Kevin Harvick
2025	NBC	Leigh Diffey	Jeff Burton; Steve Letarte
2025	USA	Leigh Diffey	Jeff Burton; Steve Letarte
2025	FS1	Mike Joy	Clint Bowyer; Kevin Harvick
2025	Prime Video	Adam Alexander	Dale Earnhardt Jr. Steve Letarte
2025	TNT	Adam Alexander	Dale Earnhardt Jr. Steve Letarte
2024	Fox	Mike Joy	Clint Bowyer; Kevin Harvick
2024	NBC	Rick Allen; Leigh Diffey (Note: Diffey replaced Allen as the main lap-by-lap commentator from the 2024 Coke Zero Sugar 400 onwards.)	Jeff Burton; Steve Letarte
2024	USA	Rick Allen; Leigh Diffey	Jeff Burton; Steve Letarte
2024	FS1	Mike Joy	Clint Bowyer; Kevin Harvick
2023	Fox	Mike Joy	Clint Bowyer; Guest Analysts
2023	NBC	Rick Allen	Jeff Burton; Dale Earnhardt Jr. Steve Letarte
2023	USA	Rick Allen	Jeff Burton; Dale Earnhardt Jr. Steve Letarte
2023	FS1	Mike Joy	Clint Bowyer; Guest Analysts
2022	Fox	Mike Joy	Clint Bowyer; Guest Analysts
2022	NBC	Rick Allen	Jeff Burton; Steve Letarte; Dale Earnhardt Jr.
2022	USA	Rick Allen	Jeff Burton; Steve Letarte; Dale Earnhardt Jr.
2022	FS1	Mike Joy	Clint Bowyer; Guest Analysts
2021	Fox	Mike Joy	Jeff Gordon; Clint Bowyer
2021	NBC	Rick Allen	Jeff Burton; Dale Earnhardt Jr. Steve Letarte
2021	NBCSN	Rick Allen	Jeff Burton; Dale Earnhardt Jr. Steve Letarte
2021	FS1	Mike Joy	Jeff Gordon; Clint Bowyer
2020	Fox	Mike Joy	Jeff Gordon
2020	NBC	Rick Allen	Jeff Burton; Dale Earnhardt Jr. Steve Letarte
2020	NBCSN	Rick Allen	Jeff Burton; Dale Earnhardt Jr. Steve Letarte
2020	FS1	Mike Joy	Jeff Gordon

==== NASCAR Cup Series ====
- The first 16 points races are broadcast by Fox. Ten races, including the Daytona 500, are broadcast on Fox with six races on FS1.
- The final 20 points races, including the NASCAR playoffs, are broadcast by NBC. Nine races are airing on NBC and 11 would air on NBCSN until the end of the 2021 season. NBCSN ceased broadcasting a few weeks later, and their schedule of races would move to USA beginning with the 2022 season.
- As part of the deal, Playoff races airing on NBC are lead-ins to NBC Sunday Night Football (after local news and NBC Nightly News, except for the final race of the season, when SNF follows the race).
- The Busch Clash alternates between Fox (2015–2016, 2022–2024) and FS1 (2014, 2017–2021).
- The Bluegreen Vacations Duel races, now in primetime, and NASCAR All-Star Race air on FS1.
- Practice and qualifying rights belongs to the network group broadcasting the race.
- All races are live-streamed online.

==== NASCAR Xfinity Series ====
- The first 14 races are broadcast by Fox. From 2015 to 2018, four races are broadcast on Fox and the other 10 races air on FS1, but since 2019 all races air on FS1.
- The final 19 races are broadcast by NBC. Four races (five in 2020) are broadcast by NBC and the other 15 races (14 in 2020) would air on NBCSN until the end of the 2021 season. NBCSN ceased broadcasting a few weeks later, and their schedule of races moved to USA beginning with the 2022 season.
- Practice and qualifying rights belong to the network broadcasting the race.
- All races are live-streamed online.

==== Other rights ====
- Fox Sports continues to be the exclusive broadcasters of the NASCAR Truck Series. All Truck races are also streaming on the Fox Sports app.
- USA Network also broadcast the ARCA Menards Series East and West, NASCAR Whelen Modified Tour and NASCAR PEAK Mexico Series.
- Telemundo and Universo have Spanish-language broadcast rights for national series and Toyota (Mexico) Series events.
- Peacock holds rights to the NASCAR Hall of Fame induction ceremony and season ending banquets.

ESPN no longer broadcast NASCAR for the foreseeable future, while TNT no longer broadcast NASCAR until 2025 (see below). The new contract succeeded a partnership with Turner Sports and ESPN which it was paid by $4.8 billion that was covered by the previous contract which was eight years that began in 2007.

=== 2025–2031: Fox, Amazon Prime Video, TNT, USA Sports, NBC and the CW ===
In July 2023, broadcast network The CW signed a TV rights deal to broadcast the NASCAR Xfinity Series from 2025 to 2031 for an estimated $115 million annual fee.

In November 2023, NASCAR announced a television and streaming deal for the NASCAR Cup Series from 2025 to 2031 for a $1.1 billion annual fee. Fox Sports and NBC Sports will distribute 14 Cup races each, with five and four races on their broadcast networks respectively. Fox Sports will continue to air early season spring races including the Daytona 500, while NBC will continue to show late-season fall races including the entire NASCAR Cup Series playoffs. Amazon Prime Video will stream five Cup races in the early summer, as well as practice and qualifying for the first half of the season except for the Clash, Daytona 500 and All-Star Race. TNT will show the remaining five Cup races in the late summer, which will also be streamed on HBO Max. Practice and qualifying for the second half of the season will air on TruTV and HBO Max. It was also announced that Fox Sports would continue its arrangement with the NASCAR Truck Series from the previous media deal. Starting in 2026, Versant, a company formed after a spinoff of most of NBCUniversal's cable channels, will produce NBC and USA Network broadcasts as part of NASCAR on USA Sports, of which NBC will broadcast only 4 races.

=== Historical Race Network Table ===
Below is a table (1960–present) of each NASCAR Cup Series points race and the network upon which it was broadcast:

Note: This table reflects the network upon which each race was predominantly shown, and does not reflect in-race movements, rain delays, and pre-emptions due to time constraints or other commitments, Non-points races from these seasons (Busch Clash, NASCAR All-Star Race and All-Star open, 1988 Goodyear NASCAR 500, NASCAR Thunder Special Suzuka, Coca-Cola 500 (Motegi), and Daytona Duels (even though it has awarded points since 2017)) are also not listed.

Color Codes:	CBS Sports	TNT Sports (TNT, TBS)	ABC	ESPN	TNN	Fox Sports (FOX, FS1)	FX	NBC Sports (NBC, NBCSN, CNBC)	USA	Amazon Prime Video	Other	None

Year	1	2	3	4	5	6	7	8	9	10	11	12	13	14	15	16	17	18	19	20	21	22	23	24	25	26	27	28	29	30	31	32	33	34	35	36	37	38	39	40	41	42	43	44	45	46	47	48	49	50	51	52	53	54	55	56	57	58	59	60	61	62
NASCAR Cup Series Broadcast Networks
Racetrack Individual Agreements with Networks Era (1960-2000)
1960	CLT	COL	DAY; CBS	DAY; CBS	DAY; CBS	CLT	NWS	PHO	COL	MAR	HIK	WIL	WSL	GRN	WEV	DAR	SPR	HIL	RCH	HAN	CLT	WSL	DAY	PIT	MON	MYR	ATL	BIR	NSH	WEV	SPR	COL	SB	WSL	DAR	HIK	SAC	SUM	HIL	MAR	NWS	CLT	RCH	ATL																		
1961	CLT	JAC	DAY	DAY	DAY	SPR	WEV	HAN	ATL	GRN	HIL	WSL	MAR	NWS	COL	HIK	RCH	MAR	DAR	CLT	CLT	RIV	LOS	CLT	SPR	BIR	GRN	WSL	WSL	HRT	ROA	DAY; ABC	ATL	COL	MYR	BR	NSH	WSL	WEV	RCH	SB	DAR	HIK	RCH	SAC	ATL	MAR	NWS	CLT	BRI	GRN	HIL										
1962	CON	WEV	DAY	DAY	DAY; ABC	CON	WEV	SAV	HIL	RCH	COL	NWS	GRN	MYR	MAR	WSL	BR	RCH	HIK	CON	DAR	SPR	CLT	ATL	WSL	AUG	RCH	SB	DAY; ABC	COL	ASH	GRN	AUG	SAV	MYR	BRI	RIN	NSH	HUN	WEV	ROA	NWS	SPR	VAL	DAR; ABC	HIK	RCH	MOY	AUG	MAR	NWS	CLT	ATL									
1963	BIR	GOL	TAH	RIV	DAY	DAY	DAY; ABC	SPR	WEV	HIL	ATL	HIK	BRI	AUG	RCH	GRN	SB	WSL	MAR	NWS	COL	TAH	DAR	MAS	RCH	CLT	BIR	ATL	DAY; ABC	MYR	SAV	MOY	WSL	ASH	OLB	BRI	BR	GRN	NSH	COL	WEV	SPR	NWS	HUN	DAR	HIK	RCH	MAR	MOY	NWS	TAH	CLT	SB	HIL	RIV							
1964	CON	AUG	JAC	SAV	RIV	DAY	DAY	DAY; ABC	RCH	BRI	GRN	WSL	ATL; CBS	WEV	HIL	SPR	COL	NWS	MAR	SAV	DAR	LAN	HIK	SB	CLT; NBC	GRN	ASH	ATL	CON	NSH	RIN	BIR	VAL	SPR	DAY	MAS	OLB	BRI	ISL	GLN	NOX	BRI	NSH	MYR	WEV	MOY	HUN	COL	WSL	ROA	DAR	HIK	RCH	MAS	HIL	MAR	SAV	NWS	CLT; ABC	SAV	AUG	JAC
1965	RIV	DAY	DAY	DAY; ABC	SPR	WEV	RCH	HIL	ATL	GRN	NWS	MAR	COL	BRI	DAR; ABC	LAN	WSL	HIK	CLT	CLE	ASH	HAR	NSH	BRI	ATL	GRN	MYR	VAL	DAY; ABC	MAS	OLB	ISL	GLN	BRI	NSH	CLE	WEV	MAY	SPR	AUG	COL	MOY	BEL	WSL	DAR; ABC	HIK	NOX	MAS	RCH	MAR	NWS	CLT; ABC	HIL	CAR	MOY							
1966	AUG	RIV	DAY	DAY	DAY; ABC	CAR	BRI	ATL	HIK	COL	GRN	WSL	NWS	MAR	DAR; ABC	LAN	MAC	STR	RCH	CLT	MOY	ASH	SPR	MAY	WEV	BEL	GRN	DAY; ABC	MAS	BRD	OXF	FON	ISL	BRI	MAY	NSH	ATL	COL	WEV	BEL	WSL	DAR; ABC	HIK	RCH	MAC	HIL	MAR	NWS	CLT; ABC	CAR												
1967	AUG	RIV	DAY; ABC	DAY; ABC	DAY; ABC	WEV	BRI	GRN	WSL	ATL	COL	HIK	NWS	MAR	SAV	RCH	DAR; ABC	BEL	LAN	CLT	ASH	MAC	MAY	BIR	GRN	CAR	MON	DAY; ABC	TRN	OXF	FON	ISL	BRI	MAY	NSH	ATL	WSL	COL	SAV	DAR; ABC	HIK	RCH	HIL	MAR	NWS	CLT; ABC	CAR	WEV														
1968	MAC	MON	RIV	DAY; ABC	BRI	RCH	ATL	HIK	GRN	COL	NWS	MAR	AUG	WEV	DAR; ABC	BEL	LAN	CLT	ASH	MAC	MAY	BIR	CAR	GRN	DAY; ABC	ISL	OXF	FON	TRN	BRI	MAY	NSH	ATL	COL	WSL	WEV	SBO	LAN	DAR; ABC	HIK	RCH	BEL	HIL	MAR	NWS	AUG	CLT; ABC	CAR	JEF													
1969	MAC	MON	RIV	DAY	DAY	DAY; ABC	CAR	AUG	BRI	ATL; ABC	COL	HIK	GRN	RCH	NWS	MAR	WEV	DAR; ABC	BEL	LAN	CLT	MAC	MAY	MCH	KIG	GRN	RAL	DAY; ABC	DOV	THP	TRN	BEL	BRI	NSH	MAY	ATL	MCH	SBO	WSL	WEV	DAR; ABC	HIK	RCH	TAL	COL	MAR	NWS	CLT; ABC	SAV	AUG	CAR	JEF	MAC	TWS								
1970	RIV	DAY	DAY	DAY; ABC	RCH	CAR	SAV	ATL	BRI	TAL; ABC	NWS; ABC	COL	DAR; ABC	BEL	LAN	CLT; ABC	MAY	MAR	MCH	RIV	HIK	KIG	GRN	DAY; ABC	MAL	THP	TRN	BRI	MAY	NSH; ABC	ATL	COL	ONA	MCH	TAL	WSL	SBO	DAR; ABC	HIK	RCH	DOV	RAL	NWS; ABC	CLT; ABC	MAR	MAC	CAR	LAN														
1971	RIV	DAY; ABC	DAY; ABC	DAY; ABC	ONT	RCH	CAR	HIK	BRI	ATL; ABC	COL	GRN; ABC	MAY	NWS	MAR	DAR; ABC	SB	TAL; ABC	ASH	KIG	CLT	DOV	MCH	RIV	HOU	GRN	DAY; ABC	BRI	MAL	ISL	TRN	NSH	ATL	WSL; ABC	ONA	MCH	TAL	COL	HIK	DAR; ABC	MAR	CLT; ABC	DOV	CAR	MAC	RCH	NWS	TWS														
1972	RIV	DAY; ABC	RCH	ONT; ABC	CAR; ABC	ATL; ABC	BRI	DAR; ABC	NWS	MAR	TAL	CLT	DOV	MCH	RIV	TWS	DAY; ABC	BRI	TRN	ATL	TAL	MCH	NSH	DAR; ABC	RCH	DOV	MAR	NWS	CLT; ABC	CAR	TWS																															
1973	RIV	DAY; ABC	RCH	BRI	CAR	ATL; ABC	NWS	DAR; ABC	MAR	TAL	NSH	CLT	DOV	TWS	RIV	MCH	DAY; ABC	BRI	ATL	TAL; ABC	NSH	DAR; ABC	RCH	DOV	NWS	MAR	CLT; ABC	CAR																																		
1974	RIV	DAY; ABC	RCH	CAR	BRI	ATL; ABC	DAR	NWS	MAR	TAL	NSH	DOV; ABC	CLT	RIV	MCH	DAY; ABC	BRI	NSH	ATL	POC	TAL; ABC	MCH	DAR; ABC	RCH	DOV	NWS	MAR	CLT; ABC	CAR	ONT																																
1975	RIV	DAY; ABC	RCH	CAR	BRI	ATL; ABC	NWS	DAR; ABC	MAR	TAL; CBS	NSH	DOV	CLT; CBS	RIV	MCH	DAY; ABC	NSH	POC	TAL; ABC	MCH; CBS	DAR; ABC	DOV	NWS	MAR	CLT; ABC	RCH	CAR	BRI	ATL; CBS	ONT																																
1976	RIV	DAY; ABC	CAR	RCH	BRI	ATL; ABC	NWS	DAR; ABC	MAR	TAL; CBS	NSH	DOV	CLT; CBS	RIV; CBS	MCH	DAY; ABC	NSH	POC	TAL; CBS	MCH; CBS	BRI	DAR; ABC	RCH	DOV	MAR	NWS	CLT; ABC	CAR	ATL; CBS	ONT; ABC																																
1977	RIV	DAY; ABC	RCH	CAR	ATL; ABC	NWS	DAR; ABC	BRI	MAR	TAL; CBS	NSH	DOV	CLT; CBS	RIV	MCH	DAY; ABC	NSH	POC	TAL; CBS	MCH	BRI	DAR; ABC	RCH	DOV	MAR	NWS	CLT; ABC	CAR	ATL	ONT; CBS																																
1978	RIV	DAY; ABC	RCH	CAR	ATL; ABC	BRI	DAR; ABC	NWS	MAR	TAL	DOV	CLT; CBS	NSH	RIV	MCH; ABC	DAY; ABC	NSH	POC	TAL; CBS	MCH	BRI	DAR; ABC	RCH	DOV	MAR	NWS	CLT; ABC	CAR	ATL	ONT; CBS																																
1979	RIV	DAY; CBS	CAR	RCH	ATL; ABC	NWS	BRI	DAR; ABC	MAR; MRN TV	TAL; MRN TV	NSH	DOV	CLT; CBS	TWS	RIV	MCH; ABC	DAY; ABC	NSH	POC	TAL; CBS	MCH	BRI	DAR; ABC	RCH	DOV	MAR	CLT; NBC	NWS	CAR	ATL	ONT; CBS																															
1980	RIV	DAY; CBS	RCH	CAR; MRN TV	ATL; ABC	BRI	DAR; ABC	NWS	MAR; MRN TV	TAL; MRN TV	NSH	DOV	CLT; CBS	TWS	RIV	MCH	DAY; ABC	NSH	POC; ABC	TAL; CBS	MCH	BRI	DAR; ABC	RCH	DOV	NWS	MAR	CLT; NBC	CAR; MRN TV	ATL	ONT; CBS																															
1981	RIV; MRN TV	DAY; CBS	RCH	CAR; ESPN	ATL; ABC	BRI	NWS	DAR; ABC	MAR; ESPN	TAL; ESPN	NSH	DOV; ESPN	CLT; CBS	TWS	RIV	MCH	DAY; ABC	NSH	POC; NBC	TAL; CBS	MCH	BRI	DAR; ABC	RCH	DOV	MAR	NWS	CLT; NBC	CAR	ATL; ESPN	RIV																															
1982	DAY; CBS	RCH; ESPN	BRI	ATL; ABC	CAR	DAR; ABC	NWS; ESPN	MAR	TAL; ESPN	NSH	DOV	CLT; Mizlou	POC; Mizlou	RIV	MCH; CBS	DAY; ABC	NSH	POC; Mizlou	TAL; CBS	MCH; ESPN	BRI	DAR; ABC	RCH; ESPN	DOV; TNN	NWS; ESPN	CLT; NBC	MAR	CAR	ATL; ESPN	RIV; Mizlou																																
1983	DAY; CBS	RCH; TBS	CAR; ESPN	ATL; ABC	DAR; ABC	NWS; ESPN	MAR	TAL; NBC	NSH; TNN	DOV; Mizlou	BRI	CLT; Mizlou	RIV; ESPN	POC; Mizlou	MCH; CBS	DAY; ABC	NSH	POC; Mizlou	TAL; CBS	MCH; ESPN	BRI	DAR	RCH; ESPN	DOV; TNN	MAR	NWS; ESPN	CLT; Mizlou	CAR; ESPN	ATL; TBS	RIV; TBS																																
1984	DAY; CBS	RCH; TBS	CAR; SETN	ATL; ABC	BRI	NWS; ESPN	DAR; ESPN	MAR	TAL; NBC	NSH; TBS	DOV; Mizlou	CLT; Mizlou	RIV	POC; ESPN	MCH; CBS	DAY; ABC	NSH	POC; ESPN	TAL; CBS	MCH; ESPN	BRI	DAR; ESPN	RCH	DOV	MAR; SETN	CLT; Mizlou	NWS; ESPN	CAR; SETN	ATL; TBS	RIV; TBS																																
1985	DAY; CBS	RCH; TBS	CAR; SETN	ATL; ABC	BRI; ESPN	DAR; ESPN	NWS; ESPN	MAR; SETN	TAL; NBC	DOV; Mizlou	CLT; Jefferson-Pilot	RIV; TNN	POC; ESPN	MCH; CBS	DAY; ABC	POC; ESPN	TAL; CBS	MCH; ESPN	BRI; ESPN	DAR; ESPN	RCH; SETN	DOV; Mizlou	MAR; SETN	NWS; ESPN	CLT; Jefferson-Pilot	CAR; TBS	ATL; TBS	RIV; TBS																																		
1986	DAY; CBS	RCH; TBS	CAR; SETN	ATL; ABC	BRI; ESPN	DAR; ESPN	NWS; ESPN	MAR; SETN	TAL; ESPN	DOV; Mizlou	CLT; Jefferson-Pilot	RIV; TNN	POC; SETN	MCH; CBS	DAY; ABC	POC; SETN	TAL; CBS	GLN; ESPN	MCH; ESPN	BRI; ESPN	DAR; ESPN	RCH; SETN	DOV; Mizlou	MAR; SETN	NWS; ESPN	CLT; Jefferson-Pilot	CAR; TBS	ATL; ESPN	RIV; TBS																																	
1987	DAY; CBS	CAR; SETN	RCH; TBS	ATL; ABC	DAR; ESPN	NWS; ESPN	BRI; ESPN	MAR; SETN	TAL; ESPN	CLT; Jefferson-Pilot	DOV; ESPN	POC; SETN	RIV; ESPN	MCH; CBS	DAY; ABC	POC; SETN	TAL; CBS	GLN; ESPN	MCH; ESPN	BRI; ESPN	DAR; ESPN	RCH; SETN	DOV; ESPN	MAR; SETN	NWS; ESPN	CLT; SETN	CAR; TBS	RIV; TBS	ATL; ESPN																																	
1988	DAY; CBS	RCH; TBS	CAR; ESPN	ATL; ABC	DAR; ESPN	BRI; ESPN	NWS; ESPN	MAR; SETN	TAL; ESPN	CLT; TBS	DOV; ESPN	RIV; ESPN	POC; SCORE	MCH; CBS	DAY; ABC	POC; PPV	TAL; CBS	GLN; ESPN	MCH; ESPN	BRI; ESPN	DAR; ESPN	RCH; TBS	DOV; ESPN	MAR; ESPN	CLT; SCORE	NWS; ESPN	CAR; ESPN	PHO; ESPN	ATL; ESPN																																	
1989	DAY; CBS	CAR; ESPN	ATL; ABC	RCH; TBS	DAR; ESPN	BRI; ESPN	NWS; ESPN	MAR; ESPN	TAL; ESPN	CLT; TBS	DOV; ESPN	SON; ESPN	POC; PPV	MCH; CBS	DAY; ESPN	POC; ESPN	TAL; CBS	GLN; ESPN	MCH; ESPN	BRI; ESPN	DAR; ESPN	RCH; TBS	DOV; ESPN	MAR; ESPN	CLT; TBS	NWS; ESPN	CAR; ESPN	PHO; ESPN	ATL; ESPN																																	
1990	DAY; CBS	RCH; TBS	CAR; ESPN	ATL; ABC	DAR; ESPN	BRI; ESPN	NWS; ESPN	MAR; ESPN	TAL; ESPN	CLT; TBS	DOV; ESPN	SON; ESPN	POC; PPV	MCH; CBS	DAY; ESPN	POC; ESPN	TAL; CBS	GLN; ESPN	MCH; ESPN	BRI; ESPN	DAR; ESPN	RCH; TBS	DOV; ESPN	MAR; ESPN	NWS; ESPN	CLT; TBS	CAR; ESPN	PHO; ESPN	ATL; ESPN																																	
1991	DAY; CBS	RCH; TBS	CAR; TNN	ATL; ABC	DAR; ESPN	BRI; ESPN	NWS; ESPN	MAR; ESPN	TAL; ESPN	CLT; TBS	DOV; TNN	SON; ESPN	POC; ESPN	MCH; CBS	DAY; ESPN	POC; ESPN	TAL; CBS	GLN; ESPN	MCH; ESPN	BRI; ESPN	DAR; ESPN	RCH; TBS	DOV; TNN	MAR; ESPN	NWS; ESPN	CLT; TBS	CAR; TNN	PHO; TNN	ATL; ESPN																																	
1992	DAY; CBS	CAR; TNN	RCH; TBS	ATL; ABC	DAR; ESPN	BRI; ESPN	NWS; ESPN	MAR; ESPN	TAL; ESPN	CLT; TBS	DOV; TNN	SON; ESPN	POC; ESPN	MCH; CBS	DAY; ESPN	POC; ESPN	TAL; CBS	GLN; ESPN	MCH; ESPN	BRI; ESPN	DAR; ESPN	RCH; TBS	DOV; TNN	MAR; ESPN	NWS; ESPN	CLT; TBS	CAR; TNN	PHO; TNN	ATL; ESPN																																	
1993	DAY; CBS	CAR; TNN	RCH; TBS	ATL; TNN	DAR; ESPN	BRI; ESPN	NWS; ESPN	MAR; ESPN	TAL; ESPN	SON; ESPN	CLT; TBS	DOV; TNN	POC; ESPN	MCH; CBS	DAY; ESPN	NHA; TNN	POC; TBS	TAL; CBS	GLN; ESPN	MCH; ESPN	BRI; ESPN	DAR; ESPN	RCH; TBS	DOV; TNN	MAR; ESPN	NWS; ESPN	CLT; TBS	CAR; TNN	PHO; TNN	ATL; ESPN																																
1994	DAY; CBS	CAR; TNN	RCH; TBS	ATL; ABC	DAR; ESPN	BRI; ESPN	NWS; ESPN	MAR; ESPN	TAL; ESPN	SON; ESPN	CLT; TBS	DOV; TNN	POC; TNN	MCH; CBS	DAY; ESPN	NHA; TNN	POC; TBS	TAL; CBS	IND; ABC	GLN; ESPN	MCH; ESPN	BRI; ESPN	DAR; ESPN	RCH; TBS	DOV; TNN	MAR; ESPN	NWS; ESPN	CLT; TBS	CAR; TNN	PHO; TNN	ATL; ESPN																															
1995	DAY; CBS	CAR; TNN	RCH; TBS	ATL; ABC	DAR; ESPN	BRI; ESPN	NWS; ESPN	MAR; ESPN	TAL; ESPN	SON; ESPN	CLT; TBS	DOV; TNN	POC; TNN	MCH; CBS	DAY; ESPN	NHA; TNN	POC; TBS	TAL; CBS	IND; ESPN	GLN; ESPN	MCH; ESPN	BRI; ESPN	DAR; ESPN	RCH; TBS	DOV; TNN	MAR; ESPN	NWS; ESPN	CLT; TBS	CAR; TNN	PHO; TNN	ATL; ESPN																															
1996	DAY; CBS	CAR; TNN	RCH; ESPN	ATL; ABC	DAR; ESPN	BRI; ESPN	NWS; ESPN	MAR; ESPN	TAL; ESPN	SON; ESPN	CLT; TBS	DOV; TNN	POC; TNN	MCH; CBS	DAY; ESPN	NHA; TNN	POC; TBS	TAL; CBS	IND; ABC	GLN; ESPN	MCH; ESPN	BRI; ESPN	DAR; ESPN	RCH; ESPN	DOV; TNN	MAR; ESPN	NWS; ESPN	CLT; TBS	CAR; TNN	PHO; TNN	ATL; ESPN																															
1997	DAY; CBS	CAR; TNN	RCH; ESPN	ATL; ABC	DAR; ESPN	TEX; CBS	BRI; ESPN	MAR; ESPN	SON; ESPN	TAL; ESPN	CLT; TBS	DOV; TNN	POC; TNN	MCH; CBS	CAL; ABC	DAY; ESPN	NHA; TNN	POC; TBS	IND; ABC	GLN; ESPN	MCH; ESPN	BRI; ESPN	DAR; ESPN	RCH; ESPN	NHA; TNN	DOV; TNN	MAR; ESPN	CLT; TBS	TAL; CBS	CAR; TNN	PHO; TNN	ATL; ESPN																														
1998	DAY; CBS	CAR; TNN	LVS; ABC	ATL; ESPN	DAR; ESPN	BRI; ESPN	TEX; CBS	MAR; ESPN	TAL; ABC	CAL; ESPN	CLT; TBS	DOV; TNN	RCH; ESPN	MCH; CBS	POC; TNN	SON; ESPN	NHA; TNN	POC; TBS	IND; ABC	GLN; ESPN	MCH; ESPN	BRI; ESPN	NHA; TNN	DAR; ESPN	RCH; ESPN	DOV; TNN	MAR; ESPN	CLT; TBS	TAL; ESPN	DAY; TNN	PHO; TNN	CAR; TNN	ATL; ESPN																													
1999	DAY; CBS	CAR; TNN	LVS; ABC	ATL; ABC	DAR; ESPN	TEX; CBS	BRI; ESPN	MAR; ESPN	TAL; ABC	CAL; ABC	RCH; ESPN	CLT; TBS	DOV; TNN	MCH; CBS	POC; TNN	SON; ESPN	DAY; CBS	NHA; TNN	POC; TBS	IND; ABC	GLN; ESPN	MCH; ESPN	BRI; ESPN	DAR; ESPN	RCH; ESPN	NHA; TNN	DOV; TNN	MAR; ESPN	CLT; TBS	TAL; ESPN	CAR; TNN	PHO; TNN	HOM; NBC	ATL; ESPN																												
2000	DAY; CBS	CAR; TNN	LVS; ABC	ATL; ABC	DAR; ESPN	BRI; ESPN	TEX; CBS	MAR; ESPN	TAL; ABC	CAL; ABC	RCH; ESPN	CLT; TBS	DOV; TNN	MCH; CBS	POC; TNN	SON; ESPN	DAY; CBS	NHA; TNN	POC; TBS	IND; ABC	GLN; ESPN	MCH; ESPN	BRI; ESPN	DAR; ESPN	RCH; ESPN	NHA; TNN	DOV; TNN	MAR; ESPN	CLT; TBS	TAL; ESPN	CAR; TNN	PHO; TNN	HOM; NBC	ATL; ESPN																												
Centralized NASCAR TV Contract Era (2001-present)
2001-06 TV Contract (FOX, FX, NBC, TNT)
2001	DAY; FOX	CAR; FX	LVS; FOX	ATL; FOX	DAR; FOX	BRI; FOX	TEX; FOX	MAR; FOX	TAL; FOX	CAL; FOX	RCH; FX	CLT; FOX	DOV; FOX	MCH; FX	POC; FOX	SON; FOX	DAY; NBC	CHI; NBC	NHA; TNT	POC; TNT	IND; NBC	GLN; NBC	MCH; TNT	BRI; TNT	DAR; TNT	RCH; TNT	DOV; NBC	KAN; NBC	CLT; TNT	MAR; TNT	TAL; NBC	PHO; NBC	CAR; TNT	HOM; NBC	ATL; NBC	NHA; NBC																										
2002	DAY; NBC	CAR; FOX	LVS; FOX	ATL; FOX	DAR; FOX	BRI; FOX	TEX; FX	MAR; FX	TAL; FOX	CAL; FOX	RCH; FX	CLT; FOX	DOV; FX	POC; FOX	MCH; FOX	SON; FOX	DAY; FOX	CHI; NBC	NHA; TNT	POC; TNT	IND; NBC	GLN; NBC	MCH; TNT	BRI; TNT	DAR; TNT	RCH; TNT	NHA; NBC	DOV; TNT	KAN; NBC	TAL; NBC	CLT; NBC	MAR; NBC	ATL; NBC	CAR; TNT	PHO; NBC	HOM; NBC																										
2003	DAY; FOX	CAR; FOX	LVS; FOX	ATL; FOX	DAR; FOX	BRI; FOX	TEX; FOX	TAL; FOX	MAR; FOX	CAL; FOX	RCH; FX	CLT; FOX	DOV; FX	POC; FOX	MCH; FOX	SON; FOX	DAY; NBC	CHI; NBC	NHA; TNT	POC; TNT	IND; NBC	GLN; NBC	MCH; TNT	BRI; TNT	DAR; NBC	RCH; TNT	NHA; TNT	DOV; NBC	TAL; NBC	KAN; NBC	CLT; NBC	MAR; NBC	ATL; TNT	PHO; NBC	CAR; TNT	HOM; NBC																										
	Regular season																										Playoff																																			
2004	DAY; NBC	CAR; FOX	LVS; FOX	ATL; FOX	DAR; FOX	BRI; FOX	TEX; FOX	MAR; FOX	TAL; FOX	CAL; FOX	RCH; FX	CLT; FOX	DOV; FX	POC; FOX	MCH; FOX	SON; FOX	DAY; FOX	CHI; NBC	NHA; TNT	POC; TNT	IND; NBC	GLN; TNT	MCH; TNT	BRI; TNT	CAL; NBC	RCH; TNT	NHA; TNT	DOV; TNT	TAL; NBC	KAN; NBC	CLT; NBC	MAR; NBC	ATL; NBC	PHO; NBC	DAR; NBC	HOM; NBC																										
2005	DAY; FOX	CAL; FOX	LVS; FOX	ATL; FOX	BRI; FOX	MAR; FOX	TEX; FOX	PHO; FOX	TAL; FOX	DAR; FOX	RCH; FX	CLT; FOX	DOV; FX	POC; FOX	MCH; FOX	SON; FOX	DAY; NBC	CHI; NBC	NHA; TNT	POC; TNT	IND; NBC	GLN; NBC	MCH; TNT	BRI; TNT	CAL; NBC	RCH; TNT	NHA; TNT	DOV; TNT	TAL; NBC	KAN; NBC	CLT; NBC	MAR; NBC	ATL; NBC	TEX; NBC	PHO; NBC	HOM; NBC																										
2006	DAY; NBC	CAL; FOX	LVS; FOX	ATL; FX	BRI; FOX	MAR; FOX	TEX; FOX	PHO; FOX	TAL; FX	RCH; FX	DAR; FOX	CLT; FOX	DOV; FX	POC; FOX	MCH; FOX	SON; FOX	DAY; FOX	CHI; TNT	NHA; TNT	POC; TNT	IND; NBC	GLN; NBC	MCH; TNT	BRI; TNT	CAL; NBC	RCH; TNT	NHA; TNT	DOV; TNT	KAN; NBC	TAL; NBC	CLT; NBC	MAR; NBC	ATL; NBC	TEX; NBC	PHO; NBC	HOM; NBC																										
2007-14 TV Contract (FOX Sports, Turner Sports, ESPN/ABC)
	Regular season																										Playoff																																			
2007	DAY; FOX	CAL; FOX	LVS; FOX	ATL; FOX	BRI; FOX	MAR; FOX	TEX; FOX	PHO; FOX	TAL; FOX	RCH; FOX	DAR; FOX	CLT; FOX	DOV; FOX	POC; TNT	MCH; TNT	SON; TNT	NHA; TNT	DAY; TNT	CHI; TNT	IND; ESPN	POC; ESPN	GLN; ESPN	MCH; ESPN2	BRI; ESPN	CAL; ESPN	RCH; ABC	NHA; ABC	DOV; ABC	KAN; ESPN	TAL; ABC	CLT; ABC	MAR; ABC	ATL; ABC	TEX; ABC	PHO; ABC	HOM; ABC																										
2008	DAY; FOX	CAL; FOX	LVS; FOX	ATL; FOX	BRI; FOX	MAR; FOX	TEX; FOX	PHO; FOX	TAL; FOX	RCH; FOX	DAR; FOX	CLT; FOX	DOV; FOX	POC; TNT	MCH; TNT	SON; TNT	NHA; TNT	DAY; TNT	CHI; TNT	IND; ESPN	POC; ESPN	GLN; ESPN	MCH; ESPN	BRI; ESPN	CAL; ESPN	RCH; ESPN	NHA; ABC	DOV; ABC	KAN; ABC	TAL; ABC	CLT; ABC	MAR; ABC	ATL; ABC	TEX; ABC	PHO; ABC	HOM; ABC																										
2009	DAY; FOX	CAL; FOX	LVS; FOX	ATL; FOX	BRI; FOX	MAR; FOX	TEX; FOX	PHO; FOX	TAL; FOX	RCH; FOX	DAR; FOX	CLT; FOX	DOV; FOX	POC; TNT	MCH; TNT	SON; TNT	NHA; TNT	DAY; TNT	CHI; TNT	IND; ESPN	POC; ESPN	GLN; ESPN	MCH; ESPN	BRI; ESPN	ATL; ESPN	RCH; ESPN	NHA; ESPN	DOV; ESPN	KAN; ABC	CAL; ABC	CLT; ABC	MAR; ESPN	TAL; ABC	TEX; ABC	PHO; ESPN	HOM; ABC																										
2010	DAY; FOX	CAL; FOX	LVS; FOX	ATL; FOX	BRI; FOX	MAR; FOX	PHO; FOX	TEX; FOX	TAL; FOX	RCH; FOX	DAR; FOX	DOV; FOX	CLT; FOX	POC; TNT	MCH; TNT	SON; TNT	NHA; TNT	DAY; TNT	CHI; TNT	IND; ESPN	POC; ESPN	GLN; ESPN	MCH; ESPN	BRI; ABC	ATL; ESPN	RCH; ABC	NHA; ESPN	DOV; ESPN	KAN; ESPN	CAL; ESPN	CLT; ABC	MAR; ESPN	TAL; ESPN	TEX; ESPN	PHO; ESPN	HOM; ESPN																										
2011	DAY; FOX	PHO; FOX	LVS; FOX	BRI; FOX	CAL; FOX	MAR; FOX	TEX; FOX	TAL; FOX	RCH; FOX	DAR; FOX	DOV; FOX	CLT; FOX	KAN; FOX	POC; TNT	MCH; TNT	SON; TNT	DAY; TNT	KEN; TNT	NHA; TNT	IND; ESPN	POC; ESPN	GLN; ESPN	MCH; ESPN	BRI; ABC	ATL; ESPN	RCH; ABC	CHI; ESPN	NHA; ESPN	DOV; ESPN	KAN; ESPN	CLT; ABC	TAL; ESPN	MAR; ESPN	TEX; ESPN	PHO; ESPN	HOM; ESPN																										
2012	DAY; FOX	PHO; FOX	LVS; FOX	BRI; FOX	CAL; FOX	MAR; FOX	TEX; FOX	KAN; FOX	RCH; FOX	TAL; FOX	DAR; FOX	CLT; FOX	DOV; FOX	POC; TNT	MCH; TNT	SON; TNT	KEN; TNT	DAY; TNT	NHA; TNT	IND; ESPN	POC; ESPN	GLN; ESPN	MCH; ESPN	BRI; ABC	ATL; ESPN	RCH; ABC	CHI; ESPN	NHA; ESPN	DOV; ESPN	TAL; ESPN	CLT; ABC	KAN; ESPN	MAR; ESPN	TEX; ESPN	PHO; ESPN	HOM; ESPN																										
2013	DAY; FOX	PHO; FOX	LVS; FOX	BRI; FOX	CAL; FOX	MAR; FOX	TEX; FOX	KAN; FOX	RCH; FOX	TAL; FOX	DAR; FOX	CLT; FOX	DOV; FOX	POC; TNT	MCH; TNT	SON; TNT	KEN; TNT	DAY; TNT	NHA; TNT	IND; ESPN	POC; ESPN	GLN; ESPN	MCH; ESPN	BRI; ABC	ATL; ESPN	RCH; ABC	CHI; ESPN	NHA; ESPN	DOV; ESPN	KAN; ESPN	CLT; ABC	TAL; ESPN	MAR; ESPN	TEX; ESPN	PHO; ESPN	HOM; ESPN																										
	Regular Season																										Playoff																																			
	Regular Season																										Round of 16			Round of 12			Round of 8			Champ Race																										
2014	DAY; FOX	PHO; FOX	LVS; FOX	BRI; FOX	CAL; FOX	MAR; FOX	TEX; FOX	DAR; FOX	RCH; FOX	TAL; FOX	KAN; FOX	CLT; FOX	DOV; FOX	POC; TNT	MCH; TNT	SON; TNT	KEN; TNT	DAY; TNT	NHA; TNT	IND; ESPN	POC; ESPN	GLN; ESPN	MCH; ESPN	BRI; ABC	ATL; ESPN	RCH; ABC	CHI; ESPN	NHA; ESPN	DOV; ESPN	KAN; ESPN	CLT; ABC	TAL; ESPN	MAR; ESPN	TEX; ESPN	PHO; ESPN	HOM; ESPN																										
2015-24 TV Contract (FOX Sports, NBCUniversal)
	Regular Season																										Playoff																																			
	Regular Season																										Round of 16			Round of 12			Round of 8			Champ Race																										
2015	DAY; FOX	ATL; FOX	LVS; FOX	PHO; FOX	CAL; FOX	MAR; FS1	TEX; FOX	BRI; FOX	RCH; FOX	TAL; FOX	KAN; FS1	CLT; FOX	DOV; FS1	POC; FS1	MCH; FS1	SON; FS1	DAY; NBC	KEN; NBCSN	NHA; NBCSN	IND; NBCSN	POC; NBCSN	GLN; NBCSN	MCH; NBCSN	BRI; NBCSN	DAR; NBC	RCH; NBCSN	CHI; NBCSN	NHA; NBCSN	DOV; NBCSN	CLT; NBCSN	KAN; NBC	TAL; NBCSN	MAR; NBCSN	TEX; NBC	PHO; NBCSN	HOM; NBC																										
2016	DAY; FOX	ATL; FOX	LVS; FOX	PHO; FOX	CAL; FOX	MAR; FS1	TEX; FOX	BRI; FOX	RCH; FOX	TAL; FOX	KAN; FS1	DOV; FS1	CLT; FOX	POC; FS1	MCH; FS1	SON; FS1	DAY; NBC	KEN; NBCSN	NHA; NBCSN	IND; NBCSN	POC; NBCSN	GLN; USA	BRI; NBCSN	MCH; NBCSN	DAR; NBC	RCH; NBCSN	CHI; NBCSN	NHA; NBCSN	DOV; NBCSN	CLT; NBC	KAN; NBC	TAL; NBCSN	MAR; NBCSN	TEX; NBCSN	PHO; NBC	HOM; NBC																										
2017	DAY; FOX	ATL; FOX	LVS; FOX	PHO; FOX	CAL; FOX	MAR; FS1	TEX; FOX	BRI; FOX	RCH; FOX	TAL; FOX	KAN; FS1	CLT; FOX	DOV; FS1	POC; FS1	MCH; FS1	SON; FS1	DAY; NBC	KEN; NBCSN	NHA; NBCSN	IND; NBC	POC; NBCSN	GLN; NBCSN	MCH; NBCSN	BRI; NBC	DAR; NBCSN	RCH; NBCSN	CHI; NBCSN	NHA; NBCSN	DOV; NBCSN	CLT; NBC	TAL; NBC	KAN; NBCSN	MAR; NBCSN	TEX; NBCSN	PHO; NBC	HOM; NBC																										
2018	DAY; FOX	ATL; FOX	LVS; FOX	ISM; FOX	CAL; FOX	MAR; FS1	TEX; FS1	BRI; FOX	RCH; FOX	TAL; FOX	DOV; FS1	KAN; FS1	CLT; FOX	POC; FS1	MCH; FOX	SON; FS1	CHI; NBCSN	DAY; NBC	KEN; NBCSN	NHA; NBCSN	POC; NBCSN	GLN; NBC	MCH; NBCSN	BRI; NBCSN	DAR; NBC	IND; NBCSN	LVS; NBC	RCH; NBCSN	CLT; NBC	DOV; NBCSN	TAL; NBC	KAN; NBC	MAR; NBCSN	TEX; NBCSN	ISM; NBC	HOM; NBC																										
2019	DAY; FOX	ATL; FOX	LVS; FOX	ISM; FOX	CAL; FOX	MAR; FS1	TEX; FOX	BRI; FS1	RCH; FOX	TAL; FOX	DOV; FS1	KAN; FS1	CLT; FOX	POC; FS1	MCH; FS1	SON; FS1	CHI; NBCSN	DAY; NBC	KEN; NBCSN	NHA; NBCSN	POC; NBCSN	GLN; NBCSN	MCH; NBCSN	BRI; NBCSN	DAR; NBCSN	IND; NBC	LVS; NBCSN	RCH; NBCSN	CLT; NBC	DOV; NBCSN	TAL; NBCSN	KAN; NBC	MAR; NBCSN	TEX; NBCSN	ISM; NBC	HOM; NBC																										
2020	DAY; FOX	LVS; FOX	CAL; FOX	PHO; FOX	DAR; FOX	DAR; FS1	CLT; FOX	CLT; FS1	BRI; FS1	ATL; FOX	MAR; FS1	HOM; FOX	TAL; FOX	POC; FOX	POC; FS1	IND; NBC	KEN; FS1	TEX; NBCSN	KAN; NBCSN	NHA; NBCSN	MCH; NBCSN	MCH; NBCSN	DAY; NBC	DOV; NBCSN	DOV; NBCSN	DAY; NBC	DAR; NBCSN	RCH; NBCSN	BRI; NBCSN	LVS; NBCSN	TAL; NBC	CLT; NBC	KAN; NBC	TEX; NBCSN	MAR; NBC	PHO; NBC																										
2021	DAY; FOX	DAY; FOX	HOM; FOX	LVS; FOX	PHO; FOX	ATL; FOX	BRD; FOX	MAR; FS1	RCH; FOX	TAL; FOX	KAN; FS1	DAR; FS1	DOV; FS1	COA; FS1	CLT; FOX	SON; FS1	NSH; NBCSN	POC; NBCSN	POC; NBCSN	ROA; NBC	ATL; NBCSN	NHA; NBCSN	GLN; NBCSN	IRC; NBC	MCH; NBCSN	DAY; NBC	DAR; NBCSN	RCH; NBCSN	BRI; NBCSN	LVS; NBCSN	TAL; NBCSN	CLT; NBC	TEX; NBC	KAN; NBCSN	MAR; NBC	PHO; NBC																										
2022	DAY; FOX	CAL; FOX	LVS; FOX	PHO; FOX	ATL; FOX	COTA; FOX	RCH; FOX	MAR; FS1	BRD; FOX	TAL; FOX	DOV; FS1	DAR; FS1	KAN; FS1	CLT; FOX	WWT; FS1	SON; FS1	NSH; NBC	ROA; USA	ATL; USA	NHA; USA	POC; USA	IRC; NBC	MCH; USA	RCH; USA	GLN; USA	DAY; CNBC	DAR; USA	KAN; USA	BRI; USA	TEX; USA	TAL; NBC	CLT; NBC	LVS; NBC	HOM; NBC	MAR; NBC	PHO; NBC																										
2023	DAY; FOX	CAL; FOX	LVS; FOX	PHO; FOX	ATL; FOX	COTA; FOX	RCH; FS1	BRD; FOX	MAR; FS1	TAL; FOX	DOV; FS1	KAN; FS1	DAR; FS1	CLT; FOX	WWT; FS1	SON; FOX	NSH; NBC	CSC; NBC	ATL; USA	NHA; USA	POC; USA	RCH; USA	MCH; USA	IRC; NBC	GLN; USA	DAY; NBC	DAR; USA	KAN; USA	BRI; USA	TEX; USA	TAL; NBC	CLT; NBC	LVS; NBC	HOM; NBC	MAR; NBC	PHO; NBC																										
2024	DAY; FOX	ATL; FOX	LVS; FOX	PHO; FOX	BRI; FOX	COTA; FOX	RCH; FOX	MAR; FS1	TEX; FS1	TAL; FOX	DOV; FS1	KAN; FS1	DAR; FS1	CLT; FOX	WWT; FS1	SON; FOX	IOW; USA	NHA; USA	NSH; NBC	CSC; NBC	POC; USA	IND; NBC	RCH; USA	MCH; USA	DAY; NBC	DAR; USA	ATL; USA	GLN; USA	BRI; USA	KAN; USA	TAL; NBC	CLT; NBC	LVS; NBC	HOM; NBC	MAR; NBC	PHO; NBC																										
2025–31 TV Contract (FOX Sports, Amazon Prime Video, TNT Sports, NBCUniversal)
	Regular Season																										Playoff																																			
	Regular Season																										Round of 16			Round of 12			Round of 8			Champ Race																										
2025	DAY; FOX	ATL; FOX	COTA; FOX	PHO; FS1	LVS; FS1	HOM; FS1	MAR; FS1	DAR; FS1	BRI; FS1	TAL; FOX	TEX; FS1	KAN; FS1	CLT; Prime	NSH; Prime	MCH; Prime	MEX; Prime	POC; Prime	ATL; TNT	CHI; TNT	SON; TNT	DOV; TNT	IND; TNT	IOW; USA	GLN; USA	RCH; USA	DAY; NBC	DAR; USA	WWT; USA	BRI; USA	NHA; USA	KAN; USA	CLT; USA	LVS; USA	TAL; NBC	MAR; NBC	PHO; NBC																										
	Regular Season																										Playoff																																			
2026	DAY; FOX	ATL; FOX	COTA; FOX	PHO; FS1	LVS; FS1	DAR; FS1	MAR; FS1	BRI; FS1	KAN; FOX	TAL; FOX	TEX; FS1	GLN; FS1	CLT; Prime	NSH; Prime	MCH; Prime	POC; Prime	SD; Prime	SON; TNT	CHI; TNT	ATL; TNT	NWS; TNT	IND; TNT	IOW; USA	RCH; USA	NHA USA	DAY; NBC	DAR; USA	WWT; USA	BRI; USA	KAN; USA	LVS; USA	CLT; USA	PHO; USA	TAL; NBC	MAR; NBC	HOM; NBC																										

== Radio ==
=== Current broadcasts ===
Currently, three separate networks cover NASCAR races on radio:

- MRN: Founded by Ken Squier and Bill France Jr. in 1971, it covers all NASCAR Cup Series and NASCAR Xfinity Series events at tracks owned by NASCAR and other independently owned tracks and races not owned or operated by Speedway Motorsports and Indianapolis Motor Speedway.
- PRN: Covers all NASCAR Cup Series and Xfinity Series events at tracks owned by Speedway Motorsports and Circuit of the Americas.
- NRN: Covers all events of the Truck Series. owned both by PRN and MRN.
- IndyCar Radio Network: Covers the Xfinty Series and NASCAR Cup Series races at the Indianapolis Motor Speedway. It is produced in a joint venture with PRN.

From 2002 to 2006, all races were heard on XM channel 90 across the continental United States. In 2007, national satellite radio rights moved to Sirius channel 90. Among the programs on Sirius NASCAR Radio are a weekly program co-hosted by TV pit reporter Matt Yocum and Tony Stewart, and a morning drive time show formerly hosted by David Poole of The Charlotte Observer and Marty Snider of NBC and TNT. The Morning Drive is now hosted by MRN turn announcer Mike Bagley and MRN lead writer Pete Pistone. PRN's Jim Noble and Richard Childress Racing Museum curator and former fueler Danny "Chocolate" Myers host the afternoon show called Tradin Paint. Longtime MRN turn announcer Dave Moody hosts SiriusXM Speedway. PRN pit reporter and turn announcer Brad Gillie co-hosts the Late Shift with Kenny Wallace. He's also the regular host of the weekend show Press Pass. Pat Patterson, also PRN turn announcer, hosts the weekend show The Frontstretch.

Following the merger of XM and Sirius, Sirius NASCAR Radio is heard on the XM through the "Best of Sirius" package on channel 90.

Both networks also have affiliation deals with hundreds of local radio stations. Many stations sign with more than one of these networks to ensure coverage of the entire season. However, for Indianapolis, if there is a conflict between the INDYCAR Radio affiliate and the radio station that carries NASCAR races, the INDYCAR Radio affiliate has first choice of carrying the race.

== International broadcast ==
In 2020, NASCAR created a worldwide television feed for broadcasts outside the United States.

=== 2026 International TV broadcasters ===
Country	TV Network	Language	Free-to-air / Free-to-view / Pay	Trucks	O'Reilly	Cup	Notes
Africa	SuperSport	Varies	Pay	Live	Live	Live	
Australia	Fox Sports	English	Pay	No	No	Live	
Austria	Sportdigital1+	German and English	Pay	No	No	Live	Deal until 2027.
Brazil	Xsports	Portuguese	Free	No	No	Live	
Brazil	PicTV	Portuguese	Free	Live	Live	Live	Deal until 2027. All races are broadcast via streaming.
Brazil	ESPN	Portuguese	Pay	Live	Live	Live	
Bulgaria	Max Sport	Bulgarian	Pay	No	No	Live	
Canada	TSN	English	Pay	No	Live	Live	All Practices, Qualifyings, and Xfinity races streaming on TSN+. Select Cup races are simulcast on CTV.
Canada	USA Network	English	Pay	No	Live	No	
Canada	CTV Speed Channel	English	Pay	Live	No	No	
Canada	Fox Sports Racing	English	Pay	Live	No	No*	*Simulcast of Practices, Qualifyings and Exhibition Races broadcast on FS1/FS2
Canada	RDS	French	Pay	No	Live*	Live*	*Subject to other live events.
Croatia	Sport Klub	Croatian	Pay	No	No	Live	Commercial-free.
Czech Republic	Arena Sport	Slovak	Pay	No	Live	No	Commercial-free.
France	Automoto La chaîne	French	Pay	No	No	Live	
Germany	Sportdigital1+	German and English	Pay	No	No	Live	Deal until 2027.
Greece	ANT1+	Greek	Pay	No	No	Live	Deal until 2026.
Hungary	Arena4	Hungarian	Pay	Live	Live	Live	Races streaming on Net4+.
Hungary	Match4	Hungarian	Pay	Live	Live	Live	Races streaming on Net4+.
Ireland	Premier Sports	English	Pay	Live	Live	Live	Commercial-free. Deal until 2026.
Japan	Gaora Sports	Japanese	Pay	No	No	Live	Broadcasts select races.
Japan	Abema	Japanese	Free	No	No	Delayed	
Macau	SPOTV	English	Pay	No	No	Live	
Mexico	Fox Sports 3	Spanish	Pay	Live	Live	Live	
Mexico	TelevisaUnivision	Spanish	Free	Highlights	Highlights	Live* and Highlights	*Mexico City race will be shown live on Canal 5. All races and highlights are streamed on ViX.
Middle East and North Africa	Dubai Sports	English; Arabic	Free	No	No	Live	
Mongolia	SPOTV	English	Pay	No	No	Live	
Netherlands	Ziggo Sport Totaal	Dutch	Pay	Live	Live	Live	Commercial-free. Choice between the original or Dutch Commentary. Deal until 2029.
New Zealand	ThreeNow	English	Free	No	Live	Live	Highlights of all races are broadcast on CRC Motorsport.
Poland	Motowizja	Polish	Pay	No	No	Live/Delayed	Highlights produced in addition to every race.
Portugal	Sport TV	Portuguese	Pay	Live	Live	Live	Commercial-free.
Scandinavia	V Sport Motor	Norwegian; Swedish	Pay	Live	Live	Live	Commercial-free.
Serbia	Sport Klub	Serbian	Pay	No	No	Live	Commercial-free.
Slovakia	Arena Sport	Slovak	Pay	No	Live	No	Commercial-free.
Slovenia	Sport Klub	Slovenian	Pay	No	No	Live	
South Korea	Coupang Play	Korean	Pay	Live	Live	Live	Commercial-free. Sports Pass Limited
Southeast Asia (Indonesia, Malaysia, Philippines, Singapore, Thailand, and Vietnam)	SPOTV	English	Pay	No	No	Live	
Spain	DAZN	Spanish	Pay	Live	Live	Live	Deal until 2026.
Switzerland	Sportdigital1+	German and English	Pay	No	No	Live	Deal until 2027.
United Kingdom	Premier Sports	English	Pay	Live	Live	Live	Commercial-free. Deal until 2026..

=== International announcers ===
Country	TV Network	Language	Lap-by-lap	Co-commentator/Analyst
Austria	Sportdigital1+	German	Pete Fink	André Wiegold
Brazil	BandSports	Portuguese	Sérgio Lago; Octávio Muniz	Lipe Paíga; Tiago Mendonça
Canada	RDS	French	Didier Schraenen; Dominic Fugère (fill-in)	Patrick Carpentier; Marc Cantin
Czech Republic	Arena Sport	Slovak	Vlado Kováč	
France	Automoto La chaîne	French	Pat Angeli; Philippe Chéreau	
Germany	Sportdigital1+	German	Pete Fink	André Wiegold
Hungary	Arena4	Hungarian	Zsolt Kun; Zsombor Parrag	Dr. Zoltán Juhász
Hungary	Match4	Hungarian	Zsolt Kun; Zsombor Parrag	Dr. Zoltán Juhász
Japan	Gaora Sports	Japanese	Hiroshi Tsujino; Takuya Nakazawa	Masahiuko Amano; Robert Yemen
Japan	Abema	Japanese	Takao Masuda	Takuma Koga
Mexico	FOX Sports 3	Spanish	Juan Carlos Casco	Ricardo "El Pato" Galindo
Netherlands	Ziggo Sport Totaal	Dutch	Rick Winkelman	
Poland	Motowizja	Polish	Szymon Tworz	Michał Budziak
Portugal	Sport TV	Portuguese	Bruno Aguiar; José Manuel Costa	
Slovakia	Arena Sport	Slovak	Vlado Kováč	
Spain	DAZN	Spanish	David de Sánchez	Javier Quilón
Switzerland	Sportdigital1+	German	Pete Fink	André Wiegold
