= 2026 South Point 400 =

NASCAR Cup Series race

Race details
- Race 31 of 36 in the 2026 NASCAR Cup Series
- Date: October 4, 2026
- Location: Las Vegas Motor Speedway, Las Vegas, Nevada
- Course: Permanent racing facility
- Course length: 1.5 miles (2.4 km)
- Distance: 267 laps, 400.5 mi (644.54 km)
- Average speed: 147.363 miles per hour (237.158 km/h)

Pole position
Driver	Denny Hamlin	Joe Gibbs Racing
- Time: 28.910

Most laps led
Driver	Chase Briscoe	Joe Gibbs Racing
- Laps: 175

Fastest lap
Driver	Denny Hamlin	Joe Gibbs Racing
- Time: 29.572

Winner
No. 19	Chase Briscoe	Joe Gibbs Racing

Television in the United States
- Network: USA
- Announcers: Leigh Diffey, Jeff Burton and Steve Letarte

Radio in the United States
- Radio: PRN
- Booth announcers: Brad Gillie and Nick Yeoman
- Turn announcers: Andrew Kurland (1 & 2) and Pat Patterson (3 & 4)

The 2026 South Point 400 was a NASCAR Cup Series race held on October 4, 2026, at Las Vegas Motor Speedway in Las Vegas, Nevada on the 1.5-mile (2.4 km) asphalt oval, it was the 31st race of the 2026 NASCAR Cup Series season, and the fifth race of the NASCAR Chase.

Chase Briscoe won the race. Kyle Larson finished 2nd, and Tyler Reddick finished 3rd. Austin Cindric and Ryan Blaney rounded out the top five, and William Byron, Chase Elliott, Bubba Wallace, Shane van Gisbergen, and Joey Logano rounded out the top ten.

== Report ==
=== Background ===
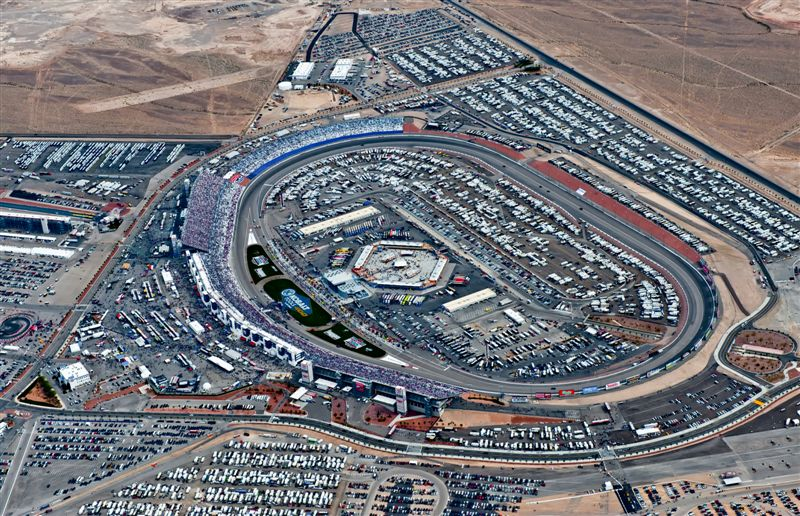
Las Vegas Motor Speedway, the track where the race was held.

Las Vegas Motor Speedway, located in Clark County, Nevada outside the Las Vegas city limits and about 15 miles northeast of the Las Vegas Strip, is a 1,200-acre (490 ha) complex of multiple tracks for motorsports racing. The complex is owned by Speedway Motorsports, Inc., which is headquartered in Charlotte, North Carolina.

==== Entry list ====
- (R) denotes rookie driver.
- (i) denotes driver who is ineligible for series driver points.
- (CC) denotes chase contender.

No.	Driver	Team	Manufacturer
1	Ross Chastain	Trackhouse Racing	Chevrolet
2	Austin Cindric (CC)	Team Penske	Ford
3	Austin Dillon	Richard Childress Racing	Chevrolet
4	Noah Gragson	Front Row Motorsports	Ford
5	Kyle Larson (CC)	Hendrick Motorsports	Chevrolet
6	Brad Keselowski	RFK Racing	Ford
7	Daniel Suárez (CC)	Spire Motorsports	Chevrolet
9	Chase Elliott (CC)	Hendrick Motorsports	Chevrolet
10	Ty Dillon	Kaulig Racing	Chevrolet
11	Denny Hamlin (CC)	Joe Gibbs Racing	Toyota
12	Ryan Blaney (CC)	Team Penske	Ford
16	A. J. Allmendinger	Kaulig Racing	Chevrolet
17	Chris Buescher (CC)	RFK Racing	Ford
19	Chase Briscoe (CC)	Joe Gibbs Racing	Toyota
20	Christopher Bell (CC)	Joe Gibbs Racing	Toyota
21	Josh Berry	Wood Brothers Racing	Ford
22	Joey Logano (CC)	Team Penske	Ford
23	Bubba Wallace (CC)	23XI Racing	Toyota
24	William Byron (CC)	Hendrick Motorsports	Chevrolet
33	Austin Hill (i)	Richard Childress Racing	Chevrolet
34	Todd Gilliland	Front Row Motorsports	Ford
35	Riley Herbst	23XI Racing	Toyota
38	Zane Smith	Front Row Motorsports	Ford
41	Cole Custer	Haas Factory Team	Ford
42	John Hunter Nemechek	Legacy Motor Club	Toyota
43	Erik Jones	Legacy Motor Club	Toyota
45	Tyler Reddick (CC)	23XI Racing	Toyota
47	Ricky Stenhouse Jr.	Hyak Motorsports	Chevrolet
48	Alex Bowman	Hendrick Motorsports	Chevrolet
51	Cody Ware	Rick Ware Racing	Chevrolet
54	Ty Gibbs (CC)	Joe Gibbs Racing	Toyota
60	Ryan Preece (CC)	RFK Racing	Ford
71	Michael McDowell	Spire Motorsports	Chevrolet
77	Carson Hocevar (CC)	Spire Motorsports	Chevrolet
88	Connor Zilisch (R)	Trackhouse Racing	Chevrolet
97	Shane van Gisbergen	Trackhouse Racing	Chevrolet
Official entry list

== Practice ==
William Byron was the fastest in the practice session, with a time of 29.632 seconds and a speed of 182.235 mph (293.279 km/h).

=== Practice results ===
Pos	No.	Driver	Team	Manufacturer	Time	Speed
1	24	William Byron (CC)	Hendrick Motorsports	Chevrolet	29.632	182.235
2	5	Kyle Larson (CC)	Hendrick Motorsports	Chevrolet	29.697	181.837
3	11	Denny Hamlin (CC)	Joe Gibbs Racing	Toyota	29.761	181.446
Official practice results

== Qualifying ==
Denny Hamlin scored the pole for the race with a time of 28.910 and a speed of 186.787 mph (300.605 km/h).

Josh Berry and Noah Gragson did not set times due to crashing in Practice.

=== Qualifying results ===
Pos	No.	Driver	Team	Manufacturer	Time	Speed
1	11	Denny Hamlin (CC)	Joe Gibbs Racing	Toyota	28.910	186.787
2	54	Ty Gibbs (CC)	Joe Gibbs Racing	Toyota	28.927	186.677
3	20	Christopher Bell (CC)	Joe Gibbs Racing	Toyota	28.998	186.220
4	19	Chase Briscoe (CC)	Joe Gibbs Racing	Toyota	29.011	186.136
5	45	Tyler Reddick (CC)	23XI Racing	Toyota	29.015	186.111
6	5	Kyle Larson (CC)	Hendrick Motorsports	Chevrolet	29.054	185.861
7	2	Austin Cindric (CC)	Team Penske	Ford	29.144	185.287
8	24	William Byron (CC)	Hendrick Motorsports	Chevrolet	29.153	185.230
9	23	Bubba Wallace (CC)	23XI Racing	Toyota	29.177	185.077
10	77	Carson Hocevar (CC)	Spire Motorsports	Chevrolet	29.185	185.027
11	7	Daniel Suárez (CC)	Spire Motorsports	Chevrolet	29.211	184.862
12	60	Ryan Preece (CC)	RFK Racing	Ford	29.279	184.433
13	9	Chase Elliott (CC)	Hendrick Motorsports	Chevrolet	29.280	184.426
14	17	Chris Buescher (CC)	RFK Racing	Ford	29.340	184.049
15	48	Alex Bowman	Hendrick Motorsports	Chevrolet	29.360	183.924
16	6	Brad Keselowski	RFK Racing	Ford	29.387	183.755
17	1	Ross Chastain	Trackhouse Racing	Chevrolet	29.387	183.755
18	71	Michael McDowell	Spire Motorsports	Chevrolet	29.387	183.755
19	16	A. J. Allmendinger	Kaulig Racing	Chevrolet	29.426	183.511
20	12	Ryan Blaney (CC)	Team Penske	Ford	29.431	183.480
21	43	Erik Jones	Legacy Motor Club	Toyota	29.478	183.187
22	35	Riley Herbst	23XI Racing	Toyota	29.488	183.125
23	22	Joey Logano (CC)	Team Penske	Ford	29.490	183.113
24	41	Cole Custer	Haas Factory Team	Chevrolet	29.573	182.599
25	97	Shane van Gisbergen	Trackhouse Racing	Chevrolet	29.586	182.519
26	47	Ricky Stenhouse Jr.	Hyak Motorsports	Chevrolet	29.675	181.971
27	34	Todd Gilliland	Front Row Motorsports	Ford	29.695	181.849
28	3	Austin Dillon	Richard Childress Racing	Chevrolet	29.716	181.720
29	10	Ty Dillon	Kaulig Racing	Chevrolet	29.773	181.372
30	38	Zane Smith	Front Row Motorsports	Ford	29.788	181.281
31	88	Connor Zilisch (R)	Trackhouse Racing	Chevrolet	29.895	180.632
32	42	John Hunter Nemechek	Legacy Motor Club	Toyota	29.942	180.349
33	33	Austin Hill (i)	Richard Childress Racing	Chevrolet	30.055	179.671
34	51	Cody Ware	Rick Ware Racing	Chevrolet	30.259	178.459
35	21	Josh Berry	Wood Brothers Racing	Ford	0.000	0.000
36	4	Noah Gragson	Front Row Motorsports	Ford	0.000	0.000
Official qualifying results

== Race ==
=== Race results ===
==== Stage results ====
Stage One Laps: 80

Pos	No	Driver	Team	Manufacturer	Points
1	19	Chase Briscoe (CC)	Joe Gibbs Racing	Toyota	10
2	20	Christopher Bell (CC)	Joe Gibbs Racing	Toyota	9
3	12	Ryan Blaney (CC)	Team Penske	Ford	8
4	45	Tyler Reddick (CC)	23XI Racing	Toyota	7
5	2	Austin Cindric (CC)	Team Penske	Ford	6
6	7	Daniel Suárez (CC)	Spire Motorsports	Chevrolet	5
7	23	Bubba Wallace (CC)	23XI Racing	Toyota	4
8	77	Carson Hocevar (CC)	Spire Motorsports	Chevrolet	3
9	48	Alex Bowman	Hendrick Motorsports	Chevrolet	2
10	71	Michael McDowell	Spire Motorsports	Chevrolet	1

Stage Two Laps: 85

Pos	No	Driver	Team	Manufacturer	Points
1	19	Chase Briscoe (CC)	Joe Gibbs Racing	Toyota	10
2	2	Austin Cindric (CC)	Team Penske	Ford	9
3	20	Christopher Bell (CC)	Joe Gibbs Racing	Toyota	8
4	12	Ryan Blaney (CC)	Team Penske	Ford	7
5	23	Bubba Wallace (CC)	23XI Racing	Toyota	6
6	22	Joey Logano (CC)	Team Penske	Ford	5
7	9	Chase Elliott (CC)	Hendrick Motorsports	Chevrolet	4
8	24	William Byron (CC)	Hendrick Motorsports	Chevrolet	3
9	17	Chris Buescher (CC)	RFK Racing	Ford	2
10	5	Kyle Larson (CC)	Hendrick Motorsports	Chevrolet	1

=== Final Stage results ===
Stage Three Laps: 102

Pos	Grid	No	Driver	Team	Manufacturer	Laps	Points
1	4	19	Chase Briscoe (CC)	Joe Gibbs Racing	Toyota	267	75
2	6	5	Kyle Larson (CC)	Hendrick Motorsports	Chevrolet	267	36
3	5	45	Tyler Reddick (CC)	23XI Racing	Toyota	267	41
4	7	2	Austin Cindric (CC)	Team Penske	Ford	267	48
5	20	12	Ryan Blaney (CC)	Team Penske	Ford	267	47
6	8	24	William Byron (CC)	Hendrick Motorsports	Chevrolet	267	34
7	13	9	Chase Elliott (CC)	Hendrick Motorsports	Chevrolet	267	34
8	9	23	Bubba Wallace (CC)	23XI Racing	Toyota	267	39
9	25	97	Shane van Gisbergen	Trackhouse Racing	Chevrolet	267	28
10	23	22	Joey Logano (CC)	Team Penske	Ford	267	32
11	15	48	Alex Bowman	Hendrick Motorsports	Chevrolet	267	28
12	10	77	Carson Hocevar (CC)	Spire Motorsports	Chevrolet	267	28
13	14	17	Chris Buescher (CC)	RFK Racing	Ford	267	26
14	11	7	Daniel Suárez (CC)	Spire Motorsports	Chevrolet	267	28
15	19	16	A. J. Allmendinger	Kaulig Racing	Chevrolet	267	22
16	1	11	Denny Hamlin (CC)	Joe Gibbs Racing	Toyota	267	22
17	2	54	Ty Gibbs (CC)	Joe Gibbs Racing	Toyota	267	20
18	22	35	Riley Herbst	23XI Racing	Toyota	267	19
19	28	3	Austin Dillon	Richard Childress Racing	Chevrolet	267	18
20	36	4	Noah Gragson	Front Row Motorsports	Ford	267	17
21	18	71	Michael McDowell	Spire Motorsports	Chevrolet	267	17
22	33	33	Austin Hill (i)	Richard Childress Racing	Chevrolet	266	0
23	3	20	Christopher Bell (CC)	Joe Gibbs Racing	Toyota	266	31
24	16	6	Brad Keselowski	RFK Racing	Ford	266	13
25	21	43	Erik Jones	Legacy Motor Club	Toyota	266	12
26	35	21	Josh Berry	Wood Brothers Racing	Ford	266	11
27	24	41	Cole Custer	Haas Factory Team	Chevrolet	266	10
28	12	60	Ryan Preece (CC)	RFK Racing	Ford	265	9
29	32	42	John Hunter Nemechek	Legacy Motor Club	Toyota	265	8
30	17	1	Ross Chastain	Trackhouse Racing	Chevrolet	265	7
31	29	10	Ty Dillon	Kaulig Racing	Chevrolet	265	6
32	26	47	Ricky Stenhouse Jr.	Hyak Motorsports	Chevrolet	264	5
33	27	34	Todd Gilliland	Front Row Motorsports	Ford	264	4
34	34	51	Cody Ware	Rick Ware Racing	Chevrolet	263	3
35	31	88	Connor Zilisch (R)	Trackhouse Racing	Chevrolet	262	2
36	30	38	Zane Smith	Front Row Motorsports	Ford	262	1
Official race results

=== Race statistics ===
- Lead changes: 12 among 7 different drivers
- Cautions/Laps: 4 for 21
- Red flags: 0
- Time of race: 2 hours, 43 minutes, and 4 seconds
- Average speed: 147.363 miles per hour (237.158 km/h)

== Media ==
=== Television ===
USA Sports covered the race on the television side. Leigh Diffey, Jeff Burton and Steve Letarte called the race from the broadcast booth. Trevor Bayne, Kim Coon, and Marty Snider handled pit road.

USA
Booth announcers	Pit reporters
Lap-by-lap: Leigh Diffey; Color-commentator: Jeff Burton; Color-commentator: Steve Letarte	Trevor Bayne; Kim Coon; Marty Snider

=== Radio ===
PRN had the radio call for the race, which was also simulcast on Sirius XM NASCAR Radio. Brad Gillie and Nick Yeoman called the race in the booth when the field races through the tri-oval. Andrew Kurland called the race from a billboard in turn 2 when the field races through turns 1 and 2. Pat Patterson called the race from a billboard outside of turn 3 when the field races through turns 3 and 4. Wendy Venturini, Brett McMillan, and Heather DeBeaux worked pit road for the radio side.

PRN
Booth announcers	Turn announcers	Pit reporters
Lead announcer: Brad Gillie; Announcer: Nick Yeoman	Turns 1 & 2: Andrew Kurland; Turns 3 & 4: Pat Patterson	Wendy Venturini; Brett McMillan; Heather DeBeaux

== Standings after the race ==
Drivers' Championship standings

	Pos	Driver	Points
	1	Kyle Larson	2,318
	2	Denny Hamlin	2,278 (–40)
	3	Christopher Bell	2,263 (–55)
	4	Joey Logano	2,247 (–71)
	5	Ryan Blaney	2,238 (–80)
2	6	Chase Briscoe	2,234 (–84)
	7	Tyler Reddick	2,212 (–106)
2	8	Ty Gibbs	2,208 (–110)
	9	Austin Cindric	2,190 (–128)
	10	Bubba Wallace	2,181 (–137)
	11	Carson Hocevar	2,160 (–158)
	12	William Byron	2,158 (–160)
	13	Chase Elliott	2,155 (–163)
2	14	Daniel Suárez	2,123 (–195)
	15	Chris Buescher	2,122 (–196)
2	16	Ryan Preece	2,118 (–200)
Official driver's standings

Manufacturers' Championship standings

Pos	Manufacturer	Points
1	Toyota	1,379
2	Chevrolet	1,207 (–172)
3	Ford	1,155 (–224)

- Note: Only the first 16 positions are included for the driver standings.

Previous race: 2026 Hollywood Casino 400	NASCAR Cup Series; 2026 season	Next race: 2026 Bank of America 400
