= NASCAR on The CW =

American motorsports broadcast

- Genre: Auto racing telecasts
- Directed by: TBA
- Presented by: Adam Alexander, Jamie McMurray, Parker Kligerman
- Theme music composer: TBD
- Opening theme: "Woohoo" by Jordan Baum (2024); "Only the Strong Survive" by Bryan Adams (2025-present)
- Country of origin: United States
- Original language: English
- No. of seasons: 1 (2024 NBC productions run); 7 (2025–2031 run)

Production
- Production locations: Various NASCAR racetracks (race telecasts, and pre-race shows)
- Camera setup: Multi-camera
- Running time: Pre-race: 30 minutes; Race: 2 to 5 hours (depending on race length and in-race events)
- Production companies: NBC Sports (2024 only); NASCAR Productions (2025–2031)

Original release
- Network: The CW; ESPN Unlimited
- Release: September 20, 2024 – present

NASCAR on The CW is the branding used for broadcasts of NASCAR O'Reilly Auto Parts Series races on The CW. NASCAR Productions produces the broadcasts in partnership with CW Sports. The network will broadcast the entire NASCAR O'Reilly Auto Parts Series season through 2031. The CW also broadcast the O'Reilly Series playoff races in 2024, along with regular season finale at Bristol Motor Speedway, in collaboration with NBC Sports.

== History ==
On July 28, 2023, NASCAR announced that CW Sports would gain the television broadcast rights to the Xfinity Series starting in the next television contract which would begin in 2025. Unlike the previous 2015 to 2024 television contract, where Fox and NBC shared the television rights, The CW would broadcast the full season for the series. NASCAR Productions will produce the broadcasts in-house from its new studio in Concord, North Carolina.

On April 11, 2024, NASCAR announced that The CW would air the final eight races of the 2024 NASCAR Xfinity Series season under a sublicensing agreement with NBC Sports. These telecasts would remain produced by NBC Sports, featuring NASCAR on NBC lap-by-lap commentator Rick Allen and analysts Jeff Burton and Steve Letarte.

The CW announced its 2025 coverage plans on January 14, 2025. Adam Alexander will be the lead lap-by-lap announcer, with color commentators Jamie McMurray and Parker Kligerman. Dillon Welch and Kim Coon will be featured as pit reporters. Carla Metts will host NASCAR Countdown Live before every race. In March 2025, it was revealed that select races will be called remotely from the NASCAR Productions studios in Charlotte, North Carolina. The studio being used is a purpose-built extended reality space.

Beginning on August 4, 2026, ESPN Unlimited simulcasted sports broadcasts from The CW including NASCAR races as part of a partnership between ESPN and The CW which was announced on April 29, 2026.

== Commentators ==
=== Play-by-play ===
- Adam Alexander
- Dillon Welch

=== Color commentators ===
- Jamie McMurray
- Parker Kligerman
- Denny Hamlin (Charlotte and Atlanta)
- Connor Zilisch (Nashville)
- Ross Chastain (Pocono)
- A. J. Allmendinger (Sonoma)
- Bubba Wallace (Indianapolis)

=== Pit reporters ===
- Dillon Welch
- Kim Coon
- Kyle Petty
- Heather DeBeaux
- Chris Wilner

=== Pre-race host ===
- Carla Metts
- Kim Coon (fill-in)

== Reception ==
Despite The CW's NASCAR coverage generally receiving praise from viewers, the network has been criticised for not streaming NASCAR Xfinity Series races on its app. Practice and qualifying, along with select driver cams, are available through the app as well as full replays of each race.

The CW has faced criticism for allowing some affiliates to pre-empt NASCAR Xfinity Series races for local sports. On March 8, 2025, Atlanta's WPCH-TV cut to a commercial during the final lap of a close finish at Phoenix and never returned, instead airing an NBA game between the Indiana Pacers and Atlanta Hawks. The CW later stated it had addressed the issue with the station and was assured it wouldn't happen again. A week later, WPCH-TV skipped the Las Vegas race entirely, which aired instead on the regional Peachtree Sports Network. Similar problems occurred in Detroit, where WKBD-TV pre-empted post-race coverage for a Detroit City FC soccer match and also declined to air the Las Vegas race. In that case, the CW provided access through its app with geofencing. Some fans also struggled to locate races due to recent affiliate changes, though the CW redirected them to the correct stations. On August 22, 2025, CW20 in Knoxville, TN, opted to preempt NASCAR coverage of the Xfinity Series race at Daytona International Speedway in order to broadcast a local high school football game. The race was not simulcast or broadcast on any of WVLT's other stations.

== See also ==
- NASCAR on NBC
- NASCAR on Fox
- NASCAR on Prime Video
- NASCAR on TNT Sports
