= 2026 The Great American Getaway 400 =

NASCAR Cup Series race

2026 The Great American Getaway 400 presented by VISITPA
Race details
- Race 16 of 36 in the 2026 NASCAR Cup Series
- Date: June 14, 2026
- Location: Pocono Raceway in Blakeslee, Pennsylvania
- Course: Permanent racing facility
- Course length: 2.5 miles (4.0 km)
- Distance: 160 laps, 400 mi (643.738 km)
- Average speed: 135.900 miles per hour (218.710 km/h)

Pole position
Driver	Denny Hamlin	Joe Gibbs Racing
- Time: 51.948

Most laps led
Driver	John Hunter Nemechek	Legacy Motor Club
- Laps: 42

Fastest lap
Driver	Chris Buescher	RFK Racing
- Time: 52.682

Winner
No. 11	Denny Hamlin	Joe Gibbs Racing

Television in the United States
- Network: Prime Video
- Announcers: Adam Alexander, Dale Earnhardt Jr., and Steve Letarte
- Nielsen ratings: 1.66 million

Radio in the United States
- Radio: MRN
- Booth announcers: Alex Hayden, Mike Bagley and Todd Gordon
- Turn announcers: Kyle Rickey (1), Tim Catalfamo (2), Nathan Prouty (3)

The 2026 The Great American Getaway presented by VISITPA was an NASCAR Cup Series race that was held on June 14, 2026, at Pocono Raceway in Blakeslee, Pennsylvania. Contested over 160 laps on the 2.5-mile (4.0 km) oval, it was the 16th race of the 2026 NASCAR Cup Series season.

Denny Hamlin won the race. Tyler Reddick finished 2nd, and William Byron finished 3rd. John Hunter Nemechek and Kyle Larson rounded out the top five, and Erik Jones, Chris Buescher, Ross Chastain, Ty Gibbs, and Ryan Blaney rounded out the top ten.

== Report ==
=== Background ===
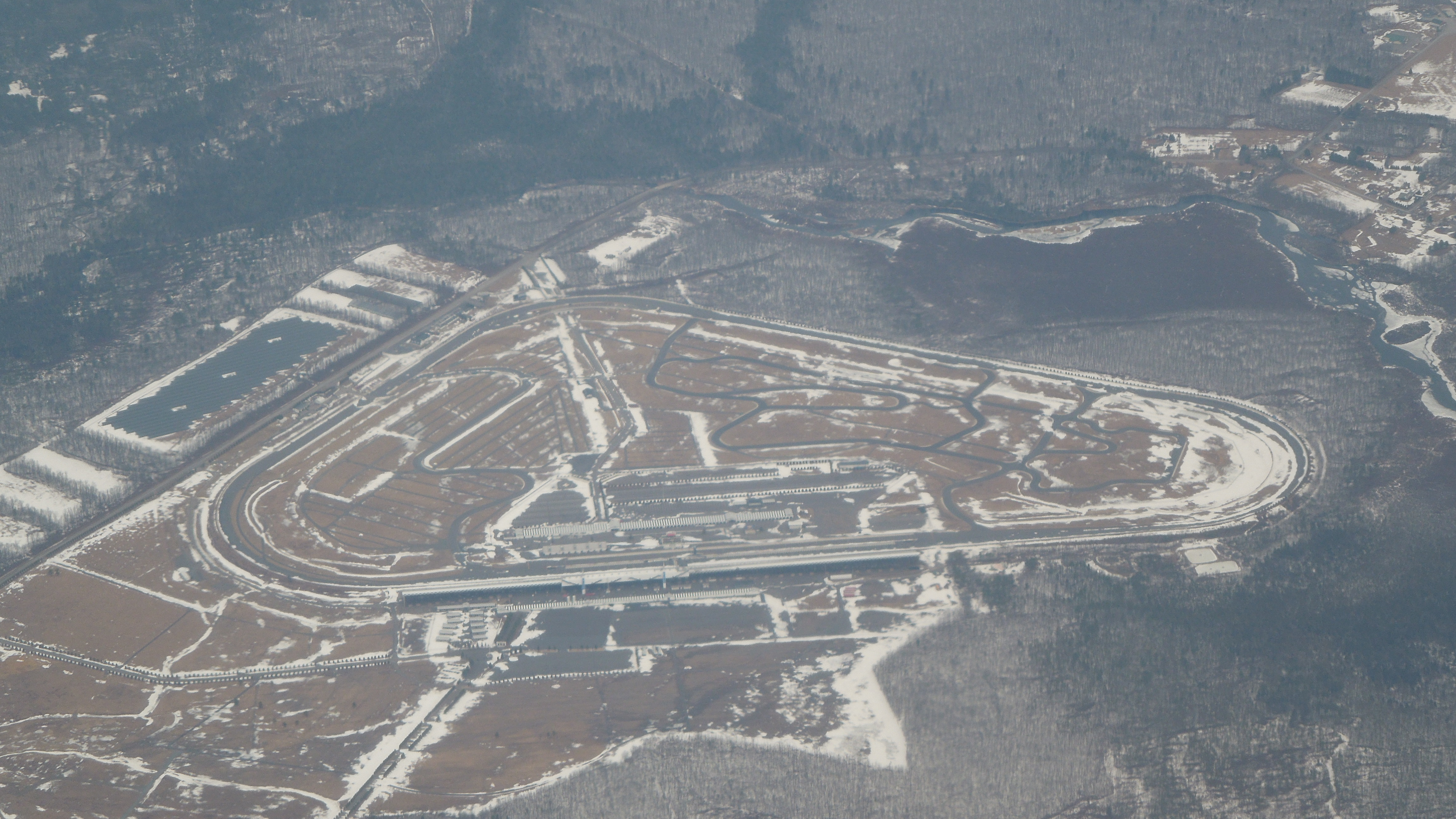
Pocono Raceway, the track where the race was held.

Pocono Raceway is a 2.5-mile (4.0 km) oval speedway located in Blakeslee, Pennsylvania, which has hosted NASCAR racing annually since the early 1970s. Nicknamed "The Tricky Triangle", the speedway has three distinct corners and is known for high speeds along its lengthy straightaways.

From 1982 to 2019, the circuit had two race weekends. In 2020, the circuit was reduced to one race. The first race was moved to World Wide Technology Raceway near St. Louis starting in 2022.

==== Entry list ====
- (R) denotes rookie driver.
- (i) denotes driver who is ineligible for series driver points.

No.	Driver	Team	Manufacturer
1	Ross Chastain	Trackhouse Racing	Chevrolet
2	Austin Cindric	Team Penske	Ford
3	Austin Dillon	Richard Childress Racing	Chevrolet
4	Noah Gragson	Front Row Motorsports	Ford
5	Kyle Larson	Hendrick Motorsports	Chevrolet
6	Brad Keselowski	RFK Racing	Ford
7	Daniel Suárez	Spire Motorsports	Chevrolet
9	Chase Elliott	Hendrick Motorsports	Chevrolet
10	Ty Dillon	Kaulig Racing	Chevrolet
11	Denny Hamlin	Joe Gibbs Racing	Toyota
12	Ryan Blaney	Team Penske	Ford
16	A. J. Allmendinger	Kaulig Racing	Chevrolet
17	Chris Buescher	RFK Racing	Ford
19	Chase Briscoe	Joe Gibbs Racing	Toyota
20	Christopher Bell	Joe Gibbs Racing	Toyota
21	Josh Berry	Wood Brothers Racing	Ford
22	Joey Logano	Team Penske	Ford
23	Bubba Wallace	23XI Racing	Toyota
24	William Byron	Hendrick Motorsports	Chevrolet
33	Austin Hill (i)	Richard Childress Racing	Chevrolet
34	Todd Gilliland	Front Row Motorsports	Ford
35	Riley Herbst	23XI Racing	Toyota
38	Zane Smith	Front Row Motorsports	Ford
41	Cole Custer	Haas Factory Team	Chevrolet
42	John Hunter Nemechek	Legacy Motor Club	Toyota
43	Erik Jones	Legacy Motor Club	Toyota
45	Tyler Reddick	23XI Racing	Toyota
47	Ricky Stenhouse Jr.	Hyak Motorsports	Chevrolet
48	Alex Bowman	Hendrick Motorsports	Chevrolet
51	Cody Ware	Rick Ware Racing	Chevrolet
54	Ty Gibbs	Joe Gibbs Racing	Toyota
60	Ryan Preece	RFK Racing	Ford
62	Casey Mears	Beard Motorsports	Chevrolet
71	Michael McDowell	Spire Motorsports	Chevrolet
77	Carson Hocevar	Spire Motorsports	Chevrolet
78	Daniel Dye (i)	Live Fast Motorsports	Chevrolet
88	Connor Zilisch (R)	Trackhouse Racing	Chevrolet
97	Shane van Gisbergen	Trackhouse Racing	Chevrolet
Official entry list

== Practice ==
Kyle Larson was the fastest in the practice session with a time of 52.722 seconds and a speed of 170.707 mph (274.726 km/h).

=== Practice results ===
Pos	No.	Driver	Team	Manufacturer	Time	Speed
1	5	Kyle Larson	Hendrick Motorsports	Chevrolet	52.722	170.707
2	11	Denny Hamlin	Joe Gibbs Racing	Toyota	52.865	170.245
3	7	Daniel Suárez	Spire Motorsports	Chevrolet	52.889	170.168
Official practice results

== Qualifying ==
Denny Hamlin scored the pole for the race with a time of 51.948 and a speed of 173.250 mph (278.819 km/h).

=== Qualifying results ===
Pos	No.	Driver	Team	Manufacturer	Time	Speed
1	11	Denny Hamlin	Joe Gibbs Racing	Toyota	51.948	173.250
2	5	Kyle Larson	Hendrick Motorsports	Chevrolet	52.003	173.067
3	7	Daniel Suárez	Spire Motorsports	Chevrolet	52.059	172.881
4	54	Ty Gibbs	Joe Gibbs Racing	Toyota	52.092	172.771
5	19	Chase Briscoe	Joe Gibbs Racing	Toyota	52.132	172.639
6	17	Chris Buescher	RFK Racing	Ford	52.176	172.493
7	43	Erik Jones	Legacy Motor Club	Toyota	52.189	172.450
8	42	John Hunter Nemechek	Legacy Motor Club	Toyota	52.277	170.160
9	24	William Byron	Hendrick Motorsports	Chevrolet	52.331	171.982
10	12	Ryan Blaney	Team Penske	Ford	52.366	171.867
11	22	Joey Logano	Team Penske	Ford	52.467	171.536
12	48	Alex Bowman	Hendrick Motorsports	Chevrolet	52.484	171.481
13	71	Michael McDowell	Spire Motorsports	Chevrolet	52.488	171.468
14	33	Austin Hill (i)	Richard Childress Racing	Chevrolet	52.537	171.308
15	41	Cole Custer	Haas Factory Team	Chevrolet	52.567	171.210
16	45	Tyler Reddick	23XI Racing	Toyota	52.568	171.207
17	2	Austin Cindric	Team Penske	Ford	52.577	171.178
18	38	Zane Smith	Front Row Motorsports	Ford	52.591	171.132
19	16	A. J. Allmendinger	Kaulig Racing	Chevrolet	52.604	171.090
20	21	Josh Berry	Wood Brothers Racing	Ford	52.627	171.015
21	47	Ricky Stenhouse Jr.	Hyak Motorsports	Chevrolet	52.656	170.921
22	20	Christopher Bell	Joe Gibbs Racing	Toyota	52.724	171.700
23	9	Chase Elliott	Hendrick Motorsports	Chevrolet	52.728	170.687
24	1	Ross Chastain	Trackhouse Racing	Chevrolet	52.730	170.681
25	35	Riley Herbst	23XI Racing	Toyota	52.818	170.396
26	77	Carson Hocevar	Spire Motorsports	Chevrolet	52.838	170.332
27	10	Ty Dillon	Kaulig Racing	Chevrolet	52.859	170.264
28	88	Connor Zilisch (R)	Trackhouse Racing	Chevrolet	52.949	169.975
29	34	Todd Gilliland	Front Row Motorsports	Ford	53.052	169.645
30	4	Noah Gragson	Front Row Motorsports	Ford	53.077	169.565
31	97	Shane van Gisbergen	Trackhouse Racing	Chevrolet	53.191	169.202
32	3	Austin Dillon	Richard Childress Racing	Chevrolet	53.214	169.128
33	51	Cody Ware	Rick Ware Racing	Chevrolet	53.488	168.262
34	78	Daniel Dye (i)	Live Fast Motorsports	Chevrolet	53.642	167.779
35	60	Ryan Preece	RFK Racing	Ford	53.721	167.532
36	62	Casey Mears	Beard Motorsports	Chevrolet	54.212	166.015
37	6	Brad Keselowski	RFK Racing	Ford	71.136	126.518
38	23	Bubba Wallace	23XI Racing	Toyota	0.000	0.000
Official qualifying results

== Race ==
=== Race results ===
==== Stage results ====
Stage One Laps: 30

Pos	No	Driver	Team	Manufacturer	Points
1	11	Denny Hamlin	Joe Gibbs Racing	Toyota	10
2	5	Kyle Larson	Hendrick Motorsports	Chevrolet	9
3	54	Ty Gibbs	Joe Gibbs Racing	Toyota	8
4	19	Chase Briscoe	Joe Gibbs Racing	Toyota	7
5	17	Chris Buescher	RFK Racing	Ford	6
6	7	Daniel Suárez	Spire Motorsports	Chevrolet	5
7	24	William Byron	Hendrick Motorsports	Chevrolet	4
8	43	Erik Jones	Legacy Motor Club	Toyota	3
9	22	Joey Logano	Team Penske	Ford	2
10	33	Austin Hill (i)	Richard Childress Racing	Chevrolet	0

Stage Two Laps: 65

Pos	No	Driver	Team	Manufacturer	Points
1	34	Todd Gilliland	Front Row Motorsports	Ford	10
2	19	Chase Briscoe	Joe Gibbs Racing	Toyota	9
3	42	John Hunter Nemechek	Legacy Motor Club	Toyota	8
4	43	Erik Jones	Legacy Motor Club	Toyota	7
5	47	Ricky Stenhouse Jr.	Hyak Motorsports	Chevrolet	6
6	1	Ross Chastain	Trackhouse Racing	Chevrolet	5
7	77	Carson Hocevar	Spire Motorsports	Chevrolet	4
8	7	Daniel Suárez	Spire Motorsports	Chevrolet	3
9	11	Denny Hamlin	Joe Gibbs Racing	Toyota	2
10	9	Chase Elliott	Hendrick Motorsports	Chevrolet	1

=== Final Stage results ===
Stage Three Laps: 65

Pos	Grid	No	Driver	Team	Manufacturer	Laps	Points
1	1	11	Denny Hamlin	Joe Gibbs Racing	Toyota	160	67
2	16	45	Tyler Reddick	23XI Racing	Toyota	160	35
3	9	24	William Byron	Hendrick Motorsports	Chevrolet	160	38
4	8	42	John Hunter Nemechek	Legacy Motor Club	Toyota	160	41
5	2	5	Kyle Larson	Hendrick Motorsports	Chevrolet	160	41
6	7	43	Erik Jones	Legacy Motor Club	Toyota	160	41
7	6	17	Chris Buescher	RFK Racing	Ford	160	37
8	24	1	Ross Chastain	Trackhouse Racing	Chevrolet	160	34
9	4	54	Ty Gibbs	Joe Gibbs Racing	Toyota	160	36
10	10	12	Ryan Blaney	Team Penske	Ford	160	27
11	23	9	Chase Elliott	Hendrick Motorsports	Chevrolet	160	27
12	5	19	Chase Briscoe	Joe Gibbs Racing	Toyota	160	41
13	3	7	Daniel Suárez	Spire Motorsports	Chevrolet	160	32
14	17	2	Austin Cindric	Team Penske	Ford	160	23
15	21	47	Ricky Stenhouse Jr.	Hyak Motorsports	Chevrolet	160	28
16	25	35	Riley Herbst	23XI Racing	Toyota	160	21
17	13	71	Michael McDowell	Spire Motorsports	Chevrolet	160	20
18	14	33	Austin Hill (i)	Richard Childress Racing	Chevrolet	160	0
19	29	34	Todd Gilliland	Front Row Motorsports	Ford	160	28
20	26	77	Carson Hocevar	Spire Motorsports	Chevrolet	160	21
21	38	23	Bubba Wallace	23XI Racing	Toyota	160	16
22	19	16	A. J. Allmendinger	Kaulig Racing	Chevrolet	160	15
23	28	88	Connor Zilisch (R)	Trackhouse Racing	Chevrolet	160	14
24	15	41	Cole Custer	Haas Factory Team	Chevrolet	160	13
25	32	3	Austin Dillon	Richard Childress Racing	Chevrolet	160	12
26	22	20	Christopher Bell	Joe Gibbs Racing	Toyota	160	11
27	12	48	Alex Bowman	Hendrick Motorsports	Chevrolet	160	10
28	35	60	Ryan Preece	RFK Racing	Ford	160	9
29	34	78	Daniel Dye (i)	Live Fast Motorsports	Chevrolet	159	0
30	33	51	Cody Ware	Rick Ware Racing	Chevrolet	159	7
31	31	97	Shane van Gisbergen	Trackhouse Racing	Chevrolet	158	6
32	27	10	Ty Dillon	Kaulig Racing	Chevrolet	158	5
33	20	21	Josh Berry	Wood Brothers Racing	Ford	157	4
34	11	22	Joey Logano	Team Penske	Ford	156	5
35	30	4	Noah Gragson	Front Row Motorsports	Chevrolet	107	2
36	36	62	Casey Mears	Beard Motorsports	Chevrolet	105	1
37	18	38	Zane Smith	Front Row Motorsports	Ford	66	1
38	37	6	Brad Keselowski	RFK Racing	Ford	46	1
Official race results

=== Race statistics ===
- Lead changes: 17 among 11 different drivers
- Cautions/Laps: 5 for 23 laps
- Red flags: 0
- Time of race: 2 hours, 56 minutes, and 36 seconds
- Average speed: 135.900 miles per hour (218.710 km/h)

== Media ==
=== Television ===
Prime Video covered the race on the television side. Adam Alexander, Dale Earnhardt Jr. and Steve Letarte called the race from the broadcast booth. Kim Coon, Marty Snider, and Trevor Bayne handled pit road for the television side.

Prime Video
Booth announcers	Pit reporters
Lap-by-lap: Adam Alexander; Color-commentator: Dale Earnhardt Jr. Color-commentator: Steve Letarte	Kim Coon; Marty Snider; Trevor Bayne

=== Radio ===
Radio coverage of the race was broadcast by Motor Racing Network (MRN) and simulcast on Sirius XM NASCAR Radio. Alex Hayden, Mike Bagley and former championship Crew Chief Todd Gordon called the race in the booth while the field raced on the front stretch. Kyle Rickey called the race from a billboard outside of turn 2 when the field was racing through turn 1. Tim Catafalmo called the race from a platform outside of turn 2 when the field races through turn 2. Nathan Prouty called the race from a billboard in the middle of Turn 3. Lead MRN Radio Pit Reporter Steve Post, Chris Wilner and Jason Toy were the pit reporters during the broadcast.

MRN Radio
Booth announcers	Turn announcers	Pit reporters
Lead announcer: Alex Hayden; Announcer: Mike Bagley; Announcer: Todd Gordon	Turn 1: Kyle Rickey; Turn 2: Tim Catafalmo; Turn 3: Nathan Prouty	Steve Post; Chris Wilner; Jason Toy

== Standings after the race ==
Drivers' Championship standings

	Pos	Driver	Points
	1	Tyler Reddick	704
	2	Denny Hamlin	685 (–19)
	3	Ryan Blaney	539 (–165)
	4	Chase Elliott	509 (–195)
	5	Ty Gibbs	506 (–198)
	6	Kyle Larson	494 (–210)
1	7	Chris Buescher	461 (–243)
1	8	Daniel Suárez	450 (–254)
2	9	Carson Hocevar	449 (–255)
	10	Christopher Bell	421 (–283)
1	11	William Byron	415 (–289)
1	12	Chase Briscoe	411 (–293)
2	13	Bubba Wallace	394 (–310)
	14	Shane van Gisbergen	361 (–343)
3	15	Erik Jones	355 (–349)
	16	Austin Cindric	355 (–349)
Official driver's standings

Manufacturers' Championship standings

Pos	Manufacturer	Points
1	Toyota	747
2	Chevrolet	650 (–97)
3	Ford	528 (–219)

- Note: Only the first 16 positions are included for the driver standings.

Previous race: 2026 FireKeepers Casino 400	NASCAR Cup Series; 2026 season	Next race: 2026 Anduril 250
