= NASCAR on USA Sports =

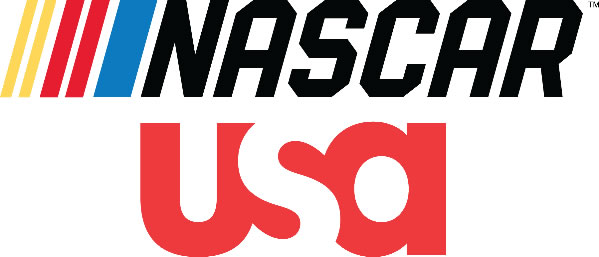
- Also known as: NASCAR on USA
- Genre: Auto racing telecasts
- Presented by: Leigh Diffey; Jeff Burton; Steve Letarte; (for other reporters and former staff, see commentators section below)
- Country of origin: United States
- Original language: English

Production
- Production location: Various NASCAR venues
- Camera setup: Multi-camera
- Running time: 4 hours or until race ended (including commercials)
- Production companies: CBS Sports (1982–1985); NBC Sports (2016, 2022–2025); USA Sports (2026–present)

Original release
- Network: USA Network
- Release: February 11, 1982 – 1985
- Release: August 17, 2016
- Network: USA Network; NBC; Peacock
- Release: June 26, 2022 – October 12, 2025
- Network: USA Network; NBC; Peacock
- Release: August 9, 2026 – present

Related
- NASCAR on CBS; NASCAR on NBC; NASCAR on Fox; NASCAR on TNT Sports; NASCAR on Prime Video

NASCAR on USA Sports is the branding used for broadcasts of NASCAR Cup Series races that are produced by USA Sports and televised on the USA Network and NBC in the United States. The network originally aired races from 1982 to 1985. In 2016, and from 2022 to 2024, the network aired Cup Series and Xfinity Series races produced by NBC Sports, typically in the second half of the season.

== History ==
=== Coverage of the Twin 125's race ===
From 1982 to 1984, USA Network broadcast the UNO Twin 125s (now the Bluegreen Vacations Duel). USA used CBS' crew, graphics and announcers.

USA also aired the Atlanta ARCA race in 1985 and televised several NASCAR Busch Series races in the late 1980s.

=== In relation with NASCAR on NBC ===
On January 26, 2016, NASCAR announced that the Cheez-It 355 at the Glen from Watkins Glen International would air on USA Network due to NBC and NBCSN's commitments to the Summer Olympics.

With NBCSN closing at the conclusion of 2021, USA Network became the new NASCAR cable TV broadcaster for the NBC half. The network is scheduled to air 11 NASCAR Cup Series races and 15 NASCAR Xfinity Series races in 2022.

On November 12, 2025, USA Sports would be reformed by Versant, formed after NBCUniversal spun off most of their cable business. USA Sports would receive NBC's portion of the Cup Series schedule beginning in 2026. For that year, USA will air 10 of the races, while the broadcasts for the summer Daytona race and the final three races of the season (the YellaWood 500 and the Xfinity 500), including the Cup Series Championship, would still air on NBC but be produced by USA Sports.

== Commentators ==
=== Broadcast booth ===
==== Lap-by-lap announcers ====
- Leigh Diffey – 2015–2017, 2024–present

==== Color commentators ====
- Jeff Burton – 2015–present
- Steve Letarte – 2015–present

=== Pre-race and post-race shows ===
- Marty Snider – pre and post-race show host (2021–present)
- Dale Jarrett – rotating analyst (2015–present)
- Brad Daugherty – rotating analyst (2020–present)

=== Pit reporters ===
- Trevor Bayne (2025–present)
- Dave Burns (2000–2006, 2015–present)
- Kim Coon (2022–present)
- Marty Snider (1999–2006, 2015–present)

=== Former ===
- Rick Allen – lap-by-lap announcer (2015–2024)
- Mike Bagley – commentator for the radio-style broadcasts on road courses (2017–2019, 2021–2024)
- Allen Bestwick – lap-by-lap announcer/pit reporter (1999–2006)
- Ato Boldon – roving reporter (2017)
- Ricky Carmichael – guest color commentator at Darlington only (2021)
- Landon Cassill – fill-in pit reporter, Xfinity Series standalone races (2018)
- Jac Collinsworth – pre-race show host/roving reporter (2021)
- Bob Costas – guest host for pre-race show at Cup race at Homestead only (2017)
- Lindsay Czarniak – pit reporter (2005–2006)
- Wally Dallenbach Jr. – color analyst (2001–2006)
- Dale Earnhardt Jr. – color analyst (2018–2023)
- Carl Edwards – guest color commentator at Richmond only (2015)
- Brendan Gaughan – fill-in pit reporter, Xfinity Series standalone races (2018)
- Joe Gibbs – color commentator (1999)
- Alex Hayden – fill-in pit reporter, Xfinity Series standalone races (2015–2016)
- Jesse Iwuji – pit reporter for Cup and Xfinity Series at Daytona in July only (2019) and select Xfinity Series races (2020)
- Ned Jarrett – guest color commentator at Darlington only (2015–2017)
- Parker Kligerman – pit reporter (2015–2025)
- Carolyn Manno – NASCAR Victory Lap host (2015–2018)
- Mike Massaro – pit reporter (1999-2000; 2015–2016)
- Jamie McMurray – guest color commentator at Chicagoland only (2015)
- Jim Noble – fill-in pit reporter, Xfinity Series standalone races (2015–2016)
- Benny Parsons – color commentator (2000–2006)
- Kyle Petty – rotating analyst (2015–2025)
- Dorsey Schroeder – pit reporter (1999)
- Ken Squier – guest lap-by-lap announcer at Darlington only (2015–2017) (deceased)
- Kelli Stavast – pit reporter (2015–2021)
- Mike Tirico – guest host for pre-race show at Cup race at Daytona in July only (2018), Indianapolis in July only (2020)
- Danielle Trotta - NASCAR Victory Lap host (2019)
- Krista Voda – pre and post-race show host (2015–2020)
- Mike Wallace – color commentator (1999)
- Bill Weber – host/pit reporter/lap-by-lap announcer (2001–2006) (deceased)
- Brian Williams – host (1999)
- Rutledge Wood – roving/specialty reporter (2015–2022)
- Dillon Welch – pit reporter (2018–2025)

Preceded by NBCSN	NASCAR pay television carrier (with NBC) in the United States; 2022–present	Succeeded by Incumbent
