= 1966 World 600 =

Auto race held at Charlotte Motor Speedway in 1966

Race details
- Race 20 of 49 in the 1966 NASCAR Grand National Series season
- 1966 World 600 program cover
- Date: May 22, 1966
- Location: Charlotte Motor Speedway, Concord, North Carolina
- Course: Permanent racing facility
- Course length: 1.5 miles (2.4 km)
- Distance: 400 laps, 600 mi (965.606 km)
- Average speed: 135.042 mph (217.329 km/h)

Pole position
- Driver: Richard Petty

Most laps led
- Driver: David Pearson
- Laps: 134

Winner
- No. 42: Marvin Panch

The 1966 World 600, the 7th running of the event, was a NASCAR Grand National Series race held on May 22, 1966, at Charlotte Motor Speedway in Charlotte, North Carolina. Contested over 400 laps on the 1.5 mile (2.4 km) speedway, it was the 20th race of the 1966 NASCAR Grand National Series season.

Marvin Panch of Petty Enterprises would win his final NASCAR Grand National Series race while Gene Cline would retire from professional stock car racing after the race was over. When Buddy Baker suffered a blown engine during the 44th lap, he was setting a pace of 145.291 miles per hour or 233.823 kilometres per hour; speeds that were unprecedented during the late 1960s.

== Background ==
Charlotte Motor Speedway is a motorsports complex located in Concord, North Carolina, United States, 13 miles from Charlotte, North Carolina. The complex features a 1.5 miles (2.4 km) quad oval track that hosts NASCAR racing including the prestigious World 600 on Memorial Day weekend and the National 500. Bruton Smith established the speedway in 1959, and it is considered NASCAR's home track, with many race teams based in the Charlotte region. Speedway Motorsports Inc. owns and operates the track. (SMI).

=== Final results ===
Fin	St	#	Driver	Make	Laps	Led	Status
1	7	42	Marvin Panch	'65 Plymouth	400	99	running
2	20	49	G. C. Spencer	'65 Plymouth	398		running
3	19	31	Don White	'66 Dodge	394		running
4	18	48	James Hylton	'65 Dodge	391		running
5	37	87	Neil Castles	'66 Oldsmobile	371		running
6	32	86	Paul Connors	'64 Dodge	370		running
7	40	34	Wendell Scott	'65 Ford	370		running
8	22	11	Ned Jarrett	'66 Ford	362		engine
9	29	93	Blackie Watt	'64 Ford	351		running
10	13	88	Buck Baker	'66 Chevrolet	348		running
11	28	46	Roy Mayne	'66 Chevrolet	333		engine
12	34	68	Larry Manning	'65 Plymouth	322		engine
13	42	20	Clyde Lynn	'64 Ford	313		engine
14	17	99	Paul Goldsmith	'66 Plymouth	303	112	engine
15	3	71	Earl Balmer	'65 Dodge	301	3	engine
16	44	53	Jimmy Helms	'64 Ford	297		running
17	4	6	David Pearson	'66 Dodge	295	134	crash
18	39	95	Gene Cline	'64 Ford	291		running
19	15	67	Buddy Arrington	'64 Dodge	273		engine
20	33	72	Bill Champion	'64 Ford	256		oil leak
21	2	14	Jim Paschal	'66 Plymouth	240	7	engine
22	1	43	Richard Petty	'66 Plymouth	236	6	engine
23	26	18	Stick Elliott	'66 Chevrolet	236		engine
24	27	4	John Sears	'64 Ford	157		engine
25	12	64	Elmo Langley	'64 Ford	144		crash
26	11	55	Tiny Lund	'64 Ford	140		engine
27	14	90	Sonny Hutchins	'64 Ford	129		engine
28	38	38	Wayne Smith	'66 Chevrolet	122		axle
29	6	98	Sam McQuagg	'66 Dodge	112		engine
30	30	73	Earl Brooks	'64 Ford	92		engine
31	21	79	Frank Warren	'64 Chevrolet	89		engine
32	25	59	Tom Pistone	'64 Ford	84		transmission
33	31	5	Harold Smith	'64 Ford	76		engine
34	23	36	H. B. Bailey	'66 Pontiac	70		engine
35	36	06	Jack Lawrence	'64 Mercury	63		engine
36	10	1	Paul Lewis	'65 Plymouth	54	3	crash
37	5	3	Buddy Baker	'65 Dodge	51	36	engine
38	43	96	Sonny Lamphear	'64 Ford	29		driveshaft
39	9	16	Darel Dieringer	'66 Mercury	21		differential
40	35	19	J. T. Putney	'66 Chevrolet	20		engine
41	8	24	Curtis Turner	'66 Ford	19		engine
42	41	74	Gene Black	'64 Ford	6		engine
43	16	22	Bobby Allison	'65 Chevrolet	3		engine
44	24	33	Joel Davis	'66 Chevrolet	1		gas tank
