= 1971 Nashville 420 =

Auto race held at Fairgrounds Speedway in 1971

Race details
- Race 32 of 48 in the 1971 NASCAR Winston Cup Series season
- Date: July 24, 1971
- Official name: Nashville 420
- Location: Fairgrounds Speedway, Nashville, Tennessee
- Course: Permanent racing facility
- Course length: 0.596 miles (0.959 km)
- Distance: 420 laps, 250.3 mi (402.8 km)
- Weather: Warm with temperatures of 80.1 °F (26.7 °C); wind speeds of 11.1 miles per hour (17.9 km/h)
- Average speed: 89.667 miles per hour (144.305 km/h)

Pole position
Driver	Richard Petty	Petty Enterprises

Most laps led
Driver	Richard Petty	Petty Enterprises
- Laps: 400

Winner
No. 43	Richard Petty	Petty Enterprises

Television in the United States
- Network: untelevised
- Announcers: none

The 1971 Nashville 420 was a NASCAR Winston Cup Series event that took place on July 24, 1971, at Nashville Speedway in Nashville, Tennessee.

== Background ==
Nashville Speedway was converted to a half-mile paved oval in 1957, when it began to be a NASCAR series track. The speedway was lengthened between the 1969 and 1970 seasons. The corners were cut down from 35 degrees to their present 18 degrees in 1972.

== Race report ==
It took two hours and forty-seven minutes to complete 420 laps of racing at a paved oval track spanning 0.596 miles (0.959 km). Richard Petty qualified for the race with a pole position speed of 114.628 miles per hour (184.476 km/h) and won it with an average speed of 89.667 miles per hour (144.305 km/h). He defeated James Hylton by more than four laps in his 1971 Plymouth Roadrunner machine.

Dale Inman would be credited as the winning crew chief for this race. Other crew chiefs that were important to the race were Vic Ballard and Lee Gordon. Ten thousand people would watch two lead changes and four cautions for 46 laps.

Earl Brooks would make his best career finish with a fourth-place performance; he experienced tire problems as the race progressed and was unable to lead a lap. Brooks' team only had top 10s in 12% of its races, but 11% of their total top 10s came in this race.

All 29 of these competitors were American-born males. Other notable names include future car owner Richard Childress, Sterling Marlin's father Coo Coo, Elmo Langley, and Bobby Allison (one of the famous Allison brothers of NASCAR history). The total purse for this racing event was $20,980 ($162,194 when adjusted for inflation).

Richard Petty received $4,325 ($33,580 when adjusted for inflation) for his well-deserved victory while last-place finisher Dick May only received $215 ($1,669 when adjusted for inflation).

=== Qualifying ===
Grid	No.	Driver	Manufacturer
1	43	Richard Petty	'70 Plymouth
2	12	Bobby Allison	'70 Dodge
3	24	Cecil Gordon	'69 Mercury
4	64	Elmo Langley	'71 Ford
5	7	Dean Dalton	'69 Ford
6	8	Ed Negre	'69 Ford
7	70	J.D. McDuffie	'69 Mercury
8	76	Ben Arnold	'69 Ford
9	72	Benny Parsons	'70 Mercury
10	48	James Hylton	'70 Ford
11	26	Earl Brooks	'69 Ford
12	05	David Sisco	'70 Chevrolet
13	10	Bill Champion	'70 Ford
14	38	Wayne Smith	'69 Chevrolet
15	58	Robert Brown	'70 Chevrolet
16	74	Bill Shirey	'69 Plymouth
17	40	D.K. Ulrich	'70 Ford
18	96	Richard Childress	'70 Chevrolet
19	23	Jabe Thomas	'69 Plymouth
20	41	Ken Meisenhelder	'69 Chevrolet
21	73	Jerry Churchill	'69 Ford
22	07	Coo Coo Marlin	'69 Chevrolet
23	67	Dick May	'69 Ford
24	79	Frank Warren	'69 Dodge
25	30	Walter Ballard	'71 Ford
26	34	Wendell Scott	'69 Ford
27	28	Bill Hollar	'69 Ford
28	25	Bill Seifert	'70 Plymouth
29	19	Henley Gray	'69 Ford

== Finishing order ==
1. Richard Petty (No. 43)
2. James Hylton† (No. 48)
3. Benny Parsons† (No. 72)
4. Earl Brooks† (No. 26)
5. J.D. McDuffie† (No. 70)
6. Walter Ballard (No. 30)
7. Jabe Thomas† (No. 23)
8. Henley Gray (No. 19)
9. Ben Arnold (No. 76)
10. Bill Hollar† (No. 28)
11. Ed Negre*† (No. 8)
12. Ken Meisenhelder (No. 41)
13. Dean Dalton* (No. 7)
14. Jerry Churchill† (No. 73)
15. Frank Warren (No. 79)
16. Cecil Gordon† (No. 24)
17. Elmo Langley*† (No. 64)
18. Bill Champion*† (No. 10)
19. David Sisco*† (No. 05)
20. Wendell Scott*† (No. 34)
21. Richard Childress* (No. 96)
22. Bill Shirey* (No. 74)
23. Robert Brown* (No. 58)
24. D.K. Ulrich* (No. 40)
25. Coo Coo Marlin*† (No. 07)
26. Wayne Smith* (No. 38)
27. Bobby Allison* (No. 12)
28. Bill Seifert* (No. 25)
29. Dick May* (No. 67)

† signifies that the driver is known to be deceased
* Driver failed to finish race

Preceded by 1971 Northern 300	NASCAR Winston Cup Season; 1971	Succeeded by 1971 Dixie 500

Preceded by 1971 Northern 300	Richard Petty's Career Wins; 1960-1984	Succeeded by 1971 Dixie 500
