= NASCAR on Prime Video =

NASCAR television partnership with Amazon Prime

- Genre: Auto racing telecasts
- Directed by: Sean Owens
- Presented by: Adam Alexander; Dale Earnhardt Jr.; Steve Letarte
- Theme music composer: John Fogerty; Eric Church
- Opening theme: "Up Around the Bend" by Creedence Clearwater Revival (covered by John Fogerty and Eric Church)
- Country of origin: United States
- Original language: English
- No. of seasons: 7 (2025–2031 run)

Production
- Production locations: Various NASCAR racetracks (race telecasts, and pre-race shows)
- Camera setup: Multi-camera
- Running time: Pre-race: 30 minutes; Race: 2.5 to 5 hours (depending on race length)
- Production companies: Amazon Fox Sports (practice & qualifying sessions up until the Coca-Cola 600) USA Sports

Original release
- Network: Amazon Prime Video
- Release: May 25, 2025 – present

NASCAR on Prime Video is the branding for NASCAR races broadcast on Amazon Prime Video. Amazon Prime begin airing events beginning with the 2025 NASCAR Cup Series season.

== History ==
On November 29, 2023, NASCAR announced that Amazon would gain the broadcast rights to five Cup Series races on their Prime Video subscription video on-demand streaming service starting in 2025. The first race each season will be the Coca-Cola 600. In addition, they gained the broadcast rights for all practice and qualifying sessions in the first half of the Cup Series season with the exception of the Busch Light Clash, the Daytona 500, and the All-Star Race which NASCAR on Fox would keep. NASCAR will also work with Amazon to create a documentary on their Garage 56 entry in the 2023 24 Hours of Le Mans and a four-part documentary about Dale Earnhardt.

NASCAR announced that they would hold a mid-season bracket challenge for Cup Series teams. The top 32 drivers from Prime Video's final three races will be seeded in the tournament bracket based on their finishes in those races. The driver who wins the bracket challenge will win $1,000,000.

On November 18, 2024, it was announced that Adam Alexander, who was previously the play-by-play for Fox's Xfinity Series coverage from 2015 to 2024, would move over to Amazon's coverage as well as TNT's, reuniting with TNT after previously being their Cup Series play-by-play from 2010 to 2014. Dale Earnhardt Jr., whose contract with NASCAR on NBC expired after the 2023 season, will be a color commentator for Amazon and TNT alongside current NASCAR on NBC color commentator Steve Letarte. Earnhardt Jr. and Letarte previously worked together in the booth at NBC and as driver and crew chief at Hendrick Motorsports.

== Production ==
Each broadcast is being produced in 1080p high definition with HDR, and low latency streaming; NBC Sports is providing Amazon with technical support for the production, including use of some of its Game Creek Video mobile production trucks. Amazon is employing over 70 cameras, including pit box cameras and camera drones.

Some aspects of Amazon's coverage were influenced by its Thursday Night Football coverage, including the format of its pre- and post-race shows, and plans for analytics-based features on-air, as well as AI-driven features such as "Key Moments" and "Rapid Recap" to generate highlights packages for races a viewer joins in-progress. Amazon stated that it would use a side-by-side presentation for commercials during green-flag racing.

== On-air staff ==
=== Broadcast booth ===
==== Lap-by-lap announcer ====
- Adam Alexander

==== Color commentators ====
- Dale Earnhardt Jr.
- Steve Letarte

==== Host ====
- Danielle Trotta

==== Analyst ====
- Corey LaJoie
- Carl Edwards
- Mark Martin (Pre/post-race Nashville)
- Martin Truex Jr. (Pre/post-race Michigan)
- Brad Keselowski (Pre/post-race Pocono)
- Jeff Gordon (Pre-race Coronado Street Course)

==== Pit reporters ====
- Trevor Bayne
- Kim Coon
- Marty Snider

== See also ==
- NASCAR on NBC
- NASCAR on Fox
- NASCAR on TNT Sports
- NASCAR on The CW
- Earnhardt (2025)
- Kyle Larson vs. The Double (2026)
