= List of Daytona 500 winners =

Three-time race winner Jeff Gordon leads the field to the start of the 2015 Daytona 500.

The Daytona 500 is an annual American stock car race sanctioned by the National Association for Stock Car Auto Racing (NASCAR) and held every February at the Daytona International Speedway in Daytona Beach, Florida. It was first held in 1959 after NASCAR founder Bill France Sr. wanted to take the sanctioning body away from the Daytona Beach and Road Course and onto a permanent racing facility to allow NASCAR races to continue being held in Daytona Beach. The event is the premier and final race of the three-week Speedweeks series of races and has been the first points-paying round of the NASCAR Cup Series since 1982. It usually covers 200 laps over a total distance of 500 mi (800 km), but accidents and other incidents have meant that the race has been extended through the use of overtime rules on 13 occasions. Each winning driver is presented with a replica of the Harley J. Earl Trophy in Victory Lane, an estimated $2.5 million in prize money, (Note: Since the introduction of the Charter System in 2016, the Daytona 500 winner's share of the total prize money has not been published.) a championship ring as well as a black leather jacket, and their car is put on display in race-winning condition in the Motorsports Hall of Fame of America museum adjacent to the track for 12 months until the following year's Daytona 500.

In the 68 editions of the Daytona 500 that have occurred as of the 2026 race, 44 different drivers have won. The winner of the first race was Lee Petty in 1959, and the most recent victor was Tyler Reddick in 2026. Richard Petty holds the record for the most victories with seven, with Cale Yarborough in second place with four wins. Five drivers have won the event twice in a row, but no one has won three or more consecutively. Trevor Bayne and Bobby Allison are the youngest and oldest Daytona 500 winners, winning at the ages of 20 years and 1 day in 2011 and 50 years, 2 months, and 11 days old in 1988, respectively. Petty also holds the distinction of having the longest time between his first and last wins, 17 years between the 1964 and 1981 races. Buddy Baker and Junior Johnson set the record for the fastest and slowest race-winning average speeds of 177.602 mph (285.823 km/h) in 1980 and 124.740 mph (200.750 km/h) in 1960, respectively. Chevrolet have won the most races as a manufacturer with 27 since their first in 1960, followed by Ford in second with 17 victories. Hendrick Motorsports is the most successful race team with ten wins in total, followed by Petty Enterprises with nine wins.

== By year ==
Key
Icon	Tire manufacturer
F	Firestone
G	Goodyear
HO	Hoosier

Winners of the Daytona 500
Season	Race	Date	Driver	No.	Team	Model	Tire	Grid	Distance				Speed		Refs.
Season	Race	Date	Driver	No.	Team	Model	Tire	Grid	Laps	Mi	Km	Time	MPH	KPH	Refs.
1959	1959	February 22	Lee Petty (Note: Johnny Beauchamp was initially named the winner but Petty was awarded the victory three days later following analysis of newsreel footage and photographs.)	42	Petty Enterprises	Oldsmobile Super 88	F	15	200	500	804.672	3:41.22	135.521	218.100	
1960	1960	February 14	Junior Johnson	27	John Masoni	Chevrolet Impala	G	9	200	500	804.672	4:00.30	124.740	200.750	
1961	1961	February 26	Marvin Panch	20	Smokey Yunick	Pontiac Catalina	G	4	200	500	804.672	3:20:32	149.601	240.759	
1962	1962	February 18	Fireball Roberts	22	Jim Stephens	Pontiac Catalina	F	1	200	500	804.672	3:10:41	152.529	245.472	
1963	1963	February 24	Tiny Lund	21	Wood Brothers Racing	Ford Galaxie	F	12	200	500	804.672	3:17:56	151.556	243.906	
1964	1964	February 23	Richard Petty	43	Petty Enterprises	Plymouth Belvedere	G	2	200	500	804.672	3:14:23	154.334	248.376	
1965	1965 (Note: Race was shortened because of rain.)	February 14	Fred Lorenzen	28	Holman-Moody	Ford Galaxie	F	4	133	332.5	535.106	2:22:56	141.539	227.785	
1966	1966	February 27	Richard Petty	43	Petty Enterprises	Hemi Plymouth Belvedere	G	1	198	495	796.625	3:04:54	160.927	258.987	
1967	1967	February 26	Mario Andretti	11	Holman-Moody	Ford Fairlane	F	12	200	500	804.672	3:24:11	146.926	236.454	
1968	1968	February 25	Cale Yarborough	21	Wood Brothers Racing	Mercury Cyclone GT	F	1	200	500	804.672	3:23:44	143.251	230.540	
1969	1969	February 23	LeeRoy Yarbrough	98	Junior Johnson & Associates	Ford Torino Cobra	G	19	200	500	804.672	3:09:56	157.950	254.196	
1970	1970	February 22	Pete Hamilton	40	Petty Enterprises	Plymouth Superbird	G	9	200	500	804.672	3:20:32	149.601	240.759	
1971	1971	February 14	Richard Petty	43	Petty Enterprises	Plymouth Road Runner	G	5	200	500	804.672	3:27:40	144.462	232.489	
1972	1972	February 20	A. J. Foyt	21	Wood Brothers Racing	Mercury Cyclone GT	G	2	200	500	804.672	3:05:42	161.550	259.990	
1973	1973	February 18	Richard Petty	43	Petty Enterprises	Dodge Magnum Charger	G	7	200	500	804.672	3:10:50	157.205	252.997	
1974	1974 (Note: The 1973 oil crisis shortened the event by 20 laps.)	February 17	Richard Petty	43	Petty Enterprises	Dodge Magnum Charger	G	2	180	450	724.205	3:11:38	140.894	226.747	
1975	1975	February 16	Benny Parsons	72	L. G. DeWitt	Chevrolet Chevelle Laguna	G	32	200	500	804.672	3:15:15	153.649	247.274	
1976	1976	February 15	David Pearson	21	Wood Brothers Racing	Mercury Cyclone	G	7	200	500	804.672	3:17:08	152.181	244.912	
1977	1977	February 20	Cale Yarborough	11	Junior Johnson & Associates	Chevrolet Chevelle Laguna	G	4	200	500	804.672	3:15:48	153.218	246.580	
1978	1978	February 19	Bobby Allison	15	Bud Moore Engineering	Ford Thunderbird	G	33	200	500	804.672	3:07:49	159.730	257.061	
1979	1979	February 18	Richard Petty	43	Petty Enterprises	Oldsmobile Cutlass	G	13	200	500	804.672	3:28:22	143.977	231.709	
1980	1980	February 17	Buddy Baker	28	Ranier-Lundy	Oldsmobile Cutlass	G	1	200	500	804.672	2:48:55	177.602	285.823	
1981	1981	February 15	Richard Petty	43	Petty Enterprises	Buick Regal	G	8	200	500	804.672	2:56:50	169.651	273.027	
1982	1982	February 14	Bobby Allison	88	DiGard Motorsports	Buick Regal	G	7	200	500	804.672	3:14:49	153.991	247.824	
1983	1983	February 20	Cale Yarborough	28	Ranier-Lundy	Pontiac LeMans	G	8	200	500	804.672	3:12.20	155.979	251.024	
1984	1984	February 19	Cale Yarborough	28	Ranier-Lundy	Chevrolet Monte Carlo	G	1	200	500	804.672	3:18:41	150.994	243.001	
1985	1985	February 17	Bill Elliott	9	Melling Racing	Ford Thunderbird	G	1	200	500	804.672	2:54:09	172.265	277.234	
1986	1986	February 16	Geoff Bodine	5	Hendrick Motorsports	Chevrolet Monte Carlo	G	2	200	500	804.672	3:22:32	148.124	238.382	
1987	1987	February 15	Bill Elliott	9	Melling Racing	Ford Thunderbird	G	1	200	500	804.672	2:50:12	176.263	283.668	
1988	1988	February 14	Bobby Allison	12	Stavola Brothers Racing	Buick Regal	G	3	200	500	804.672	3:38:08	137.531	221.335	
1989	1989	February 19	Darrell Waltrip	17	Hendrick Motorsports	Chevrolet Monte Carlo	HO	2	200	500	804.672	3:22:04	148.466	238.933	
1990	1990	February 18	Derrike Cope	10	Whitcomb Racing	Chevrolet Lumina	G	12	200	500	804.672	3:00:59	165.761	266.766	
1991	1991	February 17	Ernie Irvan	4	Morgan–McClure Motorsports	Chevrolet Lumina	G	2	200	500	804.672	3:22:30	148.148	238.421	
1992	1992	February 16	Davey Allison	28	Robert Yates Racing	Ford Thunderbird	G	6	200	500	804.672	3:07:12	160.256	257.907	
1993	1993	February 14	Dale Jarrett	18	Joe Gibbs Racing	Chevrolet Lumina	G	2	200	500	804.672	3:13:35	154.972	249.403	
1994	1994	February 20	Sterling Marlin	4	Morgan–McClure Motorsports	Chevrolet Lumina	G	4	200	500	804.672	3:11:10	156.931	252.556	
1995	1995	February 19	Sterling Marlin	4	Morgan–McClure Motorsports	Chevrolet Monte Carlo	G	3	200	500	804.672	3:31:42	141.710	228.060	
1996	1996	February 18	Dale Jarrett	88	Robert Yates Racing	Ford Thunderbird	G	7	200	500	804.672	3:14:25	154.308	248.335	
1997	1997	February 16	Jeff Gordon	24	Hendrick Motorsports	Chevrolet Monte Carlo	G	6	200	500	804.672	3:22:18	148.295	238.658	
1998	1998	February 15	Dale Earnhardt	3	Richard Childress Racing	Chevrolet Monte Carlo	G	4	200	500	804.672	2:53:42	172.712	277.953	
1999	1999	February 14	Jeff Gordon	24	Hendrick Motorsports	Chevrolet Monte Carlo	G	1	200	500	804.672	3:05:42	161.551	259.991	
2000	2000	February 20	Dale Jarrett	88	Robert Yates Racing	Ford Taurus	G	1	200	500	804.672	3:12:43	155.669	250.525	
2001	2001	February 18	Michael Waltrip	15	Dale Earnhardt, Inc.	Chevrolet Monte Carlo	G	19	200	500	804.672	3:05:26	161.783	260.365	
2002	2002	February 17	Ward Burton	22	Bill Davis Racing	Dodge Intrepid	G	19	200	500	804.672	3:29:50	142.971	230.090	
2003	2003	February 16	Michael Waltrip	15	Dale Earnhardt, Inc.	Chevrolet Monte Carlo	G	4	109	272.5	438.546	2:02:08	133.870	215.443	
2004	2004	February 15	Dale Earnhardt Jr.	8	Dale Earnhardt, Inc.	Chevrolet Monte Carlo	G	3	200	500	804.672	3:11:53	156.345	251.613	
2005	2005 (Note: Extended because of overtime rules.)	February 20	Jeff Gordon	24	Hendrick Motorsports	Chevrolet Monte Carlo	G	15	203	507.5	816.742	3:45:16	135.173	217.540	
2006	2006	February 19	Jimmie Johnson	48	Hendrick Motorsports	Chevrolet Monte Carlo	G	9	203	507.5	816.742	3:33:26	142.667	229.600	
2007	2007	February 18	Kevin Harvick	29	Richard Childress Racing	Chevrolet Monte Carlo	G	34	202	505	812.719	3:22:55	149.333	240.328	
2008	2008	February 17	Ryan Newman	12	Penske Racing	Dodge Charger	G	7	200	500	804.672	3:16:30	152.672	245.702	
2009	2009	February 15	Matt Kenseth	17	Roush Fenway Racing	Ford Fusion	G	43 (Note: Kenseth qualified 39th but he started from 43rd because he changed into a backup car after crashing in the 2009 Gatorade Duels.)	152	380	611.551	2:51:40	132.816	213.747	
2010	2010	February 14	Jamie McMurray	1	Earnhardt Ganassi Racing	Chevrolet Impala	G	13	208	520	836.859	3:47:16	137.284	220.937	
2011	2011	February 20	Trevor Bayne	21	Wood Brothers Racing	Ford Fusion	G	32	208	520	836.859	3:59:24	130.326	209.739	
2012	2012	February 27–28 (Note: Rain caused the race to be rescheduled to the following day.)	Matt Kenseth	17	Roush Fenway Racing	Ford Fusion	G	4	202	505	812.719	3:36:02	140.256	225.720	
2013	2013	February 24	Jimmie Johnson	48	Hendrick Motorsports	Chevrolet SS	G	9	200	500	804.672	3:08:23	159.250	256.288	
2014	2014	February 23	Dale Earnhardt Jr.	88	Hendrick Motorsports	Chevrolet SS	G	9	200	500	804.672	3:26:29	145.290	233.822	
2015	2015	February 22	Joey Logano	22	Team Penske	Ford Fusion	G	5	203	507.5	816.742	3:08.02	161.939	260.616	
2016	2016	February 21	Denny Hamlin	11	Joe Gibbs Racing	Toyota Camry	G	11	200	500	804.672	3:10:25	157.549	253.551	
2017	2017	February 26	Kurt Busch	41	Stewart–Haas Racing	Ford Fusion	G	8	200	500	804.672	3:29:31	143.187	230.437	
2018	2018	February 18	Austin Dillon	3	Richard Childress Racing	Chevrolet Camaro ZL1	G	14	207	517.5	832.836	3:26:15	150.545	242.279	
2019	2019	February 17	Denny Hamlin	11	Joe Gibbs Racing	Toyota Camry	G	10	207	517.5	832.836	3:45:55	137.440	221.188	
2020	2020	February 16–17	Denny Hamlin	11	Joe Gibbs Racing	Toyota Camry	G	39 (Note: Hamlin qualified 21st but started from 39th because his car failed two inspections.)	209	522.5	840.882	3:42:10	141.110	227.095	
2021	2021	February 14	Michael McDowell	34	Front Row Motorsports	Ford Mustang	G	17	200	500	804.672	3:27:44	144.416	232.415	
2022	2022	February 20	Austin Cindric	2	Team Penske	Ford Mustang	G	5	201	502.5	808.695	3:31:53	142.295	229.002	
2023	2023	February 19	Ricky Stenhouse Jr.	47	JTG Daugherty Racing	Chevrolet Camaro ZL1	G	31	212	530	853.174	3:38:53	145.283	233.810	
2024	2024	February 19	William Byron	24	Hendrick Motorsports	Chevrolet Camaro ZL1	G	18	200	500	804.672	3:10:52	157.178	252.953	
2025	2025	February 16	William Byron	24	Hendrick Motorsports	2024 Chevrolet (Note: Only generic Chevrolet branding in 2025.)	G	5	201	502.5	808.695	3:53:26	129.159	207.861	
2026	2026	February 15	Tyler Reddick	45	23XI Racing	Toyota Camry	G	26	200	500	808.672	3:23:56	147.107	236.746	

== By driver ==
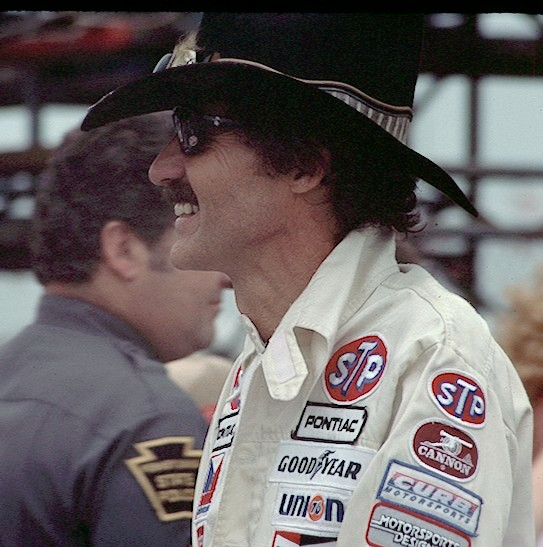
Richard Petty has won the race seven times, more than any other driver.

Multiple victories by driver
Driver	Wins	Years
Richard Petty	7	1964, 1966, 1971, 1973, 1974, 1979, 1981
Cale Yarborough	4	1968, 1977, 1983, 1984
Bobby Allison	3	1978, 1982, 1988
Dale Jarrett	3	1993, 1996, 2000
Jeff Gordon	3	1997, 1999, 2005
Denny Hamlin	3	2016, 2019, 2020
Bill Elliott	2	1985, 1987
Dale Earnhardt Jr.	2	2004, 2014
Jimmie Johnson	2	2006, 2013
Matt Kenseth	2	2009, 2012
Sterling Marlin	2	1994, 1995
Michael Waltrip	2	2001, 2003
William Byron	2	2024, 2025

== By team ==
Daytona 500s wins by team
Team	Wins	Year(s)
Hendrick Motorsports	10	1986, 1989, 1997, 1999, 2005–2006, 2013–2014, 2024–2025
Petty Enterprises	9	1959, 1964, 1966, 1970–1971, 1973–1974, 1979, 1981
Wood Brothers Racing	5	1963, 1968, 1972, 1976, 2011
Joe Gibbs Racing	4	1993, 2016, 2019–2020
Dale Earnhardt, Inc.	3	2001, 2003–2004
Morgan–McClure Motorsports	3	1991, 1994–1995
Rainer–Lundy	3	1980, 1983–1984
Richard Childress Racing	3	1998, 2007, 2018
Robert Yates Racing	3	1992, 1996, 2000
Team Penske	3	2008, 2015, 2022
Holman-Moody	2	1965, 1967
Junior Johnson & Associates	2	1969, 1977
Melling Racing	2	1985, 1987
Roush Fenway Racing	2	2009, 2012
Bill Davis Racing	1	2002
Bud Moore Engineering	1	1978
DiGard Motorsports	1	1982
Earnhardt Ganassi Racing	1	2010
Front Row Motorsports	1	2021
Jim Stephens	1	1962
John Masoni	1	1960
JTG Daugherty Racing	1	2023
L. G. DeWitt	1	1975
Smokey Yunick	1	1961
Stavola Brothers Racing	1	1988
Stewart–Haas Racing	1	2017
Whitcomb Racing	1	1990
23XI Racing	1	2026

== By car make ==
Daytona 500 victories by car make
Make	Wins	Year(s)
Chevrolet	27	1960, 1975, 1977, 1984, 1986, 1989–1991, 1993–1995, 1997–1999, 2001, 2003–2007, 2010, 2013–2014, 2018, 2023–2025
Ford	17	1963, 1965, 1967, 1969, 1978, 1985, 1987, 1992, 1996, 2000, 2009, 2011–2012, 2015, 2017, 2021–2022
Dodge	4	1973–1974, 2002, 2008
Plymouth	4	1964, 1966, 1970–1971
Toyota	4	2016, 2019–2020, 2026
Buick	3	1981–1982, 1988
Mercury	3	1968, 1972, 1976
Oldsmobile	3	1959, 1979–1980
Pontiac	3	1961–1962, 1983

== Bibliography ==
- Tucker, Tom; Tiller, Tim (1994). Daytona: The Quest for Speed. Daytona Beach, Florida: The Daytona Beach News-Journal. ISBN 978-0-9640050-9-9 – via Internet Archive.
- Falk, Duane (2002). The Daytona 500: The Great American Race. New York City, United States: MetroBooks. ISBN 1-58663-169-1 – via Internet Archive.
- O'Malley, J. J. (2007). Daytona 500: 50 Years, The Great American Race, 2008. Lincolnwood, Illinois: Publications International. ISBN 978-1-4127-1570-6 – via Internet Archive.
