= 1960 Gwyn Staley 160 =

Auto race held at North Wilkesboro Speedway in 1960

Race details
- Race 7 of 44 in the 1960 NASCAR Grand National Series season
- North Wilkesboro Speedway
- Date: March 27, 1960
- Official name: Gwyn Staley 160
- Location: North Wilkesboro Speedway, North Wilkesboro, North Carolina
- Course: Permanent racing facility
- Course length: 1.005 km (0.625 miles)
- Distance: 160 laps, 100 mi (80 km)
- Weather: Mild with temperatures of 71.1 °F (21.7 °C); wind speeds of 10.1 miles per hour (16.3 km/h)
- Average speed: 66.437 miles per hour (106.920 km/h)
- Attendance: 9,200

Pole position
Driver	Junior Johnson	John Masoni

Most laps led
Driver	Junior Johnson	John Masoni
- Laps: 145

Winner
No. 42	Lee Petty	Petty Enterprises

Television in the United States
- Network: untelevised
- Announcers: none

The 1960 Gwyn Staley 160 was a NASCAR Grand National Series event that was held on March 27, 1960, at North Wilkesboro Speedway in North Wilkesboro, North Carolina.

Paul Lewis, who would eventually be known as the Gentleman Teacher, would make his NASCAR Cup Series debut in this event. Burrhead Nantz would retire from NASCAR Cup Series action after the end of this event.

== Background ==
Through the 1960s and 1970s the NASCAR Grand National Series began focusing on bigger, faster, and longer tracks. Like other short tracks in NASCAR at the time, crowd capacity and purses were small compared to the larger tracks. Over time, Enoch Staley and Jack Combs attempted to keep the facility modern and on pace with the growth of the sport. The West Grandstand was rebuilt with chair-type seats rather than the old bare concrete slabs. New larger restroom facilities were built, and the South Grandstand was expanded. A garage facility was also built within the track, which at the time was rare for short-track venues. But the main focus was on keeping ticket prices affordable. Food and beverage prices were kept low, and event parking and camping were always free. As long as profits covered maintenance costs, Staley was satisfied with the income of the track.

== Race report ==
Glen Wood, Junior Johnson and Lee Petty would dominate the entire 120-minute racing event where more than 9,000 people would see Rex White defeated by the elder Petty by less than a lap. Lee Petty would earn his incredible 49th career win, the most in NASCAR Cup Series history until his son Richard breaks the record.

There were 22 American-born drivers who qualified for this 160-lap extravaganza. Joe Lee Johnson was forced to become the last-place finisher due to troubles with his oil pressure. Even Junior Johnson's start in the pole position was barely enough to give him a "top five" finisher. Johnson's top speed of 83.86 miles per hour (134.96 km/h) during solo qualifying runs would allow him to stand up to Wood, Johnson, and both of the Petty family members while participating in this racing event. Lee Petty's son, Richard, would finish a lowly 18th after qualifying in an incredible fourth place due to his youth and general lack of experience behind the wheel. E.J. Trivette would be the lowest-finishing driver to actually finish the event; although he was more than 20 laps behind the lead lap cars by the time the race had ended.

Individual event winnings ranged from the winner's share of $900 ($9,566 when considering inflation) to the last-place finishers' share of $50 ($531 when considering inflation). The total prize purse for the 1960 running of the Gwyn Staley 160 was a then-incredible $3,985 ($42,356 when considering inflation).

Notable crew chiefs who actively participated in this race were Shep Langdon, Ray Fox, Bud Allman, and Louis Clements.

The transition to purpose-built racecars began in the early 1960s and occurred gradually over that decade. Changes made to the sport by the late 1960s brought an end to the "strictly stock" vehicles of the 1950s.

=== Qualifying ===
Grid	No.	Driver	Manufacturer	Owner
1	27	Junior Johnson	'59 Chevrolet	John Masoni
2	21	Glen Wood	'59 Ford	Wood Brothers
3	11	Ned Jarrett	'60 Ford	Ned Jarrett
4	43	Richard Petty	'59 Plymouth	Petty Enterprises
5	87	Buck Baker	'60 Chevrolet	Buck Baker
6	4	Rex White	'59 Chevrolet	Rex White
7	31	Joe Weatherly	'60 Ford	Holman-Moody
8	42	Lee Petty	'60 Plymouth	Petty Enterprises
9	94	Banjo Matthews	'60 Ford	Banjo Matthews
10	77	Joe Lee Johnson	'60 Ford	W.J. Ridgeway

=== Timeline ===
Section reference:

- Start of race: Glen Wood started the race in the pole position.
- Lap 2: Junior Johnson takes over the lead from Glen Wood.
- Lap 9: Joe Lee Johnson's oil pressure became faulty, causing him to become the last-place finisher.
- Lap 14: Neil Castles had a problem with his engine, forcing him out of the race.
- Lap 17: Burrhead Nantz' vehicle overheated, ending his day on the track.
- Lap 18: David Pearson had a terminal crash, causing him to withdraw from the event.
- Lap 125: Richard Petty had a problematic engine, forcing him to leave the race.
- Lap 127: Banjo Matthews had a terminal crash, forcing him to withdraw from the event.
- Lap 137: The rear end of Cotton Owens' vehicle fell off, ending his day on the track.
- Lap 144: Buck Baker had major engine issues, causing him to exit the race.
- Lap 147: Lee Petty takes over the lead from Junior Johnson.
- Finish: Lee Petty was officially declared the winner of the event.

== Finishing order ==
Section reference:

1. Lee Petty† (No. 42)
2. Rex White (No. 4)
3. Glen Wood† (No. 21)
4. Ned Jarrett (No. 11)
5. Junior Johnson (No. 27)
6. Doug Yates (No. 23)
7. Roy Tyner† (No. 78)
8. Jimmy Pardue† (No. 54)
9. Buddy Baker† (No. 1)
10. Joe Weatherly† (No. 31)
11. L.D. Austin (No. 74)
12. Paul Lewis (No. 42)
13. Bunkie Blackburn† (No. 64)
14. Buck Baker*† (No. 87)
15. E.J. Trivette (No. 35)
16. Cotton Owens*† (No. 50)
17. Banjo Matthews*† (No. 94)
18. Richard Petty* (No. 43)
19. David Pearson*† (No. 67)
20. Burrhead Nantz* (No. 51)
21. Neil Castles* (No. 80)
22. Joe Lee Johnson*† (No. 77)

* Driver failed to finish race
† Driver is known to be deceased

Preceded by 1960 untitled race at Southern States Fairgrounds	NASCAR Grand National Series Season; 1960	Succeeded by 1960 Copper Cup 100
