= Bubba Farr =

American racecar driver (1931–1985)

- Farr c. 1963
- Born: March 2, 1931; Augusta, Georgia, U.S.
- Died: May 2, 1985 (aged 54); Augusta

NASCAR Cup Series career
- 3 races run over 2 years
- Best finish: 121st (1963)
- First race: 1962 untitled race (Augusta Speedway)
- Last race: 1963 Daytona 500 (Daytona International Speedway)
| Wins | Top tens | Poles |
|---|---|---|
| 0 | 0 | 0 |

Marion P. Farr (2 March 1931 – 3 May 1985), known as Bubba or Bubber Farr, was an American stock car racing driver.

== Career ==
Farr had a career which lasted from 1953 until 1966, mostly in the NASCAR Sportsman Division.

Farr's two best achievements came at the Daytona International Speedway. In 1960, he won the Sportsman race supporting the Daytona 500, driving a Ford; the race was marked by a 37-car pile-up, which as at 2026 remains the biggest-ever in a NASCAR-sanctioned race. Farr won from 4th on the grid, duelling with the legendary Fireball Roberts (also in a Ford) for the lead for much of the distance, the issue being decided when Roberts' engine blew.

His other success came at the 1963 Daytona 500, his only appearance at the event, driving a Chevrolet for W. M. Harrison. Farr retired in the qualifying race, and had to take part in the 50-mile consolation heat to earn a place in the big race itself. Farr surprisingly won the race, beating Ralph Earnhardt, USAC Championship Car winner Len Sutton, and regular NASCAR Grand National winner Jim Paschal, helped by his Chevy being one fitted with a new "mystery motor" which had 427 cubic inches of capacity, rather than the 409 ci of the previous models. However his 500 was a disappointment as the new engine's unreliability raised its head again, and he retired after a mere 22 laps.

Farr only took part in one other NASCAR Grand National event - at his home circuit, Augusta Speedway, in September 1962, driving Lewis Osborne's Chevrolet, and being classified 16th and last after an early retirement.

== Personal life ==
Outside racing, Farr was a restaurant owner in Augusta, Georgia. Although the media tended to refer to him as Bubba Farr, he painted his nickname on his racecars as Bubber. In 1973, after his fishing boat broke down, he drifted off the American coast for 2 days before being rescued.

== External websites ==
- NASCAR statistics
- The 1960 Sportsman race at Daytona
