= Junior Johnson =

American racing driver (1931–2019)

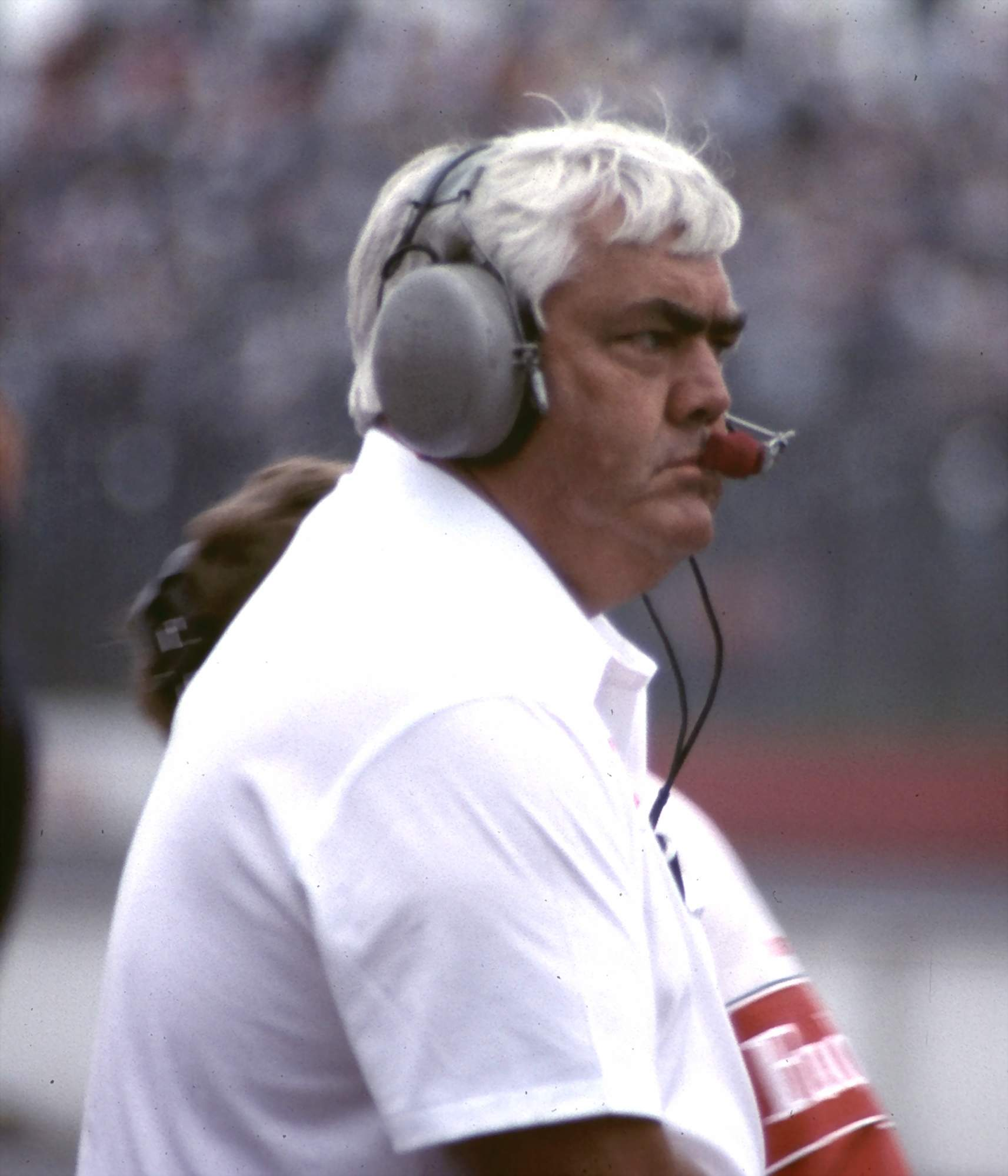
- Johnson in 1985
- Born: Robert Glenn Johnson Jr. June 28, 1931; Ronda, North Carolina, U.S.
- Died: December 20, 2019 (aged 88); Charlotte, North Carolina, U.S.
- Achievements: 1960 Daytona 500 winner 6× Winston Cup Series Owner's Champion with Cale Yarborough (1976, 1977, 1978) and Darrell Waltrip (1981, 1982, 1985)
- Awards: International Motorsports Hall of Fame (1990); Motorsports Hall of Fame of America (1991); Named one of NASCAR's 50 Greatest Drivers (1998); NASCAR Hall of Fame (2010 - Inaugural Class); Named one of NASCAR's 75 Greatest Drivers (2023)

NASCAR Cup Series career
- 313 races run over 14 years
- Best finish: 6th (1955, 1961)
- First race: 1950 Southern 500 (Darlington)
- Last race: 1966 American 500 (Rockingham)
- First win: 1955 Hickory Motor Speedway
- Last win: 1965 Wilkes 400 (North Wilkesboro)
Wins	Top tens	Poles
50	148	46

NASCAR Convertible Division career
- 2 races run over 1 year
- Best finish: 64th (1959)
- First race: 1959 Catawba 250 (Hickory)
- Last race: 1959 Old Dominion 500 (Martinsville)
Wins	Top tens	Poles
0	2	0

Robert Glenn Johnson Jr. (June 28, 1931 – December 20, 2019), better known as Junior Johnson, was an American professional stock car racing driver, engineer, and team owner as well as an entrepreneur. He won 50 NASCAR races in his career before retiring in 1966. In the 1970s and 1980s, he became a NASCAR racing team owner, winning the NASCAR championship with Cale Yarborough and Darrell Waltrip three times each; Johnson was the first owner to win multiple championships with multiple drivers. He is credited as the first to use the drafting technique in stock car racing. He was nicknamed "The Last American Hero," and his autobiography and movie The Last American Hero based on his upbringing is of the same name. In May 2007, Johnson teamed with Piedmont Distillers of Madison, North Carolina, to introduce the company's second moonshine product, called "Midnight Moon Moonshine", a nod to the days of his early youth in the 1940s when he made a living as a moonshiner/moon runner and bootlegger.

== Early life and race career ==
Johnson was born in Ronda, North Carolina, the fourth of seven children of Lora Belle (Money) and Robert Glenn Johnson, Sr. His family is of Ulster Scots descent, and settled in the foothills of North Carolina in the eighteenth century. The Johnson family was involved in the whiskey business before he was born. His maternal great-grandfather served as the second-highest-ranking Confederate general in North Carolina.

Johnson's father, a lifelong bootlegger, spent nearly 20 of his 63 years in prison, as their house was frequently raided by revenue agents. Junior was arrested and spent one year in prison in Ohio in 1956-57 for having an illegal still, although he was never caught in his many years of transporting bootleg liquor at high speed.

In 1955, Johnson began his career as a NASCAR driver. In his first full season, he won five races and finished sixth in the 1955 NASCAR Grand National points standings.

In 1958, Johnson won six races.

In 1959, Johnson won five more NASCAR Grand National races (including a win from the pole position at the 1959 Hickory 250); by this time he was regarded as one of the best short-track racers in the sport.

Johnson's first win at a "superspeedway" came at the Daytona 500 in 1960. Johnson and his crew chief, Ray Fox, were practicing for the race, trying to figure out how to increase their speed, which was 22 miles per hour (35 km/h) slower than that of the top cars in the race. During a test run, a faster car passed Johnson. He noticed that, when he moved behind that car, his own car's speed increased because of the faster car's slipstream. Johnson was then able to stay close behind the other car until the final lap of the test run, when he used the "slipstream" effect to slingshot past it. By using this technique, Johnson went on to win the 1960 Daytona 500, despite his car being slower than others on the field. Johnson's technique was quickly adopted by other drivers, and his practice of "drafting" has become a common tactic in NASCAR races.

In 1963, Johnson had a two-lap lead in the World 600 at Charlotte before a spectator threw a bottle onto the track and caused a crash; Johnson suffered only minor injuries. Johnson also tried but failed to qualify for the 1963 Indianapolis 500.

Johnson retired as a driver in 1966. In his career, Johnson claimed 50 victories, 11 at major speedway races. He retired as the winningest driver never to have a championship.

Johnson was a master of dirt track racing. "The two best drivers I've ever competed against on dirt are Junior Johnson and Dick Hutcherson," said two-time NASCAR champion Ned Jarrett.

== Career as a NASCAR owner ==
As a team owner, he worked with many NASCAR drivers, including Darel Dieringer, LeeRoy Yarbrough, Cale Yarborough, Bobby Allison, Darrell Waltrip, Neil Bonnett, Terry Labonte, Geoff Bodine, Sterling Marlin, Jimmy Spencer and Bill Elliott. In all, his drivers won 132 races, which is fifth to Petty Enterprises, Hendrick Motorsports, Joe Gibbs Racing and Roush Fenway Racing on the all-time list. His drivers won six Winston Cup Championships — three with Yarborough (1976–1978) and Waltrip (1981–82, 1985).

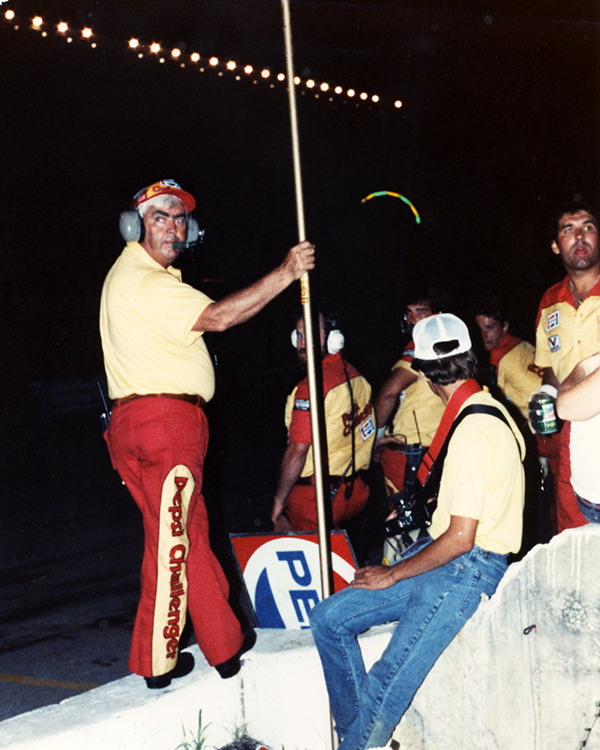
Junior Johnson, Darrell Waltrip, Car No. 11, Nashville 420, July 16, 1983

In 2011, Johnson announced that he would restart a race team with son Robert as the driver. Junior Johnson Racing will be located in Hamptonville, North Carolina. Robert, the 2010 UARA Rookie of the Year, planned to run a 28–30 race schedule in 2011, which included the entire K&N East Series schedule and some races in the UARA and Whelen All-American Series.

== Awards ==
- He was named one of NASCAR's 50 Greatest Drivers in 1998.
- He was inducted in the Motorsports Hall of Fame of America in 1991.
- Johnson joined Michael Jordan, Dale Earnhardt Jr. and Richard Petty by having a stretch of highway named in his honor in 2004. His daughter Meredith sang the national anthem at the dedication of the highway. An 8.5-mile (13.7 km) stretch of U.S. Highway 421 from the Yadkin and Wilkes county line to the Windy Gap exit is named Junior Johnson Highway.
- He was inducted into the NASCAR Hall of Fame on May 23, 2010.
- He was named one of NASCAR's 75 Greatest Drivers (2023)

== Family ==
Johnson was briefly married in 1949 to Mary Gray. His marriage to childhood sweetheart Flossie Clark (1929–2020) ended in divorce in 1992; they were legally married in 1975, although they had been together since the early 1950s. (Racing Legends have them as married in 1958). His marriage to Lisa Day (b.1965) in 1992 resulted in two children: daughter Meredith Suzanne (b.1995) and son Robert Glenn Johnson III (b.1993), both of whom attended Duke University. Johnson built a new home for his family in 1997, ultimately selling in 2012 because of poor health. He resided in Charlotte, North Carolina, at the time of his death in 2019. Until Flossie's death on April 9, 2020, she still resided in the family home, built by Junior in 1964 (next to Johnson's old Ingle Hollow race shop), which she kept as part of the divorce settlement.

== Presidential pardon ==
On December 26, 1986, President Ronald Reagan granted Johnson a presidential pardon for his 1956 moonshining conviction. In response to the pardon, which restored his right to vote, Johnson said, "I could not have imagined anything better."

== Film ==
In the mid-1960s, writer Tom Wolfe researched and wrote an article about Johnson, published in March 1965 in Esquire, and reprinted in Wolfe's The Kandy-Kolored Tangerine Flake Streamline Baby. This was eventually reprinted in The Best American Sports Writing of the Century, ed. David Halberstam (1999). The article, originally entitled "Great Balls of Fire", turned Johnson into a national celebrity and led to fame beyond the circle of NASCAR fans. In turn, the article was made into a 1973 movie based on Johnson's career as a driver and moonshiner, The Last American Hero (a.k.a. Hard Driver). Jeff Bridges starred as a fictionalized Johnson, and Johnson himself served as technical advisor for the film. The movie was critically acclaimed and featured the Jim Croce hit song "I Got A Name".

Follow Your Dreams Productions' President and CEO, Fred Griffith, has signed a rights deal for a true-life story movie about Junior Johnson (Sports Illustrated Vault, 2006). Griffith, an American actor and producer from South Carolina, is currently adapting a screenplay based largely on the book, Junior Johnson, Brave In Life, written by Tom Higgins and Steve Waid (Big West Racing, 2006). Veteran actor and producer Chris Mulkey is a writing producer for the film. According to Griffith, this film—unlike The Last American Hero, which was about a fictionalized version of Johnson named Junior "Jackson"—will remain true to the real life of Junior Johnson.(Morris 2006, p. C-1) Johnson had a voice role in the animated film Cars 3, as Junior "Midnight" Moon, a reference to his Moonshine Company.

Outside of film, Bruce Springsteen mentioned Junior Johnson in his song, "Cadillac Ranch," from the River album in 1980: "James Dean in that Mercury '49, Junior Johnson runnin' through the woods of Caroline, even Burt Reynolds in that black Trans-Am, all gonna meet down at the Cadillac Ranch."

== Midnight Moon ==
In May 2007, Johnson teamed with Piedmont Distillers to introduce the company's second moonshine product, called Midnight Moon. Johnson became part-owner of Piedmont Distillers, the only legal distiller in North Carolina at the time. Piedmont Distillers is located in Madison, N.C., in the town's former train station built in 1915. The moonshine is made in small batches in a copper still, authentic to the Johnson family tradition of making moonshine.

== Death ==
Johnson died at a hospice care facility in Charlotte on December 20, 2019, at age 88. He had Alzheimer's disease at the time.

== Motorsports career results ==
=== NASCAR ===
(key) (Bold – Pole position awarded by qualifying time. Italics – Pole position earned by points standings or practice time. * – Most laps led.)

==== Grand National Series ====
NASCAR Grand National Series results
Year	Team	No.	Make	1	2	3	4	5	6	7	8	9	10	11	12	13	14	15	16	17	18	19	20	21	22	23	24	25	26	27	28	29	30	31	32	33	34	35	36	37	38	39	40	41	42	43	44	45	46	47	48	49	50	51	52	53	54	55	56	57	58	59	60	61	62	NGNC	Pts
1953	Junior Johnson & Associates	75	Olds	PBS	DAB	HAR	NWS	CLT	RCH	CCS	LAN	CLB	HCY	MAR	PMS	RSP	LOU	FFS	LAN	TCS	WIL	MCF	PIF	MOR	ATL	RVS	LCF	DAV	HBO	AWS	PAS	HCY	DAR; 38	CCS	LAN	BLF	WIL	NWS	MAR	ATL																										NA	-
1954	George Miller	23	Hudson	PBS	DAB	JSP	ATL	OSP	OAK	NWS	HBO	CCS	LAN	WIL	MAR	SHA	RSP	CLT	GAR	CLB	LND	HCY; 5	MCF	WGS	PIF	AWS	SFS	GRS	MOR	OAK	CLT	SAN	COR	DAR	CCS	CLT																														55th	465
1954	Paul Whiteman	7	Cadillac																																		LAN; 15																													55th	465
1954	Paul Whiteman	17	Cadillac																																			**MAS**; 51	MAR; 33	NWS																										55th	465
1955	Paul Whiteman	7	Cadillac	TCS; 17																																																														6th	4810
1955	B & L Motors	55	Olds		PBS; 14	JSP; 5	DAB; 35	OSP; 14	CLB; 7	HBO; 12	NWS; 18	MGY	LAN; 3	CLT; 20	HCY; 1*	ASF	TUS	MAR; 3*	RCH; 5	NCF; 1*	FOR; 22	**LIN**; 1*	MCF; 12	FON; 1*	AIR	CLT; 5	PIF; 19	CLB; 14	AWS; 15	MOR; 4	ALS; 1*			CLT; 8	FOR; 19	MAS; 7	RSP; 7	DAR; 36	MGY; 10	LAN; 26	RSP; 25			**CLB**; 7	MAR	LVP	NWS; 26	HBO																		6th	4810
1955	Henry Ford	303	Chrysler																													NYF; 18	SAN																																	6th	4810
1955	Petty Enterprises	44	Chevy																																							GPS; 2	MAS																							6th	4810
1956	A. L. Bumgarner	55	Pontiac	HCY	CLT	WSS	PBS	ASF	DAB; 40	PBS	WIL; 24		**NWS**; 28	LAN; 24	RCH	CLB; 25	CON	GPS	HCY; 24	HBO	MAR	LIN							CLT; 14	MCF	POR	AWS; 20	RSP	PIF	CSF	CHI	CCF	MGY	OKL																											37th	1372
1956	Jim Stephens	286	Pontiac									ATL; 17																																																						37th	1372
1956	Carl Kiekhaefer	502	Dodge																				CLT; 2	POR	EUR	NYF	MER	MAS																																						37th	1372
1956	DePaolo Engineering	296	Ford																																					ROA; 26	OBS	SAN	NOR	PIF	MYB	POR																				37th	1372
1956	Smokey Yunick	32	Chevy																																												DAR; 15	CSH	CLT	LAN	POR	CLB	HBO	NWP	CLT	CCF	MAR									37th	1372
1956	DePaolo Engineering	2	Ford																																																							HCY; 15	WIL							37th	1372
1957	A. L. Bumgarner	55	Pontiac	WSS	CON	TIC	DAB	CON	WIL	HBO	AWS	NWS	LAN	CLT	PIF	GBF	POR	CCF	RCH	MAR	POR	EUR	LIN	LCS	ASP	NWP	CLB	CPS	PIF	JAC	RSP	CLT	MAS	POR	HCY	NOR	LCS	GLN	KPC	LIN	OBS	MYB	DAR	NYF	AWS	CSF	SCF	LAN	CLB	CCF	CLT	MAR	NBR	CON	NWS; 20	GBF										154th	-
1958	Paul Spaulding	11	Ford	FAY	DAB	CON	FAY	WIL	HBO	FAY	CLB; 30	PIF; 3	ATL; 20	CLT	MAR; 30	ODS; 8	OBS; 7	GPS; 3	GBF; 3	STR	NWS; 1*	BGS	TRN; 2	RSD	CLB; 1	NBS; 1	REF; 1*	LIN; 31	HCY; 2	AWS; 12	RSP; 54							BRR; 4	CLB	NSV	AWS	BGS	MBS; 7	DAR; 11	CLT; 19	BIR	CSF	GAF	RCH; 14	HBO; 15*	SAS	MAR; 36	NWS; 1	ATL; 1												8th	6380
1958	Dick Beaty	34	Ford																													MCC; 6	SLS	TOR	BUF	MCF	BEL																													8th	6380
1959	Paul Spaulding	11	Ford	FAY; 5	DAY; 17	DAY; 14	HBO; 19	CON; 4	ATL	WIL; 1	BGS	CLB	NWS; 22	**REF**; 1	**HCY**; 1	MAR; 3	TRN; 11	CLT; 18	NSV; 2	ASP	PIF; 3	GPS; 1	ATL; 21	CLB; 16	WIL; 1	RCH; 20	BGS; 4	AWS; 3	DAY	HEI	CLT; 35	MBS											HBO; 22	MAR	AWS; 9	NWS; 5	CON; 17																			11th	4864
1959	Wood Brothers Racing	21	Ford																														CLT; 25	NSV	AWS	BGS	GPS	CLB	DAR	HCY; 4	RCH	CSF																								11th	4864
1960	Paul Spaulding	11	Dodge	CLT; 28	CLB; 19																																																													7th	9932
1960	John Masoni	27	Chevy			DAY; 5	DAY	DAY; 1*		NWS; 5*	PHO	CLB; 8	MAR; 8	HCY; 23	WIL; 10				DAR; 24	PIF	HBO; 9	RCH; 14	HMS	CLT; 59	BGS	DAY; 15	HEI	MAB	MBS; 4	ATL; 43	BIR	NSV	AWS; 30	PIF; 3	CLB; 24	SBO; 1*	BGS; 3	DAR; 47	HCY; 1	CSF	GSP; 3	HBO; 13	MAR; 3	NWS; 2		RCH; 2																				7th	9932
1960	Wood Brothers Racing	21	Ford						CLT; 4									**AWS**; 15																																																7th	9932
1960	Bob Welborn	14	Chevy													BGS; 15																																																		7th	9932
1960	W. T. Coppedge	50	Chevy														GPS; 12																																																	7th	9932
1960	John Masoni	27	Pontiac																																										CLT; 5		ATL; 24																			7th	9932
1961	Rex Lovette	27	Pontiac	CLT; 18	**JSP**; 22	DAY; 10	DAY	DAY; 47	PIF; 10*	AWS; 11	HMS	ATL; 27	**GPS**; 16	HBO; 4*	BGS; 8	MAR; 6	**NWS**; 22	CLB	**HCY**; 1*	RCH	MAR; 1*	DAR	CLT				CLT; 9	PIF; 19	BIR	GPS; 25	**BGS**; 3	NOR	HAS; 5	STR; 1	DAY; 17	ATL; 31	CLB; 4	MBS; 22	BRI; 22*	NSV; 19	**BGS**; 19	AWS; 1*	**RCH**; 1*	SBO; 1*	DAR; 14	HCY; 20	**RCH**; 2	CSF	ATL; 2	MAR; 3*	**NWS**; 4*	CLT; 9	BRI; 24*	GPS; 1	HBO; 12											6th	17178
1961	John Masoni	3	Pontiac																					CLT; 2	RSD	ASP																																								6th	17178
1962	Rex Lovette	27	Pontiac	CON; 24	AWS; 26	DAY; 5	DAY	DAY; 34	CON				RCH; 3	CLB	**NWS**; 3	GPS	MBS	MAR; 22	BGS; 15	BRI; 30	RCH	HCY; 14	CON																															NWS; 4												20th	11140
1962	Buck Baker Racing	86	Chrysler							AWS; 21	SVH	HBO																																																						20th	11140
1962	Nichels Engineering	39	Pontiac																					DAR; 31	PIF																																									20th	11140
1962	Owens Racing	6	Pontiac																							CLT; 38	ATL; 9	BGS	AUG	RCH	SBO	DAY; 2	CLB	ASH	GPS	AUG	SVH	MBS	BRI; 29*																											20th	11140
1962	Fox Racing	3	Pontiac																																					CHT; 17	NSV	HUN	AWS	STR	BGS	PIF	VAL	DAR; 2	HCY; 21	RCH	DTS	AUG	MAR; 17		CLT; 1*	ATL; 36										20th	11140
1963	Fox Racing	3	Chevy	BIR	GGS	THS	RSD	DAY; 1	DAY	DAY; 42	**PIF**; 17	**AWS**; 3	HBO; 1*	**ATL**; 42	**HCY**; 1*	BRI; 3	AUG	RCH; 5*	GPS	SBO	BGS	MAR; 33	NWS; 27	CLB	THS	DAR; 25	ODS	RCH	**CLT**; 2*	BIR; 2	ATL; 1*	**DAY**; 17*	MBS	SVH	DTS; 10	**BGS**; 17*	ASH; 15	OBS	BRR	BRI; 22	GPS	NSV	CLB; 17	AWS; 15	PIF	**BGS**; 1*	ONA; 20	DAR; 20	HCY; 1*	RCH; 25	MAR; 21	DTS	NWS; 28	THS	CLT; 1*	SBO; 15*	HBO; 13									12th	17720
1963	Bill Stroppe	26	Mercury																																																							RSD; 5								12th	17720
1964	Fox Racing	3	Chevy	CON; 19	AUG; 21	JSP	SVH	RSD																																																										14th	17066
1964	Fox Racing	3	Dodge						DAY; 1	DAY	DAY; 9	RCH; 4	BRI; 15	GPS	BGS; 13	ATL; 4	AWS; 2	HBO; 9	PIF	CLB	NWS; 4																																													14th	17066
1964	Matthews Racing	00	Ford																			MAR; 3	SVH																																											14th	17066
1964	Matthews Racing	27	Ford																					DAR; 3	LGY			CLT; 34	GPS	ASH	**ATL**; 27	CON	NSV	CHT	BIR	VAL	PIF	DAY; 24	ODS	OBS	BRR	ISP	GLN	LIN	BRI; 18	NSV	MBS	**AWS**; 3*	DTS	ONA; 2	CLB; 14*	**BGS**; 1*	STR; 1*	DAR; 23	HCY; 22	RCH; 8*	ODS	HBO	MAR; 3	SVH	NWS; 13*	CLT; 34	HAR	AUG	JAC	14th	17066
1964	Holman-Moody	28	Ford																							HCY; 17	SBO																																							14th	17066
1965	Junior Johnson & Associates	27	Ford	**RSD**; 2	DAY	**DAY**; 1*																																																												12th	18486
1965	Junior Johnson & Associates	26	Ford				DAY; 28	PIF; 11	ASW; 12	**RCH**; 1*	**HBO**; 2*	ATL; 27	GPS	**NWS**; 1	**MAR**; 22	CLB	BRI; 1*	DAR; 1*	LGY; 16	**BGS**; 1*	HCY; 1	CLT; 24	CCF	**ASH**; 1*	HAR	NSV	BIR	ATL; 4*	GPS	MBS	VAL	DAY; 26	ODS; 1*	OBS; 1	ISP; 14	GLN; 15	BRI; 23	NSV; 8	CCF	AWS; 18	SMR	PIF	AUG	CLB; 17	DTS	BLV	BGS; 1*	**DAR**; 44	**HCY**; 4*	LIN	ODS	RCH; 3	MAR; 1*	NWS; 1*	CLT; 32	HBO; 15	CAR; 32	DTS								12th	18486
1966	Junior Johnson & Associates	26	Ford	AUG	RSD	DAY	DAY	DAY	CAR	BRI	ATL	HCY	CLB	GPS	BGS	NWS	MAR	DAR	LGY	MGR	MON	RCH	CLT	DTS	ASH	PIF	SMR	AWS	BLV	GPS	DAY	ODS	BRR	OXF	FON	ISP	BRI	SMR	NSV	ATL	CLB	**AWS**; 19*	BLV	BGS	DAR	HCY; 11	RCH; 15	HBO; 20	**MAR**; 14	**NWS**; 28	CLT															49th	3750
1966	Junior Johnson & Associates	47	Ford																																																	CAR; 5														49th	3750

===== Daytona 500 =====
Year	Team	Manufacturer	Start	Finish
1959	Paul Spaulding	Ford	33	14
1960	John Masoni	Chevrolet	9	**1**
1961	Rex Lovette	Pontiac	43	47
1962	Rex Lovette	Pontiac	9	34
1963	Fox Racing	Chevrolet	3	42
1964	Fox Racing	Dodge	3	9
1965	Junior Johnson & Associates	Ford	2	28

== See also ==
- List of people pardoned or granted clemency by the president of the United States

Achievements
Preceded by Lee Petty	Daytona 500 Winner; 1960	Succeeded by Marvin Panch
