= 1959 Western North Carolina 500 =

Auto race held at Asheville-Weaverville Speedway in 1959

Race details
- Race 32 of 44 in the 1959 NASCAR Grand National Series season
- Date: August 16, 1959; 66 years ago
- Official name: Western North Carolina 500
- Location: Asheville-Weaverville Speedway, Weaverville, North Carolina
- Course: Permanent racing facility
- Course length: 0.500 miles (0.804 km)
- Distance: 500 laps, 250 mi (310 km)
- Weather: Very hot with temperatures of 87.1 °F (30.6 °C); wind speeds of 12 miles per hour (19 km/h)
- Average speed: 71.633 miles per hour (115.282 km/h)

Pole position
Driver	Rex White	Rex White

Most laps led
Driver	Bob Welborn	Bob Welborn
- Laps: 1

Winner
No. 49	Bob Welborn	Bob Welborn

Television in the United States
- Network: untelevised
- Announcers: none

The 1959 Western North Carolina 500 was a NASCAR Grand National Series event that was held on August 16, 1959, at Asheville-Weaverville Speedway in Weaverville, North Carolina. This event took place after the 1959 Nashville 300; which was set at Nashville Speedway (now Fairgrounds Speedway) in Nashville, Tennessee.

From 1949 to 1972, Richard and Lee Petty were the most dominant drivers on any circuit in NASCAR. David Pearson was easily the third most dominant NASCAR driver. Buck Baker and Rex White were considered to be the middle-of-the road competitors in NASCAR from 1949 to 1972. Fonty and Tim Flock along with Herb Thomas, Joe Weatherly, Ned Jarrett, and Bobby Isaac were considered to be below-average performers during the early years of NASCAR.

The race car drivers still had to commute to the races using the same stock cars that competed in a typical weekend's race through a policy of homologation (and under their own power). This policy was in effect until roughly 1975. By 1980, NASCAR had completely stopped tracking the year model of all the vehicles and most teams did not take stock cars to the track under their own power any more.

== Race report ==
There were 42 American-born drivers who competed at this event; all of them were Caucasian males since Wendell Scott didn't make his introduction into NASCAR until the next decade. There were 500 laps on this race that took almost three and a half hours to resolve. Brownie King was the last-place finisher in this race due to trouble with his fan belt on lap 44.

A lot of engine problems emerged within the first 100 laps in addition to faulty spindles, decaying axles, and one crash involving Richard Petty on the 281st lap. While Rex White would zoom into the pole position driving at speeds up to 77.687 miles per hour (125.025 km/h) during solo qualifying runs, Bob Welborn in a 1959 Chevrolet convertible would defeat Lee Petty in a 1959 Plymouth hardtop vehicle by three laps averaging speeds up to 71.633 miles per hour (115.282 km/h). Welborn would go winless after this race until he retired after the running of the 1964 Pennsylvania 200 in New Oxford, Pennsylvania.

A lot of Chevrolets, Thunderbirds, and Ford vehicles participated in this race. These vehicles were considered to be the quintessential vehicles own during the late 1950s and early 1960s. The only problems with fuel occurred when G.C. Spencer ran out of gas on lap 463. Bill Scott and Dominic Persicketti were the typical example of maverick stock car drivers who drove during the days when it was affordable for the daring to go without a sponsor. All the inside starters were hardtops while all the outside starters were convertibles.

Benny Rakestraw would make his grand exit from top-level NASCAR racing after this event while Chuck Tombs and Layman Utsman would make their introductions here.

Notable crew chiefs for this race were Shorty Johns, Mario Rossi and Jess Potter. Potter was also the owner of Brownie King's vehicle while Rossi took care of Tom Pistone's vehicle while in the pits. Shorty Johns was also listed as the owner of Bobby Johns' vehicle.

=== Qualifying ===
Grid	No.	Driver	Manufacturer
1	4	Rex White	'59 Chevrolet
2	21	Glen Wood	'58 Ford
3	72	Bobby Johns	'57 Chevrolet
4	49	Bob Welborn	'59 Chevrolet
5	47	Jack Smith	'59 Chevrolet
6	77	Joe Lee Johnson	'57 Chevrolet
7	36	Tommy Irwin	'59 Ford Thunderbird
8	10	Elmo Langley	'59 Buick
9	42	Lee Petty	'59 Plymouth
10	93	Banjo Matthews	'59 Ford Thunderbird
11	88	Buck Baker	'59 Chevrolet
12	76	Larry Frank	'57 Chevrolet
13	5	Tiny Lund	'57 Chevrolet
14	41	Joe Weatherly	'59 Ford Thunderbird
15	92	Speedy Thompson	'59 Ford Thunderbird
16	17	Fred Harb	'57 Ford Thunderbird
17	40	Dave White	'58 Chevrolet
18	9	Roy Tyner	'57 Chevrolet
19	6	Cotton Owens	'59 Ford Thunderbird
20	25	Gene White	'57 Chevrolet

== Finishing order ==
Section reference:

1. Bob Welborn
2. Lee Petty
3. Jack Smith
4. Joe Lee Johnson
5. Rex White
6. Larry Frank
7. Cotton Owens
8. Buck Baker
9. Marvin Porter
10. Bobby Johns
11. Bob Duell
12. G.C. Spencer
13. Shep Langdon
14. Tiny Lund
15. L.D. Austin
16. George Green
17. Ned Jarrett
18. Dominic Persicketti
19. George Alsobrook
20. Benny Rakestraw
21. Herman Berman
22. Roy Tyner
23. Elmo Langley
24. Harlan Richardson
25. Whitey Norman
26. Richard Petty
27. Bud Crothers
28. Glen Wood
29. Dave White
30. Earl Balmer
31. Tommy Irwin
32. Gene White
33. Neil Castles
34. Tom Pistone
35. Banjo Matthews
36. Fred Harb
37. Speedy Thompson
38. Bill Scott
39. Freddy Fryar
40. Joe Weatherly
41. Brownie King

Preceded by 1958	Western North Carolina 500 races 1959	Succeeded by 1960
