= 1963 Daytona 500 =

Auto race held at Daytona International Speedway in 1963

Race details
- Race 7 of 55 in the 1963 NASCAR Grand National Series season
- 1963 Daytona 500 program cover
- Date: February 24, 1963
- Location: Daytona International Speedway; Daytona Beach, Florida, U.S.
- Course: Permanent racing facility 2.5 mi (4.023 km)
- Distance: 200 laps, 500 mi (800 km)
- Average speed: 151.556 mph (243.906 km/h)

Pole position
Driver	Fireball Roberts	Banjo Matthews

Qualifying race winners
Duel 1 Winner	Junior Johnson	Ray Fox
Duel 2 Winner	Johnny Rutherford	Smokey Yunick

Most laps led
Driver	Fred Lorenzen	Holman-Moody
- Laps: 77

Winner
No. 21 Ford	Tiny Lund	Wood Brothers Racing

Television in the United States
- Network: ABC's WWOS
- Announcers: Bill Flemming and Chris Economaki

The 1963 Daytona 500, the 5th running of the event held on February 24, 1963, was won by Tiny Lund driving a 1963 Ford. Lund drove his number 21 to victory in three hours and 17 minutes. There were 2 cautions flags which slowed the race for 10 laps.

Weather played a critical role in Tiny Lund winning this race; with temperatures reaching up to 75 °F (24 °C) and wind speeds up to 20 miles per hour (32 km/h). Lund won by making only four pit stops, but he would not have been able to make the distance on four pit stops had the first ten laps not been run under caution to dry the track from earlier rains. Had the race not started under caution, Lund would have had to make five pit stops, just as Fred Lorenzen and Ned Jarrett did. He was able to win on four pit stops alone because of the slow start time.

== Race report ==
Lund filled in for an injured Marvin Panch, who suffered injuries after a testing crash in a Maserati. Panch was to drive a Wood Brothers car in the 500. The win was Lund's first victory of the season.

Jim Cushman, Bubba Farr, Dick Good, Ted Hairfield, and John Rogers retired from professional stock car racing after this event. Drivers who failed to qualify for the race were: Bobby Isaac (#99), Buck Baker (#87), Pete Stewart (#57), Cale Yarborough (#52), Larry Thomas (#36), Roy Mayne (#33), Chuck Daigh (#25), Rodger Ward (#16), Al Terrell (#9) and Bill Foster (#2).

It was the first Daytona 500 start for LeeRoy Yarbrough, H. B. Bailey, Stick Elliott, Wendell Scott, A. J. Foyt, Jim Hurtubise, and Bob Cooper. Only Daytona 500 starts for Troy Ruttman, Bob James, Red Foote, Len Sutton, Floyd Powell, Frank Graham, John Rogers, Dick Good, Bubba Farr, and Ted Hairfield. Last Daytona 500 starts for Nelson Stacy, Joe Weatherly, Tommy Irwin, Rex White, Ed Livingston, Jim Cushman, Herman Beam, Jim McGuirk, and Jack Smith.

Parnelli Jones, at the wheel of Bill Stroppe's factory-backed Mercury, comes home 15th in the second of his three Daytona 500 appearances. While a great finish wasn't in the cards here about three months later Jones would go on to win the Indianapolis 500.

The transition to purpose-built racecars began in the early 1960s and occurred gradually over that decade. Changes made to the sport by the late 1960s brought an end to the "strictly stock" vehicles of the 1950s.

This race marked the first time that ABC's Wide World of Sports covered the race. It also helped to dispel the long-standing stereotypes of the Southern United States after the rest of the United States witnessed an emotional inspiring win.

== Race results ==
Pos	Grid	No.	Driver	Entrant	Manufacturer	Laps	Winnings	Laps led	Time/Status
1	12	21	Tiny Lund	Wood Brothers Racing	1963 Ford	200	$24,550	17	3:17:56
2	2	28	Fred Lorenzen	Holman-Moody	1963 Ford	200	$15,540	77	+24 seconds
3	8	11	Ned Jarrett	Charles Robinson	1963 Ford	200	$8,700	26	Lead lap under green flag
4	10	29	Nelson Stacy	Holman-Moody	1963 Ford	199	$8,275	0	+1 Lap
5	11	0	Dan Gurney	Holman-Moody	1963 Ford	199	$3,550	0	+1 Lap
6	23	43	Richard Petty	Petty Enterprises	1963 Plymouth	198	$2,500	0	+2 Laps
7	14	7A	Bobby Johns	Shorty Johns	1963 Pontiac	198	$2,600	10	+2 Laps
8	26	8	Joe Weatherly	Bud Moore Engineering	1963 Pontiac	197	$1,500	0	+3 Laps
9	4	13	Johnny Rutherford	Smokey Yunick	1963 Chevrolet	196	$1,250	0	+4 Laps
10	13	44	Tommy Irwin	Stewart McKinney	1963 Ford	195	$1,000	0	+5 Laps
11	9	06	Larry Frank	Holman-Moody	1963 Ford	195	$1,500	5	+5 Laps
12	15	14	Troy Ruttman	Bill Stroppe	1963 Mercury	195	$1,000	0	+5 Laps
13	22	39	LeeRoy Yarbrough	E. A. McQuagg	1962 Pontiac	194	$1,000	0	+6 Laps
14	6	4	Rex White	Rex White	1963 Chevrolet	194	$1,100	4	+6 Laps
15	16	15	Parnelli Jones	Bill Stroppe	1963 Mercury	194	$1,000	0	+6 Laps
16	18	26	Darel Dieringer	Bill Stroppe	1963 Mercury	192	$675	0	+8 Laps
17	25	80	Sal Tovella	Tom Hawkins	1963 Ford	192	$675	0	+8 Laps
18	27	32	Bob James	Roscoe Sanders	1963 Plymouth	191	$675	0	+9 Laps
19	49	04	H. B. Bailey	H. B. Bailey	1961 Pontiac	188	$675	0	+12 Laps
20	30	18	Stick Elliott	Toy Bolton	1962 Pontiac	188	$675	0	+12 Laps
21	1	22	Fireball Roberts	Banjo Matthews	1963 Pontiac	182	$650	11	Engine
22	42	56	Ed Livingston	Mamie Reynolds	1962 Ford	180	$550	0	+20 Laps
23	47	95	Jim Cushman	Jack Russell	1963 Plymouth	176	$550	0	+24 Laps
24	45	19	Herman Beam	Herman Beam	1963 Ford	175	$550	0	+25 Laps
25	39	54	Jimmy Pardue	Pete Stewart	1962 Pontiac	169	$550	0	Transmission
26	41	34	Wendell Scott	Wendell Scott	1962 Chevrolet	168	$550	0	Engine
27	7	02	A. J. Foyt	Ray Nichels	1963 Pontiac	143	$550	6	Spin out
28	37	41	Jim Hurtubise	Petty Enterprises	1963 Plymouth	113	$550	0	Engine
29	35	84	Red Foote	Rocky Hinton	1963 Ford	113	$550	0	Con rod
30	17	69	Johnny Allen	Lou Sidoit	1963 Mercury	111	$550	0	Engine
31	33	07	Len Sutton	Ray Nichels	1963 Pontiac	97	$550	0	Engine
32	21	03	G. C. Spencer	Ray Fox	1963 Chevrolet	95	$1,550	21	Engine
33	29	70	Floyd Powell	Paul Clayton	1962 Pontiac	94	$550	0	Wheel studs
34	44	68	Frank Graham	Ed Livingston	1961 Ford	93	$550	0	Engine
35	36	58	John Rogers	John Rogers	1961 Pontiac	72	$550	0	Handling
36	34	42	Jim Paschal	Petty Enterprises	1963 Plymouth	72	$550	0	Ignition
37	19	81	Dick Good	Romy Hammes	1963 Ford	68	$550	0	Spin out
38	43	05	Jim McGuirk	Ray Nichels	1962 Pontiac	67	$550	0	Fumes
39	28	51	Bob Cooper	Bob Cooper	1962 Pontiac	53	$550	0	Engine
40	5	01	Paul Goldsmith	Ray Nichels	1963 Pontiac	39	$1,250	11	Piston
41	46	5	Billy Wade	Cotton Owens	1963 Dodge	32	$550	0	Valves
42	3	3	Junior Johnson	Ray Fox	1963 Chevrolet	26	$1,750	12	Distributor
43	31	71	Bubba Farr	W. M. Harrison	1963 Chevrolet	22	$550	0	Fuel pump
44	38	47	Jack Smith	Jack Smith	1963 Chrysler	19	$550	0	Flywheel
45	20	10	Bunkie Blackburn	Jim Stephens	1962 Pontiac	18	$550	0	Water pump
46	40	67	Reb Wickersham	Reb Wickersham	1962 Pontiac	18	$550	0	Engine
47	32	73	Ralph Earnhardt	Acey Taylor	1962 Pontiac	15	$550	0	Fuel pump
48	50	6	David Pearson	Cotton Owens	1963 Dodge	12	$550	0	Handling
49	24	72	Ted Hairfield	Parker Snead	1963 Ford	11	$550	0	Clutch
50	48	62	Curtis Crider	Curtis Crider	1962 Mercury	4	$550	0	Handling
