= Fritz Wilson =

American racing driver (1928–2007)

Fred C. Wilson
- Born: August 2, 1928
- Awards: Colorado Motorsports Hall of Fame Inductee

NASCAR Cup Series career
- 12 races run over 3 years
- Best finish: 63
- First race: 1959 Daytona 500 Qualifier
- Last race: 1965 Motortrend 500 (Riverside)
Wins	Top tens	Poles
0	4	0

Fred C. Wilson (August 2, 1928 – May 1, 2007) was an American racecar driver from Denver, Colorado.

== Trivia ==
Wilson won a race on three wheels, only to be disqualified. He led the first laps of the 1st Daytona 500, only to have engine failure in the beginning of the race. This rendered him the nickname "Fritz-fritzy", applying the common phrase "on the fritz" to his name, in reference to his vehicle malfunction.
