= 1957 Virginia 500 =

Auto race held at Martinsville Speedway in 1957

Race details
- Race 17 of 53 in the 1957 NASCAR Grand National Series season
- 1957 Virginia 500 program cover
- Date: May 19, 1957
- Official name: Virginia 500
- Location: Martinsville Speedway, Martinsville, Virginia
- Course: Permanent racing facility
- Course length: 0.500 miles (0.805 km)
- Distance: 441 laps, 220.500 mi (354.860 km)
- Scheduled distance: 500 laps, 250.000 mi (402.336 km)
- Weather: Temperatures of 81 °F (27 °C); wind speeds of 11.1 miles per hour (17.9 km/h)
- Average speed: 57.318 miles per hour (92.244 km/h)

Pole position
Driver	Paul Goldsmith	Smokey Yunick Racing

Most laps led
Driver	Billy Myers	Bill Strope
- Laps: 201

Winner
No. 87	Buck Baker	Hugh Babb

The 1957 Virginia 500 was a NASCAR Grand National Series event that was held on May 19, 1957, at Martinsville Speedway in Martinsville, Virginia.

Barney Oldfield made his only NASCAR Cup Series appearance at this event. Months after this race, the Automobile Manufacturers Association decided to legally separate themselves from all forms of automobile racing that was being held in the United States; donating millions of dollars in machinery directly to the drivers.

== Background ==
A map showing the layout of Martinsville Speedway, the venue where the race was held.

Martinsville Speedway is one of five short tracks to hold NASCAR races. The standard track at Martinsville Speedway is a four-turn short track oval that is 0.526 miles (0.847 km) long. The track's turns are banked at eleven degrees, while the front stretch, the location of the finish line, is banked at zero degrees. The back stretch also has a zero degree banking.

== Race report ==
It took nearly four hours to race 441 laps worth of stock car automobile racing. While originally scheduled for 500 laps, it was stopped prematurely due to a bad in-race crash. Tom Pistone and Billy Myers would end up getting involved in the collision on lap 441; making Buck Baker the automatic winner. Just before the accident took form, Pistone straightened his car and continued. Myers headed for the wall and then jumped it near where a crowd of folks was standing. The 24-driver starting lineup was made up of drivers who were all born in the United States of America. T.A. Toomes would take up the last-place position due to problems with his gasket on lap 121.

Paul Goldsmith, Tiny Lund and Buck Baker would dominate the laps prior to the accident. The victory of Buck Baker over second-place finisher Curtis Turner would demonstrate the power of the 1957 Chevrolet. Although its real-life counterpart had fuel injection, the NASCAR version had to use a carburetor. Fuel injection did not become legal in what is now known as the Monster Energy NASCAR Cup Series until the 2012 season.

Individual race earnings for this event ranged from the winner's share of $3,170 ($36,339 when adjusted for inflation) to the last-place finisher's share of $125 ($1,433 when adjusted for inflation). A grand total of $12,240 was handed out by NASCAR officials for the explicit purpose of paying off the qualifying drivers ($140,310 when adjusted for inflation). Jess Potter was the only notable crew chief to take part in the race, leading the pit road crew of Brownie King's Chevrolet.

=== Qualifying ===
Grid	No.	Driver	Manufacturer	Owner	Time	Avg. Speed
1	3	Paul Goldsmith	'57 Ford	Smokey Yunick	27.400	65.693
2	46	Speedy Thompson	'57 Chevrolet	Hugh Babb	27.440	65.598
3	55	Tiny Lund	'57 Pontiac	A.L. Bumgarner	27.500	65.454
4	50	Tom Pistone	'57 Chevrolet	Hugh Babb	27.520	65.407
5	98	Marvin Panch	'57 Ford	Pete DePaolo	27.530	65.383
6	14	Billy Myers	'57 Mercury	Bill Stroppe	27.620	65.170
7	22	Fireball Roberts	'57 Ford	Pete DePaolo	27.710	64.958
8	42	Lee Petty	'57 Oldsmobile	Petty Enterprises	27.720	64.935
9	88	Ralph Earnhardt	'57 Oldsmobile	Petty Enterprises	27.890	64.539
10	99	Curtis Turner	'57 Ford	Pete DePaolo	27.950	64.401
11	64	Johnny Allen	'57 Plymouth	Spook Crawford	28.010	64.263
12	47	Jack Smith	'57 Chevrolet	Hugh Babb	28.070	64.125
13	29	Russ Hepler	'57 Pontiac	Howard Coulter	28.080	64.102
14	87	Buck Baker	'57 Chevrolet	Hugh Babb	28.280	63.649
15	6	Cotton Owens	'57 Pontiac	Ray Nichels	28.450	63.269
16	32	Brownie King	'56 Chevrolet	Jess Potter	29.650	60.708
17	421	T.A. Toomes	'56 Dodge	C.M. Julian	29.750	60.504
18	881	Jim Linke*	Oldsmobile	Petty Enterprises	30.090	59.820
19	76	George Green	'56 Chevrolet	Lonnie Fish	30.180	59.642
20	74	L.D. Austin	'56 Chevrolet	L.D. Austin	30.280	59.445
21	94	Clarence DeZalia	'56 Ford	Clarence DeZalia	0.000	0.000
22	28	Eddie Skinner	'57 Ford	Eddie Skinner	0.000	0.000
23	24	Barney Oldfield	'56 Ford	Rat Garner	0.000	0.000
24	17	Jim Paschal	'57 Mercury	Bill Stroppe	0.000	0.000
25	71	Bill Bowman	'56 Chevrolet	Bill Bowman	0.000	0.000
Failed to qualify
	11	Emanuel Zervakis	Chevrolet	Emanuel Zervakis	0.000	0.000
	35	Bill Champion	Ford	Bill Champion	0.000	0.000
	80	Frank Jamison	Chevrolet	Frank Jamison	0.000	0.000
	154	Nace Mattingly	Ford	Nace Mattingly	0.000	0.000

Failed to qualify: Emanuel Zervakis (#11), Bill Champion (#35), Nace Mattingly (#154), Frank Jamison (#80)

*Withdrew.

== Timeline ==
Section reference:

- Start of race: Paul Goldsmith started the race with the pole position.
- Lap 55: Tiny Lund takes over the lead from Paul Goldsmith.
- Lap 121: Problems with the vehicle's head gasket made T.A. Toomes into the last-place finisher.
- Lap 128: Buck Baker takes over the lead from Tiny Lund.
- Lap 145: Billy Myers takes over the lead from Buck Baker.
- Lap 146: The rear end of Eddie Skinner's vehicle became problematic, forcing him to quit the race.
- Lap 211: Cotton Owens had a terminal crash; causing him to withdraw from the event.
- Lap 233: Buck Baker takes over the lead from Billy Myers.
- Lap 281: Tiny Lund's engine developed problems, forcing him to make an early exit from the race.
- Lap 329: Billy Myers takes over the lead from Buck Baker.
- Lap 377: Johnny Allen noticed that his vehicle's clutch had some issues, causing him to pull over and end his hopes of winning the race.
- Lap 441: Tom Pistone and Billy Myers crashed into each other, jointly ending their chances of winning the race.
- Finish: Buck Baker was declared the winner after starting the event in 14th place.

== Finishing order ==
Section reference:

Fin	St	#	Driver	Make	Team/Owner	Sponsor	Laps	Led	Status	Pts	Winnings
1	14	87	Buck Baker	'57 Chevrolet	Hugh Babb		441	113	running	500	$3,170
2	10	99	Curtis Turner	'57 Ford	Pete DePaolo	DePaolo Engineering	441	0	running	480	$1,770
3	4	50	Tom Pistone	'57 Chevrolet	Hugh Babb		441	0	crash	460	$1,125
4	6	14	Billy Myers	'57 Mercury	Bill Stroppe		441	201	crash	440	$980
5	8	42	Lee Petty	'57 Oldsmobile	Petty Enterprises		440	0	running	420	$675
6	12	47	Jack Smith	'57 Chevrolet	Hugh Babb		436	0	running	400	$500
7	1	3	Paul Goldsmith	'57 Ford	Smokey Yunick	Smokey's Best Damn Garage	432	54	running	380	$475
8	5	98	Marvin Panch	'57 Ford	Pete DePaolo	DePaolo Engineering	431	0	running	360	$400
9	7	22	Fireball Roberts	'57 Ford	Pete DePaolo	DePaolo Engineering	427	0	running	340	$300
10	23	17	Jim Paschal	'57 Mercury	Bill Stroppe		416	0	running	320	$300
11	2	46	Speedy Thompson	'57 Chevrolet	Hugh Babb		409	0	running	300	$275
12	16	32	Brownie King	'56 Chevrolet	Jess Potter		404	0	running	280	$200
13	9	88	Ralph Earnhardt	'57 Oldsmobile	Petty Enterprises		391	0	running	260	$200
14	19	74	L.D. Austin	'56 Chevrolet	L.D. Austin		391	0	running	240	$200
15	18	76	George Green	'56 Chevrolet	Lonnie Fish		388	0	running	220	$200
16	11	64	Johnny Allen	'57 Plymouth	Spook Crawford		377	0	clutch	200	$200
17	24	71	Bill Bowman	'56 Chevrolet	Bill Bowman		363	0	running	180	$175
18	22	24	Barney Oldfield	'56 Ford	Rat Garner		356	0	running	160	$150
19	20	94	Clarence DeZalia	'56 Ford	Clarence DeZalia		351	0	running	140	$150
20	3	55	Tiny Lund	'57 Pontiac	A.L. Bumgarner		281	73	engine	120	$295
21	13	29	Russ Hepler	'57 Pontiac	Howard Coulter		270	0	bearing	100	$125
22	15	6	Cotton Owens	'57 Pontiac	Ray Nichels		211	0	crash	80	$125
23	21	28	Eddie Skinner	'57 Ford	Eddie Skinner		146	0	rear end	60	$125
24	17	421	T.A. Toomes	'56 Dodge	C.M. Julian		121	0	gasket	40	$125
Failed to qualify
		11	Emanuel Zervakis	Chevrolet	Emanuel Zervakis						
		35	Bill Champion	Ford	Bill Champion						
		80	Frank Jamison	Chevrolet	Frank Jamison						
		154	Nace Mattingly	Ford	Nace Mattingly						
WD		881	Jim Linke	Oldsmobile	Petty Enterprises						

Preceded by 1956	Virginia 500 races 1957	Succeeded by 1958
