= 1960 Daytona 500 =

Auto race run in Florida in 1960

Race details
- Race 5 of 44 in the 1960 NASCAR Grand National Series
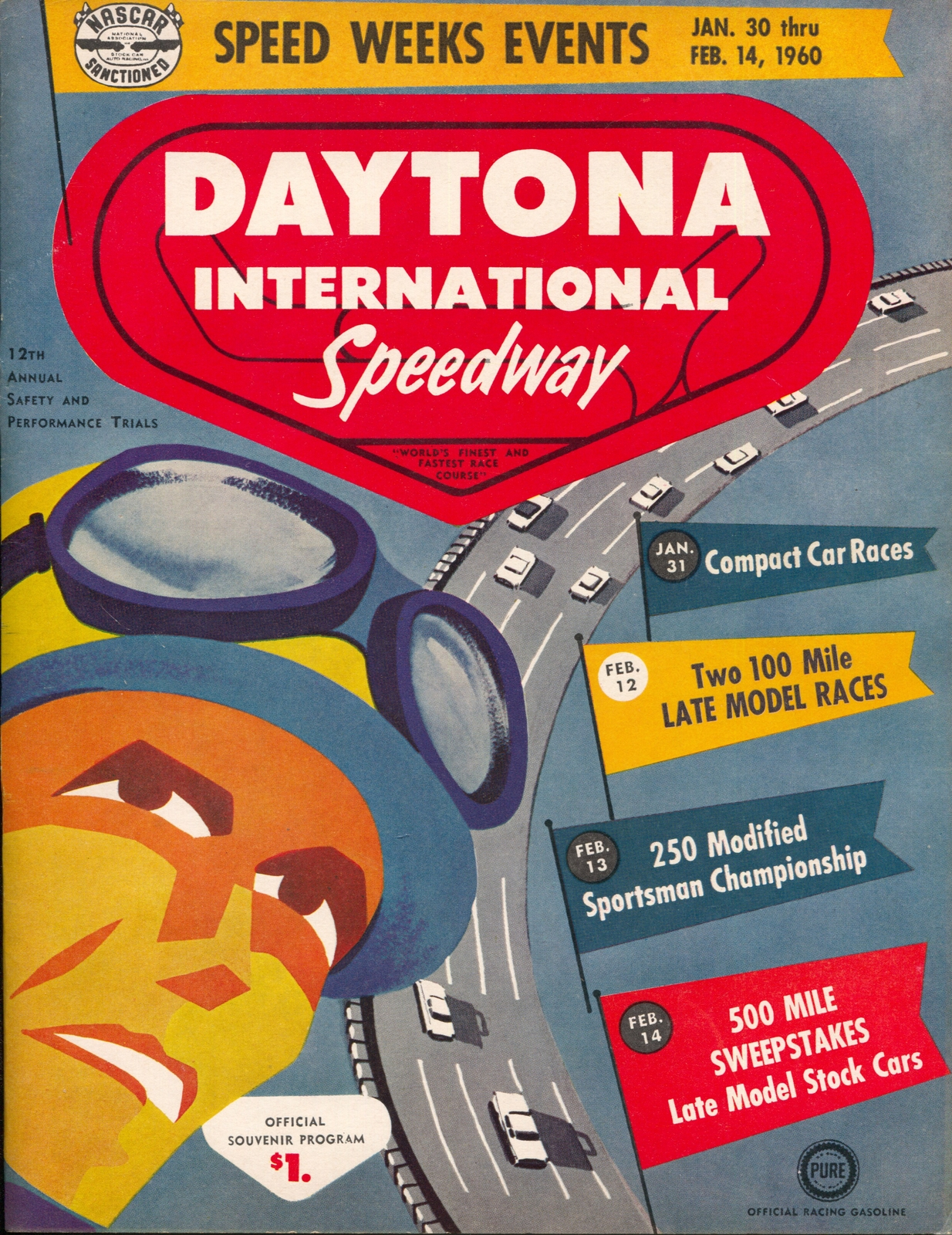
- 1960 Daytona 500 program cover
- Date: February 14, 1960
- Location: Daytona International Speedway; Daytona Beach, Florida, U.S.
- Course: Permanent racing facility 2.5 mi (4.023 km)
- Distance: 200 laps, 500 mi (800 km)
- Weather: Chilly with temperatures of 61 °F (16 °C); wind speeds of 31 miles per hour (50 km/h)
- Average speed: 124.74 miles per hour (200.75 km/h)

Pole position
Driver	Cotton Owens	Cotton Owens

Most laps led
Driver	Junior Johnson	John Masoni
- Laps: 67

Winner
No. 27	Junior Johnson	John Masoni

The 1960 Daytona 500 was a NASCAR Grand National Series stock car race that was held on February 14, 1960, at Daytona International Speedway in Daytona Beach, Florida, United States. It was the 5th race of the 1960 season, and was won by Junior Johnson in a 1959 Chevrolet.

== Summary ==
The 200 lap race started with Cotton Owens on the pole and Jack Smith joining him on the front row. Junior Johnson won the four hour race driving a 59 Chevy owned by John Masoni. A crowd of 38,775 watched as Johnson drove the number 27 to victory after starting in the 9th position.

Bud Burdick, Pappy Crane, Dick Foley, Dick Freeman, Tommy Herbert, Dave Hirschfield, Bob Kosiski, Shep Langdon and Bill Lutz would retire from NASCAR after this event.

=== Pre-race ===
In late January 1960, the CBS network sent anchorman Bud Palmer and 50 other employees to Daytona to cover the events in the first-ever televised coverage of a NASCAR event. CBS announced that their CBS Sports Spectacular show would televise a couple compact car races and the Grand National Pole Position races at Daytona on January 31. On February 13 a Modified-Sportsman race took place. NASCAR officials lined up 73 cars to take the green flag. Less than a minute and a half after the green flag flew, mayhem ensued when Dick Foley's Chevy got out of shape. While Foley was able to gather control of his car, and finish the race in tenth place, 37 other vehicles behind him crashed while attempting to avoid the confusion. Twelve cars flipped, and a total of 24 drivers were unable to continue the race. Five ambulances responded to transport 8 drivers to local hospitals. Four drivers were released that day, and four drivers were held overnight. Notable drivers Ralph Earnhardt, Wendell Scott, and Speedy Thompson were among those forced out of the race. Driver Speedy Thompson was quoted as saying

It was the worst accident I've ever seen. It's just a miracle that no-one got hurt any worse than they did

It took cleaning crews and tow trucks only 39 minutes to clear the track for the restart. Marion "Bubba" Farr went on to win the record setting crash fest. He drove a 1956 Ford modified with a 1958 Lincoln engine and 6 carburetors, and finished with an average speed of 116 mph (187 km/h).

=== Qualifying races ===
Fireball Roberts won the first 100-mile (160 km) qualifying race, and Jack Smith won the second on the 2.5-mile (4.0 km) track. Roberts grabbed his victory on the paved oval completing the 40 laps in 45 minutes, with two cautions in a 1960 Pontiac. Roberts started second beside Cotton Owens who won the pole with a speed of 149 mph (240 km/h). Owens finished second, and Fred Lorenzen rounded out the top 3 with 2 cautions for 5 laps. The first caution came on lap 1 when Gene White, Dave Hirschfield, and Tommy Irwin all got together coming out of turn two. Irwin and his Ford Thunderbird took a trip into lake Lloyd located in the infield, and Irwin had to swim to safety as the car was nearly submerged. By the time the yellow flag had been displayed, Roberts had already advanced to the front of the pack, and would never relinquish the lead. The win would give Roberts his 22nd NASCAR victory.

Smith and his 1960 Pontiac captured the victory from the pole with a qualifying speed of 148 mph (238 km/h), and completed the second race in just over 40 minutes with an average speed of 146.5 mph (235.8 km/h). There were 2 cautions; and Bobby Johns finished second with Jim Reed grabbing the third spot. The first single lap caution came when John Rostek spun on lap six, and the second caution, also a one lap slow down, came when Johnny Dodd Jr. crashed into the wall on lap 15. The dubious distinction of bringing out the first ever black flag fell to Herman "Turtle" Beam on lap 8 when officials noticed that Beam was running without his safety helmet, which he had forgotten on the starting grid. Smith set a record for the time by winning with the combination of his speed, and the minimal caution laps. The win was Smith's second of the year, and 12,500 people looked on as he and Roberts grabbed the two top spots in the qualifying races.

=== Race ===
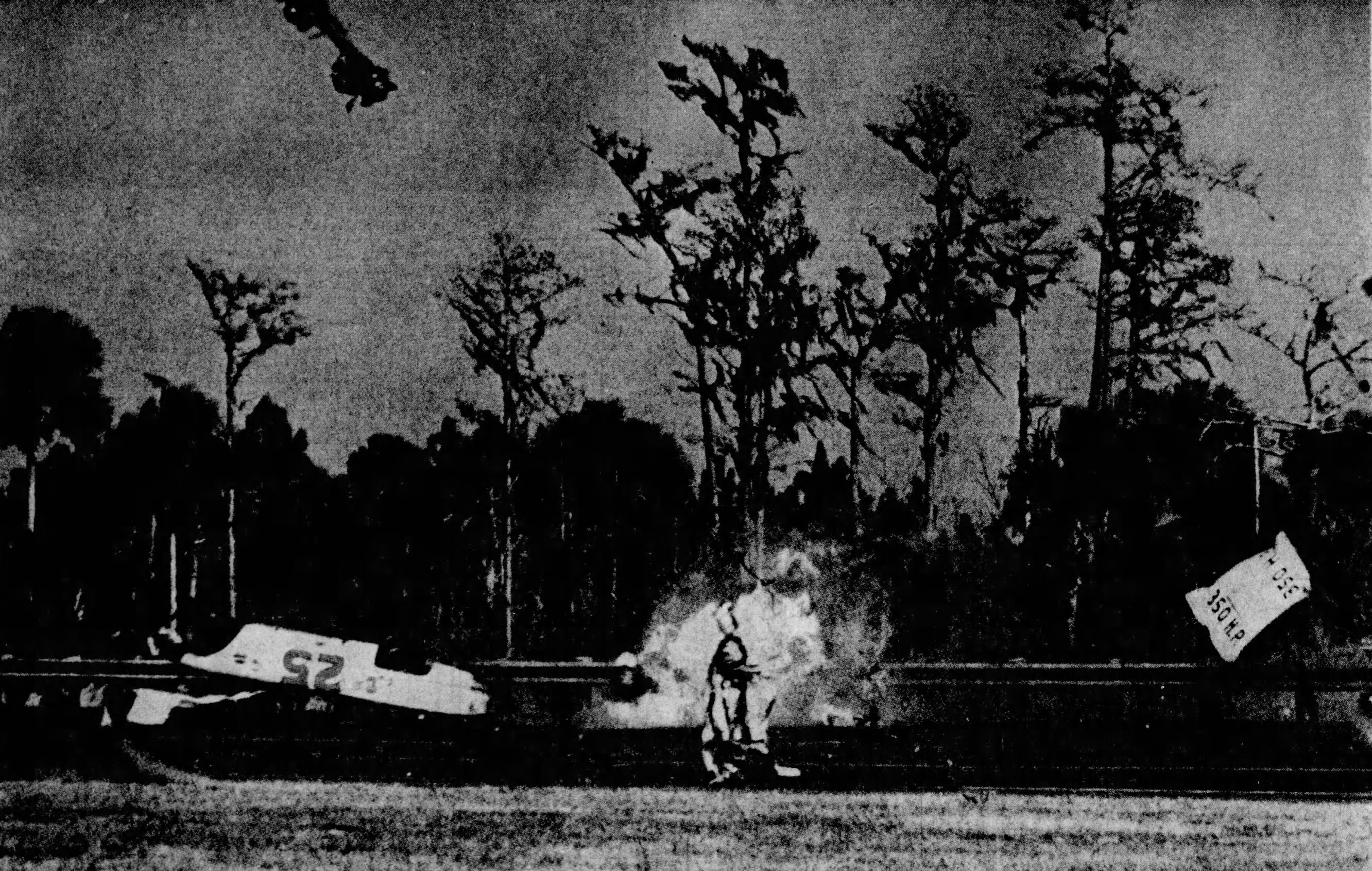
Herbert's car flipping and disintegrating

Race day was a brisk day with a high of 61 °F (16 °C), with steady winds at 31 miles per hour (50 km/h), strong gusts, and no rain. The high winds, combined with the high speeds resulted in 32 laps being run under caution, and multiple crashes. Tommy Herbert suffered a broken arm and severe eye injury when his T-bird flipped and blew apart when he crashed into the wall on the back straightaway on lap 118. The engine went one direction, the car another, and the front end assembly took flight up to 75 feet in the air. Driving through the wreckage, Pappy Crane spun, then rolled his Chevy, but was not hurt. Also included in the attrition was George Green whose car burst into flame forcing him to leap from the car to safety, and Tom Pistone who lost control with 2 laps remaining and hit the turn 4 wall. Junior Johnson took the lead with nine laps remaining when Bobby Johns spun, and Johnson went on to win the race. Johns had grabbed the lead on lap 172, but the winds pulled his back window out, and he lost control. The win was Johnson's first victory of the season.

The 1960 race is remembered as being the slowest Daytona 500 race in history, as Johnson averaged just 124 mph (200 km/h) over the 500 miles (800 km).

=== Legacy ===
There were so many cars destroyed or damaged during the 500 that NASCAR officials felt compelled to cancel a couple races that were scheduled for the following weekend. Palmetto Speedway and Hollywood Speedway both lost their scheduled 100-mile (160 km) events due to the carnage at Daytona.

Race winner Junior Johnson went on to achieve multiple accolades in the following years; including being inducted into the International Motorsports Hall of Fame in 1990 and being selected as one of NASCAR's 50 Greatest Drivers in 1998. On February 4, 2010, NASCAR announced that Johnson would be Grand Marshal for the 50th anniversary of his 1960 victory.

Part of Johnson's duties as Grand Marshal would be to utter the immortal words "Gentleman, start your engines" at the 52nd running of the Daytona 500 on February 14, 2010.

== Official results ==
The race lasted 4:00:30, with an average speed of 124.74 mph (200.75 km/h).

Fin	St	#	Driver	Sponsor	Make	Team	Laps	Led	Status	Pts	Winnings
1	9	27	Junior Johnson	Daytona Kennel	1959 Chevrolet	John Masoni	200	67	running		19600
2	4	3	Bobby Johns	Stephens Pontiac	1959 Pontiac	Jim Stephens	200	22	running		8600
3	19	43	Richard Petty		1960 Plymouth	Petty Enterprises	200	29	running		6450
4	14	42	Lee Petty		1960 Plymouth	Petty Enterprises	200	14	running		3650
5	11	69	Johnny Allen	Hanley Dawson Chevrolet	1960 Chevrolet	Hanley Dawson	199	0	running		3300
6	54	11	Ned Jarrett	Aldridge Motor Co.	1960 Ford	Ned Jarrett	199	0	running		2075
7	53	26	Curtis Turner	Courtesy Ford	1960 Ford	Holman-Moody	199	0	running		1650
8	5	28	Fred Lorenzen	Rupert Safety Belt	1960 Ford	Fred Lorenzen	198	0	running		1150
9	8	4	Rex White	Piedmont, Friendly	1960 Chevrolet		198	9	running		925
10	15	85	Emanuel Zervakis	Shook's Transfer	1960 Chevrolet		197	0	running		800
11	18	73	Bud Burdick	KSTP-TV	1959 T-Bird		197	0	running		600
12	52	59	Tom Pistone	Thor	1960 Chevrolet		196	26	crash		500
13	10	49	Bob Welborn	Atlanta International Raceway	1960 Chevrolet		195	0	running		400
14	6	7	Jim Reed	Jim Reed's Garage	1960 Chevrolet		195	0	running		350
15	20	29	Bob Potter		1960 Chevrolet		195	0	running		350
16	12	48	Darrell Dake	Atlanta International Raceway	1960 Chevrolet		195	0	running		325
17	31	63	Whitey Gerken	Skinner Bros.	1959 Pontiac		195	0	running		325
18	29	87	Buck Baker	Don Allen Chevrolet, Albright Boats	1960 Chevrolet		194	0	running		300
19	22	93	Banjo Matthews	Sunbeam Systems	1959 T-Bird	Banjo Matthews	193	0	running		375
20	28	64	Shep Langdon	Lafayette Motor Sales	1960 Ford		192	0	running		300
21	38	54	Jimmy Pardue	Lowe's	1959 Dodge		192	0	running		200
22	60	76	Larry Frank	Thor	1959 Chevrolet		191	0	running		200
23	2	47	Jack Smith	Boomershine	1960 Pontiac		191	14	running		900
24	50	99	Wilbur Rakestraw		1960 Ford		189	0	running		200
25	25	61	Joe Caspolich	Jones Motor Co.	1959 T-Bird		188	0	running		200
26	61	41	Gene White	Pat Milliken Ford	1960 Ford		187	0	running		200
27	34	56	Ken Johnson	Nypenn	1960 Ford		186	0	running		200
28	33	67	David Pearson	W.M. Mason Motor Co.	1959 Chevrolet		185	0	running		200
29	16	71	Gene Marmor	Skinner Bros.	1959 Pontiac		184	0	running		200
30	37	1	Brownie King	Faircloth Chevy Co.	1960 Chevrolet		183	0	running		200
31	27	34	G.C. Spencer	Westhair Engineering	1959 Chevrolet		183	0	running		200
32	62	19	Herman Beam	Carter County Motor Co.	1960 Ford		175	0	running		200
33	49	33	Reb Wickersham	Flying Rebel Racing Team	1960 Oldsmobile		175	0	running		700
34	63	74	L.D. Austin		1958 Chevrolet		175	0	running		100
35	30	16	Dick Joslin	Leppere Pontiac	1959 Pontiac		171	0	running		200
36	35	35	Mel Larson	Sun City	1960 Pontiac		166	0	running		275
37	65	14	Paul Parks	Arlington Ford Sales	1960 Ford		164	0	running		200
38	56	24	Arnold Gardner		1960 Ford		160	0	running		300
39	21	39	Herb Tillman	Stark Special	1960 Chevrolet		155	0	running		200
40	1	6	Cotton Owens	Hedge's Pontiac	1960 Pontiac		149	0	transmission		200
41	7	12	Joe Weatherly	Courtesy Ford	1960 Ford		146	0	crankshaft		300
42	43	8	Dick Dixon		1960 Chevrolet		144	0	crash		200
43	45	78	Roy Tyner	Tuxedo Plumbing Co.	1960 Chevrolet		143	0	crash		200
44	36	30	Bob Kosiski	Air Lift	1959 T-Bird		125	0			200
45	48	25	Tommy Herbert	Air Lift	1960 Ford		118	0	crash		200
46	51	98	Marvin Panch	Courtesy Ford, Air Port Auto	1960 Ford		117	0	oil leak		300
47	41	60	Jim Whitman	Polytronics Lab Inc.	1960 Dodge		116	0	engine		700
48	26	15	Johnny Sudderth	Crossroads Motel	1960 Ford		110	0	engine		200
49	59	13	Harold Smith	Florida Military School	1960 Plymouth		94	0	engine		200
50	67	58	Pappy Crane		1959 Chevrolet		89	0	crash		200
51	64	45	Tiny Lund		1960 Oldsmobile		83	0	steering		100
52	55	10	Elmo Langley	Cafe Burgundy	1959 Buick		77	0	crankshaft		275
53	58	44	Bill Lutz	Wynn's Friction Proofing	1960 Ford		75	0	engine		250
54	44	97	Parnelli Jones	Vel's Ford	1960 Ford		73	0	engine		200
55	46	32	George Green	Watauga Chevrolet	1958 Chevrolet		67	0	fire		200
56	39	88	Red Farmer	Kenny Hannan Ford	1960 Ford		65	0			200
57	3	22	Fireball Roberts	Gilman Pontiac	1960 Pontiac		51	19	engine		400
58	42	95	Bob Duell	Midtown Motors	1960 Ford		50	0	engine		200
59	24	70	Elmo Henderson	Jack Purser's Esso Service	1958 Pontiac		31	0	windshield		200
60	13	53	Bob Burdick		1960 Ford		31	0			275
61	23	66	Dick Foley		1959 Chevrolet	Dick Foley	30	0			200
62	17	94	Speedy Thompson	Warrior Motel	1960 Ford	Banjo Matthews	28	0	engine		200
63	66	2	Dave Hirschfield		1960 Buick		21	0	axle		100
64	57	77	Joe Lee Johnson	Tuxedo Plumbing Co.	1960 Ford		18	0	engine		200
65	68	92	Charley Griffith	Webster Garage	1960 Ford		14	0			100
66	40	51	Burrhead Nantz	W.P. Still Oldsmobile	1959 Oldsmobile		11	0	clutch		200
67	32	52	Sal Tovella	Fergus Ford	1960 Ford		5	0	engine		200
68	47	50	Dick Freeman	Razz Bowen Ford	1960 Ford	Dick Freeman	5	0	crash		200
Failed to qualify
		5	Chuck Scharf		Ford						
		9	Carl Burris		Ford						
		18	Fritz Wilson		Ford						
		31	Johnny Beauchamp		Ford	Holman-Moody					
		36	Tommy Irwin		Ford						
		38	Eddie Gray		Ford						
		75	John Dodd, Jr.		Ford						
		79	Buzz McCann		Ford						
		86	Johnny Dollar		Chevrolet						
		90	Runt Harris		Ford						
		96	John Rostek		Ford						
