= Daytona 500 =

Auto race held in Daytona, Florida, United States

NASCAR Cup Series
- Venue: Daytona International Speedway
- Location: Daytona Beach, Florida, United States
- First race: 1959
- Distance: 500 mi (800 km)
- Laps: 200; Stages 1/2: 65 each Final stage: 70
- Previous names: Inaugural 500 Mile International Sweepstakes (1959); Second Annual 500 Mile International Sweepstakes (1960); Daytona 500 presented by STP (1991–1993); Daytona 500 presented by Dodge (2001); Daytona 500 presented by Toyota (2007); Daytona 500 (1961–1990, 1994–2000, 2002–2006, 2008–present)
- Most wins (driver): Richard Petty (7)
- Most wins (team): Hendrick Motorsports (10)
- Most wins (manufacturer): Chevrolet (27)

Circuit information
- Surface: Asphalt
- Length: 2.5 mi (4.0 km)
- Turns: 4

The Daytona 500 is a 500-mile-long (805 km) NASCAR Cup Series motor race held annually at Daytona International Speedway in Daytona Beach, Florida. It is the first of two Cup races held every year at Daytona, the second being the Coke Zero Sugar 400, and one of three held in Florida, with the annual Season Finale 400 being held at Homestead south of Miami. From 1988 to 2019, it was one of the four restrictor plate races on the Cup schedule. The inaugural Daytona 500 was held in 1959 coinciding with the opening of the speedway and since 1982, it has been the season-opening race of the Cup Series.

The Daytona 500 is regarded as the most important and prestigious race on the NASCAR calendar, carrying by far the largest purse. Championship points awarded are equal to that of any other NASCAR Cup Series race. It is also the series' first race of the year; this phenomenon is unique in sports, which tend to have championships or other major events at the end of the season rather than the start. From 1995–2020, U.S. television ratings for the Daytona 500 were the highest for any auto race of the year, surpassing the traditional leader, the Indianapolis 500 which in turn greatly surpasses the Daytona 500 in gate attendance and international viewing. In 2021 the Indianapolis 500 surpassed the Daytona 500 in TV ratings and viewership. The 2006 Daytona 500 attracted the sixth largest average live global TV audience of any sporting event that year with 20 million viewers. As of 2026, the capacity is 102,000.

The race serves as the final event of Speedweeks and is also known as "The Great American Race" or the "Super Bowl of Stock Car Racing". Since its inception, the race has been held in mid-to-late February. From 1971 to 2011, and again since 2018, the event has been as associated with Presidents Day weekend, falling usually on the third Sunday of February. Since 2022, it has been held one week after the Super Bowl, the same day as the NBA All-Star Game, and on eight occasions, it has been run on Valentine's Day.

Since 1997, the winner of the Daytona 500 has been presented with the Harley J. Earl Trophy in Victory Lane, and the winning car is displayed in race-winning condition for one year at Daytona 500 Experience, a museum and gallery adjacent to Daytona International Speedway.

== Origins ==
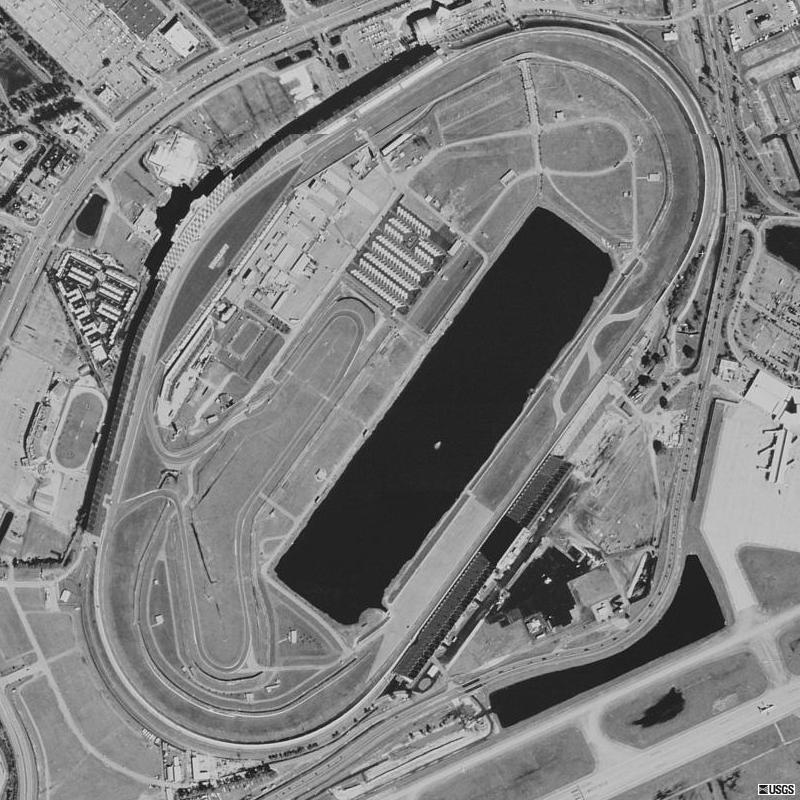
Aerial view of Daytona International Speedway

The race is the direct successor of shorter races held on the Daytona Beach Road Course. This long square was partially on the sand and also on the highway near the beach. Earlier events featured 200-mile (320 km) races with stock cars. A 500-mile (805 km) stock car race was held at Daytona International Speedway in 1959. It was the second 500-mile NASCAR race, following the annual Southern 500, and has been held every year since. By 1961, it began to be referred to as the Daytona 500, by which it is still commonly known.

Daytona International Speedway is 2.5 miles (4 km) long and a 500-mile race requires 200 laps to complete. However, the race was considered official after halfway (100 laps/250 miles) had been completed from 1959 to 2016. From 2017 to 2019, the race was considered official after the conclusion of Stage 2 (120 laps/300 miles) when stage-racing was introduced. In 2020, they revised the rule in which a race is considered official at either halfway or the conclusion of Stage 2 (whichever comes first, in this case halfway). The race has been shortened four times due to rain (in 1965, 1966, 2003, and 2009) and once in response to the energy crisis of 1974. Since the adaptation of the green–white–checkered finish rule in 2004, the race has gone past 500 miles on ten occasions (2005, 2006, 2007, 2010, 2011, 2012, 2015, 2018, 2019, 2020 and 2023). It took two attempts to finish the race in 2010, 2011, and 2020. The 2023 running is the longest Daytona 500 contested, lasting 212 laps/530 miles.

Tyler Reddick is the defending winner.

== History highlights ==
- 1959: Lee Petty, patriarch of the racing family, won the inaugural 500 Mile NASCAR International Sweepstakes at Daytona on February 22, 1959, defeating Johnny Beauchamp.
- 1960: Junior Johnson made use of the draft, then a little-understood phenomenon, to win while running a slower, year-old car in a field of 68 cars, the most in the history of the Daytona 500.
- 1961: First race to be called Daytona 500.
- 1965: The first rain-shortened Daytona 500. Fred Lorenzen was in the lead when the race was called on lap 133 of 200.
- 1966: Richard Petty becomes the first two-time winner, having previously won the 1964 race. Through 2024, only 12 drivers have won 2 or more Daytona 500s.
- 1967: Mario Andretti led 112 of the 200 laps including the last 33 to capture his first and only win in the Cup Series.
- 1968: For much of this race, both Cale Yarborough and (unrelated) LeeRoy Yarbrough traded the lead. With 5 laps to go, Cale made a successful slingshot pass on the third turn to take the lead from LeeRoy and never looked back as he won his first Daytona 500 by 1.3 seconds.
- 1969: Having learned from the previous year, LeeRoy Yarbrough would use the same slingshot treatment out of turn 3 on Charlie Glotzbach, to score the victory on the final lap.
- 1971: Richard Petty becomes the first three-time winner, including the 1964 and 1966 races. Through 2015, only 5 drivers have won 3 or more Daytona 500s.
- 1972: A. J. Foyt cruised into the lead on lap 80 and stayed there through the 200 lap race, lapping the entire field. Foyt beat second-place Charlie Glotzbach by nearly two laps, with Jim Vandiver finishing 6 laps down in third.
- 1973: Richard Petty becomes the first four-time winner, including the 1964, 1966, and 1971 races. Through 2015, only Petty (7 total) and Cale Yarborough have won at least 4 Daytona 500s.
- 1974: During the start of the 1974 NASCAR season, many races had their distance cut ten percent in response to the 1973 oil crisis. As a result, the 1974 Daytona 500 was shortened to 180 laps (450 miles), as symbolically, the race "started" on lap 21. Richard Petty became the first of only 4 drivers (as of 2021) to win consecutive Daytona 500s, while also setting a mark of 5 total wins.
- 1976: In the 1976 race, Richard Petty was leading on the last lap when he was passed on the backstretch by David Pearson. Petty tried to turn under Pearson coming off the final corner but didn't clear Pearson. The contact caused the drivers to spin into the grass in the infield just short of the finish line. Petty's car didn't start, but Pearson was able to keep his car running and limp over the finish line for the win.
- 1979: The 1979 race was the first Daytona 500 to be broadcast live on national television, airing on CBS, whose audience was increased in much of the Eastern and Midwestern USA due to a blizzard. (The Indianapolis 500 was only broadcast on tape delay that evening in this era; most races were broadcast only through the final quarter to half of the race, as was the procedure for ABC's Championship Auto Racing broadcasts; with the new CBS contract, the network and NASCAR agreed to a full live broadcast.) That telecast introduced in-car and low-level track-side cameras, which has now become standard in all sorts of automotive racing broadcasts. A final lap crash and subsequent fight between leaders Cale Yarborough and Donnie Allison (along with Donnie's brother Bobby) brought national (if unwelcome) publicity to NASCAR, with the added emphasis of a snowstorm that bogged down much of the northeastern part of the United States. Donnie Allison was leading the race on the final lap with Yarborough drafting him tightly. As Yarborough attempted a slingshot pass at the end of the backstretch, Allison attempted to block him. Yarborough refused to give ground and as he pulled alongside Allison, his left side tires left the pavement and went into the wet and muddy infield grass. Yarborough lost control of his car and contacted Allison's car halfway down the backstretch. As both drivers tried to regain control, their cars made contact several more times before finally locking together and crashing into the outside wall in turn three. After the cars settled in the grass, Donnie Allison and Yarborough began to argue. After they had talked it out, Bobby Allison, who was lapped at that point, pulled over, began defending his brother, and a fight broke out. Richard Petty, who was over half a lap behind at the time, went on to win; with the brawl in the infield, the television audience scarcely noticed. The story was the talk of the water cooler the next day, even making the front page of The New York Times Sports section.
- 1980: Buddy Baker won the fastest Daytona 500 in history before the introduction of mandatory stage cautions in 2017, at 177.602 mph (285.809 km/h).
- 1981: Richard Petty becomes the first seven-time winner, three wins more than the second-highest multiple winner, Cale Yarborough. With wins in 1964, 1966, 1971, 1973, 1974, and 1979, Petty is the only driver to win in three different decades.
- 1982: The Daytona 500 becomes the opening race in the NASCAR season, a position held since. Bobby Allison wins his second Daytona 500 but many people consider this a controversial win because on lap 3 Bobby Allison's rear bumper broke away from the car (later it was discovered that it was welded on purpose by a wire welder) and caused a pileup further behind the leaders. Without a rear bumper, Allison's car gained an aerodynamic advantage and won the race by just over twenty-two seconds.
- 1983: Cale Yarborough was the first driver to run a qualifying lap over 200 mph (320 km/h) in his Chevrolet Monte Carlo; only to crash out during the second qualifying lap. Yarborough raced in a backup Pontiac LeMans displayed at a nearby Hardee's (Yarborough's sponsor) and took the backup car to his 3rd Daytona 500 victory. This would also be the final time a driver won a Daytona 500 in a Pontiac.
- 1984: Cale Yarborough completed a lap of 201.848 mph (324.843 km/h), officially breaking the 200 mph (320 km/h) barrier at Daytona. He joined Richard Petty as the only drivers to win the race in consecutive years and to win the race four times overall.
- 1985: Bill Elliott dominated the race, and by lap 140, was close to lapping the entire field. During a pit stop, NASCAR officials held him in the pit area in order to repair a supposed broken headlight assembly. The two-minute pit stop dropped him to third, barely clinging to the lead lap. Elliott made up the deficit and survived a late-race caution and a final lap restart to win his first Daytona 500. Elliott would go on to win the first Winston Million.
- 1986: The race that came down to a two-car duel between Dale Earnhardt and Geoff Bodine. With 3 laps to go, Earnhardt was forced to make a pit stop for a "splash 'n go". However, as Earnhardt left the pits, he burned a piston, allowing Bodine to cruise to victory.
- 1987: Winner Bill Elliott qualified for the pole position at an all-time Daytona record of 210.364 mph (338.532 km/h). Bill Elliott dominated much of the race, leading 104 of the 200 laps. During two different points in the race, he pulled away from the other leaders and was all by himself on the track, leading the first 35 laps, 29 in a row at another point, and the last three.
- 1988: Restrictor plates were mandated to reduce dangerously high speeds at Daytona. This race was remembered for two things. First, Richard Petty's rollover crash in the tri-oval on lap 106, initiated when he was tagged from behind by Phil Barkdoll. Petty rolled over about eight times and was then hit by Brett Bodine. The wreck also collected 1972 race winner A. J. Foyt, Eddie Bierschwale, and Alan Kulwicki. All of the drivers, including Petty, walked away. Second, Bobby Allison and his son Davey finished one-two and celebrated together in Victory Lane, making Bobby Allison the oldest driver to win the Daytona 500.
- 1989: Darrell Waltrip stretches his final tank of fuel for 53 laps to win in his 17th try.
- 1990: Dale Earnhardt appeared headed for certain victory until the closing laps. On lap 193, Geoff Bodine spun in the first turn, causing the third and final caution of the race. All of the leaders pitted except Derrike Cope, who stayed out to gain track position. On the lap 195 restart, Earnhardt re-took the lead. On the final lap, going into turn three, he ran over a bell housing from the blown engine of Rick Wilson's car. He blew a tire, allowing the relatively unknown Cope to slip by and take his first career win in a major upset.
- 1991: Dale Earnhardt's Daytona 500 frustrations continued as Ernie Irvan passed Earnhardt with six laps to go to. Ultimately, Earnhardt - who was battling issues with the car temperature after striking a seagull early in the race - spun with two laps remaining and collected Davey Allison and Kyle Petty. Irvan took the win as the race ended under the caution flag. The race was dominated by complex pit stop rules, implemented to improve safety in the pit area.
- 1992: Davey Allison dominated the second half en route to his lone Daytona 500 victory. He avoided a major wreck on lap 92 and went on to lead the final 102 laps.
- 1993: In a frightening wreck on lap 170, Rusty Wallace flipped over multiple times on the back straightaway. With two laps to go, Dale Earnhardt was leading Jeff Gordon and Dale Jarrett. Jarrett battled into the lead with one lap to go. It was the fourth time Earnhardt had been leading the Daytona 500 with less than ten laps to go but failed to win.
- 1994: Sterling Marlin gambled on fuel and was able to complete the final 59 laps without stopping, to win his first career Cup victory. During Speedweeks, two drivers, Neil Bonnett and Rodney Orr, died during separate practice accidents. Also, Loy Allen became the first rookie to start the Daytona 500 on the pole.
- 1995: Sterling Marlin became the first driver since Cale Yarborough, and only third overall, to win back-to-back Daytona 500s. It was the third win in five years for Morgan–McClure Motorsports (1991, 1994, 1995).
- 1996: Dale Jarrett won his second Daytona 500 in four years, again holding off Dale Earnhardt, who finished second for the third time in four years.
- 1997: Jeff Gordon became the youngest winner of the event to that point at the age of 25 in a three-way finish under caution with Hendrick Motorsports teammates Terry Labonte and Ricky Craven finishing second and third. Dale Earnhardt's Daytona "curse" continued as, while contending for the lead with 12 laps to go, he was involved in a rollover crash on the backstretch, though after observing from an ambulance that his car was still relatively intact, got back in and finished the race in 31st.
- 1998: Dale Earnhardt finally won the Daytona 500 after "20 years of trying, 20 years of frustration." Though Earnhardt had usually been a strong competitor in the Daytona 500, mechanical problems, crashes, or other misfortunes had prevented him from winning.
- 1999: Jeff Gordon accomplished the feat of winning the pole and the race marking the first time since 1987 when Bill Elliott did this.
- 2000: Dale Jarrett avenged his previous year's rollover accident by winning the 1999 season championship & 2000 500 which was the final 500 broadcast for CBS.
- 2001: Also known as "Black Sunday" or the "darkest day in NASCAR", as Dale Earnhardt died in a crash on the final lap. Michael Waltrip and Dale Earnhardt Jr. were running first and second on the final lap, while Earnhardt Sr. was third. In turn 4, Earnhardt lost control after making contact from Sterling Marlin and crashed into the outside wall, taking Ken Schrader with him. Earnhardt suffered a fatal basilar skull fracture. The death overshadowed Waltrip's first win, which came in his 463rd Cup Series race.
- 2003: Michael Waltrip became a two-time winner in the shortest ever Daytona 500 after the race was shortened to 109 laps due to rain.
- 2004: Dale Earnhardt Jr. won his first Daytona 500 in his fifth attempt, six years after his father accomplished the feat after 20 attempts. Defending winner Michael Waltrip was eliminated early when his car flipped over during the Big One.
- 2005: The start time was changed, allowing the race to finish under the lights at dusk. In the first use of the green-white-checkered finish rule in the Daytona 500, Gordon held off Kurt Busch, and Earnhardt Jr. to win his third Daytona 500. The race went 203 laps/507.5 miles.
- 2007: Running fifth with half a lap to go, Kevin Harvick picked up a push and surged to the front to nip Mark Martin by 0.02 seconds at the line. Most of the rest of the field crashed across the line as The Big One erupted behind them.
- 2008: The celebrated 50th running of the Daytona 500 was the first using NASCAR's Car of Tomorrow. It also marked the first race under the "Sprint Cup Series" banner, following the merger of Sprint with Nextel in 2006.
- 2010: The longest Daytona 500 distance until the 2020 event, 208 laps (520 miles (840 km)), due to requiring two green-white-checker efforts to finish the race. Jamie McMurray came home with the 2010 Daytona 500 victory. Dale Earnhardt Jr. finished second.
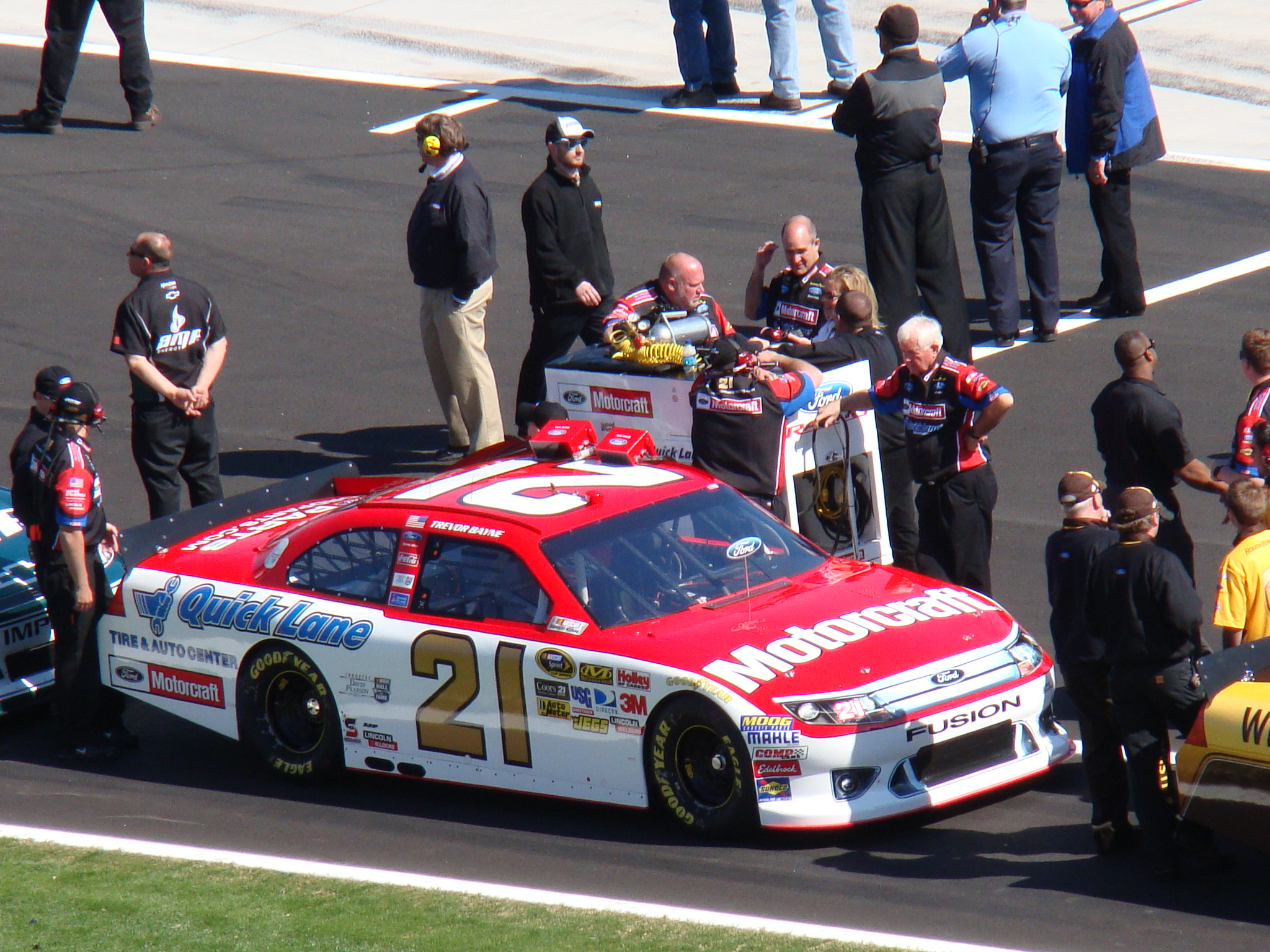
  Trevor Bayne, driving the No. 21 Ford for Wood Brothers Racing, won the 2011 Daytona 500.
- 2011: Since this race marked the tenth anniversary of the death of Dale Earnhardt, the third lap was a "silent lap", meaning the TV and radio announcers were silent during the entire lap, and fans held up three fingers in reference to Earnhardt's car number. Trevor Bayne, at 20 years and one day old, became the youngest Daytona 500 winner ever.
- 2012: While 2010 was the longest distance, 2012 was the longest time to complete the race. Scheduled for a 12 noon EST start on Sunday, rain delayed the race to Monday, then further delayed it to a 7 PM start that Monday night, resulting in the first primetime Daytona 500 start (but the third to reach primetime). On lap 160, Juan Pablo Montoya crashed into a jet dryer in turn 3, sparking a lengthy red flag as crews put out the resulting fire and repaired the damage. The race finally ended at approximately 1 AM EST Tuesday morning, 37 hours after the originally scheduled start, with Matt Kenseth becoming the first repeat winner since Jeff Gordon who won the 2005 race.
- 2013: There were a number of firsts. This was the first race with NASCAR's new redesigned Generation 6 body. Rookie Danica Patrick won the pole, becoming the first woman on pole in the Daytona 500 and also the first woman to finish among the Top 10. Jimmie Johnson earned his second Daytona 500 victory.
- 2014: For the second year in a row, a rookie won the pole position, in this case, Austin Dillon in his first ride in the newly renumbered #3 Chevy SS for Richard Childress Racing, the first time the #3 had been used in a NASCAR Cup Series race since Dale Earnhardt's death. Dale Earnhardt Jr., won his second Daytona 500, the third straight won by a past winner, after Kenseth in 2012 and Johnson in 2013. The race was delayed 6 hours, 22 minutes, and ended at 11:18 p.m. ET Sunday night.

The start of the 2015 Daytona 500

- 2015: Jeff Gordon won the pole for the final time. There were two big wrecks during the race, one with 19 laps to go for Justin Allgaier and Ty Dillon, brought out a red flag to ensue cleanup on the track, and one on lap 202 at a scheduled Green–white–checkered finish, Joey Logano won his first Daytona 500.
- 2016: Rookie Chase Elliott started the race from the pole position. Driver Denny Hamlin led 95 laps during the race, and on the last lap, Hamlin passed leader Matt Kenseth. Hamlin would then beat Martin Truex Jr. by 0.010 seconds, which would become the closest finish in the Daytona 500.
- 2017: The very first race in the era of stage caution breaks. Chase Elliott started the race from the pole for the second year in a row. Several big wrecks decimated the field but a long green run to the finish put everyone in fuel trouble. Kurt Busch won as Elliott, Martin Truex Jr., and Kyle Larson all ran out of fuel in the last four laps.
- 2018: 20 years after Dale Earnhardt earned his iconic victory at Daytona, Austin Dillon brought Richard Childress's #3 Chevrolet back to Victory Lane. Dillon, Childress's grandson, who was photographed next to Earnhardt as a child after the earlier win, led only the final lap, bumping leader Aric Almirola out of the way, sending the latter's Ford into the wall. Also of note, rookie Bubba Wallace finished in the runner-up spot, barely edging out 2016 winner Denny Hamlin, the highest finish for an African-American driver in the event's history. It was also the final NASCAR race for Danica Patrick, who was collected in a multi-car wreck near the end of the second stage that also ended the days of Chase Elliott, Brad Keselowski, Kevin Harvick, among others. This race was also the fastest Daytona 500 in the stages era.
- 2019: The last race to use traditional restrictor plates in NASCAR since 1988. William Byron started on the pole alongside Alex Bowman, making it the youngest front-row starters in Daytona 500 history. Kurt Busch was caught up in an early wreck after contact with Ricky Stenhouse Jr., collecting Jamie McMurray, Austin Dillon, and Bubba Wallace. Kyle Busch would win stage 1 and Ryan Blaney would win stage 2. Matt DiBenedetto, driving for Leavine Family Racing, would lead a race-high of 49 laps until he was caught up in "The Big One" with nine laps to go after contact with Paul Menard going into turn 3, collecting 18 cars in all. Two more wrecks occurring in the final 5 laps forced the race into overtime. Denny Hamlin escaped through all the late crashes and would go on to win his second Daytona 500 race in his career. Joe Gibbs earned his third Daytona 500 victory. Gibbs-owned Toyotas swept the top three spots, as Kyle Busch finished second and Erik Jones third. It was the second time in event history that one team took home the first three spots, and the first time since Hendrick Motorsports achieved the feat in 1997.
- 2020: Donald Trump is the second President of the United States to serve as Daytona 500 Grand Marshal (after George W. Bush in 2004), and the opening lap is paced by the official Presidential state car. Shortly after this, continuing rain showers caused the race to be postponed for one day, for the first time in eight years. Denny Hamlin won his third Daytona 500 the next day in the second-closest finish in race history, though the win was overshadowed by a horrific accident for Ryan Newman on the final lap, being sent to a nearby hospital.
- 2021: Much like 2011, this race also had a "silent lap" on lap 3. Ironically, Derrike Cope, the 1990 Daytona 500 winner making his final start, blew a tire on this lap headed into turn 3, much like how Dale Earnhardt blew a tire on the final lap of the aforementioned 500. On lap 14, a 16-car wreck occurred before the race was red-flagged due to rain. After a 5-hour 40 minute stoppage, at 9:07pm the race resumed with Denny Hamlin eventually winning both stages. On the last lap, which occurred after midnight, a big wreck occurred in turn 3 and Michael McDowell scored his first career Cup win.
- 2022: The first race with the Generation 7 "Next-Gen" car. On Lap 63, an eight-car wreck caused by Brad Keselowski, who now was a part owner at RFK Racing, would lead to rookie Harrison Burton flipping his car. Keselowski later turned Stenhouse Jr. with six laps to go in the race. Austin Cindric would hold off Bubba Wallace at the finish line to win the 500 in only his 8th Cup start, while also becoming the second youngest driver to win (behind Trevor Bayne).
- 2023: The 2023 Daytona 500 saw Ricky Stenhouse Jr. claim victory after a dramatic double-overtime finish. This win marked Stenhouse's first Daytona 500 victory and his third career Cup Series win. The race featured numerous lead changes and several multi-car wrecks, including a massive crash on Lap 118 and another big wreck in the final laps. These incidents led to the race going into double overtime. Joey Logano finished second, followed by Christopher Bell in third. Kyle Busch and Brad Keselowski also had strong runs but were involved in late-race incidents that impacted the final standings. Despite the chaos, Stenhouse managed to navigate through the wreckage and hold off Joey Logano to secure the win in a thrilling conclusion.

== Qualifying procedure ==
The qualifying procedure is unique for the Daytona 500. Some teams must race their way into the Daytona 500 field. The first row is set by a timed round of qualifying. Prior to 2021, the session was held one week before the race (prior to 2003, this was two rounds; prior to 2001, it was three) but the session is now held on the Wednesday evening leading up to the race. The remainder of the field is set on the Thursday before the race by two separate qualifying races (these were 100 miles (160 km) from 1959 to 1967; 125 miles (201 km) from 1969 to 2004; and 150 miles (240 km) with a two-lap overtime, if necessary, beginning in 2005 (these races were not held in 1968 due to rain)). The top two drivers from the qualifying races who were not in the top 35 in owner points were given spots on the field, and the rest of the field was set by the finishing order of the duels, with guaranteed spots to those in the top 35. The remaining spots, 40 to 43, were filled by top qualifying times of those not already in the field from the qualifying race. If there was a previous NASCAR champion without a spot, he would get one of those four spots, otherwise, the fourth-fastest car was added to the field.

Before 2005 – and beginning again in 2013 – after the top two cars were set, the top fourteen cars in the qualifying races advance to the field, and then between six (1998–2003), eight (1995–97, 2004) or 10 (until 1994) fastest cars which do not advance from the qualifying race are added, then cars in the top 35 in owner points not locked into the race, and then the driver with the championship provisional, except for 1985 when no such car was eligible for a provisional starting spot, the only time that happened in the Daytona 500 from when the provisional was added in 1976 through 2004.

== Television ==
The Daytona 500 was the first 500-mile (800 km) auto race to be televised live flag-to-flag on network television when CBS aired it in 1979, continuing to air until 2000.

From 2001 to 2006, the race alternated between Fox and NBC under the terms of a six–year, $2.48 billion NASCAR television contract, with Fox broadcasting the Daytona 500 in odd-numbered years (2001, 2003, 2005) and the Pepsi 400 in even-numbered years (2002, 2004, 2006) and NBC broadcasting the opposite race in that year.

In 2005, a new television contract was signed, which made Fox the sole broadcaster of the Daytona 500 for eight years, from 2007 to 2014. In 2013, 10 more years were added to the contract, giving Fox every Daytona 500 from 2015 to 2024 as well, for a total of at least 20 Daytona 500s in a row. The installation of the lighting system at Daytona International Speedway in 1998, as well as the implementations of the television packages in 2001 and 2007 respectively, have resulted in the race starting and ending much later than it did in the race's early years. The race started at 12:15 p.m. EST from 1979 until 2000. The start time was moved to 1:00 p.m EST from 2001 to 2004, 2:30 p.m. in 2005 and 2006, and 3:30 p.m. from 2007 to 2009, all for the convenience of west coast viewers. The 2005 race ended at sunset for the first time in its history, and the 2006 race ended well after sunset.

Every Daytona 500 between 2006 and 2010, as well as the 2012 and 2014 races, ended under the lights. The changing track conditions caused by the onset of darkness in the closing laps in these years forced the crew chiefs to predict the critical car setup adjustments needed for their final two pit stops. The 2007 race was the first Daytona 500 to go into prime-time, ending at 7:07 p.m. Eastern time. In 2010, the race moved back to a 1:00 p.m. start time, which should have resulted in it ending in daylight; however, two red flags caused by track surface issues led to long delays that pushed the race to 7:34 p.m. EST, pushing the race into prime-time for the second time. The 2012 race was also scheduled to start at 1:00 p.m. EST on Sunday, February 26, but heavy rain in the area caused the race to be postponed to 7:00 p.m. EST on Monday, February 27, making it the first Daytona 500 to be postponed to a Monday, as well as the first (and only) Daytona 500 to be run as a night race. Due to a two–hour red flag period after a jet dryer fire on the track with 40 laps remaining, the race did not end until about 12:40 a.m. on Tuesday, February 28. The 2013 race marked a return to the race's past tradition of ending in the late afternoon, as it ended at about 4:40 p.m., the race's earliest ending time since 2004. Although the 2014 race started around 1:30 p.m. EST, heavy rain and a tornado warning red–flagged the race after 38 laps and it was delayed for a record six hours and 22 minutes; the race finished the entire 500–mile distance around after 11:00 p.m. the same day, which effectively competed with the time-delayed East Coast broadcast of NBC's coverage of the 2014 Winter Olympics closing ceremony, scheduled between 7:00 and 10:30 p.m. The 2015 race started on time around 1:00 p.m., and ended after 203 laps due to a Green–white–checkered finish.

Rain delays forced the 2025 race to go on longer as well, with television coverage cutting into numerous Fox Animation Domination shows.

The television ratings for the Daytona 500 have surpassed those of the larger Indianapolis 500 (which has much larger physical attendance and international attendance) since 1995, even though the 1995 race was available in far fewer homes than the year before. Then-broadcaster CBS had lost well-established VHF (channels 2–13) affiliates in major markets as a result of the Fox affiliate switches of 1994. As an example, new affiliates WDJT in Milwaukee and WGNX in Atlanta — both cities that are home to NASCAR races — and WWJ in Detroit, close to Michigan International Speedway, were on the UHF band (channels 14–69), meaning that they had a significantly reduced broadcast area compared to former affiliates WITI, WAGA-TV, and WJBK, respectively. WDJT was not available in many Wisconsin markets by the time the Daytona 500 took place.

== List of Daytona 500 winners ==
For NASCAR Grand National winners at Daytona from 1949 to 1958, see Daytona Beach and Road Course.

Year	Date	No.	Driver	Team	Manufacturer	Distance		Race time	Average speed (mph)	Report	Ref
Year	Date	No.	Driver	Team	Manufacturer	Laps	Miles (Km)	Race time	Average speed (mph)	Report	Ref
1959	February 22	42	Lee Petty	Petty Enterprises	Oldsmobile	200	500 (804.672)	3:41:22	135.522	Report	
1960	February 14	27	Junior Johnson	John Masoni	Chevrolet	200	500 (804.672)	4:00:30	124.74	Report	
1961	February 26	20	Marvin Panch	Smokey Yunick	Pontiac	200	500 (804.672)	3:20:32	149.601	Report	
1962	February 18	22	Fireball Roberts	Jim Stephens	Pontiac	200	500 (804.672)	3:10:41	157.329	Report	
1963	February 24	21	Tiny Lund	Wood Brothers Racing	Ford	200	500 (804.672)	3:17:56	151.566	Report	
1964	February 23	43	Richard Petty	Petty Enterprises	Plymouth	200	500 (804.672)	3:14:23	154.334	Report	
1965	February 14	28	Fred Lorenzen	Holman Moody	Ford	133*	332.5 (535.106)	2:22:56	141.539	Report	
1966	February 27	43	Richard Petty	Petty Enterprises	Plymouth	198*	495 (796.625)	3:04:54	160.927	Report	
1967	February 26	11	Mario Andretti	Holman Moody	Ford	200	500 (804.672)	3:24:11	146.926	Report	
1968	February 25	21	Cale Yarborough	Wood Brothers Racing	Mercury	200	500 (804.672)	3:23:44	143.251	Report	
1969	February 23	98	LeeRoy Yarbrough	Junior Johnson & Associates	Ford	200	500 (804.672)	3:09:56	157.95	Report	
1970	February 22	40	Pete Hamilton	Petty Enterprises	Plymouth	200	500 (804.672)	3:20:32	149.601	Report	
1971	February 14	43	Richard Petty	Petty Enterprises	Plymouth	200	500 (804.672)	3:27:40	144.462	Report	
1972	February 20	21	A. J. Foyt	Wood Brothers Racing	Mercury	200	500 (804.672)	3:05:42	161.55	Report	
1973	February 18	43	Richard Petty	Petty Enterprises	Dodge	200	500 (804.672)	3:10:50	157.205	Report	
1974	February 17	43	Richard Petty	Petty Enterprises	Dodge	180*	450 (724.205)	3:11:38	140.894	Report	
1975	February 16	72	Benny Parsons	L.G. DeWitt	Chevrolet	200	500 (804.672)	3:15:15	153.649	Report	
1976	February 15	21	David Pearson	Wood Brothers Racing	Mercury	200	500 (804.672)	3:17:08	152.181	Report	
1977	February 20	11	Cale Yarborough	Junior Johnson & Associates	Chevrolet	200	500 (804.672)	3:15:48	153.218	Report	
1978	February 19	15	Bobby Allison	Bud Moore Engineering	Ford	200	500 (804.672)	3:07:49	159.73	Report	
1979	February 18	43	Richard Petty	Petty Enterprises	Oldsmobile	200	500 (804.672)	3:28:22	143.977	Report	
1980	February 17	28	Buddy Baker	Ranier-Lundy	Oldsmobile	200	500 (804.672)	2:48:55	177.602‡	Report	
1981	February 15	43	Richard Petty	Petty Enterprises	Buick	200	500 (804.672)	2:56:50	169.651	Report	
1982	February 14	88	Bobby Allison	DiGard Motorsports	Buick	200	500 (804.672)	3:14:49	153.991	Report	
1983	February 20	28	Cale Yarborough	Ranier-Lundy	Pontiac	200	500 (804.672)	3:12:20	155.979	Report	
1984	February 19	28	Cale Yarborough	Ranier-Lundy	Chevrolet	200	500 (804.672)	3:18:41	150.994	Report	
1985	February 17	9	Bill Elliott	Melling Racing	Ford	200	500 (804.672)	2:54:09	172.265	Report	
1986	February 16	5	Geoff Bodine	Hendrick Motorsports	Chevrolet	200	500 (804.672)	3:22:32	148.124	Report	
1987	February 15	9	Bill Elliott	Melling Racing	Ford	200	500 (804.672)	2:50:12	176.263	Report	
1988	February 14	12	Bobby Allison	Stavola Brothers Racing	Buick	200	500 (804.672)	3:38:08	137.531	Report	
1989	February 19	17	Darrell Waltrip	Hendrick Motorsports	Chevrolet	200	500 (804.672)	3:22:04	148.466	Report	
1990	February 18	10	Derrike Cope	Bob Whitcomb Racing	Chevrolet	200	500 (804.672)	3:00:59	165.761	Report	
1991	February 17	4	Ernie Irvan	Morgan–McClure Motorsports	Chevrolet	200	500 (804.672)	3:22:30	148.148	Report	
1992	February 16	28	Davey Allison	Robert Yates Racing	Ford	200	500 (804.672)	3:07:12	160.256	Report	
1993	February 14	18	Dale Jarrett	Joe Gibbs Racing	Chevrolet	200	500 (804.672)	3:13:35	154.972	Report	
1994	February 20	4	Sterling Marlin	Morgan–McClure Motorsports	Chevrolet	200	500 (804.672)	3:11:10	156.931	Report	
1995	February 19	4	Sterling Marlin	Morgan–McClure Motorsports	Chevrolet	200	500 (804.672)	3:31:42	141.71	Report	
1996	February 18	88	Dale Jarrett	Robert Yates Racing	Ford	200	500 (804.672)	3:14:25	154.308	Report	
1997	February 16	24	Jeff Gordon	Hendrick Motorsports	Chevrolet	200	500 (804.672)	3:22:18	148.295	Report	
1998	February 15	3	Dale Earnhardt	Richard Childress Racing	Chevrolet	200	500 (804.672)	2:53:42	172.712	Report	
1999	February 14	24	Jeff Gordon	Hendrick Motorsports	Chevrolet	200	500 (804.672)	3:05:42	161.551	Report	
2000	February 20	88	Dale Jarrett	Robert Yates Racing	Ford	200	500 (804.672)	3:12:43	155.669	Report	
2001	February 18	15	Michael Waltrip	Dale Earnhardt, Inc.	Chevrolet	200	500 (804.672)	3:05:26	161.783	Report	
2002	February 17	22	Ward Burton	Bill Davis Racing	Dodge	200	500 (804.672)	3:29:50	130.81	Report	
2003	February 16	15	Michael Waltrip	Dale Earnhardt, Inc.	Chevrolet	109*	272.5 (438.546)	2:02:08	133.87	Report	
2004	February 15	8	Dale Earnhardt Jr.	Dale Earnhardt, Inc.	Chevrolet	200	500 (804.672)	3:11:53	156.341	Report	
2005	February 20	24	Jeff Gordon	Hendrick Motorsports	Chevrolet	203*	507.5 (816.742)	3:45:16	135.173	Report	
2006	February 19	48	Jimmie Johnson	Hendrick Motorsports	Chevrolet	203*	507.5 (816.742)	3:33:26	142.667	Report	
2007	February 18	29	Kevin Harvick	Richard Childress Racing	Chevrolet	202*	505 (812.719)	3:22:55	149.333	Report	
2008	February 17	12	Ryan Newman	Penske Racing	Dodge	200	500 (804.672)	3:16:30	152.672	Report	
2009	February 15	17	Matt Kenseth	Roush Fenway Racing	Ford	152*	380 (611.551)	2:51:40	132.816	Report	
2010	February 14	1	Jamie McMurray	Earnhardt Ganassi Racing	Chevrolet	208*	520 (836.859)	3:47:16	137.284	Report	
2011	February 20	21	Trevor Bayne	Wood Brothers Racing	Ford	208*	520 (836.859)	3:59:24	130.326	Report	
2012	February 27–28*	17	Matt Kenseth	Roush Fenway Racing	Ford	202*	505 (812.719)	3:36:02	140.256	Report	
2013	February 24	48	Jimmie Johnson	Hendrick Motorsports	Chevrolet	200	500 (804.672)	3:08:23	159.25	Report	
2014	February 23	88	Dale Earnhardt Jr.	Hendrick Motorsports	Chevrolet	200	500 (804.672)	3:26:29	145.29	Report	
2015	February 22	22	Joey Logano	Team Penske	Ford	203*	507.5 (816.742)	3:08:02	161.939	Report	
2016	February 21	11	Denny Hamlin	Joe Gibbs Racing	Toyota	200	500 (804.672)	3:10:25	157.549	Report	
2017	February 26	41	Kurt Busch	Stewart–Haas Racing	Ford	200	500 (804.672)	3:29:31	143.187	Report	
2018	February 18	3	Austin Dillon	Richard Childress Racing	Chevrolet	207*	517.5 (832.835)	3:26:15	150.545	Report	
2019	February 17	11	Denny Hamlin	Joe Gibbs Racing	Toyota	207*	517.5 (832.835)	3:44:55	137.44	Report	
2020	February 16–17*	11	Denny Hamlin	Joe Gibbs Racing	Toyota	209*	522.5 (840.882)	3:42:10	141.11	Report	
2021	February 14–15*	34	Michael McDowell	Front Row Motorsports	Ford	200	500 (804.672)	3:27:44	144.416	Report	
2022	February 20	2	Austin Cindric	Team Penske	Ford	201*	502.5 (808.695)	3:31:53	142.295	Report	
2023	February 19	47	Ricky Stenhouse Jr.	JTG Daugherty Racing	Chevrolet	212*	530 (853.174)	3:38:53	145.283	Report	
2024	February 19	24	William Byron	Hendrick Motorsports	Chevrolet	200	500 (804.672)	3:10:52	157.178†	Report	
2025	February 16	24	William Byron	Hendrick Motorsports	Chevrolet	201*	502.5 (808.695)	3:53:26	129.159	Report	
2026	February 15	45	Tyler Reddick	23XI Racing	Toyota	200	500 (804.672)	3:23:56	147.107	Report	
2027	February 21									Report	

‡ – Record for fastest Daytona 500 before the stages era at 177.602 mph (285.823 km/h) set by Buddy Baker in 1980.

† - Record for fastest Daytona 500 during the stages era at 157.178 mph (252.953 km/h) set by William Byron in 2024.

=== Notes ===
- 1965–66, 2003, 2009: Races shortened due to rain.
- 1974: Race shortened due to energy crisis.
- 2005–07, 2010–12, 2015, 2018–20, 2022–23 and 2025: Races extended due to NASCAR overtime.
- 2012: Race was postponed from Sunday afternoon to Monday night due to rain and finished after midnight on Tuesday.
- 2020: Race began on Sunday but finished on Monday evening due to rain.
- 2021: Race ran on Sunday, but finished after midnight on Monday.
- 2024: Race was postponed from Sunday afternoon to Monday afternoon at 4 PM Eastern Standard Time due to rain.

=== Multiple winners (drivers) ===
# wins	Driver	Years won
7	Richard Petty	1964, 1966, 1971, 1973, 1974, 1979, 1981
4	Cale Yarborough	1968, 1977, 1983, 1984
3	Bobby Allison	1978, 1982, 1988
3	Dale Jarrett	1993, 1996, 2000
3	Jeff Gordon	1997, 1999, 2005
3	Denny Hamlin	2016, 2019, 2020
2	Bill Elliott	1985, 1987
2	Sterling Marlin	1994, 1995
2	Michael Waltrip	2001, 2003
2	Matt Kenseth	2009, 2012
2	Jimmie Johnson	2006, 2013
2	Dale Earnhardt Jr.	2004, 2014
2	William Byron	2024, 2025

=== Multiple winners (teams) ===
# wins	Team	Years won
10	Hendrick Motorsports	1986, 1989, 1997, 1999, 2005, 2006, 2013, 2014, 2024, 2025
9	Petty Enterprises	1959, 1964, 1966, 1970, 1971, 1973, 1974, 1979, 1981
5	Wood Brothers Racing	1963, 1968, 1972, 1976, 2011
4	Joe Gibbs Racing	1993, 2016, 2019, 2020
3	Ranier-Lundy	1980, 1983, 1984
3	Morgan–McClure Motorsports	1991, 1994, 1995
3	Robert Yates Racing	1992, 1996, 2000
3	Richard Childress Racing	1998, 2007, 2018
3	Dale Earnhardt, Inc.	2001, 2003, 2004
3	Team Penske	2008, 2015, 2022
2	Holman Moody	1965, 1967
2	Junior Johnson & Associates	1969, 1977
2	Melling Racing	1985, 1987
2	RFK Racing	2009, 2012

=== Manufacturer wins ===
# wins	Manufacturer	Years won
27	Chevrolet	1960, 1975, 1977, 1984, 1986, 1989-1991, 1993–1995, 1997–1999, 2001, 2003–2007, 2010, 2013, 2014, 2018, 2023–2025
17	Ford	1963, 1965, 1967, 1969, 1978, 1985, 1987, 1992, 1996, 2000, 2009, 2011, 2012, 2015, 2017, 2021, 2022
4	Plymouth	1964, 1966, 1970, 1971
4	Dodge	1973, 1974, 2002, 2008
4	Toyota	2016, 2019, 2020, 2026
3	Mercury	1968, 1972, 1976
3	Oldsmobile	1959, 1979, 1980
3	Pontiac	1961, 1962, 1983
3	Buick	1981, 1982, 1988

== See also ==
- NASCAR O'Reilly Auto Parts Series at Daytona International Speedway
- NASCAR Craftsman Truck Series at Daytona International Speedway

Previous race: America 250 Florida Duel at Daytona	NASCAR Cup Series; Daytona 500	Next race: Autotrader 400
