= Reb Wickersham =

- Born: Charles A. Wickersham; January 11, 1934; Longboat Key, Florida, U.S.
- Died: June 20, 2024 (aged 90)

NASCAR Cup Series career
- 41 races run over 6 years
- Best finish: 33rd (1963)
- First race: 1960 Daytona 500 (Daytona)
- Last race: 1965 National 400 (Charlotte)
Wins	Top tens	Poles
0	4	0

Charles A. Wickersham (January 11, 1934 – June 20, 2024), better known as Reb Wickersham, was an American professional stock car racing driver. He was a driver in the NASCAR Grand National Series from 1960 to 1965. Wickersham died on June 20, 2024, at the age of 90.
