= Brownie King =

American racing driver

- Born: Herman H. King; January 31, 1934 (age 92); Johnson City, Tennessee, U.S.

NASCAR Cup Series career
- 97 races run over 6 years
- Best finish: 9th (1957)
- First race: 1956 Arclite 100 (Columbia)
- Last race: 1961 Southeastern 500 (Bristol)
Wins	Top tens	Poles
0	27	0

NASCAR Convertible Division career
- 24 races run over 3 years
- Best finish: 5th (1959)
- First race: 1957 Race 30 (Martinsville)
- Last race: 1959 Race 15 (Charlotte)
Wins	Top tens	Poles
0	7	0

Bob "Brownie" King (January 31, 1934) is an American retired NASCAR Grand National Series driver. He drove in both the 1959 Daytona 500 and the 1960 Daytona 500. Prior to the creation of the Daytona 500, he drove multiple times in the NASCAR sanctioned Grand National race at the Daytona Beach and Road Course.

In the 1957 NASCAR Grand National Series, King finished ninth in the standings.

In 1959, its final year, King finished fifth in the standings in the NASCAR Convertible Division.

In 1962, King won the track championship at Bristol Motor Speedway.

In 2024, NASCAR Craftsman Truck Series driver Christian Eckes competed in a tribute paint scheme honoring King at Darlington Raceway.
