= Shep Langdon =

- Born: January 25, 1934
- Died: January 6, 2014 (aged 79)

NASCAR Cup Series career
- 45 races run over 4 years
- Best finish: 12th (1959)
- First race: 1957 untitled race (Raleigh)
- Last race: 1960 Daytona 500 (Daytona)
Wins	Top tens	Poles
0	8	0

NASCAR Convertible Division career
- 53 races run over 3 years
- Best finish: 7th (1958)
- First race: 1957 untitled race (Daytona)
- Last race: 1959 untitled race (Charlotte)
Wins	Top tens	Poles
0	11	0

Shep Langdon (January 25, 1934 – January 6, 2014) was an American professional stock car racing driver. He was a driver in the NASCAR Grand National Series from 1957 to 1960.
