= John Masoni =

Former NASCAR car owner

John Masoni is a former NASCAR Grand National Series car owner whose career lasted from 1960 to 1961.

== Summary ==
Masoni's employees included Junior Johnson, Marvin Panch, Jim Paschal, and David Pearson. Out of forty races, Masoni took his drivers to six victories, 19 finishes in the top "five," and 25 finishes in the "top ten." They also managed to lead 3265 laps out of 6866 and finish an average of 14th place. Masoni's first win was at the 1960 Daytona 500 (with a vehicle built by Ray Fox in just one week) while his last victory was at the 1961 Dixie 400. He would finally relinquish his NASCAR team owner responsibilities after David Pearson finished in 21st place at the 1961 National 400; after starting the race with the emphatic pole position.

Masoni's employees also started an average of eight place and competed for a grand total of 6,811.1 miles (10,961.4 km); earning a grand total of $83385 for Mr. Masoni ($898,385.16 when adjusted for inflation).

The best average finishes for Masoni would be through retired NASCAR driver Marvin Panch; whose average finish of sixth place would boost his reputation as a businessman and a NASCAR team owner. However, Jim Paschal was the biggest liability for Masoni due to his average finish of 26th place while under Masoni's employment. Vehicles under Masoni's employment would generally finish approximately six positions worse than they started.
