= 1961 Dixie 400 =

Auto race held at Atlanta Motor Speedway in 1961

Race details
- Race 46 of 52 in the 1961 NASCAR Grand National Series season
- Layout of Atlanta International Speedway, used until 1996
- Date: September 17, 1961
- Official name: Dixie 400
- Location: Atlanta International Raceway, Hampton, Georgia
- Course: Permanent racing facility
- Course length: 1.500 miles (2.400 km)
- Distance: 267 laps, 401 mi (705 km)
- Weather: Temperatures reaching 69.1 °F (20.6 °C); wind speeds of 15.9 miles per hour (25.6 km/h)
- Average speed: 125.384 miles per hour (201.786 km/h)
- Attendance: 30,000

Pole position
| Driver | Fireball Roberts | Smokey Yunick Racing |

Most laps led
| Driver | Banjo Matthews | Matthews Racing |
- Laps: 167

Winner
| No. 3 | David Pearson | John Masoni |

Television in the United States
- Network: untelevised
- Announcers: none

The 1961 Dixie 400 was a NASCAR Grand National Series event that was held on September 17, 1961, at Atlanta International Raceway in Hampton, Georgia.

A filming of a full-length feature Hollywood film entitled Thundering Wheels was a part of the festivities planned for this race in addition to a 210-minute performance by some of the legendary performers from the Grand Ole Opry. Local beauty pageant personality Linda Vaughn was chosen to be the queen of the 1961 running of the Dixie 400.

== Background ==
Atlanta International Raceway (now Atlanta Motor Speedway) is one of ten current intermediate tracks to hold NASCAR races. The layout at Atlanta International Speedway at the time was a four-turn traditional oval track that is 1.54 miles (2.48 km) long. The track's turns are banked at twenty-four degrees, while the front stretch, the location of the finish line, and the back stretch are banked at five.

== Race report ==
Fireball Roberts would qualify at a speed of 136.924 miles per hour (220.358 km/h) to clinch the pole position. The average speed of the race was 125.384 miles per hour (201.786 km/h). While Fireball Roberts, Nelson Stacy and Banjo Matthews would dominate the earliest parts of this event, the closing moments were a contest between Junior Johnson and David Pearson. These drivers had the monopoly on the first-place position throughout the race; tying with the 1960 Atlanta 500 with the fewest lead changes.

The 267-lap race lasted three hours and eleven minutes. There were 42 drivers on the grid out of the 46 who originally qualified for this event. Tommy Irwin would suffer from a bad piston in his vehicle that prevented him from starting the race; he was credited as the last-place finisher. Lee Reitzel would be the lowest-finishing driver to complete the entire event while Banjo Matthew's faulty engine prevented him from finishing in the top ten. Lap deficits were noticed between the top cars once Banjo dropped out; forcing the flagman to throw the white flag multiple times. Thirty thousand people would see David Pearson defeat Junior Johnson by five seconds. Fred Lorenzen's engine blew, spewing oil on the track. Lorenzen's car spun into a concrete retaining wall and Fireball Roberts narrowly missed him. Dave Mader spun into a guardrail, knocking him unconscious.

This would be the last start for Jesse James Taylor, the same one that finished 2nd in the 1951 Southern 500, and then was critically injured at Lakewood that year.

The transition to purpose-built racecars began in the early 1960s and occurred gradually over that decade. Changes made to the sport by the late 1960s brought an end to the "strictly stock" vehicles of the 1950s.

Individual earnings for each driver ranged from the winner's share of $9,330 ($100,521 when adjusted for inflation) to the last-place finisher's share of $200 ($2,155 when adjusted for inflation). The total prize purse for this event was $39,960 ($430,527 when adjusted for inflation). Six notable crew chiefs would take part in this race, including Ray Fox, Bud Allman and Shorty Johns.

=== Qualifying ===
| Grid | No. | Driver | Manufacturer | Speed | Owner |
|---|---|---|---|---|---|
| 1 | 22 | Fireball Roberts | '61 Pontiac | 136.294 | Smokey Yunick |
| 2 | 29 | Nelson Stacy | '61 Ford | 135.042 | Dudley Farrell |
| 3 | 8 | Joe Weatherly | '61 Pontiac | 135.000 | Bud Moore |
| 4 | 28 | Fred Lorenzen | '61 Ford | 134.487 | Holman-Moody |
| 5 | 3 | David Pearson | '61 Pontiac | 136.778 | John Masoni |
| 6 | 24 | Darel Dieringer | '60 Pontiac | 135.287 | James Turner |
| 7 | 94 | Banjo Matthews | '61 Ford | 134.220 | Banjo Matthews |
| 8 | 72 | Bobby Johns | '61 Ford | 134.220 | Shorty Johns |
| 9 | 27 | Junior Johnson | '61 Pontiac | 133.887 | Rex Lovette |
| 10 | 4 | Rex White | '61 Chevrolet | 133.581 | Rex White |

Failed to qualify: Tony Lavati (#66)

== Finishing order ==
Section reference:

1. David Pearson (No. 3)
2. Junior Johnson (No. 27)
3. Fireball Roberts (No. 22)
4. Jack Smith (No. 47)
5. Richard Petty (No. 43)
6. Johnny Allen (No. 14)
7. Ned Jarrett (No. 11)
8. Bob Welborn (No. 46)
9. Woodie Wilson (No. 51)
10. Marvin Panch (No. 6)
11. Banjo Matthews* (No. 94)
12. Bobby Johns (No. 72)
13. Jim Paschal (No. 44)
14. Emanuel Zervakis (No. 85)
15. Tiny Lund (No. 30)
16. Joe Weatherly (No. 8)
17. Ken Rush (No. 59)
18. Rex White (No. 4)
19. Nelson Stacy* (No. 29)
20. Darel Dieringer* (No. 24)
21. L.D. Austin (No. 74)
22. Herman Beam (No. 19)
23. Ed Livingston (No. 68)
24. Lee Reitzel (No. 93)
25. Buck Baker* (No. 87)
26. Bill Morgan* (No. 32)
27. J.C. Hendrix* (No. 78)
28. Elmo Langley* (No. 96)
29. Bunkie Blackburn* (No. 9)
30. T.C. Hunt* (No. 10)
31. G. C. Spencer* (No. 48)
32. Bob Barron* (No. 71)
33. Doug Yates* (No. 23)
34. George Alsobrook* (No. 99)
35. Ralph Earnhardt* (No. 5)
36. Fred Lorenzen* (No. 28)
37. Dave Mader* (No. 90)
38. Tubby Gonzales* (No. 80)
39. Herb Tillman* (No. 86)
40. Jesse James Taylor* (No. 15)
41. Curtis Crider* (No. 62)
42. Tommy Irwin* (No. 2)

* Driver failed to finish race

== Timeline ==
Section reference:

- Start of race: Fireball Roberts officially started the race with the pole position; Tommy Irwin had to leave the race due to a problem with one of his pistons.
- Lap 3: A bearing came loose off of Curtis Crider's vehicle.
- Lap 10: Engine problems managed to bring Jesse James Taylor's race to a screeching halt.
- Lap 28: Fred Lorenzen took over the lead from Fireball Roberts.
- Lap 36: Nelson Stacy took over the lead from Fred Lorenzen.
- Lap 46: Oil pressure issues ended Herb Tillman's day on the track.
- Lap 47: Engine problems managed to relegate Tubby Gonzales to the sidelines.
- Lap 51: Dave Mader had a terminal crash.
- Lap 52: Fred Lorenzen had a terminal crash.
- Lap 53: Joe Weatherly took over the lead from Nelson Stacy.
- Lap 57: Banjo Matthews took over the lead from Joe Weatherly.
- Lap 62: Ralph Earnhardt's vehicle developed problems with its transmission.
- Lap 63: A problematic piston managed to take George Alsobrook out of the race.
- Lap 65: Oil pressure issues effectively eliminate Doug Yates out of the event.
- Lap 200: Bobby Johns took over the lead from Banjo Matthews.
- Lap 203: A troublesome piston forced Bill Morgan to leave the race due to safety reasons.
- Lap 209: Buck Baker could not cope with a problematic engine, forcing him to finish in a miserable 25th place.
- Lap 211: Nelson Stacy took over the lead from Bobby Johns.
- Lap 238: Darel Dieringer had a terminal crash; forcing him to exit the event prematurely.
- Lap 243: Nelson Stacy managed to blow his engine while racing at high speeds.
- Lap 244: Banjo Matthews took over the lead from Nelson Stacy.
- Lap 262: Banjo Matthews managed to blow his engine while racing at high speeds.
- Lap 264: Fireball Roberts took over the lead from Banjo Matthews.
- Lap 266: David Pearson took over the lead from Fireball Roberts.
- Finish: David Pearson officially became the winner of the event.

| Preceded by 1961 untitled race at California State Fairgrounds | NASCAR Grand National races 1961 | Succeeded by 1961 Old Dominion 500 |

| Preceded by none | Dixie 400 races 1961 | Succeeded by 1962 |
