= 1961 Southern 500 =

Race details
- Race 42 of 52 in the 1961 NASCAR Sprint Cup Series
- The 1961 Southern 400 program cover, celebrating the 50th anniversary of naval aviation.
- Date: September 4, 1961
- Location: Darlington Raceway
- Course: Permanent racing facility
- Course length: 1.375 miles (2.213 km)
- Distance: 364 laps, 500.5 mi (805.477 km)
- Average speed: 117.787 mph (189.560 km/h)

Pole position
- Driver: Fireball Roberts

Most laps led
- Driver: Fireball Roberts
- Laps: 180

Winner
- No. 29: Nelson Stacy

The 1961 Southern 500 was a race that took place at Darlington Raceway on September 4, 1961, in the NASCAR Grand National Series. It was the forty-second race of the 1961 NASCAR Grand National Series.

Nelson Stacy won after 364 laps, after taking the lead from Fireball Roberts late in the race. It was the first of Stacy's four Grand National victories in his career.

== Qualifying ==
Pos.	#	Driver	Make	Team/Owner	Time	Avg. Speed (mph)
1	22	Fireball Roberts	'61 Pontiac	Smokey Yunick		128.680
2	28	Fred Lorenzen	'61 Ford	Holman-Moody		128.437
3	29	Nelson Stacy	'61 Ford	Dudley Farrell		127.020
4	8	Joe Weatherly	'61 Pontiac	Bud Moore Engineering		126.890
5	43	Richard Petty	'61 Plymouth	Petty Enterprises		125.906
6	6	Ralph Earnhardt	'61 Pontiac	Owens Racing		125.906
7	44	Jim Paschal	'61 Pontiac	Petty Enterprises		125.866
8	42	Marvin Panch	'61 Plymouth	Petty Enterprises		125.158
9	3	David Pearson	'61 Pontiac	John Masoni		127.783
10	94	Banjo Matthews	'61 Ford	Banjo Matthews		127.012
11	87	Buck Baker	'61 Chrysler	Buck Baker		126.339
12	72	Bobby Johns	'61 Ford	Shorty Johns		125.938
13	9	Bunkie Blackburn	'61 Ford	Wildcat Williams		125.842
14	27	Junior Johnson	'61 Pontiac	Rex Lovette		125.364
15	4	Rex White	'61 Pontiac	Jack Smith		124.489
16	86	Buddy Baker	'61 Chrysler	Buddy Baker		124.410
17	66	Bill Morgan	'61 Ford	Ratus Walters		126.372
18	46	Larry Frank	'61 Pontiac	Jack Smith		125.994
19	24	unknown*	Pontiac			125.245
20	52	Cale Yarborough	'61 Ford	Julian Buesink		125.023
21	85	Emanuel Zervakis	'61 Chevrolet	Monroe Shook		124.489
22	2	Tommy Irwin	'61 Chevrolet	Tom Daniels		124.387
23	32	Joe Caspolich	'61 Ford	J. L. Cheatham		124.169
24	19	Herman Beam	'60 Ford	Herman Beam		120.247
25	59	Tiny Lund	'61 Pontiac	B. G. Holloway		126.711
26	90	Dave Mader	'61 Chevrolet	Dave Mader		125.578
27	14	Johnny Allen	'61 Chevrolet	Joe Lee Johnson		124.208
28	80	Darel Dieringer	'61 Ford	Tubby Gonzales		124.114
29	82	Marvin Porter	'61 Ford	Harry Dunbar		124.029
30	1	Paul Lewis	'61 Chevrolet	Jess Porter		123.990
31	5	Woodie Wilson	'61 Pontiac	Leroy Faucett		123.172
32	7	Jim Reed	'61 Chevrolet	Jim Reed		123.004
33	30	Elmo Langley	'60 Chevrolet	Fred Clark		122.517
34	11	Ned Jarrett	'61 Chevrolet	B. G. Holloway		122.388
35	10	T.C. Hunt	'61 Dodge	Fred Wheat		121.988
36	54	Jimmy Pardue	'60 Chevrolet	Jimmy Pardue		121.487
37	47	Bob Burdick**	Pontiac	Jack Smith		121.264
38	96	Friday Hassler	'60 Chevrolet	J. L. Cheatham		120.812
39	68	Ed Livingston	'61 Ford	Curtis Crider		120.072
40	62	Curtis Crider	'61 Mercury	Curtis Crider		119.854
41	74	L.D. Austin	'61 Chevrolet	L.D. Austin		118.060
42	75	Red Hollingsworth	'60 Chevrolet	J. D. Braswell		114.902
43	93	George Green*	Ford			114.576
44	99	George Alsobrook	'61 Ford	Joe Jones		114.167

*Did not compete for unknown reasons.

**Driver changed to Rex White for the race.

== Results ==
Fin	St	#	Driver	Make	Team/Owner	Sponsor	Laps	Led	Status	Pts	Winnings
1	3	29	Nelson Stacy	'61 Ford	Dudley Farrell	Ron's Ford Sales, Holt-Stacy	364	72	running		$18,430
2	1	22	Fireball Roberts	'61 Pontiac	Smokey Yunick		364	180	running		$10,670
3	9	3	David Pearson	'61 Pontiac	John Masoni	Daytona Kennel	363	6	running		$5,060
4	7	44	Jim Paschal	'61 Pontiac	Petty Enterprises		359	0	running		$2,625
5	20	85	Emanuel Zervakis	'61 Chevrolet	Monroe Shook		359	0	running		$2,450
6	33	11	Ned Jarrett	'61 Chevrolet	B. G. Holloway		354	0	running		$1,500
7	26	14	Johnny Allen	'61 Chevrolet	Joe Lee Johnson		348	0	running		$1,195
8	18	24	Roscoe Thompson	'60 Pontiac	James Turner		347	0	running		$1,195
9	6	6	Ralph Earnhardt	'61 Pontiac	Owens Racing		346	0	engine		$875
10	36	47	Rex White	'61 Pontiac	Jack Smith		345	0	running		$925
11	12	72	Bobby Johns	'61 Ford	Shorty Johns		344	0	running		$750
12	16	66	Bill Morgan	'61 Ford	Ratus Walters	Cafe Burgundy	342	0	running		$700
13	32	30	Elmo Langley	'60 Chevrolet	Fred Clark		341	0	running		$500
14	14	27	Junior Johnson	'61 Pontiac	Rex Lovette	Holly Farms	337	0	running		$450
15	24	59	Tiny Lund	'61 Pontiac	B. G. Holloway		323	0	crash		$650
16	40	74	L.D. Austin	'61 Chevrolet	L.D. Austin		321	0	running		$350
17	35	54	Jimmy Pardue	'60 Chevrolet	Jimmy Pardue		316	0	running		$300
18	39	62	Curtis Crider	'61 Mercury	Curtis Crider	Mims Amusement Co.	312	0	running		$750
19	23	19	Herman Beam	'60 Ford	Herman Beam		312	0	running		$250
20	17	46	Larry Frank	'61 Pontiac	Jack Smith		273	0	spindle		$480
21	25	90	Dave Mader	'61 Chevrolet	Dave Mader		262	0	timing		$280
22	4	8	Joe Weatherly	'61 Pontiac	Bud Moore Engineering		229	13	rf hub		$370
23	31	7	Jim Reed	'61 Chevrolet	Jim Reed		228	0	brakes		$200
24	15	86	Buddy Baker	'61 Chrysler	Buddy Baker		221	0	bearings		$700
25	34	10	T.C. Hunt	'61 Dodge	Fred Wheat		206	0	rear end		$700
26	5	43	Richard Petty	'61 Plymouth	Petty Enterprises		201	41	engine		$1,110
27	11	87	Buck Baker	'61 Chrysler	Buck Baker		190	0	con rod		$220
28	21	2	Tommy Irwin	'61 Chevrolet	Tom Daniels		164	0	rocker arm		$200
29	2	28	Fred Lorenzen	'61 Ford	Holman-Moody		158	52	throttle		$950
30	19	52	Cale Yarborough	'61 Ford	Julian Buesink		135	0	engine		$200
31	8	42	Marvin Panch	'61 Plymouth	Petty Enterprises		94	0	carburetor		$200
32	28	82	Marvin Porter	'61 Ford	Harry Dunbar		85	0	crash		$200
33	29	1	Paul Lewis	'61 Chevrolet	Jess Porter		81	0	crash		$200
34	30	5	Woodie Wilson	'61 Pontiac	Leroy Faucett		79	0	crash		$200
35	38	68	Ed Livingston	'61 Ford	Curtis Crider		79	0	head gasket		$200
36	10	94	Banjo Matthews	'61 Ford	Banjo Matthews		65	0	engine		$430
37	22	32	Joe Caspolich	'61 Ford	J. L. Cheatham		50	0	rear end		$200
38	27	80	Darel Dieringer	'61 Ford	Tubby Gonzales		45	0	rear end		$300
39	13	9	Bunkie Blackburn	'61 Ford	Wildcat Williams		34	0	head gasket		$200
40	37	96	Friday Hassler	'60 Chevrolet	J. L. Cheatham		22	0	brakes		$200
41	43	99	George Alsobrook	'61 Ford	Joe Jones		2	0	handling		$200
42	41	75	Red Hollingsworth	'60 Chevrolet	J. D. Braswell		2	0	handling		$200
43	42	93	Lee Reitzel	'60 Ford	Lee Reitzel		2	0	handling		$200

== Crashes ==
Among the 43 competitors in the 1961 Southern 500, Marvin Potter, Paul Lewis and Woodie Wilson were involved in a crash, resulting in them coming 32nd, 33rd and 34th respectively. Tiny Lund crashed toward the end of the race, finishing in 15th position.

== Thurmond speech ==
Prior to the commencement of the race, South Carolina Senator Strom Thurmond was present to give a political speech in which he claimed that South Carolina would secede from the United States because of its opposition to civil rights legislation. The American Spectator reported that spectators responded to the speech with enthusiasm, and the infield at Darlington was "so violent and liquor-soaked that the area was fenced off and not even the police would enter for anything less than a shooting".
