= 1961 Buddy Shuman 250 =

Auto race held at Hickory Speedway in 1961

Race details
- Race 43 of 52 in the 1961 NASCAR Grand National Series season
- Date: September 9, 1961
- Official name: Buddy Shuman 250
- Location: Hickory Speedway, Hickory, North Carolina
- Course: Permanent racing facility
- Course length: 0.644 km (0.400 miles)
- Distance: 250 laps, 100 mi (150 km)
- Weather: Very hot with temperatures of 87.1 °F (30.6 °C); wind speeds of 11.1 miles per hour (17.9 km/h)
- Average speed: 67.529 mph (108.677 km/h)
- Attendance: 10,500

Pole position
Driver	Rex White	Rex White

Most laps led
Driver	Ned Jarrett	B.G. Holloway
- Laps: 160

Winner
No. 4	Rex White	Rex White

Television in the United States
- Network: untelevised
- Announcers: none

The 1961 Buddy Shuman 250 was a NASCAR Grand National Series event that was held on September 8, 1961, at Hickory Speedway in Hickory, North Carolina.

== Background ==
Hickory Motor Speedway is a short track located in Hickory, North Carolina. It is one of stock car racing's most storied venues, and is often referred to as the "World's Most Famous Short Track" and the "Birthplace of the NASCAR Stars".

The track first opened in 1951 as a 1/2-mile (0.80 km) dirt track. Gwyn Staley won the first race at the speedway and later became the first track champion. Drivers such as Junior Johnson, Ned Jarrett, and Ralph Earnhardt also became track champions in the 1950s, with Earnhardt winning five of them.

In 1953, NASCAR's Grand National Series (later the Cup Series) visited the track for the first time. Tim Flock won the first race at the speedway, which became a regular part of the Grand National schedule. After winning his track championship in 1952, Junior Johnson became the most successful Grand National driver at Hickory, winning there seven times.

The track has been re-configured three times in its history. The track became a 0.4-mile (644 meters) dirt track in 1955, which was paved for the first time during the 1967 season.

== Race report ==
Two hundred and fifty-two laps were accomplished on a dirt track spanning 0.400 miles (0.644 km). The race took one hour and twenty-eight minutes to complete (the approximate length of three modern 30-minute sitcoms aired simultaneously). The pole position speed achieved by eventual winner Rex White was 72.290 miles per hour (116.339 km/h). Jack Smith would become the eventual second-place finished after being outlapped by White in front of 10500 live spectators. Two cautions slowed the race for an undetermined length of laps. Junior Johnson would crash on lap 58 in his 1961 Pontiac Catalina machine while the winning vehicle would be classified as a Chevrolet with a 1961 model year (presumably a Bel Air). Being a modest race on a short dirt track, the highest prize that was awarded at the time was $900 ($9,470 in current U.S. dollars).

A young Richard Petty (being only 24 years old during this race) would finish in 17th place due to issues with his vehicle's rear end on lap 102.; it would be a rare occasion where he drove a car other than his signature number 43. The entire 20-car field was made up of American-born males. Bud Allman was Ned Jarrett's crew chief for the race; he helped Jarrett finish in eighth place.

The transition to purpose-built racecars began in the early 1960s and occurred gradually over that decade. Changes made to the sport by the late 1960s brought an end to the "strictly stock" vehicles of the 1950s.

=== Qualifying ===
Grid	No.	Driver	Manufacturer	Owner
1	4	Rex White	'61 Chevrolet	Rex White
2	27	Junior Johnson	'61 Pontiac	Rex Lovette
3	7	Joe Weatherly	'60 Pontiac	Elmo Henderson
4	54	Jimmy Pardue	'60 Chevrolet	Jimmy Pardue
5	86	Buck Baker	'61 Chrysler	Buck Baker
6	42	Richard Petty	'61 Plymouth	Petty Enterprises
7	11	Ned Jarrett	'61 Chevrolet	B.G. Holloway
8	6	Cotton Owens	'60 Pontiac	Cotton Owens
9	17	Fred Harb	'61 Ford	Fred Harb
10	23	Doug Yates	'59 Plymouth	Raeford Johnson
11	85	Emanuel Zervakis	'60 Chevrolet	Monroe Shook
12	48	G.C. Spencer	'60 Chevrolet	G.C. Spencer
13	47	Jack Smith	'61 Pontiac	Jack Smith
14	19	Herman Beam	'60 Ford	Herman Beam
15	93	Lee Reitzel	'60 Ford	Lee Reitzel
16	3	Mark Hurley	'59 T-Bird	unknown
17	36	Larry Thomas	'60 Chevrolet	Wade Yonts
18	74	L.D. Austin	'61 Chevrolet	L.D. Austin
19	5	Paul Lewis	'59 Chevrolet	unknown
20	71	Bob Barron	'60 Dodge	Bob Barron

== Top 10 finishers ==
Pos	Grid	No.	Driver	Manufacturer	Laps	Winnings	Laps led	Time/Status
1	1	4	Rex White	Chevrolet	250	$900	32	1:28:51
2	13	47	Jack Smith	Pontiac	249	$525	0	+1 lap
3	5	86	Buck Baker	Chrysler	249	$375	0	+1 lap
4	8	6	Cotton Owens	Pontiac	248	$275	0	+2 laps
5	11	85	Emanuel Zervakis	Chevrolet	246	$250	0	+4 laps
6	12	48	G.C. Spencer	Chevrolet	242	$215	0	+8 laps
7	9	17	Fred Harb	Ford	240	$175	0	+10 laps
8	7	11	Ned Jarrett	Chevrolet	239	$150	160	Left rear axle problems
9	18	74	L.D. Austin	Chevrolet	233	$140	0	+17 laps
10	15	93	Lee Reitzel	Ford	225	$130	0	+25 laps

== Timeline ==
Section reference:

- Start of race: Rex White started the race with the pole position, who was prompted overtaken by Junior Johnson prior to lap 2.
- Lap 58: Junior Johnson had a terminal crash, forcing him to withdraw from the event.
- Lap 59: Rex White took the lead from Junior Johnson.
- Lap 61: The clutch in Doug Yates' vehicle became problematic, ending his day on the track.
- Lap 89: The rear end of Larry Thomas' vehicle was disabled, ending the race early for him.
- Lap 102: Richard Petty's vehicle would be missing a rear end, prompting him to leave the race early.
- Lap 162: The rear end of Bob Barron's vehicle fell out, forcing him to leave the race prematurely.
- Lap 189: Joe Weatherly noticed that the ball joints on his vehicle came out, forcing him to end his race session early.
- Lap 190: Rex White took over the lead from Ned Jarrett.
- Lap 194: The left-rear axle that belonged to Jimmy Pardue's vehicle stopped working properly on this lap.
- Lap 209: Ned Jarrett took over the lead from Rex White.
- Lap 239: The left-rear axle of Ned Jarrett's vehicle developed major issues, forcing him to accept a respectable eighth-place finish.
- Lap 240: Rex White took over the lead from Ned Jarrett for the final 11 laps of the event.
- Finish: Rex White was officially declared the winner of the event.

Preceded by 1961 Southern 500	NASCAR Grand National Series Season; 1961	Succeeded by 1961 Capital City 200
