= 1962 Dixie 400 =

Auto race held at Atlanta Motor Speedway in 1962

Race details
- Race 53 of 53 in the 1962 NASCAR Grand National Series season
- Layout of Atlanta International Speedway, used until 1996
- Date: October 28, 1962
- Official name: Dixie 400
- Location: Atlanta International Raceway, Hampton, Georgia
- Course: Permanent racing facility
- Course length: 1.500 miles (2.400 km)
- Distance: 267 laps, 401 mi (645 km)
- Weather: Temperatures of 68 °F (20 °C); wind speeds of 7 miles per hour (11 km/h)
- Average speed: 124.74 miles per hour (200.75 km/h)
- Attendance: 25,000

Pole position
Driver	Fireball Roberts	Jim Stephens
- Time: 78.850 seconds

Most laps led
Driver	Fireball Roberts	Jim Stephens
- Laps: 144

Winner
No. 4	Rex White	Rex White

Television in the United States
- Network: untelevised
- Announcers: none

The 1962 Dixie 400 was a NASCAR Grand National Series event that was held on October 28, 1962, at Atlanta International Raceway in Hampton, Georgia.

The transition to purpose-built racecars began in the early 1960s and occurred gradually over that decade. Changes made to the sport by the late 1960s brought an end to the "strictly stock" vehicles of the 1950s.

This race was not originally scheduled to be the 53rd race of the 1962 NASCAR Grand National Series season. It was initially scheduled for October 21 at South Boston, Virginia but it was finally canceled due to lack of entries. Joe Weatherly would clinch the championship title as a result of the cancelled race in South Boston.

== Background ==
Atlanta International Raceway (now Atlanta Motor Speedway) is one of ten current intermediate track to hold NASCAR races. The layout at Atlanta International Speedway at the time was a four-turn traditional oval track that is 1.54 miles (2.48 km) long. The track's turns are banked at twenty-four degrees, while the front stretch, the location of the finish line, and the back stretch are banked at five.

== Race report ==
The major sponsors in this race were Holman-Moody, Rex White, and Fred Lovette. H. B. Bailey, making his debut in this race, flipped over after hitting the infield berm. Also in this race, Tommy Irwin's car hit the guardrail and rode along the guardrail on its side. Jimmy Thompson and Woodie Wilson would retire from NASCAR after this race. 23 drivers would fail to finish the race. Notable crew chiefs participating in the event included Ray Fox, Bud Moore, Herman Beam, Banjo Matthews and Lee Petty.

Three cautions would slow this 267-lap race. The total distance of this race was approximately 401 miles or 645 kilometres. Fireball Roberts would qualify for the pole position at the speed of 124.74 miles per hour (200.75 km/h). George Green would be the last-place finisher due to an engine problem in his Chevrolet on the third lap. Other notable drivers in this race were Marvin Panch, Richard Petty, Fred Lorenzen, Buck Baker, and Elmo Langley.

At the end of three hours and twelve minutes of racing, Rex White defeated Joe Weatherly by 12 seconds in his 1962 Chevrolet; becoming the final win in White's NASCAR Cup Series career. David Pearson made a one-off start for owner Bud Moore. They wouldn't team up again until 1972, though each found plenty of success separately. In order to win the 1962 Dixie 400, White had to receive assistance from Marvin Panch's vehicle in order to conserve fuel. Individual take-home earnings for each driver ranged from the winner's share of $10,315 ($109,788 when adjusted for inflation) to the last-place finisher's share of $250 ($2,661 when adjusted for inflation). The total prize purse was $42,510 ($452,458 when adjusted for inflation).

=== Qualifying ===
Grid	No.	Driver	Manufacturer	Qualifying time	Speed	Owner
1	22	Fireball Roberts	'62 Pontiac	78.850	138.978	Jim Stephens
2	28	Fred Lorenzen	'62 Ford	79.000	138.710	Holman-Moody
3	21	Marvin Panch	'62 Ford	79.150	138.452	Wood Brothers
4	3	Junior Johnson	'62 Pontiac	79.230	138.310	Ray Fox
5	4	Rex White	'62 Chevrolet	79.390	138.019	Rex White
6	72	Bobby Johns	'62 Pontiac	79.400	138.019	Shorty Johns
7	8	Joe Weatherly	'62 Pontiac	79.440	137.939	Bud Moore
8	46	Johnny Allen	'62 Pontiac	79.530	137.781	Fred Lovette
9	29	Nelson Stacy	'62 Ford	79.710	137.474	Holman-Moody
10	08	David Pearson	'62 Pontiac	79.860	137.221	Bud Moore

Failed to qualify: George Alsobrook (#63), Cotton Wallace (#9), Lee Reitzel (#93), Bruce Brantley (#96)

== Finishing order ==
Section reference:

1. Rex White (No. 4)
2. Joe Weatherly (No. 8)
3. Marvin Panch (No. 21)
4. Richard Petty (No. 43)
5. Fred Lorenzen (No. 28)
6. Larry Frank (No. 77)
7. Stick Elliott (No. 18)
8. Buck Baker (No. 47)
9. Jack Smith (No. 17)
10. Fireball Roberts (No. 22)
11. David Pearson (No. 08)
12. Bob Welborn (No. 49)
13. Elmo Langley (No. 66)
14. Ralph Earnhardt (No. 91)
15. Buddy Baker (No. 87)
16. G.C. Spencer (No. 48)
17. Jim Paschal (No. 42)
18. Bunkie Blackburn (No. 83)
19. Tiny Lund (No. 12)
20. Johnny Allen (No. 46)
21. Herman Beam (No. 19)
22. Jimmy Thompson (No. 90)
23. Darel Dieringer (No. 26)
24. Bobby Johns (No. 72)
25. Jimmy Pardue (No. 54)
26. Sherman Utsman (No. 61)
27. Emanuel Zervakis (No. 20)
28. Tommy Irwin (No. 40)
29. Larry Thomas (No. 36)
30. H. B. Bailey (No. 24)
31. H. G. Rosier (No. 5)
32. Johnny Sudderth (No. 30)
33. Cale Yarborough (No. 92)
34. Doug Yates (No. 27)
35. Nelson Stacy (No. 29)
36. Junior Johnson (No. 3)
37. LeeRoy Yarbrough (No. 81)
38. Red Foote (No. 84)
39. Paul Lewis (No. 97)
40. Ned Jarrett (No. 11)
41. Woodie Wilson (No. 38)
42. Tom Cox (No. 86)
43. Curtis Crider (No. 62)
44. George Green (No. 1)

== Timeline ==
Section reference:

- Start of race: Fireball Roberts had the pole position as the green flag was waved.
- Lap 3: George Green managed to wreck his vehicle's engine.
- Lap 4: Junior Johnson took over the lead from Fireball Roberts.
- Lap 6: Fireball Roberts took over the lead from Junior Johnson.
- Lap 11: Oil pressure issues wiped out Tom Cox's chance of winning the race.
- Lap 12: Ned Jarrett managed to wreck his vehicle's engine.
- Lap 20: Paul Lewis managed to wreck his vehicle's engine.
- Lap 35: Junior Johnson took over the lead from Fireball Roberts.
- Lap 47: Bobby Johns took over the lead from Junior Johnson.
- Lap 53: Junior Johnson took over the lead from Bobby Johns.
- Lap 55: Red Foote managed to wreck his vehicle's engine.
- Lap 62: LeeRoy Yarbrough had a terminal crash.
- Lap 66: Bobby Johns took over the lead from Junior Johnson; Junior Johnson had a terminal crash.
- Lap 68: Richard Petty took over the lead from Bobby Johns.
- Lap 71: Marvin Panch took over the lead from Richard Petty; Nelson Stacy had a terminal crash.
- Lap 75: Doug Yates managed to wreck his vehicle's engine.
- Lap 84: Cale Yarbrough managed to wreck his vehicle's engine.
- Lap 96: Fireball Roberts took over the lead from Marvin Panch.
- Lap 101: H. B. Bailey had a terminal crash.
- Lap 103: Bobby Johns took over the lead from Fireball Roberts.
- Lap 124: Tommy Irwin had a terminal crash.
- Lap 133: Marvin Panch took over the lead from Bobby Johns.
- Lap 135: Fireball Roberts took over the lead from Marvin Panch.
- Lap 145: Emanuel Zervakis managed to damage his vehicle's transmission beyond repair.
- Lap 148: Sherman Utsman managed to wreck his vehicle's engine.
- Lap 158: The head gasket managed to come loose off Jimmy Pardue's vehicle.
- Lap 188: Bobby Johns had a terminal crash.
- Lap 193: Marvin Panch took over the lead from Fireball Roberts.
- Lap 194: Fireball Roberts took over the lead from Marvin Panch.
- Lap 196: Darel Dieringer managed to wreck his vehicle's engine.
- Lap 229: Oil pressure issues managed to eradicate Jimmy Thompson's chances of winning the race.
- Lap 241: Marvin Panch took over the lead from Fireball Roberts.
- Lap 265: Rex White took over the lead from Marvin Panch.
- Finish: Rex White was officially declared the winner of the event.

Preceded by 1962 National 400	NASCAR Grand National Series Season; 1962-63	Succeeded by 1963 untitled race at Fairgrounds Raceway

Preceded by 1961	Dixie 400 races 1962	Succeeded by 1963
