= Sherman Utsman =

American racing driver (1932–2019)

- Born: Sherman Aaron Utsman Sr. April 15, 1932; Piney Flats, Tennessee, U.S.
- Died: June 10, 2019 (aged 87); Elizabethton, Tennessee, U.S.

NASCAR Cup Series career
- 21 races run over 4 years
- Best finish: 32nd (1962)
- First race: 1956 Virginia 500 (Martinsville)
- Last race: 1963 Turkey Day 200 (Tar Heel)
| Wins | Top tens | Poles |
|---|---|---|
| 0 | 9 | 0 |

Sherman Aaron Utsman Sr. (April 15, 1932 – June 10, 2019) was an American NASCAR Grand National driver.

== Biography ==
Between the ages of 24 and 31, Utsman competed in 3,558.9 miles (5,727.5 km) and 5304 laps of racing. Most of Utsman's rides were with the 1962 Ford Galaxie bearing the #6 number. Utsman was related to fellow drivers Dub Utsman, John Utsman, Larry Utsman, and Layman Utsman, who have all retired from driving in NASCAR competitions. Utsman's only top-five finish came at the 1962 Confederate 200, which took place on August 3, 1962 at the Boyd Speedway in Chattanooga, Tennessee. Utsman was also a NASCAR owner/driver with him having legal ownership of a stock car in three different races. Utsman drove the race car twice and Joe Weatherly drove one of his vehicles at an untitled race at Speedway Park in Jacksonville, Florida on December 1, 1963.

== Motorsports career results ==
=== NASCAR ===
(key) (Bold – Pole position awarded by qualifying time. Italics – Pole position earned by points standings or practice time. * – Most laps led. ** – All laps led.)

==== Grand National Series ====
NASCAR Grand National Series results
| Year | Team Owner | No. | Make | 1 | 2 | 3 | 4 | 5 | 6 | 7 | 8 | 9 | 10 | 11 | 12 | 13 | 14 | 15 | 16 | 17 | 18 | 19 | 20 | 21 | 22 | 23 | 24 | 25 | 26 | 27 | 28 | 29 | 30 | 31 | 32 | 33 | 34 | 35 | 36 | 37 | 38 | 39 | 40 | 41 | 42 | 43 | 44 | 45 | 46 | 47 | 48 | 49 | 50 | 51 | 52 | 53 | 54 | 55 | 56 | NGNC | Pts | Ref |
|---|---|---|---|---|---|---|---|---|---|---|---|---|---|---|---|---|---|---|---|---|---|---|---|---|---|---|---|---|---|---|---|---|---|---|---|---|---|---|---|---|---|---|---|---|---|---|---|---|---|---|---|---|---|---|---|---|---|---|---|---|---|---|
| 1956 | N/A | 418 | Chevy | HCY | CLT | WSS | PBS | ASF | DAB | PBS | WIL | ATL | NWS | LAN | RCH | CLB | CON | GPS | HCY | HBO | MAR; 7 | LIN | CLT | POR | EUR | NYF | MER | MAS; 28 | CLT | MCF | POR | AWS; 24 | RSP; 32 | PIF | CSF | CHI | CCF | MGY | OKL | ROA | OBS | SAN | NOR | PIF | MYB | POR | | | | | | | | | | | | | | 82nd | N/A | |
| 1956 | Robert McReynolds | 63 | Chevy | | | | | | | | | | | | | | | | | | | | | | | | | | | | | | | | | | | | | | | | | | | | DAR; 30 | CSH | CLT | LAN | POR | CLB | HBO | NWP | CLT | CCF | MAR | HCY | WIL | 82nd | N/A | |
| 1961 | Sherman Utsman | 26 | Ford | CLT | JSP | DAY | DAY | DAY | PIF | AWS | HMS | ATL | GPS | HBO | BGS | MAR | NWS | CLB | HCY | RCH | MAR | DAR | CLT | CLT | RSD | ASP | CLT | PIF | BIR | GPS | BGS | NOR | HAS | STR | DAY | ATL | CLB | MBS | BRI; 9 | NSV | BGS | AWS | RCH | SBO | DAR | HCY | RCH | CSF | ATL | MAR | NWS | CLT | BRI | GPS | HBO | | | | | 100th | 510 | |
| 1962 | Sherman Utsman | 61 | Ford | CON | AWS | DAY | DAY | DAY | CON | AWS | SVH | HBO | RCH | CLB | NWS | GPS | MBS | MAR | BGS | BRI | RCH | HCY | CON | DAR | PIF | CLT | ATL | BGS | AUG | RCH | SBO | DAY | CLB; 8 | ASH; 6 | GPS; 7 | AUG | SVH | MBS | BRI; 14 | CHT; 5 | NSV; 13 | HUN | AWS; 16 | STR | BGS | PIF | VAL | DAR; 15 | HCY | RCH | DTS | AUG | | NWS; 24 | CLT; 14 | ATL; 26 | | | | 32nd | 4,896 | |
| 1962 | Sherman Utsman | 61 | Chevy | | | | | | | | | | | | | | | | | | | | | | | | | | | | | | | | | | | | | | | | | | | | | | | | | | MAR; 14 | | | | | | | 32nd | 4,896 | |
| 1963 | Sherman Utsman | 61 | Ford | BIR; 9 | GGS; 8 | THS; 7 | RSD | DAY | DAY | DAY | PIF | AWS | HBO | ATL | HCY | BRI | AUG | RCH | GPS | SBO | BGS | MAR | NWS | CLB | THS | DAR | ODS | RCH | CLT | BIR | ATL | DAY | MBS | SVH | DTS | BGS | ASH | OBS | BRR | BRI | GPS | NSV | CLB | AWS | PIF | BGS | ONA | DAR | HCY | RCH | MAR | DTS | NWS | THS | CLT | SBO | HBO | RSD | | 78th | 864 | |
