= 1960 National 400 =

Auto race held at Charlotte Motor Speedway in 1960

Race details
- Race 42 of 44 in the 1960 NASCAR Grand National Series season
- Layout of Charlotte Motor Speedway
- Date: October 16, 1960
- Official name: National 400
- Location: Charlotte Motor Speedway, Concord, North Carolina
- Course: Permanent racing facility
- Course length: 1.500 miles (2.410 km)
- Distance: 267 laps, 400.5 mi (644.5 km)
- Weather: Very hot with temperatures of 82 °F (28 °C); wind speeds of 8.9 miles per hour (14.3 km/h)
- Average speed: 112.905 mph (181.703 km/h)

Pole position
Driver	Fireball Roberts	John Hines

Most laps led
Driver	Fireball Roberts	John Hines
- Laps: 197

Winner
No. 22	Speedy Thompson	Wood Brothers

The 1960 National 400 was a Grand National Series stock car race that was held on October 16, 1960, at Charlotte Motor Speedway in Concord, North Carolina.

The transition to purpose-built racecars began in the early 1960s and occurred gradually over that decade. Changes made to the sport by the late 1960s brought an end to the "strictly stock" vehicles of the 1950s.

== Background ==
Around 29,166 spectators traveled to Charlotte Motor Speedway to watch the race. Located in Concord, North Carolina, Charlotte Motor Speedway is a banked 1.5-mile (2.4 km) quad-oval that opened a few months earlier for the inaugural World 600.

== Race report ==
Bob Barron and Friday Hassler would make their NASCAR Grand National debut appearances here. Unfortunately, this would be Bob Barron's only start of the 1960 NASCAR Grand National Series season. Charlie Glotzbach would also make his NASCAR big league debut at this race but to a much smaller fanfare.

The race was held on a dry circuit; with no precipitation recorded around the speedway.

It took three hours and thirty-two minutes to complete 267 laps on a paved oval track spanning 1.500 miles (2.414 km). Seven cautions were waved by NASCAR officials for 34 laps. Speedy Thompson defeated Richard Petty by one lap and twelve seconds in front of nearly 30,000 spectators while going 112.905 miles per hour (181.703 km/h); helping the Wood Brothers' racing team earn their one of their first NASCAR wins as owners. Thompson would get his penultimate win of his NASCAR Cup career in this race; winning for the last time at the 1960 Capital City 400.

Fireball Roberts was the qualifier for the pole position with a speed of 133.465 miles per hour (214.791 km/h). Eight notable crew chiefs participated in the event; including Cotton Owens, Leonard Wood and Bud Moore. He would eventually blow a tire on lap 232; causing him to crash and lose the lead. There were fifty drivers who would ultimately participate in this event; all of them were American-born males.

Fred Lorenzen would earn the event's last-place finish for a vibration problem that he developed on lap 4; earning only $200 for that day ($1,852 when adjusted for inflation). Lowe's was one of the corporate sponsors of this racing event.

=== Qualifying ===
Grid	No.	Driver	Manufacturer	Owner
1	22	Fireball Roberts	'60 Pontiac	John Hines
2	47	Jack Smith	'60 Pontiac	Jack Smith
3	21	Speedy Thompson	'60 Ford	Wood Brothers
4	4	Rex White	'60 Chevrolet	Rex White
5	12	Joe Weatherly	'60 Ford	Holman-Moody Racing
6	5	Bobby Johns	'60 Pontiac	Cotton Owens
7	44	Jim Paschal	'60 Plymouth	Petty Enterprises
8	26	Curtis Turner	'60 Ford	Holman-Moody Racing
9	85	Emuanel Zervakis	'60 Chevrolet	Monroe Shook
10	87	Buck Baker	'60 Chevrolet	Buck Baker
11	11	Ned Jarrett	'60 Ford	Ned Jarrett
12	73	Johnny Beauchamp	'60 Chevrolet	Dale Swanson
13	7	Jim Reed	'60 Chevrolet	Jim Reed
14	27	Junior Johnson	'60 Pontiac	John Masoni
15	89	Joe Lee Johnson	'60 Chevrolet	Joe Lee Johnson
16	2	Possum Jones	'60 Chevrolet	Tom Daniels
17	94	Banjo Matthews	'60 Ford	Banjo Matthews
18	69	Johnny Allen	'60 Chevrolet	Hanley Dawson
19	42	Lee Petty	'60 Plymouth	Petty Enterprises
20	35	Don O'Dell	'60 Pontiac	J.D. Braswell
21	43	Richard Petty	'60 Plymouth	Petty Enterprises
22	78	Friday Hassler	'60 Chevrolet	E.C. Wilson
23	49	Bob Welborn	'60 Ford	Bob Welborn
24	81	Larry Frank	'60 Ford	Shorty Rollins
25	10	T.C. Hunt	'60 Plymouth	Fred Wheat

Failed to qualify: Buddy Baker (#20), Leroy Thomas, Wilbur Rakestraw (#99), Bob Duell (#95), Gerald Duke (#92), Speedy Thompson (#90), Charles Griffin (#78), Elmo Henderson (#70), Tiny Lund (#63), Jim Whitman (#60), Jim Cook (#38), Tommy Irwin (#36), Jimmy Massey (#21), LeeRoy Yarbrough

== Top 10 finishers ==
Pos	Grid	No.	Driver	Manufacturer	Laps	Winnings	Laps led	Time/Status
1	3	21	Speedy Thompson	Ford	267	$12,710	44	3:32:50
2	21	43	Richard Petty	Plymouth	266	$5,550	0	+1 lap
3	11	11	Ned Jarrett	Ford	266	$3,275	13	+1 lap
4	6	5	Bobby Johns	Pontiac	265	$2,880	0	+2 laps
5	14	27	Junior Johnson	Pontiac	265	$1,855	0	+2 laps
6	4	4	Rex White	Chevrolet	265	$2,050	0	+2 laps
7	9	85	Emanuel Zervakis	Chevrolet	263	$1,100	0	+4 laps
8	7	44	Jim Paschal	Pontiac	261	$920	0	+6 laps
9	30	59	Tom Pistone	Pontiac	260	$700	0	+7 laps
10	17	94	Banjo Matthews	Ford	259	$725	0	+8 laps

== Timeline ==
Section reference:

Fireball Roberts
Jack Smith
Fireball Roberts
Speedy Thompson
Fireball Roberts
Ned Jarrett
Larry Frank
Fireball Roberts
Speedy Thompson
│
1
│
11
│
21
│
31
│
41
│
51
│
61
│
71
│
81
│
91
│
101
│
111
│
121
│
131
│
141
│
151
│
161
│
171
│
181
│
191
│
201
│
211
│
221
│
231
│
241
│
251
│
261

Preceded by 1960 Wilkes 320	NASCAR Grand National Series Season; 1960	Succeeded by 1960 Capital City 200

Preceded by none	National 400 races 1960	Succeeded by 1961
