= 1960 Atlanta 500 =

Auto race held at Atlanta Motor Speedway in 1960

Race details
- Race 44 of 44 in the 1960 NASCAR Grand National Series season
- 1960 Atlanta 500 program cover
- Date: October 30, 1960
- Official name: Atlanta 500
- Location: Atlanta International Raceway, Hampton, Georgia
- Course: Permanent racing facility
- Course length: 1.500 miles (2.400 km)
- Distance: 334 laps, 501.0 mi (804 km)
- Weather: Temperatures of 69.1 °F (20.6 °C); wind speeds of 15 miles per hour (24 km/h)
- Average speed: 108.408 mph (174.466 km/h)
- Attendance: 30,000

Pole position
Driver	Fireball Roberts	John Hines
- Time: 160.030 seconds

Most laps led
Driver	Bobby Johns	Cotton Owens
- Laps: 194

Winner
No. 5	Bobby Johns	Cotton Owens

Television in the United States
- Network: untelevised
- Announcers: none

The 1960 Atlanta 500 was a NASCAR Grand National Series event that was held on October 30, 1960, at Atlanta International Raceway in Hampton, Georgia.

== Background ==
Atlanta International Raceway (now Atlanta Motor Speedway) is one of ten current intermediate tracks to hold NASCAR races. The layout at Atlanta International Speedway at the time was a four-turn traditional oval track that is 1.54 miles (2.48 km) long. The track's turns are banked at twenty-four degrees, while the front stretch, the location of the finish line, and the back stretch are banked at five.

== Race report ==
The transition to purpose-built racecars began in the early 1960s and occurred gradually over that decade. Changes made to the sport by the late 1960s brought an end to the "strictly stock" vehicles of the 1950s.

Thirty thousand spectators would attend this live spectacle where Bobby Johns (in his 1960 Pontiac Catalina) would defeat Johnny Allen (in his 1960 Chevrolet Bel Air) by a distance of one lap. The late-season combination of Speedy Thompson and the Wood Brothers racing organization paid off as they managed to win their first two races. Thompson tried to win his third race in a row, but came up short as he finished in fourth-place; with Bobby Johns out-lapping him four times over.

Johns would acquire his only victory on a superspeedway in this race. This would also serve as his only victory in the 1960 NASCAR Grand National Series season. In the 1960 NASCAR Grand National Series points standings, Rex White would beat Richard Petty by a whopping 3,936 points. It would completely shatter the record set by Lee Petty in 1959, but still wouldn't come close to the all-time record.

The race itself took four hours and thirty-six minutes to fully resolve 334 laps; with speeds averaging 108.408 miles per hour (174.466 km/h). Fireball Roberts would qualify for the pole position with a speed of 134.596 miles per hour (216.611 km/h). The other top ten finishers were: Jim Paschal, Speedy Thompson, Rex White (officially declared the Grand National Champion that year), Lee Petty, Richard Petty, Joe Weatherly, Bob Welborn and Fred Lorenzen.

Bill Gazaway would receive the last-place finish for his collision involving the rear end of his 1960 Oldsmobile vehicle on the first lap of the race; giving him the shortest NASCAR Grand National Series career alongside Paul Norris and Rich Vogler. LeeRoy Yarbrough would make his first NASCAR career start here; finishing in 33rd due to a crash on lap 60. Eight notable crew chiefs participated in the event; including Bud Moore, Ray Fox, Leonard Wood and Cotton Owens.

The record for the shortest NASCAR career would be broken in 1990 by Rich Vogler. He qualified for a 1990 race at Pocono, but he died the night before the race. He was given a 40th-place finish and a "Did Not Start", which means he completed zero laps. The fewest lead changes were committed here; this record would be officially tied with the 1961 Dixie 400 the following year.

=== Qualifying ===
Grid	No.	Driver	Manufacturer	Qualifying time	Speed	Owner
1	22	Fireball Roberts	'60 Pontiac	2:40.030	134.975	John Hines
2	47	Jack Smith	'60 Pontiac	2:41.180	134.012	Jack Smith
3	27	Junior Johnson	'60 Pontiac	2:41.810	133.490	John Masoni
4	28	Fred Lorenzen	'60 Ford	2:44.660	133.169	Fred Lorenzen
5	5	Bobby Johns	'60 Pontiac	2:44.660	131.179	Cotton Owens
6	12	Joe Weatherly	'60 Ford	2:44.130	131.603	Holman-Moody
7	94	Banjo Matthews	'60 Ford	2:44.070	131.651	Banjo Matthews
8	4	Rex White	'60 Chevrolet	2:45.790	130.285	Rex White
9	85	Emanuel Zervakis	'60 Chevrolet	2:45.960	130.152	Monroe Shook
10	90	Tiny Lund	'60 Ford	2:46.100	130.042	Junie Donlavey

== Timeline ==
Section reference:

- Start of race: Fireball Roberts officially held the pole position as the green flag was waved.
- Lap 1: Bill Gazaway would lose the rear end of his vehicle; Paul Norris fell out with engine failure.
- Lap 5: Ned Jarrett's engine stopped working properly.
- Lap 16: Friday Hassler's engine stopped working properly.
- Lap 23: Wilbur Rakestraw's engine stopped working properly.
- Lap 24: Elmo Langley's engine stopped working properly.
- Lap 39: Bob Eichor had a terminal crash.
- Lap 44: Jack Smith took over the lead from Fireball Roberts.
- Lap 46: Marvin Panch's brakes stopped working properly.
- Lap 51: Banjo Matthews had a terminal crash.
- Lap 52: Tiny Lund's engine stopped working properly.
- Lap 58: Jimmy Pardue's engine stopped working properly; Tiny Lund's engine would suffer a similar fate.
- Lap 60: LeeRoy Yarbrough had a terminal crash.
- Lap 63: Tommy Irwin took over the lead from Jack Smith.
- Lap 65: Joe Weatherly took over the lead from Tommy Irwin.
- Lap 73: The frame came right off of T.C. Hunt's vehicle.
- Lap 74: A problematic axle took Charlie Glotzbach out of the race.
- Lap 83: Johnny Beauchamp took over the lead from Joe Weatherly.
- Lap 85: Johnny Beauchamp had a terminal crash.
- Lap 86: Joe Weatherly took over the lead from Johnny Beauchamp.
- Lap 108: Roscoe Thompson took over the lead from Joe Weatherly.
- Lap 110: Bobby Johns took over the lead from Roscoe Thompson.
- Lap 132: The frame came right off of Charley Griffith's vehicle.
- Lap 144: Roscoe Thompson had a terminal crash.
- Lap 154: Jack Smith's engine stopped working properly.
- Lap 212: David Pearson had a terminal crash; a problematic axle took Junior Johnson out of the race.
- Lap 224: Tom Pistone's gas tank stopped working properly.
- Lap 255: Doug Yates' fuel pump stopped working properly.
- Finish: Bobby Johns was officially credited with the victory.
