= 1962 Southeastern 500 =

Auto race run at Bristol International Speedway in 1962

Race details
- Race 36 of 53 in the 1962 NASCAR Grand National Series season
- Layout of Bristol Motor Speedway
- Date: July 29, 1962
- Official name: Southeastern 500
- Location: Bristol International Speedway, Bristol, Tennessee
- Course: Permanent racing facility
- Course length: 0.500 miles (0.800 km)
- Distance: 500 laps, 250.0 mi (400.0 km)
- Weather: Warm with temperatures of 79 °F (26 °C); wind speeds of 8.9 mph (14.3 km/h)
- Average speed: 75.276 mph (121.145 km/h)
- Attendance: 15,000

Pole position
Driver	Fireball Roberts	Jim Stephens
- Time: 22.300 seconds

Most laps led
Driver	Junior Johnson	Owens Racing
- Laps: 166

Winner
No. 42	Jim Paschal	Petty Enterprises

Television in the United States
- Network: untelevised
- Announcers: none

The 1962 Southeastern 500 was a NASCAR Grand National Series event that was held on July 29, 1962, at Bristol International Speedway in Bristol, Tennessee.

The transition to purpose-built racecars began in the early 1960s and occurred gradually over that decade. Changes made to the sport by the late 1960s brought an end to the "strictly stock" vehicles of the 1950s.

== Race report ==
A lineup of 44 American-born drivers made the starting grid for this 500-lap event. Fireball Roberts earned the pole position with a lap of 80.321 mph (129.264 km/h) qualifying. Approximately 4% of this race was run under a caution flag. The model years ranged from 1960 to 1962; with most drivers using a Pontiac or a Chevrolet. Although official NASCAR records state that Joe Weatherly started in 13th place, he often preferred to call the position as "12A."

While Fireball Roberts and Junior Johnson dominated the first 100 laps, Fred Lorenzen and Jim Paschal would rule the final 100 laps of this race. Fifteen thousand fans would see an event that lasted three hours and nineteen minutes. Worth McMillion was the lowest-finishing driver to complete the event; he was 68 laps behind.

Paschal would go on to defeat Lorenzen by half a lap at an average speed of 75.276 mph (121.145 km/h) for the race; in a 1962 Plymouth Belvedere. Although he was not a member of the Petty family, his victory was a great asset for Petty Enterprises and would eventually pave the way for non-family members to belong in the organization. Allan Harley was given the credit for the last-place finish due to car handling issues on lap 5. Eleven drivers did not have their winnings recorded by NASCAR officials. Notable crew chiefs in this race included Bud Moore, Herman Beam, Glen Wood, Banjo Matthews and Lee Petty.

Individual earnings for each driver varied from $3,930 ($41,829 when adjusted for inflation) to $100 ($1,064 when adjusted for inflation). The total purse for this event was $17,925 ($190,786 when adjusted for inflation).

=== Qualifying ===
Grid	No.	Driver	Manufacturer	Speed	Qualifying time	Owner
1	22	Fireball Roberts	'62 Pontiac	80.717	22.300	Jim Stephens
2	6	Junior Johnson	'62 Pontiac	79.893	22.530	Cotton Owens
3	72	Bobby Johns	'62 Pontiac	79.751	22.570	Shorty Johns
4	28	Fred Lorenzen	'62 Ford	79.646	22.600	Holman-Moody
5	61	Sherman Utsman	'62 Ford	79.470	22.650	Sherman Utsman
6	54	Jimmy Pardue	'62 Pontiac	79.400	22.670	Jimmy Pardue
7	21	Marvin Panch	'62 Ford	79.330	22.690	Wood Brothers
8	29	Nelson Stacy	'62 Ford	79.295	22.700	Holman-Moody
9	47	Jack Smith	'62 Pontiac	79.225	22.720	Jack Smith
10	20	Emanuel Zervakis	'62 Mercury	79.190	22.730	Emanuel Zervakis

Failed to qualify: John Dodd Jr. (#38), Paul Lewis (#58), Darel Dieringer (#90), Al White (#31)

== Top 10 finishers ==
Pos	Grid	No.	Driver	Manufacturer	Laps	Winnings	Laps led	Time/Status
1	12	42	Jim Paschal	Plymouth	500	$3,930	77	3:19:16
2	4	28	Fred Lorenzen	Ford	500	$2,370	121	Lead lap under green flag
3	16	43	Richard Petty	Plymouth	500	$1,540	47	Lead lap under green flag
4	14	46	Johnny Allen	Pontiac	498	$1,270	60	+2 laps
5	8	29	Nelson Stacy	Ford	498	$875	0	+2 laps
6	13	8	Joe Weatherly	Pontiac	498	$900	0	+2 laps
7	11	4	Rex White	Chevrolet	494	$650	0	+6 laps
8	21	41	Bunkie Blackburn	Plymouth	491	$550	0	+9 laps
9	19	11	Ned Jarrett	Chevrolet	491	$675	0	+9 laps
10	6	54	Jimmy Pardue	Pontiac	491	$450	0	+9 laps

== Timeline ==
Section reference:

Fireball Roberts
Junior Johnson
Fred Lorenzen
Richard Petty
Fred Lorenzen
Johnny Allen
Richard Petty
Junior Johnson
Richard Petty
Fred Lorenzen
Jim Paschal
Fred Lorenzen
Jim Paschal
│
1
│
21
│
41
│
61
│
81
│
101
│
121
│
141
│
161
│
181
│
201
│
221
│
241
│
261
│
281
│
301
│
321
│
341
│
361
│
381
│
401
│
421
│
441
│
461
│
481

Preceded by 1962 untitled race at Rambi Raceway	NASCAR Grand National Season; 1962	Succeeded by 1962 Confederate 200
