= NASCAR's Most Popular Driver Award =

American car racing award

NASCAR's Most Popular Driver Award is awarded to the most popular NASCAR driver in the Cup Series, O'Reilly Auto Parts Series, and Craftsman Truck Series every year since 1956. It started as a poll of the drivers and then all NASCAR Cup Series competitors; today, it is voted for by fans across the United States.

The award is presented by the National Motorsports Press Association (NMPA). Sponsored by Hamburger Helper in 2010, it was also sponsored by Wheaties in 2011. The ceremony presenting the award is called the NASCAR Awards Banquet, and it is held in Nashville, Tennessee in November of each year.

The winner of the most awards is Bill Elliott with 16 in the NASCAR Cup Series. Justin Allgaier has the most with 6 awards in the O'Reilly Auto Parts Series, and Johnny Benson Jr. & Hailie Deegan have the most awards at three in the Craftsman Truck Series.

Dale Earnhardt Jr. has the second-most awards (15) and holds the longest streak, winning the award in 2003 and every year until his retirement in 2017.

In 2026, Kyle Busch was posthumously named Most Popular Driver following his sudden passing in May. His wife Samantha accepted it on his behalf. Prior to the awards banquet on November 10th, Chase Elliott notably withdrew his name from consideration in support of Busch, while he and other drivers encouraged fans to vote for him.

== Recipients ==
=== Cup Series ===
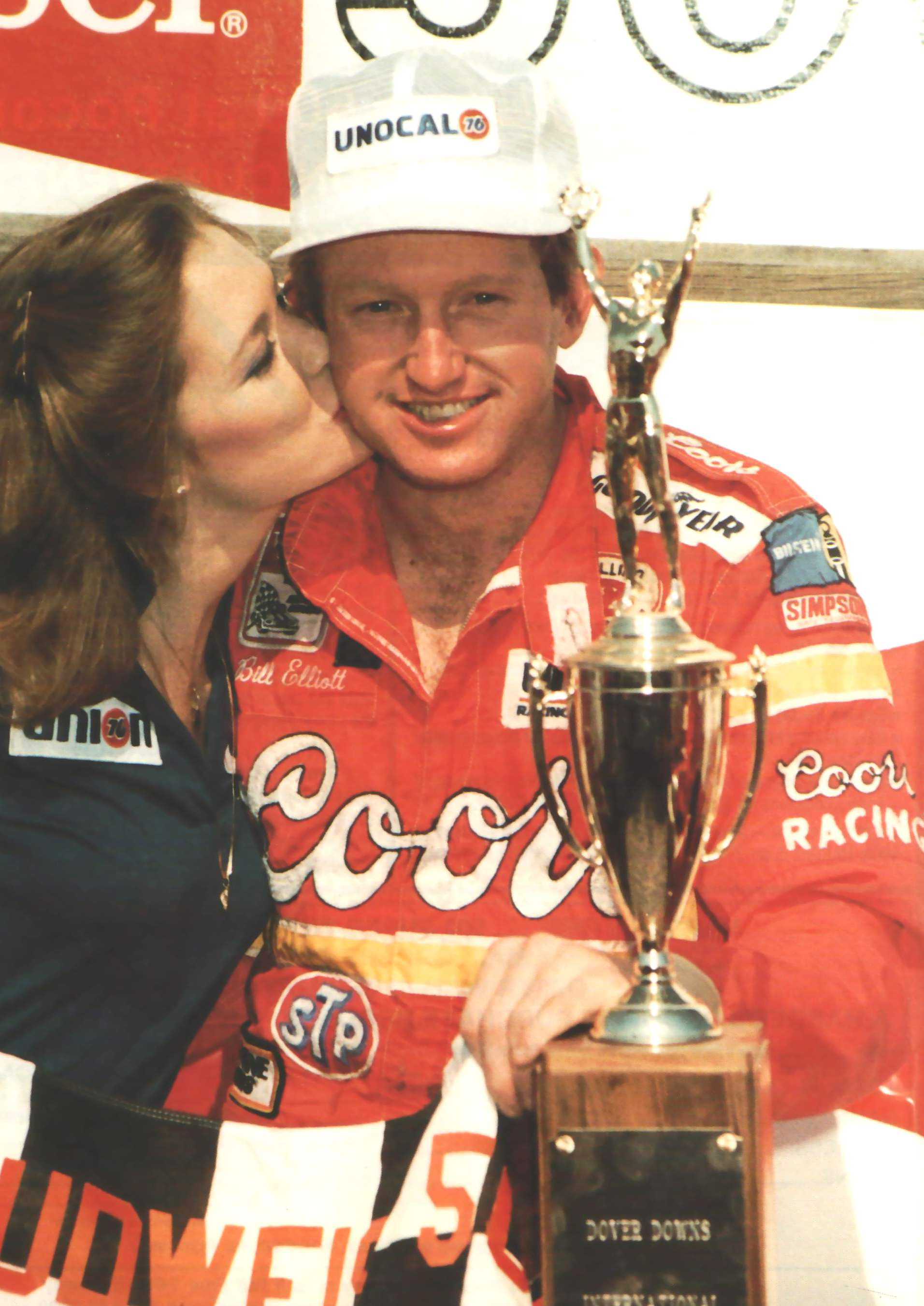
Bill Elliott has the most Most Popular Driver Awards in the Cup Series with 16.

Year	Driver	Team	Notes
1949	Curtis Turner	Hubert Westmoreland, Curtis Turner, Frank Christian	Voted on by a panel
1950	Not awarded		
1951	Not awarded		
1952	Lee Petty	Petty Enterprises	National award, covering every NASCAR series. Lee Petty won the series championship in 1954.
1953	Lee Petty	Petty Enterprises	National award, covering every NASCAR series. Lee Petty won the series championship in 1954.
1954	Lee Petty	Petty Enterprises, Gary Drake	National award, covering every NASCAR series. Lee Petty won the series championship in 1954.
1955	Tim Flock	Carl Kiekhaefer, Hubert Westmoreland	National award, covering every NASCAR series. Lee Petty won the series championship in 1954.
1956	Curtis Turner	Charlie Schwam	
1957	Fireball Roberts	Pete DePaolo, Fireball Roberts, Dick Beaty, Buck Baker	
1958	Glen Wood	Wood Brothers Racing	
1959	Jack Smith	Jack Smith	
1960	Rex White	Beau Morgan, Rex White, Scotty Cain, L. D. Austin	Won the series championship
1961	Joe Weatherly	Doc White, Bud Moore Engineering, Elmo Henderson	
1962	Richard Petty	Petty Enterprises	
1963	Fred Lorenzen	Holman-Moody, Wood Brothers Racing, Stewart McKinney	
1964	Richard Petty	Petty Enterprises	Won the series championship. Won that season's Daytona 500.
1965	Fred Lorenzen	Holman-Moody	Won that season's Daytona 500.
1966	Darel Dieringer	Toy Bolton, Bud Moore Engineering, Petty Enterprises, Reid Shaw, Betty Lilly, Junior Johnson & Associates	
1967	Cale Yarborough	Wood Brothers Racing, Neil Castles, Bud Moore Engineering	
1968	Richard Petty	Petty Enterprises	
1969	Bobby Isaac	Nord Krauskopf	
1970	Richard Petty	Petty Enterprises	
1971	Bobby Allison	Bobby Allison, Holman-Moody	
1972	Bobby Allison	Richard Howard	
1973	Bobby Allison	Bobby Allison	
1974	Richard Petty	Petty Enterprises	Won the series championship. Won that season's Daytona 500.
1975	Richard Petty	Petty Enterprises	Won the season championship.
1976	Richard Petty	Petty Enterprises	
1977	Richard Petty	Petty Enterprises	
1978	Richard Petty	Petty Enterprises	
1979	David Pearson	Wood Brothers Racing, Rod Osterlund	Part time driver
1980	Bobby Allison	Bud Moore Engineering	
1981	Bobby Allison	Ranier-Lundy	
1982	Bobby Allison	DiGard Motorsports	Won that season's Daytona 500.
1983	Bobby Allison	DiGard Motorsports	Won the series championship
1984	Bill Elliott	Melling Racing	
1985	Bill Elliott	Melling Racing	Won that season's Daytona 500
1986	Bill Elliott	Melling Racing	
1987	Bill Elliott	Melling Racing	Won that season's Daytona 500.
1988	Bill Elliott	Melling Racing	Won the series championship
1989	Darrell Waltrip	Hendrick Motorsports	Won that season's Daytona 500
1990	Darrell Waltrip	Hendrick Motorsports	Missed six races due to injuries.
1991	Bill Elliott	Melling Racing	
1992	Bill Elliott	Junior Johnson & Associates	
1993	Bill Elliott	Junior Johnson & Associates	
1994	Bill Elliott	Junior Johnson & Associates	
1995	Bill Elliott	Bill Elliott Racing	
1996	Bill Elliott	Bill Elliott Racing	Missed seven races due to injuries.
1997	Bill Elliott	Bill Elliott Racing	
1998	Bill Elliott	Bill Elliott Racing	Missed one race due to the death of his father.
1999	Bill Elliott	Bill Elliott Racing	
2000	Bill Elliott	Bill Elliott Racing	Missed two races due to injuries.
2001	Dale Earnhardt	Richard Childress Racing	Awarded posthumously. Perennial winner Bill Elliott withdrew his name from the 2001 ballot to encourage his supporters to posthumously vote for Earnhardt.
2002	Bill Elliott	Evernham Motorsports	Withdrew his own name from future ballots following this year
2003	Dale Earnhardt Jr.	Dale Earnhardt, Inc.	
2004	Dale Earnhardt Jr.	Dale Earnhardt, Inc.	Won that season's Daytona 500.
2005	Dale Earnhardt Jr.	Dale Earnhardt, Inc.	
2006	Dale Earnhardt Jr.	Dale Earnhardt, Inc.	
2007	Dale Earnhardt Jr.	Dale Earnhardt, Inc.	
2008	Dale Earnhardt Jr.	Hendrick Motorsports	
2009	Dale Earnhardt Jr.	Hendrick Motorsports	
2010	Dale Earnhardt Jr.	Hendrick Motorsports	
2011	Dale Earnhardt Jr.	Hendrick Motorsports	
2012	Dale Earnhardt Jr.	Hendrick Motorsports	Missed two races due to injury.
2013	Dale Earnhardt Jr.	Hendrick Motorsports	
2014	Dale Earnhardt Jr.	Hendrick Motorsports	Won that season's Daytona 500.
2015	Dale Earnhardt Jr.	Hendrick Motorsports	
2016	Dale Earnhardt Jr.	Hendrick Motorsports	Missed final 18 races due to injury.
2017	Dale Earnhardt Jr.	Hendrick Motorsports	
2018	Chase Elliott	Hendrick Motorsports	Won first three career races at Watkins Glen, Dover 2, and Kansas 2.
2019	Chase Elliott	Hendrick Motorsports	
2020	Chase Elliott	Hendrick Motorsports	Won the series championship
2021	Chase Elliott	Hendrick Motorsports	
2022	Chase Elliott	Hendrick Motorsports	Won the regular season championship
2023	Chase Elliott	Hendrick Motorsports	Missed seven races, six due to injury and one due to suspension for on-track conduct
2024	Chase Elliott	Hendrick Motorsports	
2025	Chase Elliott	Hendrick Motorsports	
2026	Kyle Busch	Richard Childress Racing	Awarded posthumously. Perennial winner Chase Elliott withdrew his name from the 2026 ballot to encourage his supporters to posthumously vote for Busch.

=== O'Reilly Auto Parts Series ===
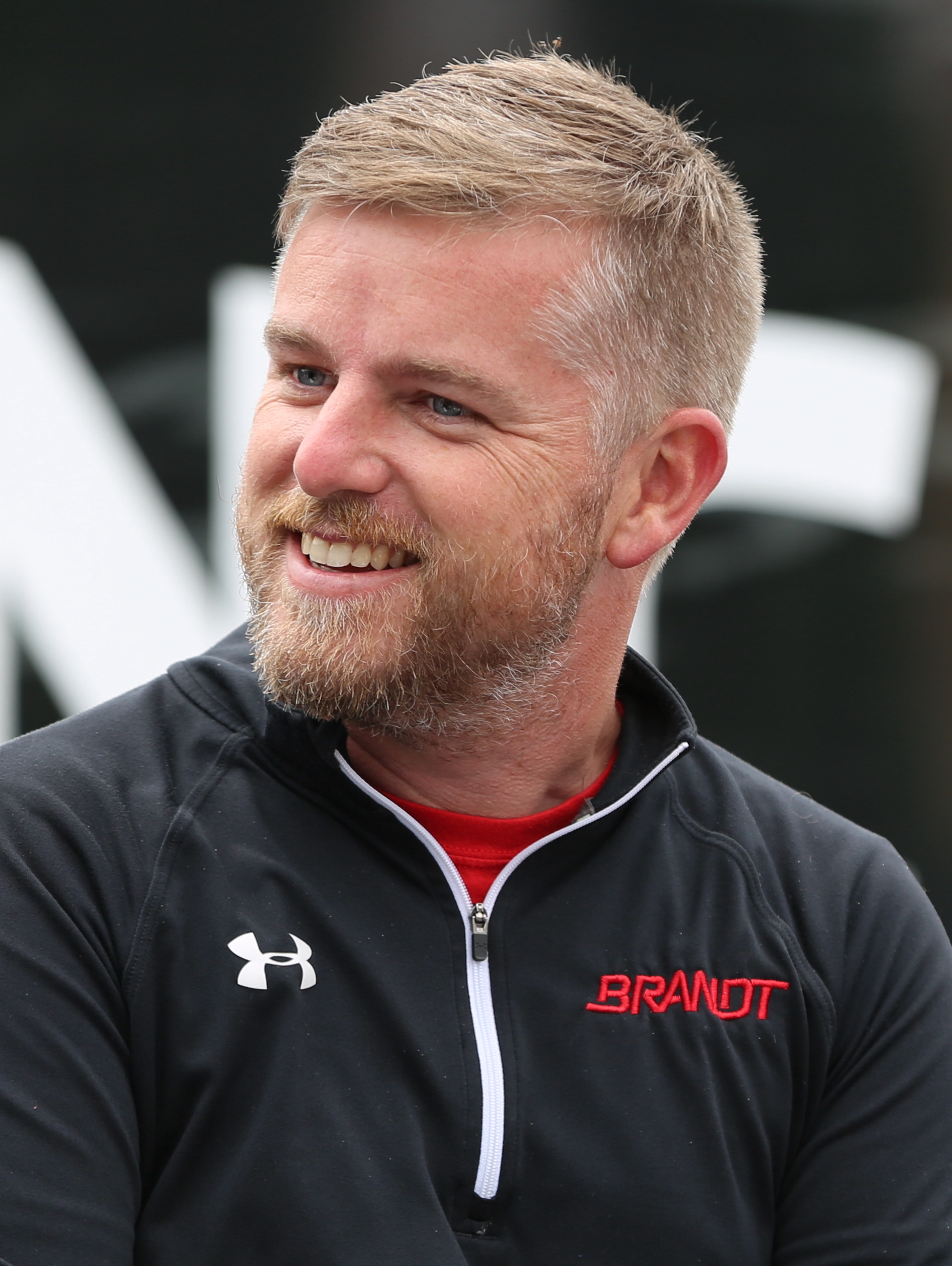
Justin Allgaier has the most Most Popular Driver Awards in the Xfinity Series with 6.

Year	Driver	Team	Notes
1982	Jack Ingram	Ingram Racing	Won the series championship
1983	Sam Ard	Thomas Brothers Racing	Won the series championship
1984	Sam Ard	Thomas Brothers Racing	Won the series championship
1985	Jimmy Hensley	Thomas Brothers Racing	
1986	Brett Bodine	Thomas Brothers Racing	
1987	Jimmy Hensley	Sam Ard Racing	
1988	Larry Pearson	Pearson Racing	
1989	Rob Moroso	Moroso Racing	Won the series championship
1990	Bobby Labonte	Labonte Motorsports	
1991	Kenny Wallace	Rusty Wallace Racing	
1992	Joe Nemechek	NEMCO Motorsports	Won the series championship
1993	Joe Nemechek	NEMCO Motorsports	
1994	Kenny Wallace	FILMAR Racing	
1995	Chad Little	Mark Rypien Motorsports	
1996	David Green	American Equipment Racing	
1997	Mike McLaughlin	Frank Cicci Racing	
1998	Buckshot Jones	Buckshot Racing	
1999	Dale Earnhardt Jr.	Dale Earnhardt, Inc.	Won the series championship
2000	Ron Hornaday Jr.	Dale Earnhardt, Inc.	
2001	Kevin Harvick	Richard Childress Racing	Won the series championship
2002	Greg Biffle	Roush Racing	Won the series championship
2003	Scott Riggs	ppc Racing	
2004	Martin Truex Jr.	Chance 2 Motorsports	Won the series championship
2005	Martin Truex Jr.	Chance 2 Motorsports	Won the series championship
2006	Kenny Wallace	ppc Racing	
2007	Carl Edwards	Roush Fenway Racing	Won the series championship
2008	Brad Keselowski	JR Motorsports	
2009	Brad Keselowski	JR Motorsports	
2010	Brad Keselowski	Penske Racing	Won the series championship
2011	Elliott Sadler	Kevin Harvick Incorporated	
2012	Danica Patrick	JR Motorsports	The first female driver to win the Xfinity Series MPD. The first female driver to win the MPD award overall.
2013	Regan Smith	JR Motorsports	
2014	Chase Elliott	JR Motorsports	Won the series championship
2015	Chase Elliott	JR Motorsports	
2016	Elliott Sadler	JR Motorsports	
2017	Elliott Sadler	JR Motorsports	
2018	Elliott Sadler	JR Motorsports	
2019	Justin Allgaier	JR Motorsports	
2020	Justin Allgaier	JR Motorsports	
2021	Justin Allgaier	JR Motorsports	
2022	Noah Gragson	JR Motorsports	
2023	Justin Allgaier	JR Motorsports	
2024	Justin Allgaier	JR Motorsports	Won the series championship
2025	Justin Allgaier	JR Motorsports	
2026	Justin Allgaier	JR Motorsports	Won the series championship

=== Craftsman Truck Series ===
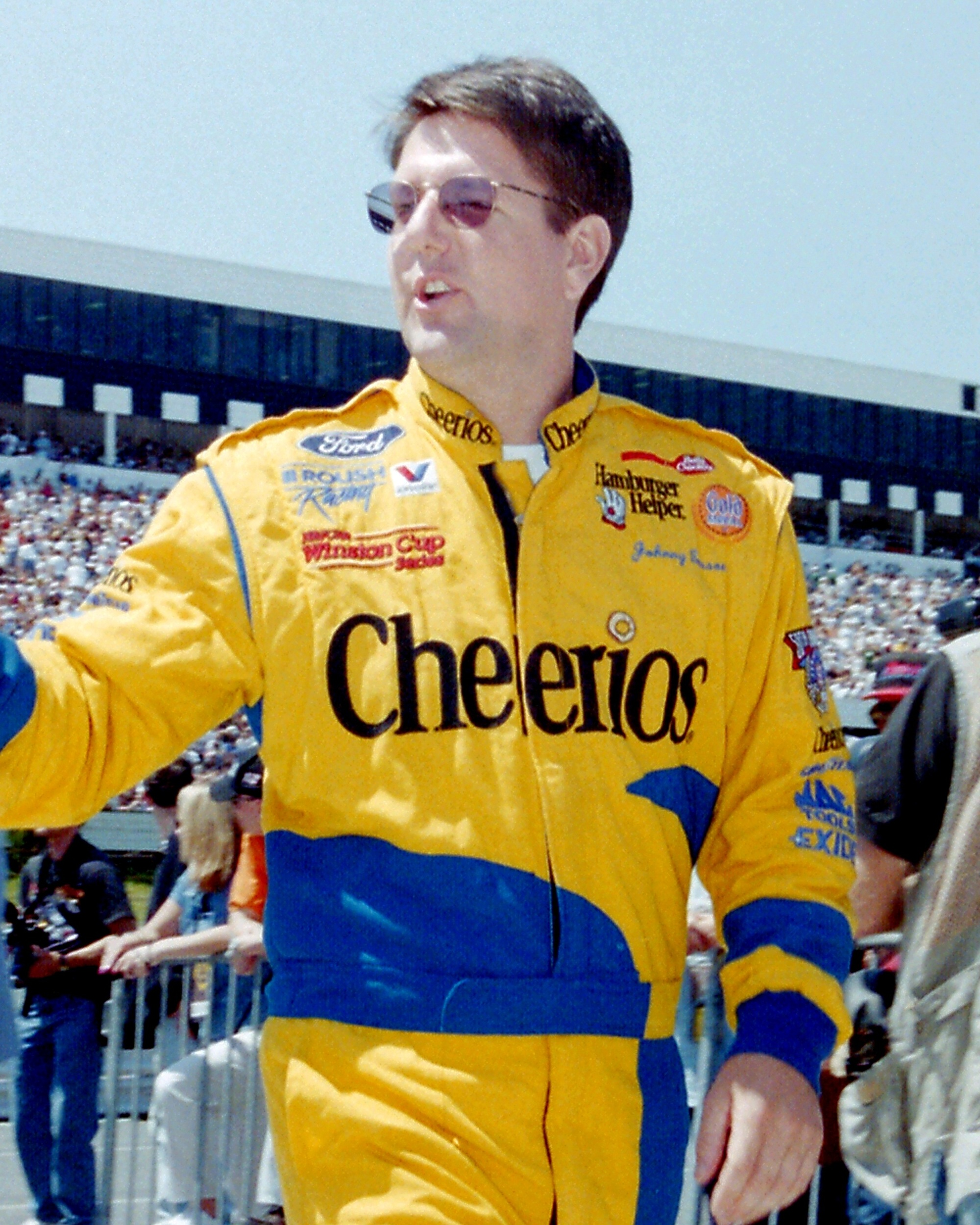
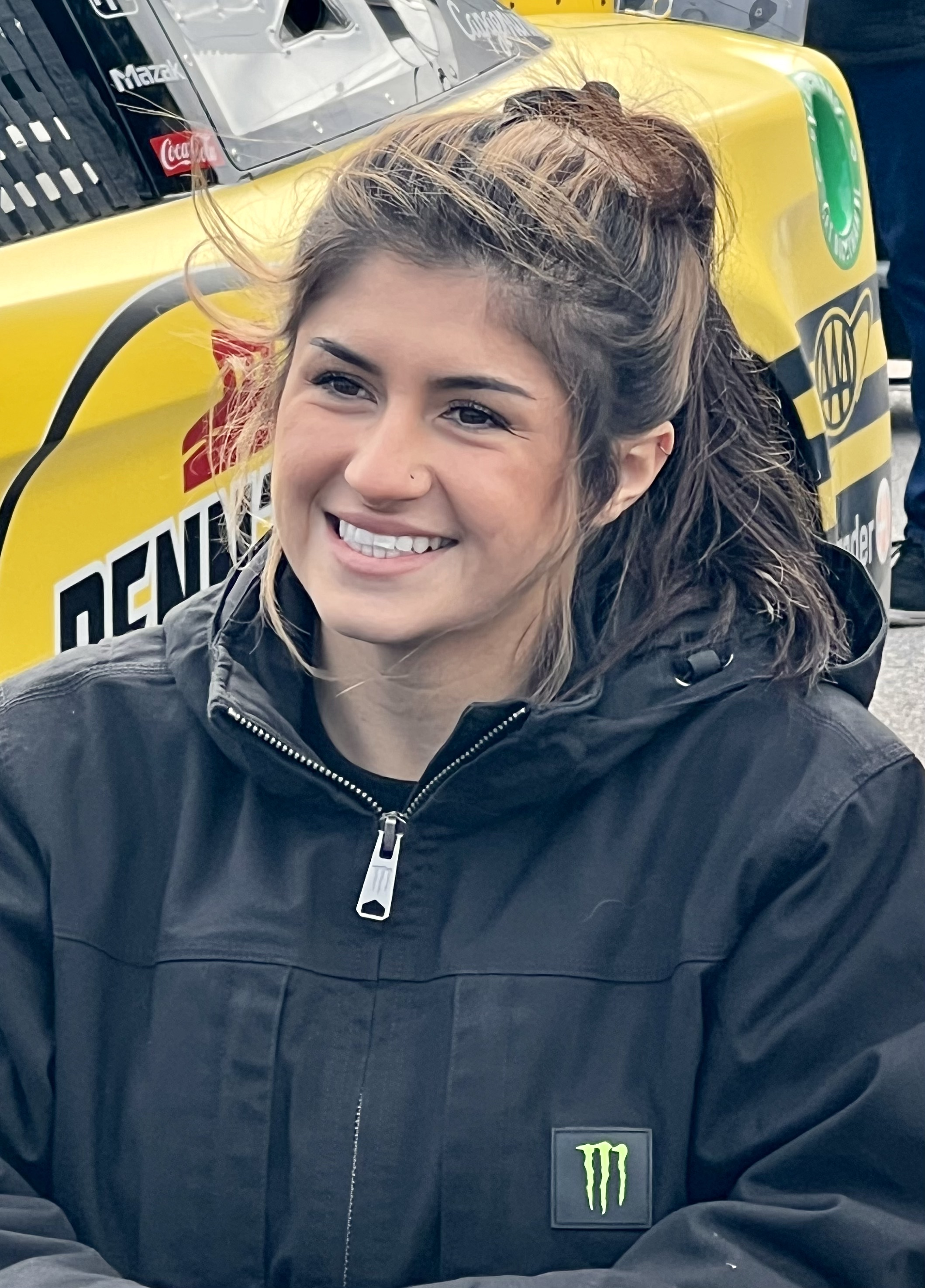
Johnny Benson Jr. (left) and Hailie Deegan (right) are tied for Most Popular Driver Awards in the Truck Series with three.

Year	Driver	Team	Notes
1995	Butch Miller	Liberty Racing	
1996	Jimmy Hensley	Grandaddy Racing	
1997	Ron Hornaday Jr.	Dale Earnhardt, Inc.	
1998	Stacy Compton	Impact Motorsports	
1999	Dennis Setzer	K Automotive Racing	
2000	Greg Biffle	Roush Racing	Won the series championship
2001	Joe Ruttman	Bobby Hamilton Racing	
2002	David Starr	Spears Motorsports	
2003	Brendan Gaughan	Orleans Racing	
2004	Steve Park	Orleans Racing	
2005	Ron Hornaday Jr.	Kevin Harvick Incorporated	
2006	Johnny Benson Jr.	Bill Davis Racing	
2007	Johnny Benson Jr.	Bill Davis Racing	
2008	Johnny Benson Jr.	Bill Davis Racing	Won the series championship
2009	Ricky Carmichael	Kevin Harvick Incorporated, Turner Motorsports	
2010	Narain Karthikeyan	Wyler Racing	The first non-American driver to win the award
2011	Austin Dillon	Richard Childress Racing	Won the series championship
2012	Nelson Piquet Jr.	Turner Motorsports	First South American winner
2013	Ty Dillon	Richard Childress Racing	
2014	Ryan Blaney	Brad Keselowski Racing	
2015	John Hunter Nemechek	SWM-NEMCO Motorsports	
2016	Tyler Reddick	Brad Keselowski Racing	
2017	Chase Briscoe	Brad Keselowski Racing	
2018	Noah Gragson	Kyle Busch Motorsports	
2019	Ross Chastain	Niece Motorsports	
2020	Zane Smith	GMS Racing	
2021	Hailie Deegan	David Gilliland Racing	The first female driver to win the Truck Series MPD. The second female driver to win the MPD overall.
2022	Hailie Deegan	David Gilliland Racing	
2023	Hailie Deegan	ThorSport Racing	
2024	Rajah Caruth	Spire Motorsports	The first African American to win the MPD.
2025	Rajah Caruth	Spire Motorsports	
2026	Layne Riggs	Front Row Motorsports	

=== Multiple winners ===
Driver	Cup	O’Reilly	Truck	Total
Bill Elliott	16	0	0	16
Dale Earnhardt Jr.	15	1	0	16
Chase Elliott*	8	2	0	10
Richard Petty	9	0	0	9
Bobby Allison	7	0	0	7
Justin Allgaier*	0	7	0	7
Elliott Sadler	0	4	0	4
Lee Petty	3	0	0	3
Brad Keselowski*	0	3	0	3
Jimmy Hensley	0	2	1	3
Ron Hornaday Jr.	0	1	2	3
Johnny Benson Jr.	0	0	3	3
Kenny Wallace	0	3	0	3
Hailie Deegan	0	0	3	3
Fred Lorenzen	2	0	0	2
Sam Ard	0	2	0	2
Joe Nemechek	0	2	0	2
Curtis Turner	2	0	0	2
Martin Truex Jr.	0	2	0	2
Darrell Waltrip	2	0	0	2
Greg Biffle	0	1	1	2
Noah Gragson*	0	1	1	2
Rajah Caruth*	0	0	2	2
* – still active as of 2025
