= Linda Vaughn =

American motor racing personality (born 1942)

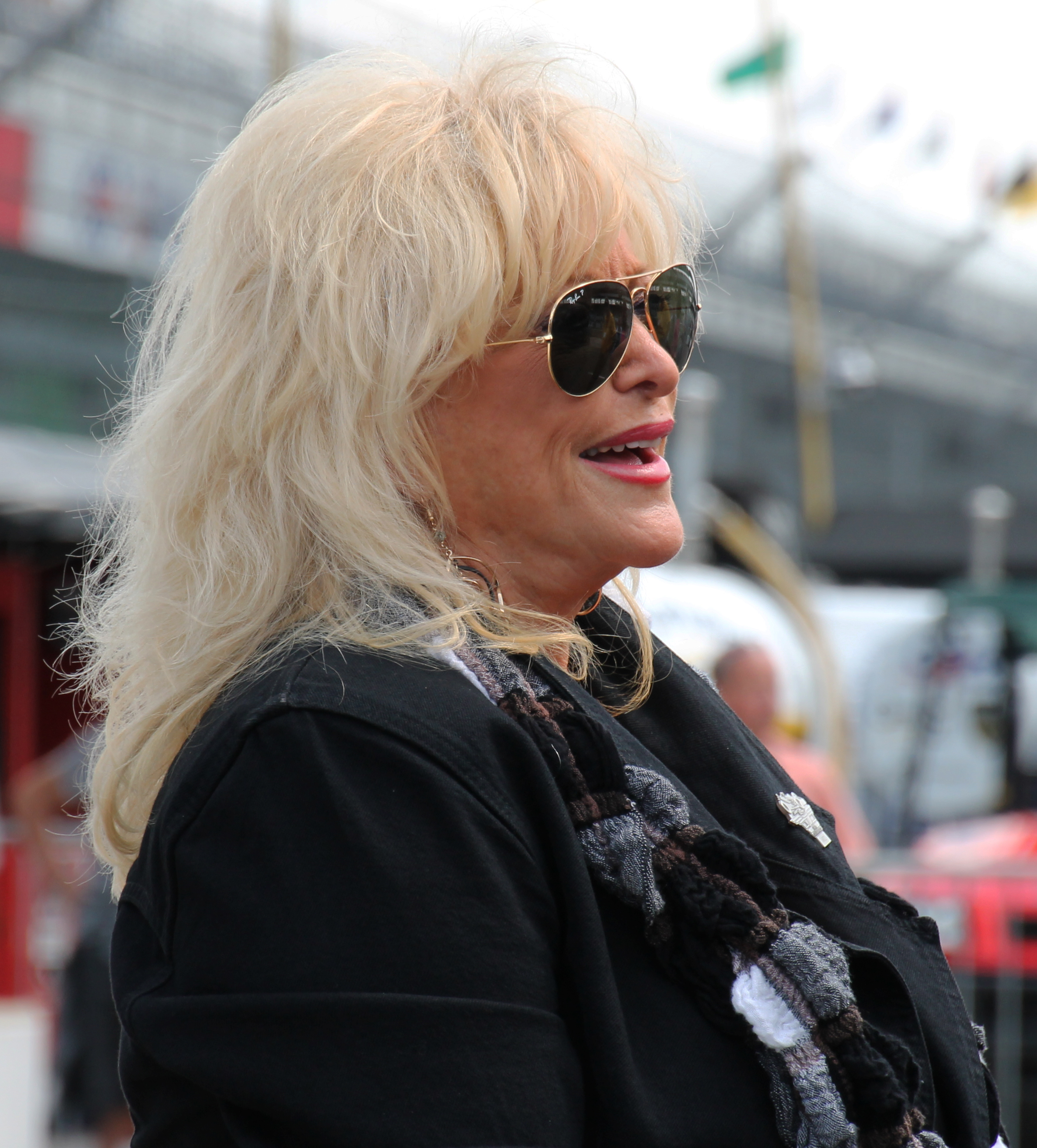
- Vaughn at the Indianapolis Motor Speedway, 2015
- Born: Linda Faye Vaughn; 1942 (age 83–84); Dalton, Georgia, United States
- Known for: Motor racing

Linda Faye Vaughn (born August 11, 1943 in Dalton, Georgia, United States) is an American motor racing personality who has been described as the "preeminent beauty queen of stock car racing", and "The First Lady of Motorsports".

== Career ==
Vaughn was named "Miss Queen of Speed at Atlanta International Raceway" when she was 18 and has acquired many other beauty titles since then, including "Miss Hurst Golden Shifter". She was chosen to be the queen of the 1961 Dixie 400. Vaughn has been a notable ambassador and promoter of various forms of American motor racing for several decades. She has worked closely with Hurst Industries, becoming a key part of the company's marketing.

Vaughn appeared in the 1976 film The Gumball Rally, the 1979 film Burnout, and the 1983 film Stroker Ace. She was interviewed for the book All Around the Track: Oral Histories of Drivers, Mechanics, Officials, Owners, Journalists and Others in Motorsports Past and Present by Anne B. Jones and Rex White.

Before beginning a professional career in motorsport, Vaughn worked full-time as a dental technician.

Vaughn is currently a public relations and marketing executive. She previously served as Vice President of public relations for Hurst. She co-authored her autobiography Linda Vaughn: The First Lady of Motorsports with Rob Kinnan.

== Personal life ==
Vaughn has her SCAA license. Vaughn has been public regarding her health issues. She was diagnosed with diabetes, had heart surgery, and recovered from cancer.

Vaughn married drag racer Billy Tidwell on December 2, 1972; they divorced in 1986.

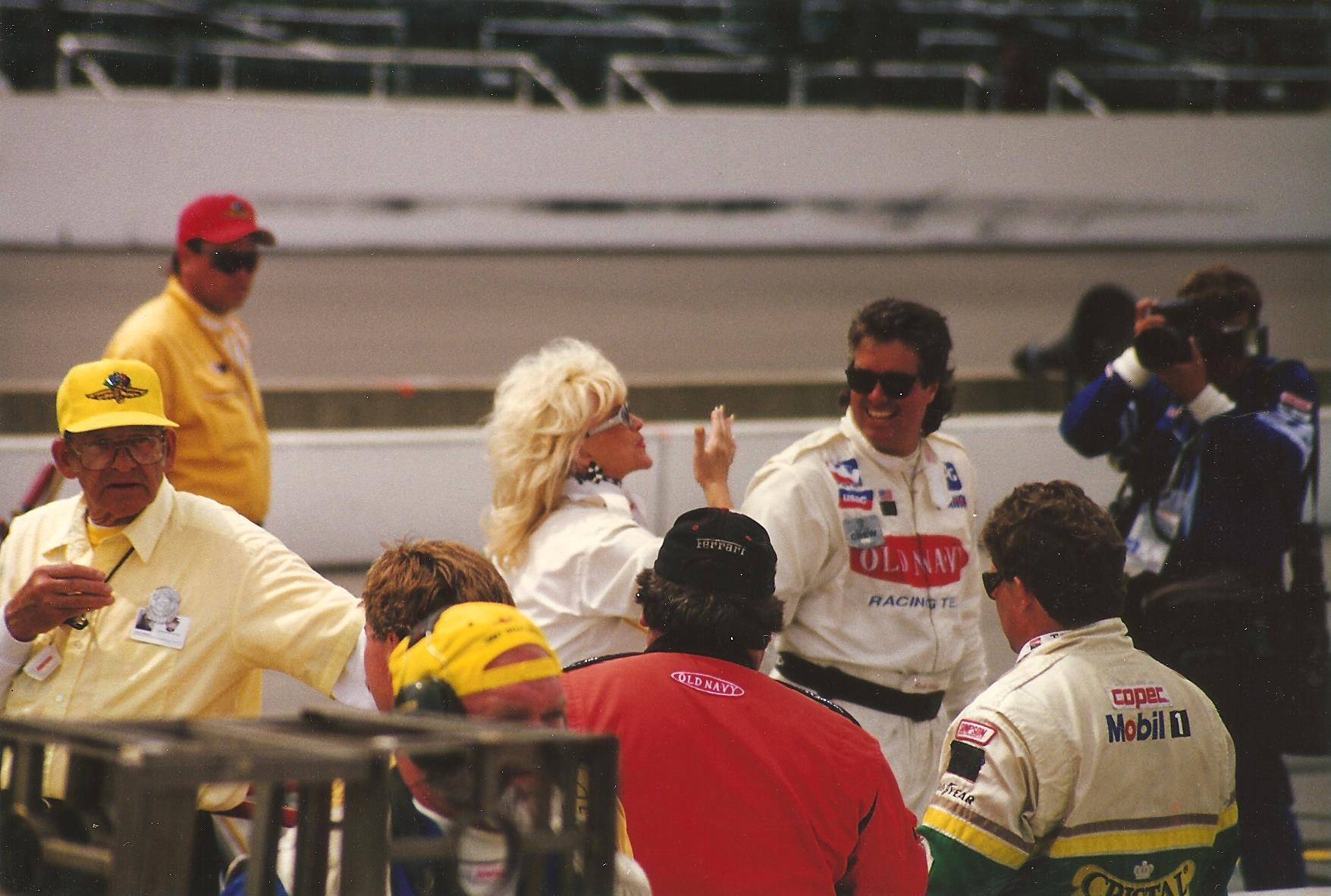
Linda Vaughn at the 1997 Indianapolis 500

== Awards ==
- She was inducted into the Motorsports Hall of Fame of America in 2019.
- She was inducted into the West Coast Stock Car Hall of Fame in 2020.
