= 1961 Greenville 200 =

Auto race held at Greenville-Pickens Speedway in 1961

Race details
- Race 10 of 52 in the 1961 NASCAR Grand National Series season
- Date: April 1, 1961
- Official name: Greenville 200
- Location: Greenville-Pickens Speedway (Greenville, South Carolina)
- Course: Dirt oval
- Course length: 0.500 miles (0.805 km)
- Distance: 200 laps, 100.000 mi (160.934 km)
- Weather: Chilly with temperatures of 62.1 °F (16.7 °C); wind speeds of 20 miles per hour (32 km/h)
- Average speed: 52.189 miles per hour (83.990 km/h)
- Attendance: 5,000

Pole position
Driver	Junior Johnson	Rex Lovette

Most laps led
Driver	Rex White	Rex White
- Laps: 106

Winner
No. 85	Emanuel Zervakis	Monroe Shook

The 1961 Greenville 200 was a NASCAR Grand National Series event that was held on April 1, 1961, at Greenville-Pickens Speedway in Greenville, South Carolina.

== Race report ==
After nearly two hours of racing 200 laps, Emanuel Zervakis emerged as the winner as he managed to defeat Richard Petty by an unknown margin in front of a crowd of 5000 people. This would make the first of two career victories for Zervakis and the only time that a driver with the number 85 to have two career victories in NASCAR Cup Series history. All 21 of the drivers on the grid were American-born males. Doug Yates would receive the last-place finish due to a driveshaft issue on the eighth lap. Other notable names who competed were: Junior Johnson, Roy Tyner, and Ned Jarrett. Johnson would qualify for the pole position with speeds up to 62.09 miles per hour (99.92 km/h) during the qualifying sessions. Four cautions slowed the race for 20 laps; there was only one crash during the entire race.

Bob Barron was a middle-aged rookie who started in 20th place and finished in 18th place. After the 1961 NASCAR Grand National Series season, Barron attempted to do only one more NASCAR Cup Series race while making attempts to look into it further.

Zervakis would make his first win in his NASCAR career at this racing event. Bud Allman was one of the notable crew chiefs at the race; he worked on Ned Jarrett's #11 Ford vehicle.

The transition to purpose-built racecars began in the early 1960s and occurred gradually over that decade. Changes made to the sport by the late 1960s brought an end to the "strictly stock" vehicles of the 1950s.

=== Qualifying ===
Grid	No.	Driver	Manufacturer	Owner
1	27	Junior Johnson	'60 Pontiac	Rex Lovette
2	85	Emanuel Zervakis	'60 Chevrolet	Monroe Shook
3	47	Jack Smith	'61 Pontiac	Jack Smith
4	4	Rex White	'60 Chevrolet	Rex White
5	43	Richard Petty	'60 Plymouth	Petty Enterprises
6	23	Doug Yates	'59 Plymouth	Raeford Johnson
7	86	Buck Baker	'61 Chrysler	Buck Baker
8	67	David Pearson	'60 Chevrolet	G.C. Spencer
9	11	Ned Jarrett	'60 Ford	B.G. Holloway
10	48	G.C. Spencer	'60 Chevrolet	G.C. Spencer
11	54	Jimmy Pardue	'59 Chevrolet	Jimmy Pardue
12	2	Tommy Irwin	'67 Ford T-Bird	Tom Daniels
13	17	Fred Harb	'59 Ford	Fred Harb
14	9	Roy Tyner	'60 Ford	Roy Tyner
15	0	Bobby Waddell	'59 Dodge	Bobby Waddell
16	1	Paul Lewis	'61 Chevrolet	Jess Potter
17	35	George Green	'59 Plymouth	M.J. Black
18	62	Curtis Crider	'59 Plymouth	Curtis Crider
19	19	Herman Beam	'60 Ford	Herman Beam
20	71	Bob Barron	'60 Dodge	Bob Barron
21	30	Doug Cox	'59 Ford T-Bird	Doug Cox

== Finishing order ==
Section reference:

1. Emanuel Zervakis (No. 85)
2. Richard Petty (No. 43)
3. Rex White (No. 4)
4. G.C. Spencer (No. 48)
5. Buck Baker (No. 86)
6. Jimmy Pardue (No. 54)
7. Fred Harb (No. 17)
8. George Green (No. 35)
9. Bobby Waddell (No. 0)
10. David Pearson (No. 67)
11. Curtis Crider (No. 62)
12. Doug Cox (No. 30)
13. Herman Beam (No. 19)
14. Ned Jarrett (No. 11)
15. Roy Tyner (No. 9)
16. Junior Johnson (No. 27)
17. Tommy Irwin (No. 2)
18. Bob Barron (No. 71)
19. Jack Smith (No. 47)
20. Paul Lewis (No. 1)
21. Doug Yates (No. 23)

== Timeline ==
Section reference:

- Start of race: Junior Johnson started the race with the pole position.
- Lap 8: Doug Yates had troubles with his driveshaft, making him the last-place finisher.
- Lap 33: Paul Lewis suffered a terminal crash, forcing him to leave the event prematurely.
- Lap 49: Jack Smith's engine blew in his racing vehicle.
- Lap 54: Bob Barron's vehicle had a faulty clutch.
- Lap 68: Tommy Irwin's problematic steering caused him to exit the race prematurely.
- Lap 69: Junior Johnson developed fuel pump problems on this lap, ending his day on the track.
- Lap 70: Rex White takes over the lead from Junior Johnson.
- Lap 99: Roy Tyner had to leave the race due to transmission issues.
- Lap 100: Ned Jarrett managed to overheat his vehicle, causing his early departure from the race.
- Lap 149: Axle problems forced Herman Bean to drop out of the race.
- Lap 176: Emanuel Zervakis takes over the lead from Rex White.
- Lap 181: David Pearson ran out of gasoline, causing him to exit the race.
- Finish: Emanuel Zervakis was officially declared the winner of the event.

Preceded by 1961 Atlanta 500	NASCAR Grand National races 1961	Succeeded by 1961 untitled race at Orange Speedway
