= Rex White =

American racing driver (1929–2025)

- Born: August 17, 1929; Taylorsville, North Carolina, U.S.
- Died: July 18, 2025 (aged 95); Taylorsville, North Carolina, U.S.
- Height: 5 ft 4 in (163 cm)
- Weight: 135 lb (61 kg)
- Achievements: 1960 Grand National Series Champion; Led Grand National Series in wins (1960 – 6); 69% Career Top 10 rate Smallest champion in NASCAR history (5'4", 135 lbs)
- Awards: 1960 NASCAR's Most Popular Driver Award; NMPA Hall of Fame; Georgia Racing Hall of Fame; Named one of NASCAR's 50 Greatest Drivers (1998); NASCAR Hall of Fame (2015) Named one of NASCAR's 75 Greatest Drivers (2023)

NASCAR Cup Series career
- 233 races run over 9 years
- Best finish: 1st (1960)
- First race: 1956 Race 6 (Daytona Beach)
- Last race: 1964 Dixie 400 (Atlanta)
- First win: 1958 Race 1 (Fayetteville)
- Last win: 1962 Dixie 400 (Atlanta)
Wins	Top tens	Poles
28	163	36

NASCAR Convertible Division career
- 5 races run over 1 year
- Best finish: 51st (1959)
- First race: 1959 Catawba 250 (Hickory)
- Last race: 1959 Old Dominion 500 (Martinsville)
- First win: 1959 Race #5 (Marlboro)
Wins	Top tens	Poles
1	3	1
- Statistics up to date as of February 21, 2013.

Rex Allen White (August 17, 1929 – July 18, 2025) was an American auto racer and NASCAR champion. White was one of the drivers who competed for the original Chevrolet racing team. He began racing in 1956, grabbing fourteen top-ten finishes. After a part-time run in 1957, White won twice in 1958. His most notable year came in 1960, when he won six races, and the NASCAR Grand National Series championship. When he retired in 1964, he had acquired 28 career victories. Throughout most of White's NASCAR career, he drove General Motors brand cars, typically painted gold and white, sporting the number "4" on the side. After he retired, White was inducted into the National Motorsports Press Association (NMPA) Hall of Fame in 1974, and was named one of NASCAR's 50 Greatest Drivers in 1998.

== Background ==
White was born on August 17, 1929, and raised in Taylorsville, North Carolina. White said that at the age of eight, he was working on his family's Model T. "I was unaware the car on which I labored represented hope to people around me, frustration to those trying to stop illegal moonshine. I saw automobiles as transportation, not the symbol of an upcoming billion-dollar sport." White was born during the Great Depression, and suffered from polio as a young boy. The polio left one leg withered, but when speaking about it White said: "Most of the lessons I have learned have stayed with me all my life. The biggest one was how to conquer fear." Rex learned how to drive by piloting a neighbor's truck in the fields where he lived when he was 6 years old, and often pretended to drive while sitting in the family Model T, imagining that he was on a race track. White's looks have at times been compared to those of comedian George Gobel.

White died in Taylorsville, North Carolina, on July 18, 2025, at the age of 95.

== Racing career ==
In 1954, White got his first car when one of his wife's relatives helped him scrape together the $600 he needed for an old 1937 Ford. Within a year he was making enough at the race-tracks to survive. White ran his first race in the Sportsman division at West Lanham Speedway in Maryland. He was forced to drop out of the race due to engine problems. By the time the season was over, White, as a rookie, had won the Sportsman championship at the 1/5-mile high-banked oval.

=== NASCAR ===
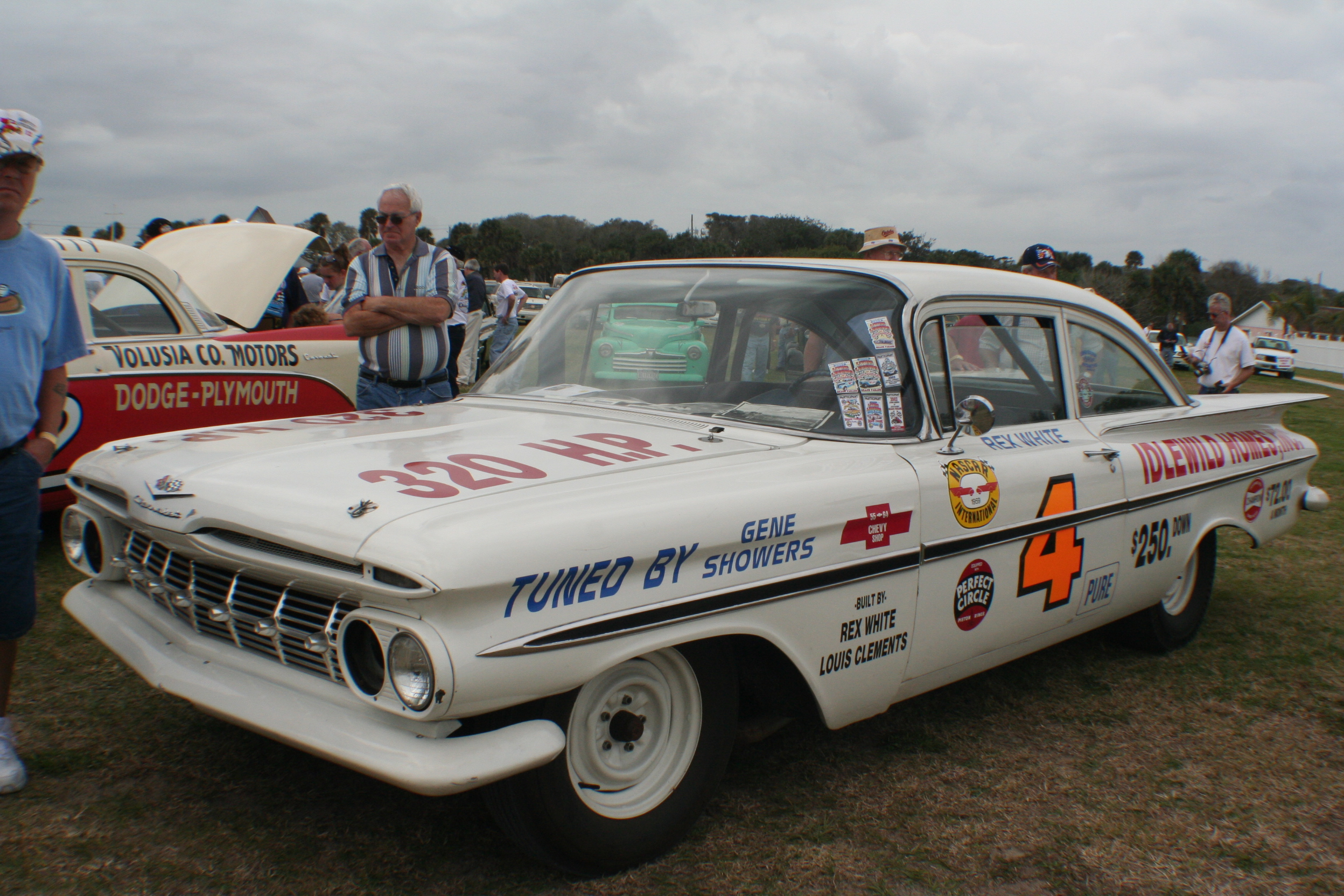
Replica of White's 1959 NASCAR car

White started racing in NASCAR in 1956, when the premier stock-car racing sport was known as the Grand National division. He started 24 races in 1956 and finished in the top-ten on 14 occasions, as well as finishing second in the final NASCAR Short Track standings, a lower division of the NASCAR Grand Nationals.

White competed in only 9 of 53 events in 1957; but finished in the top-ten in six of those events, with four of those finishes being in the top 5.

In 1958, White moved from Washington to Spartanburg in order to join forces with Louis Clements, his friend, partner, and chief mechanic. White and Clements proceeded to build their first late-model Chevy, and started competing together in the NASCAR circuit. They met a year or so earlier when both were working for Chevrolet's factory racing team, an enterprise that retired from racing in June 1957, when Detroit and Chevy temporarily withdrew its financial backing to the industry. White competed a total of 22 times of the 55 races that year, winning his first NASCAR race at the season-opening event at the Champion Speedway in Fayetteville, NC.

At the age of 29, White ran in 23 of 44 NASCAR races, winning five times and capturing five pole positions. He finished the season with 11 top-fives and 13 top-ten finishes.

White's first and only championship came in 1960, and his first win of the season occurred in the ninth event of the season. Through the remainder of the season, White won six more of his 28 career victories. White finished outside the top-ten in finishing position only five times throughout the 40 starts of that 1960 season, winning the championship. By the end of that 1960 season, he also notched the Most Popular Driver Award, and the Driver of the Year awards. White, in his gold and white 1960 chevy, secured his championship just prior to the season-ending Atlanta 500 mile event. White's championship hopes improved dramatically in the inaugural World 600 (now named the Coca-Cola 600), when his chief rivals, Richard Petty, Junior Johnson, Lee Petty, and three other drivers were disqualified for not making a proper entrance to pit road at the Charlotte Motor Speedway. White eventually finished the 600-mile event in sixth place. White's check for winning the 1960 NASCAR championship totaled $13,000.

In 1961, White won seven races, and finished second in points. He competed in a total of 47 of 55 events that year, and notched a total of 29 top-fives, and a career best 39 top-ten finishes.

White competed in 37 events throughout the 1962 season, winning a career-best eight times, and finished the season fifth in points. When reflecting back on his racing career, White considered his victory at the 1962 Atlanta speedway one of his best: "My best finish was over Marvin Panch in the 4 car right here in Atlanta in the 1962 Dixie 400. The last fuel stop was out of sequence and my crew chief put on the pit board that he questioned my gas. ... So I knew we weren't going to make it to the end without fueling. I hung on to Marvin and just drafted. He ran out of gas with two laps to go, and I went all the way to the bank."

In 1963, White was unable to win a race for the first time since the 1957 season, but still managed to finish ninth in points, and notch 14 more top-ten finishes. From 1959 through the 1963 season, White won more races (28) than any other driver; including legends Lee and Richard Petty, Ned Jarrett, Fireball Roberts, Junior Johnson, Curtis Turner, Joe Weatherly and Buck Baker.

White was known for running up front even if he did not finish. He was also recognized as one of the first drivers to focus on the goal of the Grand National Series title. Despite racing without substantial backing, he captured 36 poles and had total of 28 career victories in 233 starts. White finished in the top-ten in the point standings six of the nine years he competed in NASCAR's Grand National Series.

==== NASCAR career statistics ====
Year	Races/of	Wins	Poles	Top 5	Top 10	Laps led	Start	Finish	Winnings	Season rank
1956	24 / 56	0	1	3	14	0	14.3	12.0	$5,333	11
1957	9 / 53	0	1	4	6	193	18.1	10.8	$3,870	21
1958	22 / 51	2	7	13	17	471	5.1	8.1	$12,232	7
1959	23 / 44	5	5	11	13	827	7.4	10.2	$12,360	10
1960	40 / 44	6	3	25	35	541	6.4	5.3	$57,525	1
1961	47 / 52	7	7	29	38	1224	7.6	7.0	$56,395	2
1962	37 / 53	8	9	18	23	1129	6.7	9.9	$36,245	5
1963	25 / 55	0	3	5	14	171	7.7	12.2	$27.241	9
1964	6 / 62	0	1	2	3	27	11.2	13.7	$12,310	28
Totals	233	28	36	110	163	4583	8.1	9.0	$223,511	
Data as of March 2008

== Legacy ==
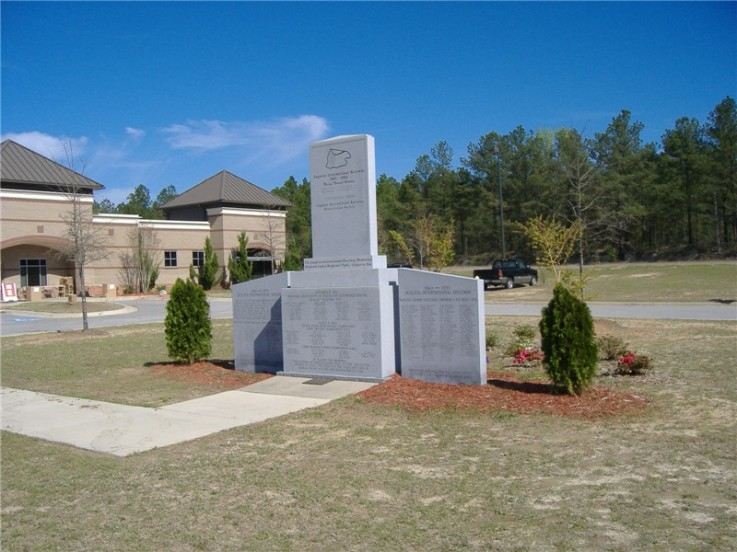
Rex White Motorsports Memorial Plaza

Standing only five feet, four inches (1.6 m) and weighing 135 pounds, White remains the smallest man to ever capture the NASCAR championship as of 2025. After 10 years and over 36,000 miles of racing in 233 races, White accumulated 28 wins, 110 top-five finishes, and 163 top-ten finishes. White is considered by NASCAR as one of its top 50 drivers, a winner of the Living Legends of Auto Racing Pioneers awards, and the Smokey Yunick Pioneer award. White was also a member of the National Motorsports Press Association Hall of Fame at Darlington, and the Georgia Automobile Racing Hall of Fame. White's 163 top-ten finishes in 233 races, which calculates to about 70%, is unlikely to be topped due to the parity and longevity of today's drivers. Only Tim Flock comes close to such record numbers.

White authored his autobiography titled Gold Thunder, and teamed with editor Ann Jones for a second book covering 58 memoirs of past and present NASCAR legends titled All Around The Track.

In January 2015, White was selected as an inductee to the NASCAR Hall of Fame. At the time, White was NASCAR's "oldest living champion at 85 years of age". White retained that title until his death at age 95 in 2025.

== Motorsports career results ==
=== NASCAR ===
(key) (Bold – Pole position awarded by qualifying time. Italics – Pole position earned by points standings or practice time. * – Most laps led. ** – All laps led.)

==== Grand National Series ====
NASCAR Grand National Series results
Year	Team	No.	Make	1	2	3	4	5	6	7	8	9	10	11	12	13	14	15	16	17	18	19	20	21	22	23	24	25	26	27	28	29	30	31	32	33	34	35	36	37	38	39	40	41	42	43	44	45	46	47	48	49	50	51	52	53	54	55	56	57	58	59	60	61	62	NGNC	Pts	Ref
1956	Max Welborn	X	Chevy	HCY	CLT	WSS	PBS	ASF	DAB; 22	PBS; 8	WIL; 8	ATL	NWS; 19		RCH; 9	CLB; 8	CON; 5	**GPS**; 7	HCY	HBO; 13	MAR; 6	LIN	CLT; 21	POR	EUR	NYF	MER	MAS	CLT	MCF	POR	AWS; 19	RSP; 9	PIF	CSF	CHI	CCF; 6	MGY	OKL	ROA; 11	OBS; 17	SAN	NOR; 3	PIF; 3	MYB	POR		CSH; 10	CLT; 8																	11th	4642	
1956	Max Welborn	10	Chevy											LAN; 25																																	DAR; 11			LAN; 8	POR	CLB	HBO	NWP	CLT	CCF										11th	4642	
1956	Max Welborn	X	Ford																																																						MAR; 32	HCY	WIL							11th	4642	
1957	Max Welborn	44	Chevy	WSS	CON	TIC	DAB; 9	CON	WIL	HBO	AWS	NWS	LAN	CLT	PIF	GBF	POR	CCF	RCH; 20	MAR	POR	EUR	LIN	LCS	ASP	NWP	CLB	CPS	PIF	JAC	RSP	CLT	MAS	POR	HCY	NOR	LCS	GLN	KPC	LIN	**OBS**; 2*	MYB	DAR; 28	NYF	AWS; 4	CSF	SCF	LAN; 4	CLB	CCF	CLT	MAR; 4	NBR	CON	NWS; 8	GBF; 18										21st	2508	
1958	Julian Petty	44	Chevy	FAY; 1	DAB	CON	FAY; 6	WIL	HBO	FAY; 26	CLB	PIF	ATL	CLT	MAR; 2	ODS; 3	OBS; 3	GPS	GBF	STR; 2	NWS; 3	BGS; 2*	TRN	RSD	CLB	NBS	REF			**AWS**; 1*	RSP; 3	MCC; 3	SLS	**TOR**; 7*	**BUF**; 5	**MCF**; 21	**BEL**; 2	BRR	CLB																											7th	6552	
1958	Jim Parsley	70	Chevy																									LIN; 11	HCY																																					7th	6552	
1958	Rex White	11	Chevy																																					**NSV**; 23*	AWS; 37	BGS	MBS																							7th	6552	
1958	Rex White	40	Chevy																																									DAR; 7	CLT	BIR; 7	CSF	GAF	RCH	HBO	SAS	MAR; 3	NWS	ATL												7th	6552	
1959	Rex White	40	Chevy	FAY; 10																																																														10th	5526	
1959	Rex White	4	Chevy		DAY; 10	DAY; 26	HBO	CON; 14	ATL	WIL	**BGS**; 3	CLB	NWS	REF; 19		MAR; 15	TRN	CLT	**NSV**; 1	ASP	PIF	GPS	ATL	CLB	WIL	RCH	BGS; 1**	AWS; 1	DAY; 23	HEI; 2*	CLT	MBS	CLT	**NSV**; 24*	**AWS**; 5	**BGS**; 1**	GPS	CLB	DAR; 17	HCY; 3	RCH	CSF		MAR; 1*	AWS; 4	NWS; 2																				10th	5526	
1959	Lund Racing	5	Chevy												HCY; 21																																																			10th	5526	
1959	Beau Morgan	15	Ford																																								HBO; 17				CON; 14																			10th	5526	
1960	Beau Morgan	15	Ford	CLT; 14	CLB	DAY																																																												1st	21164	
1960	Rex White	4	Chevy				DAY; 4	DAY; 9	CLT; 2	NWS; 2	PHO	CLB; 1	MAR; 4	**HCY**; 14	WIL; 4	BGS; 2	GPS; 9	AWS; 7	DAR; 3	PIF; 12	HBO; 11	RCH; 2		CLT; 6	BGS; 3	DAY; 6	HEI; 3	MAB; 1*	MBS; 3	ATL; 23		**NSV**; 2	AWS; 1	PIF; 5	CLB; 1	SBO; 3	BGS; 4	DAR; 2	HCY; 3	CSF	GSP; 6	HBO; 3	MAR; 1	**NWS**; 1	CLT; 6	RCH; 8	ATL; 5																			1st	21164	
1960	Scotty Cain	41	Ford																				HMS; 8																																											1st	21164	
1960	L. D. Austin	74	Chevy																												BIR; 9																																			1st	21164	
1961	White-Clements Racing	4	Chevy	CLT; 2	JSP; 3	DAY; 21	DAY	DAY; 12	PIF; 7	**AWS**; 1**		ATL; 2	GPS; 3*	HBO; 5	BGS; 1*		NWS; 1*	CLB; 5	HCY; 3	RCH; 10	**MAR**; 9	DAR; 24	CLT; 14	CLT	RSD	ASP	CLT; 3	PIF; 10	BIR; 4	GPS; 8	BGS; 1	**NOR**; 2	HAS; 3	**STR**; 2	DAY; 23	ATL; 10	CLB; 14	MBS; 10	BRI; 25	**NSV**; 23	BGS; 1	AWS; 3	RCH; 4	SBO; 5		**HCY**; 1	RCH; 3	CSF	ATL; 18		NWS; 1*	CLT; 5	BRI; 2	GPS; 3	HBO; 2											2nd	26442	
1961	White-Clements Racing	47	Chevy								HMS; 6																																																							2nd	26442	
1961	White-Clements Racing	4	Ford													**MAR**; 2*																																																		2nd	26442	
1961	White-Clements Racing	47	Pontiac																																										DAR; 10																					2nd	26442	
1961	White-Clements Racing	4	Pontiac																																															MAR; 2																2nd	26442	
1962	White-Clements Racing	4	Chevy	CON; 4	AWS; 1*	DAY	DAY; 3	DAY; 7	CON; 15	**AWS**; 18	**SVH**; 5	HBO; 1	RCH; 1	CLB; 6	NWS; 31	GPS; 17	MBS	MAR; 3	**BGS**; 1**	BRI; 29	RCH; 13*	HCY; 2	CON; 20	DAR; 27	PIF	CLT; 11	ATL; 21	**BGS**; 2	AUG	**RCH**; 2*	SBO; 1*	DAY; 11	CLB; 1	**ASH**; 17*	GPS; 5	AUG	SVH	MBS	BRI; 7	CHT	NSV	HUN	AWS; 3	STR	BGS	PIF	VAL	DAR; 9	HCY; 1*	**RCH**; 5	DTS	AUG	MAR; 27	NWS; 8	CLT; 30	ATL; 1										5th	19424	
1963	White-Clements Racing	4	Chevy	BIR; 7	**GGS**; 13	THS	RSD; 15	DAY	DAY; 2	DAY; 14	PIF	AWS	HBO	ATL; 6	HCY	BRI; 24	AUG	**RCH**; 3	GPS	SBO	BGS	**MAR**; 11	NWS; 7	CLB	THS	DAR; 31	ODS	RCH	CLT; 3	BIR	ATL; 6																																			9th	20976	
1963	White-Clements Racing	4	Mercury																													DAY; 21	MBS	SVH	DTS	BGS	ASH	OBS; 2	BRR; 7	BRI; 9	GPS	NSV; 17	CLB	AWS	PIF	BGS	ONA	DAR; 6	HCY; 22	RCH; 2	MAR; 25	DTS	NWS; 7	THS	CLT; 9	SBO	HBO	RSD; 37								9th	20976	
1964	White-Clements Racing	4	Mercury	CON	AUG; 26	JSP	SVH	RSD	DAY	DAY	DAY	RCH																																																						28th	8222	
1964	Bud Moore Engineering	4	Mercury										BRI; 9	GPS	BGS									DAR; 21	LGY	HCY	SBO	CLT; 3	GPS	ASH	ATL; 5	CON	NSV	CHT	BIR	VAL	PIF	DAY	ODS	OBS	BRR	ISP	GLN	LIN	BRI	NSV	MBS	AWS	DTS	ONA	CLB	BGS	STR	DAR	HCY	RCH	ODS	HBO	MAR	SVH	NWS	CLT	HAR	AUG	JAC	28th	8222	
1964	Bud Moore Engineering	01	Mercury													ATL; 18	AWS	HBO	PIF	CLB	NWS	MAR	SVH																																											28th	8222	

===== Daytona 500 =====
Year	Team	Manufacturer	Start	Finish
1959	Rex White	Chevrolet	19	26
1960	Rex White	Chevrolet	8	9
1961	White-Clements Racing	Chevrolet	41	12
1962	White-Clements Racing	Chevrolet	8	7
1963	White-Clements Racing	Chevrolet	6	14

Preceded by Lee Petty	NASCAR Grand National Series Champion; 1960	Succeeded by Ned Jarrett
