= Woodie Wilson =

American stock car racing driver (1925–1994)

- Born: October 8, 1925; Mobile, Alabama, U.S.
- Died: September 13, 1994 (aged 68); Mobile, Alabama, U.S.
- Cause of death: Cancer
- Achievements: Alabama Racing Pioneers Hall of Fame
- Awards: 1961 NASCAR Cup Series Rookie of the Year

NASCAR Cup Series career
- 10 races run over 4 years
- Best finish: 41st (1961)
- First race: 1949 Race #2 (Daytona Beach)
- Last race: 1962 Dixie 400 (Atlanta)
Wins	Top tens	Poles
0	2	0

W. Woodrow Wilson (October 8, 1925 – September 13, 1994) was an American stock car racing driver. One of the pioneers of NASCAR, he competed in the Grand National Division. There is little known of his life, even during his racing career.
