= Bob Barron =

American racing driver

- Born: January 13, 1928; American Falls, Idaho, U.S.
- Died: August 2, 1991 (aged 63); Bradenton, Florida, U.S.

NASCAR Cup Series career
- 32 races run over 2 years
- Best finish: 29th - 1961
- First race: 1960 National 400 (Charlotte)
- Last race: 1961 Wilkes 200 (North Wilkesboro Speedway)
Wins	Top tens	Poles
	5

Robert Frank Barron (January 13, 1928 – August 2, 1991) was a NASCAR driver from Bradenton, Florida.

== Life and career ==
Barron was born in American Falls, Idaho in January 1928. He served in the U.S. Navy during World War II.

Barron completed in thirty-two Grand National/Nextel Cup Series events in his career, earning five top-tens.

Barron debuted to NASCAR in 1960, racing his own car in the fall race at Charlotte. Starting 46th in the fifty-car field, Barron completed most of the race before finishing 30th with mechanical woes.

The rest of Barron's starts came in 1961, when Barron completed 31 of the 52 races in the season en route to a 29th-place effort in the points. He earned a ninth-place effort in his season debut at Charlotte Fairgrounds. He would finish ninth twice more in the year, along with a career-best eighth place showing at Richmond and Birmingham, his only career top-tens.

Barron did the most with his limited resources, finishing 19 of his 32 career starts, but ran out of funds following the 1961 season and retired. He died in Brandenton in August 1991 at the age of 63.
