= Ralph Earnhardt =

American racing driver (1928–1973)

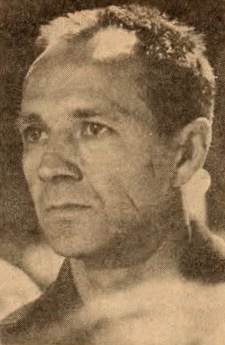
- Earnhardt in the early 1970s
- Born: Ralph Lee Earnhardt; February 23, 1928; Kannapolis, North Carolina, U.S.
- Died: September 26, 1973 (aged 45); Kannapolis, North Carolina, U.S.
- Achievements: 1956 NASCAR Late Model Sportsman Division Champion; 1959, 1960 NASCAR Limited Sportsman Division Champion
- Awards: National Motorsports Press Association's Hall of Fame (1989); International Motorsports Hall of Fame (1997); Named one of NASCAR's 50 Greatest Drivers (1998); Oceanside Rotary Club of Daytona Beach Stock Car Racing Hall of Fame (2004); National Dirt Late Model Hall of Fame (2007); Named one of NASCAR's 75 Greatest Drivers (2023)

NASCAR Cup Series career
- 51 races run over 6 years
- Best finish: 17th (1961)
- First race: 1956 Buddy Shuman 250 (Hickory)
- Last race: 1964 Race No. 29 (Concord)
Wins	Top tens	Poles
0	16	1

Ralph Lee Earnhardt (February 23, 1928 – September 26, 1973) was an American stock car racer and patriarch of the Earnhardt racing family. He was the father of seven-time NASCAR Cup Series champion Dale Earnhardt, grandfather of Kerry Earnhardt, Kelley Earnhardt Miller, and Dale Earnhardt Jr.

Earnhardt is considered one of NASCAR's all-time winningest drivers with over 350 NASCAR-sanctioned victories. In addition to his driving accomplishments, he served as a mentor to other racers of his time. A skilled craftsman, he built cars and engines for his competitors and served as a teammate and mentor to future NASCAR Hall of Famer, Bobby Isaac.

== Background ==
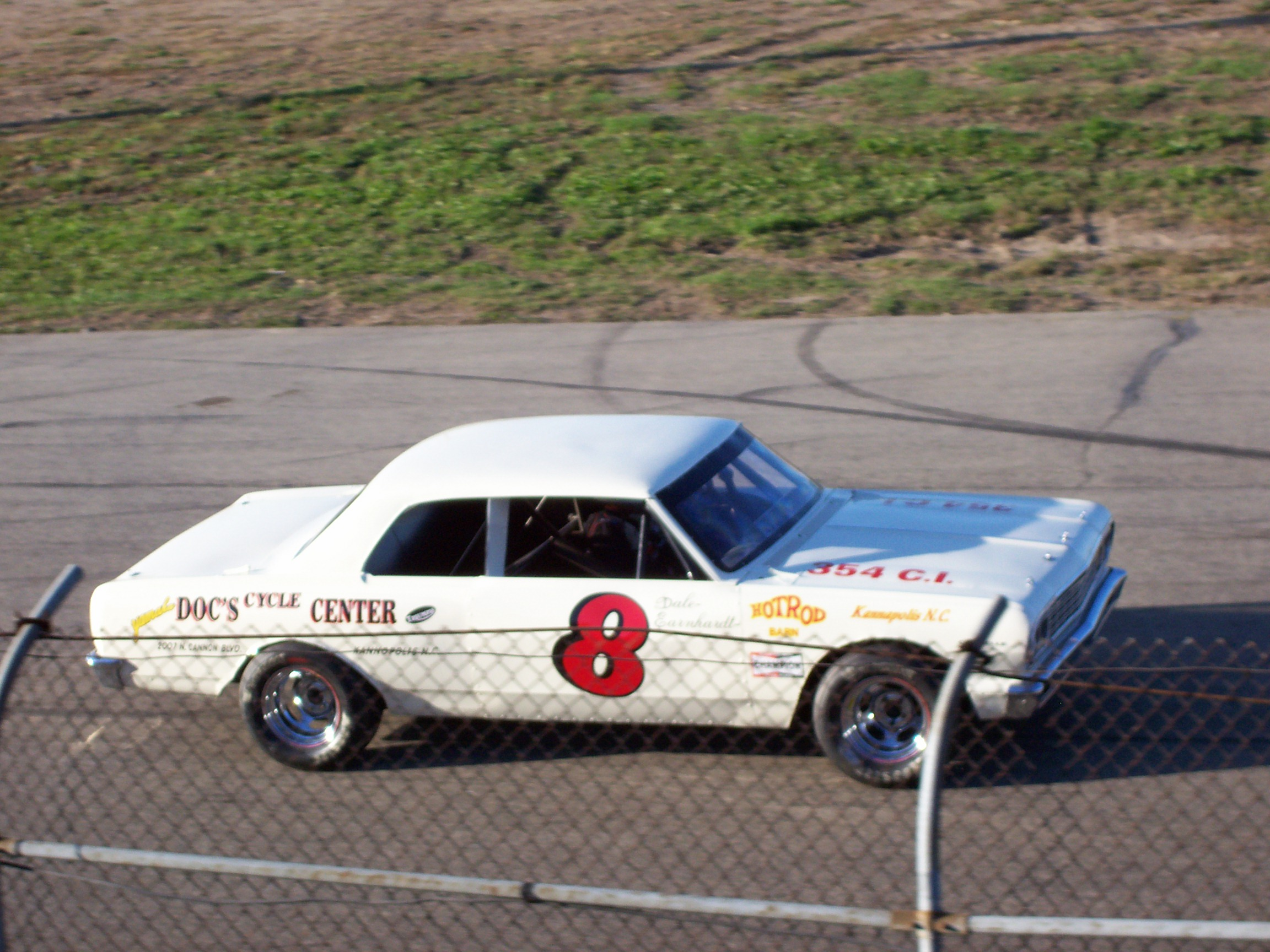
Ralph Earnhardt replica car

Earnhardt had German ancestry. He spent many years working in a cotton mill in North Carolina. One of the only ways out of this poor living was racing. Ralph started his racing career on dirt tracks where he was famous for keeping his car in top condition throughout each race.

== Racing career ==
Earnhardt began racing in 1949, and in 1953 it became his full-time occupation. Earnhardt got his start in racing when he was asked to help build an engine for a local driver. "A boy in Kannapolis wanted me to help him build a racing engine. When we finished it, I got in, revved it up and took off. The man who owned the car (a 1934 Ford coupe) offered me a chance to drive it. I ran third in the heat race the first time I got on a track then won the consolation and finished fourth in the main event."

An early mentor of Earnhardt's was Red Vogt who helped him get a good engine and gave advice.

Earnhardt finished second in the 1955 NASCAR Sportsman National Standings behind Billy Myers. In 1956, Earnhardt won the Sportsman National championship, having won 34 of his 76 starts that year.

Earnhardt made his NASCAR Grand National debut at Hickory in November 1956. He was serving as a replacement for Fireball Roberts who was committed to racing in a Grand National event at Willow Springs International Motorsports Park on that same day. Earnhardt won the pole position as the race's fastest qualifier in his debut, but trailed Speedy Thompson for much of the event. On the final lap, the flagman incorrectly waved the white flag for Earnhardt, showing him as the leader, before being corrected by a fellow scorer. This created a confusion where the crowd thought Earnhardt was the race leader and was outraged when Speedy Thompson was declared the winner and Earnhardt in second. As Earnhardt competed at the track weekly, the crowd erupted into a near-riot as it was believed the popular driver had been robbed of a win in his Grand National debut. Soda bottles were thrown onto the track before Earnhardt addressed the crowd by microphone and declared he was satisfied with the scoring explanation.

As a result of his performance at Hickory, Earnhardt received an offer from the Holman-Moody Ford factory-backed team to run on the Grand National circuit in 1957. Earnhardt turned down the offer, reportedly due to the travel involved, being away from his family, and the money he was making as a Sportsman driver.

In mid-1957, Earnhardt entered Grand National competition driving for Lee Petty Engineering, replacing the recently departed Tiny Lund. In eight starts for the team, Earnhardt's best finish was seventh at the Charlotte Fairgrounds.

Earnhardt finished second in the 1958 National Sportsman Championship standings behind Ned Jarrett.

For 1959, Earnhardt competed in NASCAR's new Limited Sportsman Division, a division created to phase out the 1930s Coupes from Sportsman racing. Earnhardt won over 60 races and claimed NASCAR's Limited Sportsman Championship.

Earnhardt was the first car builder/driver to understand and use the tire stagger. Unlike his competitors, Earnhardt was meticulously prepared and had a fleet of five race cars: two Sportsman cars for asphalt tracks, two Sportsman cars for dirt tracks, and one Modified car. He estimated that he made a $9,000 profit in 1959 (over $95,000 in 2024 money adjusted for inflation).

Earnhardt won the Hickory track championship for the fifth time in 1959, winning 22 of 24 races he entered. At the end of the season, the track informed Ralph that he would no longer able to compete there as his constant winning affected track attendance. "That was a period of my greatest success," Earnhardt recalled in 1964. "They won't let me run there anymore. They said I monopolized once and I'd monopolize it again."

In 1960, Earnhardt repeated as NASCAR's Limited Sportsman champion, and won over 50 races that season.

During the 1961 Daytona 500, Cotton Owens needed a relief driver and requested Earnhardt. Earnhardt drove the car to a fifth-place finish. This led to additional races driving for Owens throughout the 1961 Grand National season.

Earnhardt made his debut for the Cotton Owens team at the Atlanta 500 in March. He finished in third place, but believed a scoring error cost him the victory. "I thought I won, Cotton said I won, even the scorers said I won. But I didn't get the money. According to the final tabulation, Bob Burdick finished first. I guess you just can't beat an educated pencil."

At the May 6 Rebel 400 at Darlington, Earnhardt again ran well. He led six laps, but finished three laps behind the leaders. Earnhardt again believed there was a scoring error that cost him additional positions. "In the Rebel 300, I was leading and I made a fast pit stop. Well, nobody passed me and I finished eighth. We still haven't figured that one out."

Earnhardt led 75 laps in the 1961 World 600 and finished 11th. He drove a total of eight races for the Owens before leaving the team at the end of the season. In 1961, Earnhardt had his highest points finish by finishing 17th in the Grand National point standings.

Earnhardt drove an additional 33 Grand National races between 1962 and 1964 before returning to Sportsman racing full-time. In 1967, he was the reigning South Carolina state champion, and track champion at Columbia Speedway and Greenville-Pickens Speedway.

In 1969, Earnhardt left NASCAR competition and competed at the unsanctioned tracks of Metrolina and Concord. He had grown tired of driving to South Carolina to compete at tracks such as Columbia and Greenville-Pickens. Between 1969 and 1972, Earnhardt won four consecutive track championships at Metrolina and Concord. In 1972, he raced his son Dale Earnhardt at Metrolina Speedway in a race with cars from semi mod and sportsman divisions. Earnhardt won 350 NASCAR races in different series.

Health problems forced Earnhardt into a partial retirement in 1973. While he was recovering, Stick Elliott drove Earnhardt's cars and won several races. Earnhardt returned to driving in the summer and won a pair of races at Concord Speedway on June 23 and July 7.

== Death ==
Earnhardt was hospitalized in early 1973 with heart problems. Dale Earnhardt later explained, "Dad had been in the hospital with heart trouble and he was on blood thinners and pills and a special diet. But he had come home and was doing better. In fact he had even been out in the race shop."

Earnhardt died from a second heart attack on September 26, 1973, at the age of 45 in the kitchen of his house. Dale Earnhardt later said, "He had just got the house paid for and he didn't have no bills on his racing equipment. He was gonna lay back and take it easy. And then he had a heart attack... and was gone. He had worked so hard. I think the racing, all the hard work and the worry, caused the strain and the heart attack."

== In media ==
In the film 3: The Dale Earnhardt Story, Ralph Earnhardt was portrayed by J. K. Simmons.

== Legacy ==
In 1989, Earnhardt was inducted into the National Motorsports Press Association's Hall of Fame at Darlington, South Carolina. In 1997, he was inducted International Motorsports Hall of Fame at Talladega, Alabama. In 1998, Earnhardt was named one of NASCAR's 50 Greatest Drivers. In 2004, he was inducted in the Oceanside Rotary Club of Daytona Beach Stock Car Racing Hall of Fame. In 2007, he was inducted in the National Dirt Late Model Hall of Fame. In 2023, Earnhardt was named one of NASCAR's 75 Greatest Drivers.
