= L. D. Austin =

American racing driver

- Born: September 17, 1918; Greenville, North Carolina, U.S.
- Died: August 25, 1971 (aged 52)

NASCAR Cup Series career
- 169 races run over 6 years
- Best finish: 6th (1958)
- First race: 1957 Race 4 (Daytona Beach)
- Last race: 1962 Race 1 (Concord)
Wins	Top tens	Poles
0	54	0

L.D. Austin (September 17, 1918 – August 25, 1971) was an American NASCAR Grand National Series driver. He raced in the 1959 Daytona 500 and the 1960 Daytona 500. He also finished in the top-ten in the Grand National Standings from 1957–1959. He never earned a pole position, but did make a front row start. He is also one of the drivers with the most starts without a win.
