= Banjo Matthews =

NASCAR driver and owner (1932–1996)

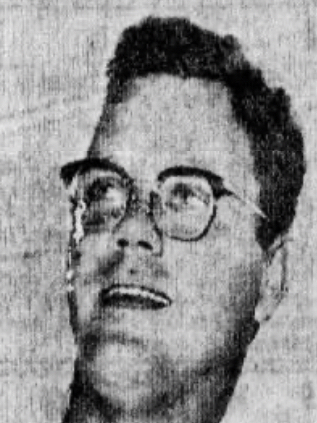
- Born: Edwin Keith Matthews; February 14, 1932; Akron, Ohio, U.S.
- Died: October 2, 1996 (aged 64); Hendersonville, North Carolina, U.S.
- Cause of death: heart and respiratory disease
- Achievements: car builder for 1976, 1977, 1978 NASCAR Cup champions
- Awards: Inducted in the International Motorsports Hall of Fame in 1998

NASCAR Cup Series career
- 51 races run over 10 years
- Best finish: 10th (1960)
- First race: 1952 Southern 500 (Darlington)
- Last race: 1963 World 600 (Charlotte)
Wins	Top tens	Poles
0	13	3

Edwin Keith "Banjo" Matthews (February 14, 1932 – October 2, 1996) was an American NASCAR driver, car owner, and builder. As a driver, he had 13 top-ten finishes in 51 starts. He was the car builder for the 1976 to 1978 NASCAR Cup Series champions.

== Racing career ==
=== Driver ===
Matthews began his career at age 15 at Pompano Beach Speedway in Florida. He was a successful Modified driver. He won 50 times in 1954. He made 51 starts in the NASCAR Grand National Series, with a best finish of second at Atlanta. He won three poles, one each at the Daytona Beach and Road Course, Daytona International Speedway, and Atlanta International Raceway.

Matthews' best finishes were on superspeedways, where he would finish in 15th place on average, while his worst finishes would be on road courses, where he would finish in 39th place on average. Matthews drove 26 races using No. 94. Matthews stopped driving in 1963 to focus on building cars.

=== Car owner/builder ===
Matthews served as car owner for several of the biggest names in NASCAR in the 1960s and 1970s, including Fireball Roberts, A. J. Foyt, Junior Johnson, Donnie Allison, and Cale Yarborough. Matthews' career as a team owner began at the 1957 Southern 500 and ended at the 1974 Southeastern 500. His drivers won 9 races and had 14 pole positions in 160 races. Matthews also served as co-crew chief for Jack Ingram in 1975, with Junior Johnson.

Matthews is best known, however, for having constructed many cars in the 1970s and 1980s, including 72% of the winning cars in the top NASCAR division from 1974 to 1985 (262 wins in 362 Cup races). He first worked for Holman Moody's Ford Motor Company factory team before starting his shop called Banjo's Performance Center in Arden, North Carolina in 1970. In 1978, he built the winning car for all 30 Cup races. He was nicknamed the "Henry Ford of Race Cars".

== Death and personal life ==
Matthews had failing health for his last two years, and he died in a nursing home in Hendersonville, North Carolina on October 2, 1996. His wife Penny had died from cancer in 1984. His son Jody took over the family business and had a daughter.

== Banjo Nickname ==
NASCAR owner Bud Moore said, "When Banjo first came around, he wore a pair of glasses that were so thick, it made everyone, on first impression, think of a 'banjo'. I don't know who thought of it first, but it stuck when we started calling him 'Banjo Eyes'."

Matthews was inducted into the International Motorsports Hall of Fame in 1998. He also received the Buddy Shuman Award for his contributions to the sport, the Smokey Yunick Award for his mechanical ability, and was inducted in the inducted National Motorsports Press Association (NMPA) Hall of Fame in 1996. In 2022, Matthews was inducted into the Motorsports Hall of Fame of America.
