= Emanuel Zervakis =

American racing driver and team owner (1930–2003)

- Born: January 23, 1930; Richmond, Virginia, U.S.
- Died: June 25, 2003 (aged 73)

NASCAR Cup Series career
- 83 races run over 7 years
- Best finish: 3rd (1961)
- First race: 1956 Race 6 (Daytona Beach)
- Last race: 1963 Southern 500 (Darlington)
- First win: 1961 Greenville 200 (Greenville-Pickens)
- Last win: 1961 Yankee 500 (Norwood)
Wins	Top tens	Poles
2	40	2

Emanuel Zervakis (January 23, 1930 – June 25, 2003) was an American NASCAR driver and team owner. He won two NASCAR Grand National Series races in his career, both in 1961 (Greenville 200 and Yankee 500). He later went on to own a part-time Cup team and a successful Busch Series team, receiving five Busch wins as an owner, four with Butch Lindley and one with Ricky Rudd.

== Career ==
=== Driver ===
Zervakis started in 83 NASCAR Cup races between 1956 and 1963 and finished in the top ten in points twice. He started his first race at Daytona Beach in 1956, finishing last in a field of 76 cars. He did not score a single top ten finish until 1960, but after that, he was in the top ten more than he was out. Zervakis was disqualified for his fuel tank being too large after winning at Wilson Speedway in 1960. He was the last winning driver to be disqualified from a race for 62 years. In 1961, he finished third in the point standings, only behind Ned Jarrett and Rex White. He ran his last race in 1963. He also made six starts in the now-defunct Convertible Series.

=== Owner ===
Zervakis was also a team owner. He might be remembered most for fielding a car for Dale Jarrett's first Winston Cup race. His Cup team competed in 39 events total, with a best finish was a second-place finish by Butch Lindley at Martinsville. He also had five wins in the Nationwide series, including Ricky Rudd's only Busch/Nationwide win in his first start, and four wins by Butch Lindley in 1982, where he finished ninth in points despite running a partial schedule.

== Racing career results ==
=== NASCAR Grand National Series ===
NASCAR Grand National Series results
Year	Team/Owner	No.	Make	1	2	3	4	5	6	7	8	9	10	11	12	13	14	15	16	17	18	19	20	21	22	23	24	25	26	27	28	29	30	31	32	33	34	35	36	37	38	39	40	41	42	43	44	45	46	47	48	49	50	51	52	53	54	55	56	NGNC	Pts	Ref.
1956	Emanuel Zervakis	113	Chevrolet						DAY 76											OCC 14		LIN 14											RAL 13																											81st	n/a	
1956	Emanuel Zervakis	11	Chevrolet																																												DAR 23												WIL 20	81st	n/a	
1957	Emanuel Zervakis	11	Chevrolet						WIL 16										RCH 22	MAR DNQ																																								n/a	n/a	
1957	Junie Donlavey	90	Ford																												RAL 24																													n/a	n/a	
1957	Junie Donlavey	90	Chevrolet																																													LAN 26				MAR 22								n/a	n/a	
1958	Junie Donlavey	90	Chevrolet													ODO 22							TRE 24								RAL 55													DAR 42								MAR 33								161st	n/a	
1958	Junie Donlavey	9	Chevrolet																																														RCH 21												n/a	
1960	Monroe Shook	85	Chevrolet			DAY 8		DAY 10					MAR 9		WIL 19						OCC 7	RCH 18		CLS 33						ATL 10			ASH 3					DAR 4					MAR 8		CLS 7		ATL 30													8th	9,720	
1960	Monroe Shook	85	Ford																DAR 8																																											
1961	Monroe Shook	85	Chevrolet				DAY 7	DAY 18		ASH 5		ATL 9	GRE 1	OCC 14	BOW 13	MAR 4	NWI 6	COL 3	HIC 17		MAR 2	DAR 13	CLS 15				CLS 15			GRE 3	BOW 4	NOR 1	HAR 16	STA 5		ATL 4	COL 6	MYR 5	BRI 7	NFA 5	BOW 4	ASH 5	RCH 3	SBO 4	DAR 5	HIC 5	RCH 6		ATL 14	MAR 7	NWI 6	CLS 7	BRI 5							3rd	22,312	
1961	Monroe Shook	85	Ford																																DAY 29																									3rd		
1962	Emanuel Zervakis	20	Mercury																		RCH 6			DAR 29		CLS 14	ATL 16			RCH 23	SBO 21								BRI 30									DAR 13		RCH 24					CLS 7	ATL 27				27th	6,406	
1963	Emanuel Zervakis	20	Mercury															RCH 24																																										54th	1,882	
1963	Emanuel Zervakis	20	Ford																										CLS 16																			DAR 41														

=== NASCAR Convertible Series ===
NASCAR Convertible Division
Year	Team/Owner	No.	Make	1	2	3	4	5	6	7	8	9	10	11	12	13	14	15	16	17	18	19	20	21	22	23	24	25	26	27	28	29	30	31	32	33	34	35	36	NCSS	Pts	Ref.
1957	Junie Donlavey	7	Chevrolet																																		NOR 6			27th	1,556	
1957	Junie Donlavey	3	Chevrolet																																			WIL 7		27th	1,556	
1958	Junie Donlavey	90	Chevrolet			RCH 17						DAR 15			MAR 31																									n/a	n/a	
1959	Junie Donlavey	90	Chevrolet			RCH 17																																		80th	64	
