= 2004 Gatorade 125s =

Qualifying races for the 2004 Daytona 500

- Date: February 12, 2004
- Location: Daytona International Speedway; Daytona Beach, Florida
- Course: Permanent racing facility 2.5 mi (4 km)
- Distance: Race 1: 50 laps, 125 mi (201.168 km); Race 2: 50 laps, 125 mi (201.168 km)
- Avg Speed: Race 1: 156.087 miles per hour (251.198 km/h); Race 2: 182.334 miles per hour (293.438 km/h)

Race 1
- Pole position: Greg Biffle
- Most laps led: Greg Biffle (22)
- Winner: Dale Earnhardt Jr.

Race 2
- Pole position: Elliott Sadler
- Most laps led: Elliott Sadler (26)
- Winner: Elliott Sadler

Television
- Network: TNT
- Announcers: Allen Bestwick, Benny Parsons, Wally Dallenbach Jr.

The 2004 Gatorade 125s were a pair of NASCAR Nextel Cup Series held on Thursday, February 12, 2004, that were the qualifying races for that year's Daytona 500, the premier event of the 2004 NASCAR Nextel Cup Series. The pair of 50-lap races was held in Daytona Beach, Florida at Daytona International Speedway, a 2.5 miles (4.0 km) permanent triangular-shaped superspeedway. The first race was won by Dale Earnhardt Jr. of Dale Earnhardt, Inc., who held off the field after passing teammate Michael Waltrip on lap 36. The second race was won by Elliott Sadler of Robert Yates Racing.

== Background ==
Daytona International Speedway, the race track where the races were held.

Daytona International Speedway is one of six superspeedways to hold NASCAR races; the others are Michigan International Speedway, Auto Club Speedway, Indianapolis Motor Speedway, Pocono Raceway and Talladega Superspeedway. Its standard track is a four-turn, 2.5-mile (4.0 km) superspeedway. Daytona's turns are banked at 31 degrees and the front stretch (the location of the finish line) is banked at 18 degrees.

In the early years, qualifying for the Daytona 500 had varying formats: from one timed lap, to the average of two laps, to the better of two laps. The idea of having two individual races to establish the starting lineup of the Daytona 500 dates back to the first race in 1959. The first of the 100-mile (160 km) qualifying races consisted of Convertible division cars and the second of Grand National cars. Between 1960 and 1967, the races were 100 miles (160 km) and were increased to 125 miles (201 km) in 1969. Prior to 1971, the races yielded points to the Drivers' Championship. Large well-established teams approach the races as practice sessions for the Daytona 500 while a successful qualification into the Daytona 500 for smaller less-established teams would allow them to enter future NASCAR events during the season. An unsuccessful qualification meant the team would risk closing down until sponsorship was found. Corporate sponsors purchased naming rights to qualifying races; between 1981 and 1984, Uno cards was the title sponsor for the "Uno Twin 125’s" qualifying events. In 1985 they became known as "7-Eleven Twin 125's"; no sponsors funded the 1988, 1989 and 1990 qualifying events and the races were called "Daytona Twin Qualifiers". Gatorade became the sponsor of the dual qualifying events in 1991 and the races were increased to 150 miles (240 km) as it became known as the "Gatorade Duels" in 2005. The races were rebranded as the "Budweiser Duels" in 2013 and became known as the "Can-Am Duels" in 2016.

The Twin 125-Mile Qualifying Races would determine positions 3 through 30. The drivers who posted the odd-number rankings in the qualifying rounds compete in the first race, which will set the inside rows—positions 3, 5, 7, etc. -- for the Daytona 500. The even-number rankings from the timed qualifying compete in the second 125-mile race and set the outside rows—positions 4, 6, 8, etc. In the event of cancellation, the top 30 positions would be set from the timed qualifying sessions. Starting positions 31 through 38 are determined by qualifying speeds set in qualifying. The 30 cars in the field are removed from the equation, and the remaining cars with the fastest official qualifying speeds fill the six positions. Starting positions 39 through 42 are provisionals assigned beginning with the car owner ranked highest in the previous Winston Cup championship points standings who did not qualify for positions 1 through 38. Starting position 43 is assigned to any car owner who has a past NASCAR Winston Cup champion driver who participated in the Winston Cup Series last season and did not otherwise qualify. The most recent past champion driver not assigned a position will receive this starting spot. If the 43rd position remains unused, it will be assigned to the next eligible owner based on last seasons final owner points standings.

=== Entry list ===
#	Driver	Team	Make
0	Ward Burton (W)	Haas CNC Racing	Chevrolet
1	John Andretti	Dale Earnhardt, Inc.	Chevrolet
01	Joe Nemechek	MBV Motorsports	Chevrolet
2	Rusty Wallace	Penske Racing	Dodge
4	Kevin Lepage	Morgan-McClure Motorsports	Chevrolet
5	Terry Labonte	Hendrick Motorsports	Chevrolet
6	Mark Martin	Roush Racing	Ford
7	Jimmy Spencer	Ultra Motorsports	Dodge
8	Dale Earnhardt Jr.	Dale Earnhardt, Inc.	Chevrolet
9	Kasey Kahne (R)	Evernham Motorsports	Dodge
09	Johnny Benson	Phoenix Racing	Dodge
10	Scott Riggs (R)	MBV Motorsports	Chevrolet
12	Ryan Newman	Penske Racing	Dodge
14	Larry Foyt (R)	A. J. Foyt Racing	Dodge
15	Michael Waltrip (W)	Dale Earnhardt, Inc.	Chevrolet
16	Greg Biffle	Roush Racing	Ford
17	Matt Kenseth	Roush Racing	Ford
18	Bobby Labonte	Joe Gibbs Racing	Chevrolet
19	Jeremy Mayfield	Evernham Motorsports	Dodge
20	Tony Stewart	Joe Gibbs Racing	Chevrolet
21	Ricky Rudd	Wood Brothers Racing	Ford
22	Scott Wimmer (R)	Bill Davis Racing	Dodge
23	Dave Blaney	Bill Davis Racing	Dodge
24	Jeff Gordon (W)	Hendrick Motorsports	Chevrolet
25	Brian Vickers (R)	Hendrick Motorsports	Chevrolet
29	Kevin Harvick	Richard Childress Racing	Chevrolet
30	Johnny Sauter (R)	Richard Childress Racing	Chevrolet
31	Robby Gordon	Richard Childress Racing	Chevrolet
32	Ricky Craven	PPI Motorsports	Chevrolet
33	Mike Skinner	Richard Childress Racing	Chevrolet
38	Elliott Sadler	Robert Yates Racing	Ford
40	Sterling Marlin (W)	Chip Ganassi Racing	Dodge
41	Casey Mears	Chip Ganassi Racing	Dodge
42	Jamie McMurray	Chip Ganassi Racing	Dodge
43	Jeff Green	Petty Enterprises	Dodge
45	Kyle Petty	Petty Enterprises	Dodge
48	Jimmie Johnson	Hendrick Motorsports	Chevrolet
49	Ken Schrader	BAM Racing	Dodge
50	Derrike Cope (W)	Arnold Motorsports	Dodge
72	Kirk Shelmerdine (R)	Kirk Shelmerdine Racing	Ford
77	Brendan Gaughan (R)	Penske-Jasper Racing	Dodge
88	Dale Jarrett (W)	Robert Yates Racing	Ford
90	Andy Hillenburg	Donlavey Racing	Ford
97	Kurt Busch	Roush Racing	Ford
99	Jeff Burton	Roush Racing	Ford
Official entry list

== Qualifying ==
Daytona 500 qualifying for positions 1-2 and the starting positions for the Duels was held on Sunday, February 8, at 12:00 PM EST.

Greg Biffle of Roush Racing would win the overall pole for the Daytona 500 and the pole for the first duel. Meanwhile, outside polesitter Elliott Sadler would get the first spot for the second duel.

=== Full qualifying results ===
Pos.	#	Driver	Team	Make	Speed	Time	Grid position in Duel
1	16	Greg Biffle	Roush Racing	Ford	188.387	47.774	1st in Duel 1
2	38	Elliott Sadler	Robert Yates Racing	Ford	188.355	47.782	1st in Duel 2
3	8	Dale Earnhardt Jr.	Dale Earnhardt, Inc.	Chevrolet	188.210	47.819	2nd in Duel 1
4	21	Ricky Rudd	Wood Brothers Racing	Ford	188.163	47.831	2nd in Duel 2
5	88	Dale Jarrett	Robert Yates Racing	Ford	187.884	47.902	3rd in Duel 1
6	4	Kevin Lepage	Morgan–McClure Motorsports	Chevrolet	187.876	47.904	3rd in Duel 2
7	9	Kasey Kahne	Evernham Motorsports	Dodge	187.766	47.932	4th in Duel 1
8	01	Joe Nemechek	MBV Motorsports	Chevrolet	187.750	47.936	4th in Duel 2
9	41	Casey Mears	Chip Ganassi Racing	Dodge	187.672	47.956	5th in Duel 1
10	29	Kevin Harvick	Richard Childress Racing	Chevrolet	187.602	47.974	5th in Duel 2
11	42	Jamie McMurray	Chip Ganassi Racing	Dodge	187.602	47.974	6th in Duel 1
12	40	Sterling Marlin	Chip Ganassi Racing	Dodge	187.477	48.006	6th in Duel 2
13	15	Michael Waltrip	Dale Earnhardt, Inc.	Chevrolet	187.274	48.058	7th in Duel 1
14	48	Jimmie Johnson	Hendrick Motorsports	Chevrolet	187.223	48.071	7th in Duel 2
15	0	Ward Burton	Haas CNC Racing	Chevrolet	187.200	48.077	8th in Duel 1
16	2	Rusty Wallace	Penske-Jasper Racing	Dodge	187.176	48.083	8th in Duel 2
17	99	Jeff Burton	Roush Racing	Ford	187.165	48.086	9th in Duel 1
18	19	Jeremy Mayfield	Evernham Motorsports	Dodge	187.095	48.104	9th in Duel 2
19	77	Brendan Gaughan	Penske-Jasper Racing	Dodge	187.071	48.110	10th in Duel 1
20	6	Mark Martin	Roush Racing	Ford	186.986	48.132	10th in Duel 2
21	1	John Andretti	Dale Earnhardt, Inc.	Chevrolet	186.939	48.144	11th in Duel 1
22	31	Robby Gordon	Richard Childress Racing	Chevrolet	186.652	48.218	11th in Duel 2
23	97	Kurt Busch	Roush Racing	Ford	186.648	48.219	12th in Duel 1
24	45	Kyle Petty	Petty Enterprises	Dodge	186.598	48.232	12th in Duel 2
25	43	Jeff Green	Petty Enterprises	Dodge	186.525	48.251	13th in Duel 1
26	25	Brian Vickers	Hendrick Motorsports	Chevrolet	186.505	48.256	13th in Duel 2
27	30	Johnny Sauter	Richard Childress Racing	Chevrolet	186.478	48.263	14th in Duel 1
28	17	Matt Kenseth	Roush Racing	Ford	186.474	48.264	14th in Duel 2
29	10	Scott Riggs	MBV Motorsports	Chevrolet	186.397	48.284	15th in Duel 1
30	49	Ken Schrader	BAM Racing	Dodge	186.274	48.316	15th in Duel 2
31	5	Terry Labonte	Hendrick Motorsports	Chevrolet	186.193	48.337	16th in Duel 1
32	32	Ricky Craven	PPI Motorsports	Chevrolet	186.127	48.354	16th in Duel 2
33	23	Dave Blaney	Bill Davis Racing	Dodge	185.981	48.392	17th in Duel 1
34	22	Scott Wimmer	Bill Davis Racing	Dodge	185.575	48.498	17th in Duel 2
35	18	Bobby Labonte	Joe Gibbs Racing	Chevrolet	185.536	48.508	18th in Duel 1
36	33	Mike Skinner	Richard Childress Racing	Chevrolet	185.456	48.529	18th in Duel 2
37	20	Tony Stewart	Joe Gibbs Racing	Chevrolet	185.219	48.591	19th in Duel 1
38	7	Jimmy Spencer	Ultra Motorsports	Dodge	184.911	48.672	19th in Duel 2
39	24	Jeff Gordon	Hendrick Motorsports	Chevrolet	184.721	48.722	20th in Duel 1
40	09	Johnny Benson Jr.	Phoenix Racing	Dodge	184.676	48.734	20th in Duel 2
41	50	Derrike Cope	Arnold Motorsports	Dodge	184.158	48.871	21st in Duel 1
42	12	Ryan Newman	Penske-Jasper Racing	Dodge	184.057	48.898	21st in Duel 2
43	14	Larry Foyt	A. J. Foyt Enterprises	Dodge	182.567	49.297	22nd in Duel 1
44	72	Kirk Shelmerdine	Kirk Shelmerdine Racing	Ford	180.523	49.855	22nd in Duel 2
45	90	Andy Hillenburg	Donlavey Racing	Ford	177.515	50.700	23rd in Duel 1
Official Duel 1 lineup
Official Duel 2 lineup

== Race results ==
Duel 1										Duel 2									
Fin.	St	#	Driver	Team	Make	Laps	Led	Status	Winnings	Fin.	St	#	Driver	Team	Make	Laps	Led	Status	Winnings
1	2	8	Dale Earnhardt Jr.	Dale Earnhardt, Inc.	Chevrolet	50	14	running	$55,612	1	1	38	Elliott Sadler	Robert Yates Racing	Ford	50	26	running	$56,689
2	19	20	Tony Stewart	Joe Gibbs Racing	Chevrolet	50	0	running	$40,612	2	6	40	Sterling Marlin	Chip Ganassi Racing	Dodge	50	1	running	$41,689
3	6	42	Jamie McMurray	Chip Ganassi Racing	Dodge	50	1	running	$35,612	3	7	48	Jimmie Johnson	Hendrick Motorsports	Chevrolet	50	0	running	$36,689
4	7	15	Michael Waltrip	Dale Earnhardt, Inc.	Chevrolet	50	12	running	$30,612	4	10	6	Mark Martin	Roush Racing	Ford	50	0	running	$31,689
5	9	99	Jeff Burton	Roush Racing	Ford	50	0	running	$28,612	5	5	29	Kevin Harvick	Richard Childress Racing	Chevrolet	50	0	running	$29,689
6	18	18	Bobby Labonte	Joe Gibbs Racing	Chevrolet	50	0	running	$26,212	6	14	17	Matt Kenseth	Roush Racing	Ford	50	0	running	$27,289
7	12	97	Kurt Busch	Roush Racing	Ford	50	0	running	$25,112	7	4	01	Joe Nemechek	MBV Motorsports	Chevrolet	50	0	running	$26,189
8	10	77	Brendan Gaughan	Penske-Jasper Racing	Dodge	50	0	running	$24,112	8	2	21	Ricky Rudd	Wood Brothers Racing	Ford	50	21	running	$25,189
9	8	0	Ward Burton	Haas CNC Racing	Chevrolet	50	0	running	$24,087	9	8	2	Rusty Wallace	Penske-Jasper Racing	Dodge	50	0	running	$25,164
10	14	30	Johnny Sauter	Richard Childress Racing	Chevrolet	50	0	running	$24,062	10	21	12	Ryan Newman	Penske-Jasper Racing	Dodge	50	0	running	$25,139
11	17	23	Dave Blaney	Bill Davis Racing	Dodge	50	0	running	$24,037	11	9	19	Jeremy Mayfield	Evernham Motorsports	Dodge	50	2	running	$25,114
12	5	41	Casey Mears	Chip Ganassi Racing	Dodge	50	0	running	$24,012	12	20	09	Johnny Benson Jr.	Phoenix Racing	Dodge	50	0	running	$25,089
13	4	9	Kasey Kahne	Evernham Motorsports	Dodge	50	0	running	$23,987	13	17	22	Scott Wimmer	Bill Davis Racing	Dodge	50	0	running	$25,064
14	1	16	Greg Biffle	Roush Racing	Ford	50	22	running	$23,962	14	16	32	Ricky Craven	PPI Motorsports	Chevrolet	50	0	running	$25,039
15	11	1	John Andretti	Dale Earnhardt, Inc.	Chevrolet	50	0	running	$23,937	15	11	31	Robby Gordon	Richard Childress Racing	Chevrolet	50	0	running	$25,014
16	21	50	Derrike Cope	Arnold Motorsports	Dodge	50	0	running	$23,912	16	18	33	Mike Skinner	Richard Childress Racing	Chevrolet	50	0	running	$24,989
17	3	88	Dale Jarrett	Robert Yates Racing	Ford	50	0	running	$23,887	17	12	45	Kyle Petty	Petty Enterprises	Dodge	50	0	running	$24,964
18	16	5	Terry Labonte	Hendrick Motorsports	Chevrolet	50	0	running	$23,837	18	15	49	Ken Schrader	BAM Racing	Dodge	50	0	running	$24,914
19	22	14	Larry Foyt	A. J. Foyt Enterprises	Dodge	50	0	running	$23,812	19	19	7	Jimmy Spencer	Ultra Motorsports	Dodge	50	0	running	$24,889
20	13	43	Jeff Green	Petty Enterprises	Dodge	50	0	running	$23,787	20	13	25	Brian Vickers	Hendrick Motorsports	Chevrolet	50	0	running	$24,864
21	20	24	Jeff Gordon	Hendrick Motorsports	Chevrolet	49	0	running	$23,762	21	22	72	Kirk Shelmerdine	Kirk Shelmerdine Racing	Ford	49	0	running	$24,839
22	23	90	Andy Hillenburg	Donlavey Racing	Ford	31	1	handling	$23,737	22	3	4	Kevin Lepage	Morgan–McClure Motorsports	Chevrolet	7	0	engine	$24,814
23	15	10	Scott Riggs	MBV Motorsports	Chevrolet	24	0	accident	$23,687										
Official Duel 1 results										Official Duel 2 results									
