= The Duel at Daytona =

Qualifying auto races to the Daytona 500

America 250 Florida Duel at Daytona

NASCAR Cup Series
- Venue: Daytona International Speedway
- Location: Daytona Beach, Florida, United States
- Corporate sponsor: Florida Commission for the United States Semiquincentennial
- First race: 1959
- Distance: 150 miles (241.401 km)
- Laps: 60
- Previous names: 100 Mile Qualifying Races (1959–1967); 125 Mile Qualifying Races (1969–1980); UNO Twin 125 Qualifiers (1981–1984); 7-Eleven Twin 125's (1985–1987); Twin 125 Qualifiers (1988–1990); Gatorade Twin 125 Qualifiers (1991–1993); Gatorade Twin 125's (1994–1996); Gatorade 125's (1997–2004); Gatorade Duel (2005–2012); Budweiser Duel (2013–2015); Can-Am Duel (2016–2018); Gander RV Duel (2019); Bluegreen Vacations Duel (2020–2024); The Duel at Daytona (2025)
- Most wins (driver): Dale Earnhardt (12)
- Most wins (team): Hendrick Motorsports (17)
- Most wins (manufacturer): Chevrolet (54)

Circuit information
- Surface: Asphalt
- Length: 2.5 mi (4.0 km)
- Turns: 4

The Duel at Daytona, formerly known as the Twin 125s and currently known as the America 250 Florida Duel at Daytona for sponsorship reasons, is a NASCAR Cup Series preliminary event to the Daytona 500 held annually in February at Daytona International Speedway. It consists of two 150-mile (240 km) races, which both serve as a qualifying race for the Daytona 500. The finishing order in the two 150-mile (240 km) races, held on the Thursday before the Daytona 500, determine the starting lineup for the Daytona 500 held on race day.

Qualifying for the Daytona 500 is unique in NASCAR. Only the two front row starters (the pole and "outside pole") are determined by the standard knockout qualifying system. For all other drivers it only determines their starting position in their Duel, with odd placed cars being entered into the first Duel and even placed cars going in the second. After the top two positions are locked in, the next 30 places of starting grid of the Daytona 500 are set by the finishing order of these two races with the top 15 (excluding pole winner and outside pole) making up the next 15 places on the inside and outside lanes respectively. After the Duels are completed the four fastest non-qualifiers by time and finally the six or seven (if no past champion's exemption is needed) highest-earning teams in points (from the previous season's standings) not in the race yet advance (also set by time), and the starting grid for the Daytona 500 would then be set. The order is still subject to change if technical regulations are violated.

== History ==
The event began as twin 100-mile (40-lap) races. From 1959 to 1971, the races were counted with points towards the Grand National championship. Purses awarded were counted separately from those awarded in the Daytona 500. For 1968, the races were scheduled for 125 miles (201 km) each, but were cancelled due to rain, and the starting lineup for the 1968 Daytona 500 fell back on the timed laps. In 1969, the races were extended again to 125 miles (50 laps). Lengthening the races added the need for a pit stop, increasing the complexity and excitement of the races.

For 1972, NASCAR's modern era commenced, so races were required to be at least 250 miles (400 km) to be included as official points events. The Daytona qualifying races continued, however, as a non-points event. ABC first aired the races in 1971 as part of Wide World of Sports highlights show. CBS took over in 1979, showing the races tape-delayed and edited the day before the Daytona 500.

With the introduction of restrictor plates in 1988, the resulting reduction in speed and fuel consumption again allowed drivers to possibly complete the race without a pit stop. Nine times from 1988 to 2004, one of the races went without a caution, and without a pit stop by the winner. In 2003, rules had been put in place requiring smaller fuel tanks on restrictor plate tracks (from 22 US gal (18 imp gal; 83 L) down to 13 US gal (11 imp gal; 49 L)), which effectively forced a pit stop once again.

Starting in 2001, the races were shown live on television, as the Daytona 500 would rotate between FOX/FX and NBC/TNT from 2001 to 2006.

In 2005, the races were lengthened to 150 miles (60-laps), given a new name, the Gatorade Duel, and from 2005 to 2012, used NASCAR's All-Exempt Tour format (similar to golf, but better known within NASCAR circles as the "top 35 rule"). The grids changed from even-odd qualifiers to a combination of even-odd based on the front row drivers by speed, then previous year's points standings (even-odd) of exempt and non-exempt teams by speed. A rain delay in 2006 saw the second race finish under the lights.

Starting in 2007, the Gatorade Duel would be shown live on Speed under the new broadcast agreement. That same year, allegations of cheating involving Michael Waltrip Racing came up.

In 2013, Budweiser, previously the sponsor of the Budweiser Shootout, switched their Speedweeks title sponsorship to the Duel races, replacing Gatorade.

During Speedweeks 2013, Daytona International Speedway announced that the qualifying races would be held in prime-time and under stadium lighting on the Thursday before the Daytona 500 beginning in 2014, the races' debut on Fox Sports 1.

From 2016 to 2018, the races were renamed the Can-Am Duel after new title sponsor BRP Inc.'s range of Can-Am All-terrain vehicles.

Beginning in 2017, the Duels became a points event once again in with the unveiling of a new race format. Under the new format still in use as of 2024 the race awards regular season points for the top ten drivers in each duel with 10 points being awarded to the winners and finishers in 2nd to 10th place earning 9 points to 1 point in increments of one point per position.

In 2026, the Duels would be known as the America 250 Florida Duel at Daytona. America 250 Florida is the campaign of the Florida Commission for the United States Semiquincentennial, a committee established by an executive order from Governor of Florida Ron DeSantis to plan events in celebration of the 250th Anniversary of the United States in the state of Florida.

== Format ==
- Busch Pole qualifying is currently held the week of the Daytona 500. Since 2021, it has been held the Wednesday of the race week. Prior to that, it was held the Sunday before (except in 2010, when qualifying was held on Saturday to avoid conflict with Super Bowl XLIV) starting from 2003, the Saturday before until 2002 (except for 1992), and the Wednesday before prior to the 1980s. Standard three-round knockout qualifying procedures are used for restrictor plate tracks. The fastest qualifier in the third round wins the pole position for the Daytona 500, and second fastest in the third round is considered the second starting position, also known as the "outside pole". Both front row starters are locked into those positions on the Daytona 500 starting grid.
- The two fastest qualifiers above (the Daytona 500 pole winner and the "outside pole" winner) are awarded the first starting position on the grid for each of the two Duel races, respectively.
- Drivers who qualify in odd-numbered positions in Q3 start in the first Duel, while those who qualify in even-numbered ones in that round start in the second Duel. This fills positions 1–6 in each Duel.
- The 12 drivers eliminated after Q2 have their Q2 times determine their starting position. The fastest driver eliminated in Q2, based on Q2 times only, starts 7th in the first Duel, while the second-fastest driver in Q2 starts in that position in the second one and based on position of elimination from Q2, they start in the first (odd) or second (even) numbered positions.
- Drivers eliminated after Q1 will have Q1 times determine their starting position. The fastest driver eliminated in Q1 starts 13th in the first Duel, while the second-fastest driver eliminated in Q1 starts in there in the second one.

=== Pre-charter format (except 2005–12) ===
- The Top 15 (14 until 2004) finishers in each Twin 125 race (excluding the two original front row qualifiers) advanced to the Daytona 500 starting lineup.
  - The Top 15 (14 until 2004) from the first race (excluding the original pole position winner) filled the inside portions of rows 2 through 16 (15 until 2004).
  - The Top 15 (14 until 2004) from the second race (excluding the original outside pole winner) filled the outside portions of rows 2 through 16 (15 until 2004).
- After both races, the remaining non-qualifiers revert to their original qualifying speeds. Until NASCAR imposed the charter system in 2016, the four fastest remaining cars were assigned positions 33–36. This format has been in place from 1998 to 2003 and 2013 to 2015. This rule was to generally protect fast qualifying cars that suffered a crash or engine failure during the heats.
  - In 2015 with knockout qualifying, a driver's qualifying speed is based on his fastest, regardless of it taking place in Q1, Q2, or Q3.
  - For 1998–2003, qualifying speeds filled positions 31–36.
  - For 1995–1997 and 2004, qualifying speeds filled positions 31–38.
  - Through 1994, qualifying speeds filled positions 31–40.
- The final starting positions (37-42) were reserved for provisionals. The highest entries in championship owner points (not driver points) from the previous season that have not yet made the field are assigned grid positions 37–42.
  - Prior to 1995, the provisional system varies, with typically two cars added.
  - From 1995 to 1997, four provisionals were used.
  - From 1998 to 2003, seven provisionals were used.
  - In 2004, five provisionals were used.
  - Provisionals are assigned by owner points from the previous season.
- Since 1990, the 43rd and final spot on the grid were tentatively reserved for the most recent NASCAR Cup champion not yet in the field. The "Champions Provisional" is used if needed, but if there are no former Cup champions in need of the slot, it reverts to a standard provisional spot. (This provisional was abolished with the charter system in 2016.)
- Since 2013, after the seven provisionals are assigned, the starting order of positions 37 through 40 is determined by fastest qualifying speeds. Under the current charter system, the rule is in effect, but only for positions 39 and 40, for open (non-chartered) cars.

=== All Exempt Tour Format/"Top 35 Rule" (2005–2012) ===
Between the 2005 and 2012 seasons, the Duel used different rules because of NASCAR's All Exempt Tour format (better known as the "top 35 rule") used at the time for the NASCAR Cup Series.

- All exempt teams (the previous season's Top 35 teams through owner points), along with the two drivers who qualified for the front row – the top two drivers from qualifying (if they are not exempt teams) are locked into the Daytona 500 starting field, regardless of finishing position in the Duel races.
- The pole position winner is given the pole for the first Duel, and the driver who qualifies second is given the pole for the second Duel; regardless of their exempt status.
- Exempt teams (excluding the pole and "outside pole" winners) are split among the two Duels based on their owner points position from the previous season. Odd-numbered points positions are entered into the first Duel and even-numbered points positions are entered into the second Duel.
  - If both teams on the front row in the Daytona 500 are even-positioned teams from the previous year's points (and would be in Duel 2), the slowest exempt team of the odd-positioned teams, based on the final points standings from the previous year, is moved to Duel 2. This was used in the 2012 Duels.
- Non-exempt entries are split between the two qualifying races. The top qualifier among non-exempt teams provided the team is not on the front row is slotted into the second race (along with even ranked non-exempt qualifiers) are split into the second race, and even ranked qualifiers are in the first race (as if they were called 36th and 37th, et al.), unless both front row starters were odd or even teams from the previous year, or if one of the two non-exempt teams makes the front row.
- After the participants are determined for the two Duels, the actual lineups for the two Duels revert to overall time trial speed rank.
- The Top 2 finishers among the non-exempt teams (excluding any that happened to qualify on the front row) from each Duel advance to the Daytona 500.
- Starting positions 3-39 are finalized by Duel finishes. Drivers from the first Duel start on the inside and drivers from the second Duel start on the outside.
  - Starting positions 3-40 (or 41) are finalized in this manner if one (or both) front row starter is a non-exempt team.
- One to four additional positions are filled by non-exempt entries by original time trial speeds.
  - If both front row starters are non-exempt teams, only one position is available. If the 43rd position is not needed, two positions are available.
  - If one front row starters is a non-exempt team, two (or three) positions are available.
  - If both front row starters are exempt teams, three (or four) positions are available. This brings the field to 42 cars.
- If there is a former NASCAR Cup Series champion driver who raced in the previous season racing for a non-exempt team and has yet to qualify, the most recent former champion not in the field yet takes the 43rd position. It is not unusual for a non-exempt team to seek out a former champion as their driver, as it provides an easier way to qualify. Otherwise, an extra position by time is available.

=== Charter-era format ===
Under the current charter system, because all chartered entries are guaranteed entry to every race of a season:

- All finishers driving for chartered teams in each Duel (excluding the two original front row qualifiers) advanced to the Daytona 500 starting lineup; the first race determines the starting position of the inside row and the second determines the outside row.
- The highest-placed "open" entry (entering the race without a charter) of each duel race will advance, based on their finishing position (for a total of two cars each). This also determines their starting position.
- Two fastest non-chartered drivers that advanced based on qualifying speeds alone will start on the last row of the Daytona 500, for a total of four non-chartered cars (NASCAR reduced the starting grid from 43 to 40 with the introduction of the system).
  - If the "open" driver that was the top unchartered entry in the duel race was also the fastest non-chartered driver in the time trials, the fastest "open" driver not locked-in that way will advance on their qualifying time alone. Otherwise, their time would be used as a fallback for them to start on the last row of the event.
- For 2025, should an Open Exemption Provisional (OEP) entry was not the top "open" driver in either time trials or their duel, they will also advance to the race as the 41st car on the grid (assuming 40 cars on the final grid). However, if the OEP entry was the fastest in either time trials or was the top finishing unchartered entry in their race, they will qualify normally as the 40th entry; no non-OEP car will enter as the 41st car in that case. Starting from 2026 Daytona 500, should the OEP entry was the fastest time trial qualifier or the top finishing open car in their duel, the second and third fastest open cars from the OEP competitor's duel will also qualify, to ensure a 41-car race.

The arrangement of the Duels under the charter system notably cost Ty Dillon a starting spot in 2021 when Ryan Preece beat him during the Duels as Dillon, despite still finishing in the top-10, did not have a fast enough qualifying time compared to his non-chartered peers.

=== Early years ===
- In the early years of the Daytona 500, the rules for the qualifying races varied widely. In 1959, the first race comprised the Convertible series, while the second comprised the Grand National series. The Top 20 finishers in each race advanced to the Daytona 500, while a last-chance, 25-mile (40 km) consolation race was held on Saturday, to fill the field to a maximum of 65 cars.
- In early years, the qualifying races were held on the Friday prior to the Daytona 500, rather than the current Thursday.
- On rare occasions, a 75-mile "consolation race" was also held.
- In some early years, pole qualifying for the Daytona 500 was held on Wednesday, the day before the qualifying races. It was eventually moved up to the weekend before, and returned to Wednesday in 2021.
- Typically, until 2014, the faster of two laps in single-car qualifying determined starting positions for the Duels and the front row for the 500.

== Notes ==
- In 2010, Jimmie Johnson and Kasey Kahne had a combined victory margin of .019 over second place drivers Kevin Harvick and Tony Stewart.
- Dale Earnhardt set a record by winning one of the Twin 125 races for ten consecutive years, twelve times overall, as well as six Bud Shootouts, before winning the 1998 Daytona 500.
- Jeff Gordon won a Twin 125 in 1993, his rookie season. It marked his first win in a NASCAR Winston Cup event, however, it did not count as an official points-paying victory. Jeff would go on to finish 5th in that year's Daytona 500. He did not win an official points race until the 1994 Coca-Cola 600 at Charlotte.
- In 2007 Jeff Gordon won the race, but failed the post race inspection. He then "earned" the lowest Daytona 500 starting spot for a race winner, starting in 42nd place, but he was still credited with the victory.
- Since the race became a non-championship heat race in 1971, two drivers who did not win a Cup race, Coo Coo Marlin and Mike Skinner, have won the race.
- Four drivers have been killed in qualifying races. Talmadge "Tab" Prince was killed in 1970, Friday Hassler in 1972, Ricky Knotts in 1980 and Bruce Jacobi in 1983 (although he was in a coma for four years before dying in 1987).
- Denny Hamlin won the second Gatorade Duel on February 14, 2008, making him the first ever Toyota driver to win a NASCAR Cup Series race.
- A driver each from Hendrick Motorsports and Joe Gibbs Racing won the Duel races from 2007 to 2009.
- Randy LaJoie suffered a horrific crash in the 1984 UNO Twin 125 event when he spun out of turn 4, got airborne and slammed hard into the wall, then performed two backflips and a barrel roll, in an identical position as Ricky Rudd's Busch Clash accident days earlier. A rash of Turn 4 incidents (including Darrell Waltrip's crash in the same area that resulted in a concussion that would have suspended him from competition immediately under current NASCAR rules during the previous year's Daytona 500) resulted in the grass apron graded and paved over for the Firecracker 400 that July.
- Oddly, despite Richard Petty's wins at Daytona in championship competition, none of his official 200 wins included a qualifying race (1959–71).
- 2000 was Bill Elliott's only win as an owner/driver.

== Past winners ==
Year	Date	No.	Driver	Team	Manufacturer	Race distance		Race time	Average speed (mph)	Report	Ref
Year	Date	No.	Driver	Team	Manufacturer	Laps	Miles (km)	Race time	Average speed (mph)	Report	Ref
1959	February 20	49	Bob Welborn		Chevrolet	40	100 (160.934)	0:41:54	143.198	Report	
1959	February 20	99	Shorty Rollins		Ford	40	100 (160.934)	0:46:26	129.218	Report	
1959	February 21	47	Jack Smith	Jack Smith	Chevrolet	10	25 (40.233)	0:10:37	141.28	Report	
1960	February 13	22	Fireball Roberts	John Hines	Pontiac	40	100 (160.934)	0:45:32	137.614	Report	
1960	February 13	47	Jack Smith	Jack Smith	Pontiac	40	100 (160.934)	0:40:57	146.52	Report	
1960	February 13	26	Curtis Turner	Holman-Moody	Ford	10	25 (40.233)	0:18:22	144.694	Report	
1961	February 24	22	Fireball Roberts	Smokey Yunick	Pontiac	39*	97.5 (156.911)	0:45:06	129.711	Report	
1961	February 24	8	Joe Weatherly	Bud Moore Engineering	Pontiac	40	100 (160.934)	0:39:16	152.671	Report	
1961	February 24	27	Junior Johnson		Pontiac	10	25 (40.233)	0:10:04	149.006	Report	
1962	February 16	22	Fireball Roberts	Jim Stephens	Pontiac	40	100 (160.934)	0:38:13	156.999	Report	
1962	February 16	8	Joe Weatherly	Bud Moore Engineering	Pontiac	40	100 (160.934)	0:41:16	145.395	Report	
1962	February 16	72	Bobby Johns		Pontiac	10	25 (40.233)	0:09:53	151.556	Report	
1963	February 22	3	Junior Johnson	Ray Fox	Chevrolet	40	100 (160.934)	0:36:34	164.083	Report	
1963	February 22	13	Johnny Rutherford	Smokey Yunick	Chevrolet	40	100 (160.934)	0:36:49	162.969	Report	
1963	February 23	71	Bubba Farr	W. M. Harrison	Chevrolet	20	50 (80.467)			Report	
1964	February 21	3	Junior Johnson	Ray Fox	Dodge	40	100 (160.934)	0:35:08	170.777	Report	
1964	February 21	26	Bobby Isaac	Ray Nichels	Dodge	40	100 (160.934)	0:35:20	169.811	Report	
1965	February 12	16	Darel Dieringer	Bud Moore Engineering	Mercury	40	100 (160.934)	0:36:13	165.669	Report	
1965	February 12	27	Junior Johnson	Junior Johnson & Associates	Ford	40	100 (160.934)	0:54:01	111.076	Report	
1966	February 25	99	Paul Goldsmith	Ray Nichels	Plymouth	40	100 (160.934)	0:37:24	160.427	Report	
1966	February 25	3	Earl Balmer	Ray Fox	Dodge	40	100 (160.934)	0:39:01	153.191	Report	
1967	February 24	12	LeeRoy Yarbrough	Jon Thorne	Dodge	40	100 (160.934)	0:36:36	163.934	Report	
1967	February 24	28	Fred Lorenzen	Holman-Moody	Ford	40	100 (160.934)	0:34:22	174.587	Report	
1968	February 22	Races cancelled because of rain.									
1969	February 20	17	David Pearson	Holman-Moody	Ford	50	125 (201.168)	0:49:16	152.181	Report	
1969	February 20	71	Bobby Isaac	Nord Krauskopf	Dodge	50	125 (201.168)	0:49:27	151.688	Report	
1970	February 19	21	Cale Yarborough	Wood Brothers Racing	Mercury	50	125 (201.168)	0:40:48	183.295	Report	
1970	February 19	99	Charlie Glotzbach	Ray Nichels	Dodge	50	125 (201.168)	0:50:46	147.734	Report	
1971	February 11	6	Pete Hamilton	Cotton Owens	Plymouth	50	125 (201.168)	0:42:51	175.029	Report	
1971	February 11	17	David Pearson	Holman-Moody	Mercury	50	125 (201.168)	0:44:27	168.728	Report	
1972	February 17	71	Bobby Isaac	Nord Krauskopf	Dodge	50	125 (201.168)	0:59:00	127.118	Report	
1972	February 17	12	Bobby Allison	Richard Howard	Chevrolet	50	125 (201.168)	0:48:45	178.217	Report	
1973	February 15	71	Buddy Baker	Nord Krauskopf	Dodge	50	125 (201.168)	0:43:12	173.611	Report	
1973	February 15	14	Coo Coo Marlin	H. B. Cunningham	Chevrolet	50	125 (201.168)	0:47:43	157.177	Report	
1974	February 14	27	Bobby Isaac	Banjo Matthews	Chevrolet	45*	112.5 (181.051)	0:54:27	123.212	Report	
1974	February 14	11	Cale Yarborough	Richard Howard	Chevrolet	45*	112.5 (181.051)	0:52:03	129.724	Report	
1975	February 13	16	Bobby Allison	Penske Racing	Matador	50	125 (201.168)	0:47:52	156.685	Report	
1975	February 13	21	David Pearson	Wood Brothers Racing	Mercury	50	125 (201.168)	0:47:47	156.958	Report	
1976	February 12	71	Dave Marcis	Nord Krauskopf	Dodge	50	125 (201.168)	1:02:47	119.458	Report	
1976	February 12	88	Darrell Waltrip	DiGard Motorsports	Chevrolet	50	125 (201.168)	0:48:00	156.25	Report	
1977	February 17	43	Richard Petty	Petty Enterprises	Dodge	50	125 (201.168)	0:41:42	179.856	Report	
1977	February 17	11	Cale Yarborough	Junior Johnson & Associates	Chevrolet	50	125 (201.168)	0:43:45	171.429	Report	
1978	February 16	51	A. J. Foyt	A. J. Foyt	Buick	50	125 (201.168)	1:00:58	123.018	Report	
1978	February 16	88	Darrell Waltrip	DiGard Motorsports	Chevrolet	50	125 (201.168)	0:44:12	169.683	Report	
1979	February 15	28	Buddy Baker	Ranier Racing with MDM	Oldsmobile	50	125 (201.168)	0:44:45	167.598	Report	
1979	February 15	88	Darrell Waltrip	DiGard Motorsports	Oldsmobile	50	125 (201.168)	0:49:01	153.009	Report	
1980	February 14	21	Neil Bonnett	Wood Brothers Racing	Mercury	50	125 (201.168)	0:54:15	138.25	Report	
1980	February 14	1	Donnie Allison	Hoss Ellington	Oldsmobile	50	125 (201.168)	0:45:20	165.441	Report	
1981	February 12	28	Bobby Allison	Ranier Racing with MDM	Pontiac	50	125 (201.168)	0:49:36	150.125	Report	
1981	February 12	11	Darrell Waltrip	Junior Johnson & Associates	Buick	50	125 (201.168)	0:49:03	152.905	Report	
1981	February 13	66	Lake Speed	Speed Racing	Oldsmobile	30	75 (120.7)	0:31:12	144.231	Report	
1982	February 11	27	Cale Yarborough	M. C. Anderson	Buick	50	125 (201.168)	0:55:26	135.298	Report	
1982	February 11	1	Buddy Baker	Hoss Ellington	Buick	50	125 (201.168)	0:51:54	144.509	Report	
1982	February 12	29	Tim Richmond	Billie Harvey	Ford	30	75 (120.7)	0:31:17	143.847	Report	
1983	February 17	15	Dale Earnhardt	Bud Moore Engineering	Ford	50	125 (201.168)	0:48:28	157.746	Report	
1983	February 17	75	Neil Bonnett	RahMoc Enterprises	Chevrolet	50	125 (201.168)	1:01:23	122.183	Report	
1983	February 18	39	Blackie Wangerin	Wangerin Racing	Ford	30	75 (120.7)	0:31:57	140.845	Report	
1984	February 16	28	Cale Yarborough	Ranier Racing with MDM	Chevrolet	50	125 (201.168)	0:57:56	129.459	Report	
1984	February 16	22	Bobby Allison	DiGard Motorsports	Buick	50	125 (201.168)	0:53:44	139.578	Report	
1984	February 17	37	Connie Saylor	Lain Racing	Pontiac	30	75 (120.7)	0:35:22	127.238	Report	
1985	February 14	9	Bill Elliott	Melling Racing	Ford	50	125 (201.168)	0:41:43	179.784	Report	
1985	February 14	28	Cale Yarborough	Ranier Racing with MDM	Ford	50	125 (201.168)	0:48:16	155.387	Report	
1985	February 15	07	Randy LaJoie	Snellman Brothers	Chevrolet	30	75 (120.7)	0:23:46	189.341	Report	
1986	February 13	9	Bill Elliott	Melling Racing	Ford	50	125 (201.168)	0:48:49	153.636	Report	
1986	February 13	3	Dale Earnhardt	Richard Childress Racing	Chevrolet	50	125 (201.168)	0:48:56	153.27	Report	
1987	February 12	90	Ken Schrader	Donlavey Racing	Ford	50	125 (201.168)	0:57:31	130.397	Report	
1987	February 12	35	Benny Parsons	Hendrick Motorsports	Chevrolet	50	125 (201.168)	0:41:02	182.778	Report	
1988	February 11	12	Bobby Allison	Stavola Brothers Racing	Buick	50	125 (201.168)	0:57:16	130.966	Report	
1988	February 11	17	Darrell Waltrip	Hendrick Motorsports	Chevrolet	50	125 (201.168)	0:56:01	133.889	Report	
1989	February 16	25	Ken Schrader	Hendrick Motorsports	Chevrolet	50	125 (201.168)	0:50:57	147.203	Report	
1989	February 16	11	Terry Labonte	Junior Johnson & Associates	Ford	50	125 (201.168)	0:39:34	189.554	Report	
1990	February 15	11	Geoff Bodine	Junior Johnson & Associates	Ford	50	125 (201.168)	0:40:05	187.11	Report	
1990	February 15	3	Dale Earnhardt	Richard Childress Racing	Chevrolet	50	125 (201.168)	0:47:42	157.123	Report	
1991	February 14	28	Davey Allison	Robert Yates Racing	Ford	50	125 (201.168)	0:45:21	165.38	Report	
1991	February 14	3	Dale Earnhardt	Richard Childress Racing	Chevrolet	50	125 (201.168)	0:47:50	156.794	Report	
1992	February 13	3	Dale Earnhardt	Richard Childress Racing	Chevrolet	50	125 (201.168)	1:04:25	116.43	Report	
1992	February 13	11	Bill Elliott	Junior Johnson & Associates	Ford	50	125 (201.168)	0:44:10	169.811	Report	
1993	February 11	24	Jeff Gordon	Hendrick Motorsports	Chevrolet	50	125 (201.168)	0:48:56	153.27	Report	
1993	February 11	3	Dale Earnhardt	Richard Childress Racing	Chevrolet	50	125 (201.168)	0:47:41	157.288	Report	
1994	February 17	28	Ernie Irvan	Robert Yates Racing	Ford	50	125 (201.168)	0:47:59	156.304	Report	
1994	February 17	3	Dale Earnhardt	Richard Childress Racing	Chevrolet	50	125 (201.168)	0:51:06	146.771	Report	
1995	February 16	4	Sterling Marlin	Morgan–McClure Motorsports	Chevrolet	50	125 (201.168)	0:49:59	150.05	Report	
1995	February 16	3	Dale Earnhardt	Richard Childress Racing	Chevrolet	50	125 (201.168)	0:56:52	131.887	Report	
1996	February 15	3	Dale Earnhardt	Richard Childress Racing	Chevrolet	50	125 (201.168)	0:52:26	143.039	Report	
1996	February 15	28	Ernie Irvan	Robert Yates Racing	Ford	50	125 (201.168)	0:40:19	186.027	Report	
1997	February 13	88	Dale Jarrett	Robert Yates Racing	Ford	50	125 (201.168)	0:45:09	166.113	Report	
1997	February 13	3	Dale Earnhardt	Richard Childress Racing	Chevrolet	50	125 (201.168)	0:46:05	162.749	Report	
1998	February 12	40	Sterling Marlin	SABCO Racing	Chevrolet	50	125 (201.168)	0:53:36	139.925	Report	
1998	February 12	3	Dale Earnhardt	Richard Childress Racing	Chevrolet	50	125 (201.168)	0:50:57	147.203	Report	
1999	February 11	18	Bobby Labonte	Joe Gibbs Racing	Pontiac	50	125 (201.168)	0:45:52	163.57	Report	
1999	February 11	3	Dale Earnhardt	Richard Childress Racing	Chevrolet	50	125 (201.168)	0:48:16	155.28	Report	
2000	February 17	94	Bill Elliott	Bill Elliott Racing	Ford	50	125 (201.168)	0:39:44	188.758	Report	
2000	February 17	28	Ricky Rudd	Robert Yates Racing	Ford	50	125 (201.168)	0:39:53	188.048	Report	
2001	February 15	40	Sterling Marlin	Chip Ganassi Racing	Dodge	50	125 (201.168)	0:50:51	147.493	Report	
2001	February 15	31	Mike Skinner	Richard Childress Racing	Chevrolet	50	125 (201.168)	0:46:12	162.338	Report	
2002	February 14	24	Jeff Gordon	Hendrick Motorsports	Chevrolet	50	125 (201.168)	0:40:50	183.674	Report	
2002	February 14	15	Michael Waltrip	Dale Earnhardt, Inc.	Chevrolet	50	125 (201.168)	0:56:50	131.965	Report	
2003	February 13	31	Robby Gordon	Richard Childress Racing	Chevrolet	50	125 (201.168)	0:41:24	181.14	Report	
2003	February 13	8	Dale Earnhardt Jr.	Dale Earnhardt, Inc.	Chevrolet	50	125 (201.168)	0:41:28	180.845	Report	
2004	February 12	8	Dale Earnhardt Jr.	Dale Earnhardt, Inc.	Chevrolet	50	125 (201.168)	0:48:03	156.087	Report	
2004	February 12	38	Elliott Sadler	Robert Yates Racing	Ford	50	125 (201.168)	0:41:08	182.334	Report	
2005	February 17	15	Michael Waltrip	Dale Earnhardt, Inc.	Chevrolet	60	150 (241.401)	1:04:05	140.422	Report	
2005	February 17	20	Tony Stewart	Joe Gibbs Racing	Chevrolet	60	150 (241.401)	1:00:02	145.161	Report	
2006	February 16	38	Elliott Sadler	Robert Yates Racing	Ford	64*	160 (257.495)	1:08:16	140.625	Report	
2006	February 16	24	Jeff Gordon	Hendrick Motorsports	Chevrolet	64*	160 (257.495)	1:05:32	146.49	Report	
2007	February 15	20	Tony Stewart	Joe Gibbs Racing	Chevrolet	63*	157.5 (253.471)	1:23:16	113.491	Report	
2007	February 15	24	Jeff Gordon	Hendrick Motorsports	Chevrolet	60	150 (241.401)	0:58:05	154.95	Report	
2008	February 14	88	Dale Earnhardt Jr.	Hendrick Motorsports	Chevrolet	60	150 (241.401)	0:59:00	160.81	Report	
2008	February 14	11	Denny Hamlin	Joe Gibbs Racing	Toyota	64*	160 (257.495)	1:14:45	128.428	Report	
2009	February 12	24	Jeff Gordon	Hendrick Motorsports	Chevrolet	60	150 (241.401)	1:04:32	139.436	Report	
2009	February 12	18	Kyle Busch	Joe Gibbs Racing	Toyota	60	150 (241.401)	0:57:14	157.251	Report	
2010	February 11	48	Jimmie Johnson	Hendrick Motorsports	Chevrolet	60	150 (241.401)	1:01:27	146.461	Report	
2010	February 11	9	Kasey Kahne	Richard Petty Motorsports	Ford	60	150 (241.401)	0:51:32	174.644	Report	
2011	February 17	22	Kurt Busch	Penske Racing	Dodge	62*	155 (249.448)	0:58:12	159.794	Report	
2011	February 17	31	Jeff Burton	Richard Childress Racing	Chevrolet	60	150 (241.401)	1:05:54	136.571	Report	
2012	February 23	14	Tony Stewart	Stewart–Haas Racing	Chevrolet	60	150 (241.401)	0:56:34	159.104	Report	
2012	February 23	17	Matt Kenseth	Roush Fenway Racing	Ford	60	150 (241.401)	0:46:23	194.175	Report	
2013	February 21	29	Kevin Harvick	Richard Childress Racing	Chevrolet	60	150 (241.401)	0:50:46	177.282	Report	
2013	February 21	18	Kyle Busch	Joe Gibbs Racing	Toyota	60	150 (241.401)	0:46:24	193.966	Report	
2014	February 20	20	Matt Kenseth	Joe Gibbs Racing	Toyota	60	150 (241.401)	0:46:49	192.259	Report	
2014	February 20	11	Denny Hamlin	Joe Gibbs Racing	Toyota	60	150 (241.401)	1:02:43	140.651	Report	
2015	February 19	88	Dale Earnhardt Jr.	Hendrick Motorsports	Chevrolet	60	150 (241.401)	1:02:18	144.462	Report	
2015	February 19	48	Jimmie Johnson	Hendrick Motorsports	Chevrolet	64*	160 (257.495)	1:06:20	144.724	Report	
2016	February 18	88	Dale Earnhardt Jr.	Hendrick Motorsports	Chevrolet	60	150 (251.401)	0:52:06	172.899	Report	
2016	February 18	18	Kyle Busch	Joe Gibbs Racing	Toyota	60	150 (251.401)	0:46:54	191.898	Report	
2017	February 23	24	Chase Elliott	Hendrick Motorsports	Chevrolet	60	150 (251.401)	0:56:13	160.095	Report	
2017	February 23	11	Denny Hamlin	Joe Gibbs Racing	Toyota	60	150 (251.401)	0:57:20	156.977	Report	
2018	February 15	12	Ryan Blaney	Team Penske	Ford	63*	157.5 (253.471)	1:08:25	138.124	Report	
2018	February 15	9	Chase Elliott	Hendrick Motorsports	Chevrolet	60	150 (251.401)	0:49:29	181.879	Report	
2019	February 14	4	Kevin Harvick	Stewart–Haas Racing	Ford	60	150 (251.401)	0:50:38	177.749	Report	
2019	February 14	22	Joey Logano	Team Penske	Ford	60	150 (251.401)	0:46:36	193.133	Report	
2020	February 13	22	Joey Logano	Team Penske	Ford	60	150 (251.401)	0:54:09	166.105	Report	
2020	February 13	24	William Byron	Hendrick Motorsports	Chevrolet	60	150 (251.401)	0:52:38	170.994	Report	
2021	February 11	10	Aric Almirola	Stewart–Haas Racing	Ford	60	150 (251.401)	0:46:53	191.966	Report	
2021	February 11	3	Austin Dillon	Richard Childress Racing	Chevrolet	63*	157.5 (253.471)	0:59:47	158.071	Report	
2022	February 17	6	Brad Keselowski	RFK Racing	Ford	60	150 (251.401)	0:48:36	185.185	Report	
2022	February 17	17	Chris Buescher	RFK Racing	Ford	60	150 (251.401)	0:48:24	185.98	Report	
2023	February 16	22	Joey Logano	Team Penske	Ford	60	150 (251.401)	0:47:55	187.63	Report	
2023	February 16	10	Aric Almirola	Stewart–Haas Racing	Ford	60	150 (251.401)	0:59:15	151.813	Report	
2024	February 15	45	Tyler Reddick	23XI Racing	Toyota	60	150 (251.401)	0:53:35	167.963	Report	
2024	February 15	20	Christopher Bell	Joe Gibbs Racing	Toyota	60	150 (251.401)	0:55:51	161.146	Report	
2025	February 13	23	Bubba Wallace	23XI Racing	Toyota	60	150 (251.401)	1:08:45	130.909	Report	
2025	February 13	2	Austin Cindric	Team Penske	Ford	60	150 (251.401)	0:55:41	161.628	Report	
2026	February 12	22	Joey Logano	Team Penske	Ford	63*	157.5 (253.471)	1:01:25	153.867	Report	
2026	February 12	9	Chase Elliott	Hendrick Motorsports	Chevrolet	60	150 (251.401)	0:49:07	183.237	Report	

=== Race notes ===
- 1961: First race was shortened due to crash.
- 1974: Both races were shortened due to energy crisis (10% shorter).
- 2006: Both races were extended due to a green–white–checkered finish.
- 2007, 2011, 2018 and 2026: First race was extended due to a NASCAR overtime.
- 2008, 2015 and 2021: Second race was extended due to a NASCAR overtime.
- 2017: Was the first time that points were on the line in Modern era (1972–present).
- 2021: Second race was delayed 3 hours for rain, finished early Friday morning.
- 2025: Erik Jones crossed the second duel's finish line first, but due to a very late caution being called just before he passed Cindric, the latter was ruled to be the winner as he was determined to be the leader at the time of caution.
- 2026: Nathan crashed into a barrier.

=== Multiple winners (drivers) ===
Wins	Driver	Years won
12	Dale Earnhardt	1983, 1986, 1990–1999
6	Cale Yarborough	1970, 1974, 1977, 1982, 1984, 1985
5	Bobby Allison	1972, 1975, 1981, 1984, 1988
5	Darrell Waltrip	1976, 1978, 1979, 1981, 1988
5	Jeff Gordon	1993, 2002, 2006–2007, 2009
5	Dale Earnhardt Jr.	2003, 2004, 2008, 2015, 2016
4	Junior Johnson	1961, 1963–1965
4	Bobby Isaac	1964, 1969, 1972, 1974
4	Bill Elliott	1985, 1986, 1992, 2000
4	Joey Logano	2019, 2020, 2023, 2026
3	Fireball Roberts	1960–1962
3	David Pearson	1969, 1971, 1975
3	Buddy Baker	1973, 1979, 1982
3	Sterling Marlin	1995, 1998, 2001
3	Tony Stewart	2005, 2007, 2012
3	Kyle Busch	2009, 2013, 2016
3	Denny Hamlin	2008, 2014, 2017
3	Chase Elliott	2017, 2018, 2026
2	Jack Smith	1959, 1960
2	Joe Weatherly	1961, 1962
2	Neil Bonnett	1980, 1983
2	Ken Schrader	1987, 1989
2	Ernie Irvan	1994, 1996
2	Michael Waltrip	2002, 2005
2	Elliott Sadler	2004, 2006
2	Matt Kenseth	2012, 2014
2	Jimmie Johnson	2010, 2015
2	Kevin Harvick	2013, 2019
2	Aric Almirola	2021, 2023

=== Multiple winners (teams) ===
Wins	Team	Years won
17	Hendrick Motorsports	1987–1989, 1993, 2002, 2006–2010, 2015^{1&2}–2018, 2020, 2026
16	Richard Childress Racing	1986, 1990–1999, 2001, 2003, 2011, 2013, 2021
11	Joe Gibbs Racing	1999, 2005, 2007–2009, 2013, 2014^{1&2}, 2016, 2017, 2024
9	Team Penske	1975, 2011, 2018–2020, 2022, 2023, 2025, 2026
7	Robert Yates Racing	1991, 1994, 1996, 1997, 2000, 2004, 2006
6	Junior Johnson & Associates	1965, 1977, 1981, 1989, 1990, 1992
4	Holman-Moody	1960, 1967, 1969, 1971
4	Bud Moore Engineering	1961, 1962, 1965, 1983
4	Nord Krauskopf	1969, 1972, 1973, 1976
4	DiGard Motorsports	1976, 1978, 1979, 1984
4	Ranier Racing with MDM	1979, 1981, 1984, 1985
4	Dale Earnhardt, Inc.	2002–2005
4	Stewart–Haas Racing	2012, 2019, 2021, 2023
3	Ray Fox	1963, 1964, 1966
3	Ray Nichels	1964, 1966, 1970
3	Wood Brothers Racing	1970, 1975, 1980
3	RFK Racing	2012, 2022^{1&2}
2	Jack Smith	1961, 1963
2	Smokey Yunick	1959, 1960
2	Richard Howard	1972, 1974
2	Hoss Ellington	1980, 1982
2	Melling Racing	1985, 1986
2	23XI Racing	2024, 2025

=== Manufacturer wins ===
==== Race 1 ====
Manufacturer	Wins
Chevrolet	23
Ford	19
Dodge	7
Pontiac	5
Mercury	3
Buick	3
Toyota	3
Plymouth	2
AMC	1
Oldsmobile	1

==== Race 2 ====
Manufacturer	Wins
Chevrolet	31
Ford	15
Toyota	7
Dodge	4
Pontiac	3
Buick	3
Mercury	2
Oldsmobile	2

==== Overall ====
Manufacturer	Wins
Chevrolet	54
Ford	34
Dodge	11
Toyota	10
Pontiac	8
Buick	6
Mercury	5
Oldsmobile	3
Plymouth	2
AMC	1
