= 2007 Gatorade Duels =

The 2007 Gatorade Duels were a pair of NASCAR Nextel Cup Series stock car races that were held on February 15, 2007, at Daytona International Speedway in Daytona Beach, Florida, United States. Both, contested over 60 laps, were the qualifying races for the 2007 Daytona 500. The first race was won by Tony Stewart of Joe Gibbs Racing and the second race was won by Jeff Gordon of Hendrick Motorsports.

The races set the field for the 49th running of "The Great American Race". These races are the only ones in the NASCAR Nextel Cup that qualifies drivers and their teams for a points-paying race. As qualifying only sets the front row for the Daytona 500, these races are formatted as follows:

- The pole sitter for the Daytona 500 (David Gilliland) was on the point for the first race, with odd-numbered racers who have times in the first event, with the third-fastest driver sitting next to the pole sitter on the front row, then fifth- and seventh-fastest drivers in the second row, and so on.
- The second-fastest overall driver (Ricky Rudd) was the pole sitter for race two, with the fourth-fastest driver alongside in the front row, then the sixth- and eighth-fastest cars in row two, and so forth.

Positions three through 39 were filled that way (not counting the pole drivers in each race) along with the top drivers in each race not locked in from the previous season's Top 35, automatically qualify for the race. After that, the three fastest cars that did not qualify in the races along with a past champions provisional (if needed) completes the 43-car field. Had all past champions made the race, the next fastest car would have been entered into the field.

== Top ten finishers ==
=== Race 1 and 2 ===
Top Ten Finishers
Race 1					Race 2				
Pos.	No.	Driver	Car Make	Team	Pos.	No.	Driver	Car Make	Team
1	20	Tony Stewart	Chevrolet	Joe Gibbs Racing	1	24	Jeff Gordon	Chevrolet	Hendrick Motorsports
2	8	Dale Earnhardt Jr.	Chevrolet	Dale Earnhardt, Inc.	2	2	Kurt Busch	Dodge	Penske Racing
3	31	Jeff Burton	Chevrolet	Richard Childress Racing	3	40	David Stremme	Dodge	Chip Ganassi Racing
4	38	David Gilliland	Ford	Robert Yates Racing	4	5	Kyle Busch	Chevrolet	Hendrick Motorsports
5	11	Denny Hamlin	Chevrolet	Joe Gibbs Racing	5	17	Matt Kenseth	Ford	Roush Fenway Racing
6	07	Clint Bowyer	Chevrolet	Richard Childress Racing	6	18	J. J. Yeley	Chevrolet	Joe Gibbs Racing
7	1	Martin Truex Jr.	Chevrolet	Dale Earnhardt, Inc.	7	99	Carl Edwards	Ford	Roush Fenway Racing
8	55	Michael Waltrip	Toyota	Michael Waltrip Racing	8	12	Ryan Newman	Dodge	Penske Racing
9	25	Casey Mears	Chevrolet	Hendrick Motorsports	9	13	Joe Nemechek	Chevrolet	Ginn Racing
10	21	Ken Schrader	Ford	Wood Brothers Racing	10	96	Tony Raines	Chevrolet	Hall of Fame Racing

Failed to qualify for the Daytona 500
Race 1	Race 2
49-Mike Bliss	15-Paul Menard
36-Jeremy Mayfield	34-Kevin Lepage
78-Kenny Wallace	74-Derrike Cope
30-Stanton Barrett	39-Regan Smith
37-Bill Elliott	71-Frank Kimmel
72-Brandon Whitt	04-Eric McClure
58-James Hylton	27-Kirk Shelmerdine
4-Ward Burton	83-Brian Vickers
84-A. J. Allmendinger	23-Mike Skinner

== Penalties ==
During the 2007 NASCAR Gatorade Duels, the qualifying events for the Daytona 500, various incidents and cheating allegations surrounding the events occurred, leading to various sanctions for teams and drivers.

=== Pole qualifying infractions ===
Prior to qualifying, Evernham Motorsports team directors (equivalent of crew chief) Rodney Childers (#10 Dodge Charger) and Josh Browne (#19 Charger) were suspended for Daytona and the following week's race at Fontana, fined $25,000 (US), plus both their teams and drivers (Scott Riggs for the #10, Elliott Sadler for the #19) were penalized 25 championship points due to an illegal modification that was corrected before qualifying in pre-qualifying inspection.

After the qualifying had ended, NASCAR handed out heavier penalties for crew chiefs Kenny Francis (Evernham Motorsports #9 Charger) and Robbie Reiser (Roush Fenway Racing #17 Ford Fusion) teams. Both were suspended for Daytona and the next three races, fined $50,000, and their teams and drivers (Kasey Kahne for the #9 and Matt Kenseth for the #17) were penalized 50 championship points due to illegal modifications found in post-qualifying inspection. In addition, due to the modifications, their qualifying times were disallowed. (Kenseth had the 11th-fastest time in the opening round, while Kahne was 28th.) The penalty to the #10 team would drop it out of the top-35 in owners points.

=== Michael Waltrip Racing ===
On February 14, three days after the first round of qualifying, David Hyder, the crew chief for Michael Waltrip and Bobby Kennedy, competition director for Michael Waltrip Racing (MWR) (cars #44 and #55) and Waltrip-PPI Racing (#00) were ejected from the track by NASCAR officials. Earlier, the intake manifold from Waltrip's #55 car had been confiscated by NASCAR when "an unknown substance" was found in it during post-qualifying inspection. When a new manifold was installed and the engine test-run, the same substance was found in the new manifold, resulting in NASCAR impounding the entire car and disallowing Waltrip's qualifying time, which was 25th-fastest. Just before 6 p.m. US EST, NASCAR held a press conference at which it was announced that both Hyder and Kennedy were suspended indefinitely, Hyder fined $100,000, Waltrip docked 100 championship points, and the team, owned by Waltrip's wife, Buffy, were docked 100 car owner points for violations that included a violation of the rule (in place through the 2010 season) prohibiting the blending of gasoline with "alcohols, ethers, or other oxygenates"; this quickly became known among the media and fans as "rocket fuel". Waltrip was permitted to compete in the first Gatorade Duel qualifying race in a backup car. He finished eighth, which was high enough to qualify the car for the Daytona 500.

As a result of the penalty, Waltrip became only the second driver to ever have a negative score in the championship standings. He finished Daytona with -27 points, as his 30th-place showing, worth 73 points, did not compensate for the 100-point penalty. This remained his score until June 4, when he finally made his second start of the year at Dover International Speedway in the Cup series' 14th race. Meanwhile, Kennedy was given a 6-month leave of absence by MWR. He was relieved of duty later that year but rehired by MWR in March 2008. Because somebody had to be fired according to the MWR rules for the near-fatal scandal for the team, David Hyder was ultimately held responsible and relieved of duty. Neither NASCAR nor MWR has specified what substance was found in Waltrip's engine.

=== Duel Race #2 ===
In a post-race inspection following the second Gatorade Duel qualifying race, race winner Jeff Gordon, driver of the Hendrick Motorsports #24 Chevrolet Monte Carlo SS had been found to be one inch too low because of misaligned bolts on a shock absorber. Due to the official's belief that the violation was unintentional, he kept the win, but would be penalized by starting 42nd in the Daytona 500.

== Aftermath ==
The race, the first of the season, was won by Kevin Harvick. The penalties resulted in the following point readjustments:

- Sadler: Finished 6th in the race, was dropped to 11th in points, 65 points behind Harvick.
- Kahne: Finished 7th, was tied for 23rd, 94 points behind.
- Kenseth: Finished 27th, was tied for 40th, 157 points behind.
- Riggs: Finished 37th, was 42nd, 163 points behind.
- Waltrip: Finished 30th, was 43rd, 217 points behind, becoming the first driver in NASCAR history to begin a season with a negative point total, at -27 points, and second of three drivers to carry a negative point total for a race (in 2000 Jeremy Mayfield carried -26 points following the DieHard 500, in 2009 Carl Long carried -200 points following the Coca-Cola 600 weekend).

On March 6, appeals for Kenseth by Roush Fenway Racing and Kahne by Evernham Motorsports were denied by the three-member panel that oversees NASCAR's disciplinary action. Before that, Kenseth had been able to climb to 12th in the standings after winning the Auto Club 500 with interim crew chief Chip Bolin.
