= 2007 Daytona 500 =

2007 stock car race in Daytona Beach, Florida

Race details
- Race 1 of 36 in the 2007 NASCAR Nextel Cup Series
- 2007 Daytona 500 logo
- Date: February 18, 2007
- Official name: 49th Annual Daytona 500
- Location: Daytona International Speedway; Daytona Beach, Florida, United States
- Course: Permanent racing facility 2.500 mi (4.023 km)
- Distance: 202 laps, 505.000 mi (812.718 km)
- Scheduled distance: 200 laps, 500.000 mi (804.672 km)
- Weather: Cold with temperatures approaching 55.9 °F (13.3 °C); wind speeds up to 15.90 miles per hour (25.59 km/h)
- Average speed: 149.333 miles per hour (240.328 km/h)
- Attendance: 185,000

Pole position
Driver	David Gilliland	Robert Yates Racing
- Time: 48.304

Qualifying race winners
Duel 1 Winner	Tony Stewart	Joe Gibbs Racing
Duel 2 Winner	Jeff Gordon	Hendrick Motorsports

Most laps led
Driver	Kurt Busch	Penske Racing
- Laps: 95

Winner
No. 29	Kevin Harvick	Richard Childress Racing

Television in the United States
- Network: Fox
- Announcers: Mike Joy, Darrell Waltrip and Larry McReynolds
- Nielsen ratings: 10.1/20 (17.53 million viewers)

The 2007 Daytona 500 (officially the 49th Annual Daytona 500) was a NASCAR Nextel Cup Series stock car race that was held on February 18, 2007, at Daytona International Speedway in Daytona Beach, Florida before 185,000 spectators. It was the first race of the 2007 NASCAR Nextel Cup Series season and the 49th running of the event. Richard Childress Racing driver Kevin Harvick won the 202-lap race, which was extended from its scheduled distance of 200 laps due to a green–white–checkered finish. Mark Martin of Ginn Racing finished second and Harvick's teammate Jeff Burton came in third.

== Background ==
=== Preview ===
Daytona International Speedway (pictured in 2015), where the race was held.

The Daytona 500 was confirmed to be included in the NASCAR Nextel Cup Series' 2007 schedule in August 2006. It was the first of 36 scheduled stock car races for the 2007 NASCAR Nextel Cup Series and the 49th annual edition of the event. The race was held on February 18, 2007 at the Daytona International Speedway in Daytona Beach, Florida, with a scheduled distance of 200 laps and 500 mi (800 km). The track is a 2.5 mi (4.0 km) superspeedway and has four corners, which are banked as high as 31 degrees. The front stretch, where the start-finish line is located, is banked at 18 degrees, while the back stretch has three-degree banking. The event was first introduced to the series' calendar in February 1959 and became the season-opening race of the series in 1982. It is considered one of NASCAR's crown jewel races, alongside the Coca-Cola 600, Southern 500, and Brickyard 400. Jimmie Johnson was the defending race winner.

=== Entries ===
Sixty-one cars were officially entered for the Daytona 500, representing four different manufacturers and 29 teams. Among the many stories heading into the event was the Cup Series debut of Toyota, which became the first foreign car manufacturer to compete in the series since Alfa Romeo in 1962. Toyota supplied their Camry vehicle for Bill Davis Racing, Michael Waltrip Racing (MWR), and the newly-formed Red Bull Racing Team. High expectations surrounded Juan Pablo Montoya, a winner in Formula One and the Indianapolis 500, as he was set to begin his highly publicized rookie season with Chip Ganassi Racing. Former Champ Car World Series driver A. J. Allmendinger also prepared for his series debut as he was teamed with Brian Vickers at the Red Bull Racing Team; Vickers' former seat at Hendrick Motorsports was taken by Casey Mears. Mark Martin ended his 19-year tenure with Roush Fenway Racing to race part-time with Ginn Racing beginning at Daytona, allowing David Ragan to replace him in the No. 6 car. James Hylton, the 1966 Rookie of the Year, hoped to become the oldest driver to start a Cup Series race at 72 years old with his self-owned Chevrolet. Eight-time ARCA Re/Max Series champion Frank Kimmel joined Fast Track Racing in his attempt to make his Daytona 500 debut.

== Testing ==
To prepare for the race, NASCAR hosted six days of testing split into twelve sessions, named the Jackson Hewitt Preseason Thunder, at Daytona International Speedway; the first three sessions were held from January 8 to 10, and the latter three took place from January 15 to 17. The sessions began at 9:00 a.m. Eastern Standard Time (UTC−05:00), were paused for an hour-long lunch break at 12:00 p.m., and ended at 5:00 p.m. Derrike Cope, Elliott, Kevin Lepage, and Morgan Shepherd did not take part in any of the testing sessions. Tony Stewart and Robby Gordon were substituted by Mike McLaughlin and P. J. Jones, respectively, with Gordon opting to compete in the Dakar Rally.

On the morning of January 8, Tony Raines was quickest of the 25 participants with a speed of 183.974 mph (296.077 km/h). The afternoon session that day was cancelled due to rainfall and rescheduled to January 11. Between the 26 drivers who completed laps on January 9, Jamie McMurray topped the speed charts in the morning session at 184.090 mph (296.264 km/h), and Dale Earnhardt Jr.'s 186.606 mph (300.313 km/h) lap made him fastest in the afternoon session. On January 10, McLaughlin posted the fastest speed in the morning at 184.483 mph (296.897 km/h), while Jeff Green was quickest in the afternoon with a speed of 186.722 mph (300.500 km/h). To end the first week of testing, Ricky Rudd was fastest between 16 drivers on the morning of January 11 at 186.405 mph (299.990 km/h).

Because rain had drenched the track until 11:00 AM, the morning and afternoon sessions were combined and the lunch break was cancelled for January 15. With 34 drivers taking part, David Gilliland topped the speed charts at 185.090 mph (297.873 km/h). Montoya was quickest on the morning of January 16 with a speed of 184.574 mph (297.043 km/h), but collided with the wall as Mike Wallace spun. Ryan Newman's lap speed of 186.540 mph (300.207 km/h) made him quickest of the afternoon session. With five minutes left in the session, Kurt Busch's engine expired and he parked off-track with a trail of smoke. On January 17, Kurt Busch posted the fastest speed of 191.188 mph (307.687 km/h) with a Car of Tomorrow, set to debut in the Food City 500, which utilized a 1 1/8-inch (29 mm) restrictor plate instead of the standard 7/8-inch (22 mm) plate. The afternoon session, which ended at 1:30 PM due to rain, was led by Paul Menard with a speed of 187.099 mph (301.107 km/h).

== Practice and qualifying ==
Six practice sessions were held prior to the race. The first two sessions on February 10 lasted 120 and 90 minutes, respectively. The next two on February 14 ran for 55 and 50 minutes. A 60-minute session was held on February 16, followed by an 80-minute session the next day. Rudd posted the fastest lap of the first practice session with a time of 48.374 seconds, with Robert Yates Racing (RYR) teammate Gilliland in second, Sterling Marlin in third, Jeff Gordon in fourth, and Elliott Sadler in fifth. The session was briefly halted for Dave Blaney, whose engine had expired. Rudd was again fastest during the second practice session with a 48.190-second lap, besting Marlin, Gilliland, Jeremy Mayfield, and Jeff Gordon.

The qualifying session was held on February 11. Unlike most NASCAR races, it only determined the top two starting positions for the Daytona 500. Positions third through 39th would be determined by the Gatorade Duels on February 15; the four fastest drivers of qualifying who weren't already locked in to the race would occupy the last four positions, three if a champion's provisional was to be used for the most recent series champion that wasn't already guaranteed to compete in the race. With a lap of 48.304 seconds, Gilliland earned his first career pole position and was joined on the grid's front row by Rudd, who was almost two tenths of a second slower. It was the second time, and the first since 2000, that two RYR drivers qualified on the front row in the Daytona 500.

Now, I'm ready to bear all responsibility for what happened. I encourage you to ask me any questions or write your opinions because you can't hurt me any worse than I am right now. My beautiful 9-year-old asked her mom on Monday why Daddy cheated the rules. That hurts pretty bad. I love NASCAR. I hate that I've caused this sort of commotion around their wonderful sport. This is the Daytona 500. We're not supposed to be talking about some stupid fuel thing that we put in the car. We're supposed to be talking about the pageantry and glory of what it means to win this race. I'm embarrassed to be sitting here in front of you, taking up your time talking about something that doesn't have anything to do with what the fans have come to see.

— Michael Waltrip's emotional apology on February 15.

Two days after qualifying, Matt Kenseth and Kasey Kahne were both docked 50 Drivers' Championship points and their entries lost 50 Owners' Championship points after NASCAR officials discovered unapproved holes in their cars which enhanced their aerodynamics. Their qualifying times were also disallowed, forcing them to start at the rear for the second Duel race. In addition, their crew chiefs, Robbie Reiser and Kenny Francis, were suspended for the first four races of the season and fined $50,000. Kahne's Evernham Motorsports teammates, Scott Riggs and Sadler, were found to have illegal bolts in their spoilers and were penalized with a loss of 25 drivers' and owners' points, while their crew chiefs (Rodney Childers and Josh Browne) faced a two-race suspension and a $25,000 fine. The following day, Michael Waltrip's crew chief David Hyder and MWR's director of competition Bobby Kennedy were both escorted out of Daytona and suspended indefinitely after NASCAR officials found an unidentified illegal substance in two of his intake manifolds and confiscated Waltrip's car. Hyder was levied a $100,000 fine, the largest in the history of the sport, (Note: The record was broken in 2009 when Carl Long's crew chief Charles Swing was fined $200,000 for an oversized engine in Long's car.) while Waltrip was docked 100 drivers' points and his entry 100 owners' points.

Kenseth was the quickest driver of the third practice session with a time of 47.801 seconds; Reed Sorenson, Mears, Wallace, and Derrike Cope rounded out the top-five. Riggs, Rudd, Menard, Hamlin, Carl Edwards, and Gilliland all scraped the wall and damaged their cars throughout the session due to the windy air conditions. Newman topped the fourth practice session later that day at 47.957 seconds, ahead of Jeff Burton, Blaney, Stewart, and Greg Biffle. Stewart and Gordon won the Gatorade Duels the day after and secured the third and fourth positions on the starting grid, respectively. However, Gordon's car was found to be an inch too low in post-race inspections because the shock mount and spacers intended to hold the rear shock absorber were misaligned, and he was thus forced to start the Daytona 500 in 42nd place. The 18 drivers that failed to qualify for the race were Mayfield, Mike Skinner, Regan Smith, Ward Burton, Menard, Allmendinger, Lepage, Bill Elliott, Vickers, Kenny Wallace, Kimmel, Mike Bliss, Eric McClure, Stanton Barrett, Kirk Shelmerdine, Cope, Brandon Whitt, and Hylton.

Rudd was fastest in the fifth practice session with a timed lap of 47.315 seconds, with Biffle in second, Martin Truex Jr. in third, Kurt Busch in fourth, and Blaney in fifth. David Stremme's lap time of 47.342 seconds made him the quickest driver of the final practice session, besting Kyle Busch, Johnny Sauter, Joe Nemechek, and Ragan.

=== Qualifying results ===
Grid	No.	Driver	Team	Manufacturer	Reason
1	38	David Gilliland	Robert Yates Racing	Ford	Fastest in pole qualifying
2	88	Ricky Rudd	Robert Yates Racing	Ford	Second-fastest in pole qualifying
3	20	Tony Stewart	Joe Gibbs Racing	Chevrolet	Duel 1 winner
4	2	Kurt Busch	Penske Racing	Dodge	Second place in Duel 2
5	8	Dale Earnhardt Jr.	Dale Earnhardt, Inc.	Chevrolet	Second place in Duel 1
6	40	David Stremme	Chip Ganassi Racing	Dodge	Third place in Duel 2
7	31	Jeff Burton	Richard Childress Racing	Chevrolet	Third place in Duel 1
8	5	Kyle Busch	Hendrick Motorsports	Chevrolet	Fourth place in Duel 2
9	11	Denny Hamlin	Joe Gibbs Racing	Chevrolet	Fifth place in Duel 1
10	17	Matt Kenseth	Roush Fenway Racing	Ford	Fifth place in Duel 2
11	07	Clint Bowyer	Richard Childress Racing	Chevrolet	Sixth place in Duel 1
12^{1}	18	J. J. Yeley	Joe Gibbs Racing	Chevrolet	Sixth place in Duel 2
13	1	Martin Truex Jr.	Dale Earnhardt, Inc.	Chevrolet	Seventh place in Duel 1
14	99	Carl Edwards	Roush Fenway Racing	Ford	Seventh place in Duel 2
15	55	Michael Waltrip	Michael Waltrip Racing	Toyota	Eighth place in Duel 1
16	12	Ryan Newman	Penske Racing	Dodge	Eighth place in Duel 2
17	25	Casey Mears	Hendrick Motorsports	Chevrolet	Ninth place in Duel 1
18	13	Joe Nemechek	Ginn Racing	Chevrolet	Ninth place in Duel 2
19	21	Ken Schrader	Wood Brothers Racing	Ford	Tenth place in Duel 1
20	96	Tony Raines	Hall of Fame Racing	Chevrolet	Tenth place in Duel 2
21	48	Jimmie Johnson	Hendrick Motorsports	Chevrolet	Eleventh place in Duel 1
22	09	Mike Wallace	Phoenix Racing	Chevrolet	Eleventh place in Duel 2
23	60	Boris Said	No Fear Racing	Ford	Twelfth place in Duel 1
24	26	Jamie McMurray	Roush Fenway Racing	Ford	Thirteenth place in Duel 2
25	16	Greg Biffle	Roush Fenway Racing	Ford	Sixteenth place in Duel 1
26	01	Mark Martin	Ginn Racing	Chevrolet	Fourteenth place in Duel 2
27	43	Bobby Labonte	Petty Enterprises	Dodge	Twenty-second place in Duel 1
28	9	Kasey Kahne	Gillett Evernham Motorsports	Dodge	Sixteenth place in Duel 2
29	45	Kyle Petty	Petty Enterprises	Dodge	Twenty-fourth place in Duel 1
30	19	Elliott Sadler	Gillett Evernham Motorsports	Dodge	Twenty-first place in Duel 2
31	66	Jeff Green	Haas CNC Racing	Chevrolet	Twenty-fifth place in Duel 1
32	10	Scott Riggs	Gillett Evernham Motorsports	Dodge	Twenty-fifth place in Duel 2
33^{1}	41	Reed Sorenson	Chip Ganassi Racing	Dodge	Twenty-seventh place in Duel 1
34	29	Kevin Harvick	Richard Childress Racing	Chevrolet	Twenty-ninth place in Duel 2
35	6	David Ragan	Roush Fenway Racing	Ford	Twenty-eighth place in Duel 1
36	42	Juan Pablo Montoya	Chip Ganassi Racing	Dodge	Thirtieth place in Duel 2
37	22	Dave Blaney	Bill Davis Racing	Toyota	Thirtieth place in Duel 1
38	14	Sterling Marlin	Ginn Racing	Chevrolet	Eighth-fastest in pole qualifying
39	7	Robby Gordon	Robby Gordon Motorsports	Ford	Thirty-first place in Duel 1
40^{1}	00	David Reutimann	Michael Waltrip Racing	Toyota	Fourteenth-fastest in pole qualifying
41	70	Johnny Sauter	Haas CNC Racing	Chevrolet	Ninth-fastest in pole qualifying
42	24	Jeff Gordon	Hendrick Motorsports	Chevrolet	Duel 2 winner, inspection failure
43	44	Dale Jarrett	Michael Waltrip Racing	Toyota	Champion's provisional
Failed to qualify
44	36	Jeremy Mayfield	Bill Davis Racing	Toyota	
45	23	Mike Skinner	Bill Davis Racing	Toyota	
46	39	Regan Smith	Ginn Racing	Chevrolet	
47	4	Ward Burton	Morgan-McClure Motorsports	Chevrolet	
48	15	Paul Menard	Dale Earnhardt, Inc.	Chevrolet	
49	84	A. J. Allmendinger	Red Bull Racing Team	Toyota	
50	34	Kevin Lepage	Front Row Motorsports	Dodge	
51	37	Bill Elliott	Front Row Motorsports	Dodge	
52	83	Brian Vickers	Red Bull Racing Team	Toyota	
53	78	Kenny Wallace	Furniture Row Racing	Chevrolet	
54	71	Frank Kimmel	Fast Track Racing	Ford	
55	49	Mike Bliss	BAM Racing	Dodge	
56	04	Eric McClure	Morgan-McClure Motorsports	Chevrolet	
57	30	Stanton Barrett	Rick Ware Racing	Chevrolet	
58	27	Kirk Shelmerdine	Kirk Shelmerdine Racing	Chevrolet	
59	72	Brandon Whitt	CJM Racing	Chevrolet	
60	74	Derrike Cope	McGlynn Racing	Dodge	
61	58	James Hylton	Hylton Motorsports	Chevrolet	
^{1} Moved to the back of the grid for changing transmissions

== Race ==
Live television coverage of the race in the United States was broadcast on Fox and began at 2:01 p.m. Mike Joy, Darrell Waltrip, and Larry McReynolds provided commentary for the race. Weather conditions towards the beginning of the race were breezy and sunny, with air temperatures recorded at 51 and 54 °F (11 and 12 °C) and track temperatures at 79 °F (26 °C), with 17 to 25 mph (27 to 40 km/h) wind gusts. A sellout crowd of 185,000 spectators attended the race. Pre-race festivities began with a moment of silence for the victims of the 2007 Groundhog Day tornado outbreak and an invocation from Reverend Doctor Victor E. Gooden. Country music band Big & Rich performed the national anthem, and actor Nicolas Cage commanded the drivers to start their engines. A military flyover by McDonnell Douglas F-15 Eagles proceeded afterward. Cal Ripken Jr., who had recently been inducted into the National Baseball Hall of Fame, was the honorary pace car driver. Prior to the race, three drivers (J. J. Yeley, Sorenson, and David Reutimann) fell to the rear of the grid for changing transmissions.

To start the race, the green flag was waved at 3:30 p.m. by Phil Parsons, whose brother Benny had passed away a month prior due to lung cancer. Gilliland maintained his pole position advantage and held onto the lead, while Rudd fell to sixth place by lap two. Kurt Busch and Stewart also improved to second and third, respectively. On the sixth lap, Earnhardt Jr.'s car briefly spewed tire smoke as he drove over the many bumps in the corners. Seven laps later, Jeff Gordon's car drifted up into the outside wall in turn two while he ran 21st. The first caution flag of the race was issued on lap 18 when Boris Said collided with the left-side door of Reutimann exiting turn two and spun through the pavement on the back stretch. All of the leaders made pit stops for tires and fuel, and a quick two-tire stop for Kurt Busch allowed him to take the lead for the restart on lap 21, followed by Gilliland, Stewart, Earnhardt Jr., and Newman.

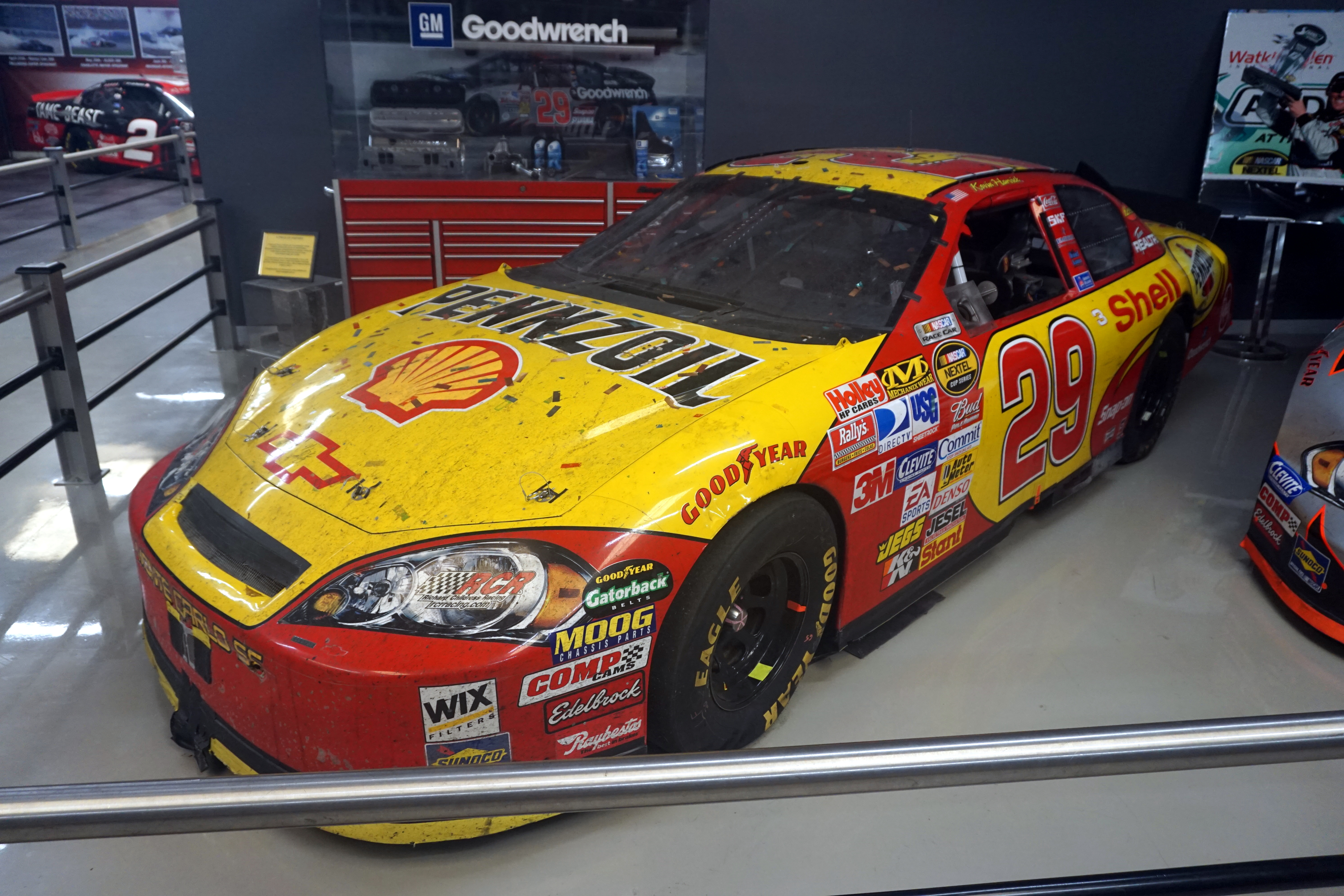
Kevin Harvick's 2007 Daytona 500-winning No. 29 Pennzoil Chevrolet Monte Carlo

On lap 152, Stewart got on the apron in turn 4, got loose, and spun into Kurt Busch. He spun to a halt, while Busch kept the engine going and went to the garage area for repairs. However, with 46 laps to go, he was unable to continue and did not finish the race. A fourth caution came on lap 175 when a 5-car crash involving Reutimann, Denny Hamlin, Jimmie Johnson, Jeff Green and Tony Raines occurred in the backstretch. Mark Martin took the lead shortly before the yellow flag came out. Another crash which took out Ken Schrader happened on lap 186, after contact from Dave Blaney who was parked for the remainder of the race (who may have been unaware of his right front tire being flat according to Darrell Waltrip). With 5 laps to go, Matt Kenseth ran into Jamie McMurray, who hit the wall and collected Dale Earnhardt Jr. with him. Ricky Rudd and Martin Truex Jr. were collected as well. Rudd remained on the lead lap, but Truex fell a lap down. McMurray and Earnhardt Jr. both were out of the race, finishing 31st and 32nd, respectively. The race was delayed for approximately 12 minutes for cleanup under the red flag. This set up a green-white-checkered finish.

With 2 laps to go, an outside line began to form, with Kevin Harvick, Kenseth and Jeff Burton. Martin came to the white flag looking for a victory. On the backstretch, Kyle Busch, sitting 2nd place, tried both ways to get around Martin. Meanwhile, Kenseth began to bump-draft Harvick, with Burton in tow. Harvick flew by David Stremme, Gilliland, Mike Wallace, David Ragan and Greg Biffle. Busch, trying to get around Martin and block Harvick at the same, nearly squeezed Harvick into the wall as Harvick zipped past him and pulled even with Martin. Harvick and Martin, Busch and Kenseth, and Biffle and Burton were side by side out of turn 4. With the checkered flag in sight, Busch hit the apron, getting him loose. He spun out and started a chain reaction collecting most of the field. Clint Bowyer took the worst hit, turning over on his roof and skidding across the finish line on it while on fire before flipping back upright in the grass. Harvick beat Martin by .02 of a second to claim the victory. After being 6th place out of turn 4, Burton finished 3rd. Mike Wallace and David Ragan were surprises, rounding out the Top 5.

=== Race results ===
Pos	Grid	Car No.	Driver	Team	Manufacturer	Laps	Laps Led	Status
1	34	29	Kevin Harvick	Richard Childress Racing	Chevrolet	202	4	Running
2	26	01	Mark Martin	Ginn Racing	Chevrolet	202	26	Running
3	7	31	Jeff Burton	Richard Childress Racing	Chevrolet	202	0	Running
4	22	09	Mike Wallace	Phoenix Racing	Chevrolet	202	0	Running
5	35	6	David Ragan (R)	Roush Racing	Ford	202	0	Running
6	30	19	Elliott Sadler	Evernham Motorsports	Dodge	202	0	Running
7	28	9	Kasey Kahne	Evernham Motorsports	Dodge	202	0	Running
8	1	38	David Gilliland (R)	Robert Yates Racing	Ford	202	18	Running
9	18	13	Joe Nemechek	Ginn Racing	Chevrolet	202	0	Running
10	42	24	Jeff Gordon (W)	Hendrick Motorsports	Chevrolet	202	0	Running
11	6	40	David Stremme	Chip Ganassi Racing	Dodge	202	0	Running
12	12	18	J. J. Yeley	Joe Gibbs Racing	Chevrolet	202	0	Running
13	33	41	Reed Sorenson	Chip Ganassi Racing	Dodge	202	0	Running
14	23	60	Boris Said	No Fear Racing	Ford	202	0	Running
15	39	7	Robby Gordon	Robby Gordon Motorsports	Ford	202	0	Running
16	41	70	Johnny Sauter	Haas CNC Racing	Chevrolet	202	0	Running
17	38	14	Sterling Marlin (W)	Ginn Racing	Chevrolet	202	1	Running
18	11	07	Clint Bowyer	Richard Childress Racing	Chevrolet	202	0	Running
19	36	42	Juan Pablo Montoya (R)	Chip Ganassi Racing	Dodge	202	0	Running
20	17	25	Casey Mears	Hendrick Motorsports	Chevrolet	202	0	Running
21	17	43	Bobby Labonte	Petty Enterprises	Dodge	202	0	Running
22	43	44	Dale Jarrett (W)	Michael Waltrip Racing	Toyota	202	0	Running
23	14	99	Carl Edwards	Roush Racing	Ford	202	0	Running
24	8	5	Kyle Busch	Hendrick Motorsports	Chevrolet	202	4	Running
25	25	16	Greg Biffle	Roush Racing	Ford	202	0	Running
26	2	88	Ricky Rudd	Robert Yates Racing	Ford	202	0	Running
27	10	17	Matt Kenseth	Roush Racing	Ford	202	6	Running
28	9	11	Denny Hamlin	Joe Gibbs Racing	Chevrolet	201	0	Flagged
29	13	1	Martin Truex Jr.	Dale Earnhardt, Inc.	Chevrolet	201	13	Flagged
30	15	55	Michael Waltrip (W)	Michael Waltrip Racing	Toyota	200	0	Flagged
31	24	26	Jamie McMurray	Roush Racing	Ford	195	0	Accident
32	5	8	Dale Earnhardt Jr. (W)	Dale Earnhardt, Inc.	Chevrolet	195	0	Accident
33	20	96	Tony Raines	Hall of Fame Racing	Chevrolet	195	0	Flagged
34	37	22	Dave Blaney	Bill Davis Racing	Toyota	186	0	Parked
35	19	21	Ken Schrader	Wood Brothers Racing	Ford	185	0	Accident
36	31	66	Jeff Green	Haas CNC Racing	Chevrolet	181	0	Flagged
37	32	10	Scott Riggs	Evernham Motorsports	Dodge	179	0	Flagged
38	16	12	Ryan Newman	Penske Racing	Dodge	175	1	Engine
39	21	48	Jimmie Johnson (W)	Hendrick Motorsports	Chevrolet	173	0	Accident
40	40	00	David Reutimann (R)	Michael Waltrip Racing	Toyota	173	0	Accident
41	4	2	Kurt Busch	Penske Racing	Dodge	166	95	Flagged
42	29	45	Kyle Petty	Petty Enterprises	Dodge	160	0	Flagged
43	3	20	Tony Stewart	Joe Gibbs Racing	Chevrolet	152	35	Accident

== Controversy over the finish ==
Because of an incident between Casey Mears and Dale Jarrett at the 2003 Sylvania 300 in New Hampshire International Speedway, NASCAR mandated a "freezing of the field" policy whenever a caution flag is thrown, effectively ending the phenomenon that is racing back to the caution. Such a flag did not fly after the last-lap crash. There is some disputed visual evidence that suggests that, if the caution had flown strictly according to NASCAR rules, Martin may have won.

The issue was especially passionate because Martin was in his 23rd Daytona 500 start and had never won. Such a win, arguably, would have been popular with fans, similar to Dale Earnhardt's 1998 victory (in his 20th start) or Darrell Waltrip's 1989 triumph (in his 17th). Martin retired following the 2013 season, never having achieved a Daytona 500 victory in his 29 attempts.

In some races, NASCAR has permitted the cars to run to the finish in case of more "minor" spins on the last lap.

== Notes and references ==
=== References ===
Preceded by 2006 Ford 400	NASCAR Nextel Cup Series Season; 2007	Succeeded by 2007 Auto Club 500
