= 2019 Gander RV Duels =

Qualifying races for the 2019 Daytona 500

Race details
- Date: February 14, 2019
- Location: Daytona International Speedway; Daytona Beach, Florida
- Course: Permanent racing facility 2.5 mi (4 km)
- Distance: Race 1: 60 laps, 150 mi (240 km); Race 2: 60 laps, 150 mi (240 km)
- Avg Speed: Race 1: 177.749 mph (286.059 km/h); Race 2: 193.133 mph (310.817 km/h)

Race 1
- Pole position: William Byron
- Most laps led: Kevin Harvick (44)
- Winner: Kevin Harvick

Race 2
- Pole position: Alex Bowman
- Most laps led: Clint Bowyer (41)
- Winner: Joey Logano

Television
- Network: FS1 & MRN
- Announcers: Mike Joy, Jeff Gordon and Darrell Waltrip (Television); Alex Hayden, Jeff Striegle and Rusty Wallace (Booth); Dave Moody (1 & 2), Mike Bagley (Backstretch) and Kyle Rickey (3 & 4) (Turns) (Radio)
- Nielsen Ratings: 1.725 million

The 2019 Gander RV Duels were a pair of Monster Energy NASCAR Cup Series stock car races held on February 14, 2019, at Daytona International Speedway in Daytona Beach, Florida. Both contested over 60 laps, they were the qualifying races for the 2019 Daytona 500.

== Report ==
=== Background ===
Daytona International Speedway, where the races will be held.

Daytona International Speedway is one of six superspeedways to hold NASCAR races, the others being Michigan International Speedway, Auto Club Speedway, Indianapolis Motor Speedway, Pocono Raceway and Talladega Superspeedway. The standard track at Daytona International Speedway is a four–turn superspeedway that is 2.5-mile (4.0 km) long. The track's turns are banked at 31 degrees, while the front stretch, the location of the finish line, is banked at 18 degrees.

== Qualifying ==
William Byron scored the pole for the race with a time of 46.319 and a speed of 194.305 mph (312.704 km/h).

=== Qualifying results ===
Pos	No	Driver	Team	Manufacturer	R1	R2
1	24	William Byron	Hendrick Motorsports	Chevrolet	46.432	46.319
2	88	Alex Bowman	Hendrick Motorsports	Chevrolet	46.408	46.355
3	48	Jimmie Johnson	Hendrick Motorsports	Chevrolet	46.649	46.438
4	9	Chase Elliott	Hendrick Motorsports	Chevrolet	46.469	46.444
5	8	Daniel Hemric (R)	Richard Childress Racing	Chevrolet	46.861	46.763
6	22	Joey Logano	Team Penske	Ford	46.782	46.766
7	19	Martin Truex Jr.	Joe Gibbs Racing	Toyota	46.803	46.789
8	14	Clint Bowyer	Stewart-Haas Racing	Ford	46.857	46.804
9	2	Brad Keselowski	Team Penske	Ford	46.797	46.811
10	3	Austin Dillon	Richard Childress Racing	Chevrolet	46.938	47.018
11	21	Paul Menard	Wood Brothers Racing	Ford	47.072	47.094
12	11	Denny Hamlin	Joe Gibbs Racing	Toyota	47.009	47.246
13	18	Kyle Busch	Joe Gibbs Racing	Toyota	47.080	—
14	20	Erik Jones	Joe Gibbs Racing	Toyota	47.089	—
15	4	Kevin Harvick	Stewart-Haas Racing	Ford	47.131	—
16	31	Tyler Reddick (i)	Richard Childress Racing	Chevrolet	47.161	—
17	12	Ryan Blaney	Team Penske	Ford	47.170	—
18	17	Ricky Stenhouse Jr.	Roush Fenway Racing	Ford	47.177	—
19	10	Aric Almirola	Stewart-Haas Racing	Ford	47.185	—
20	41	Daniel Suárez	Stewart-Haas Racing	Ford	47.195	—
21	1	Kurt Busch	Chip Ganassi Racing	Chevrolet	47.222	—
22	37	Chris Buescher	JTG Daugherty Racing	Chevrolet	47.261	—
23	38	David Ragan	Front Row Motorsports	Ford	47.264	—
24	6	Ryan Newman	Roush Fenway Racing	Ford	47.364	—
25	34	Michael McDowell	Front Row Motorsports	Ford	47.374	—
26	27	Casey Mears	Germain Racing	Chevrolet	47.406	—
27	71	Ryan Truex (i)	Tommy Baldwin Racing	Chevrolet	47.434	—
28	47	Ryan Preece (R)	JTG Daugherty Racing	Chevrolet	47.441	—
29	40	Jamie McMurray	Spire Motorsports	Chevrolet	47.498	—
30	95	Matt DiBenedetto	Leavine Family Racing	Toyota	47.515	—
31	62	Brendan Gaughan (i)	Beard Motorsports	Chevrolet	47.520	—
32	42	Kyle Larson	Chip Ganassi Racing	Chevrolet	47.565	—
33	43	Bubba Wallace	Richard Petty Motorsports	Chevrolet	47.571	—
34	13	Ty Dillon	Germain Racing	Chevrolet	47.691	—
35	36	Matt Tifft (R)	Front Row Motorsports	Ford	47.703	—
36	96	Parker Kligerman (i)	Gaunt Brothers Racing	Toyota	47.820	—
37	15	Ross Chastain (i)	Premium Motorsports	Chevrolet	47.898	—
38	00	Landon Cassill	StarCom Racing	Chevrolet	48.025	—
39	32	Corey LaJoie	Go Fas Racing	Ford	48.427	—
40	52	Cody Ware (R)	Rick Ware Racing	Chevrolet	48.983	—
41	51	B. J. McLeod (i)	Petty Ware Racing	Chevrolet	49.266	—
42	66	Joey Gase (i)	MBM Motorsports	Toyota	49.743	—
Official qualifying results

== Duels ==
=== Duel 1 ===
Parker Kligerman would race his way into the field in Duel 1, with Tyler Reddick also advancing as the fastest open car in time trial qualifying.

==== Duel 1 results ====
Pos	Grid	No	Driver	Team	Manufacturer	Laps	Points
1	8	4	Kevin Harvick	Stewart-Haas Racing	Ford	60	10
2	10	17	Ricky Stenhouse Jr.	Roush Fenway Racing	Ford	60	9
3	6	21	Paul Menard	Wood Brothers Racing	Ford	60	8
4	16	95	Matt DiBenedetto	Leavine Family Racing	Toyota	60	7
5	4	19	Martin Truex Jr.	Joe Gibbs Racing	Toyota	60	6
6	17	43	Bubba Wallace	Richard Petty Motorsports	Chevrolet	60	5
7	12	37	Chris Buescher	JTG Daugherty Racing	Chevrolet	60	4
8	2	48	Jimmie Johnson	Hendrick Motorsports	Chevrolet	60	3
9	13	6	Ryan Newman	Roush Fenway Racing	Ford	60	2
10	15	47	Ryan Preece (R)	JTG Daugherty Racing	Chevrolet	60	1
11	11	41	Daniel Suárez	Stewart-Haas Racing	Ford	60	0
12	19	96	Parker Kligerman (i)	Gaunt Brothers Racing	Toyota	60	0
13	9	31	Tyler Reddick (i)	Richard Childress Racing	Chevrolet	60	0
14	14	71	Ryan Truex (i)	Tommy Baldwin Racing	Chevrolet	60	0
15	20	00	Landon Cassill	StarCom Racing	Chevrolet	60	0
16	1	24	William Byron	Hendrick Motorsports	Chevrolet	60	0
17	3	8	Daniel Hemric (R)	Richard Childress Racing	Chevrolet	59	0
18	7	18	Kyle Busch	Joe Gibbs Racing	Toyota	59	0
19	18	36	Matt Tifft (R)	Front Row Motorsports	Ford	59	0
20	5	2	Brad Keselowski	Team Penske	Ford	58	0
21	21	52	Cody Ware (R)	Rick Ware Racing	Chevrolet	58	0
Official race results

=== Duel 2 ===
Brendan Gaughan would race his way into the field in Duel 2, with Casey Mears also advancing as the second-fastest open car in time trial qualifying.

==== Duel 2 results ====
Pos	Grid	No	Driver	Team	Manufacturer	Laps	Points
1	3	22	Joey Logano	Team Penske	Ford	60	10
2	4	14	Clint Bowyer	Stewart-Haas Racing	Ford	60	9
3	9	10	Aric Almirola	Stewart-Haas Racing	Ford	60	8
4	6	11	Denny Hamlin	Joe Gibbs Racing	Toyota	60	7
5	10	1	Kurt Busch	Chip Ganassi Racing	Chevrolet	60	6
6	8	12	Ryan Blaney	Team Penske	Ford	60	5
7	14	40	Jamie McMurray	Spire Motorsports	Chevrolet	60	4
8	2	9	Chase Elliott	Hendrick Motorsports	Chevrolet	60	3
9	5	3	Austin Dillon	Richard Childress Racing	Chevrolet	60	2
10	17	13	Ty Dillon	Germain Racing	Chevrolet	60	1
11	11	38	David Ragan	Front Row Motorsports	Ford	60	0
12	16	42	Kyle Larson	Chip Ganassi Racing	Chevrolet	60	0
13	1	88	Alex Bowman	Hendrick Motorsports	Chevrolet	59	0
14	7	20	Erik Jones	Joe Gibbs Racing	Toyota	59	0
15	15	62	Brendan Gaughan (i)	Beard Motorsports	Chevrolet	59	0
16	19	32	Corey LaJoie	Go Fas Racing	Ford	59	0
17	13	27	Casey Mears	Germain Racing	Chevrolet	59	0
18	12	34	Michael McDowell	Front Row Motorsports	Ford	58	0
19	18	15	Ross Chastain (i)	Premium Motorsports	Chevrolet	57	0
20	21	66	Joey Gase (i)	MBM Motorsports	Toyota	57	0
21	20	51	B. J. McLeod (i)	Petty Ware Racing	Chevrolet	57	0
Official race results

== Media ==
=== Television ===
FS1
Booth announcers	Pit reporters
Lap-by-lap: Mike Joy; Color-commentator: Jeff Gordon; Color commentator: Darrell Waltrip	Jamie Little; Regan Smith; Vince Welch; Matt Yocum

=== Radio ===
MRN Radio
Booth announcers	Turn announcers	Pit reporters
Lead announcer: Alex Hayden; Announcer: Jeff Striegle; Announcer: Rusty Wallace	Turns 1 & 2: Dave Moody; Backstretch: Mike Bagley; Turns 3 & 4: Kyle Rickey	Winston Kelley; Steve Post; Dillon Welch; Kim Coon
