= 2004 Daytona 500 =

46th iteration of the Daytona 500

Race details
- Race 1 of 36 in the 2004 NASCAR Nextel Cup Series
- 2004 Daytona 500 logo
- Date: February 15, 2004
- Location: Daytona International Speedway, Daytona Beach, Florida
- Course: Permanent racing facility 2.5 mi (4.02336 km)
- Distance: 200 laps, 500 mi (804.672 km)
- Weather: Temperatures reaching up to 73 °F (23 °C); wind speeds approaching 20 miles per hour (32 km/h)
- Average speed: 156.341 miles per hour (251.606 km/h)

Pole position
Driver	Greg Biffle	Roush Racing
- Time: 47.774

Qualifying race winners
Duel 1 Winner	Dale Earnhardt Jr.	Dale Earnhardt, Inc.
Duel 2 Winner	Elliott Sadler	Robert Yates Racing

Most laps led
Driver	Tony Stewart	Joe Gibbs Racing
- Laps: 98

Winner
No. 8	Dale Earnhardt Jr.	Dale Earnhardt, Inc.

Television in the United States
- Network: NBC
- Announcers: Allen Bestwick, Benny Parsons, and Wally Dallenbach Jr.
- Nielsen ratings: 10.6/24 (17.8 million viewers)

The 2004 Daytona 500, the 46th running of the event, was the first race of the 2004 NASCAR Nextel Cup season. It was a race held on February 15, 2004, at Daytona International Speedway in Daytona Beach, Florida. The race was televised by NBC, with Allen Bestwick, 1975 race winner Benny Parsons, and Wally Dallenbach Jr. calling the action for the second time after the 2002 race. It was the first NASCAR Nextel Cup race to air in high definition.

This was the first Daytona 500 without 2-time Daytona 500 Champion and 4-time pole-sitter Bill Elliott since 1976.

Dale Earnhardt Jr. won the race, making this his first Daytona 500 victory exactly six years to the day after his father Dale Earnhardt Sr. won his first and only Daytona 500 in the 1998 race. Tony Stewart finished second and rookie Scott Wimmer finished third.

== Entry list ==
- (R) denotes rookie driver
- (W) denotes past 500 winner

No.	Driver	Team	Manufacturer
0	Ward Burton (W)	Haas CNC Racing	Chevrolet
1	John Andretti	Dale Earnhardt Inc.	Chevrolet
01	Joe Nemechek	MBV Motorsports	Chevrolet
2	Rusty Wallace	Penske-Jasper Racing	Dodge
4	Kevin Lepage	Morgan-McClure Motorsports	Chevrolet
5	Terry Labonte	Hendrick Motorsports	Chevrolet
6	Mark Martin	Roush Racing	Ford
7	Jimmy Spencer	Ultra Motorsports	Dodge
8	Dale Earnhardt Jr.	Dale Earnhardt Inc.	Chevrolet
9	Kasey Kahne (R)	Evernham Motorsports	Dodge
09	Johnny Benson Jr.	Phoenix Racing	Dodge
10	Scott Riggs (R)	MBV Motorsports	Chevrolet
12	Ryan Newman	Penske-Jasper Racing	Dodge
14	Larry Foyt	A. J. Foyt Racing	Dodge
15	Michael Waltrip (W)	Dale Earnhardt Inc.	Chevrolet
16	Greg Biffle	Roush Racing	Ford
17	Matt Kenseth	Roush Racing	Ford
18	Bobby Labonte	Joe Gibbs Racing	Chevrolet
19	Jeremy Mayfield	Evernham Motorsports	Dodge
20	Tony Stewart	Joe Gibbs Racing	Chevrolet
21	Ricky Rudd	Wood Brothers Racing	Ford
22	Scott Wimmer (R)	Bill Davis Racing	Dodge
23	Dave Blaney	Bill Davis Racing	Dodge
24	Jeff Gordon (W)	Hendrick Motorsports	Chevrolet
25	Brian Vickers (R)	Hendrick Motorsports	Chevrolet
29	Kevin Harvick	Richard Childress Racing	Chevrolet
30	Johnny Sauter (R)	Richard Childress Racing	Chevrolet
31	Robby Gordon	Richard Childress Racing	Chevrolet
32	Ricky Craven	PPI Motorsports	Chevrolet
33	Mike Skinner	Richard Childress Racing	Chevrolet
38	Elliott Sadler	Robert Yates Racing	Ford
40	Sterling Marlin	Chip Ganassi Racing	Dodge
41	Casey Mears	Chip Ganassi Racing	Dodge
42	Jamie McMurray	Chip Ganassi Racing	Dodge
43	Jeff Green	Petty Enterprises	Dodge
45	Kyle Petty	Petty Enterprises	Dodge
48	Jimmie Johnson	Hendrick Motorsports	Chevrolet
49	Ken Schrader	BAM Racing	Dodge
50	Derrike Cope (W)	Arnold Motorsports	Dodge
72	Kirk Shelmerdine	Kirk Shelmerdine Racing	Ford
77	Brendan Gaughan (R)	Penske-Jasper Racing	Dodge
88	Dale Jarrett (W)	Robert Yates Racing	Ford
90	Andy Hillenburg	Donlavey Racing	Ford
95	Andy Belmont	Sadler Brothers Racing	Ford
97	Kurt Busch	Roush Racing	Ford
99	Jeff Burton	Roush Racing	Ford

== Qualifying and Gatorade 125's ==
Greg Biffle won his first career Cup Series pole, but an engine change during Speedweeks forced him to go the rear of the field. The inside column of cars all moved up one row, promoting Dale Earnhardt Jr., who had won the first Gatorade 125, to the number one starting spot. Elliott Sadler won the second of the Gatorade 125s, after holding off two-time 500 winner Sterling Marlin. Of the 45 cars entered, the two who failed to qualify were Kirk Shelmerdine, driving his own #72 Ford Taurus, and ARCA veteran Andy Hillenburg in the #90 Ford Taurus, one of Junie Donlavey's final attempts at entering a Cup car. Andy Belmont was going to enter in the #95 for the Sadler Brothers but withdrew.

== Race summary ==
Before the start of the race, several cars had to move to the rear of the field: engine changes for polesitter Greg Biffle, Ryan Newman, Ricky Craven, and 1990 race winner Derrike Cope. Rookie and NEXTEL Cup debutant Scott Riggs started from the rear in a backup car. Biffle's move to the rear of the field meant that Gatorade Duel #1 winner Dale Earnhardt Jr. took over the first starting spot and led the opening laps.

Mark Martin, coming off a disappointing 2003 season, exited the race with a blown engine on lap 8, which brought out the first caution. On lap 26, his Roush Racing teammate Jeff Burton joined him in the garage, likewise with an engine failure. Kevin Harvick made the first lead change on lap 30. Four laps later, Cope spun in turn 4, collecting Scott Riggs; this would bring out the second caution. After the first round of green-flag pit stops, Tony Stewart took the lead. He and Jimmie Johnson swapped it a few times while navigating lapped cars (most of them were at the "tail-end" of the lead lap, given that the lap 34 crash occurred during pit stops) before Earnhardt Jr. reclaimed the lead.

On lap 60, the third caution was flown when Rusty Wallace, Ken Schrader, and Jeff Green crashed on the backstretch. After the restart, Stewart and Earnhardt Jr. both battled for the lead until a huge crash occurred in the back straightaway on lap 71. This started when rookies Brian Vickers and Johnny Sauter made contact, collecting Marlin, Newman, defending 500 winner Michael Waltrip, John Andretti, Kevin Lepage, Terry Labonte; Johnny Benson Jr.; Scott Riggs, Robby Gordon, and Jamie McMurray. Waltrip got the worst of it, as his car went into the infield grass. Waltrip hit Robby Gordon which caused his left rear wheel to come off. The friction, combined with the fact that the rains had washed out the Busch Series race the day before, caused the tire rim to dig into the infield grass. The car flipped over three times, kicked up a lot of dirt, and came to a stop on its roof. A temporary delay under a long caution (although the race was not red-flagged) ensued as emergency crews debated whether or not to upright Waltrip's car before extricating him. The situation was exacerbated due to Waltrip's size.

Jeff Gordon led the field at the lap 81 restart. From laps, 81 to 200 were run caution-free. The main competitors during the second half of the race still were Stewart and Earnhardt Jr., who combined led 101 of the final 120 laps. They were the two strongest cars of the day, as they led for more than 156 laps (98 by Stewart and 56 by Earnhardt Jr.). When the leaders pitted at lap 137, Sauter (who was five laps down after damage to his car from the lap 71 crash) tried to pit with them but had evident braking issues. He had to swerve to miss Kurt Busch (who was one lap down after contact with Earnhardt Jr. earlier in the race punctured a tire) and flew through the pitlane at over 100 mph. Wisely, he did not attempt to stop in his pit box and came around the track to try again. His speeding penalty dropped him further back. During the final round of green-flag pit stops with approximately 30 laps to go, Biffle tried to gain ground on the leaders at the pit entry but was quite evidently faster than the pack of cars running at pit lane speed. He dropped behind them prior to pitting, but his speeding penalty dropped him out of the Top 10 and from contention for the win.

When the final green-flag pit stops were over, rookie Scott Wimmer of Bill Davis Racing was out in front. The crew had only changed right-side tires, elevating him from a likely seventh or eighth-place finish to a chance to win. Unfortunately, he had no drafting partner and was caught up by the faster Stewart and Earnhardt Jr. with 25 laps to go. Earnhardt Jr. passed Stewart on lap 181 and held him off in the remaining laps to win his first Daytona 500. Earnhardt Jr. won the race exactly three years after his father's fatal crash on the final lap of the 2001 race, where Waltrip had won his first race which itself came three years after Earnhardt's win in the 1998 race.

== Results ==
Pos	Grid	Car No.	Driver	Team	Manufacturer	Laps	Laps Led	Status
1	3	8	Dale Earnhardt Jr.	Dale Earnhardt, Inc.	Chevrolet	200	56	Winning
2	5	20	Tony Stewart	Joe Gibbs Racing	Chevrolet	200	98	Running
3	26	22	Scott Wimmer (R)	Bill Davis Racing	Dodge	200	5	Running
4	10	29	Kevin Harvick	Richard Childress Racing	Chevrolet	200	6	Running
5	6	48	Jimmie Johnson	Hendrick Motorsports	Chevrolet	200	16	Running
6	14	01	Joe Nemechek	MBV Motorsports	Chevrolet	200	0	Running
7	2	38	Elliott Sadler	Robert Yates Racing	Ford	200	0	Running
8	39	24	Jeff Gordon (W)	Hendrick Motorsports	Chevrolet	200	8	Running
9	12	17	Matt Kenseth	Roush Racing	Ford	200	2	Running
10	31	88	Dale Jarrett (W)	Robert Yates Racing	Ford	200	0	Running
11	13	18	Bobby Labonte	Joe Gibbs Racing	Chevrolet	200	0	Running
12	1	16	Greg Biffle	Roush Racing	Ford	200	0	Running
13	29	1	John Andretti	Dale Earnhardt, Inc.	Chevrolet	200	1	Running
14	25	41	Casey Mears	Chip Ganassi Racing	Dodge	200	0	Running
15	23	23	Dave Blaney	Bill Davis Racing	Dodge	200	0	Running
16	15	97	Kurt Busch	Roush Racing	Ford	199	0	Flagged
17	19	0	Ward Burton (W)	Haas CNC Racing	Chevrolet	199	0	Flagged
18	16	21	Ricky Rudd	Wood Brothers Racing	Ford	199	0	Flagged
19	17	77	Brendan Gaughan (R)	Penske-Jasper Racing	Dodge	199	0	Flagged
20	38	5	Terry Labonte	Hendrick Motorsports	Chevrolet	199	1	Flagged
21	33	45	Kyle Petty	Petty Enterprises	Dodge	199	5	Flagged
22	43	33	Mike Skinner	Richard Childress Racing	Chevrolet	198	0	Flagged
23	28	32	Ricky Craven	PPI Motorsports	Chevrolet	198	0	Flagged
24	40	7	Jimmy Spencer	Ultra Motorsports	Dodge	198	0	Flagged
25	22	19	Jeremy Mayfield	Evernham Motorsports	Dodge	195	0	Flagged
26	21	30	Johnny Sauter (R)	Richard Childress Racing	Chevrolet	193	0	Flagged
27	24	09	Johnny Benson	Phoenix Racing	Dodge	177	0	Contact BS
28	41	14	Larry Foyt (R)	A. J. Foyt Racing	Dodge	176	3	Flagged
29	18	2	Rusty Wallace	Penske Racing	Dodge	171	0	Flagged
30	42	50	Derrike Cope (W)	Arnold Motorsports	Dodge	153	0	Flagged
31	20	12	Ryan Newman	Penske Racing	Dodge	149	0	Flagged
32	32	4	Kevin Lepage	Morgan-McClure Motorsports	Chevrolet	132	0	Flagged
33	34	43	Jeff Green	Petty Enterprises	Dodge	110	0	Contact BS
34	36	10	Scott Riggs (R)	MBV Motorsports	Chevrolet	109	0	Contact BS
35	30	31	Robby Gordon	Richard Childress Racing	Chevrolet	78	0	Contact BS
36	7	42	Jamie McMurray	Chip Ganassi Racing	Dodge	75	0	Contact BS
37	4	40	Sterling Marlin (W)	Chip Ganassi Racing	Dodge	75	0	Contact BS
38	9	15	Michael Waltrip (W)	Dale Earnhardt, Inc.	Chevrolet	70	0	Contact BS
39	35	25	Brian Vickers (R)	Hendrick Motorsports	Chevrolet	70	0	Contact BS
40	37	49	Ken Schrader	BAM Racing	Dodge	59	0	Contact BS
41	27	9	Kasey Kahne (R)	Evernham Motorsports	Dodge	42	0	Engine
42	11	99	Jeff Burton	Roush Racing	Ford	25	0	Engine
43	8	6	Mark Martin	Roush Racing	Ford	5	0	Engine
Failed to Qualify
44		72	Kirk Shelmerdine (R)	Kirk Shelmerdine Racing	Ford			
45		90	Andy Hillenburg	Donlavey Racing	Ford			
WD		95	Andy Belmont	Sadler Brothers Racing	Ford			

== Stat Wrap ==
- Time of the Race: 3 hours, 11 minutes, 53 seconds (22 minutes, 58 seconds longer than Buddy Baker's 1980 record)
- Average Speed: 172.284 mph (Baker's record: 177.602 mph)
- Cautions: 4 for 23 laps
1. Laps 8-11 (oil from Martin's blown engine)
2. Laps 34-38 (Cope, Riggs turn 4 crash)
3. Laps 60-64 (Green, Schrader, Wallace backstretch crash)
4. Laps 72-80 (Andretti, Benson Jr.; R. Gordon, T. Labonte, Lepage, Marlin, McMurray, Newman, Riggs, Sauter, Vickers, Waltrip backstretch crash).
- Lead Changes: 26 among 10 drivers;
  - Dale Earnhardt Jr. (1-29)
  - Kevin Harvick (30–35)
  - Tony Stewart (36–39)
  - Jimmie Johnson (40–41)
  - Tony Stewart (42–43)
  - Jimmie Johnson (44–52)
  - Dale Earnhardt Jr. (53–58)
  - Tony Stewart (59)
  - Dale Earnhardt Jr. (60)
  - Tony Stewart (61–71)
  - Dale Earnhardt Jr. (72)
  - Kyle Petty (73–77)
  - Jeff Gordon (78–84)
  - Tony Stewart (85–104)
  - Jimmie Johnson (105–107)
  - Matt Kenseth (108)
  - John Andretti (109)
  - Tony Stewart (110–136)
  - Jeff Gordon (137)
  - Matt Kenseth (138)
  - Jimmie Johnson (139)
  - Terry Labonte (140)
  - Tony Stewart (141–168)
  - Dale Earnhardt Jr. (169)
  - Jimmie Johnson (170)
  - Scott Wimmer* (171–175)
  - Tony Stewart (176–180)
  - Dale Earnhardt Jr. (181–200).
- Led the Most Laps: Tony Stewart, 98 of 200 laps
- Cars running at the finish: 31
- Rookie of the race: Scott Wimmer
- Dale Earnhardt Jr.'s win was the third Daytona 500 win for DEI, after Michael Waltrip's wins in 2001 and 2003. Overall, it was DEI's fifth Daytona race victory, counting Waltrip and Earnhardt Jr.'s Pepsi 400 victories.
- For the third year in a row, the pole sitter, Greg Biffle, did not lead a lap.
- Nextel Cup debuts: Brendan Gaughan, Kasey Kahne, and Scott Riggs.
- Only Daytona 500 appearances: Larry Foyt.
- Final Daytona 500 appearances: Johnny Benson, 2002 race winner Ward Burton, Ricky Craven, and Jimmy Spencer.

Previous race: 2003 Ford 400	Nextel Cup Series; 2004 season	Next race: 2004 Subway 400
