= Kirk Shelmerdine =

American racing driver (born 1958)

- Born: Edward Kirk Shelmerdine V March 8, 1958 (age 68); Philadelphia, Pennsylvania, U.S.
- Achievements: 1986, 1987, 1990, 1991 Winston Cup Series Champion (Crew Chief)
- Awards: NASCAR Hall of Fame (2023)

NASCAR Cup Series career
- 26 races run over 6 years
- Best finish: 47th (2004)
- First race: 1981 Budweiser NASCAR 400 (College Station)
- Last race: 2006 Pepsi 400 (Daytona)
Wins	Top tens	Poles
0	0	0

NASCAR O'Reilly Auto Parts Series career
- 13 races run over 4 years
- Best finish: 49th (1995)
- First race: 1994 Goody's 300 (Daytona)
- Last race: 2008 Camping World 300 (Daytona)
Wins	Top tens	Poles
0	0	0

NASCAR FedEx Freight Truck Series career
- 2 races run over 2 years
- Best finish: 79th (1995)
- First race: 1995 Pizza Plus 150 (Bristol)
- Last race: 1997 Virginia Is For Lovers 200 (Richmond)
Wins	Top tens	Poles
0	0	0
- Statistics up to date as of February 25, 2006.

Edward Kirk Shelmerdine V (born March 8, 1958) is an American former stock car racing driver and former championship-winning crew chief for Dale Earnhardt.

== Crew chief ==
Shelmerdine spent his early NASCAR career as an engineer and crew chief for Hylton Engineering. In 1980, Shelmerdine joined Richard Childress Racing. He initially served as crew chief for owner/driver Richard Childress in 1980 & 1981 until Dale Earnhardt moved to the No. 3 car for the final eleven races of the season. In 1982 & 1983, Shelmerdine was the crew chief for Ricky Rudd. The duo recorded two wins, 13 top-five finishes, 27 top-ten finishes, and finishes ninth in the final points standings both years.

In 1984, Shelmerdine was named the crew chief for a returning Dale Earnhardt, who spent the previous two seasons with Bud Moore Engineering. Earnhardt had 44 wins, 124 top-five finishes, and 182 top-ten finishes with Shelmerdine en route to four championships in 1986, 1987, 1990 and 1991. The pit crew won four consecutive Pit Crew Titles over the next eight years. In 1992, he announced he was retiring from his crew chief duties, and embarked on a racing career on his own to pursue his dream of being a driver.

== Driving career begins ==
Shelmerdine started running in the ARCA series in 1993 where he has three career wins. He has since run in all the top levels in NASCAR. Shelmerdine has run a total of two Craftsman Truck Series races with a best finish of seventeenth at Bristol in 1995. He has also run twelve Busch Series races with a best finish of seventeenth in 1994 at Daytona for Levin Racing.

== Cup driving career ==
Shelmerdine's NASCAR Winston Cup Series career actually started in 1981 in a race at College Station (Texas World Speedway, where owner/driver James Hylton brought out a second car (No. 8) for Shelmerdine to drive. After two laps, he quit and finished 33rd of the 34 cars. His next start would come at Talladega Superspeedway in 1994 for Jimmy Means. Shelmerdine finished 26th in the No. 52 Ford. He started his own Cup team in 2002 and ran races at Talladega, Loudon and Pocono, but he was primarily a "field filler" driver.

2004 was a breakout year for Shelmerdine, as he attempted all 36 races as an owner, 32 as a driver. As team owner, he had other drivers fill in for him at selected tracks: Tom Hubert at Infineon and Watkins Glen, Brad Teague at the fall Bristol race, and Ted Christopher at the July Loudon race. Shelmerdine's best finish would be a 37th at Michigan while his car's best finish would be a 29th at Watkins Glen, with Hubert behind the wheel.

2005 was a step back. The team qualified for only three races (Infineon with Hubert, Loudon with Christopher, and Pocono with Shelmerdine). Shelmerdine finished 42nd in the Pocono race with heating conditions ending his day 192 laps short of the finish.

Shelmerdine started out 2006 on a better note. He was rolling his car on to his hauler after failing to qualify high enough in his qualifying race for the Daytona 500. A NASCAR official stopped him and informed him that he qualified for his first Daytona 500 by gaining the final spot with his qualifying speed. He finished in twentieth place on the lead lap, the best finish of his Cup career. His performance gained media attention as he said if he did not qualify, he'd sell his race team because he was extremely low on money. He was using a motor from Richard Childress (in exchange for a displaying a sponsorship decal). His tires had been donated by a family of Dale Earnhardt fans. He had no full-time pit crew, only his loyal teammates such as Phil Harris, J.V. Daniels and a few others.

Shelmerdine's plans for the rest of 2006 were limited, however, he did race at Talladega. He qualified 22nd and was having a good run when he wrecked early in the race. Shelmerdine finished fortieth. Since then, he has attempted to qualify for the Coca-Cola 600 but failed to make the race after a qualifying crash, his next appearance was at the Pepsi 400 at Daytona where he made the show but fell out early and finished 43rd.

On December 22, 2006, the Federal Election Commission sent an "admonishment letter" to Shelmerdine as a response to him for running with a Bush/Cheney decal on his car in 2004.

Shelmerdine drove the Richard Childress Racing No. 33 in the 2008 Daytona testing sessions and was to be entered in the 2008 Daytona 500. He attempted a number of races during the 2009 season after buying Toyotas from Bill Davis Racing. Shelmerdine used Tom Hubert for road courses and New England staple Ted Christopher for Loudon.

It was announced on August 26, 2010, that on September 14, 2010, the assets of Kirk Shelmerdine Racing were to be sold at Public Auction at the team's basis in Welcome, North Carolina. Shelmerdine stated the reason for the closure is lack of sponsorship and technology provided for independent teams.

== Personal life ==
Shelmerdine resides in Welcome, North Carolina, and is the father of two children.

== Motorsports career results ==
=== NASCAR ===
(key) (Bold – Pole position awarded by qualifying time. Italics – Pole position earned by points standings or practice time. * – Most laps led.)

==== Sprint Cup Series ====
NASCAR Sprint Cup Series results
Year	Team	No.	Make	1	2	3	4	5	6	7	8	9	10	11	12	13	14	15	16	17	18	19	20	21	22	23	24	25	26	27	28	29	30	31	32	33	34	35	36	NSCC	Pts	Ref
1981	Richard Childress Racing	8	Pontiac	RSD	DAY	RCH	CAR	ATL	BRI	NWS	DAR	MAR	TAL	NSV	DOV	CLT	TWS; 33	RSD	MCH	DAY	NSV	POC	TAL	MCH	BRI	DAR	RCH	DOV	MAR	NWS	CLT	CAR	ATL	RSD						NA	0	
1994	Jimmy Means Racing	52	Ford	DAY	CAR	RCH	ATL	DAR	BRI	NWS	MAR	TAL; 26	SON	CLT	DOV	POC	MCH	DAY	NHA	POC	TAL	IND	GLN	MCH	BRI	DAR	RCH	DOV	MAR	NWS										66th	85	
1994	Jimmy Means Racing	53	Chevy																												CLT; DNQ	CAR	PHO	ATL						66th	85	
2002	Hover Motorsports	80	Ford	DAY; DNQ	CAR	LVS	ATL	DAR	BRI	TEX	MAR	TAL	CAL	RCH	CLT	DOV	POC	MCH	SON	DAY																				73rd	77	
2002	Kirk Shelmerdine Racing	72	Ford																		CHI; DNQ													CLT; DNQ						73rd	77	
2002	Kirk Shelmerdine Racing	27	Ford																			NHA; 42	POC; 41	IND	GLN	MCH	BRI	DAR	RCH	NHA	DOV	KAN; DNQ	TAL		MAR; DNQ	ATL	CAR	PHO	HOM	73rd	77	
2003	Donlavey Racing	90	Ford	DAY; DNQ	CAR	LVS	ATL	DAR	BRI	TEX	TAL	MAR	CAL	RCH	CLT	DOV	POC	MCH	SON	DAY	CHI	NHA	POC	IND	GLN	MCH	BRI	DAR	RCH	NHA	DOV	TAL	KAN	CLT	MAR	ATL	PHO	CAR	HOM	NA	-	
2004	Kirk Shelmerdine Racing	72	Ford	DAY; DNQ	CAR; 42	LVS; 43	ATL; 40	DAR; 39	BRI; 41	TEX; 42	MAR; DNQ	TAL; DNQ	CAL; 42	RCH; DNQ	CLT; DNQ	DOV; 39	POC; 40	MCH; 43	SON	DAY; DNQ	CHI; DNQ	NHA	POC; 41	IND; DNQ	GLN	MCH; 37	BRI	CAL; DNQ	RCH; 41	NHA; 42	DOV; 40	TAL; DNQ	KAN; 43	CLT; DNQ	MAR; 40	ATL; DNQ	PHO; DNQ	DAR; 42	HOM; DNQ	47th	723	
2005	Kirk Shelmerdine Racing	27	Ford	DAY; DNQ	CAL; DNQ	LVS; DNQ	ATL; DNQ	BRI	MAR; DNQ	TEX	PHO	TAL	DAR	RCH; DNQ	CLT; DNQ	DOV; DNQ	POC; DNQ	MCH	SON	DAY	CHI	NHA	POC; 42	IND	GLN	MCH	BRI	CAL	RCH; DNQ	NHA; DNQ	DOV	TAL	KAN	CLT	MAR	ATL	TEX	PHO	HOM	84th	37	
2006	Kirk Shelmerdine Racing	27	Chevy	DAY; 20	CAL	LVS	ATL	BRI	MAR	TEX	PHO	TAL; 41	RCH	DAR	CLT; DNQ	DOV	POC	MCH	SON	DAY; 43	CHI	NHA	POC	IND	GLN	MCH	BRI	CAL	RCH	NHA	DOV	KAN	TAL; DNQ	CLT; DNQ	MAR	ATL; DNQ	TEX	PHO	HOM	58th	177	
2007	Kirk Shelmerdine Racing	27	Chevy	DAY; DNQ	CAL	LVS	ATL	BRI	MAR	TEX	PHO	TAL	RCH	DAR	CLT	DOV	POC	MCH	SON	NHA	DAY; DNQ	CHI	IND	POC	GLN	MCH	BRI	CAL	RCH	NHA	DOV	KAN	TAL	CLT; DNQ	MAR	ATL	TEX	PHO	HOM	73rd	0	
2009	Kirk Shelmerdine Racing	27	Toyota	DAY; DNQ	CAL	LVS	ATL	BRI	MAR	TEX	PHO	TAL	RCH	DAR	CLT	DOV	POC	MCH	SON	NHA	DAY	CHI	IND	POC	GLN	MCH	BRI	ATL	RCH	NHA	DOV	KAN	CAL	CLT	MAR	TAL	TEX	PHO	HOM	82nd	0	

===== Daytona 500 =====
Year	Team	Manufacturer	Start	Finish
2002	Hover Motorsports	Ford	DNQ	
2003	Donlavey Racing	Ford	DNQ	
2004	Kirk Shelmerdine Racing	Ford	DNQ	
2005	Kirk Shelmerdine Racing	Ford	DNQ	
2006	Kirk Shelmerdine Racing	Chevy	42	20
2007	Kirk Shelmerdine Racing	Chevy	DNQ	
2009	Kirk Shelmerdine Racing	Toyota	DNQ	

==== Nationwide Series ====
NASCAR Nationwide Series results
Year	Team	No.	Make	1	2	3	4	5	6	7	8	9	10	11	12	13	14	15	16	17	18	19	20	21	22	23	24	25	26	27	28	29	30	31	32	33	34	35	NNSC	Pts	Ref
1994	Levin Racing	19	Chevy	DAY; 17	CAR; 42	RCH; 18	ATL; 20	MAR	DAR	HCY	BRI	ROU	NHA	NZH	CLT	DOV	MYB	GLN	MLW	SBO	TAL	HCY	IRP	MCH	BRI	DAR	RCH	DOV	CLT	MAR	CAR								59th	361	
1995	Beverley Racing	25	Chevy	DAY; 41	CAR; 24	RCH; 24	ATL; 19	NSV; 32	DAR; 24	BRI; 29	HCY	NHA	NZH	CLT	DOV	MYB	GLN	MLW	TAL	SBO	IRP	MCH	BRI	DAR	RCH	DOV	CLT	CAR	HOM										49th	562	
2002	Jay Robinson Racing	49	Ford	DAY; 31	CAR	LVS	DAR	BRI	TEX	NSH	TAL	CAL	RCH	NHA	NZH	CLT	DOV	NSH	KEN	MLW	DAY	CHI	GTY	PPR	IRP	MCH	BRI	DAR	RCH	DOV	KAN	CLT	MEM	ATL	CAR	PHO	HOM		110th	70	
2008	Jay Robinson Racing	28	Chevy	DAY; 30	CAL	LVS	ATL	BRI	NSH	TEX	PHO	MXC	TAL	RCH	DAR	CLT	DOV	NSH	KEN	MLW	NHA	DAY	CHI	GTY	IRP	CGV	GLN	MCH	BRI	CAL	RCH	DOV	KAN	CLT	MEM	TEX	PHO	HOM	122nd	78	

==== Craftsman Truck Series ====
NASCAR Craftsman Truck Series results
Year	Team	No.	Make	1	2	3	4	5	6	7	8	9	10	11	12	13	14	15	16	17	18	19	20	21	22	23	24	25	26	27	NCTC	Pts	Ref
1995	AAG Racing	65	Chevy	PHO	TUS	SGS	MMR	POR	EVG	I70	LVL	BRI; 17	MLW	CNS	HPT	IRP	FLM	RCH	MAR	NWS	SON	MMR	PHO								79th	112	
1997	Kenneth Appling Racing	03	Chevy	WDW	TUS	HOM	PHO	POR	EVG	I70	NHA	TEX	BRI	NZH	MLW	LVL	CNS	HPT	IRP	FLM	NSV	GLN	RCH; 32	MAR; DNQ	SON	MMR	CAL	PHO	LVS		124th	71	
1998	Kenneth Appling Racing	03	Chevy	WDW; DNQ	HOM	PHO	POR	EVG	I70	GLN	TEX	BRI	MLW	NZH	CAL	PPR	IRP	NHA	FLM	NSV	HPT	LVL	RCH	MEM	GTY	MAR	SON	MMR	PHO	LVS	126th	25	

=== ARCA Re/Max Series ===
(key) (Bold – Pole position awarded by qualifying time. Italics – Pole position earned by points standings or practice time. * – Most laps led.)

ARCA Re/Max Series results
Year	Team	No.	Make	1	2	3	4	5	6	7	8	9	10	11	12	13	14	15	16	17	18	19	20	21	22	23	24	25	ARMC	Pts	Ref
1993	Kenneth Appling Racing	98	Olds	DAY; 3	FIF	TWS	TAL; 8	KIL	CMS	FRS	TOL	POC	MCH; 26	FRS	POC	KIL	ISF	DSF	TOL	SLM	WIN	**ATL**; 5							50th	-	
1994	Kenneth Appling Racing	98	Olds	DAY; 5	TAL	FIF	LVL	KIL	TOL	FRS	MCH; 29	DMS	POC	POC	KIL	FRS	INF	I70	ISF	DSF	TOL	SLM	WIN	ATL; 16					75th	690	
1996	Kenneth Appling Racing	98	Chevy	DAY	ATL	SLM	TAL	FIF	LVL	CLT; 4	CLT; 6	KIL	FRS	POC	MCH	FRS	TOL	POC	MCH	INF	SBS	ISF	DSF	KIL	SLM	WIN	CLT	ATL	119th	-	
1997	Kenneth Appling Racing	3	Chevy	DAY	ATL	SLM	CLT; 37	CLT; 7	POC	MCH; 30	SBS	TOL	KIL	FRS	MIN	POC	MCH	DSF	GTW	SLM	WIN	CLT; 3	TAL	ISF	ATL; 7				50th	-	
1998	Kenneth Appling Racing	3	Chevy	DAY; 15	ATL; 1	SLM	CLT; 2*	MEM	MCH; 7*	POC; 3	SBS	TOL	PPR	POC; 13	KIL	FRS	ISF	ATL; 26	DSF	SLM	TEX; 25	WIN	CLT; 15	TAL; 27	ATL; 9				15th	2175	
1999	Kenneth Appling Racing	3	Chevy	DAY; 10	ATL; 32	SLM	AND	CLT; 3	MCH; 30	POC; 16	TOL	SBS	BLN	POC; 7	KIL	FRS	FLM	ISF	WIN	DSF	SLM	CLT; 1*	TAL; 26	ATL; 41					28th	1260	
2000	Kenneth Appling Racing	3	Chevy	**DAY**; 5*	SLM; 10	AND; 23	CLT; 36	KIL; 19	FRS; 6	MCH; 17	POC; 34	TOL; 13	KEN; DNQ	BLN															15th	2340	
2000	Team CLR	57	Ford												POC; 16	WIN	ISF	KEN	DSF	SLM	CLT; 8	**TAL**; 3	ATL; 13						15th	2340	
2001	Team CLR	57	Ford	**DAY**; 4	NSH	WIN	SLM	GTY	KEN	CLT	KAN	MCH	POC	MEM	GLN	KEN	MCH	POC	NSH	ISF	CHI	DSF	SLM	TOL	BLN	CLT	TAL	ATL	105th	240	
2003	Hylton Motorsports	48	Ford	DAY	ATL	NSH	SLM	TOL	KEN	CLT	BLN	KAN	MCH	LER	POC	POC	NSH	ISF	WIN	DSF	CHI	SLM	TAL	CLT; 1*	SBO; DNQ				60th	510	
2008	Kirk Shelmerdine Racing	27	Chevy	DAY; 34	SLM	IOW	KAN	CAR	KEN	TOL	POC	MCH	CAY	KEN	BLN	POC	NSH	ISF	DSF	CHI	SLM	NJE	TAL	TOL					149th	60	
