= NASCAR on television in the 2020s =

On October 15, 2012, NASCAR and the Fox Sports Media Group (FSMG) announced a new $2.4 billion eight-year deal, a 30% increase from their previous deal. On July 23, 2013, NASCAR and the NBC Sports Group announced a new $4.4 billion ten-year deal. Ten days later on August 1, 2013, NASCAR and Fox extended and expanded their agreement, paying an additional $1.4 billion to do so, to complete NASCAR's new TV package through the 2024 season. NBC reportedly bid over 50% more than ESPN and Turner for their portion of the package, despite Turner and ESPN expressing interest about continuing their relationship with NASCAR.

== Year-by-year summary ==
=== 2020 ===
In 2020, NASCAR created a worldwide television feed for broadcasts outside the United States. International broadcasters include Nippon TV, TSN, Viaplay Sports, Fox Sports Australia, Ziggo Sport Totaal, Arena Sport, Abu Dhabi Sports, FOX Sports Mexico, and BandSports.

Also in 2020, due to the COVID-19 pandemic after the fourth race of the season Fox started using their Charlotte Studio to the maximum extent possible to avoid travel, ensure social distancing, and limit the number of staff onsite at races. The only on-air talent onsite was at most two pit reporters per race, all other talent was stationed at the Fox Studios in Charlotte.

Also due to the COVID-19 pandemic, the NBC team initially broadcast all races from the broadcast booth at Charlotte Motor Speedway with only 1-2 pit reporters onsite. Although NBC has a small studio in Charlotte for NASCAR America segments, the studio was deemed too small to be able to do race broadcasts and maintain social distancing. For the Indianapolis race weekend, Mike Tirico hosted from the track; Tirico lives close enough to Indianapolis he was able to drive to the track to host. For the final five races of the season (starting with the Charlotte Roval Race) the NBC on-air team resumed travel to race sites.

NASCAR America stopped airing when the pandemic began and has not yet returned to air. NBC has cited other conflicting live events as the reason the program has not returned to air; NBCSN aired the 2020 Stanley Cup playoffs throughout the show's timeslot in July and August.

On July 28, 2020, it was announced that Brad Daugherty would be an analyst for NASCAR on NBC from the first Michigan International Speedway race onwards. At the conclusion of the 2020 season, Krista Voda revealed on social media she would not be returning to NBC. Voda stated NBC had elected to eliminate her position from race broadcasts.

=== 2021 ===
On January 22, 2021, an internal memo sent by NBC Sports president Pete Bevacqua announced that NBCSN would cease operations by the end of the year, and that USA Network would begin "carrying and/or simulcasting certain NBC Sports programming," including the Stanley Cup playoffs and NASCAR races, before NBCSN's shutdown. Peacock, NBCUniversal's new streaming service, will also carry some of the network's former programming starting in 2022. The move was cited by industry analysts as a response to the impact of the COVID-19 pandemic on the sports and television industries, the acceleration of cord-cutting, as well as formidable competition from rival sports networks such as ESPN and Fox Sports 1.

During Summer Olympic years (three during the contract, in 2016, 2020, and 2024), NBC will assign different NBCUniversal channels to air races as a result of scheduling conflicts. In 2021, the Cup Series will take two weeks off to minimize any conflict with the Olympics; the Watkins Glen race will be run on the day of the Games' closing ceremony. The two Xfinity Series race that will take place during the Games (at Watkins Glen) will air on CNBC. If a NASCAR race is postponed to Monday and it conflicts with an English Premier League match, the race will move to USA (CNBC is also unavailable on weekdays due to its stock market coverage), though this has not happened yet as of the end of the 2020 season.

=== 2022 ===
After the 2021 season, Jeff Gordon left Fox to work for Hendrick Motorsports full-time as the team's Vice Chairman. (He had previously worked with the team during the second half of the Cup Series season when NBC was broadcasting the races, after spending his entire full-time career with them). Fox did not replace him with one permanent color commentator and instead filled his spot with rotating guest commentators as they do in the Xfinity, Truck and ARCA Series. Retired Cup Series driver Tony Stewart was the first guest color commentator and was in the booth for the Clash, the Daytona 500 and the race at COTA.

=== 2023 ===
In July 2023, broadcast network The CW signed a TV rights deal to broadcast the NASCAR Xfinity Series from 2025 to 2031 for an estimated $115 million annual fee.

In November 2023, NASCAR announced a television and streaming deal for the NASCAR Cup Series and NASCAR Truck Series from 2025 to 2031 for a $1.1 billion annual fee. Fox Sports and NBC Sports will distribute 14 Cup races each, with five and four races on their broadcast networks respectively. Fox Sports will continue to air early season spring races including the Daytona 500, while NBC will continue to show late-season fall races including the entire NASCAR Cup Series playoffs. Amazon Prime Video will stream five Cup races in the early summer, as well as practice and qualifying for the first half of the season except for the Clash, Daytona 500 and All-Star Race. TNT will show the remaining five Cup races in the late summer, which will also be streamed on the Bleacher Report Sports Add-On on Max. Practice and qualifying will air on TruTV and Max for the second half of the season. It was also announced that Fox Sports would continue its arrangement with the Truck series from the previous media deal.

=== 2024 ===
On February 29, 2024, The Athletic reported that Dale Earnhardt Jr., whose contract with NBC expired after the 2023 season, would reportedly be leaving NBC for Amazon and TNT's new NASCAR coverage in the next TV contract that starts in 2025.

On May 7, 2024, it was officially announced that Earnhardt Jr. would make the move from NASCAR on NBC to Amazon and TNT's new NASCAR coverage, presumably continuing as a color commentator.

On May 13, 2024, NASCAR announced that they would hold a mid-season bracket challenge for Cup Series teams that would take place during TNT's five races. The top 32 drivers from the three previous races who would be seeded in the bracket for the start of the tournament based on their finishes in those races. The driver who wins the bracket challenge will win $1,000,000.

== Races televised ==
=== Cup Series ===
==== 2020 ====
Date	Event (Track)	Network	Commentary		Pit Reporters
Date	Event (Track)	Network	Lap-by-lap	Color	Pit Reporters
February 9	Busch Clash (Daytona)	FS1	Mike Joy	Jeff Gordon	Michael Waltrip; Vince Welch; Matt Yocum
February 13	Bluegreen Vacations Duels (Daytona)	FS1	Mike Joy	Jeff Gordon	Jamie Little; Regan Smith; Vince Welch; Matt Yocum
February 16–17	Daytona 500	Fox	Mike Joy	Jeff Gordon	Jamie Little; Regan Smith; Vince Welch; Matt Yocum
February 23	Pennzoil 400 (Las Vegas)	Fox	Mike Joy	Jeff Gordon	Jamie Little; Regan Smith; Vince Welch; Matt Yocum
March 1	Auto Club 400 (Auto Club)	Fox	Mike Joy	Jeff Gordon	Jamie Little; Regan Smith; Vince Welch; Matt Yocum
March 8	FanShield 500 (Phoenix)	Fox	Mike Joy	Jeff Gordon	Jamie Little; Regan Smith; Vince Welch; Matt Yocum
May 17	The Real Heroes 400 (Darlington)	Fox	Mike Joy	Jeff Gordon	Regan Smith
May 20	Toyota 500 (Darlington	FS1	Mike Joy	Jeff Gordon	Matt Yocum
May 24	Coca-Cola 600 (Charlotte)	Fox	Mike Joy	Jeff Gordon	Jamie Little; Regan Smith
May 27	Alsco Uniforms 500 (Charlotte)	FS1	Mike Joy	Jeff Gordon	Vince Welch
May 31	Supermarket Heroes 500 (Bristol)	FS1	Mike Joy	Jeff Gordon	Matt Yocum
June 7	Folds of Honor QuikTrip 500 (Atlanta)	Fox	Mike Joy	Jeff Gordon	Jamie Little
June 10	Blu-Emu Maximum Pain Relief 500 (Martinsville)	FS1	Mike Joy	Jeff Gordon	Regan Smith
June 14	Dixie Vodka 400 (Homestead)	Fox	Mike Joy	Jeff Gordon	Matt Yocum
June 22	GEICO 500 (Talladega)	Fox	Mike Joy	Jeff Gordon	Jamie Little; Vince Welch
June 27	Pocono Organics 325 (Pocono)	Fox	Mike Joy	Jeff Gordon	Matt Yocum
June 28	Pocono 350 (Pocono)	FS1	Mike Joy	Jeff Gordon	Jamie Little
July 5	Brickyard 400 (Indianapolis)	NBC	Rick Allen	Jeff Burton; Steve Letarte; Dale Earnhardt Jr.	Marty Snider; Kelli Stavast
July 12	Quaker State 400 (Kentucky)	FS1	Mike Joy	Jeff Gordon	Jamie Little
July 15	All-Star Race (Bristol)	FS1	Mike Joy	Jeff Gordon	Regan Smith; Matt Yocum
July 19	O'Reilly Auto Parts 500 (Texas)	NBCSN	Rick Allen	Jeff Burton; Steve Letarte; Dale Earnhardt Jr.	Dave Burns; Marty Snider
July 23	Super Start Batteries 400 (Kansas)	NBCSN	Rick Allen	Jeff Burton; Steve Letarte; Dale Earnhardt Jr.	Parker Kligerman; Kelli Stavast
August 2	Foxwoods Resort Casino 301 (New Hampshire)	NBCSN	Rick Allen	Jeff Burton; Steve Letarte; Dale Earnhardt Jr.	Parker Kligerman; Marty Snider
August 8	FireKeepers Casino 400 (Michigan)	NBCSN	Rick Allen	Jeff Burton; Steve Letarte; Dale Earnhardt Jr.	Marty Snider; Kelli Stavast
August 9	Consumers Energy 400 (Michigan)	NBCSN	Rick Allen	Jeff Burton; Steve Letarte; Dale Earnhardt Jr.	Marty Snider; Kelli Stavast
August 16	Go Bowling 235 (Daytona Road Course)	NBC	Rick Allen	Jeff Burton; Steve Letarte; Dale Earnhardt Jr.	Dave Burns; Parker Kligerman; Dillon Welch
August 22	Dyrdene 311 Saturday (Dover)	NBCSN	Rick Allen	Jeff Burton; Steve Letarte; Dale Earnhardt Jr.	Dave Burns; Parker Kligerman; Dillon Welch
August 23	Drydene 311 Sunday (Dover)	NBCSN	Rick Allen	Jeff Burton; Steve Letarte; Dale Earnhardt Jr.	Dave Burns; Parker Kligerman; Dillon Welch
August 29	Coke Zero Sugar 400 (Daytona)	NBC	Rick Allen	Jeff Burton; Steve Letarte; Dale Earnhardt Jr.	Dave Burns; Parker Kligerman; Marty Snider
September 6	Cook Out Southern 500 (Darlington)	NBCSN	Rick Allen	Jeff Burton; Steve Letarte; Dale Earnhardt Jr. Dale Jarret; Kyle Petty	Dave Burns; Parker Kligerman; Marty Snider
September 12	Federated Auto Parts 400 (Richmond)	NBCSN	Rick Allen	Jeff Burton; Steve Letarte; Dale Earnhardt Jr.	Dave Burns; Parker Kligerman; Marty Snider
September 19	Bass Pro Shops NRA Night Race (Bristol)	NBCSN	Rick Allen	Jeff Burton; Steve Letarte; Dale Earnhardt Jr.	Dave Burns; Marty Snider; Dillon Welch
September 27	South Point 400 (Las Vegas)	NBCSN	Rick Allen	Jeff Burton; Steve Letarte; Dale Earnhardt Jr. Brad Daugherty	Dave Burns; Marty Snider; Kelli Stavast
October 4	YellaWood 500 (Talladega)	NBC	Rick Allen	Jeff Burton; Steve Letarte; Dale Earnhardt Jr.	Dave Burns; Marty Snider; Kelli Stavast
October 11	Bank of America Roval 400 (Charlotte Roval)	NBC	Rick Allen	Jeff Burton; Steve Letarte; Dale Earnhardt Jr.	Dave Burns; Parker Kligerman; Dillon Welch
October 18	Hollywood Casino 400 (Kansas)	NBC	Rick Allen	Jeff Burton; Steve Letarte; Dale Earnhardt Jr.	Dave Burns; Parker Kligerman; Marty Snider
October 25	Autotrader EchoPark Automotive 500 (Texas)	NBCSN	Rick Allen	Jeff Burton; Steve Letarte; Dale Earnhardt Jr.	Dave Burns; Parker Kligerman; Marty Snider; Kelli Stavast
November 1	Xfinity 500 (Martinsville)	NBC	Rick Allen	Jeff Burton; Steve Letarte; Dale Earnhardt Jr.	Dave Burns; Parker Kligerman; Marty Snider
November 8	Season Finale 500 (Phoenix)	NBC	Rick Allen	Jeff Burton; Steve Letarte; Dale Earnhardt Jr.	Dave Burns; Parker Kligerman; Marty Snider; Kelli Stavast

==== 2021 ====
Date	Event (Track)	Network	Commentary		Pit Reporters
Date	Event (Track)	Network	Lap-by-lap	Color	Pit Reporters
February 9	Busch Clash (Daytona Road Course)	FS1	Mike Joy	Jeff Gordon; Clint Bowyer	Jamie Little; Regan Smith
February 11	Bluegreen Vacations Duels (Daytona)	FS1	Mike Joy	Jeff Gordon; Clint Bowyer	Jamie Little; Regan Smith
February 14–15	Daytona 500	Fox	Mike Joy	Jeff Gordon; Clint Bowyer	Jamie Little; Regan Smith; Vince Welch
February 21	O'Reilly Auto Parts 253 (Daytona Road Course)	Fox	Mike Joy	Jeff Gordon; Clint Bowyer	Jamie Little; Regan Smith
February 28	Dixie Vodka 400 (Homestead)	Fox	Mike Joy	Jeff Gordon; Clint Bowyer	Jamie Little; Regan Smith
March 7	Pennzoil 400 (Las Vegas)	Fox	Mike Joy	Jeff Gordon; Clint Bowyer	Jamie Little; Regan Smith
March 14	Instacart 500 (Phoenix)	Fox	Mike Joy	Jeff Gordon; Clint Bowyer	Jamie Little; Regan Smith
March 21	Folds of Honor QuikTrip 500 (Atlanta)	Fox	Mike Joy	Jeff Gordon; Clint Bowyer	Jamie Little; Regan Smith
March 29	Food City Dirt Race (Bristol)	Fox	Mike Joy	Jeff Gordon; Clint Bowyer	Jamie Little; Regan Smith; Vince Welch
April 10–11	Blue-Emu Maximum Pain Relief 500 (Martinsville)	FS1	Mike Joy	Jeff Gordon; Clint Bowyer	Jamie Little; Regan Smith
April 18	Toyota Owners 400 (Richmond)	Fox	Mike Joy	Jeff Gordon; Clint Bowyer	Jamie Little; Regan Smith
April 25	GEICO 500 (Talladega)	Fox	Mike Joy	Jeff Gordon; Clint Bowyer	Jamie Little; Regan Smith
May 2	Buschy McBusch Race 400 (Kansas)	FS1	Mike Joy	Jeff Gordon; Clint Bowyer	Jamie Little; Regan Smith
May 9	Goodyear 400 (Darlington)	FS1	Mike Joy	Jeff Gordon; Clint Bowyer	Jamie Little; Regan Smith
May 16	Drydene 400 (Dover)	FS1	Mike Joy	Jeff Gordon; Clint Bowyer	Jamie Little; Regan Smith
May 23	EchoPark Automotive Texas Grand Prix (COTA)	FS1	Mike Joy	Jeff Gordon; Clint Bowyer	Jamie Little; Regan Smith
May 30	Coca-Cola 600 (Charlotte)	Fox	Mike Joy	Jeff Gordon; Clint Bowyer	Jamie Little; Regan Smith; Vince Welch
June 6	Toyota/Save Mart 350 (Sonoma)	FS1	Mike Joy	Jeff Gordon; Clint Bowyer	Jamie Little; Regan Smith
June 13	NASCAR All-Star Race	FS1	Mike Joy	Jeff Gordon; Clint Bowyer	Jamie Little; Regan Smith
June 20	Ally 400 (Nashville)	NBCSN	Rick Allen	Jeff Burton; Steve Letarte; Dale Earnhardt Jr.	Parker Kligerman; Marty Snider; Kelli Stavast
June 26	Pocono Organics CBD 325 (Pocono)	NBCSN	Rick Allen	Jeff Burton; Steve Letarte; Dale Earnhardt Jr.	Dave Burns; Marty Snider; Kelli Stavast
June 27	Explore the Pocono Mountains 350 (Pocono)	NBCSN	Rick Allen	Jeff Burton; Steve Letarte; Dale Earnhardt Jr.	Dave Burns; Marty Snider; Kelli Stavast
July 4	Jockey Made in America 250 (Road America)	NBC	Rick Allen	Jeff Burton; Steve Letarte; Dale Earnhardt Jr.	Dave Burns; Parker Kligerman; Marty Snider
July 11	Quaker State 400 (Atlanta)	NBCSN	Rick Allen	Jeff Burton; Steve Letarte; Dale Earnhardt Jr.	Dave Burns; Marty Snider; Dillon Welch
July 18	Foxwoods Resort Casino 301 (New Hampshire)	NBCSN	Dale Earnhardt Jr.	Jeff Burton; Steve Letarte	Marty Snider; Dillon Welch
August 8	Go Bowling at The Glen (Watkins Glen)	NBCSN	Rick Allen	Jeff Burton; Steve Letarte; Dale Earnhardt Jr. Mike Bagley	Parker Kligerman; Dillon Welch
August 15	Verizon 200 at the Brickyard (Indianapolis Road Course)	NBC	Rick Allen	Jeff Burton; Steve Letarte; Dale Earnhardt Jr. Mike Bagley	Dave Burns; Marty Snider; Kelli Stavast
August 22	FireKeepers Casino 400 (Michigan)	NBCSN	Rick Allen	Jeff Burton; Steve Letarte; Dale Earnhardt Jr.	Dave Burns; Parker Kligerman; Marty Snider
August 28	Coke Zero Sugar 400 (Daytona)	NBC	Rick Allen	Jeff Burton; Steve Letarte; Dale Earnhardt Jr.	Dave Burns; Parker Kligerman; Marty Snider
September 5	Cook Out Southern 500 (Darlington)	NBCSN	Rick Allen	Jeff Burton; Steve Letarte; Dale Earnhardt Jr. Dale Jarrett; Kyle Petty	Dave Burns; Parker Kligerman; Marty Snider
September 11	Federated Auto Parts 400 (Richmond)	NBCSN	Rick Allen	Jeff Burton; Steve Letarte; Dale Earnhardt Jr.	Parker Kligerman; Marty Snider; Dillon Welch
September 18	Bass Pro Shops NRA Night Race (Bristol)	NBCSN	Rick Allen	Jeff Burton; Steve Letarte; Dale Earnhardt Jr.	Dave Burns; Marty Snider; Dillon Welch
September 26	South Point 400 (Las Vegas)	NBCSN	Rick Allen	Jeff Burton; Steve Letarte; Dale Earnhardt Jr.	Dave Burns; Kelli Stavast
October 4	YellaWood 500 (Talladega)	NBCSN	Rick Allen	Jeff Burton; Steve Letarte; Dale Earnhardt Jr.	Dave Burns; Parker Kligerman; Marty Snider; Kelli Stavast
October 10	Bank of America Roval 400 (Charlotte Roval)	NBC	Rick Allen	Jeff Burton; Steve Letarte; Dale Earnhardt Jr.	Dave Burns; Parker Kligerman; Marty Snider
October 17	Autotrader EchoPark Automotive 500 (Texas)	NBC	Rick Allen	Jeff Burton; Steve Letarte; Dale Earnhardt Jr.	Parker Kligerman; Marty Snider; Kelli Stavast
October 24	Hollywood Casino 400 (Kansas)	NBCSN	Rick Allen	Jeff Burton; Steve Letarte; Dale Earnhardt Jr.	Dave Burns; Marty Snider; Dillon Welch
October 31	Xfinity 500 (Martinsville)	NBC	Rick Allen	Jeff Burton; Steve Letarte; Dale Earnhardt Jr.	Dave Burns; Parker Kligerman; Marty Snider; Dillon Welch
November 7	Championship Race (Phoenix)	NBC	Rick Allen	Jeff Burton; Steve Letarte; Dale Earnhardt Jr.	Dave Burns; Parker Kligerman; Marty Snider; Kelli Stavast

==== 2022 ====
Date	Event (Track)	Network	Commentary		Pit Reporters
Date	Event (Track)	Network	Lap-by-lap	Color	Pit Reporters
February 6	Busch Light Clash (LA Coliseum)	Fox	Mike Joy	Clint Bowyer; Tony Stewart	Jamie Little; Regan Smith; Larry McReynolds
February 17	Bluegreen Vacations Duels (Daytona)	FS1	Mike Joy	Clint Bowyer; Larry McReynolds	Jamie Little; Regan Smith
February 20	Daytona 500	Fox	Mike Joy	Clint Bowyer; Tony Stewart	Jamie Little; Regan Smith; Vince Welch
February 27	WISE Power 400 (Auto Club)	Fox	Mike Joy	Clint Bowyer; Matt Kenseth	Jamie Little; Regan Smith
March 6	Pennzoil 400 (Las Vegas)	Fox	Mike Joy	Clint Bowyer; Danica Patrick	Jamie Little; Regan Smith
March 13	Ruoff Mortgage 500 (Phoenix)	Fox	Mike Joy	Clint Bowyer; Danica Patrick	Jamie Little; Regan Smith
March 20	Folds of Honor QuikTrip 500 (Atlanta)	Fox	Mike Joy	Clint Bowyer; Jeff Gordon	Jamie Little; Regan Smith
March 27	EchoPark Texas Grand Prix (COTA)	Fox	Mike Joy	Clint Bowyer; Tony Stewart	Jamie Little; Regan Smith
April 3	Toyota Owners 400 (Richmond)	Fox	Mike Joy	Clint Bowyer; Chad Knaus	Jamie Little; Regan Smith
April 9	Blue-Emu Maximum Pain Relief 400 (Martinsville)	FS1	Mike Joy	Clint Bowyer; Chad Knaus	Jamie Little; Regan Smith
April 17	Food City Dirt Race (Bristol)	Fox	Mike Joy	Clint Bowyer; Darrell Waltrip	Jamie Little; Regan Smith
April 24	GEICO 500 (Talladega)	Fox	Mike Joy	Clint Bowyer; Dale Earnhardt Jr.	Jamie Little; Regan Smith; Vince Welch
May 1–2	DuraMAX Drydene 400 (Dover)	FS1	Mike Joy	Clint Bowyer; Larry McReynolds	Jamie Little; Regan Smith
May 8	Goodyear 400 (Darlington)	FS1	Mike Joy	Clint Bowyer; Richard Petty (Stage 1); Bobby Labonte (Stage 2); Bill Elliott (Stage 3)	Jamie Little; Regan Smith
May 15	AdventHealth 400 (Kansas)	FS1	Mike Joy	Clint Bowyer; Jamie McMurray	Jamie Little; Regan Smith
May 22	All-Star Race (Texas)	FS1	Mike Joy	Clint Bowyer; Larry McReynolds; Frankie Muniz (Open)	Jamie Little; Regan Smith
May 29	Coca-Cola 600 (Charlotte)	Fox	Mike Joy	Clint Bowyer; Jamie McMurray	Jamie Little; Regan Smith; Vince Welch
June 5	Enjoy Illinois 300 (WWT Raceway)	FS1	Mike Joy	Clint Bowyer; Michael Waltrip; Kenny Wallace (Stage 2)	Jamie Little; Regan Smith
June 12	Toyota/Save Mart 350 (Sonoma)	FS1	Mike Joy	Larry McReynolds; Tony Stewart	Jamie Little; Regan Smith
June 26	Ally 400 (Nashville)	NBC; USA	Rick Allen	Jeff Burton; Steve Letarte; Dale Earnhardt Jr.	Dave Burns; Parker Kligerman; Marty Snider
July 3	Kwik Trip 250 (Road America)	USA	Rick Allen	Jeff Burton; Steve Letarte; Dale Earnhardt Jr.	Kim Coon; Parker Kligerman; Marty Snider
July 10	Quaker State 400 (Atlanta)	USA	Rick Allen	Jeff Burton; Steve Letarte; Dale Earnhardt Jr.	Dave Burns; Kim Coon; Marty Snider
July 17	Ambetter 301 (New Hampshire)	USA	Dale Earnhardt Jr.	Jeff Burton; Steve Letarte	Kim Coon; Parker Kligerman; Marty Snider
July 24	M&M's Fan Appreciation 400 (Pocono)	USA	Rick Allen	Jeff Burton; Steve Letarte; Dale Earnhardt Jr.	Kim Coon; Parker Kligerman; Marty Snider
July 31	Verizon 200 at the Brickyard (Indianapolis Road Course)	NBC	Rick Allen	Jeff Burton; Steve Letarte; Dale Earnhardt Jr.	Dave Burns; Parker Kligerman; Marty Snider
August 7	FireKeepers Casino 400 (Michigan)	USA	Dale Earnhardt Jr.	Jeff Burton; Steve Letarte	Kim Coon; Parker Kligerman; Marty Snider
August 14	Federated Auto Parts 400 (Richmond)	USA	Rick Allen	Jeff Burton; Steve Letarte; Dale Earnhardt Jr.	Dave Burns; Parker Kligerman; Marty Snider
August 21	Go Bowling at The Glen (Watkins Glen)	USA	Rick Allen	Steve Letarte; Mike Bagley; Dale Earnhardt Jr. Jeff Burton	Dave Burns; Parker Kligerman; Marty Snider
August 28	Coke Zero Sugar 400 (Daytona)	CNBC	Rick Allen	Jeff Burton; Steve Letarte; Dale Earnhardt Jr.	Dave Burns; Parker Kligerman; Marty Snider
September 4	Cook Out Southern 500 (Darlington)	USA	Rick Allen	Jeff Burton; Steve Letarte; Dale Earnhardt Jr. Dale Jarrett; Kyle Petty	Dave Burns; Kim Coon; Parker Kligerman; Marty Snider
September 11	Hollywood Casino 400 (Kansas)	USA	Rick Allen	Jeff Burton; Steve Letarte; Dale Earnhardt Jr.	Dave Burns; Kim Coon; Parker Kligerman
September 17	Bass Pro Shops Night Race (Bristol)	USA	Rick Allen	Jeff Burton; Steve Letarte; Dale Earnhardt Jr.	Dave Burns; Kim Coon; Marty Snider; Dillon Welch
September 25	Autotrader EchoPark Automotive 500 (Texas)	USA	Rick Allen	Jeff Burton; Steve Letarte; Dale Earnhardt Jr.	Kim Coon; Parker Kligerman; Marty Snider
October 2	YellaWood 500 (Talladega)	NBC	Rick Allen	Jeff Burton; Steve Letarte; Dale Earnhardt Jr.	Dave Burns; Kim Coon; Parker Kligerman; Marty Snider
October 9	Bank of America Roval 400 (Charlotte Roval)	NBC	Rick Allen	Jeff Burton; Steve Letarte; Dale Earnhardt Jr.	Dave Burns; Kim Coon; Marty Snider
October 16	South Point 400 (Las Vegas)	NBC	Rick Allen	Jeff Burton; Steve Letarte; Dale Earnhardt Jr.	Dave Burns; Parker Kligerman; Marty Snider
October 23	Dixie Vodka 400 (Homestead)	NBC	Rick Allen	Jeff Burton; Steve Letarte; Dale Earnhardt Jr.	Dave Burns; Kim Coon; Marty Snider
October 30	Xfinity 500 (Martinsville)	NBC	Rick Allen	Jeff Burton; Steve Letarte; Dale Earnhardt Jr.	Dave Burns; Parker Kligerman; Marty Snider; Dillon Welch
November 6	Championship Race (Phoenix)	NBC	Rick Allen	Jeff Burton; Dale Earnhardt Jr.	Dave Burns; Parker Kligerman; Marty Snider; Dillon Welch

==== 2023 ====
Date	Event (Track)	Network	Commentary		Pit Reporters
Date	Event (Track)	Network	Lap-by-lap	Color	Pit Reporters
February 5	Busch Light Clash (LA Coliseum)	Fox	Mike Joy	Clint Bowyer; Tony Stewart	Jamie Little; Regan Smith; Larry McReynolds
February 16	Bluegreen Vacations Duels (Daytona)	FS1	Mike Joy	Clint Bowyer; Tony Stewart	Jamie Little; Regan Smith
February 26	Pala Casino 400 (Auto Club)	Fox	Mike Joy	Clint Bowyer; Tony Stewart	Jamie Little; Regan Smith
March 5	Pennzoil 400 (Las Vegas)	Fox	Mike Joy	Clint Bowyer; Danica Patrick	Jamie Little; Regan Smith
March 12	United Rentals Work United 500 (Phoenix)	Fox	Mike Joy	Clint Bowyer; Danica Patrick	Jamie Little; Regan Smith
March 19	Ambetter Health 400 (Atlanta)	Fox	Mike Joy	Clint Bowyer; Tony Stewart	Jamie Little; Regan Smith
March 26	EchoPark Automotive Grand Prix (COTA)	Fox	Mike Joy	Clint Bowyer; Kurt Busch; Guenther Steiner; Chase Elliott	Jamie Little; Regan Smith
April 2	Toyota Owners 400 (Richmond)	Fox	Mike Joy	Clint Bowyer; Larry McReynolds	Jamie Little; Regan Smith
April 9	Food City Dirt Race (Bristol)	Fox	Mike Joy	Clint Bowyer; Tony Stewart	Jamie Little; Regan Smith; Josh Sims
April 16	NOCO 400 (Martinsville)	FS1	Mike Joy	Clint Bowyer; Bobby Labonte	Jamie Little; Regan Smith
April 23	GEICO 500 (Talladega)	Fox	Mike Joy	Clint Bowyer; Tony Stewart	Jamie Little; Josh Sims; Regan Smith
May 1	Würth 400 (Dover)	FS1	Mike Joy	Clint Bowyer; Rusty Wallace	Jamie Little; Regan Smith
May 7	AdventHealth 400 (Kansas)	FS1	Mike Joy	Clint Bowyer; Kurt Busch	Jamie Little; Josh Sims; Regan Smith
May 14	Goodyear 400 (Darlington)	FS1	Mike Joy	Clint Bowyer; Richard Petty (Stage 1); Kyle Petty (Stage 1); Carl Edwards (Stage 2); Bill Elliott (Stage 3)	Jamie Little; Josh Sims; Regan Smith
May 21	All-Star Race (North Wilkesboro)	FS1	Mike Joy	Clint Bowyer; Larry McReynolds; Darrell Waltrip (All-Star); Jamie McMurray (Open)	Jamie Little; Josh Sims; Regan Smith
May 29	Coca-Cola 600 (Charlotte)	Fox	Mike Joy	Clint Bowyer; Tony Stewart; Danny McBride (Stage 2)	Jamie Little; Josh Sims; Regan Smith
June 4	Enjoy Illinois 300 (WWT Raceway)	FS1	Mike Joy	Clint Bowyer; Michael Waltrip; Kenny Wallace (Stage 2)	Jamie Little; Regan Smith
June 11	Toyota/Save Mart 350 (Sonoma)	Fox	Mike Joy	Clint Bowyer; Jamie McMurray	Jamie Little; Regan Smith
June 25	Ally 400 (Nashville)	NBC	Rick Allen	Jeff Burton; Steve Letarte; Dale Earnhardt Jr.	Dave Burns; Kim Coon; Marty Snider
July 2	Grant Park 220 (Chicago Street Course)	NBC	Rick Allen	Steve Letarte; Mike Bagley; Jeff Burton; Dale Earnhardt Jr.	Dave Burns; Kim Coon; Parker Kligerman; Marty Snider
July 9	Quaker State 400 (Atlanta)	USA	Rick Allen	Jeff Burton; Steve Letarte; Dale Earnhardt Jr.	Dave Burns; Kim Coon; Marty Snider
July 17	Crayon 301 (New Hampshire)	USA	Rick Allen	Jeff Burton; Steve Letarte; Dale Earnhardt Jr.	Dave Burns; Kim Coon; Marty Snider
July 23	HighPoint.com 400 (Pocono)	USA	Rick Allen	Jeff Burton; Steve Letarte; Dale Earnhardt Jr.	Kim Coon; Parker Kligerman; Marty Snider
July 30	Cook Out 400 (Richmond)	USA	Rick Allen	Jeff Burton; Steve Letarte; Dale Earnhardt Jr.	Dave Burns; Marty Snider; Dillon Welch
August 6–7	FireKeepers Casino 400 (Michigan)	USA	Rick Allen	Jeff Burton; Steve Letarte; Dale Earnhardt Jr.	Kim Coon; Parker Kligerman; Marty Snider
August 13	Verizon 200 at the Brickyard (Indianapolis Road Course)	NBC	Rick Allen	Jeff Burton; Steve Letarte; Dale Earnhardt Jr.	Dave Burns; Kim Coon; Marty Snider
August 20	Go Bowling at The Glen (Watkins Glen)	USA	Rick Allen	Steve Letarte; Mike Bagley; Dale Earnhardt Jr. Jeff Burton	Kim Coon; Marty Snider; Dillon Welch
August 26	Coke Zero Sugar 400 (Daytona)	NBC	Rick Allen	Jeff Burton; Steve Letarte; Dale Earnhardt Jr.	Dave Burns; Parker Kligerman; Marty Snider
September 3	Cook Out Southern 500 (Darlington)	USA	Rick Allen	Jeff Burton; Steve Letarte; Dale Earnhardt Jr. Dale Jarrett; Kyle Petty	Dave Burns; Kim Coon; Marty Snider
September 10	Hollywood Casino 400 (Kansas)	USA	Rick Allen	Jeff Burton; Steve Letarte; Dale Earnhardt Jr.	Dave Burns; Kim Coon; Parker Kligerman
September 16	Bass Pro Shops Night Race (Bristol)	USA	Rick Allen	Jeff Burton; Steve Letarte; Dale Earnhardt Jr.	Dave Burns; Kim Coon; Marty Snider; Dillon Welch
September 24	Autotrader EchoPark Automotive 400 (Texas)	USA	Rick Allen	Jeff Burton; Steve Letarte; Dale Earnhardt Jr.	Dave Burns; Kim Coon; Marty Snider
October 1	YellaWood 500 (Talladega)	NBC	Rick Allen	Jeff Burton; Steve Letarte; Dale Earnhardt Jr.	Dave Burns; Kim Coon; Marty Snider; Dillon Welch
October 8	Bank of America Roval 400 (Charlotte Roval)	NBC	Rick Allen	Jeff Burton; Steve Letarte	Dave Burns; Kim Coon; Marty Snider
October 15	South Point 400 (Las Vegas)	NBC	Rick Allen	Jeff Burton; Steve Letarte; Dale Earnhardt Jr.	Dave Burns; Kim Coon; Marty Snider
October 22	4EVER 400 (Homestead)	NBC	Rick Allen	Jeff Burton; Steve Letarte; Dale Earnhardt Jr.	Dave Burns; Kim Coon; Marty Snider
October 29	Xfinity 500 (Martinsville)	NBC	Rick Allen	Jeff Burton; Steve Letarte; Dale Earnhardt Jr.	Dave Burns; Kim Coon; Parker Kligerman; Marty Snider
November 5	Championship Race (Phoenix)	NBC	Rick Allen	Jeff Burton; Steve Letarte; Dale Earnhardt Jr.	Dave Burns; Kim Coon; Parker Kligerman; Marty Snider

==== 2024 ====
Date	Event (Track)	Network	Commentary		Pit Reporters
Date	Event (Track)	Network	Lap-by-lap	Color	Pit Reporters
February 3	Busch Light Clash (LA Coliseum)	FS1	Mike Joy	Clint Bowyer; Kevin Harvick	Jamie Little; Regan Smith
February 15	Bluegreen Vacations Duels (Daytona)	FS1	Mike Joy	Clint Bowyer; Kevin Harvick	Jamie Little; Regan Smith; Josh Sims
February 19	Daytona 500	Fox	Mike Joy	Clint Bowyer; Kevin Harvick	Jamie Little; Regan Smith; Josh Sims
February 25	Ambetter Health 400 (Atlanta)	Fox	Mike Joy	Clint Bowyer; Kevin Harvick	Jamie Little; Regan Smith
March 3	Pennzoil 400 (Las Vegas)	Fox	Mike Joy	Clint Bowyer; Kevin Harvick	Jamie Little; Regan Smith
March 10	Shriners Children's 500 (Phoenix)	Fox	Mike Joy	Clint Bowyer; Kevin Harvick	Jamie Little; Regan Smith
March 17	Food City 500 (Bristol)	Fox	Mike Joy	Clint Bowyer; Kevin Harvick	Jamie Little; Regan Smith
March 24	EchoPark Automotive; Grand Prix (COTA)	Fox	Mike Joy	Clint Bowyer; Kevin Harvick	Jamie Little; Josh Sims; Regan Smith
March 31	Toyota Owners 400 (Richmond)	Fox	Mike Joy	Clint Bowyer; Kevin Harvick	Jamie Little; Regan Smith
April 7	Cook Out 400 (Martinsville)	FS1	Mike Joy	Clint Bowyer; Kevin Harvick	Jamie Little; Regan Smith
April 14	Autotrader EchoPark; Automotive 400 (Texas)	FS1	Mike Joy	Clint Bowyer; Kevin Harvick	Jamie Little; Regan Smith
April 21	GEICO 500 (Talladega)	Fox	Mike Joy	Clint Bowyer; Kevin Harvick	Jamie Little; Josh Sims; Regan Smith
April 28	Würth 400 (Dover)	FS1	Mike Joy	Clint Bowyer; Kevin Harvick	Jamie Little; Regan Smith
May 5	AdventHealth 400 (Kansas)	FS1	Mike Joy	Clint Bowyer; Kevin Harvick	Jamie Little; Regan Smith
May 12	Goodyear 400 (Darlington)	FS1	Mike Joy	Clint Bowyer; Kevin Harvick	Jamie Little; Regan Smith
May 19	All-Star Race (North Wilkesboro)	FS1	Mike Joy	Clint Bowyer; Kevin Harvick	Jamie Little; Regan Smith
May 26	Coca-Cola 600 (Charlotte)	Fox	Mike Joy	Clint Bowyer; Kevin Harvick	Jamie Little; Josh Sims; Regan Smith
June 2	Enjoy Illinois 300 (Gateway)	FS1	Mike Joy	Clint Bowyer; Kevin Harvick	Jamie Little; Regan Smith
June 9	Toyota/Save Mart 350 (Sonoma)	Fox	Mike Joy	Clint Bowyer; Kevin Harvick	Jamie Little; Josh Sims; Regan Smith
June 16	Iowa Corn 350	USA	Rick Allen	Jeff Burton; Steve Letarte	Dave Burns; Kim Coon; Marty Snider
June 23	USA Today 301 (New Hampshire)	USA	Rick Allen	Jeff Burton; Steve Letarte	Kim Coon; Parker Kligerman; Marty Snider
June 30	Ally 400 (Nashville)	NBC	Rick Allen	Jeff Burton; Steve Letarte	Dave Burns; Kim Coon; Marty Snider
July 7	Grant Park 165 (Chicago)	NBC	Rick Allen	Jeff Burton; Steve Letarte; Mike Bagley; Dillon Welch	Dave Burns; Kim Coon; Parker Kligerman; Marty Snider
July 14	The Great American; Getaway 400 (Pocono)	USA	Rick Allen	Jeff Burton; Steve Letarte	Kim Coon; Parker Kligerman; Marty Snider
July 21	Brickyard 400 (Indianapolis)	NBC	Rick Allen	Jeff Burton; Steve Letarte	Dave Burns; Kim Coon; Marty Snider
August 11	Cook Out 400 (Richmond)	USA	Rick Allen	Jeff Burton; Steve Letarte	Kim Coon; Marty Snider; Dillon Welch
August 18–19	FireKeepers Casino 400 (Michigan)	USA	Rick Allen	Jeff Burton; Steve Letarte	Dave Burns; Parker Kligerman; Marty Snider
August 24	Coke Zero Sugar 400 (Daytona)	NBC	Leigh Diffey	Jeff Burton; Steve Letarte	Dave Burns; Kim Coon; Parker Kligerman; Marty Snider
September 1	Cook Out Southern 500 (Darlington)	USA	Leigh Diffey	Jeff Burton; Steve Letarte	Dave Burns; Kim Coon; Marty Snider
September 8	Quaker State 400 (Atlanta)	USA	Leigh Diffey	Jeff Burton; Steve Letarte	Dave Burns; Kim Coon; Marty Snider
September 15	Go Bowling at The Glen	USA	Leigh Diffey	Jeff Burton; Steve Letarte; Mike Bagley; Dillon Welch	Kim Coon; Parker Kligerman; Marty Snider
September 21	Bass Pro Shops Night Race (Bristol)	USA	Leigh Diffey	Jeff Burton; Steve Letarte	Kim Coon; Parker Kligerman; Marty Snider; Dillon Welch

=== Xfinity Series ===
==== 2020 ====
Date	Event (Track)	Network	Commentary		Pit Reporters
Date	Event (Track)	Network	Lap-by-lap	Color	Pit Reporters
February 15	NACAR Racing Experience 300 (Daytona)	FS1	Adam Alexander	Clint Bowyer; Brad Keselowski	Regan Smith; Matt Yocum
February 22–23	Boyd Gaming 300 (Las Vegas)	FS1; FS2	Adam Alexander	Austin Dillon; Michael Waltrip	Jamie Little; Matt Yocum
February 29	Production Alliance Group 300 (Auto Club)	FS1	Adam Alexander	Joey Logano; Chad Knaus	Matt Yocum; Regan Smith
March 7	LS Tractor 200 (Phoenix)	FS1	Adam Alexander	Clint Bowyer; Joey Logano	Jamie Little; Vince Welch
May 21	Toyota 200 (Darlington)	FS1	Adam Alexander	Clint Bowyer; Michael Waltrip	Regan Smith
May 25	Alsco 300 (Charlotte)	FS1	Adam Alexander	Clint Bowyer; Jamie McMurray	Matt Yocum
June 1	Cheddar's 300 (Bristol)	FS1	Adam Alexander	Kurt Busch; Kyle Busch	Regan Smith
June 6	EchoPark 250 (Atlanta)	Fox	Adam Alexander	Clint Bowyer; Jamie McMurray	Jamie Little
June 13	Hooters 250 (Homestead)	Fox	Adam Alexander	Clint Bowyer; Jamie McMurray	Regan Smith
June 14	Contender Boats 250 (Homestead)	FS1	Adam Alexander	Jamie McMurray; Michael Waltrip	Regan Smith
June 20	Unhinged 300 (Talladega)	FS1	Adam Alexander	Aric Almirola; Jamie McMurray	Jamie Little; Vince Welch
June 28	Pocono Green 225 (Pocono)	FS1	Adam Alexander	Jamie McMurray; Regan Smith	Matt Yocum
July 4	Pennzoil 150 (Indianapolis Road Course)	NBC	Rick Allen	Jeff Burton; Steve Letarte; Dale Earnhardt Jr.	Marty Snider; Kelli Stavast
July 9	Shady Rays 200 (Kentucky)	FS1	Adam Alexander	Clint Bowyer; Chad Knaus	Jamie Little
July 10	Alsco 300 (Kentucky)	FS1	Adam Alexander	Clint Bowyer; Kurt Busch	Jamie Little
July 18	My Bariatric Solutions 300 (Texas)	NBCSN	Rick Allen	Jeff Burton; Steve Letarte; Dale Earnhardt Jr.	Dave Burns; Marty Snider
July 25	Kansas Lottery 250 (Kansas)	NBCSN	Rick Allen	Steve Letarte; Jeff Burton	Parker Kligerman; Kelli Stavast
August 8	Henry 180 (Road America)	NBCSN	Dave Burns	Jeff Burton; Dale Jarrett	Parker Kligerman
August 15	UNOH 188 (Daytona Road Course)	NBCSN	Rick Allen	Jeff Burton; Dale Earnhardt Jr. Steve Letarte	Dave Burns; Parker Kligerman; Dillon Welch
August 22	Drydene 200 (Dover)	NBCSN	Rick Allen	Dale Earnhardt Jr. Brad Daugherty	Dave Burns; Jesse Iwuji; Dillon Welch
August 23	Drydene 200 (Dover)	NBCSN	Steve Letarte	Jeff Burton; Dale Jarrett	Dave Burns; Jesse Iwuji; Dillon Welch
August 28	Wawa 250 (Daytona)	NBCSN	Rick Allen	Jeff Burton; Steve Letarte; Dale Earnhardt Jr.	Jesse Iwuji; Parker Kligerman; Marty Snider
September 5	Sport Clips Haircuts VFW 200 (Darlington)	NBC	Rick Allen	Steve Letarte; Dale Jarrett	Jeff Burton; Parker Kligerman; Marty Snider
September 11	Go Bowling 250 (Richmond)	NBCSN	Rick Allen	Steve Letarte; Brad Daugherty	Dave Burns; Parker Kligerman
September 12	Virginia Is For Racing Lovers 250 (Richmond)	NBCSN	Dale Earnhardt Jr.	Jeff Burton; Dale Jarrett	Parker Kligerman; Marty Snider
September 18	Food City 300 (Bristol)	NBCSN	Rick Allen	Jeff Burton; Kyle Petty; Dale Earnhardt Jr.	Dave Burns; Dillon Welch
September 26	Alsco 300 (Las Vegas)	NBCSN	Rick Allen	Steve Letarte; Jeff Burton; Dale Earnhardt Jr.	Jesse Iwuji; Marty Snider; Kelli Stavast
October 3	Ag-Pro 300 (Talladega)	NBCSN	Rick Allen	Jeff Burton; Steve Letarte; Dale Earnhardt Jr.	Marty Snider; Kelli Stavast
October 10	Drive for the Cure 250 (Charlotte Roval)	NBC	Rick Allen	Jeff Burton; Steve Letarte; Dale Earnhardt Jr.	Dave Burns; Jesse Iwuji; Dillon Welch
October 17	Kansas Lottery 300 (Kansas)	NBCSN	Rick Allen	Jeff Burton; Steve Letarte	Dave Burns; Parker Kligerman; Marty Snider
October 24	2020 O'Reilly Auto Parts 300 (Texas)	NBCSN	Rick Allen	Jeff Burton; Steve Letarte	Dave Burns; Parker Kligerman; Kelli Stavast
October 31	Draft Top 250 (Martinsville)	NBC	Rick Allen	Jeff Burton; Steve Letarte; Dale Earnhardt Jr.	Dave Burns; Parker Kligerman; Marty Snider
November 7	Desert Diamond Casino West Valley 200 (Phoenix)	NBCSN	Rick Allen	Jeff Burton; Steve Letarte	Dave Burns; Parker Kligerman; Marty Snider; Kelli Stavast

==== 2021 ====
Date	Event (Track)	Network	Commentary		Pit Reporters
Date	Event (Track)	Network	Lap-by-lap	Color	Pit Reporters
February 13	Beff. It's What's for Dinner. 300 (Daytona	FS1	Adam Alexander	Clint Bowyer; Tony Stewart	Regan Smith; Vince Welch
February 20	Super Start Batteries 188 (Daytona Road Course)	FS1	Adam Alexander	Drew Blickensderfer; Joey Logano	Jamie Little; Regan Smith
February 27	Contender Boats 250 (Homestead)	FS1	Adam Alexander	Kurt Busch; Joey Logano	Jamie Little; Regan Smith
March 6	Alsco Uniforms 300 (Las Vegas)	FS1	Adam Alexander	Joey Logano; Kurt Busch	Jamie Little; Regan Smith
March 13	Call 811 Before You Dig 200 (Phoenix)	FS1	Adam Alexander	Joey Logano; Daniel Suárez	Jamie Little; Regan Smith
March 20	EchoPark 250 (Atlanta)	FS1	Adam Alexander	Ryan Blaney; Tyler Reddick	Jamie Little; Regan Smith
April 9	Cook Out 250 (Martinsville)	FS1	Adam Alexander	Ryan Blaney; Austin Dillon	Jamie Little; Regan Smith
April 24	Ag-Pro 300 (Talladega)	Fox	Adam Alexander	Joey Logano; Tyler Reddick	Regan Smith; Vince Welch
May 8	Steakhouse Elite 200 (Darlington)	FS1	Adam Alexander	Bubba Wallace; Erik Jones	Jamie Little; Regan Smith
May 15	Drydene 200 (Dover)	FS1	Adam Alexander	Brad Keselowski; Kurt Busch	Jamie Little; Regan Smith
May 23	Pit Boss 250 (COTA)	FS1	Adam Alexander	Bubba Wallace; Ryan Blaney	Jamie Little; Regan Smith
May 29	Alsco Uniforms 300 (Charlotte)	FS1	Kevin Harvick	Joey Logano; Ryan Blaney	Christopher Bell; Erik Jones
June 5	B&L Transport 170 (Mid-Ohio)	FS1	Adam Alexander	Jamie McMurray; Michael Waltrip	Jamie Howe; Vince Welch
June 12	Alsco Uniforms 250 (Texas	FS1	Adam Alexander	Joey Logano; Brad Keselowski	Jamie Little; Regan Smith
June 19	Tennessee Lottery 250 (Nashville)	NBCSN	Rick Allen	Dale Earnhardt Jr. Jeff Burton; Steve Letarte	Parker Kligerman; Marty Snider; Kelli Stavast
June 24	Pocono Green 225 (Pocono)	NBCSN	Rick Allen	Dale Earnhardt Jr. Jeff Burton; Steve Letarte	Dave Burns; Marty Snider; Kelli Stavast
July 3	Henry 180 (Road America)	NBC	Rick Allen	Dale Earnhardt Jr. Jeff Burton; Steve Letarte	Dave Burns; Parker Kligerman; Marty Snider
July 10	Credit Karma Money 250 (Atlanta)	NBCSN	Rick Allen	Dale Earnhardt Jr. Jeff Burton; Steve Letarte	Dave Burns; Marty Snider; Dillon Welch
July 17	Ambetter Get Vaccinated 200 (New Hampshire)	NBCSN	Dale Earnhardt Jr.	Jeff Burton; Steve Letarte	Marty Snider; Dillon Welch
August 7	Skrewball Peanut Butter Whiskey 200 (Watkins Glen)	CNBC	Rick Allen	Steve Letarte; Mike Bagley; Dale Earnhardt Jr. Jeff Burton	Parker Kligerman; Dillon Welch
August 14	Pennzoil 150 (Indianapolis Road Course)	NBCSN	Rick Allen	Steve Letarte; Mike Bagley; Dale Earnhardt Jr. Jeff Burton	Dave Burns; Parker Kligerman
August 21	New Holland 250 (Michigan)	NBCSN	Dale Earnhardt Jr.	Steve Letarte; Jeff Burton	Dave Burns; Parker Kligerman; Marty Snider
August 27–28	Wawa 250 (Daytona)	NBCSN	Dale Earnhardt Jr.	Jeff Burton; Steve Letarte	Dave Burns; Parker Kligerman; Marty Snider
September 4	Sport Clips Haircuts VFW 200 (Darlington)	NBCSN	Rick Allen	Jeff Burton; Steve Letarte; Ricky Carmichael	Dave Burns; Parker Kligerman; Marty Snider
September 11	Go Bowling 250 (Richmond)	NBCSN	Rick Allen	Jeff Burton; Steve Letarte; Dale Jarrett	Parker Kligerman; Marty Snider; Dillon Welch
September 17	Food City 300 (Bristol)	NBCSN	Rick Allen	Dale Earnhardt Jr. Jeff Burton; Steve Letarte	Dave Burns; Marty Snider; Dillon Welch
September 25	Alsco Uniforms 302 (Las Vegas)	NBCSN	Rick Allen	Jeff Burton; Brad Daugherty	Dave Burns; Kelli Stavast
October 2	Sparks 300 (Talladega)	NBCSN	Dale Earnhardt Jr.	Steve Letarte; Jeff Burton	Dave Burns; Parker Kligerman; Marty Snider; Kelli Stavast
October 9	Drive for the Cure 250 (Charlotte Roval)	NBC	Rick Allen	Steve Letarte; Jeff Burton; Dale Earnhardt Jr.	Dave Burns; Parker Kligerman; Marty Snider
October 16	Andy's Frozen Custard 335 (Texas)	NBC	Rick Allen	Steve Letarte; Brad Daugherty	Parker Kligerman; Marty Snider; Kelli Stavast
October 23	Kansas Lottery 300 (Kansas)	NBC	Rick Allen	Steve Letarte; Jeff Burton; Dale Earnhardt Jr.	Dave Burns; Parker Kligerman; Marty Snider; Dillon Welch
October 30	Dead On Tools 250 (Martinsville)	NBCSN	Rick Allen	Steve Letarte; Jeff Burton; Dale Earnhardt Jr.	Dave Burns; Parker Kligerman; Marty Snider; Dillon Welch
November 6	Championship Race (Phoenix)	NBCSN	Rick Allen	Steve Letarte; Jeff Burton; Dale Earnhardt Jr.	Dave Burns; Parker Kligerman; Marty Snider; Kelli Stavast

==== 2022 ====
Date	Event (Track)	Network	Commentary		Pit Reporters
Date	Event (Track)	Network	Lap-by-lap	Color	Pit Reporters
February 19	Beef. It's What's for Dinner. 300 (Daytona)	FS1	Adam Alexander	Denny Hamlin; Chad Knaus	Regan Smith; Vince Welch
February 26	Production Alliance Group 300 (Auto Club)	FS1	Adam Alexander	Joey Logano; Ryan Blaney	Jamie Little; Regan Smith
March 5	Alsco Uniforms 300 (Las Vegas)	FS1	Adam Alexander	Joey Logano; Ryan Blaney	Jamie Little; Vince Welch
March 12	United Rentals 200 (Phoenix)	FS1	Adam Alexander	Joey Logano; Daniel Suárez	Jamie Little; Regan Smith
March 19	Nalley Cars 250 (Atlanta)	FS1	Adam Alexander	Joey Logano; Brad Keselowski	Jamie Little; Regan Smith
March 26	Pit Boss 250 (COTA)	FS1	Adam Alexander	Kurt Busch; Joey Logano	Jamie Little; Regan Smith
April 2	ToyotaCare 250 (Richmond)	FS1	Adam Alexander	Joey Logano; Daniel Suárez	Jamie Little; Regan Smith
April 8	Call 811 Before You Dig 250 (Martinsville)	FS1	Adam Alexander	Erik Jones; Austin Dillon	Jamie Little; Vince Welch
April 23	Ag-Pro 300 (Talladega)	Fox	Adam Alexander	Kurt Busch; Austin Dillon	Regan Smith; Vince Welch
April 30	A-GAME 200 (Dover)	FS1	Adam Alexander	Joey Logano; Brad Keselowski	Jamie Little; Regan Smith
May 7	Mahindra ROXOR 200 (Darlington)	FS1	Adam Alexander	Joey Logano; Ryan Blaney	Regan Smith; Vince Welch
May 21	SRS Distribution 250 (Texas)	FS1	Adam Alexander	Joey Logano; Kevin Harvick	Jamie Little; Josh Sims
May 28	Alsco Uniforms 300 (Charlotte)	FS1	Kevin Harvick	Joey Logano; Ryan Blaney	Austin Cindric; Tyler Reddick
June 4	Pacific Office Automation 147 (Portland)	FS1	Adam Alexander	Jamie McMurray; Trevor Bayne	Jamie Howe; Josh Sims
June 25	Tennessee Lottery 250 (Nashville)	USA	Rick Allen	Jeff Burton; Steve Letarte; Dale Earnhardt Jr.	Dave Burns; Parker Kligerman; Marty Snider
July 2	Henry 180 (Road America)	USA	Rick Allen	Jeff Burton; Steve Letarte	Kim Coon; Parker Kligerman
July 9	Alsco Uniforms 250 (Atlanta)	USA	Rick Allen	Jeff Burton; Steve Letarte; Dale Earnhardt Jr.	Dave Burns; Kim Coon; Marty Snider
July 16	Crayon 200 (New Hampshire)	USA	Rick Allen	Jeff Burton; Steve Letarte	Kim Coon; Marty Snider
July 23	Explore the Pocono Mountains 225 (Pocono)	USA	Rick Allen	Jeff Burton; Steve Letarte	Kim Coon; Parker Kligerman; Marty Snider
July 30	Pennzoil 150 (Indianapolis Road Course)	NBC; Peacock	Rick Allen	Jeff Burton; Steve Letarte; James Hinchcliffe	Dave Burns; Marty Snider
August 6	New Holland 250 (Michigan)	USA	Rick Allen	Steve Letarte; Brad Daugherty	Kim Coon; Parker Kligerman; Marty Snider
August 20	Sunoco Go Rewards 200 (Watkins Glen)	USA	Rick Allen	Steve Letarte; Mike Bagley; Dale Earnhardt Jr. Jeff Burton	Dave Burns; Parker Kligerman; Marty Snider
August 26–27	Wawa 250 (Daytona)	USA	Rick Allen	Jeff Burton; Steve Letarte; Dale Earnhardt Jr.	Dave Burns; Parker Kligerman; Marty Snider
September 3	Sport Clips Haircuts VFW 200 (Darlington)	USA	Dave Burns	Jeff Burton; Steve Letarte	Kim Coon; Parker Kligerman; Marty Snider
September 10	Kansas Lottery 300 (Kansas)	USA	Rick Allen	Jeff Burton; Steve Letarte; Dale Earnhardt Jr.	Dave Burns; Kim Coon; Parker Kligerman
September 16	Food City 300 (Bristol)	USA	Rick Allen	Jeff Burton; Steve Letarte; Dale Earnhardt Jr.	Dave Burns; Kim Coon; Marty Snider; Dillon Welch
September 24	Andy's Frozen Custard 300 (Texas)	USA	Rick Allen	Jeff Burton; Brad Daugherty	Parker Kligerman; Kim Coon; Marty Snider
October 1	Sparks 300 (Talladega)	USA	Rick Allen	Jeff Burton; Steve Letarte; Dale Earnhardt Jr.	Dave Burns; Kim Coon; Parker Kligerman; Marty Snider
October 8	Drive for the Cure 250 (Charlotte Road Course)	NBC; Peacock	Rick Allen	Jeff Burton; Steve Letarte	Dave Burns; Kim Coon; Marty Snider
October 15	Alsco Uniforms 302 (Las Vegas)	NBC; Peacock	Rick Allen	Jeff Burton; Steve Letarte; Dale Earnhardt Jr.	Dave Burns; Parker Kligerman; Marty Snider
October 22	Contender Boats 300 (Homestead)	USA	Rick Allen	Jeff Burton; Steve Letarte	Dave Burns; Kim Coon; Marty Snider
October 29	Dead On Tools 250 (Martinsville)	NBC; Peacock	Rick Allen	Jeff Burton; Steve Letarte; Dale Earnhardt Jr.	Dave Burns; Parker Kligerman; Marty Snider; Dillon Welch
November 5	Championship Race (Phoenix)	USA	Rick Allen	Jeff Burton; Steve Letarte	Dave Burns; Parker Kligerman; Marty Snider; Dillon Welch

==== 2023 ====
Date	Event (Track)	Network	Commentary		Pit Reporters
Date	Event (Track)	Network	Lap-by-lap	Color	Pit Reporters
February 18	Beef. It's What's for Dinner. 300 (Daytona)	FS1	Adam Alexander	Ryan Blaney; Austin Dillon; Coleman Pressley	Josh Sims; Regan Smith
February 26	Production Alliance Group 300 (Auto Club)	FS2	Adam Alexander	Joey Logano; Ryan Blaney	Josh Sims; Regan Smith
March 4	Alsco Uniforms 300 (Las Vegas)	FS1	Adam Alexander	Kevin Harvick; Ryan Blaney	Josh Sims; Regan Smith
March 11	United Rentals 200	FS1	Adam Alexander	Joey Logano; Kevin Harvick; Coleman Pressley	Josh Sims; Regan Smith
March 18	RAPTOR King of Tough 250 (Atlanta)	FS1	Adam Alexander	Joey Logano; Daniel Suárez	Josh Sims; Regan Smith
March 25	Pit Boss 250 (COTA)	FS1	Jamie Little	Michael Waltrip; Kevin Harvick	Heather DeBeaux; Jamie Howe
April 1	ToyotaCare 250 (Richmond)	FS1	Adam Alexander	Joey Logano; Kevin Harvick	Josh Sims; Regan Smith
April 15	Call 811.com Before You Dig 250 (Martinsville)	FS1	Adam Alexander	Joey Logano; Brad Keselowski; Coleman Pressley	Josh Sims; Regan Smith
April 22	Ag-Pro 300 (Talladega)	FS1	Adam Alexander	Joey Logano; Brad Keselowski; Coleman Pressley	Josh Sims; Regan Smith
April 29	A-GAME 200 (Dover)	FS1	Adam Alexander	Joey Logano; Austin Dillon	Josh Sims; Regan Smith
May 13	Shriners Children's 200 (Darlington)	Fox	Adam Alexander	Ryan Blaney; Erik Jones	Josh Sims; Regan Smith
May 29	Alsco Uniforms 300 (Charlotte)	FS1; FS2	Adam Alexander	Jamie McMurray; Michael Waltrip	Josh Sims; Regan Smith
June 3	Pacific Office Automation 147 (Portland	FS1	Adam Alexander	Jamie McMurray; Trevor Bayne	Jamie Howe; Josh Sims
June 10	DoorDash 250 (Sonoma)	FS1	Adam Alexander	Kevin Harvick; Austin Cindric	Josh Sims; Regan Smith
June 24	Tennessee Lottery 250 (Nashville)	USA	Rick Allen	Jeff Burton; Steve Letarte; Dale Earnhardt Jr.	Dave Burns; Kim Coon; Marty Snider
July 1–2	The Loop 121 (Chicago Street Course)	USA	Rick Allen	Steve Letarte; Dale Earnhardt Jr. Mike Bagley; Jeff Burton	Dave Burns; Kim Coon; Marty Snider
July 8	Alsco Uniforms 250 (Atlanta)	USA	Rick Allen	Jeff Burton; Steve Letarte; Dale Earnhardt Jr.	Dave Burns; Kim Coon; Marty Snider
July 15	Ambetter Health 200 (Atlanta)	USA	Rick Allen	Jeff Burton; Steve Letarte	Dave Burns; Kim Coon; Marty Snider
July 22	Explore the Pocono Mountains 225 (Pocono)	USA	Rick Allen	Dale Earnhardt Jr. Steve Letarte	Kim Coon; Marty Snider
July 29	Road America 180	NBC; Peacock	Dave Burns	Jeff Burton; Dale Jarrett	Kevin Lee; Matt Yocum
August 5	Cabo Wabo 250 (Michigan)	NBC; Peacock	Rick Allen	Jeff Burton; Dale Earnhardt Jr. Dale Jarrett	Kim Coon; Marty Snider
August 12	Pennzoil 150 (Indianapolis Road Course)	USA	Rick Allen	Jeff Burton; Steve Letarte; Dale Earnhardt Jr.	Dave Burns; Kim Coon; Marty Snider
August 19	Shriners Children's 200 (Watkins Glen)	USA	Rick Allen	Steve Letarte; Mike Bagley; Dale Earnhardt Jr. Jeff Burton	Kim Coon; Marty Snider; Dillon Welch
August 25	Wawa 250 (Daytona)	USA	Rick Allen	Jeff Burton; Steve Letarte; Dale Earnhardt Jr.	Dave Burns; Nate Ryan; Marty Snider
September 2	Sport Clips Haircuts VFW 200 (Darlington)	USA	Rick Allen	Jeff Burton; Steve Letarte; Dale Earnhardt Jr.	Dave Burns; Kim Coon; Marty Snider
September 9	Kansas Lottery 300 (Kansas)	NBC; Peacock	Rick Allen	Jeff Burton; Steve Letarte; Dale Earnhardt Jr.	Dave Burns; Kim Coon
September 15	Food City 300 (Bristol)	USA	Rick Allen	Jeff Burton; Steve Letarte	Dave Burns; Kim Coon; Marty Snider
September 23	Andy's Frozen Custard 300 (Texas)	USA	Rick Allen	Jeff Burton; Steve Letarte; Dale Earnhardt Jr.	Dave Burns; Kim Coon; Marty Snider
October 7	Drive for the Cure 250 (Charlotte Roval)	NBC; Peacock	Rick Allen	Jeff Burton; Steve Letarte; Dale Earnhardt Jr.	Dave Burns; Kim Coon; Marty Snider
October 14	Alsco Uniforms 302 (Las Vegas)	USA	Rick Allen	Jeff Burton; Steve Letarte; Dale Earnhardt Jr.	Dave Burns; Kim Coon; Marty Snider
October 21	Contender Boats 300 (Homestead)	USA	Rick Allen	Steve Letarte; Dale Jarrett	Dave Burns; Kim Coon; Marty Snider
October 28	Dead On Tools 250 (Martinsville)	USA	Rick Allen	Jeff Burton; Steve Letarte; Dale Earnhardt Jr.	Dave Burns; Kim Coon; Marty Snider
November 4	Championship Race (Phoenix)	USA	Rick Allen	Jeff Burton; Steve Letarte	Dave Burns; Kim Coon; Marty Snider

==== 2024 ====
Date	Event (Track)	Network	Commentary		Pit Reporters
Date	Event (Track)	Network	Lap-by-lap	Color	Pit Reporters
February 19	United Rentals 300 (Daytona)	FS1	Adam Alexander	Michael Waltrip	Josh Sims; Regan Smith
February 24	Raptor King of Tough 250 (Atlanta)	FS1	Adam Alexander	Joey Logano; Brad Keselowski	Josh Sims; Regan Smith
March 2	The LiUNA! (Las Vegas)	FS1	Adam Alexander	Joey Logano; Austin Cindric	Josh Sims; Regan Smith
March 9	Call811.com 200 (Phoenix)	FS1	Adam Alexander	Joey Logano; Daniel Suárez	Josh Sims; Regan Smith
March 23	Focused Health 250 (COTA)	FS1	Adam Alexander	Joey Logano; Daniel Suárez	Josh Sims; Regan Smith
March 30	ToyotaCare 250 (Richmond)	FS1	Adam Alexander	Joey Logano; Brad Keselowski	Josh Sims; Regan Smith
April 6	Dude Wipes 250 (Martinsville)	FS1	Adam Alexander	Ryan Blaney; Austin Cindric	Josh Sims; Regan Smith
April 13	Andy's Frozen Custard 300 (Texas)	FS1	Adam Alexander	Joey Logano; Ross Chastain	Josh Sims; Regan Smith
April 20	Ag-Pro 300 (Talladega)	Fox	Adam Alexander	Ryan Blaney; Daniel Suárez	Josh Sims; Regan Smith
April 27	BetRivers 200 (Dover)	FS1	Adam Alexander	Joey Logano; Ryan Blaney	Josh Sims; Regan Smith
May 11	Crown Royal Purple Bag Project 200 (Darlington)	FS1	Adam Alexander	Joey Logano; Brad Keselowski	Josh Sims; Regan Smith
May 25	BetMGM 300 (Charlotte)	Fox	Joey Logano	Ryan Blaney; Erik Jones	Josh Berry; Carson Hocevar
June 1	Pacific Office Automation 147 (Portland)	FS1	Adam Alexander	Jamie McMurray; Trevor Bayne	Amanda Busick; Josh Sims
June 8	Zip Buy Now, Pay Later 250 (Sonoma)	FS1	Adam Alexander	Joey Logano; Daniel Suárez	Josh Sims; Regan Smith
June 15	Hy-Vee PERKS 250 (Iowa)	USA	Rick Allen	Jeff Burton; Dale Jarrett	Dave Burns; Kim Coon
June 22	SciAps 200 (New Hampshire)	USA	Rick Allen	Jeff Burton; Steve Letarte	Kim Coon; Marty Snider
June 29	Tennessee Lottery 250 (Nashville)	USA	Rick Allen	Jeff Burton; Steve Letarte	Dave Burns; Kim Coon; Marty Snider
July 6	The Loop 110 (Chicago)	NBC	Rick Allen	Steve Letarte; Mike Bagley; Dillon Welch; Jeff Burton	Dave Burns; Kim Coon; Marty Snider
July 13	Explore the Pocono Mountains 225	USA	Rick Allen	Jeff Burton; Steve Letarte	Kim Coon; Marty Snider
July 20	Pennzoil 250 (Indianapolis)	USA	Rick Allen	Jeff Burton; Steve Letarte	Dave Burns; Kim Coon; Marty Snider
August 17	Cabo Wabo 250 (Michigan)	USA	Rick Allen	Jeff Burton; Steve Letarte	Dave Burns; Marty Snider
August 23	Wawa 250 (Daytona)	USA	Rick Allen	Jeff Burton; Steve Letarte	Dave Burns; Kim Coon; Marty Snider
August 31	Sport Clips Haircuts VFW 200 (Darlington)	USA	Rick Allen	Jeff Burton; Steve Letarte	Dave Burns; Kim Coon; Marty Snider
September 7	Focused Health 250 (Atlanta)	USA	Rick Allen	Jeff Burton; Steve Letarte	Dave Burns; Kim Coon; Marty Snider
September 14	Mission 200 (Watkins Glen)	USA	Rick Allen	Steve Letarte; Mike Bagley; Dillon Welch; Jeff Burton	Kim Coon; Marty Snider
September 20	Food City 300 (Bristol)	CW	Rick Allen	Jeff Burton; Steve Letarte	Kim Coon; Marty Snider; Dillon Welch
September 28	Kansas Lottery 300	CW	Rick Allen	Jeff Burton; Steve Letarte	Kim Coon; Marty Snider
October 5	United Rentals 250 (Talladega)	CW	Rick Allen	Jeff Burton; Steve Letarte	Dave Burns; Kim Coon; Marty Snider
October 12	Drive for the Cure 250 (Charlotte Roval)	CW	Rick Allen	Jeff Burton; Steve Letarte	Dave Burns; Kim Coon; Marty Snider
October 19	Ambetter Health 302 (Las Vegas)	CW	Rick Allen	Jeff Burton; Steve Letarte	Kim Coon; Marty Snider; Dillon Welch
October 26	Credit One NASCAR Amex; Credit Card 300 (Homestead)	CW	Rick Allen	Jeff Burton; Steve Letarte	Dave Burns; Kim Coon; Marty Snider
November 2	National Debt Relief 250 (Martinsville)	CW	Rick Allen	Jeff Burton; Steve Letarte	Dave Burns; Kim Coon; Marty Snider
November 9	Championship Race (Phoenix)	CW	Rick Allen	Jeff Burton; Steve Letarte	Dave Burns; Kim Coon; Marty Snider

=== Truck Series ===
==== 2020 ====
Date	Event (Track)	Network	Commentary		Pit Reporters
Date	Event (Track)	Network	Lap-by-lap	Color	Pit Reporters
February 14	NextEra Energy 250 (Daytona)	FS1	Vince Welch	Joey Logano; Michael Waltrip	Alan Cavanna; Jamie Little
February 21	Strat 200 (Las Vegas)	FS1	Vince Welch	Erik Jones; Michael Waltrip	Alan Cavanna; Regan Smith
May 26	North Carolina Education Lottery 200 (Charlotte)	FS1	Vince Welch	Michael Waltrip; Phil Parsons	Alan Cavanna
June 6	Vet Tix/Camping World 200 (Atlanta)	FS1	Vince Welch	Michael Waltrip; Todd Bodine	Alan Cavanna
June 13	Baptist Health 200 (Homestead)	FS1	Vince Welch	Michael Waltrip; Phil Parsons	Matt Yocum
June 28	Pocono Organics 150	FS1	Vince Welch	Michael Waltrip; Todd Bodine	Jamie Little
July 11	Buckle Up in Your Truck 225 (Kentucky)	FS1	Vince Welch	Michael Waltrip; Phil Parsons	Alan Cavanna
July 18	Vankor 350 (Texas)	FS1	Vince Welch	Michael Waltrip; Todd Bodine	Alan Cavanna
July 24	Blue-Emu Maximum Pain Relief 200 (Kansas)	FS1	Vince Welch	Michael Waltrip; Jamie McMurray	Alan Cavanna
July 25	E.P.T. 200 (Kansas)	FS1	Vince Welch	Michael Waltrip; Todd Bodine	Alan Cavanna
August 7	Henry Ford Health System 200 (Michigan)	FS1	Vince Welch	Michael Waltrip; Jamie McMurray	Alan Cavanna
August 16	Sunoco 159 (Daytona Road Course)	FS1	Vince Welch	Michael Waltrip; Jamie McMurray	Alan Cavanna
August 21	KDI Office Technology 200 (Dover)	FS1	Vince Welch	Michael Waltrip; Jamie McMurray	Alan Cavanna
August 30	CarShield 200 (Gateway)	FS1	Vince Welch	Michael Waltrip; Regan Smith	Alan Cavanna
September 6	South Carolina Education Lottery 200 (Darlington)	FS1	Vince Welch	Michael Waltrip; Regan Smith	Alan Cavanna; Matt Yocum
September 10	ToyotaCare 250 (Richmond)	FS1	Vince Welch	Michael Waltrip; Kurt Busch	Alan Cavanna; Jamie Little
September 17	UNOH 200 (Bristol)	FS1	Vince Welch	Michael Waltrip; Kurt Busch	Alan Cavanna; Regan Smith
September 25	World of Westgate 200 (Las Vegas)	FS1	Vince Welch	Michael Waltrip; Kurt Busch	Alan Cavanna
October 3	Chevrolet Silverado 250 (Talladega)	FS1	Vince Welch	Michael Waltrip; Kurt Busch	Alan Cavanna; Jamie Little
October 17	Clean Harbors 200 (Kansas)	Fox	Vince Welch	Michael Waltrip; Kurt Busch	Alan Cavanna
October 25	SpeedyCash.com 400 (Texas)	FS1	Vince Welch	Michael Waltrip; Jamie McMurray	Alan Cavanna
October 30	NASCAR Hall of Fame 200 (Martinsville)	FS1	Vince Welch	Michael Waltrip; Kurt Busch	Alan Cavanna
November 6	Lucas Oil 150 (Phoenix)	FS1	Vince Welch	Michael Waltrip; Kurt Busch	Alan Cavanna; Jamie Little

==== 2021 ====
Date	Event (Track)	Network	Commentary		Pit Reporters
Date	Event (Track)	Network	Lap-by-lap	Color	Pit Reporters
February 12	NextEra Energy 250 (Daytona)	FS1	Vince Welch	Michael Waltrip; Jamie McMurray	Jamie Howe; Regan Smith
February 19	BrakeBest Brake Pads 159 (Daytona Road Course)	FS1	Vince Welch	Michael Waltrip	Jamie Little; Regan Smith
March 5	Bucked Up 200 (Las Vegas)	FS1	Vince Welch	Michael Waltrip; Austin Dillon	Jamie Little; Regan Smith
March 20	Fr8Auctions 200 (Atlanta)	FS1	Vince Welch	Michael Waltrip; Ryan Blaney	Jamie Little; Regan Smith
March 29	Pinty's Truck Race on Dirt (Bristol)	FS1	Vince Welch	Michael Waltrip; Joey Logano	Jamie Little; Regan Smith
April 17	ToyotaCare 250 (Richmond)	FS1	Vince Welch	Michael Waltrip	Jamie Little; Regan Smith
May 1	WISE Power 200 (Kansas)	FS1	Vince Welch	Michael Waltrip; Joey Logano	Jamie Howe; Regan Smith
May 7	LiftKits4Less.com 200 (Darlington)	FS1	Vince Welch	Michael Waltrip	Jamie Little; Regan Smith
May 22	Toyota Tundra 225 (COTA)	FS1	Vince Welch	Michael Waltrip; Andy Lally	Jamie Little; Regan Smith
May 28	North Carolina Education Lottery 200 (Charlotte)	FS1	Vince Welch	Michael Waltrip	Jamie Howe; Regan Smith
June 12	SpeedyCash.com 220 (Texas)	FS1	Vince Welch	Joey Logano; Brad Keselowski	Jamie Little; Regan Smith
June 18	Rackley Roofing 200 (Nashville)	FS1	Vince Welch	Phil Parsons	Jamie Howe; Jamie Little
June 26	CRC Brakleen 150 (Pocono)	FS1	Vince Welch	Phil Parsons	Jamie Howe; Katie Osborne
July 9	Corn Belt 150 (Knoxville)	FS1	Vince Welch	Michael Waltrip	Jamie Howe; Jamie Little
August 7	United Rentals 176 (Watkins Glen	FS1	Vince Welch	Joey Logano; Michael Waltrip	Jamie Howe; Regan Smith
August 20	Toyota 200 (Gateway)	FS1	Vince Welch	Michael Waltrip; Kurt Busch	Jamie Howe; Regan Smith
September 4	In It To Win It 200 (Darlington)	FS1	Vince Welch	Michael Waltrip; Todd Bodine	Jamie Little; Josh Sims
September 16	UNOH 200 (Bristol)	FS1	Vince Welch	Michael Waltrip; Kurt Busch	Jamie Howe; Josh Sims; Regan Smith
September 24	Victoria's Voice Foundation 200 (Las Vegas)	FS1	Vince Welch	Michael Waltrip; Kurt Busch	Jamie Howe; Jamie Little
October 2	Chevrolet Silverado 250 (Talladega)	FS1	Vince Welch	Michael Waltrip; Kurt Busch	Jamie Howe; Jamie Little
October 30	United Rentals 200 (Martinsville)	FS1	Vince Welch	Michael Waltrip; Phil Parsons	Jamie Little; Josh Sims; Regan Smith
November 5	Lucas Oil 150 (Phoenix)	FS1	Vince Welch	Michael Waltrip; Phil Parsons	Jamie Little; Josh Sims; Regan Smith

==== 2022 ====
Date	Event (Track)	Network	Commentary		Pit Reporters
Date	Event (Track)	Network	Lap-by-lap	Color	Pit Reporters
February 18	NextEra Energy 250 (Daytona)	FS1	Vince Welch	Michael Waltrip; Kurt Busch	Jamie Howe; Josh Sims
March 4	Victoria's Voice Foundation 200 (Las Vegas)	FS1	Vince Welch	Michael Waltrip; Kurt Busch	Regan Smith; Josh Sims
March 19	Fr8 208 (Atlanta)	FS1	Vince Welch	Michael Waltrip; Phil Parsons	Jamie Howe; Josh Sims
March 26	XPEL 225 (COTA)	FS1	Vince Welch	Michael Waltrip; Andy Lally	Jamie Little; Josh Sims
April 7	Blue-Emu Maximum Pain Relief 200 (Martinsville)	FS1	Vince Welch	Michael Waltrip; Phil Parsons	Josh Sims; Regan Smith
April 16	Pinty's Truck Race on Dirt (Bristol)	FS1	Vince Welch	Michael Waltrip; Kurt Busch	Jamie Little; Josh Sims
May 6	Dead On Tools 200 (Darlington)	FS1	Vince Welch	Michael Waltrip; Phil Parsons	Jamie Little; Josh Sims
May 14	Heart of America 200 (Kansas)	FS1	Vince Welch	Michael Waltrip; Kurt Busch	Jamie Howe; Josh Sims
May 20	SpeedyCash.com 220 (Texas)	FS1	Vince Welch	Michael Waltrip; Phil Parsons	Jamie Little; Josh Sims
May 27	North Carolina Education Lottery 200 (Charlotte)	FS1	Vince Welch	Michael Waltrip; Kurt Busch	Josh Sims; Regan Smith
June 4	Toyota 200 (Gateway)	FS1	Vince Welch	Michael Waltrip; Kurt Busch	Jamie Little; Regan Smith
June 11	DoorDash 250 (Sonoma)	FS1	Vince Welch	Michael Waltrip; Andy Lally	Jamie Little; Josh Sims
June 18	Clean Harbors 150 (Knoxville)	FS1	Vince Welch	Phil Parsons; Trevor Bayne	Heather DeBeaux; Josh Sims
June 24	Rackley Roofing 200 (Nashville)	FS1	Vince Welch	Michael Waltrip; Phil Parsons	Josh Sims; Regan Smith
July 9	O'Reilly Auto Parts 150 (Mid-Ohio)	FS1	Vince Welch	Phil Parsons; Andy Lally	Jamie Howe; Josh Sims
July 23	CRC Brakleen 150 (Pocono)	Fox	Vince Welch	Phil Parsons; Trevor Bayne	Jamie Howe; Josh Sims
July 29	TSport 200 (IRP)	FS1	Vince Welch	Michael Waltrip; Phil Parsons	Jamie Howe; Josh Sims
August 13	Worldwide Express 250 (Richmond)	FS1	Vince Welch	Michael Waltrip; Phil Parsons	Josh Sims; Regan Smith
September 9	Kansas Lottery 200	FS1	Vince Welch	Michael Waltrip; Phil Parsons	Jamie Little; Josh Sims
September 15	UNOH 200 (Bristol)	FS1	Vince Welch	Michael Waltrip; Phil Parsons	Jamie Howe; Josh Sims
October 1	Chevrolet Silverado 250 (Talladega)	FS1	Vince Welch	Michael Waltrip; Phil Parsons	Jamie Little; Josh Sims
October 22	Baptist Health 200 (Homestead)	FS1	Vince Welch	Michael Waltrip; Phil Parsons	Josh Sims; Regan Smith
November 4	Lucas Oil 150 (Phoenix)	FS1	Vince Welch	Michael Waltrip; Phil Parsons	Jamie Howe; Jamie Little; Josh Sims

==== 2023 ====
Date	Event (Track)	Network	Commentary		Pit Reporters
Date	Event (Track)	Network	Lap-by-lap	Color	Pit Reporters
February 17	NextEra Energy 250 (Daytona)	FS1	Adam Alexander	Michael Waltrip; Phil Parsons	Amanda Busick; Jamie Howe; Regan Smith
March 3	Victoria's Voice Foundation 200 (Las Vegas)	FS1	Jamie Little	Michael Waltrip; Phil Parsons	Jamie Howe; Josh Sims
March 18	Fr8 208 (Atlanta)	FS1	Jamie Little	Michael Waltrip; Phil Parsons	Amanda Busick; Jamie Howe
March 25	XPEL 225 (COTA)	FS1	Adam Alexander	Joey Logano; Brad Keselowski	Josh Sims; Regan Smith
April 1	SpeedyCash.com 250 (Texas)	FS1	Jamie Little	Michael Waltrip; Phil Parsons	Heather DeBeaux; Jamie Howe
April 8	Weather Guard Truck Race (Bristol Dirt)	FS1	Adam Alexander	Michael Waltrip; Phil Parsons	Amanda Busick; Josh Sims
April 14	Long John Silver's 200 (Martinsville)	FS1	Jamie Little	Michael Waltrip; Phil Parsons	Heather DeBeaux; Jamie Howe
May 6	Heart of America 200 (Kansas)	FS1	Adam Alexander	Michael Waltrip; Kevin Harvick	Amanda Busick; Josh Sims
May 12	Buckle Up South Carolina 200 (Darlington)	FS1	Jamie Little	Michael Waltrip	Amanda Busick; Josh Sims
May 20	Tyson 250 (North Wilkesboro)	Fox	Adam Alexander	Michael Waltrip; Phil Parsons	Jamie Howe; Josh Sims
May 26	North Carolina Education Lottery 200 (Charlotte)	FS1	Adam Alexander	Michael Waltrip; Phil Parsons	Amanda Busick; Jamie Howe
June 3	Toyota 200 (Gateway)	FS1	Jamie Little	Michael Waltrip; Phil Parsons	Heather DeBeaux; Regan Smith
June 23	Rackley Roofing 200 (Nashville)	FS1	Adam Alexander	Michael Waltrip; Phil Parsons	Amanda Busick; Josh Sims
July 8	O'Reilly Auto Parts 150 (Mid-Ohio)	FS1	Jamie Little	Michael Waltrip; Phil Parsons	Amanda Busick; Jamie Howe
July 22	CRC Brakleen 150 (Pocono)	FS1	Adam Alexander	Michael Waltrip; Phil Parsons	Jamie Howe; Josh Sims
July 29	Worldwide Express 250 (Richmond)	FS1	Adam Alexander	Michael Waltrip; Phil Parsons	Heather DeBeaux; Josh Sims
August 11	TSport 200 (IRP)	FS1	Jamie Little	Michael Waltrip; Phil Parsons	Amanda Busick; Josh Sims
August 27	Clean Harbors 175 (Milwaukee)	FS1	Adam Alexander	Michael Waltrip; Phil Parsons	Amanda Busick; Josh Sims
September 8	Kansas Lottery 200 (Kansas)	FS1	Jamie Little	Michael Waltrip; Phil Parsons	Amanda Busick; Heather DeBeaux
September 14	UNOH 200 (Bristol)	FS1	Adam Alexander	Michael Waltrip; Phil Parsons	Amanda Busick; Jamie Howe
September 30	Love's RV Stop 250 (Talladega)	FS1	Jamie Little	Michael Waltrip; Phil Parsons	Josh Sims; Regan Smith
October 21	Baptist Health Cancer Care 200 (Homestead)	FS1	Jamie Little	Michael Waltrip; Phil Parsons	Josh Sims; Regan Smith
November 3–4	Craftsman 150 (Phoenix)	FS1	Jamie Little	Michael Waltrip; Phil Parsons	Amanda Busick; Josh Sims; Regan Smith

==== 2024 ====
Date	Event (Track)	Network	Commentary		Pit Reporters
Date	Event (Track)	Network	Lap-by-lap	Color	Pit Reporters
February 16	Fresh From Florida 250 (Daytona)	FS1	Adam Alexander	Michael Waltrip; Phil Parsons	Amanda Busick; Regan Smith
February 24	Fr8 208 (Atlanta)	FS1	Jamie Little	Michael Waltrip; Phil Parsons	Amanda Busick; Jamie Howe
March 1	Victoria's Voice Foundation 200 (Las Vegas)	FS1	Jamie Little	Michael Waltrip; Phil Parsons	Amanda Busick; Josh Sims
March 16	Weather Guard Truck Race (Bristol)	FS1	Adam Alexander	Michael Waltrip; Phil Parsons	Josh Sims; Regan Smith
March 23	XPEL 225 (COTA)	FS1	Jamie Little	Michael Waltrip; Phil Parsons	Amanda Busick; Jamie Howe
April 5	Long John Silver's 200 (Martinsville)	FS1	Jamie Little	Michael Waltrip; Phil Parsons	Jamie Howe; Josh Sims
April 12	SpeedyCash.com 250 (Texas)	FS1	Jamie Little	Michael Waltrip; Phil Parsons	Amanda Busick; Josh Sims
May 4	Heart of America 200 (Kansas)	FS1	Adam Alexander	Michael Waltrip; Phil Parsons	Jamie Howe; Josh Sims
May 10	Buckle Up South Carolina 200 (Darlington)	FS1	Jamie Little	Michael Waltrip; Phil Parsons	Amanda Busick; Jamie Howe
May 18	Wright Brand 250 (North Wilkesboro)	FS1	Adam Alexander	Michael Waltrip; Phil Parsons	Josh Sims; Regan Smith
May 24	North Carolina Education Lottery 200 (Charlotte)	FS1	Adam Alexander	Michael Waltrip; Phil Parsons; Carson Hocevar	Amanda Busick; Jamie Howe
June 1	Toyota 200 (Gateway)	FS2	Jamie Little	Joey Logano; Phil Parsons	Regan Smith; Michael Waltrip
June 28	Rackley Roofing 200 (Nashville)	FS2	Jamie Little	Phil Parsons	Amanda Busick; Michael Waltrip
July 12	CRC Brakleen 175 (Pocono)	FS1	Jamie Little	Michael Waltrip; Phil Parsons	Amanda Busick; Josh Sims
July 19	TSport 200 (IRP)	FS1	Adam Alexander	Michael Waltrip; Phil Parsons	Jamie Howe; Mamba Smith
August 10	Clean Harbors 250 (Richmond)	FS1	Jamie Little	Michael Waltrip; Phil Parsons	Amanda Busick; Josh Sims
August 25	LiUNA! 175 (Milwaukee)	FS1	Adam Alexander	Michael Waltrip; Phil Parsons	Heather DeBeaux; Jamie Howe
September 19	UNOH 200 (Bristol)	FS1	Adam Alexander	Michael Waltrip; Phil Parsons	Amanda Busick; Mamba Smith
September 27	Kubota Tractor 200 (Kansas)	FS1	Jamie Little	Michael Waltrip; Phil Parsons	Todd Bodine; Amanda Busick
October 4	Love's RV Stop 225 (Talladega)	FS1	Adam Alexander	Michael Waltrip; Phil Parsons	Mamba Smith; Regan Smith
October 26	Baptist Health 200 (Homestead)	FS1	Jamie Little	Michael Waltrip; Phil Parsons	Todd Bodine; Amanda Busick
November 1	Zip Buy Now, Pay Later 200 (Martinsville)	FS1	Jamie Little	Michael Waltrip; Phil Parsons	Amanda Busick; Regan Smith
November 8	Championship Race (Phoenix)	FS1	Adam Alexander	Michael Waltrip; Phil Parsons	Amanda Busick; Todd Bodine; Regan Smith

== See also ==
- List of NASCAR on Fox broadcasters
- List of NASCAR on NBC broadcasters
- List of Daytona 500 broadcasters
- List of NASCAR All-Star Race broadcasters
