= List of NASCAR on Fox broadcasters =

The following is a list of current and former broadcasters for NASCAR on Fox.

== Current commentators ==
=== NASCAR Cup Series ===
Fox's 2026 lineup of broadcasters for the Cup Series was as follows:

==== Booth announcers ====
- Mike Joy (play-by-play)
- Clint Bowyer (color commentator)
- Kevin Harvick (color commentator)
- Townsend Bell (Stage 2 at Phoenix only)
- James Hinchcliffe (Stage 2 at Phoenix only)
- Darrell Waltrip (Stage 1 at Darlington only)

==== Race Strategy, Technical and Rules analyst ====
- Larry McReynolds

==== Pit reporters ====
- Jamie Little
- Josh Sims
- Regan Smith

==== Pre-race show (at track) ====
- Chris Myers (host)
- Josh Sims (fill-in host)
- Clint Bowyer (analyst)
- Kevin Harvick (analyst)
- Jamie McMurray (analyst)
- Michael Waltrip (gridwalk)
- Tom Rinaldi (reporter, Daytona 500 only)

Notes:

- Myers only did the Daytona 500 in 2019 and 2020 before returning full-time at every race in 2021, which he previously did from 2001 to 2018.
- Tom Rinaldi has been a guest pre-race pit reporter for the Daytona 500 each year since 2021.
- Bryson Byrnes, an intern for NASCAR on Fox who is the son of deceased Fox pit reporter Steve Byrnes has guest pit reported on the pre-race show gridwalk for the last Cup Series race on Fox's schedule each year which is when the Byrnsie Award (in honor of his father) is presented.

Notes:

- McMurray also sporadically appears during the broadcast of each race as an in-race analyst from the NASCAR on Fox studio in Charlotte. Michael Waltrip had done this in past years before McMurray joined Fox (although Waltrip would be at the track in the studio with Chris Myers).
- The Charlotte studio was not used during the race weekend for the 2022 and 2023 Clash races. The pre-race show broadcasters (Spake, McReynolds and McMurray) went to the Los Angeles Memorial Coliseum in-person instead of broadcasting from the Charlotte studio. Additionally, McMurray went to the track for the Daytona 500 and McReynolds went to Daytona for the Duel races before returning to Charlotte for the rest of the race weekend.

=== NASCAR Craftsman Truck Series ===
Fox's 2026 lineup of broadcasters for the Truck Series is as follows. The race at Darlington was Fox's yearly Drivers Only broadcast.

==== Booth announcers ====
- Jamie Little (rotating play-by-play)
- Eric Brennan (rotating play-by-play)
- Brent Stover (rotating play by-play)
- Michael Waltrip (color commentator)
- Kevin Harvick (color commentator / rotating play–by–play)
- Townsend Bell (color commentator)
- Phil Parsons (color commentator)
- Regan Smith (color commentator)
- Rotation of Cup Series drivers and crew chiefs (color commentator for select races, see full list below)
  - Joey Logano (Daytona, Atlanta, Darlington, Texas, Nashville, Bristol)
  - Ryan Blaney (Atlanta, Darlington)
  - Austin Cindric (Bristol)
  - Austin Dillon (Watkins Glen)
  - Daniel Suárez (Dover)
  - Brad Keselowski (Bristol)
  - TBA (all other races}

==== Pit reporters ====
- Amanda Busick
- Josh Sims
- Regan Smith
- Georgia Henneberry (St. Petersburg)
- Hermie Sadler (Richmond)
- Austin Cindric (Darlington)
- Ricky Stenhouse Jr. (Darlington)

=== ARCA Menards Series ===
Fox's 2026 ARCA Series broadcaster lineup is as follows:

==== Booth announcers ====
- Eric Brennan (rotating play-by-play)
- Brent Stover (rotating play–by–play)
- Phil Parsons (color commentator)
- Trevor Bayne (color commentator)
- Rotation of Cup Series drivers and crew chiefs (color commentator for select races, see full list below)
  - Austin Cindric (Daytona, Kansas, Talladega, Watkins Glen)
  - Brenden Queen (Talladega)
  - TBA (all other races)

==== Pit reporters ====
- Amanda Busick
- Josh Sims
- Kaitlyn Vincie
- Alex Weaver
- Charlie Krall (select standalone races)

=== Spanish language (Fox Deportes) ===
- Tony Rivera (play-by-play)
- Jessi Losada (color commentator)
- Livette Ruvalcaba (pit reporter)

=== Other commentators ===
- Will Buxton (Speed with Harvick and Buxton co-host)
- Mamba Smith (Kevin Harvick's Happy Hour co-host)
- Bob Pockrass (social media)

== Former commentators ==
This is a list of former NASCAR on Fox broadcasters, their position(s), and the years they were each with the network.

Name	Years with Fox	Position(s) with Fox	Cause of departure/future position(s)
Steve Byrnes	2001–2015	Pit reporter, Cup (2001–2014) and Xfinity Series (2001–2006); Truck Series play-by-play (2014)	Died from cancer on April 21, 2015
Mark Garrow	2001–2006	Substitute play-by-play or pit reporter, some standalone Xfinity Series races	Now works as a color commentator for Performance Racing Network
Dick Berggren	2001–2012	Pit reporter	Retired from broadcasting after 2012 season
Ken Squier	2001	Studio analyst for 2001 Daytona 500/Speedweeks only	Formerly worked for NASCAR on CBS and NASCAR on TBS as play-by-play announcer and later studio host until 2000. He was a studio analyst for Fox only for the 2001 Daytona 500/Speedweeks before he retired from broadcasting. Died from a Blockage in 2023
Darrell Waltrip	2001–2019	Color commentator	Retired from broadcasting after the 2019 season. He did return to Fox as a guest color commentator for the Bristol dirt race in 2022 and the All-Star Race at North Wilkesboro in 2023.
Matt Yocum	2001–2020	Pit reporter (Cup, Xfinity and Truck Series)	In 2021, 2022 and 2023, he worked for CBS and ESPN as a pit reporter for the Superstar Racing Experience. He also was a substitute pit reporter for NBC in the 2023 Xfinity Series race at Road America and has pit reported for NBC's IMSA coverage.
Jeanne Zelasko	2001–2006	Pit reporter	Currently works for Bally Sports covering the Los Angeles Clippers
Chad Little	2002–2006	Substitute color commentator, some standalone Xfinity Series races	He went to work for NASCAR as Managing Director of the Truck Series and then as Managing Director of Technical Inspection and Officiating
Rick Allen	2003–2014	Truck and ARCA Series play-by-play (2003–2014); Substitute Xfinity Series play-by-play for standalone races only (2003–2006)	Became the play-by-play for Cup and Xfinity Series for NASCAR on NBC
Ray Dunlap	2003–2016	Truck and ARCA Series pit reporter ARCA play-by-play Xfinity Series pit reporter for standalone races only	
Hank Parker Jr.	2003–2006	Substitute color commentator, some Xfinity Series standalone races	
Glenn Jarrett	2002–2006	Substitute pit reporter, some standalone Xfinity Series races	Now works as a pit reporter for Motor Racing Network
Rick Mast	2003	Substitute color commentator or pit reporter, some standalone Xfinity Series races	
Randy LaJoie	2004	Substitute	Worked for NASCAR on ESPN from 2007 to 2009 as a substitute color commentator for what is now the Xfinity Series
Adam Alexander	2006–2024	Xfinity Series play-by-play (2015–2024); Cup Series studio host (all races 2019–2020, select races 2021–2024); Truck Series pit reporter (2006–2010) and play-by-play (select races 2014–2015 and 2023–2024); NASCAR Race Hub host (2010–2024)	Became the play-by-play for NASCAR on Prime Video, NASCAR on TNT and NASCAR on The CW in 2025
John Roberts	2007–2018	Truck Series pre and post-race show host, also hosted NASCAR RaceDay on NASCAR on Speed and filled in as studio host for the 2012 Daytona 500	Retired from broadcasting after the 2018 season
Krista Voda	2007–2014	Pit reporter (Cup Series) and studio host (Truck Series)	Left to become the studio host for NASCAR on NBC and was in that job from 2015 to 2020. In 2022, she was the play-by-play for the ARCA Menards Series on MAVTV.
Kenny Wallace	2007–2018	Select pre and post-race shows, Truck Series pit reporter at Eldora, also hosted NASCAR RaceDay on NASCAR on Speed	Retired from broadcasting after the 2018 season. He did return to Fox as a guest color commentator for 1 stage of the Cup Series races at Gateway in 2022 and 2023.
Danielle Trotta	2010–2016	Studio/NASCAR Race Hub host	Took a year off from broadcasting in 2017, returned to broadcasting in 2018 on NBC Sports Boston and returned to covering NASCAR on NASCAR on NBC in 2019 as host of the NASCAR Victory Lap post-race show. She still covers the sport working for Sirius XM NASCAR Radio and became the studio host for NASCAR on Prime Video in 2025.
Erin Andrews	2013	Guest pre-race reporter, 2013 Daytona 500 only	Sideline reporter for Fox's NFL coverage
Jim Tretow	2007–2018	Pit reporter for ARCA only	Worked for MAVTV as a color commentator for ARCA and still works as a track announcer.
Alan Cavanna	2015–2020	Truck Series pit reporter	Works as a pit reporter for Performance Racing Network and an analyst for NASCAR.com
Chris Neville	2015–2017	Cup, Xfinity and Truck Series pit reporter	
Ralph Sheheen	2015	Fill-in/alternate Truck Series play-by-play	
Brian Till	2015	Fill-in/alternate Truck Series play-by-play	Now works for NBC as a pit reporter and alternate play-by-play for IMSA sports car races
Vince Welch	2015–2022	Cup and Xfinity Series pit reporter and Truck Series play-by-play	
Jeff Gordon	2016–2021	Cup Series color commentator	Gordon left Fox after the 2021 season to work full-time at Hendrick Motorsports although he returned to Fox as a guest color commentator for the race at Atlanta in March 2022.
Kevin Lee	2017–2018	Play-by-play for ARCA only	Now works for NASCAR on NBC as a substitute pit reporter for standalone Xfinity Series races, a pit reporter for IndyCar races on NBC, and a play-by-play for IMSA sports car races on NBC.
Shannon Spake	2017–2024	Studio host for Cup and Xfinity Series in Fox's Charlotte studio and NASCAR Race Hub host	In the fall of 2024, Spake became a sideline reporter for the Charlotte Hornets on Bally Sports and hosted the NASCAR: Inside the Playoffs and NASCAR Daily with Shannon Spake shows. She also worked as a sideline reporter for Fox's NFL coverage in the fall when she worked for NASCAR on Fox.
Kim Coon	2019	Pit reporter for ARCA only	Still works for NASCAR.com and Motor Racing Network and became a pit reporter for NASCAR on NBC in 2022 and NASCAR on The CW in 2025.
Ricky Craven	2019–2020	Studio analyst/NASCAR Race Hub	Retired from broadcasting after the 2020 season
Lindsay Czarniak	2019–2020	Rotating/alternate NASCAR Race Hub host	Now works for CBS in the summer as the studio host for the Superstar Racing Experience and for NBC for the Olympics. She still works for Fox in the fall on their NFL coverage.
Dave Rieff	2019–2020	Play-by-play for ARCA only	
Dillon Welch	2019	Pit reporter for ARCA only	Now works as a pit reporter for NASCAR on NBC and NASCAR on The CW
Sara Walsh	2019	Rotating/alternate NASCAR Race Hub host	She still works for Fox on their NFL coverage.
Katie Osborne	2020–2022	ARCA pit reporter and Truck Series pit reporter at Pocono in 2021	She continues to work for NBC as a reporter for Mecum Auctions and Supercross.
Michael Strahan	2021	Guest pre-race reporter, 2021 Daytona 500 only	Studio analyst for Fox's NFL coverage

=== Previous guest analysts ===
Drivers (or crew chief in the case of Chad Knaus and Drew Blickensderfer) have appeared as rotating guest analysts for the Xfinity, Truck and/or the ARCA Menards Series broadcasts, and usually the same drivers return each year on top of a few that are added into the rotation each year. The new guest analysts in 2021 were Blickensderfer, Trevor Bayne, Greg Biffle, Chase Briscoe, Matt DiBenedetto, Brandon Jones, Andy Lally, Tyler Reddick, Tony Stewart, Kevin Swindell, and Daniel Suárez. Guest analysts that returned in 2021 from 2020 were Aric Almirola, Ryan Blaney, Kurt Busch, Matt Crafton, Austin Dillon, Joey Logano, and Bubba Wallace. Brad Keselowski, who had last appeared as a guest analyst in 2019, returned in 2021. Kyle Busch was the only driver to appear as a guest analyst on a 2020 broadcast that did not return for any races in 2021.

Numerous other drivers have appeared as guest analysts in years prior to 2020. In addition, Jeff Gordon, Jamie McMurray and Clint Bowyer were guest analysts before they became permanent analysts for Fox after their retirements from driving in NASCAR. Dale Earnhardt Jr. was also a guest analyst for Fox before he became a permanent analyst for NBC after he retired from driving in NASCAR full-time.

2024 guest analysts

XFINITY SERIES:

- Joey Logano (Atlanta, Las Vegas, Phoenix, COTA, Richmond, Texas, Dover, Darlington, Charlotte (play-by-play) and Sonoma)
- Brad Keselowski (Atlanta, Richmond, Darlington)
- Austin Cindric (Las Vegas, Martinsville)
- Ryan Blaney (Martinsville, Talladega, Dover and Charlotte)
- Daniel Suárez (Phoenix, COTA, Talladega, and Sonoma)
- Ross Chastain (Texas)
- Erik Jones (Charlotte)
- Carson Hocevar (pit reporter at Charlotte for Drivers Only broadcast)
- Josh Berry (pit reporter at Charlotte for Drivers Only broadcast)
- Brad Keselowski (studio host for Drivers Only broadcast at Charlotte)
- Austin Cindric (analyst for Drivers Only broadcast at Charlotte)

TRUCK SERIES:

- Carson Hocevar (Kansas and Charlotte)
- Joey Logano (Gateway)

ARCA SERIES:

- Austin Cindric (Daytona and Dover)
2023 guest analysts

CUP SERIES:
Fox's 2023 lineup of guest analysts for the Cup Series was as follows. (Guest analysts for Fox in the Xfinity and Truck Series in 2023 are listed above until Fox announces their 2024 lineup of commentators.)

Full-time permanent Fox commentators:

- Larry McReynolds (color commentator, Richmond and All-Star Race)
- Bobby Labonte (color commentator, Martinsville)
- Jamie McMurray (color commentator, All-Star Open and Sonoma)
- Michael Waltrip (color commentator, Gateway)
- Adam Alexander (additional host for the Clash and All-Star Race only)
- Trevor Bayne (additional analyst for Daytona)
- Bobby Labonte (additional analyst for Daytona)

Rotation of guest color commentators:

- Tony Stewart (Clash, Duel races, Daytona 500, Fontana, Atlanta, Bristol Dirt, Talladega and Charlotte)
- Danica Patrick (Las Vegas and Phoenix)
- Kurt Busch (guest color commentator at COTA and Kansas, guest pre-race show analyst at Richmond)
- Guenther Steiner (COTA)
- Chase Elliott (COTA)
- Rusty Wallace (Dover)
- Richard Petty (Darlington, Stage 1)
- Kyle Petty (Darlington, Stage 1)
- Carl Edwards (Darlington, Stage 2)
- Bill Elliott (Darlington, Stage 3)
- Darrell Waltrip (All-Star Race)
- Danny McBride (Charlotte, Stage 2)
- Kenny Wallace (Gateway, Stage 2)
2022 guest analysts

Cup Series:

- Tony Stewart (Clash, Daytona 500, COTA and Sonoma)
- Matt Kenseth (Fontana)
- Danica Patrick (Las Vegas and Phoenix)
- Jeff Gordon (Atlanta)
- Chad Knaus (Richmond and Martinsville)
- Darrell Waltrip (Bristol dirt)
- Dale Earnhardt Jr. (Talladega)
- Richard Petty (Darlington, Stage 1)
- Bill Elliott (Darlington, Stage 3)
- Frankie Muniz (All–Star Open)
- Kenny Wallace (Gateway, Stage 2)

Xfinity Series:

- Denny Hamlin (Daytona)
- Chad Knaus (Daytona)
- Coleman Pressley (in-race spotter analyst at Daytona, COTA, Richmond, Martinsville, Talladega, Darlington and Texas)
- Joey Logano (Fontana, Las Vegas, Phoenix, Atlanta, COTA, Richmond, Dover, Darlington, Texas and Charlotte)
- Ryan Blaney (Fontana, Las Vegas, Darlington and Charlotte)
- Daniel Suárez (Phoenix and Richmond)
- Kurt Busch (COTA and Talladega)
- Brad Keselowski (Atlanta and Dover)
- Erik Jones (Martinsville)
- Austin Dillon (Martinsville and Talladega)
- Kevin Harvick (Texas)

Truck Series:

- Kurt Busch (Daytona, Las Vegas, Bristol dirt, Kansas, Charlotte and Gateway)
- Andy Lally (COTA, Sonoma and Mid–Ohio)

ARCA Series:

- Chase Briscoe (Daytona)
- Austin Cindric (Talladega and Kansas)
- Corey LaJoie (Charlotte)

==== Drivers Only (+ Chad) broadcasts ====
Each year since 2017 (except for 2020 due to the COVID-19 pandemic), Fox has had active Cup Series drivers (plus crew chief Chad Knaus in 2019 and 2021) serve as every member of the broadcast team for one of their Xfinity Series races (Pocono in 2017, Talladega in 2018, and Charlotte in 2019, 2021 and 2022). The concept moved to the Craftsman Truck Series in 2025, where it will be used at Homestead-Miami Speedway for the series' primetime network television debut.

In 2021, Kevin Harvick, Ryan Blaney and Joey Logano were in the booth, Christopher Bell and Erik Jones were the pit reporters, and Brad Keselowski, Knaus, and Ricky Stenhouse Jr. were in the Charlotte studio. In 2022, the "Drivers Only" broadcast returned at the same race with the same three drivers in the booth and the return of Keselowski and Stenhouse to the studio. Austin Cindric and Tyler Reddick were the pit reporters, replacing Christopher Bell and Erik Jones, and Aric Almirola replaced Chad Knaus in the studio.

Drivers Only will feature only one full-time Fox professional, analyst Kevin Harvick, who will be the play-by-play announcer. Logano and Keselowski, who are two of the rotating analysts for the Truck Series in 2025, will be the analysts. Cindric and Carson Hocevar, who did the pit reporter role in 2024 for the Xfinity race in Charlotte, will serve as pit reporters.

== Broadcast lineups by year ==
2025

References: NASCAR Cup Series
Booth announcers

- Mike Joy (play-by-play)
- Clint Bowyer (color commentator)
- Kevin Harvick (color commentator)

Race Strategy, Technical and Rules analyst

- Larry McReynolds

Pit reporters

- Jamie Little
- Regan Smith
- Josh Sims (additional pit reporter for select races)
- Kaitlyn Vincie (additional pit reporter for select races)

Pre-race show (at track)

- Chris Myers (host)
- Josh Sims (fill-in host)
- Clint Bowyer (analyst)
- Kevin Harvick (analyst)
- Jamie McMurray (analyst)
- Michael Waltrip (gridwalk)
- Tom Rinaldi (Daytona 500 only)

NASCAR Craftsman Truck Series
Booth announcers

- Jamie Little (play-by-play)
- Kevin Harvick (alternative play–by–play / color commentator, select races)
- Michael Waltrip (color commentator, select races)
- Regan Smith (color commentator, select races)
- Trevor Bayne (color commentator, select races)
- Rotation of cup series drivers and crew chiefs (color commentator for select races, see full list below)
  - Joey Logano (Daytona, Atlanta, Las Vegas, Miami, Martinsville, Bristol, Texas, Charlotte)
  - Brad Keselowski (Atlanta, Las Vegas, Miami, Kansas, Talladega, Martinsville)
  - Carson Hocevar (Rockingham)
  - Ryan Blaney (North Wilkesboro)

Pit reporters All pit reporters rotated/took turns in 2025.

- Trevor Bayne
- Todd Bodine
- Amanda Busick
- Mike Joy (roving reporter at Lime Rock Park)
- Josh Sims
- Regan Smith
- Austin Cindric (pit reporter at Miami for drivers only broadcast)
- Carson Hocevar (pit reporter at Miami for drivers only broadcast)

ARCA Menards Series Booth announcers

- Jamie Little (rotating play-by-play)
- Eric Brennan (rotating play-by-play)
- Brent Stover (rotating play-by-play)
- Phil Parsons (color commentator)
- Trevor Bayne (color commentator, select races)
- Regan Smith (color commentator)
- Rotation of cup series drivers and crew chiefs (color commentator for select races, see full list below)
  - Austin Dillon (Talladega and Iowa)
  - Carson Hocevar (Kansas)

Pit reporters All pit reporters have rotated/taken turns in 2025.

- Amanda Busick
- Josh Sims
- Kaitlyn Vincie
- Alex Weaver
- Todd Bodine

Spanish language (Fox Deportes)

- Tony Rivera (play-by-play)
- Jessi Losada (color commentator)

Other commentators

- Mamba Smith (Kevin Harvick's Happy Hour Podcast co-host)
- Bob Pockrass (social media)

== Summary of broadcaster history ==
Full-time Fox Sports employees are in bold. Broadcasters or analysts who were only assigned to one race in a given season are in italics.

=== Race Coverage ===
Lap-by-Lap	Winston	Cup	Busch	Series	Craftsman	Truck Series
Lap-by-Lap	Nextel	Cup	Busch	Series	Craftsman	Truck Series
Lap-by-Lap	Sprint	Cup	Xfinity	Series	Camping World	Truck Series
Lap-by-Lap	Monster Energy	Cup	Xfinity	Series	Camping World	Truck Series
Lap-by-Lap	NASCAR	Cup	Xfinity	Series	Gander Outdoors	Truck Series
Mike Joy	**2001-2026**		**2001-2006**		**2009, 2015**	
Steve Byrnes			**2001-2006**		**2014**	
Mark Garrow			2002-2003, 2005			
Rick Allen			**2003-2006, 2011**		**2003-2014**	
Matt Yocum			**2004**			
Phil Parsons			**2006**			
Adam Alexander			**2015-2024**		2014, **2015, 2023-2024**	
Brian Till					2015	
Ralph Sheheen					2015	
Vince Welch					**2015, 2016-2022**	
Jamie Little			**2024**		**2023-2024**, **2025–present**	

Color Commentator	Winston	Cup	Busch	series	Craftsman	Truck Series
Color Commentator	Nextel	Cup	Busch	series	Craftsman	Truck Series
Color Commentator	Sprint	Cup	Xfinity	series	Camping World	Truck Series
Color Commentator	Monster Energy	Cup	Xfinity	series	Camping World	Truck Series
Color Commentator	NASCAR	Cup	Xfinity	series	Gander Outdoors	Truck Series
Darrell Waltrip	**2001-2019,** 2022-2023		**2001-2006, 2011**		**2003-2011**	
Larry McReynolds	**2001-2015, 2020, 2022-2023**		**2001-2006, 2015-2016**		**2005, 2009, 2011**	
Jeff Hammond			**2001-2002, 2005**			
Mike Wallace			2002			
Chad Little			2002-2006		2004	
Brett Bodine			2003			
Rusty Wallace	2023		2003			
Hank Parker Jr.			2003-2006		2005	
Dorsey Schroeder					**2003**	
Barry Dodson					**2003**	
Phil Parsons			**2004-2006, 2015, 2017**		**2003-2019, 2020-2021, 2022-2024**	
Michael Waltrip	**2011, 2014, 2022-2023**		**2011, 2015-2020, 2021-2024**		2003, **2004-present**	
Randy LaJoie			2004			
Johnny Benson Jr.			2004-2006		2004, 2009	
Kenny Wallace	2022-2023				2004-2006	
Hermie Sadler			2005-2006		2006	
Boris Said					2005	
John Andretti					2005	
Jimmy Spencer					**2006-2007**	
Marcos Ambrose					2007	
Doug Richert					2008	
Todd Bodine					**2013,** **2015-2021**	
Kevin Harvick	**2024–present**		2015-2020, 2022-2023, 2021		2015, 2017-2018, 2025	
Brad Keselowski			2015-2024		2021, 2025	
Clint Bowyer	**2021-present**		2015-2020, **2021**			
Jeff Gordon	**2016-2021,** 2022		2015			
Danica Patrick	2022-2023		2015-2016			
Joey Logano			2016-2024		2020, 2021, 2024, 2025	
Carl Edwards	2023		2016			
Denny Hamlin			2016, 2022			
Dale Earnhardt Jr.	2022		2016			
Chase Elliott	2023		2017-2018			
Jamie McMurray	**2022-2023**		2017-2018,**2020**, **2021-2023**,		**2020, 2021**	
Austin Dillon			2017-2021, 2022-2024		2021	
Regan Smith			2017, **2018-2020**		**2020**	
Ryan Blaney			2018-2019, 2021-2023		2021	
Erik Jones			2018-2019, 2021-2022		2018	
Kyle Larson					2018	
Kurt Busch	2023		2019-2022		2018, 2020-2022	
Jimmie Johnson			2019			
Chad Knaus	2022		2019-2020, 2022			
Bubba Wallace			2019, 2021			
Kyle Busch			2020			
Aric Almirola			2020-2021			
Tony Stewart	2022-2023		2021			
Drew Blickensderfer			2021			
Daniel Suárez			2021, 2022, 2023			
Tyler Reddick			2021			
Greg Biffle					2021, 2023	
Andy Lally					2021, 2022	
Kevin Swindell					2021	
Matt Kenseth	2022					
Richard Petty	2022-2023					
Bobby Labonte	**2022-2023**					
Bill Elliott	2022-2023					
Trevor Bayne			**2022-2023**		**2022**	
Guenther Steiner	2023					
Kyle Petty	2023					
Coleman Pressley			2023			
Austin Cindric			2023			
Carson Hocevar					2024-2025	

Pit Reporter	Winston	Cup	Busch	series	Craftsman	Truck Series
Pit Reporter	Nextel	Cup	Busch	series	Craftsman	Truck Series
Pit Reporter	Sprint	Cup	Xfinity	series	Camping World	Truck Series
Pit Reporter	Monster Energy	Cup	Xfinity	series	Camping World	Truck Series
Pit Reporter	NASCAR	Cup	Xfinity	series	Gander Outdoors	Truck Series
Dick Berggren	**2001-2012**		**2001-2006**		**2009**	
Steve Byrnes	**2001-2014**		**2001-2006**			
Matt Yocum	**2001-2020**		**2001-2006, 2015-2020**		**2008-2009**, **2015-2016, 2020**	
Jeanne Zelasko	**2001-2006**		**2001-2006**			
Jeff Hammond	**2013**		**2001-2006**			
Mark Garrow			2002-2006			
Barry Dodson			2002		2003	
Glenn Jarrett			2002-2006			
Brett McMillan			2002			
Bill Venturini			2003			
Rick Mast			2003			
Ray Dunlap			**2004-2006**, **2011**		**2003-2014**	
Phil Parsons					**2003**, **2017-2018**	
Wendy Venturini			**2004-2005**		**2004-2005**	
Hank Parker Jr.			2005			
Bob Dillner					**2005-2007, 2013-2014**	
Krista Voda	**2007-2014**		**2006**, **2011**		**2006-2012**	
Hermie Sadler			**2011**, **2015-2019**		2006, **2011-2019**	
Adam Alexander					2006, **2007-2010**	
Carl Edwards	2007-2008					
Tony Rizzuti					2007	
Jamie Little	**2015-present**		**2015-2022**		**2020-2022**	
Chris Neville	**2015-2017**		**2015-2017**		**2015, 2017**	
Vince Welch	**2015-2022**		**2015-2017, 2019, 2021-2022**		**2015**	
Kaitlyn Vincie			**2017-2018**		**2015-2018**	
Alan Cavanna			**2019**		**2017-2020**	
Regan Smith	**2018-present**		**2018-2024**		**2020-2022**, **2023–present**	
Kenny Wallace					**2018**	
Christopher Bell					2018	
Michael Waltrip					**2018**	
Jamie Howe			**2021-2024**		**2019, 2021-present**	
Katie Osborne					**2021**	
Josh Sims	**2023-present**		**2022**, **2023-2024**		**2021-present**	
Larry McReynolds	**2022-2023**					
Heather DeBeaux					**2022**, **2023-present**	
Amanda Busick					**2023-present**	

== See also ==
- List of NASCAR on NBC broadcasters
