= Brookwood High School (Georgia) =

Public high school in Snellville, Georgia, United States

Location
- 1255 Dogwood Road; Snellville, Georgia 30078; United States; 33°53′02″N 84°02′25″W

Information
- School type: Public high school
- Motto: "A Tradition of Excellence"
- Established: 1981
- School district: Gwinnett County Public Schools
- Principal: Brett Savage
- Teaching staff: 207.20 (FTE)
- Grades: 9–12
- Enrollment: 3,803 (2024–2025)
- Student to teacher ratio: 18.35
- Campus: Suburban
- Colors: Maroon & gold
- Athletics conference: Georgia High School Association Class 6A, Region 7
- Nickname: Broncos
- Accreditation: Southern Association of Colleges and Schools
- Website: https://brookwoodhs.gcpsk12.org

Brookwood High School is a public secondary school in Snellville, Georgia, in suburban Atlanta, part of the Gwinnett County School System. Brookwood serves several areas of southern Gwinnett County, including Snellville, Lawrenceville, and Lilburn.

== History ==
Planning for Brookwood High School was started in 1977 to lessen the overcrowding of nearby South Gwinnett High School and Parkview High School. A committee of educators from Gwinnett County met to create and discuss specifications for the facility. The school officially opened in 1981 under principal Emmett Lawson.

The school derived its name from its location on the intersection of Holly Brook Road (a section of this road is now Webb Gin House Road) and Dogwood Road. The school colors, maroon and gold, were based on the colors of Florida State University. The original school mascot had a horseshoe around the bronco, which was later removed. The administration had suggested that Brookwood be the Brookwood Bears. The original mascot was a drawing of an entire bronco, but the current logo uses only a bronco's head. The runner-up mascot choice was the Bruins, and the second place color scheme was baby blue and gold.

== Feeder schools ==
Brookwood is the high school of the Brookwood cluster, a group of schools which feed into one primary high school for an area in Gwinnett County. The middle schools that feed into Brookwood are Alton C. Crews Middle School and Five Forks Middle School. Crews Middle has two elementary school feeders, Brookwood Elementary (which is located next door to Brookwood High) and Craig Elementary. Five Forks Middle has students from RD Head Elementary and Gwin Oaks Elementary, along with some students from Brookwood and Craig Elementary.

== Notable alumni ==
- Robby Bostain (born 1984) – American-Israeli basketball player
- Jason Bulger – former MLB pitcher
- Rennie Curran – Former NFL football player
- Jason Elam – retired NFL placekicker
- Jennifer Ferrin – Daytime Emmy-nominated actress, As the World Turns
- Joe Gebbia - Co-founder of Airbnb
- Stephon Heyer – former NFL lineman
- Jamie Howe - Broadcast sports reporter
- Sean Johnson - Major League Soccer goalkeeper
- Michael Kelly – Emmy award-nominated actor
- Dylan Lonergan - college football quarterback for the Rutgers Scarlet Knights
- Cameron Lynch - Former NFL football player
- Nick Moore - football player
- Cedric Mullins - Major League Baseball player
- Amy Robach – anchor of ABC's Good Morning America
- Rubi Rose - rapper
- Lucas Sims - Major League Baseball pitcher
- Troy Snitker - MLB hitting coach
- Amanda Weir – Olympic swimmer
- Mansfield Wrotto – NFL football player
- Walker Zimmerman - Major League Soccer player
