= Cameron Lynch =

American football player (born 1993)

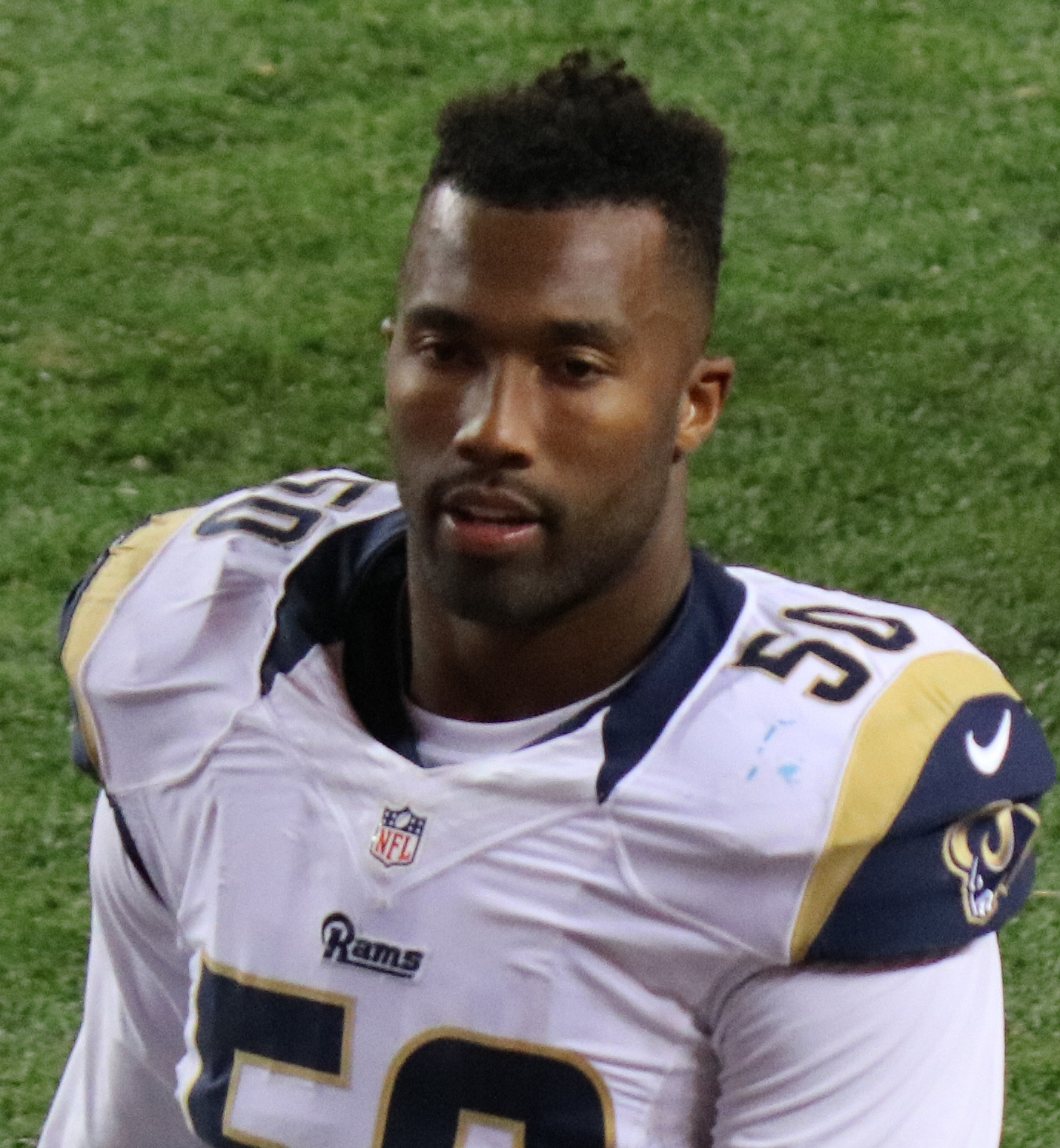
- Lynch with the St. Louis Rams in 2016

No. 50, 52, 55, 43
- Position: Linebacker

Personal information
- Born: August 4, 1993 (age 33); Artesia, California, U.S.
- Listed height: 6 ft 0 in (1.83 m)
- Listed weight: 229 lb (104 kg)

Career information
- High school: Brookwood (Snellville, Georgia)
- College: Syracuse
- NFL draft: 2015: undrafted

Career history
- St. Louis Rams (2015); Tampa Bay Buccaneers (2016–2017); Los Angeles Rams (2017); Tampa Bay Buccaneers (2018)

Career NFL statistics
- Total tackles: 19
- Fumble recoveries: 1
- Stats at Pro Football Reference

Cameron Ellis Lynch (born August 4, 1993) is an American former professional football player who was a linebacker in the National Football League (NFL). He played college football for the Syracuse Orange. He signed with the St. Louis Rams of the National Football League (NFL) as an undrafted free agent in 2015.

== College career ==
Lynch played college football at Syracuse University and graduated in 2015 with a bachelor’s degree in economics. In his senior year, he led the Orange and was ranked the No. 40 outside linebacker among 2015 NFL draft prospects by CBSSports.com.

== Professional career ==
=== St. Louis / Los Angeles Rams (first stint) ===
After going undrafted in the 2015 NFL draft, Lynch signed with the St. Louis Rams on May 8, 2015.

On September 3, 2016, Lynch was waived by the Rams as part of final roster cuts.

=== Tampa Bay Buccaneers (first stint) ===
On September 13, 2016, Lynch was signed to the Tampa Bay Buccaneers' practice squad. He was promoted to the active roster on October 9, 2016.

On September 17, 2017, in Week 2 against the Chicago Bears, Lynch recovered a fumble to help set up the Buccaneers on eventual touchdown scoring drive. He was waived by the Buccaneers on December 2, 2017.

=== Los Angeles Rams (second stint) ===
On December 6, 2017, Lynch was signed to the Los Angeles Rams' practice squad, and was promoted to the active roster three days later.

=== Tampa Bay Buccaneers (second stint) ===
On March 16, 2018, Lynch signed with the Buccaneers. He received multiple Bucs community MVP awards.

== Broadcasting career ==
Lynch had aspired to become a sports broadcaster and media personality during his college years. He began his broadcasting career at Syracuse when started a weekly Cuse.com feature named "Cam's Cam.", where he interviewed his teammates. He joined the USC Annenberg School for Communication and Journalism after his NFL career.

Lynch has worked with the NFL Network, Fox Sports and was selected to broadcast the 2019 Super Bowl. In 2019, he was named the interim co-host on an NBC daytime show.

In 2021, Lynch served as in-stadium broadcaster for Super Bowl LV, along with Scott Hanson.
