= Jessi Losada =

American sportscaster of Cuban descent

Jessi Losada is an American sportscaster of Cuban descent. For 36 years, Losada worked on Spanish television networks in the United States, broadcasting various different sports events and sports shows.

Losada joined Univision in 1978, becoming sports-anchor and producer for the channel's Los Angeles affiliate in 1980. Losada later moved to Miami, Florida, when he was promoted to national sports-anchor by the television conglomerate.

At that position, he worked for 19 years until moving to Univision's main rival, Telemundo, in 1999. At Telemundo, Losada worked on shows like Boxeo Telemundo (boxing), Titulares Telemundo (sports news), NBA basketball games, NFL football games, the Olympic Games and more. After 16 years at Telemundo, Losada left to join Fox Deportes in late 2015, where he has worked as announcer for football, boxing and motorsport.

Losada received six Emmy Awards; four for his coverage of Super Bowl games, one for his story of Rafael Palmeiro in 1992 and one for his coverage of the 1990 FIFA World Cup in Italy. Additionally, from 1984 to 1987, he broadcast games of the Los Angeles Rams on local radio in Los Angeles. He also worked Los Angeles Raiders games and was sports-anchor at CBS.
