= Jamie Howe =

American television auto racing reporter (born 1984)

- Born: October 22, 1984 (age 41); Nashville, Tennessee, U.S.
- Education: Georgia State University
- Occupation: Auto racing reporter
- Years active: 2003–present
- Employers: Fox Sports; IMSA Radio
- Spouse: Bryan Sellers
- Children: 2

Jamie Howe (born October 22, 1984) is an American television auto racing reporter. Her career began as a runner at American Le Mans Series endurance motor races before obtaining on-screen roles covering the championship, the National Hot Rod Association, the WeatherTech SportsCar Championship, the NASCAR Gander RV & Outdoors Truck Series and the ARCA Menards Series.

== Biography ==
=== Early life and education ===
Howe was born on October 22, 1984, in Nashville, Tennessee. She is oldest of two children in her family. Howe was educated at Brookwood High School in Snellville, Georgia. There, a teacher of hers helped introduce her to television broadcasting and interned at the CNN Student Bureau. Howe cited this experience for providing her with the experience of creating a news report from production to broadcast. After graduating from Brookwood High School, she became a swimming coach, and had taken up the sport before stopping due to an shoulder injury. Howe graduated from Georgia State University with a bachelor's degree in broadcast journalism in 2007.

=== Career ===
In April 2003, John Evenson, vice-president of broadcasting for the American Le Mans Series (ALMS), who had a child enrolled on her swimming course, invited her to attend the Grand Prix of Atlanta sports car race at Road Atlanta to observe the unseen aspects of broadcasting, and work as a runner for the championship's television compound. Wheeler Television Inc. president Patti Wheeler attended the event, and hired Howe as a runner for the 2004 and 2005 seasons, undertaking maintenance work and helped in constructing the broadcasting facilities. She later became a stage manager for the ALMS' commentary booth, before moving to its field production for feature broadcasts.

Howe was also assigned to work with several of the ALMS' roving reporters, which provided her with enough confidence to ask whether she could appear on-screen. As a freelancer, she has acted as Speed's pit lane reporter for the ALMS, the 24 Hours of Daytona, the 24 Hours of Le Mans, the National Hot Rod Association on ESPN2, ESPN3 and ABC from the 2010 season, and presented the program Lucas Oil on the Edge on Speed. She missed the final four races of the 2014 NHRA Mello Yello Drag Racing Series because she was on maternity leave.

Since 2015, Howe has worked with the Porsche Young Driver Academy, training drivers in how to communicate with the media as part of the curriculum. In January 2019, after Fox Sports dropped its coverage of IMSA's WeatherTech SportsCar Championship, she joined IMSA Radio as a pit lane reporter at selected races, beginning with the 2019 24 Hours of Daytona. The following month, Howe made her NASCAR broadcast debut in its Gander Outdoors Truck Series at Daytona International Speedway, and went on to join Fox Sports 2's broadcast of the General Tire #AnywhereIsPossible 200 ARCA Menards Series stock car race as a pit lane reporter in late May.

== Methodology ==
Howe employs the philosophy "everyone has a story" when interviewing team personnel, and builds relationships with racing drivers in order to keep herself updated on the events of a race, using this as a method to maintain the interest and intrigue in television viewers.

== Personal life ==
Howe met sports car driver Bryan Sellers at a press assignment in 2005. The two later married, and have two children.
