= Chad Knaus =

American NASCAR crew chief (born 1971)

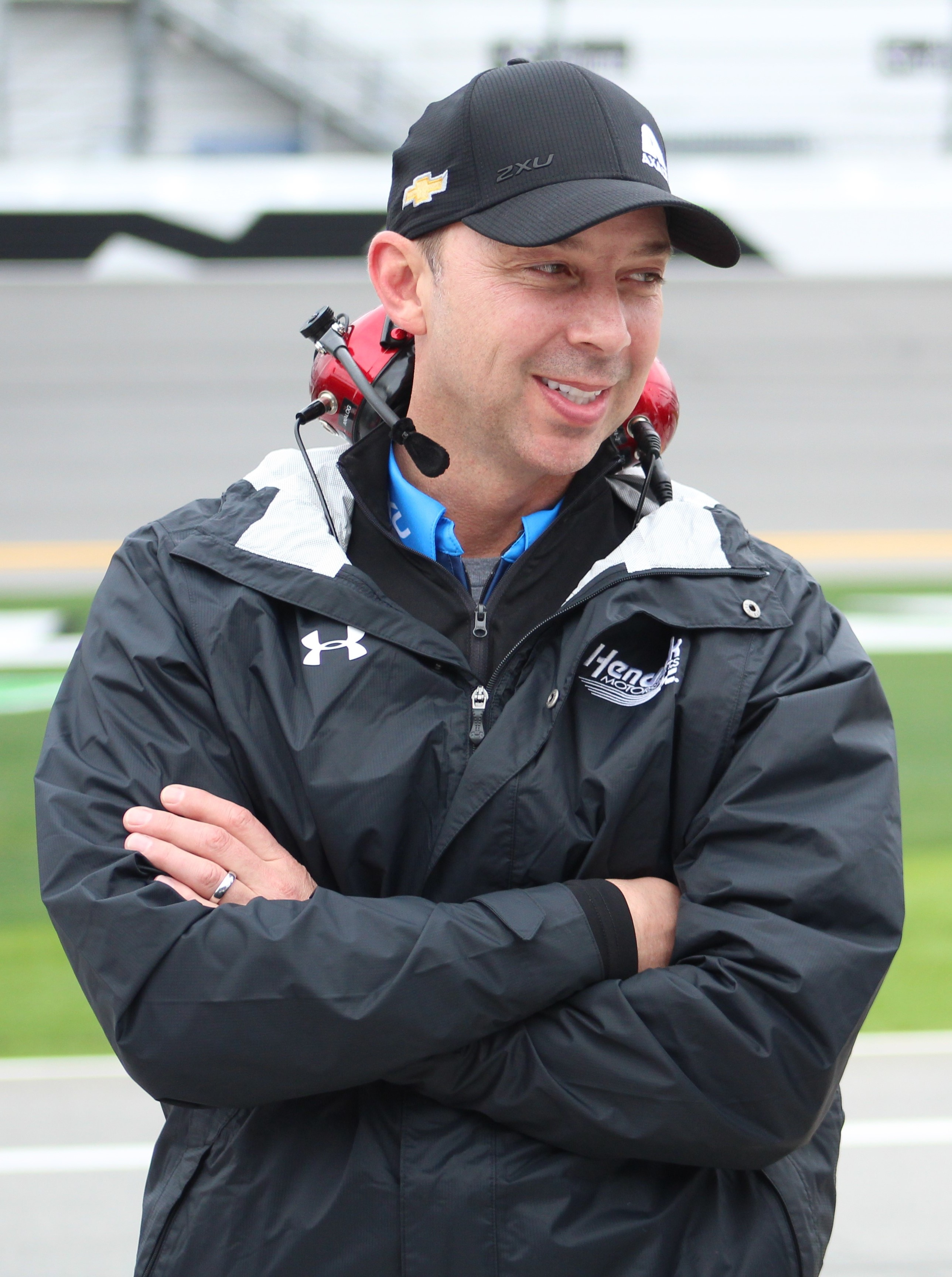
- Knaus at Daytona International Speedway in 2019

Personal information
- Full name: Chad Anthony Knaus
- Born: August 5, 1971 (age 55) Rockford, Illinois, U.S.
- Occupation: Vice President of Competition Crew Chief
- Years active: 1991–present

Sport
- Country: United States
- Sport: Motor racing
- League: NASCAR
- Team: Hendrick Motorsports

Achievements and titles
- National finals: 2006–2010, 2013, 2016 NASCAR Cup Series champion NASCAR Hall of Fame (2024)

Chad Anthony Knaus (/kəˈnaʊs/; born August 5, 1971) is an American former NASCAR crew chief. He is currently employed at Hendrick Motorsports as the Vice President of Competition. Knaus has 81 victories as Jimmie Johnson's crew chief and is the only NASCAR crew chief to win five consecutive championships. He has worked in NASCAR since 1991. Over this time, he has worked for four teams: Dale Earnhardt Incorporated, Melling Racing, Tyler Jet Motorsports and Hendrick Motorsports. He has been a crew chief in NASCAR for 19 years and is considered to be one of the greatest NASCAR crew chiefs of all time. He was inducted into the NASCAR Hall of Fame on January 19, 2024.

== Early life ==
Chad Anthony Knaus was born in Rockford, Illinois, on August 5, 1971. He has two half sisters and a half brother. He graduated from Jefferson High School in 1989. Knaus grew up around the racetracks of the Midwest helping his father, John, race against the likes of Mark Martin, Alan Kulwicki, Rusty Wallace, and Dick Trickle. By the time he was 14, Knaus served as crew chief during his father's Rockford Speedway championship season. The father-son combination also won the Great Northern Series championship and finished second in the NASCAR Winston Racing Series. A few years and seven track championships later, Knaus moved to North Carolina in 1991 to pursue a job in national stock car racing.

== Racing career ==
After working with Stanley Smith's stock car team, Knaus joined the No. 24 Hendrick Motorsports team led by crew chief Ray Evernham and raced by driver Jeff Gordon. From 1993 to 1997, Knaus advanced from being a general fabricator to managing the entire chassis and body construction program for the No. 24 team. Serving as a rear tire changer on the original Rainbow Warriors pit crew, Knaus was a part of the 1995 and 1997 championship teams.

Following the 1997 season, Knaus joined Dale Earnhardt, Inc. as car chief, where he worked with the No. 1 team driven by Steve Park and Darrell Waltrip in the 1998 season. After Park returned to the team from his injuries, Knaus and Waltrip moved to Tyler Jet Motorsports. In 1999, Knaus moved to Melling Racing after Evernham, who had just left Hendrick Motorsports, invited him to lead the Dodge development team. During two Dodge test sessions, Knaus worked with driver Stacy Compton. The two worked well together, resulting in Knaus' promotion to crew chief for Compton in October 2000.

=== Crew chief ===
In 2001, Compton and Knaus started in the front row for the Daytona 500, took the pole position at the Talladega 500, and qualified third at the Pepsi 400 at Daytona. Despite restrictor plate track qualifying prowess, the team scored just one top-ten (Daytona 500) and five top-15 finishes.

Knaus returned to Hendrick Motorsports for the 2002 season, becoming crew chief of the No. 48 car driven by rookie driver Jimmie Johnson. The team recorded three race wins, six top-five positions, 21 top-ten positions, and four pole positions, two of which were for the Daytona 500 and Aaron's 499. Knaus and Johnson finished the season fifth in the Driver's Championship. In 2003, the No. 48 team finished second in the Driver's Championship after earning two pole positions and winning three races, including the Coca-Cola 600. The team also recorded 14 top-five positions and 20 top-ten positions.

In 2004, the season began with some early disappointments in weeks two and three at Rockingham and Las Vegas. However, the team quickly rebounded with a week five win at the Carolina Dodge Dealers 400 at Darlington Raceway. Subsequent victories at the Coca-Cola 600 and the Pocono 500 helped solidify their place in the NASCAR Chase for the Cup towards the end of the season. However, poor finishes at Talladega (37th) and Kansas (32nd) nearly ended their chances to win the Nextel Cup, but three consecutive wins, and four in the final six races, put the No. 48 team 18 points behind leader Kurt Busch going into the final race. The second victory at the Subway 500 in Martinsville on October 24, 2004, was marred by tragedy when Rick Hendrick's son, Ricky, nieces and brother were killed in an airplane crash en route to the race. All eight passengers and both pilots died in the incident. Johnson and Knaus put the organization on their backs as they won the following race at Atlanta which was their third in a row. The team eventually finished second in the Cup Series points, losing to Kurt Busch by eight points. Johnson and Knaus won 8 races that season.

Knaus and Johnson finished the 2005 season ranked fifth in the standings after a crash in the season ending race at Homestead.

In 2006, Johnson and Knaus won their first Cup Series championship with five wins, 13 top-fives, and 24 top-tens.

In 2007, Knaus and Johnson took home their second straight championship with a series best 10 wins. Hendrick Motorsports was the dominant team in 2007, amassing 18 wins in 36 races. Knaus and Johnson led the Hendrick charge that saw the championship battle come down to a race between themselves and teammate Jeff Gordon.

In 2008, Knaus and Johnson tied NASCAR history with three straight championships set by Cale Yarborough. The Lowe's Racing team had seven wins, 15 top-fives, 22 top-tens, and six poles.

In 2009, Knaus shared 13 top-fives, 20 top-tens, six wins, and 1 DNF with Johnson as they won their record fourth championship in a row.

During the 2010 AAA Texas 500 at Texas Motor Speedway while Jimmie Johnson had the points lead, Knaus made a major decision. After Johnson had two bad pitstops during the race, Knaus decided to swap crew members by switching Johnson's crew with Jeff Gordon's crew since Gordon was taken out of the race during the caution. Johnson would finish in 9th but lost the points lead to Denny Hamlin and was behind the points lead by 33 points for the last two races of the season. But the move worked very well for Johnson and Knaus as Hamlin had troubles of his own and Johnson would win his fifth championship in a row with 6 wins, 17 top 5's, and 23 top 10's.

But in 2011, Johnson and Knaus failed to make it 6 championships in a row as Johnson scored only two wins, 14 top 5's, and 21 top 10's while finishing 6th in the standings.

In the 2012 season, Johnson was in a big title fight with Brad Keselowski during the chase. Johnson started 2nd in the chase and took the points lead after finishing 2nd in Loudon. But Keselowski would win the next race at Dover while Johnson finished in 4th and Keselowski took the points lead back. Johnson would win at Martinsville with 3 races left to boost him to the points lead. During the closing laps of the 2012 AAA Texas 500 at Texas, Johnson and Keselowski fought hard for the lead going back and forth but Johnson prevailed and won at Texas. But at Phoenix, Johnson blew a tire and hit the wall and ended up finishing 32nd 38 laps down. The finish ended up dropping them out of the points lead by 20 points to Keselowski. At Homestead in the final race of the season, Johnson had a competitive car and led 25 laps of the race and had a points lead as much by 7 points during the race. But Johnson had to retire on lap 225 of the race with issues with the rear gear and ended their title hopes. Johnson and Knaus scored 5 wins, 18 top 5's, and 24 top 10's and finished 3rd in the Cup Series standings in 2012.

To start the 2013 season, Johnson and Knaus won the Daytona 500 which would be Johnson's first with Knaus in the stand since Knaus was suspended when Johnson won the 2006 Daytona 500. 2013 would see Johnson and Knaus win their sixth Cup Series title after Johnson scored six wins, 16 top-fives and 24 top-tens.

In 2014, NASCAR changed the Chase format and expanded it from 12 to 16 drivers with a win locking them in the chase automatically and had 4 drivers get eliminated after three races with only four drivers competing for the title in the last race of the season. Johnson and Knaus won the Coca-Cola 600 at Charlotte to pick up their first win of 2014 and automatically locking themselves into the chase. Johnson and Knaus started the chase in second behind Brad Keselowski and made it through the Round of 16 with ease. But a 40th at Kansas, a 17th at Charlotte, and a 24th at Talladega eliminated Johnson from the Chase. Despite not being in the chase, Johnson and Knaus won at Texas. Johnson and Knaus scored four wins, 11 top-fives and 20 top-tens and finished 11th in the final standings.

In 2015, Johnson and Knaus won four races in the regular season and placed first in the standings when the chase began. Unfortunetly, their hopes of winning a record-tying seventh Cup Series Championship vanished quickly after a broken driveline and a 41st-place finish at Dover eliminated Johnson from the chase. Johnson and Knaus would win at Texas during the chase. Johnson and Knaus scored five wins, 14 top-fives, and 22 top-tens while they finished tenth in the standings.

In 2016, Johnson and Knaus only won two races during the regular season and were sixth in the standings when the chase began. Johnson and Knaus were able to get through the Round of 16 and advanced to the Round of 12. They scored their third win of the season in the first Round of 12 race at Charlotte which automatically advanced them to the Round of 8. During the first race of the Round of 8 at Martinsville, Johnson ended up losing fuel pressure during a caution. Despite this, Johnson would win and would automatically give him and Knaus a chance at Homestead-Miami Speedway to compete for their seventh Cup Series Championship. Johnson would qualify 14th for the race but had to go to the rear of the field for an unapproved body modification which meant he started in 40th. Johnson made his way through the field quickly and was in the top 10. But Johnson wasn't the most competitive car as he was in or near the top-five for most of the race and could not catch up to the other Championship contenders in Carl Edwards, Kyle Busch, and Joey Logano. With ten laps to go, Johnson was running in fifth when Carl Edwards got wrecked by Joey Logano and triggered a massive crash which ended Edwards' championship hopes. Johnson made it through the wreck unscathed and was ahead of Logano and Busch. Another caution flew with five laps to go setting up overtime and Johnson made his way to 2nd place in the race. Johnson took the lead from Kyle Larson on the restart and Johnson won the race giving him and Knaus their record-tying seventh Cup Series championship putting Johnson alongside Richard Petty and Dale Earnhardt for most Cup Series titles. Johnson and Knaus scored five wins, 11 top-fives and 17 top-tens en route to their seventh Cup Series title.

In the 13th race of the season at Dover, Johnson and Knaus scored their final win together. After that win, Johnson and Knaus' team struggled. They would make the chase but were eventually knocked out of the Round of 8 ending their hopes of their eighth Cup Series title. Johnson and Knaus scored three wins, four top-fives, and 11 top-tens in 2017 whole finishing in 10th in the standings.

2018 would be Knaus and Johnson's final season together. It would also be Knaus and Johnson's first winless season together. They made the chase and were battling for the win in the final lap of the inaugural Charlotte Roval race with Martin Truex Jr. but Johnson and Truex spun and Johnson would finish 8th and were eliminated in the Round of 16. Johnson and Knaus scored no wins, two top-fives, and 11 top-tens and finished 14th in the standings.

On October 10, 2018, Hendrick Motorsports announced that Knaus would move to the No. 24 team of William Byron in 2019, ending his 16-year partnership with Johnson after 83 wins and seven NASCAR Cup Championships. Byron posted his first win in 2020 at the Coke Zero Sugar 400 and Knaus's first win since 2017. In September 2020, it was announced Knaus would step down from his crew chief role at Hendrick Motorsports and become the team's vice president of competition.

=== Rules violations and suspensions ===
Knaus's first suspension, for two races, came in March 2001 for a seatbelt violation at the Atlanta Motor Speedway. It was notable because it was the first safety violation in the wake of Dale Earnhardt's death. Knaus appealed, but lost, returning at Texas three weeks later.

While working for Hendrick Motorsports, Knaus was accused of cheating after Jimmie Johnson's 2006 Daytona 500 qualifying run. He had made an illegal adjustment to the rear window, which resulted in his suspension from Cup Series events until March 22. Despite the loss of his crew chief (and having to start from the rear of the field in a backup car), Johnson won both the Daytona 500 and two of the first three races overall with interim crew chief Darian Grubb.

Knaus again found himself at the center of controversy during the road race debut of NASCAR's Car of Tomorrow. On June 23, 2007, the #24 crew (chiefed by Steve Letarte) and the #48 crew entered the inspection line for the Toyota/Save Mart 350 at Infineon Raceway with the newest body style out of the Hendrick shop. While both cars fit the templates, NASCAR officials questioned the shape of the fenders in between the template points. Johnson was not allowed to qualify the car and started at the back of the field. Knaus was fined $100,000 and was suspended for six races.

In February 2012, Knaus was once again accused by NASCAR officials of a rules violation involving the #48 car of Jimmie Johnson after it failed pre-race inspection for the Daytona 500. NASCAR issued penalties: Knaus and #48 car chief Ron Malec were suspended six races each, Knaus was fined $100,000, and driver Jimmie Johnson docked 25 driver points. On March 20, 2012, the chief appellate officer of NASCAR rescinded the suspensions and the docked driver points but left the financial penalty in place.

== Outside activities ==
Knaus was a regular commentator on NASCAR Performance, a program that was broadcast each race weekend on Speed. Each program provided a crew chief perspective on stock car racing. Knaus has also appeared in several television commercials for Kobalt Tools by Lowe's, the primary sponsor of the No. 48 car at the time. He also voices the crew chief in NASCAR games which include NASCAR 08 and NASCAR 09 on the Xbox 360 and PlayStation 3.

== Personal life ==
Knaus married Brooke Werner (the former Miss Vermont USA in 2009) in August 2015. They have two children.

== Crew chief statistics ==
=== Cup Series ===
Year	Driver	Races	Wins	Poles	Top 5	Top 10	DNFs	Position
2000	Casey Atwood	2	0	0	0	0	0	54th
2000	Stacy Compton	1	0	0	0	0	1	38th
2001	Stacy Compton	32	0	2	0	1	6	33rd
2002	Jimmie Johnson	36	3	4	6	21	3	5th
2003	Jimmie Johnson	36	3	2	14	20	3	2nd
2004	Jimmie Johnson	36	8	1	20	23	7	2nd
2005	Jimmie Johnson	36	4	1	13	22	5	5th
2006	Jimmie Johnson	32^{†}	3^{‡}	1	10	20	1	1st
2007	Jimmie Johnson	30^{†}	10	4	18	22	4	1st
2008	Jimmie Johnson	36	7	10	16	22	1	1st
2009	Jimmie Johnson	36	7	3	14	21	1	1st
2010	Jimmie Johnson	36	6	3	17	23	4	1st
2011	Jimmie Johnson	36	2	0	14	21	2	6th
2012	Jimmie Johnson	36	5	3	18	24	6	3rd
2013	Jimmie Johnson	36	6	3	16	24	1	1st
2014	Jimmie Johnson	36	4	1	11	20	4	11th
2015	Jimmie Johnson	36	5	1	14	22	1	10th
2016	Jimmie Johnson	36	5	1	11	16	4	1st
2017	Jimmie Johnson	36	3	0	4	11	7	10th
2018	Jimmie Johnson	36	0	0	2	11	4	14th
2019	William Byron	36	0	5	5	13	3	11th
2020	William Byron	35^{#}	1	0	4	13	2	14th
Totals		708	82	42	227	371	66	

- ^{†} - Suspended by NASCAR for multiple races.
- ^{‡} - Car was victorious two other times, but Knaus was suspended at the time.
- ^{#} - Knaus missed one race due to the birth of his daughter.

=== Xfinity Series ===
Year	Driver	Races	Wins	Poles	Top 5	Top 10	DNFs	Position
2004	Jimmie Johnson	1	0	0	1	1	0	98th
2005	Jimmie Johnson	2	0	0	1	1	0	53rd
2006	Jimmie Johnson	1	0	0	0	1	0	84th
2017	Justin Allgaier	1	0	0	0	0	0	3rd^{†}

- ^{†} - Knaus served as crew chief for Justin Allgaier for the 2017 Ford EcoBoost 300 Xfinity Series championship race as a result of a suspension to Jason Burdett at Phoenix because of a brake infraction.
