= Amanda Busick =

American sports reporter

- Born: Amanda Dianne Busick; November 7, 1986 (age 39); Greensboro, North Carolina, United States
- Occupation: Sports reporter
- Years active: 2014–present
- Employer: Fox Sports

Amanda Dianne Busick is an American sports reporter who works as the National Hot Rod Association's (NHRA) multi-media reporter on behalf of Fox Sports. Her career began interning at her local news television station in North Carolina and later Chicago. Busick's first on-camera was as a sideline reporter for Time Warner Cable Sports at the North Carolina High School Athletic Association in 2014. She began working for the NHRA in 2016 and was the Formula E pit lane reporter at the New York City ePrix in 2018 and 2019.

== Biography ==
=== Early life and education ===
Busick was raised in Greensboro, North Carolina. She is the daughter of Donna Lusk Busick and Reuben Wayne Busick, and has one brother, Matthew. She attended sporting events during her childhood, including American football, basketball, drag racing, and dirt track racing. Busick was first educated at Northeast Middle School, before moving to Northeast Guilford High School. In her school years, she held a strong interest in journalism and writing by watching a local news bulletin. Busick graduated from Northeast Guilford High School earlier than the rest of her class in December 2004, and enrolled at North Carolina State University in 2005. In December 2008, she graduated cum laude with a bachelor of science degree in business administration and a concentration in entrepreneurship.

=== Career ===
The Great Recession created less of an opportunity for employment as an entrepreneur who specialized in online education to students in high school, and thus Busick began her career interning at her county's local news television station. In 2010, she relocated from North Carolina to New York City with the ambition of obtaining employment as a sports reporter. During the daytime, Busick worked as an intern and took employment as a waitress at a restaurant during the night hours. She was able to convince a Chicago-based digital sports college company called Campus Insiders to employ her as a production assistant in 2012. To help her become financially stable, Busick took a second job at a restaurant.

In late 2014, she had her first on-camera role as a sideline reporter for Time Warner Cable Sports covering the North Carolina High School Athletic Association. Soon after Busick signed a contract with an agent to advance her career. She later took up employment as a stage manager for ESPN. In early 2015, Busick found employment as a meat salesperson and a bartender in Boston after her family had a major financial difficulty that required them to reside with each other.

She received a telephone call from National Hot Rod Association (NHRA) vice-president and chief content officer Ken Adelson in July 2015 about a job in the series. Busick had little knowledge of drag racing and spent the next three months researching the sport, and took up lessons at Frank Hawley's Drag Racing School to better acquaint herself with drag racing. In October 2015, she attended her first NHRA National event in Dallas, writing two reports for the series by interviewing multiple drivers. After the weekend, the NHRA invited her to report on its red carpet ceremony prior to its official banquet in Los Angeles. Busick was subsequently offered the position of a multi-media reporter for the NHRA on November 16, 2015.

She took up the position with the series' official broadcaster Fox Sports at the start of the 2016 season. From February to November each year, Busick covers NHRA events, works as a co-host for the Fox Sports 1 pre-race program Sunday Nitro Live. She reports on a reoccurring broadcast feature concerning the personality of drivers called Walk 1,000 Feet. In 2018, Busick was the pit lane reporter for the all-electric Formula E racing series race, the 2018 New York City ePrix double header, and performed the same role again at the 2019 edition.
