= 1999 Daytona 500 =

Auto race held at Daytona International Speedway in 1999

Race details
- Race 1 of 34 in the 1999 NASCAR Winston Cup Series
- 1999 Daytona 500 logo
- Date: February 14, 1999
- Location: Daytona International Speedway; Daytona Beach, Florida, US
- Course: Permanent racing facility 2.5 mi (4.02336 km)
- Distance: 200 laps, 500 mi (804.672 km)
- Weather: Temperatures reaching up to 64.9 °F (18.3 °C); wind speeds approaching 15.9 miles per hour (25.6 km/h)
- Average speed: 161.551 miles per hour (259.991 km/h)

Pole position
| Driver | Jeff Gordon | Hendrick Motorsports |

Qualifying race winners
| Duel 1 Winner | Bobby Labonte | Joe Gibbs Racing |
| Duel 2 Winner | Dale Earnhardt | Richard Childress Racing |

Most laps led
| Driver | Rusty Wallace | Penske Racing |
- Laps: 104

Winner
| No. 24 | Jeff Gordon | Hendrick Motorsports |

Television in the United States
- Network: CBS
- Announcers: Mike Joy, Buddy Baker, and Ned Jarrett
- Nielsen ratings: 9.6/25 (12.9 million viewers)

The 1999 Daytona 500, the 41st running of the event, was held February 14, 1999, at Daytona International Speedway. Jeff Gordon won the pole and won the race, making him the first Daytona 500 pole sitter to win the race since Bill Elliott in 1987. Including the No Bull 5 Bonus, Gordon earned a then-record payout of $2,172,246 for winning, while the last place finisher earned $91,751.

== Silly season ==
The start of the 1999 season was marked by three owners (Andy Petree, Travis Carter, and Joe Gibbs) expanding to 2 full-time teams for the first time in their careers. Their drivers were Kenny Wallace (Petree), Darrell Waltrip (Carter), and rookie Tony Stewart (JGR). Several new teams debuted, including Joe Bessey's new #60 and the #58 Ford owned by Scott Barbour. Speedweeks would also be marked by controversy involving Junie Donlavey's #90 Ford. Rookie driver Mike Harmon was dismissed from his team just before the Gatorade 125 qualifying races after reports surfaced that Harmon's sponsor, Big Daddy's Barbecue Sauce, was not living up to its contract obligations, as well as the team wanting a veteran driver to find more speed on the track; Donlavey's team wound up signing Mike Wallace, who'd driven for the team in the 1994-96 period.

== Qualifying and Gatorade 125s ==
Jeff Gordon won the pole for the race with a speed of just over 195 mph, and would start alongside former Indy Racing League champion Tony Stewart, who was making his Winston Cup debut. A total of 59 drivers would make an attempt to qualify for the 1999 Daytona 500. Bobby Labonte would win the first Gatorade 125 qualifying race after taking the lead from Gordon on lap 39. A lap 1 incident, the only caution of the First Duel, ended Dan Pardus and Jeff Green's chances at making the Daytona 500. Dale Earnhardt won the 2nd Gatorade duel after taking the lead from Stewart on lap 8. The second duel was marred by two caution periods that ended Dick Trickle, Glen Morgan, and David Green's chances at qualifying for the race. This would be Earnhardt's final win at Daytona.

Drivers qualified for the Daytona 500 either by finishing in the top 16 in their qualifying race, through a 2-lap qualifying run, or a provisional starting spot based on owner points from the 1999 season. They had three chances to make a 2-lap time trial run that would be fast enough to make the Daytona 500.

== Race summary ==
This race was known for Jeff Gordon's daring three-wide pass on Rusty Wallace and Mike Skinner. He passed Wallace after ducking to the apron, nearly plowing into the damaged car of Ricky Rudd. Skinner jumped to the outside and they raced three-wide for three laps until Dale Earnhardt (the defending Daytona 500 winner) gave Gordon the needed push. The race was also known for a determined Earnhardt repeatedly trying to pass Gordon for the lead on the final lap, only for Gordon to beat him to the finish. The race had a 13-car pileup on lap 135, in which eventual series champion Dale Jarrett flipped over twice but he was uninjured. This was also the first Winston No Bull 5 race of the season.

=== Results ===
| Pos | Grid | Car | Driver | Team | Make | Laps | Laps led | Status |
|---|---|---|---|---|---|---|---|---|
| 1 | 1 | 24 | Jeff Gordon (W) | Hendrick Motorsports | Chevrolet | 200 | 17 | Running |
| 2 | 4 | 3 | Dale Earnhardt (W) | Richard Childress Racing | Chevrolet | 200 | 0 | Running |
| 3 | 41 | 28 | Kenny Irwin Jr. | Robert Yates Racing | Ford | 200 | 0 | Running |
| 4 | 12 | 31 | Mike Skinner | Richard Childress Racing | Chevrolet | 200 | 31 | Running |
| 5 | 13 | 7 | Michael Waltrip | Mattei Motorsports | Chevrolet | 200 | 0 | Running |
| 6 | 7 | 33 | Ken Schrader | Andy Petree Racing | Chevrolet | 200 | 0 | Running |
| 7 | 24 | 44 | Kyle Petty | Petty Enterprises | Pontiac | 200 | 0 | Running |
| 8 | 10 | 2 | Rusty Wallace | Penske Racing | Ford | 200 | 104 | Running |
| 9 | 26 | 97 | Chad Little | Roush Racing | Ford | 200 | 0 | Running |
| 10 | 21 | 98 | Rick Mast | Burdette Motorsports | Ford | 200 | 0 | Running |
| 11 | 25 | 9 | Jerry Nadeau | Melling Racing | Ford | 200 | 0 | Running |
| 12 | 34 | 25 | Wally Dallenbach Jr. | Hendrick Motorsports | Chevrolet | 200 | 0 | Running |
| 13 | 14 | 16 | Kevin Lepage | Roush Racing | Ford | 200 | 0 | Running |
| 14 | 31 | 36 | Ernie Irvan (W) | MB2 Motorsports | Pontiac | 200 | 0 | Running |
| 15 | 27 | 75 | Ted Musgrave | Butch Mock Motorsports | Ford | 200 | 0 | Running |
| 16 | 35 | 71 | Dave Marcis | Marcis Auto Racing | Chevrolet | 199 | 0 | Flagged |
| 17 | 39 | 26 | Johnny Benson | Roush Racing | Ford | 199 | 0 | Flagged |
| 18 | 20 | 30 | Derrike Cope (W) | Bahari Racing | Pontiac | 199 | 0 | Flagged |
| 19 | 15 | 77 | Robert Pressley | Jasper Motorsports | Ford | 199 | 0 | Flagged |
| 20 | 6 | 12 | Jeremy Mayfield | Penske Racing | Ford | 199 | 7 | Flagged |
| 21 | 43 | 66 | Darrell Waltrip (W) | Haas-Carter Motorsports | Ford | 199 | 0 | Flagged |
| 22 | 40 | 11 | Brett Bodine | Brett Bodine Racing | Ford | 199 | 0 | Flagged |
| 23 | 42 | 90 | Mike Wallace | Donlavey Racing | Ford | 199 | 0 | Flagged |
| 24 | 18 | 22 | Ward Burton | Bill Davis Racing | Pontiac | 199 | 0 | Flagged |
| 25 | 3 | 18 | Bobby Labonte | Joe Gibbs Racing | Pontiac | 198 | 20 | Flagged |
| 26 | 28 | 58 | Ricky Craven | SBIII Motorsports | Ford | 197 | 0 | Flagged |
| 27 | 37 | 94 | Bill Elliott (W) | Bill Elliott Racing | Ford | 194 | 7 | Accident |
| 28 | 2 | 20 | Tony Stewart (R) | Joe Gibbs Racing | Pontiac | 181 | 0 | Flagged |
| 29 | 16 | 4 | Bobby Hamilton | Morgan-McClure Motorsports | Chevrolet | 174 | 0 | Accident |
| 30 | 29 | 10 | Ricky Rudd | Rudd Performance Motorsports | Ford | 168 | 0 | Flagged |
| 31 | 9 | 6 | Mark Martin | Roush Racing | Ford | 147 | 0 | Accident |
| 32 | 17 | 40 | Sterling Marlin (W) | SABCO Racing | Chevrolet | 144 | 0 | Accident |
| 33 | 22 | 45 | Rich Bickle | Tyler Jet Motorsports | Pontiac | 142 | 0 | Accident |
| 34 | 23 | 1 | Steve Park | Dale Earnhardt, Inc. | Chevrolet | 139 | 0 | Accident |
| 35 | 5 | 99 | Jeff Burton | Roush Racing | Ford | 138 | 0 | Accident |
| 36 | 32 | 42 | Joe Nemechek | SABCO Racing | Chevrolet | 137 | 0 | Accident |
| 37 | 8 | 88 | Dale Jarrett (W) | Robert Yates Racing | Ford | 134 | 14 | Accident |
| 38 | 19 | 5 | Terry Labonte | Hendrick Motorsports | Chevrolet | 134 | 0 | Accident |
| 39 | 30 | 60 | Geoffrey Bodine (W) | Joe Bessey Motorsports | Chevrolet | 134 | 0 | Accident |
| 40 | 38 | 21 | Elliott Sadler (R) | Wood Brothers Racing | Ford | 132 | 0 | Accident |
| 41 | 11 | 23 | Jimmy Spencer | Haas-Carter Motorsports | Ford | 121 | 0 | Accident |
| 42 | 33 | 55 | Kenny Wallace | Andy Petree Racing | Chevrolet | 92 | 0 | Engine |
| 43 | 36 | 43 | John Andretti | Petty Enterprises | Pontiac | 25 | 0 | Engine |
Failed to Qualify
| | | 84 | Stanton Barrett (R) | PBH Motorsports | Chevrolet | | | |
| | | 80 | Andy Hillenburg | Hover Motorsports | Ford | | | |
| | | 81 | Morgan Shepherd | Pinnacle Motorsports | Ford | | | |
| | | 91 | Steve Grissom | LJ Racing | Chevrolet | | | |
| | | 00 | Buckshot Jones (R) | Buckshot Racing | Pontiac | | | |
| | | 78 | Gary Bradberry (R) | Triad Motorsports | Ford | | | |
| | | 47 | Billy Standridge | Standridge Auto Racing | Ford | | | |
| | | 73 | Ken Bouchard | Barkdoll Racing | Chevrolet | | | |
| | | 59 | Mark Gibson (R) | CSG Motorsports | Ford | | | |
| | | 72 | Jim Sauter | Marcis Auto Racing | Chevrolet | | | |
| | | 79 | Norm Benning (R) | T.R.I.X. Racing | Chevrolet | | | |
| | | 13 | Dick Trickle | Bill Elliott Racing | Ford | | | |
| | | 15 | Jeff Green (R) | Bud Moore Engineering | Ford | | | |
| | | 48 | Glen Morgan (R) | Glen Morgan Racing | Chevrolet | | | |
| | | 50 | Dan Pardus (R) | Midwest Transit Racing | Chevrolet | | | |
| | | 41 | David Green (R) | Larry Hedrick Motorsports | Chevrolet | | | |
| | | 90 | Mike Harmon (R)^{2} | Donlavey Racing | Ford | | | |
"1999 Daytona 500 – Racing-Reference.info".
Notes: 1. After David Green failed to qualify for the Daytona 500, his sponsor Kodiak signed an agreement to sponsor Mike Wallace's entry for the Daytona 500.; 2. Mike Harmon was originally scheduled to drive the #90 on a full-time basis in 1999. He participated in time trials but was replaced before the qualifying races by Mike Wallace, due to difficulties between the 90 team and Harmon's sponsor.

== Media ==
=== Television ===
The Daytona 500 was covered by CBS in the United States for the twenty first straight year. Mike Joy, two-time NASCAR Cup Series champion Ned Jarrett and 1980 race winner Buddy Baker called the race from the broadcast booth. Dick Berggren, Ralph Sheheen and Bill Stephens handled pit road for the television side. Ken Squier would serve as co-host alongside Greg Gumbel.

CBS
| Host | Booth announcers | | Pit reporters |
| Host | Lap-by-lap | Color-commentators | Pit reporters |
|---|---|---|---|
| Greg Gumbel; Ken Squier | Mike Joy | Ned Jarrett; Buddy Baker | Dick Berggren; Ralph Sheheen; Bill Stephens |
