= 2000 DirecTV 500 =

Seventh race of the 2000 NASCAR Winston Cup Series

Race details
- Race 7 of 34 in the 2000 NASCAR Winston Cup Series
- The 2000 DirecTV 500 program cover, featuring Terry Labonte, Mark Martin, and Jeff Burton. Artwork by NASCAR artist Sam Bass.
- Date: April 2, 2000
- Location: Fort Worth, Texas, Texas Motor Speedway
- Course: Permanent racing facility
- Course length: 1.5 miles (2.41 km)
- Distance: 334 laps, 501 mi (806.281 km)
- Average speed: 131.152 miles per hour (211.069 km/h)
- Attendance: 223,000

Pole position
Driver	Terry Labonte	Hendrick Motorsports
- Time: 28.105

Most laps led
Driver	Dale Earnhardt Jr.	Dale Earnhardt, Inc.
- Laps: 106

Winner
No. 8	Dale Earnhardt Jr.	Dale Earnhardt, Inc.

Television in the United States
- Network: CBS
- Announcers: Mike Joy, Ned Jarrett, Buddy Baker

Radio in the United States
- Radio: Performance Racing Network

The 2000 DirecTV 500 was the seventh stock car race of the 2000 NASCAR Winston Cup Series and the fourth iteration of the event. The race was held on Sunday, April 2, 2000, before an audience of 223,000 in Fort Worth, Texas at Texas Motor Speedway, a 1.5 miles (2.4 km) permanent tri-oval shaped racetrack. The race took the scheduled 334 laps to complete. At race's end, Dale Earnhardt, Inc.'s Dale Earnhardt Jr. managed to dominate the final stages of the race, leading the final 53 laps of the race to take his first career NASCAR Winston Cup Series victory and his first victory of the season. To fill out the top three, Roush Racing's Jeff Burton and Joe Gibbs Racing's Bobby Labonte finished second and third, respectively.

== Background ==
The layout of Texas Motor Speedway, the venue where the race was held.

Texas Motor Speedway is a speedway located in the northernmost portion of the U.S. city of Fort Worth, Texas – the portion located in Denton County, Texas. The track measures 1.5 miles (2.4 km) around and is banked 24 degrees in the turns, and is of the oval design, where the front straightaway juts outward slightly. The track layout is similar to Atlanta Motor Speedway and Charlotte Motor Speedway (formerly Lowe's Motor Speedway). The track is owned by Speedway Motorsports, Inc., the same company that owns Atlanta and Charlotte Motor Speedway, as well as the short-track Bristol Motor Speedway.

=== Entry list ===
- (R) denotes rookie driver.

#	Driver	Team	Make
1	Steve Park	Dale Earnhardt, Inc.	Chevrolet
2	Rusty Wallace	Penske-Kranefuss Racing	Ford
3	Dale Earnhardt	Richard Childress Racing	Chevrolet
4	Bobby Hamilton	Morgan–McClure Motorsports	Chevrolet
5	Terry Labonte	Hendrick Motorsports	Chevrolet
6	Mark Martin	Roush Racing	Ford
7	Michael Waltrip	Mattei Motorsports	Chevrolet
8	Dale Earnhardt Jr. (R)	Dale Earnhardt, Inc.	Chevrolet
9	Stacy Compton (R)	Melling Racing	Ford
10	Johnny Benson Jr.	Tyler Jet Motorsports	Pontiac
11	Brett Bodine	Brett Bodine Racing	Ford
12	Jeremy Mayfield	Penske-Kranefuss Racing	Ford
13	Robby Gordon	Team Menard	Ford
14	Rick Mast	A. J. Foyt Enterprises	Pontiac
16	Kevin Lepage	Roush Racing	Ford
17	Matt Kenseth (R)	Roush Racing	Ford
18	Bobby Labonte	Joe Gibbs Racing	Pontiac
20	Tony Stewart	Joe Gibbs Racing	Pontiac
21	Elliott Sadler	Wood Brothers Racing	Ford
22	Ward Burton	Bill Davis Racing	Pontiac
24	Jeff Gordon	Hendrick Motorsports	Chevrolet
25	Jerry Nadeau	Hendrick Motorsports	Chevrolet
26	Jimmy Spencer	Haas-Carter Motorsports	Ford
27	Jeff Fuller	Eel River Racing	Pontiac
28	Ricky Rudd	Robert Yates Racing	Ford
31	Mike Skinner	Richard Childress Racing	Chevrolet
32	Scott Pruett (R)	PPI Motorsports	Ford
33	Joe Nemechek	Andy Petree Racing	Chevrolet
36	Ken Schrader	MB2 Motorsports	Pontiac
40	Sterling Marlin	Team SABCO	Chevrolet
41	Gary Bradberry	Larry Hedrick Motorsports	Chevrolet
42	Kenny Irwin Jr.	Team SABCO	Chevrolet
43	John Andretti	Petty Enterprises	Pontiac
44	Kyle Petty	Petty Enterprises	Pontiac
45	Adam Petty (R)	Petty Enterprises	Chevrolet
55	Kenny Wallace	Andy Petree Racing	Chevrolet
60	Dick Trickle	Joe Bessey Racing	Chevrolet
66	Darrell Waltrip	Haas-Carter Motorsports	Ford
71	Dave Marcis	Marcis Auto Racing	Chevrolet
75	Wally Dallenbach Jr.	Galaxy Motorsports	Ford
77	Robert Pressley	Jasper Motorsports	Ford
88	Dale Jarrett	Robert Yates Racing	Ford
90	Ed Berrier (R)	Donlavey Racing	Ford
91	Todd Bodine	LJ Racing	Chevrolet
93	Dave Blaney (R)	Bill Davis Racing	Pontiac
94	Bill Elliott	Bill Elliott Racing	Ford
97	Chad Little	Roush Racing	Ford
99	Jeff Burton	Roush Racing	Ford

== Practice ==
Originally, four practice sessions were scheduled to be held, with two sessions on Friday and two sessions on Saturday. However, due to rain, the scheduled final session was cancelled.

=== First practice ===
The first practice session was held on Friday, March 31, at 12:00 PM EST. The session lasted for one hour and 15 minutes. Dale Earnhardt, Inc.'s Steve Park set the fastest time in the session, with a lap of 28.278 and an average speed of 190.961 mph (307.322 km/h).

Pos.	#	Driver	Team	Make	Time	Speed
1	1	Steve Park	Dale Earnhardt, Inc.	Chevrolet	28.278	190.961
2	22	Ward Burton	Bill Davis Racing	Pontiac	28.282	190.934
3	33	Joe Nemechek	Andy Petree Racing	Chevrolet	28.306	190.772
Full first practice results

=== Second practice ===
The second practice session was held on Friday, March 31, at 2:05 PM EST. The session lasted for 55 minutes. Hendrick Motorsports' Terry Labonte set the fastest time in the session, with a lap of 28.148 and an average speed of 191.843 mph (308.741 km/h).

Pos.	#	Driver	Team	Make	Time	Speed
1	5	Terry Labonte	Hendrick Motorsports	Chevrolet	28.148	191.843
2	32	Scott Pruett (R)	PPI Motorsports	Ford	28.155	191.795
3	33	Joe Nemechek	Andy Petree Racing	Chevrolet	28.251	191.144
Full second practice results

=== Final practice ===
The final practice session was held on Saturday, April 1, at 10:00 AM EST. The session lasted for one hour. Wood Brothers Racing' Elliott Sadler set the fastest time in the session, with a lap of 28.426 and an average speed of 189.967 mph (305.722 km/h).

Pos.	#	Driver	Team	Make	Time	Speed
1	21	Elliott Sadler	Wood Brothers Racing	Ford	28.426	189.967
2	91	Todd Bodine	LJ Racing	Chevrolet	28.609	188.752
3	77	Robert Pressley	Jasper Motorsports	Ford	28.704	188.127
Full Happy Hour practice results

== Qualifying ==
Qualifying was scheduled split into two rounds. The first round was held on Friday, March 17, at 4:30 PM EST. Each driver would have two laps to set a fastest time; the fastest of the two would count as their official qualifying lap. During the first round, the top 25 drivers in the round would be guaranteed a starting spot in the race. Originally, a second round qualifying session was scheduled to be held on Saturday, March 18. However, due to rain, the round was cancelled, leaving all positions to be determined using the times from the first round. Positions 26–36 was decided on time, while positions 37–43 was based on provisionals. Six spots were awarded by the use of provisionals based on owner's points. The seventh was awarded to a past champion who has not otherwise qualified for the race. If no past champion needs the provisional, the next team in the owner points was awarded a provisional.

Terry Labonte, driving for Hendrick Motorsports, won the pole, setting a time of 28.105 and an average speed of 192.137 miles per hour (309.215 km/h) in the first round.

Five drivers failed to qualify.

=== Full qualifying results ===
Pos.	#	Driver	Team	Make	Time	Speed
1	5	Terry Labonte	Hendrick Motorsports	Chevrolet	28.105	192.137
2	16	Kevin Lepage	Roush Racing	Ford	28.129	191.973
3	32	Scott Pruett (R)	PPI Motorsports	Ford	28.158	191.775
4	8	Dale Earnhardt Jr. (R)	Dale Earnhardt, Inc.	Chevrolet	28.174	191.666
5	88	Dale Jarrett	Robert Yates Racing	Ford	28.222	191.340
6	1	Steve Park	Dale Earnhardt, Inc.	Chevrolet	28.236	191.245
7	27	Jeff Fuller	Eel River Racing	Pontiac	28.316	190.705
8	25	Jerry Nadeau	Hendrick Motorsports	Chevrolet	28.340	190.543
9	22	Ward Burton	Bill Davis Racing	Pontiac	28.345	190.510
10	6	Mark Martin	Roush Racing	Ford	28.369	190.349
11	31	Mike Skinner	Richard Childress Racing	Chevrolet	28.377	190.295
12	33	Joe Nemechek	Andy Petree Racing	Chevrolet	28.400	190.141
13	17	Matt Kenseth (R)	Roush Racing	Ford	28.435	189.907
14	18	Bobby Labonte	Joe Gibbs Racing	Pontiac	28.451	189.800
15	9	Stacy Compton (R)	Melling Racing	Ford	28.465	189.707
16	97	Chad Little	Roush Racing	Ford	28.495	189.507
17	3	Dale Earnhardt	Richard Childress Racing	Chevrolet	28.524	189.314
18	90	Ed Berrier (R)	Donlavey Racing	Ford	28.525	189.308
19	2	Rusty Wallace	Penske-Kranefuss Racing	Ford	28.537	189.228
20	28	Ricky Rudd	Robert Yates Racing	Ford	28.542	189.195
21	7	Michael Waltrip	Mattei Motorsports	Chevrolet	28.547	189.162
22	94	Bill Elliott	Bill Elliott Racing	Ford	28.562	189.062
23	24	Jeff Gordon	Hendrick Motorsports	Chevrolet	28.571	189.003
24	93	Dave Blaney (R)	Bill Davis Racing	Pontiac	28.584	188.917
25	11	Brett Bodine	Brett Bodine Racing	Ford	28.584	188.917
26	10	Johnny Benson Jr.	Tyler Jet Motorsports	Pontiac	28.586	188.904
27	42	Kenny Irwin Jr.	Team SABCO	Chevrolet	28.594	188.851
28	60	Dick Trickle	Joe Bessey Racing	Chevrolet	28.606	188.772
29	41	Gary Bradberry	Larry Hedrick Motorsports	Chevrolet	28.612	188.732
30	66	Darrell Waltrip	Haas-Carter Motorsports	Ford	28.612	188.732
31	12	Jeremy Mayfield	Penske-Kranefuss Racing	Ford	28.637	188.567
32	55	Kenny Wallace	Andy Petree Racing	Chevrolet	28.639	188.554
33	45	Adam Petty (R)	Petty Enterprises	Chevrolet	28.642	188.534
34	14	Rick Mast	A. J. Foyt Racing	Pontiac	28.653	188.462
35	21	Elliott Sadler	Wood Brothers Racing	Ford	28.719	188.029
36	36	Ken Schrader	MB2 Motorsports	Pontiac	28.732	187.944
Provisionals
37	99	Jeff Burton	Roush Racing	Ford	28.772	187.682
38	20	Tony Stewart	Joe Gibbs Racing	Pontiac	28.970	186.400
39	40	Sterling Marlin	Team SABCO	Chevrolet	28.911	186.780
40	43	John Andretti	Petty Enterprises	Pontiac	28.895	186.884
41	26	Jimmy Spencer	Haas-Carter Motorsports	Ford	28.858	187.123
42	4	Bobby Hamilton	Morgan–McClure Motorsports	Chevrolet	29.018	186.091
43	77	Robert Pressley	Jasper Motorsports	Ford	28.792	187.552
Failed to qualify
44	13	Robby Gordon	Team Menard	Ford	28.785	187.598
45	71	Dave Marcis	Marcis Auto Racing	Chevrolet	28.829	187.311
46	75	Wally Dallenbach Jr.	Galaxy Motorsports	Ford	28.837	187.259
47	44	Kyle Petty	Petty Enterprises	Pontiac	28.900	186.851
48	91	Todd Bodine	LJ Racing	Chevrolet	29.024	186.053
Official first round qualifying results
Official starting lineup

== Race results ==
Fin	St	#	Driver	Team	Make	Laps	Led	Status	Pts	Winnings
1	4	8	Dale Earnhardt Jr. (R)	Dale Earnhardt, Inc.	Chevrolet	334	106	running	185	$374,675
2	37	99	Jeff Burton	Roush Racing	Ford	334	37	running	175	$259,550
3	14	18	Bobby Labonte	Joe Gibbs Racing	Pontiac	334	40	running	170	$186,500
4	19	2	Rusty Wallace	Penske-Kranefuss Racing	Ford	334	58	running	165	$155,450
5	2	16	Kevin Lepage	Roush Racing	Ford	334	18	running	160	$128,800
6	31	12	Jeremy Mayfield	Penske-Kranefuss Racing	Ford	334	18	running	155	$106,650
7	17	3	Dale Earnhardt	Richard Childress Racing	Chevrolet	334	0	running	146	$108,750
8	1	5	Terry Labonte	Hendrick Motorsports	Chevrolet	334	3	running	147	$116,350
9	38	20	Tony Stewart	Joe Gibbs Racing	Pontiac	334	0	running	138	$99,225
10	20	28	Ricky Rudd	Robert Yates Racing	Ford	334	9	running	139	$105,125
11	10	6	Mark Martin	Roush Racing	Ford	334	0	running	130	$93,525
12	11	31	Mike Skinner	Richard Childress Racing	Chevrolet	334	1	running	132	$87,325
13	16	97	Chad Little	Roush Racing	Ford	334	0	running	124	$84,025
14	9	22	Ward Burton	Bill Davis Racing	Pontiac	334	0	running	121	$93,525
15	41	26	Jimmy Spencer	Haas-Carter Motorsports	Ford	333	2	running	123	$85,200
16	42	4	Bobby Hamilton	Morgan–McClure Motorsports	Chevrolet	332	1	running	120	$73,200
17	27	42	Kenny Irwin Jr.	Team SABCO	Chevrolet	332	1	running	117	$78,500
18	36	36	Ken Schrader	MB2 Motorsports	Pontiac	332	0	running	109	$68,800
19	6	1	Steve Park	Dale Earnhardt, Inc.	Chevrolet	332	6	running	111	$75,600
20	34	14	Rick Mast	A. J. Foyt Racing	Pontiac	331	0	running	103	$66,200
21	32	55	Kenny Wallace	Andy Petree Racing	Chevrolet	331	0	running	100	$75,400
22	24	93	Dave Blaney (R)	Bill Davis Racing	Pontiac	331	0	running	97	$60,700
23	25	11	Brett Bodine	Brett Bodine Racing	Ford	330	0	running	94	$59,700
24	30	66	Darrell Waltrip	Haas-Carter Motorsports	Ford	328	0	running	91	$61,100
25	23	24	Jeff Gordon	Hendrick Motorsports	Chevrolet	320	0	running	88	$76,150
26	43	77	Robert Pressley	Jasper Motorsports	Ford	318	0	engine	85	$58,400
27	3	32	Scott Pruett (R)	PPI Motorsports	Ford	318	13	running	87	$52,700
28	28	60	Dick Trickle	Joe Bessey Racing	Chevrolet	317	0	running	79	$61,900
29	21	7	Michael Waltrip	Mattei Motorsports	Chevrolet	300	1	engine	81	$60,300
30	22	94	Bill Elliott	Bill Elliott Racing	Ford	297	0	running	73	$59,450
31	13	17	Matt Kenseth (R)	Roush Racing	Ford	288	0	accident	70	$57,050
32	40	43	John Andretti	Petty Enterprises	Pontiac	287	0	running	67	$62,975
33	5	88	Dale Jarrett	Robert Yates Racing	Ford	285	18	running	69	$68,550
34	39	40	Sterling Marlin	Team SABCO	Chevrolet	279	0	engine	61	$53,425
35	18	90	Ed Berrier (R)	Donlavey Racing	Ford	270	0	engine	58	$41,900
36	15	9	Stacy Compton (R)	Melling Racing	Ford	255	0	running	55	$40,850
37	12	33	Joe Nemechek	Andy Petree Racing	Chevrolet	253	2	accident	57	$47,825
38	7	27	Jeff Fuller	Eel River Racing	Pontiac	233	0	accident	49	$38,775
39	35	21	Elliott Sadler	Wood Brothers Racing	Ford	221	0	running	46	$46,725
40	33	45	Adam Petty (R)	Petty Enterprises	Chevrolet	215	0	engine	43	$38,675
41	29	41	Gary Bradberry	Larry Hedrick Motorsports	Chevrolet	165	0	accident	40	$38,625
42	26	10	Johnny Benson Jr.	Tyler Jet Motorsports	Pontiac	143	0	accident	37	$38,575
43	8	25	Jerry Nadeau	Hendrick Motorsports	Chevrolet	110	0	accident	34	$46,525
Official race results

== Media ==
=== Television ===
The DirecTV 500 was covered by CBS in the United States for the fourth straight year and it was their final DirecTV 500 race as coverage would switch to Fox in 2001. Mike Joy, two-time NASCAR Cup Series champion Ned Jarrett and nineteen time NASCAR Cup Series race winner Buddy Baker called the race from the broadcast booth. Dick Berggren, Ralph Sheheen and Bill Stephens handled pit road for the television side. Ken Squier would serve as host.

CBS
Host	Booth announcers		Pit reporters
Host	Lap-by-lap	Color-commentators	Pit reporters
Ken Squier	Mike Joy	Ned Jarrett; Buddy Baker	Dick Berggren; Ralph Sheheen; Bill Stephens

== Standings after the race ==
Drivers' Championship standings

	Pos	Driver	Points
	1	Bobby Labonte	1,114
1	2	Mark Martin	1,030 (−84)
1	3	Ward Burton	1,024 (−90)
1	4	Dale Earnhardt	959 (−155)
1	5	Rusty Wallace	940 (−174)
2	6	Jeff Burton	934 (−180)
	7	Ricky Rudd	907 (−207)
4	8	Dale Jarrett	895 (−219)
	9	Terry Labonte	878 (−236)
4	10	Jeremy Mayfield	848 (−266)
Official driver's standings

- Note: Only the first 10 positions are included for the driver standings.

Previous race: 2000 Food City 500	NASCAR Winston Cup Series; 2000 season	Next race: 2000 Goody's Body Pain 500
