= 1999 Pepsi 400 =

Auto race held at Daytona International Speedway in 1999

Race details
- Race 17 of 34 in the 1999 NASCAR Winston Cup Series season
- Track map of Daytona International Speedway showing mainly the speedway.
- Date: July 3, 1999
- Official name: Pepsi 400
- Location: Daytona International Speedway, Daytona Beach, Florida
- Course: Permanent racing facility
- Course length: 2.500 miles (4.023 km)
- Distance: 160 laps, 400 mi (643.737 km)
- Weather: Very hot with temperatures of 86 °F (30 °C); wind speeds of 11.1 miles per hour (17.9 km/h)
- Average speed: 169.213 miles per hour (272.322 km/h)
- Attendance: 130,000

Pole position
Driver	Joe Nemechek	Team SABCO

Most laps led
Driver	Rusty Wallace	Penske-Kranefuss Racing
- Laps: 75

Winner
No. 88	Dale Jarrett	Yates Racing

Television in the United States
- Network: CBS
- Announcers: Mike Joy, Ned Jarrett, Buddy Baker

The 1999 Pepsi 400 was a NASCAR Winston Cup Series race that took place on July 3, 1999, at Daytona International Speedway in Daytona Beach, Florida. This race would make the halfway point of the 1999 NASCAR Winston Cup Series season.

== Race report ==
It took nearly two hours and twenty-two minutes for Dale Jarrett to defeat Dale Earnhardt under the race's final caution flag in front of a live audience of 130,000. Joe Nemechek would earn the pole position in this race driving at speeds up to 194.86 miles per hour or 313.60 kilometres per hour. Ricky Craven would become the last-place finisher in this 160-lap race due to a steering issue on lap 34. Mark Martin would be forced into a backup car while five drivers would fail to qualify for this race. Only Michael Waltrip, Buckshot Jones, Steve Park, and Craven would fail to finish the race. The average speed of the race was 169.213 miles per hour or 272.322 kilometres per hour with three cautions handed out by NASCAR authorities for nine brief laps. Rain would briefly occur for four laps before disappearing for the remainder of the race.

Loy Allen, Jr. would retire from NASCAR after this race. The total prize purse for this race was estimated at more than two million dollars. Winnings for this race varied from more than $160,000 for the winner and less than $36,000 for the last-place finisher.

Drivers who failed to qualify for this race are Derrike Cope, Hut Stricklin, Ken Bouchard, Robert Pressley and Stanton Barrett. Jeff Burton, Terry Labonte, Kyle Petty, Kevin Lepage, Rick Mast, Ted Musgrave and Steve Park had to use a provisional in order to qualify for the race.

Despite Rusty Wallace's average career finish of 18th place at Daytona International Speedway, Wallace would never clinch a win during his entire NASCAR Cup Series career. His best finish at Daytona would be second place at the 2002 Pepsi 400.

Stanton Barrett ran first round qualifying but withdrew before the second.

=== Top 10 finishers ===
Pos	Grid	No.	Driver	Manufacturer	Laps	Laps led	Points	Time/Status
1	12	88	Dale Jarrett	Ford	160	40	180	2:21:50
2	10	3	Dale Earnhardt	Chevrolet	160	18	175	Lead lap under caution
3	37	99	Jeff Burton	Ford	160	0	165	Lead lap under caution
4	8	31	Mike Skinner	Chevrolet	160	7	165	Lead lap under caution
5	9	18	Bobby Labonte	Pontiac	160	3	160	Lead lap under caution
6	6	20	Tony Stewart	Pontiac	160	0	160	Lead lap under caution
7	25	22	Ward Burton	Pontiac	160	0	146	Lead lap under caution
8	18	4	Bobby Hamilton	Chevrolet	160	0	142	Lead lap under caution
9	32	36	Ernie Irvan	Pontiac	160	0	138	Lead lap under caution
10	38	5	Terry Labonte	Chevrolet	160	0	134	Lead lap under caution

== Timeline ==
Section reference:

- Start of race: Joe Nemechek has the pole position.
- Lap 34: Ricky Craven's vehicle had some problem with its steering, making him the last-place finisher.
- Lap 78: Steve Park had engine problems, forcing him out of the race.
- Lap 86: Rain began, thus delaying the race.
- Lap 89: Rain ended, allowing the cars to go back to full speed.
- Lap 110: Buckshot Jones's radiator developed problems on the track.
- Lap 113: The rear end of Michael Waltrip's vehicle became unusable, forcing him to leave the race prematurely.
- Lap 148: Caution for debris, ended after two laps.
- Lap 159: Caution for a two-vehicle accident on turn four, ended after a single lap.
- Finish: Dale Jarrett was officially declared the winner of the event.

== Media ==
=== Television ===
The Pepsi 400 was covered by CBS in the United States for the first time. Mike Joy, two-time NASCAR Cup Series champion Ned Jarrett and 1983 race winner Buddy Baker called the race from the broadcast booth. Dick Berggren, Ralph Sheheen and Bill Stephens handled pit road for the television side. Ken Squier would serve as co-host alongside Greg Gumbel.

CBS
Host	Booth announcers		Pit reporters
Host	Lap-by-lap	Color-commentators	Pit reporters
Greg Gumbel; Ken Squier	Mike Joy	Ned Jarrett; Buddy Baker	Dick Berggren; Ralph Sheheen; Bill Stephens

== Standings after the race ==
Pos	Driver	Points	Differential
1	Dale Jarrett	2674	0
2	Bobby Labonte	2497	-177
3	Mark Martin	2440	-234
4	Jeff Burton	2419	-255
5	Jeff Gordon	2280	-394
6	Tony Stewart	2261	-413
7	Dale Earnhardt	2182	-492
8 ▲	Rusty Wallace	2053	-621
9 ▲	Ward Burton	2023	-651
10 ▼	Jeremy Mayfield	2018	-656

Preceded by 1999 Save Mart/Kragen 350	NASCAR Winston Cup Series Season; 1999	Succeeded by 1999 Jiffy Lube 300
