= NASCAR on CBS =

Television series

- Genre: Auto racing telecasts
- Created by: Neal Pilson
- Directed by: Bob Fishman; Larry Cavolina
- Presented by: Ken Squier; Mike Joy; Ned Jarrett; Buddy Baker; See commentators section below
- Theme music composer: Mark Wood (1995–1997); Godfrey Nelson & Lorainne Nelson Wolf (1998–2000)
- Composers: Mark Wood (1995–1997); Godfrey Nelson & Lorainne Nelson Wolf (1998–2000)
- Country of origin: United States
- Original language: English

Production
- Executive producers: Neal Pilson; Rich Gentile; Terry Ewert
- Producers: Bob Stenner; Eric Mann; Lance Barrow
- Production location: Various NASCAR venues
- Editors: Charlie Liotta; Ed Givnish
- Camera setup: Multi-camera
- Running time: 4 hours or until race ended (including commercials)
- Production company: CBS Sports: World Sports Enterprises (assisted 1983-2000)

Original release
- Network: CBS
- Release: February 12, 1960 – July 15, 2000

Related
- NASCAR on Fox (2001–present); NASCAR on NBC (2001–2006, 2015–present); NASCAR on TNT (2001–2014, 2025–present); CBS Sports Spectacular; NASCAR on TNN

NASCAR on CBS was the branding formerly used for broadcasts of NASCAR series races produced by CBS Sports, the sports division of the CBS television network in the United States from February 12, 1960 to July 15, 2000.

== History of coverage ==
=== Races covered by CBS ===
Races covered by CBS
Race	Track	Years covered	Series
Gatorade 125s	Daytona International Speedway	1960, 1979–1981, 1985–2000	Winston Cup Series
Daytona 500	Daytona International Speedway	1960, 1979–2000	Winston Cup Series
Atlanta 500	Atlanta International Raceway	1964	Winston Cup Series
World 600	Charlotte Motor Speedway	1964, 1975–1981	Winston Cup Series
Winston 500	Alabama International Motor Speedway	1975–1977	Winston Cup Series
Champion Spark Plug 400	Michigan International Speedway	1975	Winston Cup Series
Riverside 400	Riverside International Raceway	1976	Winston Cup Series
Los Angeles Times 500	Ontario Motor Speedway	1976–1980	Winston Cup Series
Bud Shootout	Daytona International Speedway	1979–2000	Winston Cup Series
Kmart 400	Michigan International Speedway	1982–2000	Winston Cup Series
DirecTV 500	Texas Motor Speedway	1997–2000	Winston Cup Series
Pepsi 400*	Daytona International Speedway	1999–2000	Winston Cup Series
Dixie 500	Atlanta Motor Speedway	1975–1977	Winston Cup Series
DieHard 500	Talladega Superspeedway	1976–1997	Winston Cup Series
Sears DieHard 200	The Milwaukee Mile	1995–2000	Craftsman Truck Series
Chevy Silverado 200	Nazareth Speedway	1998–2000	Craftsman Truck Series
Pikes Peak 300K	Pikes Peak International Raceway	1998	Craftsman Truck Series
Federated Auto Parts 250	Nashville Speedway USA	1999	Craftsman Truck Series
thatlook.com 200	New Hampshire International Speedway	2000	Craftsman Truck Series
NAPA Auto Parts 300	Daytona International Speedway	1997–2000	Busch Series: Grand National Division
Albertson's 300	Texas Motor Speedway	1997–2000	Busch Series: Grand National Division
CarQuest Auto Parts 250	Gateway International Raceway	1997–1998	Busch Series: Grand National Division
Jiffy Lube Miami 300	Miami-Dade Motorsports Complex	1995–1997	Busch Series: Grand National Division
BellSouth Mobility 320	Nashville Speedway USA	1999	Busch Series: Grand National Division
Sears DieHard 250	The Milwaukee Mile	1997, 2000	Busch Series: Grand National Division

Notes:

- 1. The 1998 Pepsi 400 at Daytona was scheduled to be broadcast by CBS, but due to wildfires occurring in the immediate Daytona Beach area, the race was postponed until later in the season, and the broadcast rights were moved to CBS' cable partner, TNN.
- 2. The Gatorade 125's were run on Thursday, but CBS would air them via tape-delay on Saturdays but from 1997 would be aired before or after the Busch Series race.

=== Pre-1979 ===
The very first NASCAR races to ever be shown on television were broadcast by CBS. In February 1960, the network sent a "skeleton" production crew to Daytona Beach, Florida and the Daytona International Speedway to cover the Daytona 500's Twin 100 (now the Bluegreen Vacations Duel) qualifying races on February 12, 1960.

==== 1979 Daytona 500: The breakthrough ====
CBS Sports president Neal Pilson and motorsports editor Ken Squier believed that America would watch an entire stock car race live on television. Prior to 1979, television coverage of the Daytona 500 either began when the race was halfway over, or as an edited highlight package that aired a week later on ABC's Wide World of Sports. On February 18, 1979, CBS presented the first flag-to-flag coverage of the Daytona 500 (and 500-mile race to be broadcast live on national television in general). The Indianapolis 500 was only broadcast on tape delay that evening in this era; most races were broadcast only through the final quarter to half of the race, as was the procedure for ABC's Championship Car racing broadcasts; with the new CBS contract, the network and NASCAR agreed to a full live broadcast. That telecast introduced in-car and low-level track-side cameras, which has now become standard in all forms of automotive racing broadcasts. The race drew incredible ratings, in part due to the compelling action both on and off the track, and in part because a major snowstorm on the East Coast kept millions of viewers indoors.

=== 1980s ===
==== 1980 World 600 ====
On May 29, 1980, CBS paid a fee of roughly US$50,000 or $100,000 to Charlotte Motor Speedway to broadcast the World 600 NASCAR stock-car race. Benny Parsons edged out Darrell Waltrip to win a grand prize of $44,850 in a race that was watched by perhaps 3.7 million viewers on the network.

==== 1983 Daytona 500 ====
During its coverage of the 1983 Daytona 500, CBS introduced an innovation which director Bob Fishman helped develop – a miniature, remote-controlled in-car camera called RaceCam. Fishman directed every Daytona 500 telecast on CBS, with the exception of 1992, 1994 and 1998 because Fishman was away directing CBS' figure-skating coverage for the Winter Olympics.

=== 1990s ===
==== 1990 and 1998 Daytona 500 ====
After years of trying to win it, Dale Earnhardt appeared headed for certain victory in the 1990 Daytona 500 until a series of events in the closing laps. On lap 193, Geoff Bodine spun in the first turn, causing the third and final caution of the race. Everyone pitted except Derrike Cope, who stayed out. On the lap 195 restart, Earnhardt retook and held the lead, only to puncture a tire when he drove over a piece of metal bell housing from the failed engine of Rick Wilson's car on Lap 199. As Earnhardt's damaged car slowed, Cope drove past and earned his first Winston Cup (now NASCAR Cup) victory. It was the first of two victories for the relatively unknown Cope in the 1990 season. In an ironic twist, KIRO-TV, the local CBS affiliate serving Cope's hometown at the time in the Seattle suburb of Spanaway, opted to pre-empt the race to telecast a Seattle SuperSonics basketball game, and the race was delayed until 3:00 p.m. Pacific Time because of the pre-emption.

Earnhardt would eventually win the race in 1998 (under caution), with commentator Mike Joy describing Earnhardt's victory as the "most anticipated moment in the history of motor racing" after his "20 years of trying, 20 years of frustration" of failing to win the race.

==== 1992 Busch Clash and Daytona 500 ====
For one year, Daytona 500 pole qualifying and the Busch Clash swapped days: the Busch Clash was held on Saturday, and qualifying was held Sunday. This move was made at the request of CBS, who wanted the additional time on Sunday for its coverage of the 1992 Winter Olympics.

The network had aired the Busch Clash since it began in 1979. The race debuted on a Sunday, which CBS broadcast live. Pole position qualifying for the Daytona 500 would start Sunday at 10:00 a.m., followed by the Daytona ARCA 200. The Busch Clash would be held after the ARCA race at 3:00 p.m.

==== 1996 DieHard 500 ====
Dale Earnhardt took a horrifying tumble down the front straightaway in "The Big One," after Ernie Irvan got into the side of Sterling Marlin which caused him to hit Earnhardt. After he hit the wall hard, Earnhardt was hit by multiple cars upside down and on the car's side. He ended up breaking his collarbone, and this helped begin a winless streak that spanned the rest of the 1996 season and all of the 1997 season. The race was cut short due to the wreck, and a rainstorm earlier in the race added the factor of darkness, with Jeff Gordon winning. These events helped push the DieHard 500 from the heat, humidity, and almost commonly occurring afternoon thunderstorms of late July to a much cooler, and in the case of the weather, more stable early October date. This was the last Cup race to not be televised live because of the rain delay; the broadcast of the race aired one week later, as an abridged broadcast on CBS.

==== 1998 Craftsman Truck Series ====
In 1998, a CBS-televised race at Pikes Peak International Raceway in Fountain, Colorado, scheduled for 186 laps ran 12 extra laps (totaling 198) because of multiple attempts at a successful green-white-checkered finish.

==== 1999 Daytona 500 ====
20 years after its Daytona 500 broadcast, CBS used at least 200 people and more than 80 cameras for their coverage:

- 33 in-car cameras - three cameras in 11 different cars.
- 10 "pole" cameras above the pits.
- 35 cameras around the track.
- A camera in a blimp.
- A camera with each of the three pit reporters.
- A camera in the booth.

CBS also planned to use more computerized graphics and a super slow-motion camera with a long lens.

==== Affiliation with The Nashville Network (TNN) ====
TNN had two self-operating and self-promoting sub-divisions, TNN Outdoors and TNN Motor Sports. TNN Outdoors was responsible for the programming of hunting and fishing shows; TNN Motor Sports was responsible for production of all the network's racing coverage, including NASCAR Winston Cup, Indy Racing League, and smaller outfits such as USAC, NHRA and ARCA. Motorcycle and speedboat racing was also broadcast. TNN Outdoors and TNN Motor Sports also marketed themselves, selling a variety of merchandise and licensing their brands for use on video games.

In 1995, the motorsports operations were moved to Concord, North Carolina into the industrial park located at Charlotte Motor Speedway, where TNN had purchased controlling interest in motorsports production company World Sports Enterprises. Among TNN personalities from the motorsports operation were Mike Joy, Eli Gold, Buddy Baker, Neil Bonnett, Randy Pemberton, Ralph Sheheen, Dick Berggren and Rick Benjamin.

Westinghouse Electric Corporation, which at the time owned the CBS networks and had an existing relationship with TNN through its Group W division, purchased TNN and its sister network CMT outright in 1995 to form CBS Cable (along with the short-lived startup network Eye On People).

Most of the original entertainment-oriented programming ceased production, and the network began to rely more on TNN Outdoors and TNN Motor Sports for programming. The network's ties to CBS allowed it to pick up country-themed dramas from the 1980s that originally aired on the broadcast network such as The Dukes of Hazzard and Dallas, neither of which had been seen on television since their original runs ended, and also allowed it to serve as an overflow feed for CBS Sports broadcasts, which happened during a NASCAR Busch Series race at Texas Motor Speedway in 1999 (though the network was a center of controversy by not airing the following year's second-tier race at Texas following a rain delay) and also during a PGA Tour event at Firestone Country Club. The 1998 Pepsi 400 was also moved to TNN when the race was postponed from the then-traditional July date to October 17, 1998, as a result of the 1998 Florida wildfires.

=== The end of NASCAR on CBS (2000) ===
NASCAR wanted to capitalize on its increased popularity at the start of the 21st century, so the organization decided that future television deals would be centralized; that is, the networks would negotiate directly with NASCAR for a regular schedule of telecasts. That deal was struck on December 15, 1999. The old deal arrangement saw each track negotiate with the networks to broadcast their races. As a result, NASCAR had races on CBS, TNN, ESPN, ABC, NBC and TBS. ESPN and its parent network ABC broadcast the most races during the 2000 season (18). TNN had the second most (8, plus the All-Star Race, then known as The Winston), followed by CBS (4, plus the Busch Clash and 125-mile qualifying races for the Daytona 500), TBS (3), and NBC, who covered just one Cup race and had only joined the ranks the year before with the inaugural race at Homestead-Miami Speedway.

With many tracks now falling under the ownership of either the France-family led International Speedway Corporation or the Bruton Smith led Speedway Motorsports, it was much easier for consolidated television packages to be negotiated. NASCAR wanted to increase the number of races by each partner, and have as many races on broadcast networks as possible, to prevent fans from missing races. CBS's commitments to the PGA Tour, college football, and the NFL also prevented it from airing as many races as NASCAR wanted.

The first consolidated TV deal was struck on December 15, 1999. Under the six-year, $2.4 billion deal, the rights to the Winston Cup Series (now NASCAR Cup Series) and Busch Series (now O'Reilly Auto Parts Series) schedules were divided between Fox Sports and an NBC Sports/Turner Sports consortium, with Fox and FX carrying the first half of the season, NBC and TNT carrying the second half, and the rights to the Daytona 500 and Pepsi 400 weekends alternating between both rightsholders on an annual basis (with Fox carrying the 500 and 400 in odd- and even-numbered years respectively, and vice versa).

In June 2021, after acquiring rights to Tony Stewart's Superstar Racing Experience (SRX) series, CBS Sports chairman Sean McManus ruled out that it was a prelude to a potential bid for NASCAR broadcasting rights in the foreseeable future, due to in large part to CBS's heavy commitment to golf.

In October 2026, CBS's current parent company Paramount Skydance acquired TNT's current parent company Warner Bros. Discovery, and placed its TNT Sports division under current CBS Sports president David Berson with an intent to eventually merge it into CBS Sports. As part of the integration, it was reported that Skydance was considering the possibility of giving TNT Sports properties broadcast television coverage on CBS if it is contractually capable of doing so; TNT had regained rights to the NASCAR Cup Series under a new seven-year contract in 2025, encompassing five mid-season races. Ahead of the acquisition, NASCAR CEO Steve O'Donnell had discussed with Skydance CEO David Ellison the possibility of returning NASCAR to CBS; at a Front Office Sports conference in October 2026, O'Donnell stated he planned to meet with Berson, noting that "CBS used to be a great partner of ours, Turner has been fantastic, so who knows. I think it's an opportunity for us, especially as you look forward, to keep everybody close, but we’re very happy with the folks we currently have for sure.”

== Ratings ==
The television ratings for the Daytona 500 have surpassed those of the Indianapolis 500 since 1995, even though the 1995 race was available in fewer homes than in the past. CBS had lost affiliates in several major markets as a result of a realignment in the wake of Fox landing the broadcast television rights to the National Football Conference of the NFL, and was actually not available in a NASCAR Busch Series market, Milwaukee; that city's new CBS affiliate, WDJT-TV, was not available to some Southeastern Wisconsin cable providers.

== On-air staff ==
=== Races ===
==== Cup ====
Year	Date	Event	Track	Network	Coverage	Commentary		Pit Reporters	Host
Year	Date	Event	Track	Network	Coverage	Lap-by-lap	Color	Pit Reporters	Host
1976	May 2	Winston 500	Talladega	CBS	Highlights	Ken Squier	Lee Petty	Ned Jarrett	—N/a
1976	August 22	Champion Spark Plug 400	Michigan	CBS	Highlights	Ken Squier	Donnie Allison	Ned Jarrett	—N/a
1977	May 29	World 600	Charlotte	CBS	Highlights	Ken Squier	David Hobbs	Brock Yates	—N/a
1977	August 7	Talladega 500	Talladega	CBS	Highlights	Ken Squier	Lee Petty		—N/a
1977	November 20	Los Angeles Times 500	Ontario	CBS	Highlights	Ken Squier	David Hobbs	Brock Yates	—N/a
1978	May 28	World 600	Charlotte	CBS	Highlights	Ken Squier	David Hobbs	Brock Yates	—N/a
1978	August 6	Talladega 500	Talladega	CBS	Highlights	Ken Squier	Lee Petty		—N/a
1978	November 19	Los Angeles Times 500	Ontario	CBS	Highlights	Ken Squier	David Hobbs	Brock Yates	—N/a
1979	February 11	Busch Clash	Daytona	CBS	Live	Ken Squier	David Hobbs	Brock Yates	—N/a
1979	February 15	Twin 125's	Daytona	CBS	Highlights	Ken Squier	David Hobbs	Brock Yates	Dick Stockton
1979	February 18	Daytona 500	Daytona	CBS	Live	Ken Squier	David Hobbs	Ned Jarrett; Brock Yates	—N/a
1979	May 27	World 600	Charlotte	CBS	Highlights	Ken Squier	David Hobbs	Ned Jarrett; Brock Yates	—N/a
1979	August 5	Talladega 500	Talladega	CBS	Live	Ken Squier	Lee Petty	Ned Jarrett; Brock Yates	—N/a
1979	November 18	Los Angeles Times 500	Ontario	CBS	Highlights	Ken Squier	David Hobbs	Brock Yates	—N/a
1980	February 10	Busch Clash	Daytona	CBS	Live	Ken Squier	David Hobbs	Ned Jarrett; Brock Yates	—N/a
1980	February 14	Twin 125's	Daytona	CBS	Highlights	Ken Squier	David Hobbs	Ned Jarrett; Brock Yates	—N/a
1980	February 17	Daytona 500	Daytona	CBS	Live	Ken Squier	David Hobbs	Ned Jarrett; Brock Yates	—N/a
1980	May 25	World 600	Charlotte	CBS	Live/Highlights	Ken Squier	David Hobbs	Ned Jarrett; Brock Yates	—N/a
1980	August 3	Talladega 500	Talladega	CBS	Live	Ken Squier	David Hobbs	Ned Jarrett; Brock Yates	Dick Stockton
1980	November 15	Los Angeles Times 500	Ontario	CBS	Live	Ken Squier	David Hobbs	Ned Jarrett; Brock Yates	Dick Stockton
1981	February 8	Busch Clash	Daytona	CBS	Live	Ken Squier	Dale Earnhardt	Ned Jarrett; David Hobbs	—N/a
1981	February 12	Twin 125's	Daytona	CBS	Highlights	Ken Squier	David Hobbs	Ned Jarrett; Brock Yates	—N/a
1981	February 15	Daytona 500	Daytona	CBS	Live	Ken Squier	David Hobbs	Ned Jarrett; Brock Yates	—N/a
1981	May 24	World 600	Charlotte	CBS	Live	Ken Squier	David Hobbs	Ned Jarrett; Brock Yates	—N/a
1981	August 2	Talladega 500	Talladega	CBS	Live	Ken Squier	Donnie Allison	Ned Jarrett; Brock Yates	—N/a
1982	February 7	Busch Clash	Daytona	CBS	Highlights	Ken Squier	Richard Petty; A. J. Foyt	Ned Jarrett	—N/a
1982	February 14	Daytona 500	Daytona	CBS	Live	Ken Squier	David Hobbs	Ned Jarrett; Larry Nuber	—N/a
1982	June 20	Gabriel 400	Michigan	CBS	Live/Delayed	Ken Squier	Tom Sneva	Ned Jarrett; Larry Nuber	—N/a
1982	August 1	Talladega 500	Talladega	CBS	Live	Ken Squier	David Hobbs	Ned Jarrett; Larry Nuber	—N/a
1983	February 13	Busch Clash	Daytona	CBS	Delayed	Ken Squier	Richard Petty; A. J. Foyt	David Hobbs	—N/a
1983	February 20	Daytona 500	Daytona	CBS	Live	Ken Squier	David Hobbs	Ned Jarrett; Larry Nuber	—N/a
1983	June 19	Gabriel 400	Michigan	CBS	Live	Ken Squier	Ned Jarrett	Mike Joy; Larry Nuber	—N/a
1983	July 31	Talladega 500	Talladega	CBS	Live	Ken Squier	Ned Jarrett	Mike Joy; Larry Nuber	—N/a
1984	February 12	Busch Clash	Daytona	CBS	Live	Ken Squier	Ned Jarrett	Mike Joy	—N/a
1984	February 19	Daytona 500	Daytona	CBS	Live	Ken Squier	David Hobbs	Ned Jarrett; Chris Economaki; Mike Joy	—N/a
1984	June 17	Miller High Life 400	Michigan	CBS	Live	Ken Squier	Ned Jarrett	Chris Economaki; Mike Joy	—N/a
1984	July 29	Talladega 500	Talladega	CBS	Live	Ken Squier	Ned Jarrett; Benny Parsons	Chris Economaki; Mike Joy	—N/a
1985	February 10	Busch Clash	Daytona	CBS	Live	Ken Squier	Chris Economaki	Ned Jarrett; Neil Bonnett	—N/a
1985	February 14	7-Eleven Twin 125's	Daytona	CBS	Highlights	Ken Squier	Ned Jarrett; David Hobbs	Chris Economaki; Mike Joy	—N/a
1985	February 17	Daytona 500	Daytona	CBS	Live	Ken Squier	Ned Jarrett; David Hobbs	Chris Economaki; Mike Joy	—N/a
1985	June 16	Miller 400	Michigan	CBS	Live	Ken Squier	Ned Jarrett	Chris Economaki; Mike Joy	—N/a
1985	July 28	Talladega 500	Talladega	CBS	Live	Ken Squier	Ned Jarrett; David Hobbs	Chris Economaki; Mike Joy	—N/a
1986	February 9	Busch Clash	Daytona	CBS	Live	Ken Squier	Chris Economaki	Ned Jarrett; Benny Parsons	—N/a
1986	February 13	7-Eleven Twin 125's	Daytona	CBS	Highlights	Ken Squier	Ned Jarrett; David Hobbs	Chris Economaki; Mike Joy	—N/a
1986	February 16	Daytona 500	Daytona	CBS	Live	Ken Squier	Ned Jarrett; David Hobbs	Chris Economaki; Mike Joy	—N/a
1986	June 15	Miller American 400	Michigan	CBS	Live	Ken Squier	Ned Jarrett	Chris Economaki; Mike Joy	—N/a
1986	July 27	Talladega 500	Talladega	CBS	Live	Ken Squier	Ned Jarrett; Neil Bonnett	Chris Economaki; Mike Joy	—N/a
1987	February 8	Busch Clash	Daytona	CBS	Live	Ken Squier	Ned Jarrett	Mike Joy	Chris Economaki
1987	February 12	Gatorade Twin 125s	Daytona	CBS	Highlights	Ken Squier	Ned Jarrett; David Hobbs	Mike Joy; Dave Despain	Chris Economaki
1987	February 15	Daytona 500	Daytona	CBS	Live	Ken Squier	Ned Jarrett; David Hobbs	Mike Joy; Dave Despain	Chris Economaki
1987	June 28	Miller American 400	Michigan	CBS	Live	Ken Squier	Ned Jarrett	Mike Joy; Dave Despain	Chris Economaki
1987	July 26	Talladega DieHard 500	Talladega	CBS	Live	Ken Squier	Ned Jarrett	Chris Economaki; Mike Joy	Chris Economaki
1988	February 7	Busch Clash	Daytona	CBS	Live	Ken Squier	Ned Jarrett	Mike Joy	Chris Economaki
1988	February 11	Twin 125 Qualifiers	Daytona	CBS	Highlights	Ken Squier	Ned Jarrett; Chris Economaki	Mike Joy; Dave Despain	Chris Economaki
1988	February 14	Daytona 500	Daytona	CBS	Live	Ken Squier	Ned Jarrett; Chris Economaki	Mike Joy; David Hobbs; Dave Despain	Chris Economaki
1988	June 26	Miller Genuine Draft 400	Michigan	CBS	Live	Ken Squier	Ned Jarrett; Chris Economaki	Mike Joy; Dave Despain	Chris Economaki
1988	July 31	Talladega DieHard 500	Talladega	CBS	Live	Ken Squier	Ned Jarrett; Chris Economaki	Mike Joy; Dave Despain	Chris Economaki
1989	February 12	Busch Clash	Daytona	CBS	Live	Ken Squier	Ned Jarrett	Mike Joy	Chris Economaki
1989	February 16	Twin 125 Qualifiers	Daytona	CBS	Highlights	Ken Squier	Ned Jarrett; Chris Economaki	Mike Joy; Dave Despain	Chris Economaki
1989	February 19	Daytona 500	Daytona	CBS	Live	Ken Squier	Ned Jarrett; Chris Economaki	Mike Joy; David Hobbs; Dave Despain	Chris Economaki
1989	June 25	Miller Genuine Draft 400	Michigan	CBS	Live	Ken Squier	Ned Jarrett; Chris Economaki	Mike Joy; Dave Despain	Chris Economaki
1989	July 30	Talladega DieHard 500	Talladega	CBS	Live	Ken Squier	Ned Jarrett; Chris Economaki	Mike Joy; Dave Despain	Chris Economaki
1990	February 11	Busch Clash	Daytona	CBS	Live	Ken Squier	Ned Jarrett	Mike Joy; Dave Despain	Chris Economaki
1990	February 15	Twin 125 Qualifiers	Daytona	CBS	Highlights	Ken Squier	Ned Jarrett; Chris Economaki	Mike Joy; David Hobbs; Dave Despain	Chris Economaki
1990	February 18	Daytona 500	Daytona	CBS	Live	Ken Squier	Ned Jarrett; Chris Economaki	Mike Joy; David Hobbs; Dave Despain	Chris Economaki
1990	June 24	Miller Genuine Draft 400	Michigan	CBS	Live	Ken Squier	Ned Jarrett	Mike Joy; Dave Despain	Chris Economaki
1990	July 29	DieHard 500	Talladega	CBS	Live	Ken Squier	Ned Jarrett; David Hobbs	Mike Joy; Dave Despain	Chris Economaki
1991	February 10	Busch Clash	Daytona	CBS	Live	Ken Squier	Ned Jarrett	Mike Joy; Dave Despain	Chris Economaki
1991	February 14	Gatorade Twin 125 Qualifiers	Daytona	CBS	Highlights	Ken Squier	Ned Jarrett; David Hobbs	Mike Joy; Dave Despain	Chris Economaki
1991	February 17	Daytona 500	Daytona	CBS	Live	Ken Squier	Ned Jarrett; David Hobbs	Mike Joy; Dave Despain	Chris Economaki
1991	May 19	The Winston	Charlotte	CBS	Live	Ken Squier	Ned Jarrett	Mike Joy; Neil Bonnett	Chris Economaki
1991	June 23	Miller Genuine Draft 400	Michigan	CBS	Live	Ken Squier	Ned Jarrett	Mike Joy; Neil Bonnett	Chris Economaki
1991	July 28	DieHard 500	Talladega	CBS	Live	Ken Squier	Ned Jarrett	Mike Joy; Neil Bonnett	Chris Economaki
1992	February 9	Busch Clash	Daytona	CBS	Live	Ken Squier	Ned Jarrett; Neil Bonnett	Mike Joy	Chris Economaki
1992	February 13	Gatorade Twin 125 Qualifiers	Daytona	CBS	Highlights	Ken Squier	Ned Jarrett; Neil Bonnett	Mike Joy; David Hobbs	Chris Economaki
1992	February 16	Daytona 500	Daytona	CBS	Live	Ken Squier	Ned Jarrett; Neil Bonnett	Mike Joy; David Hobbs	Chris Economaki
1992	June 21	Miller Genuine Draft 400	Michigan	CBS	Live	Ken Squier	Ned Jarrett; Neil Bonnett	Mike Joy; Chris Economaki	Chris Economaki
1992	July 26	DieHard 500	Talladega	CBS	Live	Ken Squier	Ned Jarrett; Neil Bonnett	Mike Joy; Randy Pemberton	Chris Economaki
1993	February 7	Busch Clash	Daytona	CBS	Live	Ken Squier	Ned Jarrett; Neil Bonnett	Mike Joy	Chris Economaki
1993	February 11	Gatorade Twin 125 Qualifiers	Daytona	CBS	Highlights	Ken Squier	Ned Jarrett; Neil Bonnett	Mike Joy; David Hobbs	Chris Economaki
1993	February 14	Daytona 500	Daytona	CBS	Live	Ken Squier	Ned Jarrett; Neil Bonnett	Mike Joy; David Hobbs	Chris Economaki
1993	June 20	Miller Genuine Draft 400	Michigan	CBS	Live	Ken Squier	Ned Jarrett; Neil Bonnett	Mike Joy; David Hobbs	—N/a
1993	July 25	DieHard 500	Talladega	CBS	Live	Ken Squier	Ned Jarrett; Neil Bonnett (Note: The 1993 DieHard 500 saw Neil Bonnett drive in this race, making his first start since his sidling crash at Darlington in March of 1990. He crashed in spectacular fashion and joined Ken Squier and Ned Jarrett for the finish of the race.)	Mike Joy; David Hobbs	—N/a
1994	February 13	Busch Clash	Daytona	CBS	Live	Ken Squier	Ned Jarrett	Mike Joy	Chris Economaki
1994	February 17	Gatorade Twin 125s	Daytona	CBS	Highlights	Ken Squier	Ned Jarrett; Chris Economaki	Mike Joy; David Hobbs	Chris Economaki
1994	February 20	Daytona 500	Daytona	CBS	Live	Ken Squier	Ned Jarrett; Chris Economaki	Mike Joy; David Hobbs	Chris Economaki
1994	June 19	Miller Genuine Draft 400	Michigan	CBS	Live	Ken Squier	Ned Jarrett	Mike Joy; David Hobbs; Dick Berggren	—N/a
1994	July 24	DieHard 500	Talladega	CBS	Live	Ken Squier	Ned Jarrett; Richard Petty	Mike Joy; David Hobbs; Dick Berggren	—N/a
1995	February 12	Busch Clash	Daytona	CBS	Live	Ken Squier	Ned Jarrett; Darrell Waltrip	Mike Joy; David Hobbs	—N/a
1995	February 16	Gatorade Twin 125s	Daytona	CBS	Highlights	Ken Squier	Ned Jarrett	Mike Joy; David Hobbs; Dick Berggren	—N/a
1995	February 19	Daytona 500	Daytona	CBS	Live	Ken Squier	Ned Jarrett; Richard Petty	Mike Joy; David Hobbs; Dick Berggren	—N/a
1995	June 18	Miller Genuine Draft 400	Michigan	CBS	Live	Ken Squier	Ned Jarrett; Richard Petty	Mike Joy; David Hobbs; Dick Berggren	—N/a
1995	July 23	DieHard 500	Talladega	CBS	Live	Ken Squier	Ned Jarrett; Richard Petty	Mike Joy; David Hobbs; Dick Berggren	—N/a
1996	February 11	Busch Clash	Daytona	CBS	Live	Ken Squier	Ned Jarrett; Kenny Wallace	Mike Joy; Dick Berggren	—N/a
1996	February 15	Gatorade Twin 125s	Daytona	CBS	Highlights	Ken Squier	Ned Jarrett; Buddy Baker	Mike Joy; David Hobbs; Dick Berggren	—N/a
1996	February 18	Daytona 500	Daytona	CBS	Live	Ken Squier	Ned Jarrett; Buddy Baker	Mike Joy; David Hobbs; Dick Berggren	—N/a
1996	June 23	Miller 400	Michigan	CBS	Live	Ken Squier	Ned Jarrett; Buddy Baker	Mike Joy; David Hobbs; Dick Berggren	—N/a
1996	July 28	DieHard 500	Talladega	CBS	Delayed (Note: The 1996 DieHard 500 had a three hour Rain delay and CBS switched to Golf, Race was aired on CBS in its entirety on August 4th.)	Ken Squier	Ned Jarrett; Buddy Baker	Mike Joy; David Hobbs; Dick Berggren	—N/a
1997	February 9	Busch Clash	Daytona	CBS	Live	Ken Squier	Ned Jarrett; Darrell Waltrip	Mike Joy; Dick Berggren	—N/a
1997	February 13	Gatorade 125's	Daytona	CBS	Highlights	Ken Squier	Ned Jarrett; Buddy Baker	Mike Joy; Dick Berggren; Ralph Sheheen	—N/a
1997	February 16	Daytona 500	Daytona	CBS	Live	Ken Squier	Ned Jarrett; Buddy Baker	Mike Joy; Dick Berggren; Ralph Sheheen	—N/a
1997	April 6	Interstate Batteries 500	Texas	CBS	Live	Ken Squier	Ned Jarrett; Buddy Baker	Mike Joy; Dick Berggren; Ralph Sheheen	—N/a
1997	June 15	Miller 400	Michigan	CBS	Live	Ken Squier	Ned Jarrett; Buddy Baker	Mike Joy; Dick Berggren; Ralph Sheheen	—N/a
1997	October 12	DieHard 500	Talladega	CBS	Live	Mike Joy	Ned Jarrett; Buddy Baker	Dick Berggren; Ralph Sheheen; Bill Stephens	Ken Squier
1998	February 8	Bud Shootout	Daytona	CBS	Live	Mike Joy	Ned Jarrett; Buddy Baker	Dick Berggren; Ralph Sheheen; Bill Stephens	Ken Squier
1998	February 12	Gatorade 125's	Daytona	CBS	Delayed	Mike Joy	Ned Jarrett; Buddy Baker	Dick Berggren; Ralph Sheheen; Bill Stephens	Ken Squier
1998	February 15	Daytona 500	Daytona	CBS	Live	Mike Joy	Ned Jarrett; Buddy Baker	Dick Berggren; Ralph Sheheen; Bill Stephens	Ken Squier
1998	April 5	Texas 500	Texas	CBS	Live	Mike Joy	Ned Jarrett; Buddy Baker	Dick Berggren; Ralph Sheheen; Bill Stephens	Ken Squier
1998	June 14	Miller Lite 400	Michigan	CBS	Live	Mike Joy	Ned Jarrett; Buddy Baker	Dick Berggren; Ralph Sheheen; Bill Stephens	Ken Squier
1998	~~July 4~~	~~Pepsi 400~~	~~Daytona~~	~~CBS~~	~~Live~~ (Note: The 1998 Pepsi 400 was scheduled to be held on July 4th but the 1998 Florida wildfires occurred. At 10am on July 2, NASCAR announced that the race was being postponed and the decision was made to reschedule the race for October 17, to allow additional time for the wildfires to be controlled. The rescheduling meant that the race would not be televised on CBS, as the network did not want to compete against Fox's broadcast of Game 1 of the Major League Baseball World Series which was held the same day. TNN took over broadcasting the race with their own crew.)	~~Mike Joy~~	~~Ned Jarrett~~; ~~Buddy Baker~~	~~Dick Berggren~~; ~~Ralph Sheheen~~; ~~Bill Stephens~~	~~Ken Squier~~
1999	February 7	Bud Shootout	Daytona	CBS	Live	Mike Joy	Ned Jarrett; Darrell Waltrip	Dick Berggren; Ralph Sheheen; Bill Stephens	Ken Squier
1999	February 11	Gatorade 125's	Daytona	CBS	Delayed	Mike Joy	Ned Jarrett; Buddy Baker	Dick Berggren; Ralph Sheheen; Bill Stephens	Ken Squier; Greg Gumbel
1999	February 14	Daytona 500	Daytona	CBS	Live	Mike Joy	Ned Jarrett; Buddy Baker	Dick Berggren; Ralph Sheheen; Bill Stephens	Ken Squier; Greg Gumbel
1999	March 28	Primestar 500	Texas	CBS	Live	Mike Joy	Ned Jarrett; Buddy Baker	Dick Berggren; Ralph Sheheen; Bill Stephens	Ken Squier
1999	June 13	Kmart 400	Michigan	CBS	Live	Mike Joy	Ned Jarrett; Buddy Baker	Dick Berggren; Ralph Sheheen; Bill Stephens	Ken Squier
1999	July 3	Pepsi 400	Daytona	CBS	Live	Mike Joy	Ned Jarrett; Buddy Baker	Dick Berggren; Ralph Sheheen; Bill Stephens	Ken Squier; Greg Gumbel
2000	February 13	Bud Shootout	Daytona	CBS	Live	Mike Joy	Ned Jarrett; Buddy Baker	Dick Berggren; Ralph Sheheen; Bill Stephens	Ken Squier
2000	February 17	Gatorade 125's	Daytona	CBS	Delayed	Mike Joy	Ned Jarrett; Buddy Baker	Dick Berggren; Ralph Sheheen; Bill Stephens	Ken Squier
2000	February 20	Daytona 500	Daytona	CBS	Live	Mike Joy	Ned Jarrett; Buddy Baker	Dick Berggren; Ralph Sheheen; Bill Stephens	Ken Squier
2000	April 2	DirecTV 500	Texas	CBS	Live	Mike Joy	Ned Jarrett; Buddy Baker	Dick Berggren; Ralph Sheheen; Bill Stephens	Ken Squier
2000	June 11	Kmart 400	Michigan	CBS; TNN	Live (Note: The 2000 Kmart 400 saw coverage start on CBS but move to TNN after two rain delays and CBS needed to air the SBC Senior Open. TNN used CBS's graphics and commentary for the rest of the race.)	Mike Joy	Ned Jarrett; Buddy Baker	Dick Berggren; Ralph Sheheen; Bill Stephens	Ken Squier
2000	July 1	Pepsi 400	Daytona	CBS	Live	Mike Joy	Ned Jarrett; Buddy Baker	Dick Berggren; Ralph Sheheen; Bill Stephens	Ken Squier

==== Xfinity ====
Year	Date	Event	Track	Network	Coverage	Commentary		Pit Reporters
Year	Date	Event	Track	Network	Coverage	Lap-by-lap	Color	Pit Reporters
1995	June 25	Lysol 200	Watkins Glen	CBS	Live	Ken Squier	Ned Jarrett; Kenny Wallace	Mike Joy; Dick Berggren
1995	November 5	Jiffy Lube Miami 300	Homestead–Miami	CBS	Live	Ken Squier	Ned Jarrett; Geoff Bodine	Mike Joy; Dick Berggren
1996	June 30	Lysol 200	Watkins Glen	CBS	Live	Ken Squier	Ned Jarrett; Larry McReynolds	Dick Berggren; Bill Stephens
1996	July 27	Humminbird Fishfinder 500K	Talladega	CBS	Live	Ken Squier	Ned Jarrett; Darrell Waltrip	Mike Joy; David Hobbs; Dick Berggren
1996	November 3	Jiffy Lube Miami 300	Homestead–Miami	CBS	Live	Ken Squier	Ned Jarrett; Larry McReynolds	Dick Berggren; Ralph Sheheen
1997	February 15	Gargoyles 300	Daytona	CBS	Live	Ken Squier	Ned Jarrett; Darrell Waltrip	Mike Joy; Dick Berggren; Ralph Sheheen
1997	April 5	Coca-Cola 300	Texas	CBS	Live	Ken Squier	Ned Jarrett; Darrell Waltrip	Mike Joy; Dick Berggren; Ralph Sheheen
1997	July 6	Sears Auto Center 250	Milwaukee	CBS	Live	Mike Joy	Ned Jarrett; Buddy Baker	Dick Berggren; Ralph Sheheen
1997	July 26	Gateway 300	Gateway	CBS	Live	Ken Squier	Ned Jarrett; Buddy Baker	Dick Berggren; Ralph Sheheen
1997	November 9	Jiffy Lube Miami 300	Homestead–Miami	CBS	Live	Mike Joy	Ned Jarrett; Larry McReynolds	Dick Berggren; Ralph Sheheen
1998	February 15	NAPA Auto Parts 300	Daytona	CBS	Live	Mike Joy	Ned Jarrett; Buddy Baker	Dick Berggren; Ralph Sheheen; Bill Stephens
1998	April 5	Coca-Cola 300	Texas	CBS	Live	Mike Joy	Ned Jarrett; Buddy Baker	Dick Berggren; Ralph Sheheen; Bill Stephens
1998	October 17	Carquest Auto Parts 250	Gateway	CBS	Live	Mike Joy	Ned Jarrett	Ralph Sheheen; Bill Stephens
1999	February 13	NAPA Auto Parts 300	Daytona	CBS	Live	Mike Joy	Ned Jarrett; Buddy Baker	Dick Berggren; Ralph Sheheen; Bill Stephens
1999	March 27	Coca-Cola 300	Texas	CBS; TNN	Live (Note: The 1999 Coca-Cola 300 saw coverage move from CBS to TNN due to a rain delay. TNN used CBS's graphics and commentary for the rest of the race.)	Mike Joy	Ned Jarrett; Buddy Baker	Dick Berggren; Ralph Sheheen; Bill Stephens
1999	April 3	BellSouth Mobility 320	Nashville	CBS	Live	Mike Joy	Ned Jarrett; Buddy Baker	Dick Berggren; Ralph Sheheen
2000	February 19	NAPA Auto Parts 300	Daytona	CBS	Live	Mike Joy	Ned Jarrett; Buddy Baker	Dick Berggren; Ralph Sheheen; Bill Stephens
2000	April 1	Albertsons 300	Texas	CBS	Live	Mike Joy	Ned Jarrett; Buddy Baker	Dick Berggren; Ralph Sheheen; Bill Stephens
2000	July 2	Sears DieHard 250	Milwaukee	CBS	Live	Eli Gold	Buddy Baker; Jerry Glanville	Glenn Jarrett; Steve Byrnes

==== Truck ====
Year	Date	Event	Track	Network	Coverage	Commentary		Pit Reporters
Year	Date	Event	Track	Network	Coverage	Lap-by-lap	Color	Pit Reporters
1995	July 1	Sears Auto Center 125	Milwaukee	CBS	Live	Ken Squier	Ned Jarrett; Kenny Wallace	Mike Joy; Dick Berggren
1995	July 15	Total Petroleum 200	Colorado	CBS	Live	Ken Squier	Ned Jarrett	Mike Joy; Dick Berggren
1996	June 1	Colorado 250	Colorado	CBS	Live	Ken Squier	Ned Jarrett	Mike Joy; Dick Berggren
1996	June 30	DeVilbiss Superfinish 200	Nazareth	CBS; TNN	Live	Mike Joy	Buddy Baker	Glenn Jarrett
1996	July 6	Sears Auto Center 200	Milwaukee	CBS	Live	Ken Squier	Ned Jarrett; Buddy Baker	Mike Joy; Dick Berggren
1996	July 20	Ford Dealers 225	Louisville	CBS	Live	Ken Squier	Ned Jarrett; Buddy Baker	Mike Joy; Dick Berggren
1996	November 3	Carquest 420K	Las Vegas	CBS	Live	Mike Joy	Buddy Baker	Glenn Jarrett; Bill Stephens
1997	June 29	NAPA AutoCare 200	Nazareth	CBS	Live	Mike Joy	Ned Jarrett; Buddy Baker	Dick Berggren; Ralph Sheheen
1997	July 5	Sears DieHard 200	Milwaukee	CBS	Live	Eli Gold	Ned Jarrett; Buddy Baker	Mike Joy; Dick Berggren
1997	July 12	Link-Belt Construction Equipment 225	Louisville	CBS	Live	Mike Joy	Ned Jarrett; Buddy Baker	Dick Berggren; Ralph Sheheen
1997	July 19	Colorado 250 By Snap-On Tools	Colorado	CBS	Live	Mike Joy	Ned Jarrett; Buddy Baker	Dick Berggren; Bill Stephens
1997	November 9	Carquest Auto Parts 420K	Las Vegas	CBS	Live	Eli Gold	Buddy Baker	Glenn Jarrett; Bill Stephens
1998	July 4	DieHard 200	Milwaukee	CBS	Live	Eli Gold	Buddy Baker; Randy LaJoie	Glenn Jarrett; Steve Byrnes
1998	July 11	NAPA AutoCare 200	Nazareth	CBS	Live	Mike Joy	Ned Jarrett	Ralph Sheheen; Bill Stephens
1998	July 25	Tempus Resorts 300K	Pikes Peak	CBS	Live	Mike Joy	Ned Jarrett; Buddy Baker	Dick Berggren; Ralph Sheheen
1999	July 3	DieHard 200	Milwaukee	CBS	Live	Eli Gold	Rick Carelli	Glenn Jarrett; Steve Byrnes
1999	July 10	Federated Auto Parts 250	Nashville	CBS	Live	Mike Joy	Ned Jarrett	
1999	July 18	NAPA AutoCare 200	Nazareth	CBS	Live	Mike Joy	Ned Jarrett; Buddy Baker	Dick Berggren; Ralph Sheheen
2000	July 1	Sears DieHard 200	Milwaukee	CBS	Live	Eli Gold	Jerry Glanville	Glenn Jarrett; Steve Byrnes
2000	July 8	thatlook.com 200	New Hampshire	CBS	Live	Mike Joy	Ned Jarrett; Buddy Baker	Dick Berggren; Ralph Sheheen
2000	July 15	Chevy Silverado 200	Nazareth	CBS	Live	Mike Joy	Ned Jarrett; Buddy Baker	Dick Berggren; Ralph Sheheen

=== Former commentators ===
- Buddy Baker – color commentator (1996–2000)
- Dick Berggren – pit reporter (1994–2000)
- Neil Bonnett – color commentator (1990–1993)
- Dave Despain – pit reporter (1987–1991)
- Chris Economaki – color commentator/pit reporter (1984–1994)
- Eli Gold – lap-by-lap commentator
- Jerry Glanville – analyst
- Greg Gumbel – anchor (1999 Daytona 500 and Pepsi 400 only) (1999)
- David Hobbs – color commentator/pit reporter (1979-1996)
- Ned Jarrett – pit reporter (1979-1984) / color commentator (1984-2000)
- Mike Joy – pit reporter (1983–1997) / lap-by-lap commentator (1997–2000) (Now with Fox Sports)
- Randy Pemberton – pit reporter (covered pit road for the 1992 DieHard 500 at Talladega)
- Richard Petty – color commentator (1994-1995)
- Ralph Sheheen – pit reporter (1997-2000)
- Bill Stephens – pit reporter (1997-2000)
- Ken Squier – lap-by-lap announcer (1979–1997) / studio anchor beginning with the 1997 DieHard 500 at Talladega. (1997–2000)
- Darrell Waltrip – color commentator (NASCAR Craftsman Truck Series races, 1995 & 1997 Busch Clash's, and 1999 Bud Shootout only) (now with Fox Sports)
- Brock Yates – pit reporter (1979-1982)

== Notes ==
Preceded by ABC	Daytona 500 television broadcaster 1979–2000	Succeeded by Fox (odd numbered years) and NBC (even numbered years)
Preceded by None	NASCAR pay television carrier in the United States; 1979–2000 (shared with TBS, ABC/ESPN; and TNN)	Succeeded by Fox
