= 1996 DieHard 500 =

18th race of the 1996 NASCAR Winston Cup Series

Race details
- Race 18 of 31 in the 1996 NASCAR Winston Cup Series
- The 1996 DieHard 500 program cover, featuring Sterling Marlin.
- Date: July 28, 1996
- Official name: 28th Annual DieHard 500
- Location: Lincoln, Alabama, Talladega Superspeedway
- Course: Permanent racing facility
- Course length: 2.66 miles (4.28 km)
- Distance: 129 laps, 343.14 mi (552.230 km)
- Scheduled distance: 188 laps, 500.08 mi (804.8 km)
- Average speed: 133.387 miles per hour (214.666 km/h)
- Attendance: 100,000

Pole position
Driver	Jeremy Mayfield	Cale Yarborough Motorsports
- Time: 49.779

Most laps led
Driver	Dale Earnhardt	Richard Childress Racing
- Laps: 40

Winner
No. 24	Jeff Gordon	Hendrick Motorsports

Television in the United States
- Network: CBS
- Announcers: Ken Squier, Ned Jarrett, Buddy Baker

Radio in the United States
- Radio: Motor Racing Network

The 1996 DieHard 500 was the 18th stock car race of the 1996 NASCAR Winston Cup Series and the 28th iteration of the event. The race was held on Sunday, July 28, 1996, before an audience of 100,000 in Lincoln, Alabama at Talladega Superspeedway, a 2.66 miles (4.28 km) permanent triangle-shaped superspeedway. The race was shortened from its scheduled 188 laps to 129 laps due to darkness caused by rain delays and lengthy crash cleanups. At race's end, Hendrick Motorsports driver Jeff Gordon would manage to avoid numerous crashes and stay in front when the race was eventually called to take his 15th career NASCAR Winston Cup Series and his sixth victory of the season. To fill out the top three, Robert Yates Racing driver Dale Jarrett and Roush Racing driver Mark Martin would finish second and third, respectively.

On lap 117, a major crash involving 13 drivers, including the drivers of Dale Earnhardt and Sterling Marlin, would occur on the track's frontstretch. Marlin would be spun by hitting Ernie Irvan's front bumper, sending him into Earnhardt. Earnhardt would proceed to crash violently into the outside wall, sending Earnhardt into a flip before landing on all four wheels. In the midst of the chaos, others would be involved in the accident, with many placing blame on Irvan and Marlin for the crash. In the process, Earnhardt would be transported to the Carraway Methodist Medical Center in Birmingham, Alabama where he was diagnosed with a broken sternum and a broken left collarbone.

== Background ==
The layout of Talladega Superspeedway, the venue where the race was held.

Talladega Superspeedway, originally known as Alabama International Motor Superspeedway (AIMS), is a motorsports complex located north of Talladega, Alabama. It is located on the former Anniston Air Force Base in the small city of Lincoln. The track is a tri-oval and was constructed in the 1960s by the International Speedway Corporation, a business controlled by the France family. Talladega is most known for its steep banking and the unique location of the start/finish line that's located just past the exit to pit road. The track currently hosts the NASCAR series such as the NASCAR Cup Series, Xfinity Series and the Camping World Truck Series. Talladega is the longest NASCAR oval with a length of 2.66-mile-long (4.28 km) tri-oval like the Daytona International Speedway, which also is a 2.5-mile-long (4.0 km) tri-oval.

=== Entry list ===
- (R) denotes rookie driver.

#	Driver	Team	Make
1	Rick Mast	Precision Products Racing	Pontiac
2	Rusty Wallace	Penske Racing South	Ford
3	Dale Earnhardt	Richard Childress Racing	Chevrolet
4	Sterling Marlin	Morgan–McClure Motorsports	Chevrolet
5	Terry Labonte	Hendrick Motorsports	Chevrolet
6	Mark Martin	Roush Racing	Ford
7	Geoff Bodine	Geoff Bodine Racing	Ford
8	Hut Stricklin	Stavola Brothers Racing	Ford
9	Lake Speed	Melling Racing	Ford
10	Ricky Rudd	Rudd Performance Motorsports	Ford
11	Brett Bodine	Brett Bodine Racing	Ford
12	Derrike Cope	Bobby Allison Motorsports	Ford
15	Wally Dallenbach Jr.	Bud Moore Engineering	Ford
16	Ted Musgrave	Roush Racing	Ford
17	Darrell Waltrip	Darrell Waltrip Motorsports	Chevrolet
18	Bobby Labonte	Joe Gibbs Racing	Chevrolet
19	Loy Allen Jr.	TriStar Motorsports	Ford
21	Michael Waltrip	Wood Brothers Racing	Ford
22	Ward Burton	Bill Davis Racing	Pontiac
23	Jimmy Spencer	Haas-Carter Motorsports	Ford
24	Jeff Gordon	Hendrick Motorsports	Chevrolet
25	Ken Schrader	Hendrick Motorsports	Chevrolet
28	Ernie Irvan	Robert Yates Racing	Ford
29	Greg Sacks	Diamond Ridge Motorsports	Chevrolet
30	Johnny Benson Jr. (R)	Bahari Racing	Pontiac
33	Robert Pressley	Leo Jackson Motorsports	Chevrolet
37	Jeremy Mayfield	Kranefuss-Haas Racing	Ford
41	Ricky Craven	Larry Hedrick Motorsports	Chevrolet
42	Kyle Petty	Team SABCO	Pontiac
43	Bobby Hamilton	Petty Enterprises	Pontiac
44	Jeff Purvis	Phoenix Racing	Chevrolet
71	Dave Marcis	Marcis Auto Racing	Chevrolet
75	Morgan Shepherd	Butch Mock Motorsports	Ford
77	Bobby Hillin Jr.	Jasper Motorsports	Ford
81	Kenny Wallace	FILMAR Racing	Ford
87	Joe Nemechek	NEMCO Motorsports	Chevrolet
88	Dale Jarrett	Robert Yates Racing	Ford
90	Dick Trickle	Donlavey Racing	Ford
94	Bill Elliott	Bill Elliott Racing	Ford
95	Gary Bradberry	Sadler Brothers Racing	Ford
97	Chad Little	Mark Rypien Motorsports	Pontiac
98	Jeremy Mayfield	Cale Yarborough Motorsports	Ford
99	Jeff Burton	Roush Racing	Ford

== Qualifying ==
Qualifying was originally scheduled split into two rounds. The first round was held on Friday, July 26, at 4:00 PM EST. Each driver would have one lap to set a time. During the first round, the top 25 drivers in the round would be guaranteed a starting spot in the race. However, on Saturday, July 27, rain would eventually force the cancellation of second-round qualifying, and the decision was made that positions 26-38 would be determined by their first round qualifying speeds and depending on who needed it, a select amount of positions were given to cars who had not otherwise qualified but were high enough in owner's points; up to four provisionals were given. If needed, a past champion who did not qualify on either time or provisionals could use a champion's provisional, adding one more spot to the field.

Jeremy Mayfield, driving for Cale Yarborough Motorsports, would win the pole, setting a time of 49.779 and an average speed of 192.370 miles per hour (309.590 km/h) in the first round.

Chad Little was the only driver to fail to qualify.

=== Full qualifying results ===
Pos.	#	Driver	Team	Make	Time	Speed
1	98	Jeremy Mayfield	Cale Yarborough Motorsports	Ford	49.779	192.370
2	24	Jeff Gordon	Hendrick Motorsports	Chevrolet	50.027	191.417
3	88	Dale Jarrett	Robert Yates Racing	Ford	50.113	191.088
4	3	Dale Earnhardt	Richard Childress Racing	Chevrolet	50.187	190.806
5	9	Lake Speed	Melling Racing	Ford	50.262	190.522
6	28	Ernie Irvan	Robert Yates Racing	Ford	50.291	190.412
7	99	Jeff Burton	Roush Racing	Ford	50.315	190.321
8	6	Mark Martin	Roush Racing	Ford	50.411	189.959
9	17	Darrell Waltrip	Darrell Waltrip Motorsports	Chevrolet	50.423	189.913
10	30	Johnny Benson Jr. (R)	Bahari Racing	Pontiac	50.467	189.748
11	90	Dick Trickle	Donlavey Racing	Ford	50.472	189.729
12	81	Kenny Wallace	FILMAR Racing	Ford	50.514	189.571
13	1	Rick Mast	Precision Products Racing	Pontiac	50.546	189.451
14	33	Robert Pressley	Leo Jackson Motorsports	Chevrolet	50.598	189.256
15	23	Jimmy Spencer	Travis Carter Enterprises	Ford	50.603	189.238
16	4	Sterling Marlin	Morgan–McClure Motorsports	Chevrolet	50.620	189.174
17	16	Ted Musgrave	Roush Racing	Ford	50.645	189.081
18	42	Kyle Petty	Team SABCO	Pontiac	50.654	189.047
19	37	John Andretti	Kranefuss-Haas Racing	Ford	50.654	189.047
20	44	Jeff Purvis	Phoenix Racing	Chevrolet	50.661	189.021
21	71	Dave Marcis	Marcis Auto Racing	Chevrolet	50.709	188.842
22	21	Michael Waltrip	Wood Brothers Racing	Ford	50.723	188.790
23	12	Derrike Cope	Bobby Allison Motorsports	Ford	50.735	188.745
24	18	Bobby Labonte	Joe Gibbs Racing	Chevrolet	50.736	188.742
25	8	Hut Stricklin	Stavola Brothers Racing	Ford	50.737	188.738
26	25	Ken Schrader	Hendrick Motorsports	Chevrolet	50.769	188.619
27	41	Ricky Craven	Larry Hedrick Motorsports	Chevrolet	50.779	188.582
28	10	Ricky Rudd	Rudd Performance Motorsports	Ford	50.809	188.471
29	5	Terry Labonte	Hendrick Motorsports	Chevrolet	50.847	188.330
30	77	Bobby Hillin Jr.	Jasper Motorsports	Ford	50.866	188.259
31	19	Loy Allen Jr.	TriStar Motorsports	Ford	50.877	188.219
32	2	Rusty Wallace	Penske Racing South	Ford	50.902	188.126
33	22	Ward Burton	Bill Davis Racing	Pontiac	50.908	188.104
34	29	Greg Sacks	Diamond Ridge Motorsports	Chevrolet	50.925	188.041
35	15	Wally Dallenbach Jr.	Bud Moore Engineering	Ford	50.949	187.953
36	75	Morgan Shepherd	Butch Mock Motorsports	Ford	50.957	187.923
37	43	Bobby Hamilton	Petty Enterprises	Pontiac	50.982	187.831
38	95	Gary Bradberry	Sadler Brothers Racing	Ford	51.008	187.735
Provisionals
39	94	Bill Elliott	Bill Elliott Racing	Ford	51.447	186.133
40	7	Geoff Bodine	Geoff Bodine Racing	Ford	51.055	187.562
41	11	Brett Bodine	Brett Bodine Racing	Ford	51.064	187.529
42	87	Joe Nemechek	NEMCO Motorsports	Chevrolet	51.104	187.383
Failed to qualify
43	97	Chad Little	Mark Rypien Motorsports	Pontiac	51.155	187.196
Official first round qualifying results
Official starting lineup

== Race ==
=== Rain Delay ===
The race was due to start at 12:15pm CST but rain delayed the start time to 3:35pm and ran eleven laps before rain red flagged the race at 4:09pm with the race restarting at 4:32pm and the race starting at 4:36pm on lap thirteen.

=== The Big Ones ===
==== Lap 103 ====
John Andretti tried to get inside of Dale Jarrett but Andretti who had a loose car all day spun and collected Brett Bodine, Ricky Rudd, Joe Nemechek had a flat tyre but was able to continue.

==== Lap 116 ====
On lap 116, Earnhardt was leading with Marlin on his outside and Irvan behind him, the big one happened when Irvan got into Marlin which led him to turn into Earnhardt. Earnhardt was hit in the roof by Derrike Cope and on the side by Robert Pressley. The accident also collected Terry Labonte, Mark Martin, Lake Speed, Brett Bodine, Wally Dallenbach, Jr., Ward Burton, Ken Schrader, Greg Sacks and Ricky Craven. Martin had a puncture and Irvan had right front fender damage but both stayed on the lead lap, Craven fell a lap down and Bodine fell three laps down. The race was red flagged on lap 118 to clear up the cars of Earnhardt, Marlin, Pressley, Labonte, Speed, Burton, Schrader, Craven, and Dallenbach, Jr did not restart the race. Earnhardt was then sent to hospital with a broken collarbone and sternum.

=== Finish ===
With light fading, NASCAR elected to shorten the race with a five lap shootout from the green flag on lap 125. Gordon would win from Jarrett. The race would be completed by 7:05pm

=== Race results ===
Fin	St	#	Driver	Team	Make	Laps	Led	Status	Pts	Winnings
1	2	24	Jeff Gordon	Hendrick Motorsports	Chevrolet	129	37	running	180	$272,550
2	3	88	Dale Jarrett	Robert Yates Racing	Ford	129	5	running	175	$55,070
3	8	6	Mark Martin	Roush Racing	Ford	129	7	running	170	$53,980
4	6	28	Ernie Irvan	Robert Yates Racing	Ford	129	1	running	165	$44,455
5	15	23	Jimmy Spencer	Travis Carter Enterprises	Ford	129	0	running	155	$50,025
6	40	7	Geoff Bodine	Geoff Bodine Racing	Ford	129	0	running	150	$40,175
7	7	99	Jeff Burton	Roush Racing	Ford	129	0	running	146	$23,475
8	24	18	Bobby Labonte	Joe Gibbs Racing	Chevrolet	129	0	running	142	$33,425
9	9	17	Darrell Waltrip	Darrell Waltrip Motorsports	Chevrolet	129	0	running	138	$27,795
10	32	2	Rusty Wallace	Penske Racing South	Ford	129	0	running	134	$31,925
11	21	71	Dave Marcis	Marcis Auto Racing	Chevrolet	129	3	running	135	$19,955
12	18	42	Kyle Petty	Team SABCO	Pontiac	129	0	running	127	$26,575
13	39	94	Bill Elliott	Bill Elliott Racing	Ford	129	0	running	124	$26,255
14	36	75	Morgan Shepherd	Butch Mock Motorsports	Ford	129	0	running	121	$18,985
15	42	87	Joe Nemechek	NEMCO Motorsports	Chevrolet	129	0	running	118	$26,710
16	1	98	Jeremy Mayfield	Cale Yarborough Motorsports	Ford	129	12	running	120	$24,375
17	37	43	Bobby Hamilton	Petty Enterprises	Pontiac	128	0	running	112	$25,110
18	10	30	Johnny Benson Jr. (R)	Bahari Racing	Pontiac	128	0	running	109	$25,905
19	27	41	Ricky Craven	Larry Hedrick Motorsports	Chevrolet	128	0	running	106	$24,625
20	12	81	Kenny Wallace	FILMAR Racing	Ford	127	0	running	103	$19,085
21	31	19	Loy Allen Jr.	TriStar Motorsports	Ford	126	0	running	100	$17,005
22	41	11	Brett Bodine	Brett Bodine Racing	Ford	126	0	running	97	$23,595
23	38	95	Gary Bradberry	Sadler Brothers Racing	Ford	121	0	running	94	$13,495
24	29	5	Terry Labonte	Hendrick Motorsports	Chevrolet	120	0	crash	91	$29,715
25	34	29	Greg Sacks	Diamond Ridge Motorsports	Chevrolet	119	0	crash	88	$23,335
26	26	25	Ken Schrader	Hendrick Motorsports	Chevrolet	119	0	crash	85	$23,060
27	23	12	Derrike Cope	Bobby Allison Motorsports	Ford	117	0	crash	82	$22,490
28	4	3	Dale Earnhardt	Richard Childress Racing	Chevrolet	117	40	crash	89	$31,020
29	16	4	Sterling Marlin	Morgan–McClure Motorsports	Chevrolet	117	19	crash	81	$29,450
30	5	9	Lake Speed	Melling Racing	Ford	117	0	crash	73	$19,830
31	14	33	Robert Pressley	Leo Jackson Motorsports	Chevrolet	117	1	crash	75	$19,690
32	35	15	Wally Dallenbach Jr.	Bud Moore Engineering	Ford	117	0	crash	67	$19,620
33	33	22	Ward Burton	Bill Davis Racing	Pontiac	117	0	crash	64	$27,540
34	25	8	Hut Stricklin	Stavola Brothers Racing	Ford	114	0	running	61	$12,495
35	30	77	Bobby Hillin Jr.	Jasper Motorsports	Ford	113	0	running	58	$12,465
36	17	16	Ted Musgrave	Roush Racing	Ford	113	0	running	55	$19,420
37	28	10	Ricky Rudd	Rudd Performance Motorsports	Ford	113	0	running	52	$27,406
38	11	90	Dick Trickle	Donlavey Racing	Ford	109	0	crash	49	$12,250
39	19	37	John Andretti	Kranefuss-Haas Racing	Ford	102	4	crash	51	$19,250
40	20	44	Jeff Purvis	Phoenix Racing	Chevrolet	86	0	engine	43	$12,250
41	13	1	Rick Mast	Precision Products Racing	Pontiac	85	0	running	40	$19,250
42	22	21	Michael Waltrip	Wood Brothers Racing	Ford	16	0	engine	37	$19,250
Failed to qualify
43		97	Chad Little	Mark Rypien Motorsports	Pontiac					
Official race results

== Media ==
=== Television ===
The Diehard 500 was covered by CBS in the United States. Ken Squier, two-time NASCAR Cup Series champion Ned Jarrett and 1975 race winner Buddy Baker called the race from the broadcast booth. Mike Joy, David Hobbs and Dick Berggren handled pit road for the television side. Due to the rain delay, CBS aired Golf instead but aired the race as an abridge broadcast on August 4, the day after the 1996 Brickyard 400. This would be the last race David Hobbs would work with CBS as he would leave for Speedvision to cover their Formula One races.

CBS
Booth announcers		Pit reporters
Lap-by-lap	Color-commentators	Pit reporters
Ken Squier	Ned Jarrett; Buddy Baker	Mike Joy; David Hobbs; Dick Berggren

Previous race: 1996 Miller 500 (Pocono)	NASCAR Winston Cup Series; 1996 season	Next race: 1996 Brickyard 400
