= 1981 World 600 =

Auto race held at Charlotte Motor Speedway in 1981

Race details
- Race 13 of 31 in the 1981 NASCAR Winston Cup Series
- Date: May 24, 1981
- Location: Charlotte Motor Speedway, Concord, North Carolina
- Course: Permanent racing facility
- Course length: 1.5 miles (2.4 km)
- Distance: 400 laps, 600 mi (965.606 km)
- Weather: Temperatures averaging around 72.6 °F (22.6 °C); wind speeds up to 11.6 miles per hour (18.7 km/h)
- Average speed: 129.326 mph (208.130 km/h)

Pole position
Driver	Neil Bonnett	Wood Brothers Racing

Most laps led
Driver	Bobby Allison	Ranier-Lundy
- Laps: 140

Winner
No. 28	Bobby Allison	Ranier-Lundy

Television in the United States
- Network: CBS
- Announcers: Ken Squier & David Hobbs

The 1981 World 600, the 22nd running of the event, was a NASCAR Winston Cup Series race held on May 24, 1981 at Charlotte Motor Speedway in Charlotte, North Carolina. Contested over 400 laps on the 1.5 mile (2.4 km) speedway, it was the 13th race of the 1981 NASCAR Winston Cup Series season. Bobby Allison of Ranier-Lundy won the race.

== Background ==
Charlotte Motor Speedway is a motorsports complex located in Concord, North Carolina, United States 13 miles from Charlotte, North Carolina. The complex features a 1.5 miles (2.4 km) quad oval track that hosts NASCAR racing including the prestigious World 600 on Memorial Day weekend and the National 500. The speedway was built in 1959 by Bruton Smith and is considered the home track for NASCAR with many race teams located in the Charlotte area. The track is owned and operated by Speedway Motorsports Inc. (SMI).

== Race report ==
This race was the last Winston Cup start for 1970 Rookie of the Year Bill Dennis. Kyle Petty would get his first career top five finish.

Donnie Allison's career was effectively ended after he sustained a serious head injury when his car hit the wall on lap 146. Polesitter Neil Bonnett was the early leader but crashed trying to keep Cale Yarborough a lap down midway through the race. They were racing back to the flag when Bonnett hit a slower car on lap 210.

After Bonnett retired, Bobby Allison had the dominant car, winning by a comfortable margin over 2nd-place Harry Gant.

=== Top ten results ===
Pos	No.	Driver	Team	Manufacturer	Laps
1	28	Bobby Allison	Ranier-Lundy	Buick	140
2	33	Harry Gant	Mach 1 Racing	Chevrolet	65
3	83	Lake Speed	Speed Racing	Oldsmobile	0
4	88	Ricky Rudd	DiGard Motorsports	Buick	0
5	42	Kyle Petty	Petty Enterprises	Buick	0
6	5	Morgan Shepherd	Cliff Stewart Racing	Pontiac	0
7	6	Joe Ruttman	Jim Stacy Racing	Buick	0
8	75	Joe Millikan	RahMoc Enterprises	Chevrolet	0
9	11	Darrell Waltrip	Junior Johnson & Associates	Buick	3
10	86	Elliott Forbes-Robinson	Howard & Egerton Racing	Buick	0

== Race statistics ==
- Time of race: 4:38:22
- Average Speed: 129.326 miles per hour (208.130 km/h)
- Pole Speed: 158.115 miles per hour (254.461 km/h)
- Cautions: 7 for 50 laps
- Margin of Victory: 8.2 seconds
- Lead changes: 32
- Percent of race run under caution: 12.5%
- Average green flag run: 43.8 laps
