= 1980 World 600 =

Auto race held at Charlotte Motor Speedway in 1980

Race details
- Race 13 of 31 in the 1980 NASCAR Winston Cup Series
- Souvenir magazine cover of the 1980 World 600
- Date: May 25, 1980
- Official name: World 600
- Location: Charlotte Motor Speedway, Concord, North Carolina
- Course: Permanent racing facility
- Course length: 1.500 miles (2.414 km)
- Distance: 400 laps, 600 mi (965 km)
- Average speed: 119.265 miles per hour (191.938 km/h)
- Attendance: 135,000

Pole position
Driver	Cale Yarborough	Junior Johnson & Associates

Most laps led
Driver	Darrell Waltrip	DiGard Motorsports
- Laps: 157

Winner
No. 27	Benny Parsons	M.C. Anderson Racing

Television in the United States
- Network: CBS
- Announcers: Ken Squier; David Hobbs

The 1980 World 600, the 21st running of the event, was a NASCAR Winston Cup Series race that was held on May 25, 1980, at Charlotte Motor Speedway in Concord, North Carolina.

The race was won by Benny Parsons, driving the No. 27 Chevrolet for M.C. Anderson Racing. Darrell Waltrip finished second in the No. 88 Chevrolet, and Terry Labonte finished third. Cale Yarborough won the pole.

== Race report ==
Yarborough started from the pole position in the No. 11 Chevrolet. Parsons started sixth and went on to claim the victory, while Waltrip led the most laps of any driver, with 157.

The race was marked by frequent cautions and numerous changes for the lead. Parsons ultimately finished ahead of Waltrip to earn the victory for M.C. Anderson Racing.

== Race results ==
Finish	Start	No.	Driver	Sponsor	Manufacturer	Points	Laps	Laps led	Status
1	6	27	Benny Parsons	Melling Tool Company	Chevrolet	180	400	31	Running
2	7	88	Darrell Waltrip	Gatorade	Chevrolet	180	400	157	Running
3	11	44	Terry Labonte	Stratagraph Incorporated	Chevrolet	165	398	0	Running
4	9	43	Richard Petty	STP	Chevrolet	165	397	3	Running
5	5	21	Neil Bonnett	Purolator	Mercury	160	397	5	Running
6	2	1	David Pearson	Hawaiian Tropic	Chevrolet	155	396	13	Running
7	27	42	Kyle Petty	STP	Chevrolet	146	395	0	Running
8	35	89	Jim Vandiver	Smith Nurseries	Oldsmobile	142	394	0	Running
9	13	22	Ricky Rudd	Rudd Auto Parts	Chevrolet	138	394	0	Running
10	22	67	Buddy Arrington	Reid Trailer Sales	Dodge	134	392	0	Running
11	29	3	Richard Childress	CRC Chemicals	Chevrolet	130	390	0	Running
12	12	90	Jody Ridley	Truxmore Industries / Sunny King	Oldsmobile	127	388	0	Running
13	32	39	Blackie Wangerin	Wangerin Racing	Chevrolet	124	386	0	Running
14	36	52	Jimmy Means	Thompson Industries	Chevrolet	121	385	0	Running
15	24	7	Dick Brooks	Sanyo Electronics	Chevrolet	123	384	6	Running
16	38	5	Sterling Marlin	The 5 Racers Corporation	Oldsmobile	115	382	0	Running
17	1	11	Cale Yarborough	Busch	Chevrolet	117	379	43	Running
18	30	19	John Anderson	Belden Asphalt	Chevrolet	109	373	0	Engine
19	19	4	Connie Saylor	Mitco	Chevrolet	0	367	4	Oil pump
20	4	2	Dale Earnhardt	Mike Curb / Hodgdon	Chevrolet	108	367	105	Running
21	40	45	Baxter Price	Iron Peddlers / McWhirter	Oldsmobile	100	350	0	Running
22	42	25	Ronnie Thomas	Stone's Cafeteria	Chevrolet	97	343	0	Running
23	18	48	James Hylton	Palatine Automotive	Chevrolet	99	341	26	Running
24	28	95	Tommy Houston	Carpenter Designs	Chevrolet	91	332	0	Engine
25	41	74	Bobby Wawak	Total Systems	Oldsmobile	88	307	0	Ignition
26	8	15	Bobby Allison	Warner Hodgdon / Mike Curb	Chevrolet	85	275	0	Accident
27	37	87	Billie Harvey	Fast Lane Ltd.	Oldsmobile	0	251	0	Accident
28	16	47	Harry Gant	Race Hill Farm	Chevrolet	79	203	0	Accident
29	20	71	Dave Marcis	Buck Stove / Hudson Chevrolet	Oldsmobile	81	152	4	Steering
30	23	40	J. D. McDuffie	Ulrich Racing	Chevrolet	73	145	0	Engine
31	17	18	Donnie Allison	Briarwood Special	Chevrolet	70	134	0	Steering
32	21	53	Slick Johnson	Johnson Racing	Chevrolet	72	120	3	Engine
33	31	64	Tommy Gale	Sunny King Ford & Honda	Oldsmobile	64	101	0	Engine
34	25	75	Bill Elswick	Performance Boats	Chevrolet	61	94	0	Accident
35	39	73	Steve Moore	Tuesday's Tavern	Oldsmobile	58	86	0	Engine
36	15	30	Tighe Scott	Russ Togs	Chevrolet	55	75	0	Accident
37	34	24	Cecil Gordon	South Hill Texaco	Oldsmobile	52	72	0	Engine
38	26	50	Bruce Hill	Global Heat Exchange	Oldsmobile	49	46	0	Accident
39	3	28	Buddy Baker	Napa Regal Ride Shocks	Chevrolet	46	40	0	Ignition
40	33	68	John Greenwood	Greenwood-Koni Custom Shocks	Chevrolet	43	24	0	Accident
41	14	12	Lennie Pond	Ramey's Chevy City	Chevrolet	40	12	0	Steering
42	10	9	Bill Elliott	Dahlonega Ford Sales	Chevrolet	37	6	0	Accident

== Waylon Jennings riot ==
On May 21, 1980, following qualifying for the race, Waylon Jennings performed a concert at Charlotte Motor Speedway. The event would descend into a riot among the spectators in the grandstands after Waylon went on stage nearly an hour late, with them reportedly throwing bottles and fighting in the stands midway through the concert. The event reportedly came close to bringing down the entire frontstretch catchfence.

Busch Presents: World 600 Qualifying & Waylon Jennings in Concert
- Outdoor concert by Waylon Jennings
- Concert poster for the event
- Venue: Charlotte Motor Speedway
- Date: May 21, 1980 6:30pm EST
- Duration: 1 hour (roughly)
- Supporting acts: Reba McEntire; The Waylors
- Attendance: 30,000

1980 World 600 Qualifying Riot
- Injuries: 8
- Arrests: 3

Jennings had reportedly been in his tour bus hanging out with friends Cale Yarborough and Willie Nelson beforehand. Fans eventually ended up climbing over the fence and surging around the stage before the Hells Angels, Jennings' unofficial security detail broke them up.

A total of 8 people were injured, 3 people were arrested, and 175 riot police were called out to the scene who were unsuccessful in breaking the crowd up. Track President and Promoter Humpy Wheeler was quoted as saying "We just got the wrong mix of people. We had God-fearing, flag-waving, red-white-and-blue folks out there with the motorcycle boys." The "motorcycle boys" Wheeler was referring to was the Hells Angels, Jennings' longtime unofficial security detail.
