= WheelsTV =

Automotive Networks Corp. dba WheelsTV
- Industry: Automotive Internet, Video Production
- Headquarters: PO Box 997, 145 Main Street; Groton, Massachusetts 01450, United States
- Area served: Worldwide
- Key people: Jim Barisano, CEO
- Website: wheelstvnetwork.com

WheelsTV is a video production company, specializing in automotive media. Based in Boston and Groton, Massachusetts, WheelsTV creates and distributes original content for websites, mobile, IPTV platforms, and Video On Demand. Patent-pending products including Top200 Test Drives, 1:00 on ONE Vehicle Profiles, and POV (Pre-Owned Vehicle) Reviews. These products serve as consumer tools in the search for purchasing a vehicle.

== Distribution partners ==
WheelsTV's distribution partners include Amazon Vehicles, Covideo, DealerVision, fusionZONE, Multicom, Intellacar, Team Velocity Marketing and franchised auto dealers across North America.

== Video Lineup ==
WheelsTV's interactive video test drive report lineup is the largest in the world. Over 6,000 videos covering model years 2008 to present. Videos combine WheelsTV's original footage, shot professionally on America's roads and closed courses and OEM-sourced B roll. This footage is combined with scripts researched and written by automotive journalists, voiced by professional voice-over artists, and edited by a professional video editor. All videos are OEM compliant.

WheelsTV Video Reports

WheelsTV Video Reports provide consumers with essential vehicle purchasing information by giving car shoppers the ability to easily search, research, share and compare cars, trucks and SUV's. The run time is approximately two minutes and includes vehicle information essential to consumer purchases and ownership. Information includes vehicle specifications, fuel economy, class, size, passenger capacity, standard and optional features, safety features, and warranty information.

POVs are a subset of WheelsTV Video Reports. POVs review vehicles that are no longer in production, and are likely to be found in a pre-owned dealers' inventory. A POV video covers an entire generation of a particular vehicle and points out potential problems that might arise in each year of a generation. To create this product, available data is gathered on each vehicle including information from actual consumer experiences as reported to J.D. Power and Associates, government and private testing agencies, and independent analysts. These findings are combined with archival footage, from WheelsTV's library, OEM footage, and IIHS and NHTSA crash test data.

== Social networking ==
WheelsTV can be found on its B2B site: WheelsTVShowroom.com and on various social platforms including Facebook, YouTube, Linkedin and Twitter.
