= Bill Stephens =

American television host (born 1949)

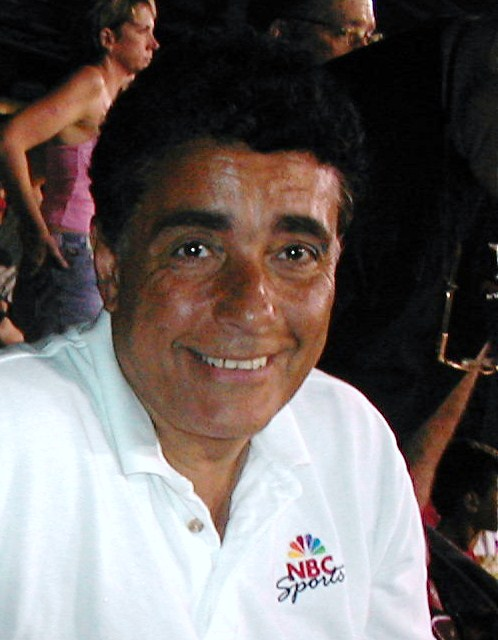
Bill Stephens

William Weyman Stephens Jr. (born October 16, 1949) is an American network television host, commentator, and narrator specializing in automotive and motorsports presentations. He is a nationally published author of several motorsports books and a columnist for a number of automotive periodicals. He is a television producer and writer for various automotive television programs, a professional vehicle appraiser, and a communications consultant providing media training for motorsports personalities and vocal and listening skills training for business people at all levels of the corporate world.

== Early life ==
Stephens, the youngest of three children and the only boy, was born in Brookline, Massachusetts to William and Claire Stephens and raised in Somerville, Massachusetts, several miles northwest of Boston. Stephens' father was a long-distance truck driver and his mother owned and managed several restaurants in the Boston area. Stephens frequently accompanied his father on various over-the-road trips as a child which helped to fuel his interest in automobiles. According to family members, at the age of three, Stephens was able to identify every make of automobile on the road before acquiring the ability to read. His parents permanently separated when he was 13 years old, and following graduation from Somerville High School in 1967, Stephens held several jobs including driving a truck, driving a taxi, making pizza, and working in local auto body shops as a body repairman and painter.

== Career ==
=== Radio ===
As a teenager, Stephens developed a fascination with radio broadcasting after seeing several remote broadcasts presented by WBZ Radio in Boston during the rock and roll era of the 1960s. In 1972, he enrolled in the Columbia School of Broadcasting, a correspondence course, and after completing the program, began his radio career at WRYT in Boston as a staff announcer and control board operator. Over the next 28 years, he served as an on-air personality at such stations as WDRC AM and FM and WCCC-FM in Hartford, CT, WRKO, WVBF-FM, WEEI-FM, WBOS-FM, and WMJX-FM in Boston, KIQQ-FM, KGIL-AM&FM, and KWST-FM in Los Angeles, California, and KMJJ-FM in Las Vegas, NV. Stephens was the last full-time air personality hired by WRKO in Boston before RKO General switched the format from Adult Contemporary to News/Talk in 1981. He was also the only music disc jockey on the airstaff to move to the new format, co-hosting WRKO's Morning Magazine program with Norm Nathan for two years.

In February 1973, Stephens was instrumental in one of the most ambitious promotional stunts in Connecticut radio history when he locked himself inside the WCCC AM&FM on-air studios in Hartford and played the Top 40 song "Bitter Bad" by Melanie for 35 consecutive hours to protest the station's reluctance to offer him a full-time job. During the promotional marathon, demonstrators assembled outside the Asylum St. facility, picketing the management of WCCC to hire Stephens. He was also interviewed on the phone during his 35-hour broadcast by Don Imus on WNBC in New York and Larry Glick on WBZ in Boston.

Stephens has been the recipient of several major broadcasting awards for his radio hosting and production, including three International Radio Festival of New York Awards in 1988–90, an Achievement in Radio Award in 1990, and National Silver Microphone Award in 1994. Stephens is the host of the nationally syndicated Time Capsule radio feature, and has been heard on such nationally broadcast radio programs as Westwood One's Focus on Racing Radio and ESPN's RPM Radio.

=== Television ===
Stephens' first appearance on television was on local cable news television in 1982 when he served as the nightly weatherman on Cape Cod Cablevision's Cape 11 Alive News in South Yarmouth. In 1984, he was chosen from over 300 applicants to become the morning VJ on the Boston-based music television station WVJV-TV (V-66), which was owned by former Boston-area disc jockeys Arnie "Woo Woo" Ginsburg and John Garabedian. In 1989, Stephens was named writer, producer, and narrator of the award-winning automotive TV series Wild About Wheels, produced at Global Television Network in Acton, MA and aired on The Discovery Channel.

In February 1994, he was hired by Diamond P Sports in Nashville, TN as associate producer and drag racing commentator for "NHRA Today" on The Nashville Network, necessitating a relocation to Nashville, TN from his home in Osterville, MA on Cape Cod. Stephens moved back to Osterville in October of that year, and after taking several radio announcer positions on Cape Cod and in Boston, he founded his own TV production company, Ultimate Garage Productions, Inc.

Stephens serves on numerous automotive and motorsports television productions as a host, commentator, automotive expert, and pit reporter and has been seen on CBS, NBC, ABC, ESPN, ESPN2, ESPN Classic, Fox, Fox Sports Net, SPEED, The Discovery Channel, Discovery HD Theater, Velocity, The Outdoor Channel, The Family Channel, and HDNet. He has covered virtually every major automobile racing series such as NASCAR, NHRA, Champ Car, and the Atlantic Championship along with many specialty automotive and motorsports events such as collector car auctions, sprint car racing, tractor pulling, drag boat racing, lawn mower racing, mud bog racing, custom car shows, automotive expos, and motorsports awards ceremonies.

In 1996, he wrote, produced, and narrated the award-winning documentary series "Wheels", aired on PBS affiliates around the country. He currently can be seen as an expert commentator on the Mecum Collector Car Auctions on ESPN+ and is the former co-host of "Bidding Wars" on ESPN2, "Appraise My Car" on ESPN2, and "What's My Car Worth" seen on the Velocity Channel. He co-hosts the series "RVing in the USA" on Motor Trend TV and has written, produced, and narrated numerous automotive and motorsports home videos in national distribution. In 2011, he researched, wrote, produced, and narrated the National Hot Rod Association's 60 Greatest Moments video to commemorate the NHRA's 60th anniversary. In 2014, he traveled to France, Monaco, and the French Riviera to write, produce, edit, and narrate the award-winning documentary "Henri Chemin and the Lost Hemi". In 2016, Stephens was chosen to provide his automotive expertise as an interview subject in the production of the docu-drama series "The Cars That Made America" on the History Channel.

Stephens served as a national event announcer for the NHRA Championship Drag Racing Series for 4 years between 1994 and 1997 and is a frequent Master of Ceremonies for various automotive and racing tributes, banquets, and award presentations. In 2010, he was the Master of Ceremonies for the "Tribute to Snake & Mongoose" at the Petersen Automotive Museum in Hollywood, California, highlighting the legendary careers of former drag racing stars Don "The Snake" Prudhomme and Tom "The Mongoose" McEwen. In 2011, he MC'ed the "Tribute to Phil Hill" at the Petersen Automotive Museum at which the great American World Champion was remembered by such iconic racing personalities as Dan Gurney, Carroll Shelby, Parnelli Jones, Jim Hall, Sam Posey, Denise McCluggage, and automotive enthusiast/TV host Jay Leno.

In 2013, he was chosen to host the West Coast unveiling of the 2014 C7 Chevrolet Corvette at the Petersen Automotive Museum which was attended by over 100 automotive journalists and motorsports personalities. His hosting duties at the Petersen Automotive Museum were also acquired for the "Tribute to George Follmer" in 2016, honoring the 1970 SCCA Trans Am World Champion with co-driver Parnelli Jones.

Stephens is a six-time winner of the national Telly Award for Television Production and has won the Imperial Palace Moto Award for Excellence in Historical Automotive Television.

=== Vehicle Appraisals ===
Based on his extensive experience as an on-air commentator for the Mecum Collector Car Auctions, in which he views and/or evaluates approximately 40,000 vehicles per year, Stephens offers comprehensive and detailed appraisals on classic, investment-grade automobiles through his subsidiary, Ultimate Garage Appraisals. Working with his substantial database covering automobiles and light-duty trucks from the 1940s to the present, Stephens provides appraisals for his clients reflecting real world value estimates in the constantly fluctuating marketplace.

=== Publishing ===
Stephens has written three books for Sports Publishing, LLC of Champaign, IL. In 2002, he collaborated with legendary drag racer "Big Daddy" Don Garlits on his memoirs titled "Big Daddy's Tales from the Drag Strip". In 2003, he co-wrote a similar book with 3-time NHRA Top Fuel champion Shirley Muldowney titled "Shirley Muldowney's Tales from the Track". Also in 2003, he authored a biographical picture book on the life of drag racer Kenny Bernstein titled "Kenny Bernstein, The King of Speed". Stephens is a frequent writer of motorsports features and automotive content for such publications as AutoWeek, ESPN The Magazine, ESPN.com, Drag Racer Magazine, and Drag Racing Action. He has also served as Senior Producer for WheelsTV in Acton, MA, producing video features of new and pre-owned automobile evaluations and analysis for various automotive Internet sites such as Vehix.com, J.D. Power & Associates, Auto Trader.com, MSNBC.com, and eBay Motors.

=== Corporate Communications Trainer ===
In 1986, Stephens created a unique speaking skills program, Vocal Point, and has conducted comprehensive training seminars for such companies as General Motors, Sears, Citibank, ADP Payroll Systems, Unifirst Corporation, Cablevision of Boston, Cablevision of New York, Prime Computer, Bull Information Systems, Yankee Software Systems, Cognos Direct, American Frozen Foods, Bell South, AT&T (formerly Cellular One and Cingular), Newpro Replacement Windows, and Epsilon.

Personal Life

Stephens has been married twice. His first marriage was to Joyce Anne Carberry in Boston, MA in February 1973, soon divorcing in the fall of 1974. He remarried in 1987 to Deborah Susan Donnell in Yarmouthport, MA, resulting in two sons, Will (born April 9, 1990) and Sean (born September 21, 1995) and divorced in May 2010.

He is an avid car collector and owns or has owned numerous collector-grade vehicles including a 1996 Dodge Viper GTS, 2007 Jeep Grand Cherokee SRT8, 2012 Jeep Grand Cherokee SRT8, 1965 Shelby American Continuation Series 427SC Cobra, a 1965 ERA 427 Cobra Replica, a 1993 GMC Typhoon, a 1998 Jaguar XK8 convertible, a 2001 Jaguar XK8, 1998 Jeep Grand Cherokee 5.9, a 1994 Mitsubishi 3000GT and 12 Chevrolet Corvettes in model years ranging from 1960 to 1980. He is also a jazz percussionist and briefly enrolled in private instructions at the Berklee School of Music in Boston in 1969.

=== Awards ===
Nominated for a 1998 Sports Emmy as part of the CBS Sports team covering the 1998 Daytona 500

Nominated for a 1992 Cable/ACE Award for the series "Wild About Wheels" carried on The Discovery Channel

Winner of 6 Telly Awards for Television Production, Writing, and/or Narration

Winner of the 1996 Imperial Palace Award for Historical Automotive Television

Winner of the 1994 National Silver Microphone Award for Radio Production

Winner of 3 International Radio Festival of New York Awards 1988, 1989, 1990

Winner of the 1990 Achievement in Radio Award for Commercial Production

2. ^Garlits, Don; Stephens, Bill (2003-4-1) "Tales from the Dragstrip" Sports Publishing LLC

3. ^Bernstein, Kenny; Stephens, Bill (2003-5-4) "King of Speed" Sports Publishing Inc.

- https://mecum.com
- https://radio.tcapsule.com
