= Ralph Sheheen =

American racing driver and broadcaster

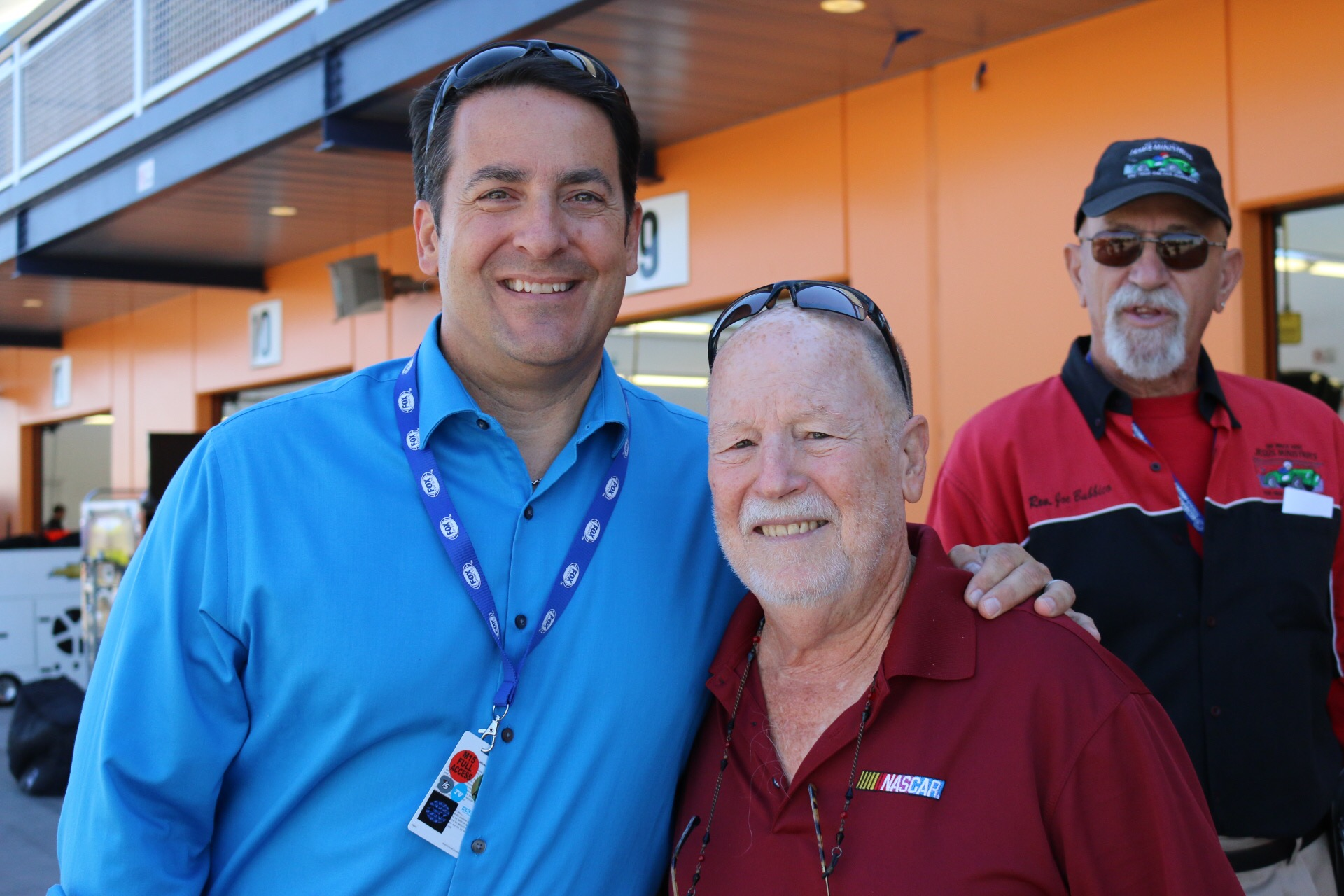
Sheheen with Owen Kearns at Las Vegas Motor Speedway in 2015

Ralph Sheheen (born August 23, 1964) is an American sports announcer. He was one of the lead broadcasters of NASCAR Xfinity Series on NBCSN, and was the lead commentator of Feld Entertainment's AMA Supercross Championship from 2006 until 2020. He also is the co-owner of the Speed Sport franchise through his stake in Turn 3 Media, LLC, which publishes the aforementioned magazine, the Web site, and both radio and television shows.

Sheheen was born in Utica, New York. Sheheen's work at Speed Channel included anchoring SpeedNews, and being the lap-by-lap announcer for the World of Outlaws' Knoxville Nationals. His broadcasting career began in 1988, when he did an IMSA sports car race for ESPN. Sheheen's career has grown since. He has worked for ESPN2, FSN, TNN (now Paramount Network), and CBS. While at TNN, his first job in 1992 was as a pit reporter for their coverage of the ASA. He eventually moved up to the lead lap-by-lap announcer for TNN's ASA coverage around 1995. He became the lead announcer of TNN's coverage of the NHRA Drag Racing Series and shared hosting duties with Steve Evans on TNN's coverage of the World of Outlaws. He also occasionally anchored their now-defunct racing news show, NASCAR RaceDay, and at CBS, he was a pit reporter for their coverage of Winston Cup Series races, most notably the Daytona 500. In 2005, Sheheen did lap-by-lap for Dorna-produced CBS's broadcasts of the San Marino Grand Prix, the Spanish Grand Prix, the Canadian Grand Prix, and the German Grand Prix.

Until 2005, Sheheen was the host/narrator of Speed's coverage of the World Rally Championship, and of the network's magazine show, WRC Rally Magazine. Sheheen has since been replaced. Speed's on-site WRC reporter, former co-champion Nicky Grist, has seen an increase in his role.

Since 2007, Sheheen has been a pit reporter for Speed-produced NASCAR on TNT. At the 2009 New Hampshire race, he filled in for Bill Weber as the lead announcer. On July 1, 2009, it was announced by TNT and NASCAR that Sheheen will fill in for Weber at the Coke Zero 400 and the LifeLock.com 400, the final two races of TNT's 2009 schedule.

From 2007 to 2008, Sheheen has also been the announcer for AMA Motocross Championship on the SPEED Channel, until he was replaced with the current announcer Jason Weigandt beginning in the 2009 Season.

Sheheen has also announced at the Grand Prix of Long Beach, covering the races held throughout the weekend.

One of Sheheen's early positions was as a trackside race announcer at northern California's American Federation of Motorcyclists (AFM) road course races at Sonoma Raceway in the early 1980s.

For his contributions to covering sprint car races, Sheheen was inducted into the National Sprint Car Hall of Fame in 2023.
