= Mike Joy =

American sports announcer

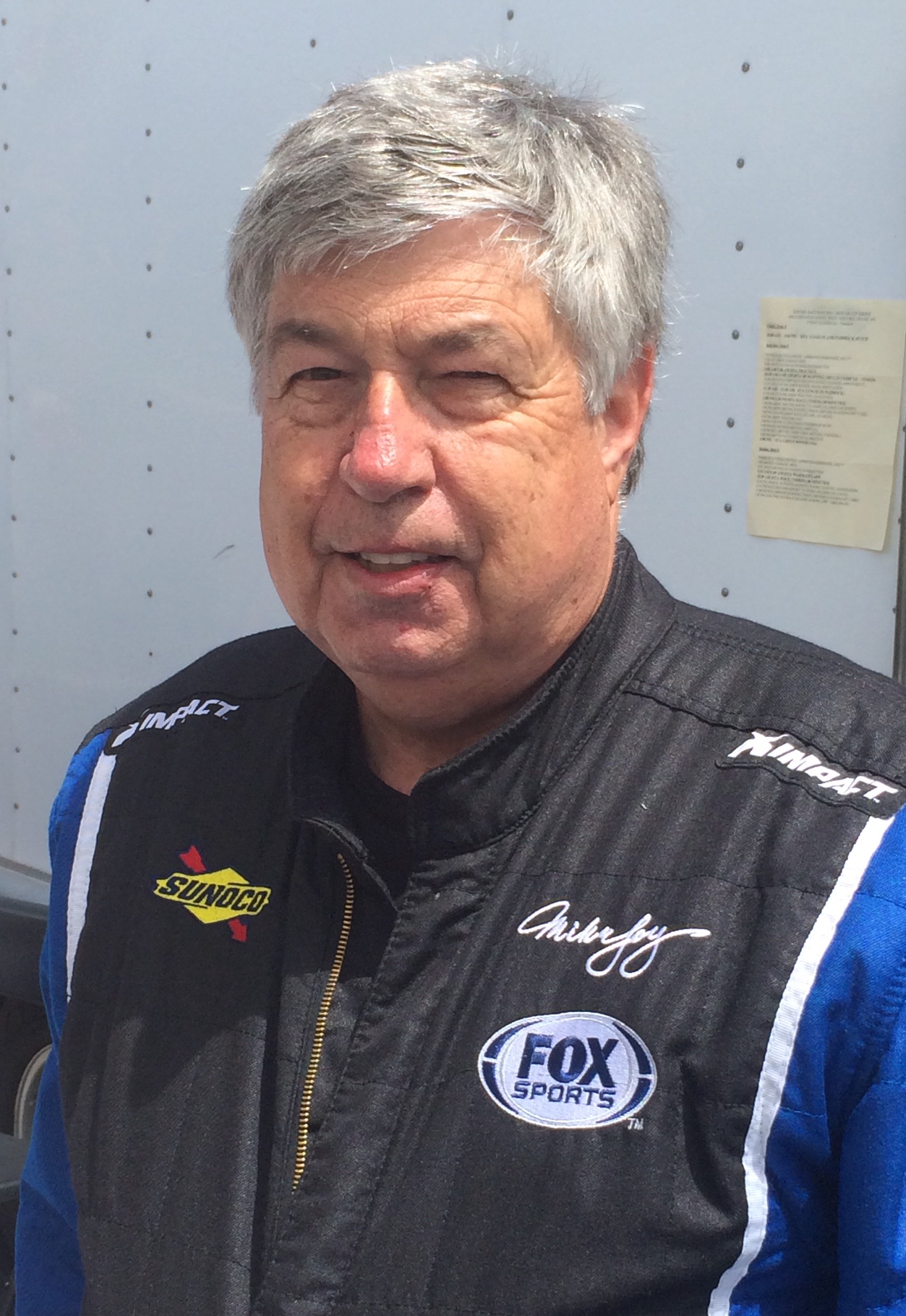
- Joy at Sonoma Raceway in 2021
- Born: Michael Kinsey Joy; Chicago, Illinois, U.S.
- Occupation: TV sports announcer
- Years active: 1970–present
- Known for: Commentator on Fox Sports for NASCAR events and Barrett-Jackson collector car auctions
- Spouse: Gaye Joy
- Children: 2
- Sports commentary career
- Genre: Play-by-play
- Sport: NASCAR
- Employer: CBS (1983–2000); TNN (1991–2000); FOX (1998–present)

Michael Kinsey Joy is an American TV sports announcer and businessman who serves as the play-by-play commentator for Fox Sports' NASCAR coverage. His color analysts are Clint Bowyer and Kevin Harvick. Joy has been part of the live broadcast team for 46 Daytona 500s (7 for the Motor Racing Network, 17 for CBS and 22 for FOX). He also serves as expert analyst for A&E Networks History Channel and FYI live TV coverage of collector car auctions.

== Early life and career ==
Michael Kinsey Joy was born in Chicago, Illinois to M. Verne Joy and Jean Peters Joy, the oldest of their four children. He was raised in Windsor, Connecticut, and graduated from West Hartford, Connecticut's Conard High School. His career began as a public address announcer at Riverside Park Speedway in Agawam, Massachusetts in 1970 while attending the University of Hartford and later Emerson College. He added Thompson Speedway Motorsports Park in 1972 and in 1975 began working at Stafford Motor Speedway in Connecticut, joining Jack Arute Jr., the son of the track owner, establishing the track as a hotbed for announcers. Announcing five nights per week, he was noticed by Motor Racing Network (MRN) co-founder Ken Squier. MRN hired him as a freelancer in 1975, then full-time in late 1978, working weekdays in marketing for Daytona International Speedway. He rose to co-anchor, general manager and executive producer of MRN in January 1980. In 1981, he was the lead broadcaster for ESPN's first live NASCAR telecast in that November's Atlanta Journal 500 at Atlanta.

=== Career ===
In June 1983, Joy became a pit reporter for CBS' coverage, working with Ken Squier and Ned Jarrett. Since CBS didn't broadcast many races, he also continued to broadcast for MRN radio. Joy also launched The Nashville Network's NASCAR coverage in 1991, as lap-by-lap announcer, continuing through 1995, and also participated in live NASCAR coverage on TBS.

In 1998, after 15 years on pit road, CBS Sports made Joy their lap-by-lap announcer with Ken Squier becoming the studio host, where the pair worked until the end of 2000, when CBS lost the rights to televise NASCAR racing.

Joy joined Fox Sports in 1998 to become the lead announcer of Formula One coverage on Fox Sports Net, with Derek Bell as expert analyst. For the 2001 season, he moved full-time to Fox with the NASCAR TV package. Joy teamed with Hall of Fame driver Darrell Waltrip and former crew chief Larry McReynolds to form the network's broadcast team.

Joy, Waltrip, and McReynolds completed 15 years together in 2015. Four-time NASCAR champion Jeff Gordon joined Joy and Waltrip in the FOX-TV booth beginning 2016, with McReynolds moving to a new role as race strategist and rules analyst. Waltrip retired after 2019. FOX added NASCAR Cup driver Clint Bowyer to the booth in 2021. At season's end, Gordon returned to Hendrick Motorsports full-time as vice-chairman. For 2022 and 2023, Joy and Bowyer were joined by a different guest analyst each week, including Tony Stewart, Richard Petty, and Dale Earnhardt Jr. In 2024, Kevin Harvick joined the two in booth for full-time broadcasting duties.

In 2001, 2003, 2005, and then 2007 through 2024, Fox broadcast the Daytona 500 and the next 15 NASCAR Cup races each season, plus two all-star events. Joy also anchors NASCAR Cup coverage on Fox-owned cable network Fox Sports 1 (FS1), formerly Speed.

In September 2008, Fox sent Joy to call a Minnesota Twins/Tampa Bay Rays Major League Baseball game, in which the Rays clinched their first-ever playoff appearance.

== Honors ==
Joy is a charter member of the NASCAR Hall of Fame Voting Panel, and in December 2013, was named sole media representative to the Hall's exclusive nominating process.

In 2000, Joy was inducted into the Riverside Park Speedway Hall of Fame.

In March 2014, a Sporting News poll named Joy first among network television's 15 NASCAR announcers and analysts with a 93% approval rating.

Joy was voted the 2011 recipient of the Henry T. McLemore Award, (now the "American Motorsports Media Award of Excellence"). Presented since 1969, this award celebrates career excellence in motorsports journalism and is voted on solely by past winners. The Motorsports Hall of Fame at Daytona International Speedway displays a wall of plaques honoring the winners, with smaller displays in several track media centers.

In 2019, Joy was named to the voting panel for the Indianapolis Motor Speedway Hall of Fame, and on November 10 of that year, he was inducted in the New England Auto Racers Hall of Fame. He is a member, and past vice-president, of the National Motorsports Press Association. In January 2023, Joy was inducted in the Eastern Motorsports Press Association Hall of Fame.

In 2024, Joy was nominated in the media/at-large category to the Motorsports Hall of Fame of America at Daytona International Speedway.

August 2025: The New York Times named Joy one of "The 25 Most Impactful Sports TV Play-by-play Voices of the 21st Century".

== Personal life ==
Joy resides near Winston-Salem, North Carolina with his wife Gaye. They have an adult son Scott, and daughter Kaitlyn.

Joy served four elected two-year terms on the Windsor, Conn. Town Council, where his committee was responsible for public health and safety for 25,000 residents.

== Notable calls ==
- February 15, 1998 – Joy was the lap-by-lap announcer for CBS Sports' coverage of the Daytona 500, where he called Dale Earnhardt's win after his 20th attempt to win the Great American Race.
- March 11, 2001 – Joy was the lap-by-lap announcer for Fox's coverage of the 2001 Cracker Barrel Old Country Store 500, where Kevin Harvick, who was the replacement driver for the late Dale Earnhardt, won his first career race in just his 3rd start beating Jeff Gordon by .006 seconds in one of the closest finishes in NASCAR history.
- March 16, 2003 – Joy was the lap-by-lap announcer for Fox's coverage of the 2003 Carolina Dodge Dealers 400, where Ricky Craven edged out Kurt Busch in the 2nd closest finish in NASCAR history at 0.002 seconds.
- February 18, 2007 – Joy was the lap-by-lap announcer for Fox's coverage of the 2007 Daytona 500, where Kevin Harvick made a last lap pass on Mark Martin to win by 0.02 seconds in a photo finish.
- September 20, 2008 – Joy was the play-by-play announcer for Fox Sports's coverage of the game between the Minnesota Twins and the Tampa Bay Rays, where the Rays clinched the team's first playoff berth in franchise history.
- June 26, 2016 – Joy was the lap-by-lap announcer for Fox's coverage of the 2016 Toyota/Save Mart 350, where Tony Stewart won his final career race in a tight last lap against Denny Hamlin.
