= Dick Berggren =

American racing announcer, writer and former driver

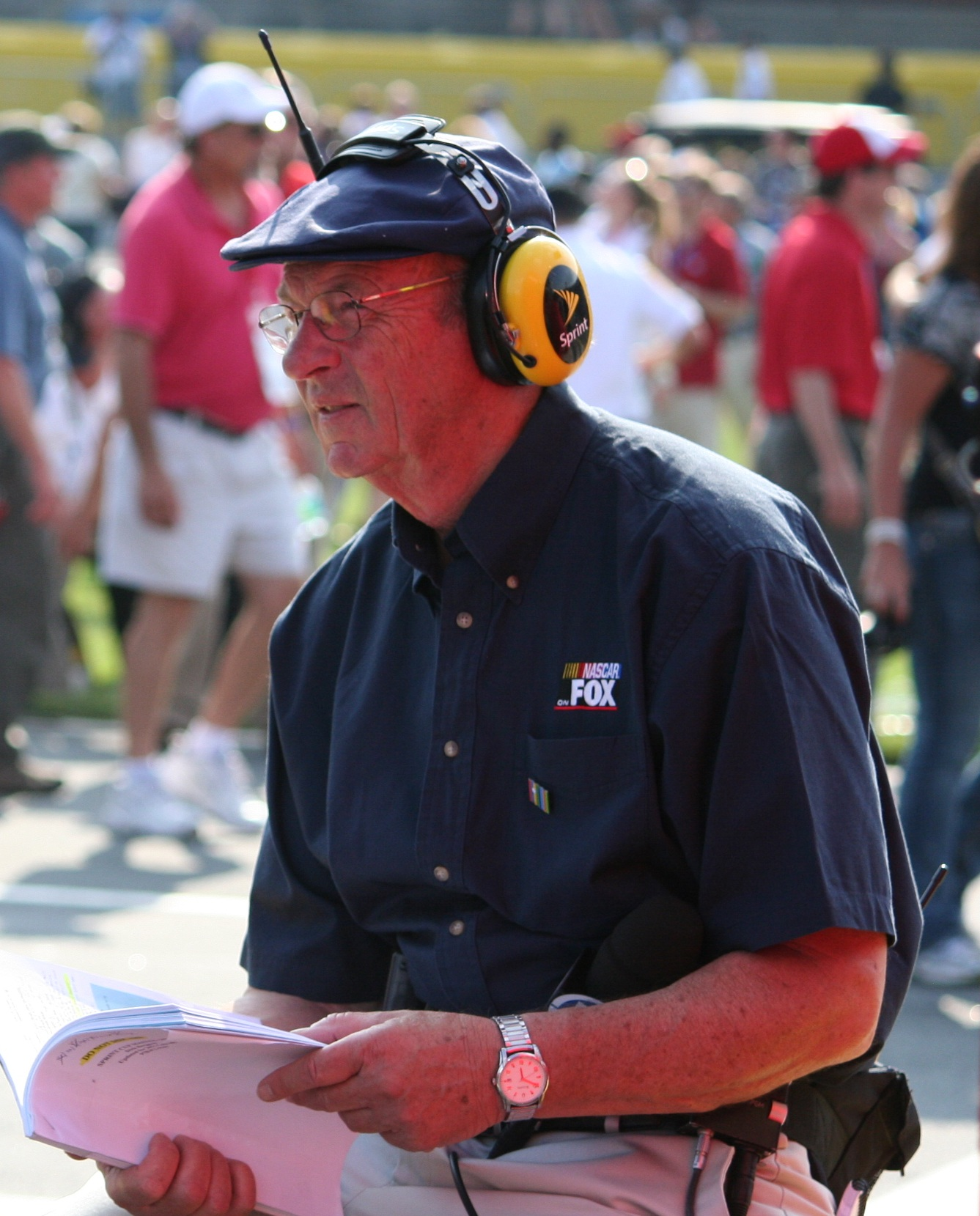
- Berggren at Charlotte Motor Speedway in 2011
- Born: May 27, 1942 (age 84); Westerly, Rhode Island, U.S.
- Occupations: Motorsports announcer and magazine editor

Richard Berggren (born May 27, 1942) is an American motorsports announcer and magazine editor from Manchester, Connecticut. He is commonly seen wearing a trademark flat cap.

== Academia ==
Berggren described himself as "the worst student" in high school. No college accepted him, so he accepted a job as an office boy at United Aircraft. He later was accepted at Quinnipiac College. Berggren transferred to Southern Connecticut State University, where his girlfriend Kathy was a student. He graduated with a bachelor's degree in 1965. Berggren earned a doctorate in psychology from Tufts University in 1970. His dissertation focused on sleep deprivation. He was a psychology professor at Emmanuel College in Boston for nine years.

One day, the only vehicle available in his driveway was his truck, which was still attached to his race trailer. He drove the truck to the college and parked it in the faculty parking lot. The racecar was covered in mud, but his name and sponsor decals were visible. Berggren was called to the university president's office and told to remove it immediately. "I knew right then and there that my academic career and my racing didn't go together anymore," says Berggren. "At the time, my racing was going incredibly well and I needed to do it while I was still young. I felt I could always go back to academia."

== Driving career ==
Berggren began racing in 1967 and won 26 events before his driving career ended in 1981. He raced SuperModifieds, Modifieds, stock cars, and sprint cars. He stopped racing after his racecar climbed a dirt bank at Boone Speedway, causing over 200 people to scatter to avoid being hit. "The very thought that I had written so many stories about racing safety, and had the chance to literally kill or maim a lot of people, I think 'til the day I die when I tell that story, it'll be emotional. It was one of the most important moments of my life. I'm just forever thankful that nobody got hurt."

== Editing ==
Berggren wrote for local newspapers early in his career. He worked for Stock Car Racing magazine while he taught at Emmanuel College and raced on the weekends. He later became the magazine's editor. After 22 years with the magazine, he left in 1999 to start Speedway Illustrated in partnership with the owners of Down East, The Magazine of Maine. The National Motorsport Press Association named Berggren the 1999 Writer of the Year. Both magazines cater to short track motor racing fans.

== Announcing ==
Berggren began his announcing career at Arundel Speedway in Maine. He has announced in many genres of motorsports over the course of his career. He announced the 1979 Daytona 500 for the Motor Racing Network radio network. He began his television career at NASCAR races in 1981 as a pit road reporter for ESPN. He has announced for NASCAR races at CBS, TBS, and TNN. He worked the pits for the Busch Series and Craftsman Truck Series, as well as the World of Outlaws sprint cars. He also hosted the Speed Channel show NASCAR Performance.

Berggren was the lead pit reporter for NASCAR on Fox from 2001-2012. He covered events in NASCAR's Sprint Cup Series from Daytona to Dover. In May 2012, Berggren announced he would retire after Fox's broadcast of the 2012 FedEx 400 at Dover International Speedway. Afterward he commented, "After the Fox portion of the year ends, I've always traveled to local tracks where I still enjoy sitting in the stands with a hot dog in one hand and a beer in the other, watching the local heroes. I can’t get enough of local-level racing so I'll do more of that now."

However, Berggren did return to CBS (where he had previously worked until 2000) for a limited schedule of pit reporting ARCA telecasts during the 2014 season. Berggren ended up working the three races for which CBS held the broadcast rights.

=== Acting ===
Berggren appeared as himself in the movie Talladega Nights: The Ballad of Ricky Bobby.

== Awards ==
Berggren was inducted into the National Sprint Car Hall of Fame in 2002. He was inducted in the New England Auto Racers Hall of Fame in 2008. Berggren received the 2007 Bobby Isaac Memorial Award for his outstanding contributions to short track racing.

== Personal ==
Born in Westerly, Rhode Island, he now lives in Ipswich, Massachusetts, with his wife Kathy. Berggren's mother died in 1992.
