= 1978 Daytona 500 =

Auto race held at Daytona International Speedway in 1978

Race details
- Race 2 of 30 in the 1978 NASCAR Winston Cup Series
- 1978 Daytona 500 program cover
- Date: February 19, 1978
- Location: Daytona International Speedway; Daytona Beach, Florida, U.S.
- Course: Permanent racing facility 2.5 mi (4.023 km)
- Distance: 200 laps, 500 mi (804.672 km)
- Weather: Temperatures of 73.9 °F (23.3 °C); wind speeds of 9.9 miles per hour (15.9 km/h)
- Average speed: 159.73 miles per hour (257.06 km/h)
- Attendance: 140,000

Pole position
Driver	Cale Yarborough	Junior Johnson & Associates

Qualifying race winners
Duel 1 Winner	A. J. Foyt	A. J. Foyt Enterprises
Duel 2 Winner	Darrell Waltrip	DiGard Motorsports

Most laps led
Driver	Buddy Baker	M.C. Anderson Racing
- Laps: 76

Winner
No. 15	Bobby Allison	Bud Moore Engineering

Television in the United States
- Network: ABC's WWOS
- Announcers: Jim McKay and Jackie Stewart
- Nielsen ratings: 11.8/33 (20.9.1 million viewers)

The 1978 Daytona 500, the 20th running of the event, was the second race of the 1978 NASCAR Winston Cup season. It was held on February 19 at Daytona International Speedway in Daytona Beach, Florida. Defending winner Cale Yarborough won the pole and Bobby Allison won the race.

== Race report ==
The race began with Richard Petty, who brought a brand new Dodge Magnum to the race, leading early. Starting in sixth place, Petty quickly went out in front and led 32 out of the first 60 laps, all under green. The first 60 laps were run at an average speed of nearly 180 mph. But on the lap 61, Petty cut a left rear tire and spun out, collecting long-time rival David Pearson and Darrell Waltrip.

Track conditions were very "green" that day, due to heavy rains during the week, meaning there was little rubber on the track. Just after the restart on lap 70, Parsons blew a left rear tire and spun out. Behind him, 1972 race winner A. J. Foyt was caught up and flipped several times in the turn 1 infield. That left the race to three drivers, 1977 race winner and polesitter Cale Yarborough, Buddy Baker and Bobby Allison, who entered the race with a 67-race winless streak. Yarborough dropped out with engine problems. With 11 laps remaining, Baker, dueling with Allison, suffered an engine failure. Allison drove his Bud Moore Ford Thunderbird around Baker to take the lead and capture his first Daytona 500 win.

It was the lowest starting position (33rd) that a driver had won the event, until 2007 when Kevin Harvick started one spot further back than Allison. 1978 would be final year for the AMC Matador with Jocko Maggiacomo's entry. First Daytona 500 starts for Bill Elliott, Blackie Wangerin, Morgan Shepherd, and Harry Gant. Only Daytona 500 starts for Roger Hamby, Roland Wlodyka, Jerry Jolly, Claude Ballot-Léna, and Al Holbert. Last Daytona 500 starts for Ron Hutcherson, Ferrel Harris, Skip Manning, Dick May, Jimmy Lee Capps, and Joe Mihalic.

Denver racer Jerry Jolly made his NASCAR Winston Cup debut and finished 20th, his best in the series. This would be the only one of his five Winston Cup starts where he was running at the finish. This was done in spite of a cut tire on the 92nd lap that started a four-car incident that also involved the cars of Cecil Gordon, Jimmy Lee Capps, and Tighe Scott. All four were running at the finish of a race that had a remarkably low amount of attrition for a race of that era. Only 14 of the 41 cars that started failed to make it to the finish, with a high percentage of those who failed to make it to the finish being some of the sport's top drivers.

This was the last Daytona 500 until the 2019 Daytona 500 without an Earnhardt in the field.

Notable crew chiefs who participated in this race included Darrell Bryant, Junie Donlavey, Jake Elder, Joey Arrington, Herb Nab, Dale Inman, Bud Moore and Harry Hyde.

== Race results ==
Pos	Grid	No.	Driver	Entrant	Manufacturer	Laps	Winnings	Laps led	Time/Status	Points
1	33	15	Bobby Allison	Bud Moore Engineering	Ford	200	$56,300	28	3:07:49	180
2	1	11	Cale Yarborough	Junior Johnson & Associates	Oldsmobile	200	$41,900	43	+33.2	175
3	8	72	Benny Parsons	L. G. DeWitt	Oldsmobile	199	$31,865	2	+1 Lap	170
4	2	53	Ron Hutcherson	A. J. Foyt Enterprises	Buick	199	$22,250	0	+1 Lap	160
5	32	90	Dick Brooks	Donlavey Racing	Mercury	198	$19,925	0	+2 Laps	155
6	10	2	Dave Marcis	Rod Osterlund	Chevrolet	198	$15,600	0	+2 Laps	150
7	31	27	Buddy Baker	M. C. Anderson	Oldsmobile	196	$16,395	76	Engine	156
8	9	9	Bill Elliott	Elliott Racing	Mercury	195	$12,085	0	+5 Laps	142
9	23	6	Ferrel Harris	Jim Stacy	Dodge	195	$11,175	0	+5 Laps	138
10	28	54	Lennie Pond	Ranier Racing	Oldsmobile	195	$10,285	0	+5 Laps	134
11	11	30	Tighe Scott	Walter Ballard	Oldsmobile	194	$10,605	0	+6 Laps	130
12	18	92	Skip Manning	Billy Hagan	Buick	194	$9,560	0	+6 Laps	127
13	19	3	Richard Childress	Richard Childress Racing	Oldsmobile	194	$8,665	0	+6 Laps	124
14	13	41	Grant Adcox	Herb Adcox	Chevrolet	193	$6,370	0	+7 Laps	121
15	30	17	Roger Hamby	Hamby Motorsports	Chevrolet	193	$6,185	0	+7 Laps	118
16	17	67	Buddy Arrington	Buddy Arrington	Dodge	192	$6,845	0	+8 Laps	115
17	40	40	D. K. Ulrich	D. K. Ulrich	Chevrolet	192	$6,150	0	+8 Laps	112
18	25	57	Dick May	Alfred McClure	Ford	192	$4,410	0	+8 Laps	109
19	15	98	Roland Wlodyka	Rod Osterlund	Buick	192	$4,150	0	+8 Laps	106
20	26	28	Jerry Jolly	Charles Dean	Chevrolet	191	$3,720	0	+9 Laps	103
21	41	24	Cecil Gordon	Gordon Racing	Chevrolet	191	$4,110	0	+9 Laps	100
22	35	49	Claude Ballot-Léna	G. C. Spencer	Dodge	190	$2,835	0	+10 Laps	–
23	27	26	Jimmy Lee Capps	David Lee Sellers	Chevrolet	189	$2,805	0	+11 Laps	94
24	34	79	Frank Warren	Frank Warren	Dodge	188	$3,125	0	+12 Laps	91
25	38	64	Tommy Gale	Elmo Langley	Ford	185	$3,350	0	+15 Laps	88
26	16	14	Coo Coo Marlin	H. B. Cunningham	Chevrolet	179	$2,425	0	+21 Laps	85
27	12	5	Neil Bonnett	Jim Stacy	Dodge	150	$5,750	0	Engine	82
28	4	88	Darrell Waltrip	DiGard Racing	Chevrolet	138	$16,050	12	+62 Laps	84
29	14	48	Al Holbert	James Hylton	Chevrolet	136	$3,065	0	Engine	76
30	22	70	J. D. McDuffie	McDuffie Racing	Chevrolet	132	$2,880	0	+68 Laps	73
31	21	61	Joe Mihalic	Jim Norris	Oldsmobile	110	$2,200	0	Engine	70
32	3	51	A. J. Foyt	A. J. Foyt Enterprises	Buick	68	$12,675	0	Crash	–
33	6	43	Richard Petty	Petty Enterprises	Dodge	60	$11,600	39	Crash	69
34	5	21	David Pearson	Wood Brothers Racing	Mercury	60	$6,775	0	Crash	61
35	39	52	Jimmy Means	Jimmy Means Racing	Chevrolet	41	$2,395	0	Engine	58
36	29	39	Blackie Wangerin	Blackie Wangerin	Mercury	30	$1,950	0	Engine	55
37	36	22	Ricky Rudd	Al Rudd	Chevrolet	21	$4,375	0	Handling	52
38	24	89	Jim Vandiver	O. L. Nixon	Chevrolet	19	$1,975	0	Engine	49
39	7	1	Donnie Allison	Hoss Ellington	Oldsmobile	9	$4,325	0	Body dam	46
40	37	84	Morgan Shepherd	Jim Makar	Mercury	8	$1,650	0	Engine	43
41	20	66	Harry Gant	Ray Emerson	Buick	1	$1,975	0	Engine	40

== Media ==
=== Television ===
The Daytona 500 was covered by ABC for the seventeenth and final time. ABC aired reports during the early stages of the race and then live coverage started at 3:00pm and was two thirds into the race and continued into the end of the race. Jim McKay and three time Formula One World Champion Jackie Stewart called the race from the broadcast booth. Chris Economaki handled pit road for the television side.

ABC
Booth announcers		Pit reporters
Lap-by-lap	Color-commentators	Pit reporters
Jim McKay	Jackie Stewart	Chris Economaki
