= Grant Adcox =

American racecar driver (1950–1989)

- Adcox in a 1974 postcard
- Born: January 2, 1950; Chattanooga, Tennessee, U.S.
- Died: November 19, 1989 (aged 39); Hampton, Georgia, U.S.
- Cause of death: Racing accident
- Height: 5 ft 9 in (1.75 m)
- Weight: 170 lb (77 kg)
- Awards: 1987, 1988 ARCA Racing Series Bill France Four Crown

NASCAR Cup Series career
- 60 races run over 11 years
- Best finish: 29th (1978)
- First race: 1974 Carolina 500 (Rockingham)
- Last race: 1989 Atlanta Journal 500 (Atlanta)
Wins	Top tens	Poles
0	6	0

NASCAR O'Reilly Auto Parts Series career
- 1 race run over 1 year
- Best finish: 80th (1989)
- First race: 1989 AC-Delco 200 (Rockingham)
- Last race: 1989 AC-Delco 200 (Rockingham)
Wins	Top tens	Poles
0	0	0
- Statistics up to date as of December 18, 2012.

Herbert Grant Adcox (January 2, 1950 – November 19, 1989) was an American stock car driver who died in a single-car accident in the 1989 Atlanta Journal 500 in the NASCAR Winston Cup Series.

== Career ==
Adcox's Winston Cup Series career started in 1974, running a handful of races for his father Herb Adcox with sponsorship backing from the family's Chevrolet dealership in Chattanooga, Tennessee.

In that year's Winston 500 – considered one of the top events in the sport – held at the fastest track on the circuit, the Talladega Superspeedway, Adcox and his father qualified for the event. With a hundred laps in the books, a caution period came out as Donnie Allison's clutch burned out and David Sisco's motor blew up. Gary Bettenhausen, who had pitted a lap after the leaders, was up on jacks as Adcox came down for service. Adcox's car hit an oil and water patch and slammed straight into Bettenhausen's Matador, crushing catch-can man Don Miller between the cars. A young crew member of the Nord Krauskopf team who was nearby, Buddy Parrott, came rushing down to help, while Penske crew members John Woodward and John Watson were also injured. Miller was taken to a hospital and eventually had his right leg amputated. Learning of the extent of Miller's injuries, Adcox went into shock, and his car was withdrawn from the event.

Adcox continued to run sporadic Winston Cup races over the years. He qualified for the 1975 Talladega 500, but his crew chief Gene Lovell suffered a heart attack and died in their garage. Adcox's car was withdrawn, but he was able to find a substitute ride. However, the race was delayed for a week due to rain, and Adcox was again forced to withdraw. His spot on the grid was given to Tiny Lund, who had not raced in Winston Cup for several years. Lund subsequently died during the race in an accident on lap seven.

The 1978 Winston 500 at Talladega was Adcox's best result, as Krystal Restaurants came on board for a partial season with sponsorship money and in his family-owned Chevrolet, Adcox finished fifth in his career best Winston Cup finish.

Adcox's racing career was consistently underfunded. A year later, he was again sponsorless; he timed in fourth for the 1979 Firecracker 400 at Daytona International Speedway, but his car's raw speed did not pay off, and his motor expired early. He continued to run sporadic events over the years, but never again contended.

Adcox's primary claim to fame was for being a strong competitor in ARCA competition, a lesser stockcar series that uses older Winston Cup cars and more grassroots-based operations. He was especially dominant on the superspeedways; he won a record four of them in 1986 and had eight total superspeedway triumphs in his career, with five victories coming at Talladega. Dale Earnhardt, in an interview before a 1989 race at North Carolina Motor Speedway, remarked about how well Adcox had done in ARCA and said that if he had the monetary backing that other teams had, he might become a success in NASCAR.

For 1989, Adcox had signed up with Bumper to Bumper All Pro Autoparts and in a family-owned Chevrolet planned to run in a handful of Winston Cup events.

== Death ==
In the season finale at Atlanta Motor Speedway, Adcox crashed heavily on lap 202 of the event and died of major chest and head injuries, also suffering a heart attack as result of the crash. Upon investigation, the severe impact was determined to have torn his improperly mounted racing seat away from its mount entirely, and this led to Adcox's death. It also led to new safety regulations on the way seats were mounted for the 1990 season.

ARCA's sportsmanship award, the H.G. Adcox Award, is named in Adcox's honor, and was awarded annually by his father Herb until his death in 2015. The Grant Adcox Memorial is also held annually in his honor at North Georgia Speedway and a subsequent event has been held also in Cleveland, Tennessee.

Adcox is interred at the Chattanooga Memorial Park in Chattanooga, TN.

== Motorsports career results ==
=== NASCAR ===
(key) (Bold – Pole position awarded by qualifying time. Italics – Pole position earned by points standings or practice time. * – Most laps led.)

==== Winston Cup Series ====
NASCAR Winston Cup Series results
Year	Team	No.	Make	1	2	3	4	5	6	7	8	9	10	11	12	13	14	15	16	17	18	19	20	21	22	23	24	25	26	27	28	29	30	31	NWCC	Pts	Ref
1974	Adcox Racing	41	Chevy	RSD	DAY; DNQ	RCH	CAR; 18	BRI	ATL; 25	DAR	NWS	MAR	TAL; 38	NSV	DOV	CLT	RSD	MCH	DAY	BRI	NSV	ATL	POC	TAL	MCH	DAR	RCH	DOV	NWS	MAR	CLT; 18	CAR	ONT		54th	16.6	
1975	Adcox Racing	41	Chevy	RSD	DAY; 37	RCH	CAR	BRI	ATL; 21	NWS	DAR	MAR	TAL; 7	NSV	DOV	CLT	RSD	MCH; 29	DAY; 36	NSV; 27	POC		MCH; 14	DAR; 13	DOV	NWS	MAR	CLT; 16	RCH	CAR	BRI; 25	ATL	ONT		33rd	1020	
1975	Tom Williams	38	Chevy																			TAL; 34													33rd	1020	
1976	Adcox Racing	41	Chevy	RSD	DAY; DNQ	CAR; 7	RCH	BRI	ATL; 12	NWS	DAR; 7	MAR	TAL; 19	NSV	DOV	CLT; 12	RSD	MCH	DAY; 30	NSV	POC	TAL; 18	MCH	BRI	DAR; 13	RCH	DOV	MAR	NWS	CLT; 14	CAR; 12	ATL; 20	ONT		31st	1163	
1977	Adcox Racing	41	Chevy	RSD	DAY; 34	RCH	CAR	ATL	NWS	DAR	BRI	MAR	TAL; 37	NSV	DOV	CLT	RSD	MCH	DAY; 26	NSV; 25	POC	TAL; 15	MCH	BRI	DAR	RCH	DOV	MAR	NWS	CLT	CAR	ATL; 22	ONT		50th	413	
1978	Adcox Racing	41	Chevy	RSD	DAY; 14	RCH	CAR; 30	ATL; 7	BRI	DAR; 25	NWS	MAR	TAL; 5	DOV	CLT; 11	NSV; 6	RSD	MCH; 22	DAY; 22	NSV; 11	POC	TAL; 22	MCH	BRI	DAR; 31	RCH	DOV	MAR	NWS	CLT; 33	CAR	ATL; 38	ONT		29th	1467	
1979	Adcox Racing	41	Chevy	RSD	DAY; 23	CAR	RCH	ATL; 28	NWS	BRI	DAR	MAR	TAL	NSV	DOV																				36th	560	
1979	Adcox Racing	41	Olds													CLT; 11	TWS	RSD	MCH	DAY; 33	NSV	POC	TAL; 19	MCH	BRI	DAR	RCH	DOV	MAR	CLT	NWS	CAR			36th	560	
1979	Adcox Racing	41	Buick																														ATL; 27	ONT	36th	560	
1983	Adcox Racing	29	Chevy	DAY	RCH	CAR	ATL	DAR	NWS	MAR	TAL	NSV	DOV	BRI	CLT	RSD	POC	MCH	DAY	NSV	POC	TAL; 36	MCH	BRI	DAR	RCH	DOV	MAR	NWS	CLT	CAR	ATL	RSD		95th	55	
1984	Adcox Racing	29	Chevy	DAY; QL^{†}	RCH	CAR	ATL	BRI	NWS	DAR	MAR	TAL	NSV	DOV	CLT	RSD	POC	MCH	DAY	NSV	POC	TAL; 40	MCH	BRI	DAR	RCH	DOV	MAR	CLT	NWS	CAR	ATL	RSD		91st	43	
1985	Adcox Racing	29	Chevy	DAY	RCH	CAR	ATL	BRI	DAR	NWS	MAR	TAL	DOV	CLT	RSD	POC	MCH	DAY; 22	POC	TAL; 40	MCH	BRI	DAR	RCH	DOV	MAR	NWS	CLT	CAR	ATL	RSD				71st	140	
1986	Adcox Racing	29	Chevy	DAY; DNQ	RCH	CAR	ATL	BRI	DAR	NWS	MAR	TAL	DOV	CLT	RSD	POC	MCH	DAY; 26	POC	TAL; DNQ	GLN	MCH	BRI	DAR	RCH	DOV	MAR	NWS	CLT	CAR	ATL; DNQ	RSD			101st	85	
1987	Adcox Racing	24	Chevy	DAY; DNQ	CAR	RCH	ATL	DAR	NWS	BRI	MAR	TAL	CLT	DOV	POC	RSD	MCH	DAY	POC	TAL	GLN	MCH	BRI	DAR	RCH	DOV	MAR	NWS	CLT	CAR	RSD	ATL			NA	-	
1989	Adcox Racing	22	Chevy	DAY	CAR	ATL	RCH	DAR	BRI	NWS	MAR	TAL; 24	CLT	DOV	SON	POC	MCH	DAY; 13	POC	TAL	GLN	MCH	BRI	DAR	RCH	DOV	MAR	CLT	NWS	CAR	PHO				51st	282	
1989	Adcox Racing	22	Olds																													ATL; 32			51st	282	
^{†} - Qualified but replaced by Connie Saylor

===== Daytona 500 =====
Year	Team	Manufacturer	Start	Finish
1974	Adcox Racing	Chevrolet	DNQ	
1975	Adcox Racing	Chevrolet	25	37
1976	Adcox Racing	Chevrolet	DNQ	
1977	Adcox Racing	Chevrolet	14	34
1978	Adcox Racing	Chevrolet	13	14
1979	Adcox Racing	Chevrolet	21	23
1984	Adcox Racing	Chevrolet	QL^{†}	
1986	Adcox Racing	Chevrolet	DNQ	
1987	Adcox Racing	Chevrolet	DNQ	
^{†} - Qualified but replaced by Connie Saylor

==== Busch Series ====
NASCAR Busch Series results
Year	Team	No.	Make	1	2	3	4	5	6	7	8	9	10	11	12	13	14	15	16	17	18	19	20	21	22	23	24	25	26	27	28	29	NBSC	Pts	Ref
1989	Adcox Racing	21	Olds	DAY	CAR	MAR	HCY	DAR	BRI	NZH	SBO	LAN	NSV	CLT	DOV	ROU	LVL	VOL	MYB	SBO	HCY	DUB	IRP	ROU	BRI	DAR	RCH	DOV	MAR	CLT	CAR; 18	MAR	80th	109	

=== ARCA Permatex SuperCar Series ===
(key) (Bold – Pole position awarded by qualifying time. Italics – Pole position earned by points standings or practice time. * – Most laps led.)

ARCA Permatex SuperCar Series results
Year	Team	No.	Make	1	2	3	4	5	6	7	8	9	10	11	12	13	14	15	16	17	18	19	APSC	Pts	Ref
1975	Adcox Racing	41	Chevy	SLM	DAY	SLM	TAL; 24	QCS	NSV	TOL	SLM	AVS	FMS	JEF	TOL	AND							NA	0	
1976	Adcox Racing	41	Chevy	SLM	DAY; 27	QCS	FMS	TAL; 21	QCS	AVS	SLM	FRS	TOL	NSV	TOL	SLM							NA	0	
1977	Adcox Racing	41	Chevy	TOL	DAY	QCS	BFS	NSV	FRS	TOL	SLM	AVS	TAL; 4	TOL	SND	SLM							NA	0	
1978	Adcox Racing	41	Chevy	DAY; 18	QCS	AVS	NSV	IMS	LOR	FRS	TAL; 13	FRS	CMS	JEF									NA	0	
1985	Adcox Racing	29	Chevy	ATL; 2	DAY	ATL	TAL; 10	ATL; 3	SSP	IRP	CSP	FRS	IRP	OEF	ISF	DSF	TOL						35th	-	
1986	Adcox Racing	2	Chevy	ATL; 5	DAY; 1	ATL; 26*	TAL; 1*	SIR	SSP	FRS	KIL	CSP	TAL; 1	BLN	ISF; 11	DSF	TOL; 5	MCS	ATL; 1				20th	-	
1987	Adcox Racing	2	Chevy	DAY; 9	ATL; 4	TAL; 1*	DEL; 2	ACS; 3	TOL; 13	ROC; 7	POC; 24	FRS; 23	KIL; 12		FRS; 4	ISF; 21	INF; 6	DSF; 20	SLM; 18				4th	3450	
1987	Adcox Racing	2	Olds											**TAL**; 1*						**ATL**; 20			4th	3450	
1988	Adcox Racing	2	Olds	**DAY**; 21		TAL; 2																	3rd	3980	
1988	Adcox Racing	2	Chevy		ATL; 1		FRS; 2	PCS; 6	ROC; 10	POC; 5	WIN; 3	KIL; 3	ACS; 4	SLM; 24	POC; 6	TAL; 1*	DEL; 15	FRS; 4	ISF; 36	DSF; 39	SLM; 14	ATL; 20	3rd	3980	
1989	Adcox Racing	2	Chevy	DAY; 34	ATL; 7	KIL	**TAL**; 27	FRS	POC	KIL	HAG	POC	TAL; 28	DEL; 24	FRS; 1*	ISF	TOL; 22	DSF	SLM				26th	-	
1989	Adcox Racing	2	Olds																	ATL; 27			26th	-	
Results before 1985 may be incomplete.

Preceded by Rick Baldwin	NASCAR Sprint Cup Series fatal accidents 1989	Succeeded by J. D. McDuffie
