= List of Daytona 500 broadcasters =

Green flag at the 2015 Daytona 500, aired live on Fox.

The following is a list of the American television networks and announcers who have broadcast NASCAR's annual Daytona 500 throughout the years. Throughout its history, the Daytona 500 has been aired on all four major networks in the U.S., including ABC, CBS, NBC, and Fox. In 1979, CBS covered the race live flag-to-flag for the first time. The unprecedented broadcast was considered risky by network executives, but was a rousing success when a snowstorm blanketed much of the east coast, prompting a huge viewing audience. An exciting and shocking finish capped off a telecast that was considered a ground-breaking moment in the history of NASCAR, and one of the defining moments that helped elevate the sport into the mainstream.

Currently, Fox holds exclusive rights to carry the Daytona 500 in the United States, under the terms of contract extensions that run through the 2024 NASCAR season. As part of the package, Fox also holds the exclusive rights to support events held during Daytona 500 Speedweeks, including the Clash, Daytona 500 pole qualifying, the Duels, the Truck Series race, the Xfinity Series race, and the respective practice sessions. Some of the ancillary events are aired on Fox companion channels FS1 and FS2.

== Early CBS and ABC's Wide World of Sports era (1959–1978) ==
The first known telecast of a NASCAR race was the 1960 Daytona 500, parts of which was presented as part of CBS Sports Spectacular, with announcer Bud Palmer.

From 1962 to 1978, the Daytona 500 was shown on ABC's Wide World of Sports. During the 1960s and early 1970s, the race was filmed and an edited highlight package aired the following weekend. In 1974, ABC began the first semi-live coverage (joined-in-progress) of the Daytona 500. Coverage was normally timed to begin when the race was halfway over. Brief taped highlights of the start and early segments were shown, then ABC joined the race live already in progress, picking up approximately the last 90 minutes of the race. This format continued through 1978.

The 1976 race was held on the same day of the final day of competition in the Winter Olympics (also broadcast on ABC). ABC carried 30 minutes of live coverage of the start of the race, then switched to the Olympics for 90 minutes to carry taped coverage of the final two competitive events (a cross-country ski race and the final runs in the bobsled), held earlier that day. Then it was back to Daytona for about an hour-and-a-half for the finish.

During the period on Wide World of Sports, the booth announcers typically served as roving pit reporters during the running of the race, as well as interviewing in victory lane. The booth commentary was recorded in post-production.

Year	Network	Lap-by-lap	Color commentator(s)	Pit reporters	Host	Ratings	Viewers
1959	none	—	—	—	—	—	—
1960	CBS	Bud Palmer		Bud Palmer	Bud Palmer		
1961	none	—	—	—	—	—	—
1962	ABC	Jim McKay	Stirling Moss	Chris Economaki	Jim McKay		
1963	ABC	Bill Flemming	Chris Economaki	Chris Economaki	Bill Flemming		
1964	ABC	Bill Flemming	Chris Economaki; Stirling Moss	Chris Economaki; Stirling Moss	Bill Flemming		
1965	ABC	Bill Flemming	Dan Gurney	Bill Flemming	Bill Flemming		
1966	ABC	Curt Gowdy	Rodger Ward	Chris Economaki	Curt Gowdy		
1967	ABC	Jim McKay	Chris Economaki	Chris Economaki	Jim McKay		
1968	ABC	Bill Flemming	Chris Economaki	Bill Flemming	Bill Flemming		
1969	ABC	Bill Flemming	Chris Economaki	Bill Flemming	Bill Flemming		
1970	ABC	Keith Jackson	Chris Economaki	Chris Economaki	Keith Jackson		
1971	ABC	Keith Jackson	Chris Economaki	Chris Economaki	Keith Jackson		
1972	ABC	Keith Jackson	Chris Economaki	Chris Economaki	Keith Jackson		
1973	ABC	Jim McKay	Jackie Stewart	Chris Economaki	Jim McKay		
1974	ABC	Keith Jackson	Jackie Stewart	Chris Economaki	Keith Jackson	10.9/29	12.5 million
1975	ABC	Bill Flemming	Jackie Stewart	Bill Flemming	Bill Flemming	11.8/31	15.1 million
1976	ABC	Bill Flemming	Jackie Stewart	Chris Economaki	Bill Flemming	12.8/37	18.3 million
1977	ABC	Jim McKay	Jackie Stewart	Chris Economaki	Jim McKay	12.9/35	16.0 million
1978	ABC	Jim McKay	Jackie Stewart	Chris Economaki	Jim McKay	11.8/33	20.9 million

== CBS era (1979–2000) ==
In 1979, CBS instituted the live "flag-to-flag" coverage policy. The ground-breaking 1979 broadcast ushered in the 22-year run of NASCAR on CBS. The 1987 broadcast won the Sports Emmy for "Outstanding Live Sports Special." Ken Squier served as play-by-play announcer from 1979 to 1997. In 1998, former pit reporter Mike Joy was promoted to play-by-play, while Squier moved to the host position.

The 1995 race includes a two-hour rain delay that occurred near the midpoint. Some markets in the U.S. did not have the race, as CBS lost major market affiliates during the 1994-95 season.

During its entire run from 1979-2000, CBS also carried the Busch Clash (live), and in most years, carried the Twin 125s (tape-delayed). In the mid-1990s, CBS also picked up coverage of the Goody's 300 from 1997, while pole qualifying for the Daytona 500 was aired on ESPN during much of the 1990s before it switched to CBS in 1999.

Since 1996, U.S. television ratings for the Daytona 500 have been the highest for any auto race of the year, surpassing the traditional leader, the Indianapolis 500. The 2006 Daytona 500 attracted the sixth largest average live global TV audience of any sporting event that year with 20 million viewers.

Year	Network	Lap-by-lap	Color commentator(s)	Pit reporters	Host	Ratings	Viewers
1979	CBS	Ken Squier	David Hobbs	Ned Jarrett; Brock Yates	Ken Squier	10.5/29	15.1 million
1980	CBS	Ken Squier	David Hobbs	Ned Jarrett; Brock Yates	Ken Squier	8.0/21	10.8 million
1981	CBS	Ken Squier	David Hobbs	Ned Jarrett; Brock Yates	Ken Squier	8.4/26	11.2 million
1982	CBS	Ken Squier	David Hobbs	Ned Jarrett; Larry Nuber	Brock Yates	9.4/27	11.8 million
1983	CBS	Ken Squier	David Hobbs	Ned Jarrett; Larry Nuber	Ken Squier	8.7/26	11.0 million
1984	CBS	Ken Squier	David Hobbs	Ned Jarrett; Chris Economaki; Mike Joy	Chris Economaki	8.7/23	12.3 million
1985	CBS	Ken Squier	David Hobbs; Ned Jarrett	Chris Economaki; Mike Joy	Chris Economaki	8.3/23	9.8 million
1986	CBS	Ken Squier	David Hobbs; Ned Jarrett	Chris Economaki; Mike Joy	Chris Economaki	8.4/22	10.3 million
1987	CBS	Ken Squier	David Hobbs; Ned Jarrett	Chris Economaki; Mike Joy; Dave Despain	Chris Economaki	9.4/26	12.4 million
1988	CBS	Ken Squier	Ned Jarrett; Chris Economaki	Mike Joy; Dave Despain; David Hobbs	Chris Economaki	7.4/18	10.0 million
1989	CBS	Ken Squier	Ned Jarrett; Chris Economaki	Mike Joy; Dave Despain; David Hobbs	Chris Economaki	8.1/21	12.0 million
1990	CBS	Ken Squier	Ned Jarrett; Chris Economaki	Mike Joy; Dave Despain; David Hobbs	Chris Economaki	7.3/20	10.5 million
1991	CBS	Ken Squier	Ned Jarrett; David Hobbs	Mike Joy; Dave Despain; Chris Economaki	Chris Economaki	7.6/20	10.9 million
1992	CBS	Ken Squier	Ned Jarrett; Neil Bonnett	Mike Joy; David Hobbs; Chris Economaki	Chris Economaki	9.2/25	13.4 million
1993	CBS	Ken Squier	Ned Jarrett; Neil Bonnett	Mike Joy; David Hobbs; Chris Economaki	Chris Economaki	8.4/23	12.7 million
1994	CBS	Ken Squier	Ned Jarrett; Chris Economaki	Mike Joy; David Hobbs	Chris Economaki	9.6/26	13.6 million
1995	CBS	Ken Squier	Ned Jarrett; Richard Petty	Mike Joy; David Hobbs; Dick Berggren	Ken Squier	7.8/20	11.4 million
1996	CBS	Ken Squier	Ned Jarrett; Buddy Baker	Mike Joy; David Hobbs; Dick Berggren	Ken Squier	9.2/24	13.9 million
1997	CBS	Ken Squier	Ned Jarrett; Buddy Baker	Mike Joy; Dick Berggren; Ralph Sheheen	Ken Squier	8.6/23	12.8 million
1998	CBS	Mike Joy	Ned Jarrett; Buddy Baker	Dick Berggren; Ralph Sheheen; Bill Stephens	Ken Squier	8.6/23	13.0 million
1999	CBS	Mike Joy	Ned Jarrett; Buddy Baker	Dick Berggren; Ralph Sheheen; Bill Stephens	Greg Gumbel; Ken Squier	9.6/25	12.9 million
2000	CBS	Mike Joy	Ned Jarrett; Buddy Baker	Dick Berggren; Ralph Sheheen; Bill Stephens	Ken Squier	8.4/22	12.9 million

== Fox/NBC era (2001–2006) ==
From 2001 to 2006, the Daytona 500 broadcasting network alternated between Fox and NBC under the terms of a six-year, $2.48 billion, centralized NASCAR television contract. Previously, television rights deals for races were negotiated by the individual track owners. Beginning in 2001, the television contract would now be administered by the sanctioning body. Fox carried the Daytona 500 in odd-numbered years (2001, 2003, 2005), and NBC carried the Daytona 500 in even-numbered years (2002, 2004, 2006). The Pepsi 400 in July followed the opposite pattern, going to the network not airing the Daytona 500 in the respective season.

Rights to other support events held during Speedweeks followed the same general pattern, alternating between Fox/FX (odd years) and NBC/TNT (even years). Ancillary events included the Budweiser Shootout, Daytona 500 pole qualifying, the Gatorade 125s, as well as coverage of "Happy Hour" practice and other practice sessions. The Busch Series race followed the same pattern, however, the Truck Series race was aired by ESPN for two seasons as part of a different contract, before it switched to Speed Channel, who also aired the Goody's Dash Series race in 2002-2004, taking over from FX in 2001 (although in 2004 the Dash Series was no longer sanctioned by NASCAR).

In 2001, after CBS lost the rights to the Daytona 500, Ken Squier left CBS and joined Fox for a one-race arrangement as special contributor and studio host.

Year	Network	Pre-Race		Commentary		Pit reporters	Ratings	Viewers
Year	Network	Host	Pre-Race	Lap-by-lap	Color	Pit reporters	Ratings	Viewers
2001	Fox	Chris Myers	Jeff Hammond; Darrell Waltrip; Ken Squier	Mike Joy	Darrell Waltrip; Larry McReynolds	Dick Berggren; Steve Byrnes; Matt Yocum; Jeanne Zelasko	10.0/24	17.1 million
2002	NBC	Bill Weber	Benny Parsons	Allen Bestwick	Benny Parsons; Wally Dallenbach	Bill Weber; Marty Snider; Dave Burns; Matt Yocum	10.9/26	18.8 million
2003	Fox	Chris Myers	Jeff Hammond; Darrell Waltrip	Mike Joy	Darrell Waltrip; Larry McReynolds	Dick Berggren; Steve Byrnes; Matt Yocum; Jeanne Zelasko	9.8/21	16.8 million
2004	NBC	Bill Weber	Benny Parsons	Allen Bestwick	Benny Parsons; Wally Dallenbach	Bill Weber; Marty Snider; Dave Burns; Matt Yocum	10.6/24	17.8 million
2005	Fox	Chris Myers	Jeff Hammond; Darrell Waltrip	Mike Joy	Darrell Waltrip; Larry McReynolds	Dick Berggren; Steve Byrnes; Matt Yocum; Jeanne Zelasko	10.9/23	18.7 million
2006	NBC	Bill Weber	Benny Parsons	Bill Weber	Benny Parsons; Wally Dallenbach	Allen Bestwick; Marty Snider; Dave Burns; Matt Yocum	11.3/23	19.4 million

== Exclusive Fox era (2007–present) ==
Starting in 2007, Fox became the exclusive home of the Daytona 500 under the terms of NASCAR's new television package. Contract extensions signed in 2011 and 2012 extended the exclusive rights on Fox through the 2024 season.

Year	Network	Location	Pre-Race			Commentary		Pit reporters	Ratings	Viewers
Year	Network	Location	Host	Analysts	Rules	Lap-by-lap	Color	Pit reporters	Ratings	Viewers
2007	Fox	On Site	Chris Myers	Jeff Hammond; Darrell Waltrip	—N/a	Mike Joy	Darrell Waltrip; Larry McReynolds	Dick Berggren; Steve Byrnes; Matt Yocum; Krista Voda	10.1/20	17.5 million
2008	Fox	On Site	Chris Myers	Jeff Hammond; Darrell Waltrip	—N/a	Mike Joy	Darrell Waltrip; Larry McReynolds	Dick Berggren; Steve Byrnes; Matt Yocum; Krista Voda	10.2/20	17.8 million
2009	Fox	On Site	Chris Myers	Jeff Hammond; Darrell Waltrip	—N/a	Mike Joy	Darrell Waltrip; Larry McReynolds	Dick Berggren; Steve Byrnes; Matt Yocum; Krista Voda	9.2/19	16.0 million
2010	Fox	On Site	Chris Myers	Jeff Hammond; Darrell Waltrip	—N/a	Mike Joy	Darrell Waltrip; Larry McReynolds	Dick Berggren; Steve Byrnes; Matt Yocum; Krista Voda	7.7/16	13.3 million
2011	Fox	On Site	Chris Myers	Jeff Hammond; Darrell Waltrip	—N/a	Mike Joy	Darrell Waltrip; Larry McReynolds	Dick Berggren; Steve Byrnes; Matt Yocum; Krista Voda	8.7/20	15.6 million
2012	Fox	On Site	John Roberts	Michael Waltrip; Darrell Waltrip	—N/a	Mike Joy	Darrell Waltrip; Larry McReynolds	Dick Berggren; Steve Byrnes; Matt Yocum; Krista Voda	8.0/14	13.7 million
2013	Fox	On Site	Chris Myers	Michael Waltrip; Darrell Waltrip	—N/a	Mike Joy	Darrell Waltrip; Larry McReynolds	Steve Byrnes; Matt Yocum; Krista Voda; Jeff Hammond	9.9/22	16.7 million
2014	Fox	On Site	Chris Myers	Darrell Waltrip; Michael Waltrip; Jeff Hammond	—N/a	Mike Joy	Darrell Waltrip; Larry McReynolds	Steve Byrnes; Matt Yocum; Krista Voda	5.6/10	9.3 million
2015	Fox	On Site	Chris Myers	Michael Waltrip; Darrell Waltrip	Andy Petree	Mike Joy	Darrell Waltrip; Larry McReynolds	Matt Yocum; Jamie Little; Chris Neville; Vince Welch	7.7/17	13.4 million
2016	Fox	On Site	Chris Myers	Darrell Waltrip; Jeff Gordon; Michael Waltrip	Larry McReynolds	Mike Joy	Darrell Waltrip; Jeff Gordon	Matt Yocum; Jamie Little; Chris Neville; Vince Welch	6.6/12	11.4 million
2017	Fox	On Site	Chris Myers	Darrell Waltrip; Jeff Gordon; Michael Waltrip	Larry McReynolds	Mike Joy	Darrell Waltrip; Jeff Gordon	Matt Yocum; Jamie Little; Chris Neville; Vince Welch	6.6/15	12.0 million
2018	Fox	On Site	Chris Myers	Darrell Waltrip; Jeff Gordon; Michael Waltrip	Larry McReynolds	Mike Joy	Darrell Waltrip; Jeff Gordon	Matt Yocum; Jamie Little; Vince Welch; Regan Smith	5.3	9.8 million
2019	Fox	Studios	Shannon Spake	Larry McReynolds; Bobby Labonte; Ricky Craven	Larry McReynolds	Mike Joy	Darrell Waltrip; Jeff Gordon	Matt Yocum; Jamie Little; Vince Welch; Regan Smith	5.5	9.17 million
2019	Fox	On Site	Chris Myers	Darrell Waltrip; Jeff Gordon; Michael Waltrip	Larry McReynolds	Mike Joy	Darrell Waltrip; Jeff Gordon	Matt Yocum; Jamie Little; Vince Welch; Regan Smith	5.5	9.17 million
2020	Fox	Studios	Shannon Spake	Jamie McMurray; Larry McReynolds	Larry McReynolds	Mike Joy	Jeff Gordon	Matt Yocum; Jamie Little; Vince Welch; Regan Smith	4.4	7.33 million
2020	Fox	On Site	Chris Myers	Jeff Gordon; Michael Waltrip	Larry McReynolds	Mike Joy	Jeff Gordon	Matt Yocum; Jamie Little; Vince Welch; Regan Smith	4.4	7.33 million
2021	Fox	Studios	Shannon Spake	Larry McReynolds; Bobby Labonte	Larry McReynolds	Mike Joy	Jeff Gordon; Clint Bowyer	Jamie Little; Vince Welch; Regan Smith	2.8	4.91 million
2021	Fox	On Site	Chris Myers	Jeff Gordon; Clint Bowyer; Michael Waltrip	Larry McReynolds	Mike Joy	Jeff Gordon; Clint Bowyer	Jamie Little; Vince Welch; Regan Smith	2.8	4.91 million
2022	Fox	Studios	Shannon Spake	Jamie McMurray; Trevor Bayne; Larry McReynolds; Bobby Labonte	Larry McReynolds	Mike Joy	Clint Bowyer; Tony Stewart	Jamie Little; Vince Welch; Regan Smith	4.7	8.86 million
2022	Fox	On Site	Chris Myers	Clint Bowyer; Tony Stewart; Michael Waltrip	Larry McReynolds	Mike Joy	Clint Bowyer; Tony Stewart	Jamie Little; Vince Welch; Regan Smith	4.7	8.86 million
2023	Fox	Studios	Shannon Spake	Trevor Bayne; Larry McReynolds; Bobby Labonte	Larry McReynolds	Mike Joy	Clint Bowyer; Tony Stewart	Jamie Little; Regan Smith; Josh Sims	4.4	8.17 million
2023	Fox	On Site	Chris Myers	Clint Bowyer; Tony Stewart; Jamie McMurray; Michael Waltrip	Larry McReynolds	Mike Joy	Clint Bowyer; Tony Stewart	Jamie Little; Regan Smith; Josh Sims	4.4	8.17 million
2024	Fox	Studios	Shannon Spake	Trevor Bayne; Larry McReynolds; Bobby Labonte	Larry McReynolds	Mike Joy	Clint Bowyer; Kevin Harvick	Jamie Little; Regan Smith; Josh Sims	3.3	5.96 million
2024	Fox	On Site	Chris Myers	Clint Bowyer; Kevin Harvick; Jamie McMurray; Michael Waltrip	Larry McReynolds	Mike Joy	Clint Bowyer; Kevin Harvick	Jamie Little; Regan Smith; Josh Sims	3.3	5.96 million
2025	Fox	On Site	Chris Myers	Clint Bowyer; Kevin Harvick; Jamie McMurray; Michael Waltrip	Larry McReynolds	Mike Joy	Clint Bowyer; Kevin Harvick	Jamie Little; Regan Smith; Josh Sims	3.4	6.76 million
2026	Fox	On Site	Chris Myers	Clint Bowyer; Kevin Harvick; Jamie McMurray; Michael Waltrip	Larry McReynolds	Mike Joy	Clint Bowyer; Kevin Harvick	Jamie Little; Regan Smith; Josh Sims	3.7	7.48 million

=== Notes ===
- 2007
  - Race finished in prime-time hour (7 PM EST).
  - Per the current broadcast agreements, the Daytona 500 will be televised by Fox through 2024.
- 2010: Two delays totaling 150 minutes caused by track break up. Finished in prime-time.
- 2012: John Roberts replaced Chris Myers, who was placed on bereavement leave after his son's death during Speedweeks. Race delayed 30 hours by rain, then delayed a second time after a Lap 160 red flag caused by track issues following a jet fuel fire as a result of a crash. Race finished in late night hour (1 AM EST Tuesday / 10 PM PST Monday), after Fox typically signs off.
- 2014: Race finished in late-night hour (11 PM EST) and in prime-time (8 PM PST because of rain delays totaling 6 hours, 22 minutes.
- 2015: Race extended to 203 laps, 507.5 miles (816.7 km) due to a green-white-checker finish, Race got underway after oil dumped on the track.
- 2016
  - Jeff Gordon replaced Larry McReynolds in the booth for the race, as McReynolds moved to the studio.
  - Race is the first Daytona 500 to be broadcast live in virtual reality.

== See also ==
- Daytona 500
- NASCAR on television and radio

== Sources ==
- Daytona 500 numbers game.
  - Daytona 500 Ratings: Danica Lifts Overnights to Seven-Year High Daytona 500 Ratings: Danica Lifts Overnights to Seven-Year High
- NASCAR 'Daytona 500' TV Ratings History + Your Guess For This Year (Poll)
