= Lou Viglione =

American race car owner

Lou Viglione is a former NASCAR Winston Cup Series race car owner.

== Career ==
Viglione's career as a NASCAR owner spanned from 1974 to 1977.

Drivers under his employment included: Joe Mihalic, Jackie Rogers, David Sisco, and Ramo Stott. Out of 48 races, Viglione's drivers achieved six finishes in the "top ten." They also led 5 laps out of 9539 raced in total; along with earning $74,230 after driving for 13,948.1 miles (22,447.3 km). Lou's vehicles started and finished an average of 22nd place. Viglione has appeared at multiple Daytona 500 races as an owner (1974, 1975, 1976, 1977). His best finish as an owner occurred at the 1974 Southeastern 500; which resulted in a 7th place for Mihalic in his 1974 Chevrolet Chevelle Laguna.
