= 1976 Daytona 500 =

Auto race run in Florida in 1976

Race details
- Race 2 of 30 in the 1976 NASCAR Winston Cup Series
- 1976 Daytona 500 program cover
- Date: February 15, 1976
- Location: Daytona International Speedway; Daytona Beach, Florida, U.S.
- Course: Permanent racing facility 2.5 mi (4.023 km)
- Distance: 200 laps, 500 mi (804.672 km)
- Weather: Temperatures reaching up to 77 °F (25 °C); wind speeds approaching 14 miles per hour (23 km/h)
- Average speed: 152.181 miles per hour (244.912 km/h)

Pole position
Driver	Ramo Stott	Norris Reed

Qualifying race winners
Duel 1 Winner	Dave Marcis	Nord Krauskopf
Duel 2 Winner	Darrell Waltrip	DiGard Motorsports

Most laps led
Driver	A. J. Foyt	Ellington Racing
- Laps: 66

Winner
No. 21	David Pearson	Wood Brothers Racing

Television in the United States
- Network: ABC's WWOS
- Announcers: Bill Flemming; Jackie Stewart; Chris Economaki
- Nielsen ratings: 12.8/37 (18.3 million viewers)

The 1976 Daytona 500, the 18th running of the event, happened on Feb. 15th, 1976 at Daytona International Speedway, Daytona Beach, Fl. It is remembered for the late-race duel and accident between David Pearson and Richard Petty. Many fans consider this finish to be the greatest in the history of NASCAR. The end of the race was televised live on American network ABC.

These were the first Daytona 500 starts for Neil Bonnett, Terry Ryan, Salt Walther, D. K. Ulrich, Roy Smith, Jimmy Lee Capps, Skip Manning, Tighe Scott, Dick May, and Jimmy Means. For Terry Bivins, Johnny Ray, Dr. Dick Skillen, David Hobbs, and Tom Williams, this would be their only Daytona 500 start. Joe Frasson, Jackie Rogers, David Sisco, and Earl Ross would make their last Daytona 500s this year.

== Qualifying ==
USAC stock car racer Ramo Stott won his only career NASCAR pole position. There was a major speed discrepancy between cars in their qualification runs. Top teams were qualifying in the 178 miles per hour (286 km/h) to 179 miles per hour (288 km/h) range and a few teams qualified in the 186 miles per hour (299 km/h) range. Two of the teams who qualified in the 186 miles per hour (299 km/h) range were disqualified after NASCAR inspectors found suspicious extra fuel lines. Some teams attributed these lines to performance-enhancing nitrous oxide. One driver later admitted that he deliberately qualified slower to let the time from "offending" teams stick out.

In the 125-mile qualifying races, Dave Marcis won race 1, while Darrell Waltrip claimed race 2.

== Race ==
The opening laps were a battle for the lead between Buddy Baker, Waltrip, and David Pearson. A. J. Foyt rocketed from the rear to lead 68 laps before falling out with engine failure. An accident on lap 112 involving Johnny Ray and Skip Manning ended Ray's racing career.

Late in the race, Richard Petty and David Pearson were nose-to-tail, two laps ahead of all other competitors. On the final lap, Pearson passed Petty on the backstretch, and Petty attempted to re-pass in turn 3. Petty did not completely clear Pearson and the two cars made contact with each other and the wall, sending them spinning into the infield grass, just yards from the finish line. Petty's car stalled and would not re-fire. Pearson re-started his stricken car and crossed the finish line to win. Petty, with the help of a push-start from his crew, crossed the line for 2nd.

== Race results ==
Pos	Grid	No.	Driver	Entrant	Manufacturer	Laps	Winnings	Laps led	Time/Status	Points
1	7	21	David Pearson	Wood Brothers Racing	Mercury	200	$46,800	37	3:17:08	180
2	6	43	Richard Petty	Petty Enterprises	Dodge	199	$35,750	40	Crash (+50 yards)	175
3	32	72	Benny Parsons	L. G. DeWitt	Chevrolet	199	$23,680	16	+1 Lap	170
4	11	54	Lennie Pond	Ronnie Elder	Chevrolet	198	$16,890	0	+2 Laps	160
5	13	12	Neil Bonnett	Neil Bonnett	Chevrolet	197	$14,000	0	+3 Laps	155
6	2	81	Terry Ryan	Bill Monaghan	Chevrolet	196	$13,800	1	+4 Laps	155
7	41	70	J. D. McDuffie	McDuffie Racing	Chevrolet	193	$11,260	0	+7 Laps	146
8	19	63	Terry Bivins	Billy Moyer	Chevrolet	193	$9,665	6	+7 Laps	147
9	36	3	Richard Childress	Richard Childress Racing	Chevrolet	191	$8,990	0	+9 Laps	138
10	34	79	Frank Warren	Frank Warren	Dodge	190	$8,340	0	+10 Laps	134
11	37	67	Buddy Arrington	Buddy Arrington	Dodge	190	$6,720	0	+10 Laps	130
12	26	4	Salt Walther	Salt Walther	Chevrolet	187	$5,880	0	+13 Laps	–
13	42	8	Ed Negre	Ed Negre	Dodge	185	$5,310	0	+15 Laps	124
14	22	18	Joe Frasson	Joe Frasson	Chevrolet	183	$4,600	0	+17 Laps	121
15	23	60	Jackie Rogers	Lou Viglione	Chevrolet	183	$4,325	1	+17 Laps	123
16	15	95	Jim Hurtubise	Junior Miller	Chevrolet	180	$3,975	0	Engine	115
17	21	61	Joe Mihalic	Lou Viglione	Chevrolet	159	$3,575	0	+41 Laps	112
18	17	24	Cecil Gordon	Gordon Racing	Chevrolet	158	$4,160	0	+42 Laps	109
19	27	40	D. K. Ulrich	J. R. DeLotto	Chevrolet	151	$2,980	0	Axle	106
20	39	29	Roy Smith	Dick Midgley	Chevrolet	148	$2,690	0	Clutch	103
21	10	14	Coo Coo Marlin	H. B. Cunningham	Chevrolet	147	$3,345	0	Engine	100
22	31	28	A. J. Foyt	Hoss Ellington	Chevrolet	143	$4,600	66	Engine	–
23	29	48	James Hylton	James Hylton	Chevrolet	138	$2,785	0	+62 Laps	94
24	24	26	Jimmy Lee Capps	David Lee Sellers	Chevrolet	133	$2,090	0	Engine	91
25	8	2	Bobby Allison	Penske Racing	Mercury	123	$5,905	2	Engine	93
26	1	83	Ramo Stott	Norris Reed	Chevrolet	113	$6,830	0	Engine	–
27	3	71	Dave Marcis	Nord Krauskopf	Dodge	112	$7,895	0	+88 Laps	82
28	35	10	Johnny Ray	Clay Blackwell	Chevrolet	111	$2,270	0	Crash	79
29	40	05	David Sisco	David Sisco	Chevrolet	110	$2,020	0	+90 Laps	76
30	30	82	Skip Manning	Ferrel Harris	Dodge	107	$1,835	0	Crash	73
31	28	78	Dick Skillen	Tom Goff	Chevrolet	99	$1,770	0	Overheating	70
32	4	88	Darrell Waltrip	DiGard Racing	Chevrolet	87	$7,575	0	Engine	67
33	5	15	Buddy Baker	Bud Moore Engineering	Ford	83	$7,600	28	Engine	69
34	16	73	David Hobbs	L. G. DeWitt	Chevrolet	68	$1,900	2	Crash	66
35	18	30	Tighe Scott	Walter Ballard	Chevrolet	58	$2,340	0	Crash	58
36	33	47	Bruce Hill	Bruce Hill	Chevrolet	43	$1,725	0	Engine	55
37	25	38	Tom Williams	Tom Williams	Chevrolet	41	$1,615	0	Engine	52
38	38	33	Dick May	Hiram Handy	Chevrolet	36	$1,490	0	Engine	49
39	12	52	Earl Ross	L. G. DeWitt	Chevrolet	28	$2,025	0	Engine	46
40	20	5	Jimmy Means	Bill Gray	Chevrolet	20	$1,600	1	Engine	48
41	9	90	Dick Brooks	Donlavey Racing	Ford	5	$2,600	0	Engine	40
42	14	11	Cale Yarborough	Junior Johnson & Associates	Chevrolet	1	$4,725	0	Engine	37

== Standings after the race ==
Pos	Driver	Points	Differential
1	David Pearson	365	0
2	Benny Parsons	330	-35
3	Lennie Pond	310	-55
4	Richard Childress	286	-81
5	Richard Petty	268	-97
6	Frank Warren	264	-101
7	J.D. McDuffie	252	-113
8	D.K. Ulrich	233	-132
9	James Hylton	232	-133
10	Dave Marcis	229	-136
