= 1974 Daytona 500 =

Auto race run in Florida in 1974

Race details
- Race 2 of 30 in the 1974 NASCAR Winston Cup Series
- 1974 Daytona 500 program cover
- Date: February 17, 1974
- Location: Daytona International Speedway; Daytona Beach, Florida, U.S.
- Course: Permanent racing facility 2.5 mi (4.023 km)
- Distance: 180 laps, 450 mi (724.205 km)
- Scheduled distance: 200 laps, 500 mi (804.672 km)
- Weather: Temperatures reaching up to 81 °F (27 °C); wind speeds approaching 15 miles per hour (24 km/h)
- Average speed: 140.894 miles per hour (226.747 km/h)

Pole position
| Driver | David Pearson | Wood Brothers Racing |

Qualifying race winners
| Duel 1 Winner | Bobby Isaac | Banjo Matthews |
| Duel 2 Winner | Cale Yarborough | Richard Howard |

Most laps led
| Driver | Richard Petty | Petty Enterprises |
- Laps: 74

Winner
| No. 43 | Richard Petty | Petty Enterprises |

Television in the United States
- Network: ABC's Wide World of Sports
- Announcers: Keith Jackson; Jackie Stewart; Chris Economaki

The 1974 Daytona 500, the 16th running of the event, was won by Richard Petty (for the fifth time) after three hours, eleven minutes, and thirty-eight seconds of racing on February 17, 1974, at Daytona International Raceway in Daytona Beach, Florida, USA.

During the start of the 1974 NASCAR season, many races had their distance cut ten percent in response to the energy crisis of the year. As a result, the 1974 Daytona 500, won by Richard Petty (his second straight, making him the first driver ever to do it), was shortened to 180 laps (450 miles), as symbolically, the race "started" on Lap 21 and the race is often known as the Daytona 450. The Twin 125 qualifying races (won by Bobby Isaac in a Banjo Matthews Chevrolet and Cale Yarborough in the Richard Howard Chevy prepared by Junior Johnson) were also shortened to 45 laps (112.5 miles).

== Summary ==
First Daytona 500 starts for Bob Burcham, Richie Panch, George Follmer, Lennie Pond, Jackie Rogers, Joe Mihalic, and Richard Childress. Only Daytona 500 starts for Jimmy Crawford, L. D. Ottinger, Dick Simon, Tony Bettenhausen Jr., and Dan Daughtry. Last Daytona 500 starts for Bobby Isaac and Gary Bettenhausen.

Coo Coo Marlin would get his only ever lead lap finish at this race.

ABC Sports announced a week before the race that the event's second half would be televised live, opening with a recap of the event's opening laps. Keith Jackson handled play-by-play commentary with Jackie Stewart providing color commentary. Chris Economaki reported from pit road.

The race was the most competitive in Daytona history with 59 official lead changes (a record that stood until the 2011 Daytona 500, which saw 74 lead changes) among 15 leaders (this record was tied in 1989, then broken in 2006 at 18 and 2010 at 21, and 2011 with 22). The number of leaders was nearly 16; on Lap 51 Cale Yarborough passed Johnny Rutherford and George Follmer passed Yarborough in Turn Three; Yarborough repassed Follmer before the start-finish line thus officially leading the lap.

Richard Petty and Donnie Allison combined to lead 29 times for 120 laps while other strong cars included Yarborough, Bobby Allison, A. J. Foyt (who started 35th), Coo Coo Marlin (started 31st), and pole-sitter David Pearson.

The race saw two dramatic changes in outcome in the final twenty laps. Richard Petty cut a tire and had to pit under green with 19 laps to go, putting Donnie Allison into the lead. But with 11 laps to go, Bob Burcham blew an engine in the trioval just in front of Donnie Allison. It caused Allison's Chevy to blow out a tire and spin out near turn one while leading. Allison then lost a lap limping back to pit road to get fresh tires. Petty re-took the lead and won by a margin of 47 seconds. Yarborough was second, followed by Ramo Stott, Marlin, Foyt, and Donnie Allison. Marlin might have finished second, but mistook the white flag for the checkered, since both were being displayed when they crossed the line to get the white flag, as Petty was right behind them. Marlin let off on the back straightaway, and lost second to Yarborough, while Stott, known at the time mostly for his USAC stock car prowess, followed to take third, while Marlin had to settle for fourth.

== Race results ==
| Pos | Grid | No. | Driver | Entrant | Manufacturer | Laps | Winnings | Laps led | Time/Status |
|---|---|---|---|---|---|---|---|---|---|
| 1 | 2 | 43 | Richard Petty | Petty Enterprises | 1974 Dodge | 200 | $39,650 | 74 | 3:11:38 |
| 2 | 4 | 11 | Cale Yarborough | Richard Howard | 1974 Chevrolet | 200 | $21,250 | 9 | +47 Seconds |
| 3 | 12 | 83 | Ramo Stott | Norris Reed | 1974 Chevrolet | 200 | $11,390 | 0 | Lead lap, under green flag |
| 4 | 31 | 14 | Coo Coo Marlin | H. B. Cunningham | 1973 Chevrolet | 200 | $8,350 | 7 | Lead lap, under green flag |
| 5 | 35 | 50 | A. J. Foyt | A. J. Foyt Enterprises | 1974 Chevrolet | 199 | $8,465 | 6 | +1 Lap |
| 6 | 7 | 88 | Donnie Allison | DiGard Racing | 1974 Chevrolet | 199 | $7,650 | 41 | +1 Lap |
| 7 | 11 | 95 | Darrell Waltrip | Darrell Waltrip | 1973 Chevrolet | 199 | $5,900 | 1 | +1 Lap |
| 8 | 3 | 27 | Bobby Isaac | Banjo Matthews | 1974 Chevrolet | 198 | $6,825 | 0 | +2 Laps |
| 9 | 23 | 32 | Dick Brooks | Dick Brooks | 1974 Dodge | 197 | $5,050 | 0 | Suspension |
| 10 | 18 | 30 | Walter Ballard | Vic Ballard | 1974 Chevrolet | 197 | $5,410 | 2 | +3 Laps |
| 11 | 22 | 52 | Earl Ross | Allan Brooke | 1972 Chevrolet | 197 | $4,560 | 0 | +3 Laps |
| 12 | 34 | 16 | Gary Bettenhausen | Penske Racing | 1974 Matador | 196 | $4,225 | 0 | +4 Laps |
| 13 | 32 | 24 | Cecil Gordon | Cecil Gordon | 1972 Chevrolet | 196 | $4,750 | 1 | +4 Laps |
| 14 | 40 | 2 | Dave Marcis | Marcis Auto Racing | 1973 Dodge | 196 | $4,435 | 0 | +4 Laps |
| 15 | 38 | 05 | David Sisco | David Sisco | 1974 Chevrolet | 195 | $4,275 | 2 | +5 Laps |
| 16 | 19 | 48 | James Hylton | James Hylton | 1973 Chevrolet | 193 | $4,325 | 9 | +7 Laps |
| 17 | 16 | 57 | Bob Burcham | Jack White | 1974 Chevrolet | 185 | $3,820 | 0 | Engine |
| 18 | 29 | 98 | Richie Panch | Roy Thornley | 1972 Ford | 180 | $3,770 | 1 | +20 Laps |
| 19 | 33 | 22 | Jimmy Crawford | Crawford Brothers | 1972 Plymouth | 176 | $3,775 | 0 | +24 Laps |
| 20 | 5 | 15 | George Follmer | Bud Moore Engineering | 1973 Ford | 165 | $7,400 | 0 | Engine |
| 21 | 15 | 90 | Bill Dennis | Donlavey Racing | 1972 Ford | 161 | $4,220 | 0 | Engine |
| 22 | 10 | 72 | Benny Parsons | L. G. DeWitt | 1974 Chevrolet | 141 | $7,700 | 1 | Ignition |
| 23 | 21 | 54 | Lennie Pond | Ronnie Elder | 1974 Chevrolet | 135 | $4,135 | 0 | Suspension |
| 24 | 17 | 61 | Johnny Rutherford | Don Bierschwale | 1974 Chevrolet | 116 | $3,735 | 2 | Clutch |
| 25 | 20 | 56 | Jim Hurtubise | Dan Bray | 1972 Chevrolet | 112 | $3,600 | 0 | Crash |
| 26 | 24 | 18 | Joe Frasson | Joe Frasson | 1973 Dodge | 111 | $3,550 | 0 | Engine |
| 27 | 6 | 31 | Jim Vandiver | O. L. Nixon | 1972 Dodge | 108 | $4,225 | 0 | Radiator |
| 28 | 30 | 70 | J. D. McDuffie | McDuffie Racing | 1972 Chevrolet | 108 | $4,850 | 0 | Engine |
| 29 | 39 | 02 | L. D. Ottinger | Russell Large | 1974 Chevrolet | 100 | $3,390 | 0 | Hood pin |
| 30 | 9 | 12 | Bobby Allison | Bobby Allison Motorsports | 1974 Chevrolet | 97 | $6,800 | 19 | Engine |
| 31 | 37 | 5 | Dick Simon | Doc Faustina | 1973 Dodge | 96 | $3,410 | 0 | Engine |
| 32 | 14 | 93 | Jackie Rogers | Ray Frederick | 1974 Chevrolet | 89 | $3,500 | 0 | Driver injury |
| 33 | 26 | 9 | Tony Bettenhausen Jr. | Gordon Van Liew | 1972 Chevrolet | 75 | $3,365 | 0 | Engine |
| 34 | 28 | 79 | Frank Warren | Frank Warren | 1974 Dodge | 63 | $3,830 | 0 | Engine |
| 35 | 1 | 21 | David Pearson | Wood Brothers Racing | 1973 Mercury | 61 | $9,035 | 5 | Exhaust |
| 36 | 13 | 28 | Charlie Glotzbach | Hoss Ellington | 1974 Chevrolet | 48 | $4,150 | 0 | Windshield |
| 37 | 25 | 60 | Joe Mihalic | Lou Viglione | 1974 Chevrolet | 37 | $3,365 | 0 | Crash |
| 38 | 27 | 35 | Dan Daughtry | Morris Davis | 1972 Ford | 28 | $3,230 | 0 | Crash |
| 39 | 8 | 04 | Hershel McGriff | Petty Enterprises | 1974 Dodge | 23 | $3,375 | 0 | Crash |
| 40 | 36 | 96 | Richard Childress | Tom Garn | 1973 Chevrolet | 22 | $3,700 | 0 | Engine |
