= 2026 Daytona 500 =

68th Running of the Daytona 500, held at Daytona International Speedway

Race details
- Race 1 of 36 in the 2026 NASCAR Cup Series
- 2026 Daytona 500 logo
- Date: February 15, 2026
- Location: Daytona International Speedway in Daytona Beach, Florida
- Course: Permanent racing facility 2.5 mi (4 km)
- Distance: 200 laps, 500 mi (800 km)
- Weather: Partly Cloudy with a temperature around 81 °F (27 °C); wind out of the west at 20 miles per hour (32 km/h).
- Average speed: 147.107 miles per hour (236.746 km/h)

Pole position
Driver	Kyle Busch	Richard Childress Racing
- Time: 49.006

Qualifying race winners
Duel 1 Winner	Joey Logano	Team Penske
Duel 2 Winner	Chase Elliott	Hendrick Motorsports

Most laps led
Driver	Bubba Wallace	23XI Racing
- Laps: 40

Fastest lap
Driver	Carson Hocevar	Spire Motorsports
- Time: 45.584

Winner
No. 45	Tyler Reddick	23XI Racing

Television in the United States
- Network: FOX
- Announcers: Mike Joy, Clint Bowyer, and Kevin Harvick
- Nielsen ratings: 7.489 million

Radio in the United States
- Radio: MRN
- Booth announcers: Alex Hayden, Mike Bagley, and Todd Gordon
- Turn announcers: Dave Moody (1 & 2), Kyle Rickey (Backstretch), and Tim Catalfamo (3 & 4)

The 2026 Daytona 500 was a NASCAR Cup Series race and the 68th running of the event. It was held on Sunday, February 15, 2026, at Daytona International Speedway in Daytona Beach, Florida. It was the first race of the 2026 NASCAR Cup Series season. The race was Kyle Busch's final Daytona 500 as well as his final cup series pole before his death on May 21, 2026.

The race saw 65 lead changes, with a total of 26 different leaders (out of a 41-car field) being a Daytona 500 record. 23XI Racing's Tyler Reddick avoided multiple accidents on the final lap and passed Chase Elliott just before the start/finish line to claim both his and the team's first Daytona 500 victory, as well as the ninth win of his Cup Series career and his first since the 2024 Straight Talk Wireless 400 at Homestead. Ricky Stenhouse Jr. finished 2nd, and Joey Logano finished 3rd. Elliott and Brad Keselowski rounded out the top five, and Zane Smith, Chris Buescher, Riley Herbst, Josh Berry, and Bubba Wallace rounded out the top ten.

== Report ==
=== Background ===
The layout of the Daytona International Speedway.

Daytona International Speedway is one of three superspeedways to hold NASCAR races, the other two being Atlanta Motor Speedway and Talladega Superspeedway. The standard track at Daytona International Speedway is a four-turn superspeedway that is 2.5 miles (4.0 km) long. The track's turns are banked at 31 degrees, while the front stretch, the location of the finish line, is banked at 18 degrees.

In 2026, the Daytona 500 will be held on its traditional Presidents' Day weekend. However, Daytona announced on October 22, 2025, that the 2027 Daytona 500 would be a week later, held on February 21, 2027, to avoid a conflict with the Super Bowl.

For the second consecutive year, 41 cars will be in the Daytona 500, Jimmie Johnson is guaranteed a spot with the Open Exemption Provisional (OEP).

==== Entry list ====
- (R) denotes rookie driver.
- (W) denotes former winner.
- (i) denotes driver who is ineligible for series driver points.

No.	Driver	Team	Manufacturer
1	Ross Chastain	Trackhouse Racing	Chevrolet
2	Austin Cindric (W)	Team Penske	Ford
3	Austin Dillon (W)	Richard Childress Racing	Chevrolet
4	Noah Gragson	Front Row Motorsports	Ford
5	Kyle Larson	Hendrick Motorsports	Chevrolet
6	Brad Keselowski	RFK Racing	Ford
7	Daniel Suárez	Spire Motorsports	Chevrolet
8	Kyle Busch	Richard Childress Racing	Chevrolet
9	Chase Elliott	Hendrick Motorsports	Chevrolet
10	Ty Dillon	Kaulig Racing	Chevrolet
11	Denny Hamlin (W)	Joe Gibbs Racing	Toyota
12	Ryan Blaney	Team Penske	Ford
16	A. J. Allmendinger	Kaulig Racing	Chevrolet
17	Chris Buescher	RFK Racing	Ford
19	Chase Briscoe	Joe Gibbs Racing	Toyota
20	Christopher Bell	Joe Gibbs Racing	Toyota
21	Josh Berry	Wood Brothers Racing	Ford
22	Joey Logano (W)	Team Penske	Ford
23	Bubba Wallace	23XI Racing	Toyota
24	William Byron (W)	Hendrick Motorsports	Chevrolet
34	Todd Gilliland	Front Row Motorsports	Ford
35	Riley Herbst	23XI Racing	Toyota
36	Chandler Smith (i)	Front Row Motorsports	Ford
38	Zane Smith	Front Row Motorsports	Ford
40	Justin Allgaier (i)	JR Motorsports	Chevrolet
41	Cole Custer	Haas Factory Team	Chevrolet
42	John Hunter Nemechek	Legacy Motor Club	Toyota
43	Erik Jones	Legacy Motor Club	Toyota
44	J. J. Yeley (i)	NY Racing Team	Chevrolet
45	Tyler Reddick	23XI Racing	Toyota
47	Ricky Stenhouse Jr. (W)	Hyak Motorsports	Chevrolet
48	Alex Bowman	Hendrick Motorsports	Chevrolet
51	Cody Ware	Rick Ware Racing	Chevrolet
54	Ty Gibbs	Joe Gibbs Racing	Toyota
60	Ryan Preece	RFK Racing	Ford
62	Anthony Alfredo (i)	Beard Motorsports	Chevrolet
66	Casey Mears	Garage 66	Ford
67	Corey Heim (i)	23XI Racing	Toyota
71	Michael McDowell (W)	Spire Motorsports	Chevrolet
77	Carson Hocevar	Spire Motorsports	Chevrolet
78	B. J. McLeod	Live Fast Motorsports	Chevrolet
84	Jimmie Johnson (W)	Legacy Motor Club	Toyota
88	Connor Zilisch (R)	Trackhouse Racing	Chevrolet
97	Shane van Gisbergen	Trackhouse Racing	Chevrolet
99	Corey LaJoie	RFK Racing	Ford
Official entry list

== First practice ==
Austin Cindric was the fastest in the first practice session with a time of 48.025 seconds and a speed of 187.402 mph (301.594 km/h).

Pos	No.	Driver	Team	Manufacturer	Time	Speed
1	2	Austin Cindric	Team Penske	Ford	48.025	187.402
2	1	Ross Chastain	Trackhouse Racing	Chevrolet	48.146	186.931
3	99	Corey LaJoie	RFK Racing	Ford	48.253	186.517
Official first practice results

== Qualifying ==
Kyle Busch scored the pole for the race with a time of 49.006 and a speed of 183.651 mph (295.558 km/h). Noah Gragson had his time disallowed for using his hand to deflect air and attempting to gain an advantage.

=== Qualifying results ===
Pos	No.	Driver	Team	Manufacturer	R1	R2
1	8	Kyle Busch	Richard Childress Racing	Chevrolet	48.933	49.006
2	19	Chase Briscoe	Joe Gibbs Racing	Toyota	49.034	49.022
3	60	Ryan Preece	RFK Racing	Ford	49.081	49.061
4	11	Denny Hamlin	Joe Gibbs Racing	Toyota	49.105	49.100
5	67	Corey Heim (i)	23XI Racing	Toyota	49.138	49.147
6	48	Alex Bowman	Hendrick Motorsports	Chevrolet	49.117	49.152
7	5	Kyle Larson	Hendrick Motorsports	Chevrolet	49.121	49.158
8	17	Chris Buescher	RFK Racing	Ford	49.168	49.184
9	9	Chase Elliott	Hendrick Motorsports	Chevrolet	49.170	49.220
10	22	Joey Logano	Team Penske	Ford	49.172	49.275
11	54	Ty Gibbs	Joe Gibbs Racing	Toyota	49.184	—
12	3	Austin Dillon	Richard Childress Racing	Chevrolet	49.185	—
13	20	Christopher Bell	Joe Gibbs Racing	Toyota	49.197	—
14	40	Justin Allgaier (i)	JR Motorsports	Chevrolet	49.201	—
15	99	Corey LaJoie	RFK Racing	Ford	49.205	—
16	42	John Hunter Nemechek	Legacy Motor Club	Toyota	49.214	—
17	2	Austin Cindric	Team Penske	Ford	49.248	—
18	6	Brad Keselowski	RFK Racing	Ford	49.252	—
19	38	Zane Smith	Front Row Motorsports	Ford	49.266	—
20	12	Ryan Blaney	Team Penske	Ford	49.269	—
21	71	Michael McDowell	Spire Motorsports	Chevrolet	49.280	—
22	24	William Byron	Hendrick Motorsports	Chevrolet	49.282	—
23	88	Connor Zilisch (R)	Trackhouse Racing	Chevrolet	49.291	—
24	41	Cole Custer	Haas Factory Team	Chevrolet	49.322	—
25	43	Erik Jones	Legacy Motor Club	Toyota	49.332	—
26	51	Cody Ware	Rick Ware Racing	Chevrolet	49.350	—
27	21	Josh Berry	Wood Brothers Racing	Ford	49.354	—
28	84	Jimmie Johnson	Legacy Motor Club	Toyota	49.366	—
29	77	Carson Hocevar	Spire Motorsports	Chevrolet	49.427	—
30	23	Bubba Wallace	23XI Racing	Toyota	49.432	—
31	35	Riley Herbst	23XI Racing	Toyota	49.452	—
32	16	A. J. Allmendinger	Kaulig Racing	Chevrolet	49.460	—
33	34	Todd Gilliland	Front Row Motorsports	Ford	49.460	—
34	1	Ross Chastain	Trackhouse Racing	Chevrolet	49.483	—
35	62	Anthony Alfredo (i)	Beard Motorsports	Chevrolet	49.485	—
36	10	Ty Dillon	Kaulig Racing	Chevrolet	49.497	—
37	97	Shane van Gisbergen	Trackhouse Racing	Chevrolet	49.527	—
38	47	Ricky Stenhouse Jr.	Hyak Motorsports	Chevrolet	49.529	—
39	7	Daniel Suárez	Spire Motorsports	Chevrolet	49.552	—
40	45	Tyler Reddick	23XI Racing	Toyota	49.609	—
41	36	Chandler Smith (i)	Front Row Motorsports	Ford	49.758	—
42	78	B. J. McLeod	Live Fast Motorsports	Chevrolet	50.011	—
43	66	Casey Mears	Garage 66	Ford	50.233	—
44	44	J. J. Yeley (i)	NY Racing Team	Chevrolet	50.482	—
45	4	Noah Gragson	Front Row Motorsports	Ford	0.000	—
Official qualifying results

== The Duel at Daytona ==
The Duels at Daytona are a pair of NASCAR Cup Series races held in conjunction with the Daytona 500 annually in February at Daytona International Speedway. They consist of two races 60 laps and 150 miles (240 km) in length, which serve as heat races that set the lineup for the Daytona 500. Both races sets the lineup for positions 3–32. The first race sets the lineup for cars that qualified in odd–numbered positions on pole qualifying day. The second race sets the lineup for cars that qualified in even–numbered positions. Positions 33–36 are filled by the four drivers that posted the fastest lap in pole qualifying that didn't lock in a position in the Duel's. Positions 37–40 are set by the four cars highest in the 2019 owner's points that didn't lock in a position in the Duels and weren't among the cars that posted the four fastest timed laps in pole qualifying.

=== Duel 1 ===
==== Duel 1 results ====
Pos	Grid	No	Driver	Team	Manufacturer	Laps	Points
1	6	22	Joey Logano	Team Penske	Ford	63	10
2	11	12	Ryan Blaney	Team Penske	Ford	63	9
3	7	3	Austin Dillon	Richard Childress Racing	Chevrolet	63	8
4	10	6	Brad Keselowski	RFK Racing	Ford	63	7
5	9	42	John Hunter Nemechek	Legacy Motor Club	Toyota	63	6
6	19	97	Shane van Gisbergen	Trackhouse Racing	Chevrolet	63	5
7	20	7	Daniel Suárez	Spire Motorsports	Chevrolet	63	4
8	22	66	Casey Mears	Garage 66	Ford	63	3
9	2	60	Ryan Preece	RFK Racing	Ford	63	2
10	4	48	Alex Bowman	Hendrick Motorsports	Chevrolet	63	1
11	13	41	Cole Custer	Haas Factory Team	Chevrolet	63	0
12	23	4	Noah Gragson	Front Row Motorsports	Ford	63	0
13	16	23	Bubba Wallace	23XI Racing	Toyota	63	0
14	3	67	Corey Heim (i)	23XI Racing	Toyota	63	0
15	15	84	Jimmie Johnson	Legacy Motor Club	Toyota	63	0
16	21	36	Chandler Smith (i)	Front Row Motorsports	Ford	63	0
17	14	51	Cody Ware	Rick Ware Racing	Chevrolet	63	0
18	1	8	Kyle Busch	Richard Childress Racing	Chevrolet	63	0
19	8	99	Corey LaJoie	RFK Racing	Ford	62	0
20	17	16	A. J. Allmendinger	Kaulig Racing	Chevrolet	62	0
21	18	1	Ross Chastain	Trackhouse Racing	Chevrolet	62	0
22	12	24	William Byron	Hendrick Motorsports	Chevrolet	55	0
23	5	17	Chris Buescher	RFK Racing	Ford	55	0
Official race results

=== Duel 2 ===
==== Duel 2 results ====
Pos	Grid	No	Driver	Team	Manufacturer	Laps	Points
1	4	9	Chase Elliott	Hendrick Motorsports	Chevrolet	60	10
2	14	77	Carson Hocevar	Spire Motorsports	Chevrolet	60	9
3	3	5	Kyle Larson	Hendrick Motorsports	Chevrolet	60	8
4	10	71	Michael McDowell	Spire Motorsports	Chevrolet	60	7
5	6	20	Christopher Bell	Joe Gibbs Racing	Toyota	60	6
6	13	21	Josh Berry	Wood Brothers Racing	Ford	60	5
7	19	47	Ricky Stenhouse Jr.	Hyak Motorsports	Chevrolet	60	4
8	16	34	Todd Gilliland	Front Row Motorsports	Ford	60	3
9	5	54	Ty Gibbs	Joe Gibbs Racing	Toyota	60	2
10	2	11	Denny Hamlin	Joe Gibbs Racing	Toyota	60	1
11	12	43	Erik Jones	Legacy Motor Club	Toyota	60	0
12	20	45	Tyler Reddick	Legacy Motor Club	Toyota	60	0
13	15	35	Riley Herbst	23XI Racing	Toyota	60	0
14	9	38	Zane Smith	Front Row Motorsports	Ford	60	0
15	11	88	Connor Zilisch (R)	Trackhouse Racing	Chevrolet	60	0
16	18	10	Ty Dillon	Kaulig Racing	Chevrolet	60	0
17	8	2	Austin Cindric	Team Penske	Ford	60	0
18	21	78	B. J. McLeod	Live Fast Motorsports	Chevrolet	60	0
19	1	19	Chase Briscoe	Joe Gibbs Racing	Toyota	60	0
20	7	40	Justin Allgaier (i)	JR Motorsports	Chevrolet	60	0
21	22	44	J. J. Yeley (i)	NY Racing Team	Chevrolet	57	0
DSQ	17	62	Anthony Alfredo (i)	Beard Motorsports	Chevrolet	60	0
Official race results

=== Starting lineup ===
Pos	No.	Driver	Team	Manufacturer	Notes
1	8	Kyle Busch	Richard Childress Racing	Chevrolet	Fastest in pole qualifying
2	19	Chase Briscoe	Joe Gibbs Racing	Toyota	Second in pole qualifying
3	22	Joey Logano	Team Penske	Ford	Duel 1 Winner
4	9	Chase Elliott	Hendrick Motorsports	Chevrolet	Duel 2 Winner
5	12	Ryan Blaney	Team Penske	Ford	Second in Duel 1
6	77	Carson Hocevar	Spire Motorsports	Chevrolet	Second in Duel 2
7	3	Austin Dillon	Richard Childress Racing	Chevrolet	Third in Duel 1
8	5	Kyle Larson	Hendrick Motorsports	Chevrolet	Third in Duel 2
9	6	Brad Keselowski	RFK Racing	Ford	Fourth in Duel 1
10	71	Michael McDowell	Spire Motorsports	Chevrolet	Fourth in Duel 2
11	42	John Hunter Nemechek	Legacy Motor Club	Toyota	Fifth in Duel 1
12	20	Christopher Bell	Joe Gibbs Racing	Toyota	Fifth in Duel 2
13	97	Shane van Gisbergen	Trackhouse Racing	Chevrolet	Sixth in Duel 1
14	21	Josh Berry	Wood Brothers Racing	Ford	Sixth in Duel 2
15	7	Daniel Suárez	Spire Motorsports	Chevrolet	Seventh in Duel 1
16	47	Ricky Stenhouse Jr.	Hyak Motorsports	Chevrolet	Seventh in Duel 2
17	66	Casey Mears	Garage 66	Ford	Eighth in Duel 1
18	34	Todd Gilliland	Front Row Motorsports	Ford	Eighth in Duel 2
19	60	Ryan Preece	RFK Racing	Ford	Ninth in Duel 1
20	54	Ty Gibbs	Joe Gibbs Racing	Toyota	Ninth in Duel 2
21	48	Alex Bowman	Hendrick Motorsports	Chevrolet	Tenth in Duel 1
22	11	Denny Hamlin	Joe Gibbs Racing	Toyota	Tenth in Duel 2
23	41	Cole Custer	Haas Factory Team	Chevrolet	Eleventh in Duel 1
24	43	Erik Jones	Legacy Motor Club	Toyota	Eleventh in Duel 2
25	4	Noah Gragson	Front Row Motorsports	Ford	Twelfth in Duel 1
26	45	Tyler Reddick	23XI Racing	Toyota	Twelfth in Duel 2
27	23	Bubba Wallace	23XI Racing	Toyota	Thirteenth in Duel 1
28	35	Riley Herbst	23XI Racing	Toyota	Thirteenth in Duel 2
29	67	Corey Heim (i)	23XI Racing	Toyota	Fourteenth in Duel 1
30	38	Zane Smith	Front Row Motorsports	Ford	Fourteenth in Duel 2
31	84	Jimmie Johnson	Legacy Motor Club	Toyota	Fifteenth in Duel 1
32	88	Connor Zilisch (R)	Trackhouse Racing	Chevrolet	Fifteenth in Duel 2
33	51	Cody Ware	Rick Ware Racing	Chevrolet	Seventeenth in Duel 1
34	10	Ty Dillon	Kaulig Racing	Chevrolet	Sixteenth in Duel 2
35	16	A. J. Allmendinger	Kaulig Racing	Chevrolet	20th in Duel 1
36	2	Austin Cindric	Team Penske	Ford	Seventeenth in Duel 2
37	1	Ross Chastain	Trackhouse Racing	Chevrolet	21st in Duel 1
38	78	B. J. McLeod	Live Fast Motorsports	Chevrolet	Nineteenth in Duel 2
39	24	William Byron	Hendrick Motorsports	Chevrolet	22nd in Duel 1
40	40	Justin Allgaier (i)	JR Motorsports	Chevrolet	20th in Duel 2
41	17	Chris Buescher	RFK Racing	Ford	23rd in Duel 1
Did not qualify
42	36	Chandler Smith (i)	Front Row Motorsports	Ford	
43	99	Corey LaJoie	RFK Racing	Ford	
44	44	J. J. Yeley (i)	NY Racing Team	Chevrolet	
45	62	Anthony Alfredo (i)	Beard Motorsports	Chevrolet	Disallowed after post-race inspection
Official starting lineup

== Practice (post-Duels) ==
=== Second practice ===
Austin Dillon was the fastest in the second practice session with a time of 46.006 seconds and a speed of 195.627 mph (314.831 km/h).

Pos	No.	Driver	Team	Manufacturer	Time	Speed
1	3	Austin Dillon	Richard Childress Racing	Chevrolet	46.006	195.627
2	48	Alex Bowman	Hendrick Motorsports	Chevrolet	46.049	195.452
3	40	Justin Allgaier (i)	JR Motorsports	Chevrolet	46.137	195.071
Official second practice results

=== Final practice ===
Ryan Preece was the fastest in the final practice session with a time of 46.676 seconds and a speed of 192.819 mph (310.312 km/h).

Pos	No.	Driver	Team	Manufacturer	Time	Speed
1	60	Ryan Preece	RFK Racing	Ford	46.676	192.819
2	17	Chris Buescher	RFK Racing	Ford	46.684	192.786
3	6	Brad Keselowski	RFK Racing	Ford	46.733	192.583
Official final practice results

== Race ==
=== Race results ===
==== Stage Results ====
Stage One Laps: 65

Pos	No	Driver	Team	Manufacturer	Points
1	38	Zane Smith	Front Row Motorsports	Ford	10
2	2	Austin Cindric	Team Penske	Ford	9
3	12	Ryan Blaney	Team Penske	Ford	8
4	77	Carson Hocevar	Spire Motorsports	Chevrolet	7
5	7	Daniel Suárez	Spire Motorsports	Chevrolet	6
6	17	Chris Buescher	RFK Racing	Ford	5
7	71	Michael McDowell	Spire Motorsports	Chevrolet	4
8	60	Ryan Preece	RFK Racing	Ford	3
9	48	Alex Bowman	Hendrick Motorsports	Chevrolet	2
10	4	Noah Gragson	Front Row Motorsports	Ford	1

Stage Two Laps: 65

Pos	No	Driver	Team	Manufacturer	Points
1	23	Bubba Wallace	23XI Racing	Toyota	10
2	12	Ryan Blaney	Team Penske	Ford	9
3	42	John Hunter Nemechek	Legacy Motor Club	Toyota	8
4	8	Kyle Busch	Richard Childress Racing	Chevrolet	7
5	35	Riley Herbst	23XI Racing	Toyota	6
6	67	Corey Heim (i)	23XI Racing	Toyota	0
7	17	Chris Buescher	RFK Racing	Ford	4
8	45	Tyler Reddick	23XI Racing	Toyota	3
9	22	Joey Logano	Team Penske	Ford	2
10	7	Daniel Suárez	Spire Motorsports	Chevrolet	1

=== Final Stage results ===
Stage Three Laps: 70

Pos	Grid	No	Driver	Team	Manufacturer	Laps	Points
1	26	45	Tyler Reddick	23XI Racing	Toyota	200	58
2	16	47	Ricky Stenhouse Jr.	Hyak Motorsports	Chevrolet	200	35
3	3	22	Joey Logano	Team Penske	Ford	200	36
4	4	9	Chase Elliott	Hendrick Motorsports	Chevrolet	200	33
5	9	6	Brad Keselowski	RFK Racing	Ford	200	32
6	30	38	Zane Smith	Front Row Motorsports	Ford	200	41
7	41	17	Chris Buescher	RFK Racing	Ford	200	39
8	28	35	Riley Herbst	23XI Racing	Toyota	200	35
9	14	21	Josh Berry	Wood Brothers Racing	Ford	200	28
10	27	23	Bubba Wallace	23XI Racing	Toyota	200	37
11	25	4	Noah Gragson	Front Row Motorsports	Ford	200	27
12	39	24	William Byron	Hendrick Motorsports	Chevrolet	200	25
13	15	7	Daniel Suárez	Spire Motorsports	Chevrolet	200	31
14	34	10	Ty Dillon	Kaulig Racing	Chevrolet	200	23
15	1	8	Kyle Busch	Richard Childress Racing	Chevrolet	200	29
16	8	5	Kyle Larson	Hendrick Motorsports	Chevrolet	200	21
17	33	51	Cody Ware	Rick Ware Racing	Chevrolet	200	20
18	6	77	Carson Hocevar	Spire Motorsports	Chevrolet	200	27
19	35	16	A. J. Allmendinger	Kaulig Racing	Chevrolet	200	18
20	37	1	Ross Chastain	Trackhouse Racing	Chevrolet	200	17
21	24	43	Erik Jones	Legacy Motor Club	Toyota	200	16
22	10	71	Michael McDowell	Spire Motorsports	Chevrolet	200	19
23	20	54	Ty Gibbs	Joe Gibbs Racing	Toyota	200	14
24	23	41	Cole Custer	Haas Factory Team	Chevrolet	200	13
25	19	60	Ryan Preece	RFK Racing	Ford	200	15
26	11	42	John Hunter Nemechek	Legacy Motor Club	Toyota	199	19
27	5	12	Ryan Blaney	Team Penske	Ford	199	27
28	29	67	Corey Heim (i)	23XI Racing	Toyota	199	0
29	31	84	Jimmie Johnson	Legacy Motor Club	Toyota	199	0
30	13	97	Shane van Gisbergen	Trackhouse Racing	Chevrolet	199	8
31	22	11	Denny Hamlin	Joe Gibbs Racing	Toyota	198	7
32	17	66	Casey Mears	Garage 66	Ford	195	6
33	32	88	Connor Zilisch (R)	Trackhouse Racing	Chevrolet	195	5
34	36	2	Austin Cindric	Team Penske	Ford	193	13
35	12	20	Christopher Bell	Joe Gibbs Racing	Toyota	191	3
36	2	19	Chase Briscoe	Joe Gibbs Racing	Toyota	188	2
37	7	3	Austin Dillon	Richard Childress Racing	Chevrolet	137	1
38	40	40	Justin Allgaier (i)	JR Motorsports	Chevrolet	123	0
39	18	34	Todd Gilliland	Front Row Motorsports	Ford	123	1
40	21	48	Alex Bowman	Hendrick Motorsports	Chevrolet	123	3
41	38	78	B. J. McLeod	Live Fast Motorsports	Chevrolet	4	1
Official race results

=== Race statistics ===
- Lead changes: 66 among 26 different drivers
- Cautions/Laps: 5 for 32
- Red flags: 0
- Time of race: 3 hours, 23 minutes and 56 seconds
- Average speed: 147.107 miles per hour (236.746 km/h)

== Media ==
=== Television ===
Since 2001—with the exception of 2002, 2004 and 2006—the Daytona 500 has been carried by Fox in the United States. The booth crew consisted of longtime NASCAR lap-by-lap announcer Mike Joy, Clint Bowyer, and 2007 Daytona 500 winner Kevin Harvick. Jamie Little, Regan Smith, and Josh Sims handled pit road for the television side. 1992 and 1998 Daytona 500 winning crew chief Larry McReynolds provided insight on-site during the race.

Fox Television
Booth announcers	Pit reporters	In-race analyst
Lap-by-lap: Mike Joy; Color-commentator: Clint Bowyer; Color-commentator: Kevin Harvick	Jamie Little; Regan Smith; Josh Sims	Larry McReynolds

=== Radio ===
The race was broadcast on radio by the Motor Racing Network who have covered the Daytona 500 since 1970—and simulcast on Sirius XM NASCAR Radio. The booth crew consisted of Alex Hayden, Mike Bagley, and former championship crew chief Todd Gordon. Longtime turn announcer Dave Moody was the lead turn announcer, calling the race from atop the Sunoco tower outside the exit of turn 2 when the field races through turns 1 and 2. Kyle Rickey worked the backstretch for the race from a spotter's stand on the inside of the track & Tim Catalfamo called the race when the field races through turns 3 and 4 from the Sunoco tower outside the exit of turn 4. On pit road, MRN was operated by Lead MRN Pit Reporter Steve Post, Chris Wilner, and PRN Radio's Brad Gillie.

MRN Radio
Booth announcers	Turn announcers	Pit reporters
Lead announcer: Alex Hayden; Announcer: Mike Bagley; Announcer: Todd Gordon	Turns 1 & 2: Dave Moody; Backstretch: Kyle Rickey; Turns 3 & 4: Tim Catalfamo	Steve Post; Chris Wilner; Brad Gillie

== Standings after the race ==
Drivers' Championship standings

Pos	Driver	Points
1	Tyler Reddick	58
2	Joey Logano	46 (–12)
3	Chase Elliott	43 (–15)
4	Zane Smith	41 (–17)
5	Ricky Stenhouse Jr.	39 (–19)
6	Brad Keselowski	39 (–19)
7	Chris Buescher	39 (–19)
8	Bubba Wallace	37 (–21)
9	Ryan Blaney	36 (–22)
10	Riley Herbst	35 (–23)
11	Daniel Suárez	35 (–23)
12	Carson Hocevar	35 (–23)
13	Josh Berry	33 (–25)
14	Kyle Busch	29 (–29)
15	Kyle Larson	29 (–29)
16	Noah Gragson	27 (–31)
Official driver's standings

Manufacturers' Championship standings

Pos	Manufacturer	Points
1	Toyota	55
2	Chevrolet	35 (–20)
3	Ford	34 (–21)

- Note: Only the first 16 positions are included for the driver standings.

== See also ==
- 2026 United Rentals 300 (O'Reilly Auto Parts Series)
- 2026 Fresh From Florida 250 (Craftsman Truck Series)
- 2026 General Tire 200 (ARCA Menards Series)

Previous race: 2025 NASCAR Cup Series Championship Race (points); 2026 America 250 Florida Duel at Daytona (exhibition)	NASCAR Cup Series; 2026 season	Next race: 2026 Autotrader 400
