= 1975 Daytona 500 =

Auto race held at Daytona International Speedway in 1975

Race details
- Race 2 of 30 in the 1975 NASCAR Winston Cup Series
- 1975 Daytona 500 program cover
- Date: February 16, 1975
- Location: Daytona International Speedway; Daytona Beach, Florida, U.S.
- Course: Permanent racing facility 2.5 mi (4.023 km)
- Distance: 200 laps, 500 mi (804.672 km)
- Weather: Temperatures of 82.9 °F (28.3 °C); wind speeds of 13 miles per hour (21 km/h)
- Average speed: 153.649 miles per hour (247.274 km/h)

Pole position
Driver	Donnie Allison	DiGard Motorsports

Qualifying race winners
Duel 1 Winner	Bobby Allison	Penske Racing
Duel 2 Winner	David Pearson	Wood Brothers Racing

Most laps led
Driver	David Pearson	Wood Brothers Racing
- Laps: 74

Winner
No. 72	Benny Parsons	L.G. DeWitt

Television in the United States
- Network: ABC's Wide World of Sports
- Announcers: Bill Flemming; Jackie Stewart

The 1975 Daytona 500, the 17th running of the event on February 16, 1975, was a race in the NASCAR Winston Cup Series.

== Race report ==
From the start, it appeared that David Pearson was on his way to his first Daytona 500 victory as he built a sizable lead on second place Benny Parsons late in the race. However, Richard Petty, eight laps behind the leaders due to a leaking radiator which needed frequent pit stops to replenish, and Parsons hooked up in a draft and began reeling in Pearson who was slowed by lapped traffic. The key moment of the race occurred two laps from the end when contact with Cale Yarborough in traffic sent Pearson spinning on the backstretch. Parsons avoided the accident and went on to take the win.

One of the things that set up the late incident that cost David Pearson the race was that Cale Yarborough was running on 7 cylinders. On the final restart, Cale was placed in front of the leaders, on the end of the lead lap, but the power deficit he was at resulted in the leaders lapping him in less than 25 laps. When Pearson caught up to Yarborough and Richie Panch, Yarborough was trying to slip in behind Pearson and simply misjudged it. Of course, another was the role Richard Petty played. Even in a two-car draft with Ramo Stott (who barely missed the massive lap 4 crash), Parsons was losing ground to Pearson, who was content to draft A.J. Foyt, but Foyt dropped out with nine laps left while running third, not long after Petty got back onto the track after his final pit stop, and where he came out was a stroke of luck for Parsons and Stott, because he came out exactly where they were running.

As per the list below, 26 of the 40 drivers failed to finish the race for various reasons, including a huge crash on the fourth lap, which took out nine cars, nearly one-quarter of the field.

West Coast ace Hershel McGriff's third and final Daytona 500 ends with a blown motor on lap 13. Bruce Jacobi would debut in this race, finishing in 12th place after qualifying in 39th place.

Among those involved were famous country music singer Marty Robbins, who also crashed out of the 1973 Daytona 500.

At the time, it was the biggest crash in terms of the number of cars involved in race history. Donnie Allison started on the pole, but only led the first lap and was sidelined by mechanical problems, as was DiGard Racing teammate Johnny Rutherford, the reigning Indianapolis 500 champion. Another that failed to finish was Buddy Baker, who led 46 laps. As a result, a record-low 14 cars, including that of Pearson, were classified as running at the finish.

None of the 40 cars in this year's Daytona 500 had a single-digit car number.

== Race results ==
Pos	Grid	No.	Driver	Entrant	Manufacturer	Laps	Winnings	Laps led	Time/Status	Points
1	32	72	Benny Parsons	L. G. DeWitt	1975 Chevrolet	200	$43,905	4	3:15:15	180
2	3	16	Bobby Allison	Penske Racing	1975 Matador	199	$26,700	0	+1 Lap	170
3	6	11	Cale Yarborough	Junior Johnson & Associates	1975 Chevrolet	198	$21,850	6	+2 Laps	170
4	2	21	David Pearson	Wood Brothers Racing	1973 Mercury	198	$18,150	74	+2 Laps	170
5	31	83	Ramo Stott	Norris Reed	1975 Chevrolet	197	$11,650	0	+3 Laps	155
6	8	71	Dave Marcis	Nord Krauskopf	1974 Dodge	197	$13,650	0	+3 Laps	150
7	4	43	Richard Petty	Petty Enterprises	1974 Dodge	192	$13,700	51	+8 Laps	151
8	10	98	Richie Panch	Bettie Panch	1975 Chevrolet	191	$8,950	0	+9 Laps	142
9	37	49	G. C. Spencer	G. C. Spencer	1974 Dodge	191	$7,150	0	+9 Laps	138
10	17	48	James Hylton	James Hylton	1974 Chevrolet	189	$7,485	0	+11 Laps	134
11	9	28	A. J. Foyt	Hoss Ellington	1975 Chevrolet	188	$6,700	18	Engine	135
12	39	37	Bruce Jacobi	Opal Voight	1975 Chevrolet	185	$4,935	0	+15 Laps	127
13	30	97	Bob Burcham	Ed Clark	1973 Ford	184	$4,320	0	Axle	124
14	26	79	Ed Negre	Frank Warren	1974 Dodge	184	$4,390	0	+16 Laps	121
15	15	24	Cecil Gordon	Cecil Gordon	1975 Chevrolet	183	$4,195	0	Engine	118
16	16	82	Ferrel Harris	Ferrel Harris	1974 Dodge	176	$2,800	0	+24 Laps	115
17	35	14	Coo Coo Marlin	H. B. Cunningham	1975 Chevrolet	162	$3,105	0	Engine	112
18	36	96	Richard Childress	Tom Garn	1975 Chevrolet	150	$3,760	0	+50 Laps	109
19	7	54	Lennie Pond	Ronnie Elder	1975 Chevrolet	146	$3,250	0	Oil pump	106
20	13	15	Buddy Baker	Bud Moore Engineering	1973 Ford	144	$8,200	46	Timing chain	108
21	12	05	David Sisco	David Sisco	1975 Chevrolet	118	$2,925	0	Engine	100
22	5	90	Dick Brooks	Donlavey Racing	1973 Ford	104	$3,300	0	Water pump	97
23	24	64	Tommy Gale	Elmo Langley	1973 Ford	83	$2,625	0	Engine	94
24	40	33	George Follmer	Billy Moyer	1975 Chevrolet	67	$1,650	0	Suspension	91
25	22	30	Walter Ballard	Vic Ballard	1975 Chevrolet	67	$2,385	0	Ignition	88
26	33	17	Darrell Waltrip	Darrell Waltrip	1975 Chevrolet	54	$4,310	0	Axle	85
27	11	08	Johnny Rutherford	DiGard Racing	1975 Chevrolet	51	$2,075	0	Engine	82
28	1	88	Donnie Allison	DiGard Racing	1975 Chevrolet	36	$6,365	1	Fuel pump	84
29	18	74	Randy Tissot	Charles Little	1975 Chevrolet	30	$1,860	0	Engine	76
30	38	69	Hershel McGriff	Ken Friez	1975 Chevrolet	13	$1,400	0	Engine	73
31	21	20	Rick Newsom	Rick Newsom	1973 Ford	7	$1,760	0	Engine	70
32	20	47	Bruce Hill	Bruce Hill	1975 Chevrolet	4	$1,750	0	Crash	67
33	14	70	J. D. McDuffie	McDuffie Racing	1975 Chevrolet	3	$2,355	0	Crash	64
34	19	60	Joe Mihalic	Lou Viglione	1975 Chevrolet	3	$1,700	0	Crash	61
35	24	99	Jim Vandiver	John Keselowski	1974 Dodge	3	$1,350	0	Crash	58
36	27	75	Dick Trickle	Delbert Puro	1973 Mercury	3	$1,705	0	Crash	55
37	25	41	Grant Adcox	Herb Adcox	1975 Chevrolet	3	$1,615	0	Crash	52
38	23	35	Dan Daughtry	Morris Davis	1973 Ford	3	$1,550	0	Crash	49
39	28	42	Marty Robbins	Marty Robbins	1974 Dodge	3	$1,705	0	Crash	46
40	29	81	Warren Tope	Warren Tope	1973 Ford	3	$1,470	0	Crash	43

== Standings after the race ==
Pos	Driver	Points	Differential
1	Bobby Allison	355	0
2	David Pearson	345	-10
3	Dave Marcis	310	-45
4	Richard Petty	302	-53
5	James Hylton	284	-71
6	Cecil Gordon	283	-72
7	Benny Parsons	271	-84
8	Ed Negre	259	-96
9	Richard Childress	239	-116
10	Hershel McGriff	207	-148
