= Joe Mihalic =

American racing driver (1926–2022)

- Born: Joseph Mihalic; November 8, 1926; Turtle Creek, Pennsylvania, U.S.
- Died: February 2022 (aged 95)

NASCAR Cup Series career
- 38 races run over 5 years
- Best finish: 34th (1975)
- First race: 1974 Daytona 500 (Daytona)
- Last race: 1978 Coca-Cola 500 (Pocono)
Wins	Top tens	Poles
0	2	0
- Statistics up to date as of November 4, 2024.

Joseph Mihalic (November 8, 1926 – February 2022) was an American professional stock car racing driver who competed in the NASCAR Winston Cup Series, where he earned two top-ten finishes with a best finish of seventh at Bristol Motor Speedway in 1974.

Mihalic was born in Turtle Creek, Pennsylvania on November 8, 1926. He also competed in the National Dirt Racing Association. He died in February 2022, at the age of 95.

== Motorsports career results ==
=== NASCAR ===
(key) (Bold - Pole position awarded by qualifying time. Italics - Pole position earned by points standings or practice time. * – Most laps led.)

==== Winston Cup Series ====
NASCAR Winston Cup Series results
Year	Team	No.	Make	1	2	3	4	5	6	7	8	9	10	11	12	13	14	15	16	17	18	19	20	21	22	23	24	25	26	27	28	29	30	31	NWCC	Pts	Ref
1974	Lou Viglione	60	Chevy	RSD	DAY; 37	RCH	CAR; 17	BRI; 7	ATL	DAR	NWS	MAR	TAL	NSV	DOV	CLT	RSD	MCH	DAY	BRI	NSV	ATL	POC	TAL	MCH	DAR	RCH	DOV; 23	NWS	MAR	CLT	CAR; 16	ONT		53rd	17.625	
1975	Lou Viglione	60	Chevy	RSD	DAY; 34	RCH	CAR	BRI	ATL; 33	NWS; 14	DAR; 13	MAR	TAL; 9	NSV	DOV	CLT	RSD	MCH																	34th	957	
1975	Lou Viglione	61	Chevy																DAY; 27	NSV	POC; 21	TAL; 26	MCH	DAR; DNQ	DOV; 32	NWS	MAR; 16	CLT	RCH	CAR	BRI	ATL	ONT		34th	957	
1976	Lou Viglione	61	Chevy	RSD	DAY; 17	CAR	RCH; 12	BRI; 26	ATL; DNQ	NWS	DAR	MAR	TAL	NSV	DOV; 18	CLT	RSD	MCH	DAY; 23	NSV	POC; 13	TAL; 13	MCH; 22	BRI	DAR	RCH	DOV; 18	MAR	NWS	CLT	CAR	ATL	ONT		35th	981	
1977	Joe Mihalic	61	Chevy	RSD	DAY; DNQ	RCH	CAR; 29	ATL	NWS	DAR; 25	BRI	MAR	TAL	NSV	DOV	CLT	RSD	MCH	DAY	NSV	POC; 18	TAL; 32	MCH; 24	BRI	DAR; 40	RCH	DOV; 18	MAR	NWS	CLT	CAR; 21	ATL	ONT		41st	683	
1978	Jim Norris	61	Olds	RSD	DAY; 31	RCH	CAR; 19	ATL							CLT; DNQ	NSV	RSD	MCH	DAY	NSV															47th	419	
1978	Jim Norris	61	Chevy						BRI; 24	DAR; 26	NWS	MAR	TAL	DOV; 30							POC; 32	TAL	MCH	BRI	DAR	RCH	DOV	MAR	NWS	CLT	CAR	ATL	ONT		47th	419	
1979	J. M. Norris	61	Olds	RSD	DAY; Wth	CAR	RCH	ATL	NWS	BRI	DAR	MAR	TAL	NSV	DOV	CLT	TWS	RSD	MCH	DAY	NSV	POC	TAL	MCH	BRI	DAR	RCH	DOV	MAR	CLT	NWS	CAR	ATL	ONT	N/A	0	

===== Daytona 500 =====
Year	Team	Manufacturer	Start	Finish
1974	Lou Viglione	Chevrolet	25	37
1975	Lou Viglione	Chevrolet	19	34
1976	Lou Viglione	Chevrolet	21	17
1977	Joe Mihalic	Chevrolet	DNQ	
1978	Jim Norris	Oldsmobile	21	31
1979	J. M. Norris	Oldsmobile	Wth	
