= 1977 Daytona 500 =

Auto race run in Florida in 1977

Race details
- Race 2 of 30 in the 1977 NASCAR Winston Cup Series
- 1977 Daytona 500 program cover
- Date: February 20, 1977
- Location: Daytona International Speedway; Daytona Beach, Florida, U.S.
- Course: Permanent racing facility 2.5 mi (4.023 km)
- Distance: 200 laps, 500 mi (804.672 km)
- Weather: Temperatures of 73.9 °F (23.3 °C); wind speeds up to 24.1 miles per hour (38.8 km/h)
- Average speed: 153.218 miles per hour (246.580 km/h)

Pole position
Driver	Donnie Allison	Ellington Racing

Qualifying race winners
Duel 1 Winner	Richard Petty	Petty Enterprises
Duel 2 Winner	Cale Yarborough	Junior Johnson & Associates

Most laps led
Driver	Cale Yarborough	Junior Johnson & Associates
- Laps: 137

Winner
No. 11	Cale Yarborough	Junior Johnson & Associates

Television in the United States
- Network: ABC's WWOS
- Announcers: Jim McKay; Jackie Stewart; Chris Economaki
- Nielsen ratings: 12.9/35 (16.0 million viewers)

The 1977 Daytona 500, the 19th running of the event, was held on February 20, 1977, as the second race of the 1977 NASCAR Winston Cup Series Season.

First Daytona 500 starts for Janet Guthrie, Ricky Rudd, Ron Hutcherson, Elliott Forbes-Robinson and Bobby Wawak. Only Daytona 500 start for Sam Sommers. Last Daytona 500 starts for Bob Burcham, Terry Ryan, Walter Ballard, Salt Walther, Ramo Stott, Ed Negre, and Jim Hurtubise.

== Summary ==
Cale Yarborough won his second Daytona 500 and it would lead to his second straight Winston Cup title, and Donnie Allison won his second pole position for this event. Janet Guthrie made history at this race as the first female NASCAR Cup Series driver; getting a 12th place finish in the process.

Bobby Wawak bailed out of his car while it was still moving and on fire on lap 3. Seconds later the car slammed the inside wall by the entrance to pit road. Wawak got 15% burns on his body on his face which was second degree, first degree on his hands and one of his legs and was taken to hospital. Chris Economaki who was reporting in the pits for ABC Sports said "The doctors told him if he had fire retardant underwear on (Gloves, socks and a balaclava) he would not be injured at all". Three Time Formula One World Champion Jackie Stewart who was commentating on the race for ABC Sports said "The drivers themselves are negligent, drivers should always wear flame resistant underwear and thermal underwear. The accident we seen today is just typical if your not properly protected".

The race resulted in the first Top 10 finish for Jimmy Means, the final Top 10 finish for Bob Burcham, and the last Top 5 finish for the late Coo Coo Marlin.

Jim Vandiver retired from the NASCAR Winston Cup Series after this race. Richard Petty started the race 7/8 from pit lane in last place. He caught a break with the caution for Wawak's fire then worked his way through the field back into contention only to later blow the engine and drop out. Donnie Allison blew a tire at the start/finish line on lap 88, and was forced to limp into the pits, where his team discovered too much damage had been done, so they pulled the car out of the race.

Defending Daytona 500 David Pearson also had mechanical issues. The Silver Fox led two laps but like Petty, his #21 Purolator Mercury was sidelined with a blown engine before the 3/4 mark. USAC Champ Car racer Salt Walther's last NASCAR Cup start ended in a backstretch crash. A gust of wind caught Walther's self-owned #4 Chevrolet and caused him to lose it triggering a three-car incident that also included Buddy Baker and Dave Marcis. Baker recovered to finish third but Salt was done for the day.

Once Petty and Pearson were gone the race came down to a battle between Cale Yarborough and Benny Parsons that saw Yarborough eventually prevail.

== Race results ==
Pos	Grid	No.	Driver	Entrant	Manufacturer	Laps	Winnings	Laps led	Time/Status	Points
1	4	11	Cale Yarborough	Junior Johnson & Associates	Chevrolet	200	$63,700	137	3:15:48	185
2	6	72	Benny Parsons	L. G. DeWitt	Chevrolet	200	$38,825	16	+1.39	175
3	8	15	Buddy Baker	Bud Moore Engineering	Ford	199	$28,075	16	+1 Lap	170
4	13	14	Coo Coo Marlin	H. B. Cunningham	Chevrolet	198	$17,825	0	+2 Laps	160
5	15	90	Dick Brooks	Donlavey Racing	Ford	198	$18,100	0	+2 Laps	155
6	2	51	A. J. Foyt	A. J. Foyt Enterprises	Chevrolet	197	$13,800	13	+3 Laps	–
7	10	88	Darrell Waltrip	DiGard Racing	Chevrolet	193	$15,745	4	+7 Laps	151
8	23	52	Jimmy Means	Bill Gray	Chevrolet	192	$10,985	0	+8 Laps	142
9	30	19	Bob Burcham	Henley Gray	Chevrolet	191	$12,475	0	+9 Laps	138
10	37	48	James Hylton	James Hylton	Chevrolet	189	$11,090	0	+11 Laps	134
11	33	79	Frank Warren	Frank Warren	Dodge	188	$8,920	1	+12 Laps	135
12	39	68	Janet Guthrie	Lynda Ferreri	Chevrolet	188	$7,390	0	+12 Laps	127
13	24	70	J. D. McDuffie	McDuffie Racing	Chevrolet	184	$8,115	0	Engine	124
14	42	40	D. K. Ulrich	J. R. DeLotto	Chevrolet	168	$7,210	0	+32 Laps	121
15	7	12	Bobby Allison	Bobby Allison Motorsports	Matador	167	$6,560	0	Engine	118
16	35	30	Tighe Scott	Walter Ballard	Chevrolet	166	$6,285	0	Engine	115
17	41	24	Cecil Gordon	Gordon Racing	Chevrolet	164	$5,615	0	+36 Laps	112
18	34	81	Terry Ryan	Bill Monaghan	Chevrolet	159	$3,885	0	Engine	109
19	29	03	Walter Ballard	Walter Ballard	Chevrolet	153	$3,700	0	Engine	106
20	19	31	Jim Vandiver	Ranier Racing	Dodge	137	$3,520	0	+63 Laps	103
21	5	21	David Pearson	Wood Brothers Racing	Mercury	135	$5,440	2	Engine	105
22	21	22	Ricky Rudd	Al Rudd	Chevrolet	135	$2,935	0	Rear end	97
23	32	3	Richard Childress	Richard Childress Racing	Chevrolet	127	$3,290	0	+73 Laps	94
24	25	4	Salt Walther	Salt Walther	Chevrolet	114	$2,725	0	Crash	–
25	18	47	Bruce Hill	Bruce Hill	Chevrolet	113	$2,750	0	Engine	88
26	3	43	Richard Petty	Petty Enterprises	Dodge	111	$9,550	4	Engine	90
27	12	60	Ramo Stott	Lou Viglione	Chevrolet	107	$2,450	0	Crash	82
28	9	2	Dave Marcis	Penske Racing	Mercury	103	$6,150	1	+97 Laps	84
29	22	8	Ed Negre	Ed Negre	Dodge	101	$3,175	0	Engine	76
30	1	1	Donnie Allison	Hoss Ellington	Chevrolet	88	$7,575	6	Crash	78
31	36	27	Sam Sommers	M. C. Anderson	Chevrolet	87	$1,350	0	Water pump	70
32	31	83	Ron Hutcherson	Norris Reed	Chevrolet	85	$4,525	0	Transmission	67
33	20	26	Jimmy Lee Capps	David Lee Sellers	Chevrolet	77	$2,175	0	Rear end	64
34	14	41	Grant Adcox	Herb Adcox	Chevrolet	73	$2,325	0	Engine	61
35	26	95	Jim Hurtubise	Junior Miller	Chevrolet	69	$2,050	0	Oil cooler	58
36	27	92	Skip Manning	Billy Hagan	Chevrolet	65	$2,615	0	Engine	55
37	11	71	Neil Bonnett	Nord Krauskopf	Dodge	65	$5,525	0	Engine	52
38	38	67	Buddy Arrington	Buddy Arrington	Dodge	51	$1,780	0	Engine	49
39	28	29	Roy Smith	Dick Midgley	Chevrolet	45	$2,020	0	Engine	46
40	16	87	Elliott Forbes-Robinson	Ferrel Harris	Dodge	44	$2,025	0	Engine	43
41	40	77	Johnny Rutherford	Johnny Ray	Chevrolet	29	$1,725	0	Vibration	–
42	17	32	Bobby Wawak	John Gwinn	Chevrolet	3	$2,400	0	Fire	37

== Media ==
=== Television ===
The Daytona 500 was covered by ABC for the sixteenth time. ABC only aired reports during the early stages of the race, live coverage started at 3:00pm - about two thirds of the way into the race. Live coverage continued until after the finish. Jim McKay and three time Formula One World Champion Jackie Stewart called the race from the broadcast booth. Chris Economaki handled pit road for the television side.

ABC
Booth announcers		Pit reporters
Lap-by-lap	Color-commentators	Pit reporters
Jim McKay	Jackie Stewart	Chris Economaki
