= 1987 Daytona 500 =

First race of the 1987 NASCAR Winston Cup Series

Race details
- Race 1 of 29 in the 1987 NASCAR Winston Cup Series
- The 1987 Daytona 500 program cover, featuring Geoff Bodine.
- Date: February 15, 1987
- Official name: 29th Annual Daytona 500
- Location: Daytona Beach, Florida, Daytona International Speedway
- Course: Permanent racing facility
- Course length: 2.5 miles (4.0 km)
- Distance: 200 laps, 500 mi (804.672 km)
- Average speed: 137.531 miles per hour (221.335 km/h)
- Attendance: 130,000

Pole position
| Driver | Bill Elliott | Melling Racing |
- Time: 42.783

Most laps led
| Driver | Bill Elliott | Melling Racing |
- Laps: 104

Winner
| No. 9 | Bill Elliott | Melling Racing |

Television in the United States
- Network: CBS
- Announcers: Ken Squier, Ned Jarrett, David Hobbs, Chris Economaki,

Radio in the United States
- Radio: Motor Racing Network

The 1987 Daytona 500 was the first stock car race of the 1987 NASCAR Winston Cup Series season and the 29th iteration of the event. The race was held on Sunday, February 15, 1987, before an audience of 130,000 in Daytona Beach, Florida at Daytona International Speedway, a 2.5 miles (4.0 km) permanent triangular-shaped superspeedway. The race took the scheduled 200 laps to complete.

Nearing the race's end, Hendrick Motorsports' Geoff Bodine tried to forego a final pitstop but ran out of fuel with three laps to go. Melling Racing's Bill Elliott took the lead and held off Bodine's teammate, Benny Parsons, and owner-driver Richard Petty to take his 18th career NASCAR Winston Cup Series victory, his first victory of the season, and his second and final Daytona 500 victory.

== Background ==
The layout of Daytona International Speedway, the venue where the race was held.

Daytona International Speedway is one of three superspeedways to hold NASCAR races, the other two being Indianapolis Motor Speedway and Talladega Superspeedway. The standard track at Daytona International Speedway is a four-turn superspeedway that is 2.5 miles (4.0 km) long. The track's turns are banked at 31 degrees, while the front stretch, the location of the finish line, is banked at 18 degrees.

=== Entry list ===
- (R) denotes rookie driver.

| # | Driver | Team | Make | Sponsor |
|---|---|---|---|---|
| 00 | Dick McCabe | McCabe Racing | Chevrolet | McCabe Racing |
| 1 | Ron Bouchard | Ellington Racing | Chevrolet | Bull's-Eye Barbecue Sauce |
| 02 | Joe Booher | Booher Racing | Pontiac | Booher Racing |
| 3 | Dale Earnhardt | Richard Childress Racing | Chevrolet | Wrangler |
| 4 | Rick Wilson | Morgan–McClure Motorsports | Oldsmobile | Kodak |
| 5 | Geoff Bodine | Hendrick Motorsports | Chevrolet | Levi Garrett |
| 6 | Trevor Boys | U.S. Racing | Chevrolet | U.S. Racing |
| 7 | Alan Kulwicki | AK Racing | Ford | Zerex |
| 8 | Bobby Hillin Jr. | Stavola Brothers Racing | Buick | Miller American |
| 9 | Bill Elliott | Melling Racing | Ford | Coors |
| 09 | Jeff Swindell | Swindell Racing | Chevrolet | Swindell Racing |
| 10 | Rodney Combs (R) | DiGard Motorsports | Oldsmobile | Oberg Filters |
| 11 | Terry Labonte | Junior Johnson & Associates | Chevrolet | Budweiser |
| 12 | David Sosebee | Hamby Racing | Chevrolet | Hamby Racing |
| 14 | A. J. Foyt | A. J. Foyt Racing | Oldsmobile | Copenhagen |
| 15 | Ricky Rudd | Bud Moore Engineering | Ford | Motorcraft Quality Parts |
| 17 | Darrell Waltrip | Hendrick Motorsports | Chevrolet | Tide |
| 18 | Tommy Ellis | Freedlander Motorsports | Chevrolet | Freedlander Financial |
| 19 | Derrike Cope (R) | Stoke Racing | Ford | Stoke Racing |
| 21 | Kyle Petty | Wood Brothers Racing | Ford | Citgo |
| 22 | Bobby Allison | Stavola Brothers Racing | Buick | Miller American |
| 24 | Grant Adcox | Adcox Racing | Chevrolet | Herb Adcox Chevrolet |
| 26 | Morgan Shepherd | King Racing | Buick | Quaker State |
| 27 | Rusty Wallace | Blue Max Racing | Pontiac | Kodiak |
| 28 | Davey Allison (R) | Ranier-Lundy Racing | Ford | Ranier-Lundy Racing |
| 29 | Cale Yarborough | Cale Yarborough Motorsports | Oldsmobile | Hardee's |
| 30 | Michael Waltrip | Bahari Racing | Chevrolet | Oxford Plains Speedway, Domino's |
| 32 | Jonathan Lee Edwards | Edwards Racing | Chevrolet | Edwards Racing |
| 33 | Harry Gant | Mach 1 Racing | Chevrolet | Skoal Bandit |
| 35 | Benny Parsons | Hendrick Motorsports | Chevrolet | Folgers |
| 39 | Blackie Wangerin | Wangerin Racing | Ford | Wangerin Racing |
| 41 | Ronnie Thomas | Ronnie Thomas Racing | Pontiac | Busch Cleaners |
| 43 | Richard Petty | Petty Enterprises | Pontiac | STP |
| 44 | Sterling Marlin | Hagan Racing | Oldsmobile | Piedmont Airlines |
| 48 | Steve Moore | Hylton Motorsports | Chevrolet | Hylton Motorsports |
| 49 | Delma Cowart | H. L. Waters Racing | Chevrolet | H. L. Waters Racing |
| 50 | Greg Sacks | Dingman Brothers Racing | Pontiac | Valvoline |
| 51 | David Simko | Simko Racing | Chevrolet | Mount Steel & Supply, The Tom Company |
| 52 | Jimmy Means | Jimmy Means Racing | Pontiac | Turtle Wax |
| 54 | Donnie Allison | Gray Racing | Chevrolet | Jerzees |
| 55 | Phil Parsons | Jackson Bros. Motorsports | Oldsmobile | Copenhagen |
| 62 | Steve Christman (R) | Winkle Motorsports | Pontiac | AC Spark Plug |
| 63 | Jocko Maggiacomo (Note: Maggiacomo suffered a crash during a Wednesday, February 11 practice session. As the team had no backup car, the team withdrew.) | Linro Motorsports | Chevrolet | Linro Motorsports |
| 64 | Connie Saylor | Langley Racing | Ford | Sunny King Ford |
| 66 | Tom Sneva | Jackson Bros. Motorsports | Oldsmobile | Skoal |
| 67 | Eddie Bierschwale | Arrington Racing | Ford | Jim Peacock Ford, Pannill Sweatshirts |
| 70 | J. D. McDuffie | McDuffie Racing | Pontiac | Winkle Pontiac |
| 71 | Dave Marcis | Marcis Auto Racing | Chevrolet | Lifebuoy |
| 73 | Phil Barkdoll | Barkdoll Racing | Oldsmobile | Barkdoll Racing |
| 74 | Bobby Wawak | Wawak Racing | Chevrolet | Wawak Racing |
| 75 | Neil Bonnett | RahMoc Enterprises | Pontiac | Valvoline |
| 77 | Ken Ragan | Ragan Racing | Ford | Southlake Ford |
| 81 | Chet Fillip | Fillip Racing | Ford | Marshall Batteries |
| 82 | Mark Stahl | Stahl Racing | Ford | Auto Bell Car Wash |
| 83 | Lake Speed | Speed Racing | Oldsmobile | Wynn's, Kmart |
| 86 | Ronnie Sanders | Moss Racing | Ford | Moss Racing |
| 88 | Buddy Baker | Baker–Schiff Racing | Oldsmobile | Crisco |
| 89 | Jim Sauter | Mueller Brothers Racing | Pontiac | Evinrude Outboard Motors |
| 90 | Ken Schrader | Donlavey Racing | Ford | Red Baron Frozen Pizza |
| 92 | Ralph Jones | LC Racing | Ford | Country Boy Waterbeds, K. T. B. Custom Photo Lab |
| 93 | Charlie Baker | Salmon Racing | Chevrolet | Salmon Racing |
| 98 | Ed Pimm | Curb Racing | Oldsmobile | Sunoco |

== Qualifying ==
Qualifying was set by the 1987 7-Eleven Twin 125s. The top two positions were set by qualifying speeds held for the Twin 125 Qualifiers held on Monday, February 9, with the top two qualifiers in the session earning the top two positions for the Daytona 500. The rest of the starting was set in the Twin 125 Qualifiers, held on Thursday, February 12, during two races. The top 14 finishers in the first race, excluding the pole position winner, set the inside row from rows two to 15, and the top 14 finishers in the second race, excluding the outside pole position winner, set the outside row from rows two to 15. The remaining non-qualifiers set positions 31-40 based on qualifying speeds from the first qualifying session held on Saturday. If needed, up to two extra provisionals were given to teams high enough in the previous season's owner's standings that did not qualify for the race by either qualifying speed or from the Twin 125 Qualifiers.

Bill Elliott, driving for Melling Racing, managed to win the pole, setting a time of 42.783 and an average speed of 210.364 miles per hour (338.548 km/h) in Monday's session.

19 drivers failed to qualify.

=== Full qualifying results ===
| Pos. | # | Driver | Team | Make | Reason |
|---|---|---|---|---|---|
| 1 | 9 | Bill Elliott | Melling Racing | Ford | Qualified on pole |
| 2 | 28 | Davey Allison (R) | Ranier-Lundy Racing | Ford | Qualified on outside pole |
| 3 | 90 | Ken Schrader | Donlavey Racing | Ford | First in Twin 125 #1 |
| 4 | 35 | Benny Parsons | Hendrick Motorsports | Chevrolet | First in Twin 125 #2 |
| 5 | 17 | Darrell Waltrip | Hendrick Motorsports | Chevrolet | Third in Twin 125 #1 |
| 6 | 22 | Bobby Allison | Stavola Brothers Racing | Buick | Second in Twin 125 #2 |
| 7 | 88 | Buddy Baker | Baker–Schiff Racing | Oldsmobile | Fourth in Twin 125 #1 |
| 8 | 5 | Geoff Bodine | Hendrick Motorsports | Chevrolet | Third in Twin 125 #2 |
| 9 | 4 | Rick Wilson | Morgan–McClure Motorsports | Oldsmobile | Fifth in Twin 125 #1 |
| 10 | 44 | Sterling Marlin | Hagan Racing | Oldsmobile | Fourth in Twin 125 #2 |
| 11 | 43 | Richard Petty | Petty Enterprises | Pontiac | Sixth in Twin 125 #1 |
| 12 | 33 | Harry Gant | Mach 1 Racing | Chevrolet | Fifth in Twin 125 #2 |
| 13 | 3 | Dale Earnhardt | Richard Childress Racing | Chevrolet | Seventh in Twin 125 #1 |
| 14 | 11 | Terry Labonte | Junior Johnson & Associates | Chevrolet | Seventh in Twin 125 #2 |
| 15 | 75 | Neil Bonnett | RahMoc Enterprises | Pontiac | Eighth in Twin 125 #1 |
| 16 | 71 | Dave Marcis | Marcis Auto Racing | Chevrolet | Eighth in Twin 125 #2 |
| 17 | 1 | Ron Bouchard | Ellington Racing | Chevrolet | Ninth in Twin 125 #1 |
| 18 | 30 | Michael Waltrip | Bahari Racing | Chevrolet | Ninth in Twin 125 #2 |
| 19 | 55 | Phil Parsons | Jackson Bros. Motorsports | Oldsmobile | Tenth in Twin 125 #1 |
| 20 | 21 | Kyle Petty | Wood Brothers Racing | Ford | Tenth in Twin 125 #2 |
| 21 | 8 | Bobby Hillin Jr. | Stavola Brothers Racing | Buick | 11th in Twin 125 #1 |
| 22 | 29 | Cale Yarborough | Cale Yarborough Motorsports | Oldsmobile | 11th in Twin 125 #2 |
| 23 | 19 | Derrike Cope (R) | Stoke Racing | Ford | 12th in Twin 125 #1 |
| 24 | 77 | Ken Ragan | Ragan Racing | Ford | 12th in Twin 125 #2 |
| 25 | 64 | Connie Saylor | Langley Racing | Ford | 13th in Twin 125 #1 |
| 26 | 81 | Chet Fillip | Fillip Racing | Ford | 13th in Twin 125 #2 |
| 27 | 86 | Ronnie Sanders | Moss Racing | Ford | 14th in Twin 125 #1 |
| 28 | 6 | Trevor Boys | U.S. Racing | Chevrolet | 14th in Twin 125 #2 |
| 29 | 66 | Tom Sneva | Jackson Bros. Motorsports | Oldsmobile | 15th in Twin 125 #1 |
| 30 | 82 | Mark Stahl | Stahl Racing | Ford | 15th in Twin 125 #2 |
| 31 | 15 | Ricky Rudd | Bud Moore Engineering | Ford | Speed provisional (204.634) |
| 32 | 27 | Rusty Wallace | Blue Max Racing | Pontiac | Speed provisional (204.448) |
| 33 | 83 | Lake Speed | Speed Racing | Oldsmobile | Speed provisional (204.160) |
| 34 | 67 | Eddie Bierschwale | Arrington Racing | Ford | Speed provisional (203.087) |
| 35 | 26 | Morgan Shepherd | King Racing | Buick | Speed provisional (202.789) |
| 36 | 10 | Rodney Combs (R) | DiGard Motorsports | Oldsmobile | Speed provisional (202.425) |
| 37 | 7 | Alan Kulwicki | AK Racing | Ford | Speed provisional (201.771) |
| 38 | 70 | J. D. McDuffie | McDuffie Racing | Pontiac | Speed provisional (200.929) |
| 39 | 12 | David Sosebee | Hamby Racing | Chevrolet | Owner's points provisional |
| 40 | 52 | Jimmy Means | Jimmy Means Racing | Pontiac | Owner's points provisional |
Forced to start at rear
| 41 | 14 | A. J. Foyt | A. J. Foyt Racing | Oldsmobile | Speed provisional (203.832) |
| 42 | 50 | Greg Sacks | Dingman Brothers Racing | Pontiac | Speed provisional (201.428) |
Failed to qualify or withdrew
| 43 | 74 | Bobby Wawak | Wawak Racing | Chevrolet | 16th in Twin 125 #1 |
| 44 | 51 | David Simko | Simko Racing | Chevrolet | 19th in Twin 125 #2 |
| 45 | 02 | Joe Booher | Booher Racing | Pontiac | 19th in Twin 125 #1 |
| 46 | 92 | Ralph Jones | LC Racing | Ford | 20th in Twin 125 #2 |
| 47 | 93 | Charlie Baker | Salmon Racing | Chevrolet | 20th in Twin 125 #1 |
| 48 | 39 | Blackie Wangerin | Wangerin Racing | Ford | 21st in Twin 125 #2 |
| 49 | 24 | Grant Adcox | Adcox Racing | Chevrolet | 22nd in Twin 125 #1 |
| 50 | 62 | Steve Christman (R) | Winkle Motorsports | Pontiac | 23rd in Twin 125 #2 |
| 51 | 32 | Jonathan Lee Edwards | Edwards Racing | Chevrolet | 23rd in Twin 125 #1 |
| 52 | 49 | Delma Cowart | H. L. Waters Racing | Chevrolet | 24th in Twin 125 #2 |
| 53 | 89 | Jim Sauter | Mueller Brothers Racing | Pontiac | 25th in Twin 125 #1 |
| 54 | 09 | Jeff Swindell | Swindell Racing | Chevrolet | 25th in Twin 125 #2 |
| 55 | 18 | Tommy Ellis | Freedlander Motorsports | Chevrolet | 27th in Twin 125 #1 |
| 56 | 98 | Ed Pimm | Curb Racing | Oldsmobile | 27th in Twin 125 #2 |
| 57 | 48 | Steve Moore | Hylton Motorsports | Chevrolet | 28th in Twin 125 #1 |
| 58 | 41 | Ronnie Thomas | Ronnie Thomas Racing | Pontiac | 29th in Twin 125 #2 |
| 59 | 73 | Phil Barkdoll | Barkdoll Racing | Oldsmobile | 30th in Twin 125 #1 |
| 60 | 54 | Donnie Allison | Gray Racing | Chevrolet | 30th in Twin 125 #2 |
| 61 | 00 | Dick McCabe | McCabe Racing | Chevrolet | 31st in Twin 125 #2 |
| WD | 63 | Jocko Maggiacomo | Linro Motorsports | Chevrolet | Injuries sustained in a practice crash |
Official Twin 125s results
Official starting lineup

== Race results ==
| Fin | St | # | Driver | Team | Make | Laps | Led | Status | Pts | Winnings |
|---|---|---|---|---|---|---|---|---|---|---|
| 1 | 1 | 9 | Bill Elliott | Melling Racing | Ford | 200 | 104 | running | 185 | $204,150 |
| 2 | 4 | 35 | Benny Parsons | Hendrick Motorsports | Chevrolet | 200 | 2 | running | 175 | $122,420 |
| 3 | 11 | 43 | Richard Petty | Petty Enterprises | Pontiac | 200 | 2 | running | 170 | $76,040 |
| 4 | 7 | 88 | Buddy Baker | Baker–Schiff Racing | Oldsmobile | 200 | 45 | running | 165 | $74,450 |
| 5 | 13 | 3 | Dale Earnhardt | Richard Childress Racing | Chevrolet | 200 | 16 | running | 160 | $64,925 |
| 6 | 6 | 22 | Bobby Allison | Stavola Brothers Racing | Buick | 200 | 0 | running | 150 | $60,475 |
| 7 | 3 | 90 | Ken Schrader | Donlavey Racing | Ford | 200 | 14 | running | 151 | $68,545 |
| 8 | 5 | 17 | Darrell Waltrip | Hendrick Motorsports | Chevrolet | 200 | 1 | running | 147 | $39,925 |
| 9 | 31 | 15 | Ricky Rudd | Bud Moore Engineering | Ford | 200 | 0 | running | 138 | $38,425 |
| 10 | 22 | 29 | Cale Yarborough | Cale Yarborough Motorsports | Oldsmobile | 200 | 0 | running | 134 | $29,600 |
| 11 | 19 | 55 | Phil Parsons | Jackson Bros. Motorsports | Oldsmobile | 200 | 0 | running | 130 | $26,200 |
| 12 | 15 | 75 | Neil Bonnett | RahMoc Enterprises | Pontiac | 199 | 5 | running | 132 | $29,600 |
| 13 | 21 | 8 | Bobby Hillin Jr. | Stavola Brothers Racing | Buick | 199 | 0 | running | 124 | $29,005 |
| 14 | 8 | 5 | Geoff Bodine | Hendrick Motorsports | Chevrolet | 199 | 10 | running | 126 | $36,365 |
| 15 | 37 | 7 | Alan Kulwicki | AK Racing | Ford | 198 | 0 | running | 118 | $22,740 |
| 16 | 35 | 26 | Morgan Shepherd | King Racing | Buick | 198 | 0 | running | 115 | $20,660 |
| 17 | 24 | 77 | Ken Ragan | Ragan Racing | Ford | 197 | 0 | running | 112 | $17,085 |
| 18 | 14 | 11 | Terry Labonte | Junior Johnson & Associates | Chevrolet | 197 | 0 | running | 109 | $25,915 |
| 19 | 36 | 10 | Rodney Combs (R) | DiGard Motorsports | Oldsmobile | 197 | 0 | running | 106 | $15,295 |
| 20 | 42 | 50 | Greg Sacks | Dingman Brothers Racing | Pontiac | 196 | 0 | running | 103 | $14,335 |
| 21 | 27 | 86 | Ronnie Sanders | Moss Racing | Ford | 195 | 0 | running | 0 | $13,930 |
| 22 | 18 | 30 | Michael Waltrip | Bahari Racing | Chevrolet | 193 | 0 | running | 97 | $18,110 |
| 23 | 28 | 6 | Trevor Boys | U.S. Racing | Chevrolet | 191 | 0 | running | 94 | $16,795 |
| 24 | 40 | 52 | Jimmy Means | Jimmy Means Racing | Pontiac | 191 | 0 | running | 91 | $14,480 |
| 25 | 38 | 70 | J. D. McDuffie | McDuffie Racing | Pontiac | 191 | 0 | running | 88 | $11,810 |
| 26 | 33 | 83 | Lake Speed | Speed Racing | Oldsmobile | 188 | 0 | engine | 85 | $11,105 |
| 27 | 2 | 28 | Davey Allison (R) | Ranier-Lundy Racing | Ford | 184 | 0 | running | 82 | $14,045 |
| 28 | 39 | 12 | David Sosebee | Hamby Racing | Chevrolet | 184 | 0 | running | 79 | $14,145 |
| 29 | 29 | 66 | Tom Sneva | Jackson Bros. Motorsports | Oldsmobile | 182 | 0 | engine | 76 | $11,135 |
| 30 | 10 | 44 | Sterling Marlin | Hagan Racing | Oldsmobile | 167 | 1 | clutch | 78 | $16,875 |
| 31 | 12 | 33 | Harry Gant | Mach 1 Racing | Chevrolet | 156 | 0 | transmission | 70 | $15,100 |
| 32 | 17 | 1 | Ron Bouchard | Ellington Racing | Chevrolet | 125 | 0 | engine | 67 | $11,370 |
| 33 | 23 | 19 | Derrike Cope (R) | Stoke Racing | Ford | 124 | 0 | overheating | 64 | $10,840 |
| 34 | 16 | 71 | Dave Marcis | Marcis Auto Racing | Chevrolet | 115 | 0 | oil leak | 61 | $13,975 |
| 35 | 20 | 21 | Kyle Petty | Wood Brothers Racing | Ford | 72 | 0 | valve | 58 | $13,455 |
| 36 | 34 | 67 | Eddie Bierschwale | Arrington Racing | Ford | 44 | 0 | engine | 55 | $12,235 |
| 37 | 9 | 4 | Rick Wilson | Morgan–McClure Motorsports | Oldsmobile | 37 | 0 | clutch | 52 | $11,420 |
| 38 | 30 | 82 | Mark Stahl | Stahl Racing | Ford | 36 | 0 | engine | 49 | $9,540 |
| 39 | 26 | 81 | Chet Fillip | Fillip Racing | Ford | 19 | 0 | engine | 46 | $9,705 |
| 40 | 25 | 64 | Connie Saylor | Langley Racing | Ford | 12 | 0 | engine | 43 | $11,470 |
| 41 | 32 | 27 | Rusty Wallace | Blue Max Racing | Pontiac | 10 | 0 | piston | 40 | $15,720 |
| 42 | 41 | 14 | A. J. Foyt | A. J. Foyt Racing | Oldsmobile | 10 | 0 | spark plug | 37 | $7,870 |
Failed to qualify or withdrew
| 43 | | 74 | Bobby Wawak | Wawak Racing | Chevrolet | | | | | |
| 44 | | 51 | David Simko | Simko Racing | Chevrolet | | | | | |
| 45 | | 02 | Joe Booher | Booher Racing | Pontiac | | | | | |
| 46 | | 92 | Ralph Jones | LC Racing | Ford | | | | | |
| 47 | | 93 | Charlie Baker | Salmon Racing | Chevrolet | | | | | |
| 48 | | 39 | Blackie Wangerin | Wangerin Racing | Ford | | | | | |
| 49 | | 24 | Grant Adcox | Adcox Racing | Chevrolet | | | | | |
| 50 | | 62 | Steve Christman (R) | Winkle Motorsports | Pontiac | | | | | |
| 51 | | 32 | Jonathan Lee Edwards | Edwards Racing | Chevrolet | | | | | |
| 52 | | 49 | Delma Cowart | H. L. Waters Racing | Chevrolet | | | | | |
| 53 | | 89 | Jim Sauter | Mueller Brothers Racing | Pontiac | | | | | |
| 54 | | 09 | Jeff Swindell | Swindell Racing | Chevrolet | | | | | |
| 55 | | 18 | Tommy Ellis | Freedlander Motorsports | Chevrolet | | | | | |
| 56 | | 98 | Ed Pimm | Curb Racing | Oldsmobile | | | | | |
| 57 | | 48 | Steve Moore | Hylton Motorsports | Chevrolet | | | | | |
| 58 | | 41 | Ronnie Thomas | Ronnie Thomas Racing | Pontiac | | | | | |
| 59 | | 73 | Phil Barkdoll | Barkdoll Racing | Oldsmobile | | | | | |
| 60 | | 54 | Donnie Allison | Gray Racing | Chevrolet | | | | | |
| 61 | | 00 | Dick McCabe | McCabe Racing | Chevrolet | | | | | |
| WD | | 63 | Jocko Maggiacomo | Linro Motorsports | Chevrolet | | | | | |
Official race results

== Standings after the race ==
Drivers' Championship standings

| Pos | Driver | Points |
|---|---|---|
| 1 | Bill Elliott | 185 |
| 2 | Benny Parsons | 175 (-10) |
| 3 | Richard Petty | 170 (-15) |
| 4 | Buddy Baker | 165 (–20) |
| 5 | Dale Earnhardt | 160 (–25) |
| 6 | Ken Schrader | 151 (–34) |
| 7 | Bobby Allison | 150 (–35) |
| 8 | Darrell Waltrip | 147 (–38) |
| 9 | Ricky Rudd | 138 (–47) |
| 10 | Cale Yarborough | 134 (–51) |
Official driver's standings

- Note: Only the first 10 positions are included for the driver standings.

== Notes ==
| Previous race: 1986 Winston Western 500 | NASCAR Winston Cup Series; 1987 season | Next race: 1987 Goodwrench 500 |
