= Chris Economaki =

American journalist (1920–2012)

- Economaki c. 1977
- Born: Christopher Constantine Economaki; October 15, 1920; Brooklyn, New York, U.S.
- Died: September 28, 2012 (aged 91); Wyckoff, New Jersey, U.S.
- Years active: 1932–2008
- Known for: Motorsports journalism

Christopher Constantine Economaki (October 15, 1920 – September 28, 2012) was a pioneering American motorsports journalist, publisher, reporter, and commentator known as "The Dean of American Motorsports Journalism." Working for, and later owning, National Speed Sport News, Economaki helped encourage the growth of American motorsports from a niche endeavor to a mainstream pursuit.

== Biography ==
=== Background ===
Economaki was born in's grandma's house at 133 Gates Avenue in Clinton Hill, Brooklyn, New York City and raised in Ridgewood, New Jersey. Economaki's father was a Greek immigrant and his mother a great-niece of Robert E. Lee. He saw his first race at age 9 at the board track in Atlantic City. He was immediately hooked on the sport. He once attempted driving a midget car at a cinder track in Pennsylvania. "It wasn't for me," says Economaki. "It was a really frightening experience. That was the first and last time I drove in competition."

Economaki would hang around and help out some of auto racing's most famous drivers at the famous "Gasoline Alley" at Paterson, New Jersey. He helped Duane Carter with the setup on his outboard midget car in 1938 as an unofficial crew chief.

=== Journalist ===
Economaki began his career in auto racing journalism at age 13 selling copies of National Auto Racing News newspapers, now known as the Speed Sport franchise. He wrote his first column at age 14 for the National Auto Racing News. Economaki became the editor of the National Speed Sport News in 1950. He began writing a column called "The Editor's Notebook," which he continued to write over fifty years later. He eventually became owner, publisher, and editor of the National Speed Sport News. The newspaper was considered "America's Weekly Motorsports Authority." Engineer and racing team owner Smokey Yunick considered NSSN "the bible of racing."

His daughter, Corinne Economaki, took over as the publisher until the final issue of National Speed Sport News was published, on March 23, 2011. The National Speed Sport News website was sold in 2012 to Turn 3 Media, LLC (Ralph Sheheen, Curt Moon and Joe Tripp), with longtime colleague Mike Kerchner as current publisher, which includes the website and the expansion of the Speed Sport brand to a magazine and television show (MavTV).

Economaki co-authored an autobiography called Let 'Em All Go: The Story of Auto Racing by the Man who was there.

In the inaugural World 600 in 1960, Don O'Dell's Pontiac smashed the driver's door of Lenny Page's Chevy. Lenny Page, who was lucky to even survive the crash due to the safety systems at that time, was near death afterwards, but Economaki rushed to the scene and aided Page until safety crews arrived. He was later credited with saving Lenny's life.

Later in life, Microsoft chose Economaki to author the auto racing history portion of its Encarta Encyclopedia.

=== Television and radio ===
Economaki began as track announcer at a number of major races in the 1940s and 1950s. He is responsible for introducing millions of Americans to auto racing as an expert TV commentator. He began at the July 4, 1961, running of the Firecracker 250 NASCAR race at Daytona International Speedway for ABC Sports. He covered most ABC Wide World of Sports motorsports events, including several Indianapolis 500s, Daytona 500s, Formula One Grand Prix races, the 24 Hours of Le Mans, the East African Safari, and the Bathurst 1000 in Australia. He would also cover Wide World's less glamorous motorsports assignments, such as demolition derbies. He was mostly reporting in the pits but would fill in as commentator when regular analysts such as Rodger Ward, Jackie Stewart or Sam Posey would be unavailable.

For several years during the 1960s, Economaki contributed "Sport of Speed" segments twice each weekend to the NBC Radio Network program Monitor.

After 23 years, Economaki switched to CBS Sports. He covered International Race of Champions (IROC) events, Daytona 500s, and Formula One Grand Prix events.

Economaki contributed to ESPN's SpeedWeek, and TBS' Motorweek Illustrated. Economaki also covered Formula One races on ESPN in 1988 alongside British race driver and commentator David Hobbs, before being replaced by the younger Bob Varsha from 1989.

In February 1988, Economaki was the expert pit reporter for Australian television station Channel 7 for the first ever NASCAR race run outside of North America, the Goodyear NASCAR 500 at the Calder Park Thunderdome in Melbourne. Economaki had previously worked for Seven during the Bathurst 1000 telecasts of the late 1970s and early 1980s, mainly working as a pit reporter. He would later return to Australia to work as a pit reporter for Ch.7 during the telecast of the 1993 Tooheys 1000 at Bathurst.

Economaki covered several types of auto racing, including sprint cars, Championship Cars, stock cars, drag racers, and Can-Am cars.

From 1995 until 2008, Economaki was a part of the Indianapolis Motor Speedway Radio Network coverage of the Indianapolis 500, working as a color commentator.

=== Awards/Halls of Fame ===
Economaki received numerous major awards. He was inducted in the Motorsports Hall of Fame of America in 1994. He was inducted in the National Sprint Car Hall of Fame in 1993. He was awarded the 1990 NASCAR Award of Excellence, and the NASCAR Lifetime Achievement Award in 1998.

Other awards bestowed upon Economaki included:

- Inducted into Oceanside Rotary Club of Daytona Beach Stock Car Racing Hall of Fame in 1993
- Inducted into the Indianapolis Motor Speedway Hall of Fame
- Inducted into the National Midget Auto Racing Hall of Fame in 2002
- Tom Marchese Award
- 1973 Hernry McLemore Award
- 1978 Ken Purdy Award
- 1981 Ray Marquette Award
- First recipient of the 1982 Patrick Jacquemart Award
- 1984 Dave Fritzlen Award (by the Chicago Boys Club)
- 1984 Walt Ader Memorial Award
- First Hugh Deery Memorial Award for Service to Auto Racing
- 1990 USAC Presidential Award
- 1990 Charlotte Speedway Award
- 1996 Louis Meyer Award
- 2000 NASCAR/Federal Mogul Buddy Shuman award
- 2001 International Automotive Media Council Lifetime Achievement Award
- Was part of the CBS broadcast team which won the Sports Emmy for "Outstanding Live Sports Special" (1987 Daytona 500)

The Economaki Champion of Champions Award is named after him.

A day at the Dodge Charger 500 at the Darlington Raceway race weekend is named "Chris Economaki Day."

The press room at the Indianapolis Motor Speedway was named the Economaki Press Conference Room in 2006. Pocono Raceway named its press box The Chris Economaki Press Box. New Jersey Motorsports Park's media center is named The Chris Economaki Media Center.

=== Acting career ===
Economaki appeared as a pit reporter in the movies Stroker Ace and Six Pack.

=== Death ===
Economaki died in Wyckoff, New Jersey, aged 91.

== See also ==
- List of Indianapolis 500 broadcasters
- List of National Sprint Car Hall of Fame inductees
