= NASCAR on television in the 1970s =

One of the earliest telecasts of a NASCAR race was the 1960 Daytona 500, parts of which was presented as part of CBS Sports Spectacular, with announcer Bud Palmer.

In the ensuing years, but before 1979, there were three main sources of NASCAR telecasts:

- ABC's Wide World of Sports, the sports anthology program, provided coverage of select NASCAR Winston Cup races in the 1970s. In 1971, it presented a 200-lap race at Greenville-Pickens Speedway in its entirety, the first such broadcast of a NASCAR race. Throughout the 1970s, ABC presented portions of the Daytona 500, Southern 500, and other important races.
- In the late 1970s, CBS Sports Spectacular aired some races; like Wide World of Sports, they were taped and edited.
- Car and Track, a weekly auto racing show hosted by Bud Lindemann, recapped all of NASCAR's top-series races in the 1960s and 1970s in a weekly 30-minute syndicated show.

CBS Sports President Neal Pilson and motor-sports editor Ken Squier believed that America would watch an entire stock car race live on television. On February 18, 1979, CBS presented the first flag-to-flag coverage of the Daytona 500. Richard Petty won NASCAR's crown-jewel race for the sixth time, but the big story was the post-race fight on the track's infield between Cale Yarborough and Donnie Allison, who crashed together on the final lap while leading. The race drew incredible ratings, in part due to the compelling action both on and off the track, and in part because a major snowstorm on the East Coast kept millions of viewers indoors.

== List of races televised ==
=== 1970-1971 ===
Year	Date	Event	Track	Network	Coverage	Lap-by-lap	Color commentator(s)	Reporters
1970	February 22	Daytona 500	Daytona	ABC	Highlights	Keith Jackson	Chris Economaki	
1970	April 22	Alabama 500	Talladega	ABC	Live	Bill Flemming	Keith Jackson	Bob Montgomery
1970	April 18	Gwyn Staley 400	North Wilkesboro	ABC	Live	Jim McKay	Chris Economaki	Bob Montgomery
1970	May 9	Rebel 400	Darlington	ABC	Live	Jim McKay	Ned Jarrett	Bob Montgomery
1970	May 24	World 600	Charlotte	ABC	Live	Keith Jackson	Chris Economaki	Bob Montgomery
1970	July 4	Firecracker 400	Daytona	ABC	Highlights	Jim McKay	Chris Economaki	Bob Montgomery
1970	July 25	Nashville 420	Fairgrounds	ABC	Live	Jim McKay	Chris Economaki	Bob Montgomery
1970	September 7	Southern 500	Darlington	ABC	Highlights	Bill Flemming	Chris Economaki	
1970	October 4	Wilkes 400	North Wilkesboro	ABC	Highlights	Jim McKay	Chris Economaki	
1970	October 11	National 500	Charlotte	ABC	Highlights	Jim McKay	Chris Economaki	
1971	February 11	Twin 125's	Daytona	ABC	Highlights	Keith Jackson	Chris Economaki	
1971	February 14	Daytona 500	Daytona	ABC	Highlights	Keith Jackson	Chris Economaki	
1971	April 4	Atlanta 500	Atlanta	ABC	Live	Bill Flemming	Chris Economaki	
1971	April 10	Greenville 200	Greenville-Pickens	ABC	Live	Jim McKay	Chris Economaki	Ken Squier
1971	May 2	Rebel 400	Darlington	ABC	Highlights	Keith Jackson	Chris Economaki	
1971	May 16	Winston 500	Talladega	ABC	Highlights	Bill Flemming	Chris Economaki	
1971	July 4	Firecracker 400	Daytona	ABC	Highlights	Keith Jackson	Chris Economaki	
1971	August 6	Myers Brothers 250	Bowman Gray	ABC	Highlights	Jim McKay	Chris Economaki	
1971	September 6	Southern 500	Darlington	ABC	Highlights	Bill Flemming	Chris Economaki	
1971	October 10	National 500	Charlotte	ABC	Highlights	Keith Jackson	Chris Economaki	

From 1962 to 1978, the Daytona 500 was shown on ABC's Wide World of Sports. During the 1960s and early 1970s, the race was filmed and an edited highlight package aired the following weekend.

During the period on Wide World of Sports, the booth announcers typically served as roving pit reporters during the running of the race, as well as interviewing in victory lane. In the event of a three person team only the pit reporter would be reporting while commentary was separately recording. The booth commentary was recorded in post-production.

=== 1972 ===
Date	Event	Network	Lap-by-lap	Color commentator(s)	Reporters
2/17	Daytona 125	ABC	Keith Jackson	Chris Economaki	
2/20	Daytona 500	ABC	Keith Jackson	Chris Economaki	
3/5	Miller High Life 500 (Ontario)	ABC	Jim McKay	Jackie Stewart	Chris Economaki
3/12	Carolina 500 (Rockingham)	ABC	Keith Jackson	Donnie Allison	Gary Campbell
3/26	Atlanta 500	ABC	Keith Jackson	Chris Economaki	Gary Campbell
4/16	Rebel 400 (Darlington)	ABC	Bill Flemming	Donnie Allison	
7/4	Firecracker 400 (Daytona)	ABC	Keith Jackson	Chris Economaki	
9/4	Southern 500 (Darlington)	ABC	Chris Economaki		
10/8	National 500 (Charlotte)	ABC	Keith Jackson	Roger Penske	Chris Economaki

=== 1973 ===
Date	Event	Network	Lap-by-lap	Color commentator(s)	Reporters
2/15	Twin 125's (Daytona)	ABC	Jim McKay	Jackie Stewart	Chris Economaki
2/18	Daytona 500	ABC	Jim McKay	Jackie Stewart	Chris Economaki
4/1	Atlanta 500	ABC	Keith Jackson	Jackie Stewart	Chris Economaki
4/15	Rebel 500 (Darlington)	ABC	Bill Flemming	Chris Economaki	
7/4	Firecracker 400 (Daytona)	ABC	Keith Jackson	Jackie Stewart	Chris Economaki
8/12	Talladega 500 (Talladega)	ABC	Bill Flemming	Jackie Stewart	
9/3	Southern 500 (Darlington)	ABC	Bill Flemming	Chris Economaki	
10/7	National 500 (Charlotte)	ABC	Keith Jackson	Roger Penske	

=== 1974 ===
Date	Event	Network	Lap-by-lap	Color commentator(s)	Reporters
2/14	Twin 125's	ABC	Keith Jackson	Jackie Stewart	Chris Economaki
2/17	Daytona 500	ABC	Keith Jackson	Jackie Stewart	Chris Economaki
3/24	Atlanta 500 (Atlanta)	ABC	Keith Jackson	Jackie Stewart	Chris Economaki
5/19	Mason Dixon 500 (Dover)	ABC	Bill Flemming	Chris Economaki	
7/4	Firecracker 400 (Daytona)	ABC	Keith Jackson	Jackie Stewart	Chris Economaki
8/11	Talladega 500 (Talladega)	ABC	Bill Flemming	Jackie Stewart	
9/2	Southern 500 (Darlington)	ABC	Chris Economaki	Jackie Stewart	
10/6	National 500 (Charlotte)	ABC	Jim McKay	Chris Economaki	

In 1974, ABC began the first semi-live coverage (joined-in-progress) of the Daytona 500. Coverage was normally timed to begin when the race was halfway over. Brief taped highlights of the start and early segments were shown, then ABC joined the race live already in progress, picking up approximately the last 90 minutes of the race. This format continued through 1978.

=== 1975 ===
Date	Event	Network	Lap-by-lap	Color commentator(s)	Reporters
2/13	Twin 125's (Daytona)	ABC	Chris Economaki	Jackie Stewart	
2/16	Daytona 500	ABC	Keith Jackson	Jackie Stewart	Chris Economaki
3/23	Atlanta 500 (Atlanta)	ABC	Jim McKay	Jackie Stewart	Chris Economaki
4/19	Rebel 500 (Darlington)	ABC	Bill Flemming	Jackie Stewart	
5/4	Winston 500 (Talladega)	CBS	Ken Squier		
5/25	World 600 (Charlotte)	CBS	Ken Squier		
7/4	Firecracker 400 (Daytona)	ABC	Keith Jackson	Jackie Stewart	Chris Economaki
8/24	Champion Spark Plug 400 (Michigan)	CBS	Ken Squier	Johnny Rutherford	
9/1	Southern 500 (Darlington)	ABC	Keith Jackson	Darel Dieringer	
10/5	National 500 (Charlotte)	ABC	Jim McKay	Jackie Stewart	Chris Economaki
11/9	Dixie 500 (Atlanta)	CBS	Ken Squier	Johnny Rutherford	

=== 1976 ===
Date	Event	Network	Lap-by-lap	Color commentator(s)	Reporters
2/15	Daytona 500	ABC	Bill Flemming	Jackie Stewart	Chris Economaki
3/21	Atlanta 500	ABC	Bill Flemming	Jackie Stewart	Chris Economaki
4/11	Rebel 500 (Darlington)	ABC			
5/2	Winston 500 (Talladega)	CBS	Ken Squier	Lee Petty	Ned Jarrett
5/30	World 600 (Charlotte)	CBS	Ken Squier		
6/13	Riverside 400	CBS	Ken Squier	Richard Petty	
7/4	Firecracker 400 (Daytona)	ABC	Bill Flemming	Sam Posey	Chris Economaki
8/8	Talladega 500	CBS	Ken Squier	Lee Petty	
8/22	Champion Spark Plug 400 (Michigan)	CBS	Ken Squier	Donnie Allison	Ned Jarrett
9/6	Southern 500 (Darlington)	ABC	Bill Flemming	Jackie Stewart	
10/10	National 500 (Charlotte)	ABC	Keith Jackson	Chris Economaki	
11/7	Dixie 500 (Atlanta)	CBS	Ken Squier		
11/21	Los Angeles Times 500 (Ontario)	ABC	Jim McKay	Chris Economaki	

The 1976 Daytona 500 was held on the same day of the final day of competition in the Winter Olympics (also broadcast on ABC). ABC carried 30 minutes of live coverage of the start of the race, then switched to the Olympics for 90 minutes to carry taped coverage of the final two competitive events (a cross-country ski race and the final runs in the bobsled), held earlier that day. Then it was back to Daytona for about an hour-and-a-half for the finish.

=== 1977-1979 ===
Year	Date	Event	Track	Network	Coverage	Commentary		Pit Reporters
Year	Date	Event	Track	Network	Coverage	Lap-by-lap	Color	Pit Reporters
1977	February 17	Twin 125's	Daytona	ABC	Highlights	Jim McKay	Jackie Stewart	Chris Economaki
1977	February 20	Daytona 500	Daytona	ABC	Live	Jim McKay	Jackie Stewart	Chris Economaki
1977	March 20	Atlanta 500	Atlanta	ABC	Live	Keith Jackson	Jackie Stewart	Chris Economaki
1977	April 3	Rebel 500	Darlington	ABC	Live	Keith Jackson	Jackie Stewart	Chris Economaki
1977	May 29	World 600	Charlotte	CBS	Highlights	Ken Squier	David Hobbs	Brock Yates
1977	July 4	Firecracker 400	Daytona	ABC	Highlights	Bill Flemming	Chris Economaki	
1977	August 7	Talladega 500	Talladega	CBS	Highlights	Ken Squier	Lee Petty	
1977	September 5	Southern 500	Darlington	ABC	Highlights	Bill Flemming	Jackie Stewart	
1977	October 8	National 500	Charlotte	ABC	Highlights	Al Michaels	Chris Economaki	
1977	November 20	Los Angeles Times 500	Ontario	CBS	Highlights	Ken Squier	David Hobbs	Brock Yates
1978	February 16	Twin 125's	Daytona	ABC	Highlights	Jim McKay	Jackie Stewart	Chris Economaki
1978	February 19	Daytona 500	Daytona	ABC	Live	Jim McKay	Jackie Stewart	Chris Economaki
1978	March 19	Atlanta 500	Atlanta	ABC	Live	Al Michaels	Jackie Stewart	Chris Economaki
1978	April 8	Rebel 500	Darlington	ABC	Live	Jim McKay	Jackie Stewart	Chris Economaki
1978	May 28	World 600	Charlotte	CBS	Highlights	Ken Squier	David Hobbs	Brock Yates
1978	June 18	Gabriel 400	Michigan	ABC	Highlights	Al Michaels	Jackie Stewart	Chris Economaki
1978	July 4	Firecracker 400	Daytona	ABC	Highlights	Jim McKay	Chris Economaki	
1978	August 6	Talladega 500	Talladega	CBS	Highlights	Ken Squier	Lee Petty	
1978	September 4	Southern 500	Darlington	ABC	Highlights	Keith Jackson	Chris Economaki	
1978	October 8	National 500	Charlotte	ABC	Highlights	Jim McKay	Jackie Stewart	Chris Economaki
1978	November 19	Los Angeles Times 500	Ontario	CBS	Highlights	Ken Squier	David Hobbs	Brock Yates
1979	February 11	Busch Clash	Daytona	CBS	Live	Ken Squier	David Hobbs	Brock Yates
1979	February 15	Twin 125's	Daytona	CBS	Highlights	Ken Squier	David Hobbs	Ned Jarrett; Brock Yates
1979	February 18	Daytona 500	Daytona	CBS	Live	Ken Squier	David Hobbs	Ned Jarrett; Brock Yates
1979	March 18	Atlanta 500	Atlanta	ABC	Highlights	Al Michaels	Jackie Stewart	Chris Economaki
1979	April 3	Rebel 500	Darlington	ABC	Live	Jim McKay	Jackie Stewart	Chris Economaki
1979	April 22	Virginia 500	Martinsville	MRN TV	Highlights	Jack Arute	Ned Jarrett	
1979	April 29	Winston 500	Talladega	MRN TV	Highlights	Jack Arute	Ned Jarrett	
1979	May 27	World 600	Charlotte	CBS	Highlights	Ken Squier	David Hobbs	Ned Jarrett; Brock Yates
1979	June 17	Gabriel 400	Michigan	ABC	Highlights	Al Michaels	Jackie Stewart	Chris Economaki
1979	July 4	Firecracker 400	Daytona	ABC	Highlights	Keith Jackson	Sam Posey	Chris Economaki
1979	August 5	Talladega 500	Talladega	CBS	Live	Ken Squier	Lee Petty	Ned Jarrett; Brock Yates
1979	September 3	Southern 500	Darlington	ABC	Highlights	Bill Flemming	Jackie Stewart	
1979	October 7	National 500	Charlotte	NBC	Highlights	Paul Page	Johnny Rutherford	
1979	November 18	Los Angeles Times 500	Ontario	CBS	Highlights	Ken Squier	David Hobbs	Brock Yates

In 1979, CBS instituted the live "flag-to-flag" coverage policy. The ground-breaking 1979 broadcast ushered in the 22-year run of NASCAR on CBS.

During its entire run from 1979 to 2000, CBS also carried the Busch Clash (live), and in most years, carried the Twin 125s (tape-delayed).

== See also ==
- NASCAR on television in the 1960s
  - NASCAR on television in the 1980s
  - NASCAR on television in the 1990s
  - NASCAR on television in the 2000s
  - NASCAR on television in the 2010s
  - NASCAR on television in the 2020s
- List of Daytona 500 broadcasters
- List of Wide World of Sports (American TV series) announcers
- List of events broadcast on Wide World of Sports (American TV program)
