= NASCAR on television in the 1960s =

One of the earliest telecasts of a NASCAR race was the 1960 Daytona 500, parts of which was presented as part of CBS Sports Spectacular, with announcer Bud Palmer.

In the ensuing years, but before 1979, there were three main sources of NASCAR telecasts:

- ABC's Wide World of Sports, the sports anthology program, provided coverage of select NASCAR Winston Cup races in the 1970s. In 1971, it presented a 200-lap race at Greenville-Pickens Speedway in its entirety, the first such broadcast of a NASCAR race. Throughout the 1970s, ABC presented portions of the Daytona 500, Southern 500, and other important races.
- In the late 1970s, CBS Sports Spectacular aired some races; like Wide World of Sports, they were taped and edited.
- Car and Track, a weekly auto racing show hosted by Bud Lindemann, recapped all of NASCAR's top-series races in the 1960s and 1970s in a weekly 30-minute syndicated show.

== List of races televised ==
=== 1960 ===
| Date | Event | Network | Lap-by-lap |
|---|---|---|---|
| 2/12 | Twin 100's | CBS | Bud Palmer |

In February 1960, CBS sent a "skeleton" production crew to Daytona Beach, Florida and the Daytona International Speedway to cover the Daytona 500's Twin 100 (now The Duel at Daytona) qualifying races on February 12, 1960. The production crew also stayed to broadcast portions of the Daytona 500 itself, two days later. The event was hosted by John S. Palmer. CBS would continue to broadcast portions of races for the next 18 years, along with ABC and NBC.

=== 1961 ===
| Date | Event | Network | Lap-by-lap | Color commentator(s) |
|---|---|---|---|---|
| 7/4 | Firecracker 250 (Daytona) | ABC | Bill Flemming | Chris Economaki |

=== 1962 ===
| Date | Event | Network | Lap-by-lap | Color commentator(s) | Reporters |
|---|---|---|---|---|---|
| 2/18 | Daytona 500 | ABC | Jim McKay | Stirling Moss | Chris Economaki |
| 7/4 | Firecracker 250 (Daytona) | ABC | Bill Flemming | Chris Economaki | |
| 9/3 | Southern 500 (Darlington) | ABC | Jim McKay | Chris Economaki | |

From 1962 to 1978, the Daytona 500 was shown on ABC's Wide World of Sports. During the 1960s and early 1970s, the race was filmed and an edited highlight package aired the following weekend. In 1974, ABC began the first semi-live coverage (joined-in-progress) of the Daytona 500. Coverage was normally timed to begin when the race was halfway over. Brief taped highlights of the start and early segments were shown, then ABC joined the race live already in progress, picking up approximately the last 90 minutes of the race. This format continued through 1978.

=== 1963 ===
| Date | Event | Track | Network | Lap-by-lap | Color commentator(s) |
|---|---|---|---|---|---|
| 2/24 | Daytona 500 | Daytona | ABC | Bill Flemming | Chris Economaki |
| 7/4 | Firecracker 400 | Daytona | ABC | Bill Flemming | Chris Economaki |

=== 1964 ===
| Date | Event | Network | Lap-by-lap | Color commentator(s) | Reporters |
|---|---|---|---|---|---|
| 2/23 | Daytona 500 | ABC | Bill Flemming | Stirling Moss | Chris Economaki |
| 4/5 | Atlanta 500 | CBS | | | |
| 5/24 | World 600 | NBC | | | |
| 10/18 | National 400 (Charlotte) | ABC | Jim McKay | Chris Economaki | |

=== 1965 ===
| Date | Event | Network | Lap-by-lap | Color commentator(s) | Reporters |
|---|---|---|---|---|---|
| 2/14 | Daytona 500 | ABC | Bill Flemming | Dan Gurney | |
| 5/8 | Rebel 300 (Darlington) | ABC | Jim McKay | Chris Economaki | |
| 7/4 | Firecracker 400 (Daytona) | ABC | Bill Flemming | Chris Economaki | |
| 9/6 | Southern 500 (Darlington) | ABC | Jim McKay | Rodger Ward | Chris Economaki |
| 10/17 | National 400 (Charlotte) | ABC | Bill Flemming | Rodger Ward | Chris Economaki |

=== 1966 ===
| Date | Event | Network | Lap-by-lap | Color commentator(s) | Reporters |
|---|---|---|---|---|---|
| 2/27 | Daytona 500 | ABC | Curt Gowdy | Rodger Ward | Chris Economaki |
| 4/30 | Rebel 400 (Darlington) | ABC | Jim McKay | Bill France | |
| 7/4 | Firecracker 400 (Daytona) | ABC | Jim McKay | Rodger Ward | Chris Economaki |
| 9/5 | Southern 500 (Darlington) | ABC | Bill Flemming | Rodger Ward | Chris Economaki |
| 10/16 | National 500 (Charlotte) | ABC | Jim McKay | Rodger Ward | Chris Economaki |

=== 1967-69 ===
| Year | Date | Event | Track | Network | Coverage | Lap-by-lap | Color commentator(s) | Pit Reporters |
|---|---|---|---|---|---|---|---|---|
| 1967 | February 24 | Twin 100 Races | Daytona | ABC | Highlights | Jim McKay | Chris Economaki | |
| 1967 | February 26 | Daytona 500 | Daytona | ABC | Highlights | Jim McKay | Chris Economaki | |
| 1967 | May 13 | Rebel 400 | Darlington | ABC | Highlights | Chris Economaki | Fred Lorenzen | |
| 1967 | July 4 | Firecracker 400 | Daytona | ABC | Highlights | Jim McKay | Fred Lorenzen | Chris Economaki |
| 1967 | September 4 | Southern 500 | Darlington | ABC | Highlights | Bill Flemming | Fred Lorenzen | Chris Economaki |
| 1967 | October 20 | National 400 | Charlotte | ABC | Highlights | Keith Jackson | Ned Jarrett | |
| 1968 | February 25 | Daytona 500 | Daytona | ABC | Highlights | Bill Flemming | Chris Economaki | |
| 1968 | May 11 | Rebel 400 | Darlington | ABC | Highlights | Bill Flemming | Fred Lorenzen | |
| 1968 | July 4 | Firecracker 400 | Daytona | ABC | Highlights | | | |
| 1968 | September 2 | Southern 500 | Darlington | ABC | Highlights | Bill Flemming | Chris Economaki | |
| 1968 | October 20 | National 500 | Charlotte | ABC | Highlights | Jim McKay | Fred Lorenzen | Chris Economaki |
| 1969 | February 23 | Daytona 500 | Daytona | ABC | Highlights | Bill Flemming | Chris Economaki | |
| 1969 | March 30 | Atlanta 500 | Atlanta | ABC | Highlights | Bill Flemming | Chris Economaki | |
| 1969 | May 10 | Rebel 400 | Darlington | ABC | Highlights | Jim McKay | Chris Economaki | |
| 1969 | July 4 | Firecracker 400 | Daytona | ABC | Highlights | Jim McKay | Chris Economaki | |
| 1969 | September 1 | Southern 500 | Darlington | ABC | Highlights | Bill Flemming | Chris Economaki | |
| 1969 | October 12 | National 500 | Charlotte | ABC | Highlights | Jim McKay | Chris Economaki | |

== See also ==
- List of Daytona 500 broadcasters
- List of Wide World of Sports (American TV series) announcers
- List of events broadcast on Wide World of Sports (American TV program)
- NASCAR on television in the 1970s
  - NASCAR on television in the 1980s
  - NASCAR on television in the 1990s
  - NASCAR on television in the 2000s
  - NASCAR on television in the 2010s
  - NASCAR on television in the 2020s
