= NASCAR on television in the 2000s =

Until 2001, race tracks struck individual agreements with networks to broadcast races, but NASCAR wanted to capitalize on the growing popularity of the sport and announced in 1999 that television contracts would now be centralized; that is, instead of making agreements with individual tracks, networks would now negotiate directly with NASCAR for the rights to air a package of races.

== Contract overview ==
=== 2001–2006: Fox, NBC, Turner Sports ===
On December 15, 1999, Fox Sports, FX, NBC and Turner Sports agreed to pay $2.4 billion for a new six-year television package, covering the Winston/Nextel Cup Series and Busch Series schedules.

Fox and FX would be responsible for covering the first half of the season. All Busch Series races during that part of the season would also be on Fox/FX. NBC and Turner would partner to cover the second half of the season, which beginning in 2004 would include the Chase for the Cup. Originally, Turner's broadcast outlet for its NASCAR coverage was to be TBS as it had been for every other race Turner had broadcast before. However, Turner Broadcasting opted to rebrand its sister network TNT as a drama-heavy network and decided to move the NASCAR coverage there in March 2001 as they felt it fit the new branding better.

- As part of the new contract, the Daytona events were split evenly between the networks. Fox would air the Daytona 500 in every odd numbered year during the contract, with NBC covering the then-Pepsi 400 those years. NBC would then, in turn, air the Daytona 500 in every even-numbered year with Fox receiving the Pepsi 400.
- The network in charge of Daytona 500 coverage would also have the rights to air the events during Speedweeks, which consisted of the Budweiser Shootout, Daytona 500 pole qualifying, the two qualifying races held after pole qualifying, and the season opening Busch race.

ESPN retained the rights to the Craftsman Truck Series through 2002 under a separate contract. Beginning in 2003, Speed Channel bought out the rest of ESPN's contract and became the exclusive broadcast home of that series.

Initially, practice and qualifying sessions would alter between Fox Sports Net and FX during the Fox/FX portion of the season and between TNT and CNNSI during the NBC/TNT portion of the season. By the end of 2002, Speed had replaced Fox Sports Net and, due to CNN/SI shutting down in the spring of 2002, a deal was arranged with NBC/TNT to move most practice and qualifying sessions to Speed as well using NBC/TNT's production team and Speed graphics.

=== 2007–2014: Fox, ESPN, Turner Sports ===
Late in 2005, NBC announced that they no longer wanted to carry NASCAR races on their schedule. ABC/ESPN took the opportunity to regain the series. On December 12, 2005, NASCAR announced its next TV contract: eight years, $4.8 billion with Fox/Speed Channel, ABC/ESPN, and TNT. This time, the deal bundled the Camping World Truck Series in with the Sprint Cup and Nationwide series:

- Fox broadcast the first 13 Cup races along with the Sprint Unlimited every year, including the Daytona 500. The package ran through the first weekend in June and (usually) the race at Dover International Speedway. Due to schedule adjustments, the package ended in 2010 with the Coca-Cola 600 and in 2011 with the spring Kansas race.
- TNT, which split from former partner NBC, continued with the following six races at Pocono, Michigan, Sonoma, Kentucky, Daytona (Coke Zero 400), and Loudon. The Coke Zero 400 was presented with limited commercial interruptions until 2013. The Kentucky race replaced the race at Chicagoland Speedway in 2011.
- ESPN networks broadcast the remainder of the Cup schedule, beginning at the Brickyard 400; From 2007 to 2009, ABC carried coverage of the last race before the Chase at Richmond and all Chase for the Sprint Cup events, although in 2010 (following NASCAR's shift to standardized start times for races), only three races were aired on ABC, and the majority of coverage was allotted to ESPN networks.
- ESPN networks held exclusive rights to the Nationwide Series across the entire season, with races on ESPN, ESPN2, and ABC.
- Speed Channel moved two of its Camping World Truck Series races to Fox from 2007–09; usually, they were scheduled to be the California race and the spring race at Martinsville. From 2010 to 2013, all CWTS races were on Speed; Fox returned to the series in 2014 with its telecast of the Talladega race.
- Qualifying sessions for Sprint Cup races aired on Fox for the Daytona 500, Speed/FS1 for the next 18 races, and alternating between Speed/FS1 and ESPN/ESPN2 for the remaining 17 races.
- NASCAR Cup Series practice sessions were broadcast by Speed/FS1 for the first 19 races and alternated between Speed/FS1 and ESPN2 for the remaining 17 races. Speed/FS1 was guaranteed at least one session each weekend during the ESPN portion of the schedule.
- Nationwide Series practice and qualifying alternated between Speed/FS1 and ESPN2 throughout the entire season.
- On the pay-per-view front, DirecTV premiered NASCAR Hot Pass at the 2007 Daytona 500. The package consists of four channels, each dedicated to a particular driver with team communications among the driver, crew chief, and spotter. From 2007–08, Hot Pass also had separate lap-by-lap announcers and color commentators for each channel. In 2009 NASCAR Hot Pass became free, although without announcers, and on January 7, 2013, it was discontinued all together.

NBC and FX no longer carried NASCAR as a result. NBC was paying $2.8 billion for six years of Sunday night telecasts of the National Football League starting in 2006. Both the new NFL and old NASCAR deals overlapped in 2006, which forced some postrace coverage at NBC races to air on CNBC. FX stopped airing sporting events from 2006 to 2010. (It did show the ninth inning of a rain-delayed Fox game between the New York Yankees and the Boston Red Sox when it conflicted with the start of the 2008 Subway Fresh Fit 500, as well as other games which overran into the starts of NASCAR races. Beginning in 2010, Fox's MLB games during NASCAR Saturdays were shifted to early in the afternoon.)

The new contracts increased the amount of coverage from each weekend's races. When the 2007 season began, all practices for NASCAR Cup Series races were televised, whereas only the final practice ("happy hour") was carried before. In addition, all Nationwide Series final practices and qualifying sessions were also shown; before, a few qualifying sessions were not seen and only a handful of practices were seen. Most, if not all, truck series time trials are also broadcast.

From 2007 to 2010, average race viewership fell from 7.85 million at its height to 5.99 million in 2010, according to the Sports Business Journal.

== List of races televised ==
=== Cup ===
Year	Date	Event	Track	Network	Coverage	Commentary		Pit reporters	Pre Race	
Year	Date	Event	Track	Network	Coverage	Lap-by-lap	Color	Pit reporters	Host	Analysts
2000	February 13	Bud Shootout Qualifier	Daytona	ESPN	Live	Bob Jenkins	Benny Parsons; Ray Evernham	Jerry Punch; Bill Weber	—N/a	—N/a
2000	February 13	Bud Shootout	Daytona	CBS	Live	Mike Joy	Ned Jarrett; Buddy Baker	Dick Berggren; Ralph Sheheen; Bill Stephens	Ken Squier	—N/a
2000	February 17	Gatorade 125s	Daytona	CBS	Highlights	Mike Joy	Ned Jarrett; Buddy Baker	Dick Berggren; Ralph Sheheen; Bill Stephens	Ken Squier	—N/a
2000	February 20	Daytona 500	Daytona	CBS	Live	Mike Joy	Ned Jarrett; Buddy Baker	Dick Berggren; Ralph Sheheen; Bill Stephens	Ken Squier	—N/a
2000	February 27	Dura Lube/Kmart 400	Rockingham	TNN	Live	Eli Gold	Buddy Baker; Dick Berggren	Glenn Jarrett; Steve Byrnes; Ralph Sheheen	—N/a	—N/a
2000	March 5	CarsDirect.com 400	Las Vegas	ABC	Live	Bob Jenkins	Benny Parsons; Ray Evernham	Jerry Punch; Bill Weber; John Kernan	—N/a	—N/a
2000	March 12	Cracker Barrel 500	Atlanta	ABC	Live	Bob Jenkins	Benny Parsons; Ray Evernham	Jerry Punch; Bill Weber; John Kernan	—N/a	—N/a
2000	March 19	Mall.com 400	Darlington	ESPN	Live	Jerry Punch	Ned Jarrett; Benny Parsons	Bill Weber; John Kernan; Ray Dunlap	—N/a	—N/a
2000	March 26	Food City 500	Bristol	ESPN	Live	Bob Jenkins	Ned Jarrett; Benny Parsons	Jerry Punch; Bill Weber; John Kernan	—N/a	—N/a
2000	April 2	DirecTV 500	Texas	CBS	Live	Mike Joy	Ned Jarrett; Buddy Baker	Dick Berggren; Ralph Sheheen; Bill Stephens	Ken Squier	—N/a
2000	April 9	Goody's Body Pain 500	Martinsville	ESPN	Live	Bob Jenkins	Ned Jarrett; Benny Parsons	Jerry Punch; Bill Weber; John Kernan	—N/a	—N/a
2000	April 16	DieHard 500	Talladega	ABC	Live	Bob Jenkins	Benny Parsons; Ray Evernham	Jerry Punch; Bill Weber; John Kernan	—N/a	—N/a
2000	April 30	NAPA Auto Parts 500	California	ABC	Live	Bob Jenkins	Benny Parsons; Ray Evernham	Jerry Punch; Bill Weber; John Kernan	—N/a	—N/a
2000	May 6	Pontiac Excitement 400	Richmond	ESPN	Live	Bob Jenkins	Ned Jarrett; Benny Parsons	Jerry Punch; Bill Weber; John Kernan	—N/a	—N/a
2000	May 19	No Bull 25 Shootout	Charlotte	TNN	Live	Eli Gold	Buddy Baker; Dick Berggren	Glenn Jarrett; Ralph Sheheen; Randy Pemberton	—N/a	—N/a
2000	May 20	The Winston Open	Charlotte	TNN	Live	Eli Gold	Buddy Baker; Dick Berggren	Glenn Jarrett; Ralph Sheheen; Randy Pemberton	—N/a	—N/a
2000	May 20	No Bull Sprint	Charlotte	TNN	Live	Eli Gold	Buddy Baker; Dick Berggren	Glenn Jarrett; Ralph Sheheen; Randy Pemberton	—N/a	—N/a
2000	May 20	The Winston	Charlotte	TNN	Live	Eli Gold	Buddy Baker; Dick Berggren	Glenn Jarrett; Ralph Sheheen; Randy Pemberton	—N/a	—N/a
2000	May 28	Coca-Cola 600	Charlotte	TBS	Live	Allen Bestwick	Buddy Baker; Dick Berggren	Marty Snider; Mike Hogewood; Mike Massaro	Ken Squier	—N/a
2000	June 4	MBNA Platinum 400	Dover	TNN	Live	Eli Gold	Buddy Baker; Dick Berggren	Glenn Jarrett; Steve Byrnes; Ralph Sheheen	—N/a	—N/a
2000	June 11	Kmart 400	Michigan	CBS; TNN	Live (Note: The 2000 Kmart 400 saw coverage start on CBS but move to TNN after two rain delays and CBS needed to air the SBC Senior Open. TNN used CBS's graphics and commentary for the rest of the race.)	Mike Joy	Ned Jarrett; Buddy Baker	Dick Berggren; Ralph Sheheen; Bill Stephens	Ken Squier	—N/a
2000	~~June 18~~; June 19	Pocono 500	Pocono	TNN	Live (Note: The 2000 Pocono 500 was scheduled to be on June 18th but rescheduled on June 19th due to a rain delay.)	Eli Gold	Buddy Baker	Glenn Jarrett; Dick Berggren	—N/a	—N/a
2000	June 25	Save Mart/Kragen 350	Sonoma	ESPN	Live	Bob Jenkins	Ned Jarrett; Benny Parsons	Jerry Punch; Bill Weber; John Kernan	—N/a	—N/a
2000	July 1	Pepsi 400	Daytona	CBS	Live	Mike Joy	Ned Jarrett; Buddy Baker	Dick Berggren; Ralph Sheheen; Bill Stephens	Ken Squier	—N/a
2000	July 9	thatlook.com 300	New Hampshire	TNN	Live	Eli Gold	Buddy Baker; Dick Berggren	Glenn Jarrett; Steve Byrnes; Ralph Sheheen	—N/a	—N/a
2000	July 23	Pennsylvania 500	Pocono	TBS	Live	Allen Bestwick	Buddy Baker; Dick Berggren	Marty Snider; Mike Hogewood; Mike Massaro	Ken Squier	—N/a
2000	August 5	Brickyard 400	Indianapolis	ABC	Live	Bob Jenkins	Benny Parsons; Ray Evernham	Jerry Punch; Bill Weber; Ray Dunlap	—N/a	—N/a
2000	August 13	Global Crossing @ the Glen	Watkins Glen	ESPN	Live	Bob Jenkins	Ned Jarrett; Benny Parsons	Jerry Punch; Bill Weber; John Kernan	—N/a	—N/a
2000	August 20	Pepsi 400	Michigan	ESPN	Live	Bob Jenkins	Ned Jarrett; Benny Parsons	Jerry Punch; Bill Weber; John Kernan	—N/a	—N/a
2000	August 26	goracing.com 500	Bristol	ESPN	Live	Jerry Punch	Ned Jarrett; Benny Parsons	Bill Weber; John Kernan; Ray Dunlap	—N/a	—N/a
2000	September 3	Pepsi Southern 500	Darlington	ESPN; ESPN2 (Note: The 2000 Pepsi Southern 500 saw coverage start on ESPN but move to ESPN2 due to a rain delay.)	Live	Bob Jenkins	Ned Jarrett; Benny Parsons	Jerry Punch; Bill Weber; John Kernan	—N/a	—N/a
2000	September 9	Chevrolet Monte Carlo 400	Richmond	ESPN	Live	Bob Jenkins	Ned Jarrett; Benny Parsons	Jerry Punch; Bill Weber; John Kernan	—N/a	—N/a
2000	September 17	Dura Lube 300 by Kmart	New Hampshire	TNN	Live	Eli Gold	Buddy Baker; Dick Berggren	Glenn Jarrett; Mike Hogewood; Ralph Sheheen	—N/a	—N/a
2000	September 24	MBNA.com 400	Dover	TNN	Live	Eli Gold	Buddy Baker; Dick Berggren	Glenn Jarrett; Mike Hogewood; Ralph Sheheen	—N/a	—N/a
2000	October 1	NAPA Autocare 500	Martinsville	ESPN	Live	Bob Jenkins	Ned Jarrett; Benny Parsons	Jerry Punch; Bill Weber; John Kernan	—N/a	—N/a
2000	October 8	UAW-GM Quality 500	Charlotte	TBS	Live	Allen Bestwick	Buddy Baker; Dick Berggren	Marty Snider; Mike Hogewood; Mike Massaro	Ken Squier	—N/a
2000	October 15	Winston 500	Talladega	ESPN	Live	Jerry Punch	Ned Jarrett; Benny Parsons	Bill Weber; John Kernan; Ray Dunlap	—N/a	—N/a
2000	October 22	Pop Secret 400	Rockingham	TNN	Live	Eli Gold	Buddy Baker; Dick Berggren	Glenn Jarrett; Steve Byrnes; Ralph Sheheen	—N/a	—N/a
2000	November 5	Checker Auto Parts/DuraLube 500	Phoenix	TNN	Live	Eli Gold	Buddy Baker; Dick Berggren	Glenn Jarrett; Steve Byrnes; Ralph Sheheen	—N/a	—N/a
2000	November 12	Pennzoil 400	Homestead–Miami	NBC	Live	Allen Bestwick	Benny Parsons	Marty Snider; Dave Burns; Mike Massaro	—N/a	—N/a
2000	~~November 19~~; November 20	NAPA 500	Atlanta	ESPN	Live (Note: The 2000 NAPA 500 was scheduled to be on November 19th but rescheduled on November 20th due to a rain delay.)	Bob Jenkins	Ned Jarrett; Benny Parsons	Jerry Punch; Bill Weber; John Kernan	—N/a	—N/a
2001	February 11	Budweiser Shootout	Daytona	Fox	Live	Mike Joy	Darrell Waltrip; Larry McReynolds	Dick Berggren; Steve Byrnes; Matt Yocum; Jeanne Zelasko	Chris Myers	Darrell Waltrip; Jeff Hammond; Ken Squier
2001	February 15	Gatorade Twin 125s	Daytona	FSN	Live	Mike Joy	Darrell Waltrip; Larry McReynolds	Dick Berggren; Steve Byrnes; Matt Yocum; Jeanne Zelasko	Chris Myers	Jeff Hammond; Ken Squier
2001	February 18	Daytona 500	Daytona	Fox	Live	Mike Joy	Darrell Waltrip; Larry McReynolds	Dick Berggren; Steve Byrnes; Matt Yocum; Jeanne Zelasko	Chris Myers	Darrell Waltrip; Jeff Hammond; Ken Squier
2001	February 25	Dura Lube 400	Rockingham	Fox	Live	Mike Joy	Darrell Waltrip; Larry McReynolds	Dick Berggren; Steve Byrnes; Matt Yocum; Jeanne Zelasko	Chris Myers	Darrell Waltrip; Jeff Hammond
2001	February 26	Dura Lube 400	Rockingham	FX (Note: The 2001 Dura Lube 400 saw coverage start on Fox on Sunday but moved to FX on Monday due to a Rain Delay. Jeanne Zelasko was replaced on Monday by Jeff Hammond and Chris Myers did not appear.)	Live	Mike Joy	Darrell Waltrip; Larry McReynolds	Dick Berggren; Steve Byrnes; Matt Yocum; Jeff Hammond	—N/a	—N/a
2001	March 4	UAW-Daimler Chrysler 400	Las Vegas	Fox	Live	Mike Joy	Darrell Waltrip; Larry McReynolds	Dick Berggren; Steve Byrnes; Matt Yocum; Jeanne Zelasko	Chris Myers	Darrell Waltrip; Jeff Hammond
2001	March 11	Cracker Barrel Old Country Store 500	Atlanta	Fox	Live	Mike Joy	Darrell Waltrip; Larry McReynolds	Dick Berggren; Steve Byrnes; Matt Yocum; Jeanne Zelasko	Chris Myers	Darrell Waltrip; Jeff Hammond
2001	March 18	Carolina Dodge Dealers 400	Darlington	Fox	Live	Mike Joy	Darrell Waltrip; Larry McReynolds	Dick Berggren; Steve Byrnes; Matt Yocum; Jeanne Zelasko	Chris Myers	Darrell Waltrip; Jeff Hammond
2001	March 25	Food City 500	Bristol	Fox	Live	Mike Joy	Darrell Waltrip; Larry McReynolds	Dick Berggren; Steve Byrnes; Matt Yocum; Jeanne Zelasko	Chris Myers	Darrell Waltrip; Jeff Hammond
2001	April 1	Harrah's 500	Texas	Fox	Live	Mike Joy	Darrell Waltrip; Larry McReynolds	Dick Berggren; Steve Byrnes; Matt Yocum; Jeanne Zelasko	Chris Myers	Darrell Waltrip; Jeff Hammond
2001	April 8	Virginia 500	Martinsville	Fox	Live	Mike Joy	Darrell Waltrip; Larry McReynolds	Dick Berggren; Steve Byrnes; Matt Yocum	Chris Myers	Darrell Waltrip; Jeff Hammond
2001	April 22	Talladega 500	Talladega	Fox	Live	Mike Joy	Darrell Waltrip; Larry McReynolds	Dick Berggren; Steve Byrnes; Matt Yocum; Jeanne Zelasko	Chris Myers	Darrell Waltrip; Jeff Hammond
2001	April 29	NAPA Auto Parts 500	California	Fox	Live	Mike Joy	Darrell Waltrip; Larry McReynolds	Dick Berggren; Steve Byrnes; Matt Yocum; Jeanne Zelasko	Chris Myers	Darrell Waltrip; Jeff Hammond
2001	May 5	Pontiac Excitement 400	Richmond	FX	Live	Mike Joy	Darrell Waltrip; Larry McReynolds	Dick Berggren; Steve Byrnes; Matt Yocum; Jeanne Zelasko	Chris Myers	Darrell Waltrip; Jeff Hammond
2001	May 19	No Bull Sprint	Charlotte	FX	Live	Mike Joy	Darrell Waltrip; Larry McReynolds	Dick Berggren; Steve Byrnes; Matt Yocum	Chris Myers	Darrell Waltrip; Jeff Hammond
2001	May 19	Winston Open	Charlotte	FX	Live	Mike Joy	Darrell Waltrip; Larry McReynolds	Dick Berggren; Steve Byrnes; Matt Yocum	Chris Myers	Darrell Waltrip; Jeff Hammond
2001	May 19-20 (Note: The 2001 The Winston was started on May 19th but finished in the early hours of May 20th due to a rain delay.)	The Winston	Charlotte	FX	Live	Mike Joy	Darrell Waltrip; Larry McReynolds	Dick Berggren; Steve Byrnes; Matt Yocum	Chris Myers	Darrell Waltrip; Jeff Hammond
2001	May 26	Coca-Cola 600	Charlotte	Fox	Live	Mike Joy	Darrell Waltrip; Larry McReynolds	Dick Berggren; Steve Byrnes; Matt Yocum; Jeanne Zelasko	Chris Myers	Darrell Waltrip; Jeff Hammond
2001	June 3	MBNA Platinum 400	Dover	Fox	Live	Mike Joy	Darrell Waltrip; Larry McReynolds	Dick Berggren; Steve Byrnes; Matt Yocum	Chris Myers	Darrell Waltrip; Jeff Hammond
2001	June 10	Kmart 400	Michigan	FX	Live	Mike Joy	Darrell Waltrip; Larry McReynolds	Dick Berggren; Steve Byrnes; Matt Yocum	Chris Myers	Darrell Waltrip; Jeff Hammond
2001	June 17	Pocono 500	Pocono	Fox	Live	Mike Joy	Darrell Waltrip; Larry McReynolds	Dick Berggren; Steve Byrnes; Matt Yocum	Chris Myers	Darrell Waltrip; Jeff Hammond
2001	June 24	Dodge/Save Mart 350	Sonoma	Fox	Live	Mike Joy	Darrell Waltrip; Larry McReynolds	Dick Berggren; Steve Byrnes; Matt Yocum; Jeanne Zelasko	Chris Myers	Darrell Waltrip; Jeff Hammond
2001	July 7	Pepsi 400	Daytona	NBC	Live	Allen Bestwick	Benny Parsons; Wally Dallenbach Jr.	Dave Burns; Marty Snider; Matt Yocum; Bill Weber	Bill Weber	Benny Parsons
2001	July 15	Tropicana 400	Chicagoland	NBC	Live	Allen Bestwick	Benny Parsons; Wally Dallenbach Jr.	Dave Burns; Marty Snider; Matt Yocum; Bill Weber	Bill Weber	Benny Parsons
2001	July 22	New England 300	New Hampshire	TNT	Live	Allen Bestwick	Benny Parsons; Wally Dallenbach Jr.	Marty Snider; Matt Yocum; Bill Weber	Bill Weber	Benny Parsons
2001	July 29	Pennsylvania 500	Pocono	TNT	Live	Allen Bestwick	Benny Parsons; Wally Dallenbach Jr.	Dave Burns; Marty Snider; Matt Yocum; Bill Weber	Bill Weber	—N/a
2001	August 5	Brickyard 400	Indianapolis	NBC	Live	Allen Bestwick	Benny Parsons; Wally Dallenbach Jr.	Dave Burns; Marty Snider; Matt Yocum; Bill Weber	Bill Weber	Benny Parsons
2001	August 12	Global Crossing at The Glen	Watkins Glen	NBC	Live	Allen Bestwick	Benny Parsons; Wally Dallenbach Jr.	Dave Burns; Marty Snider; Matt Yocum; Bill Weber	Bill Weber	—N/a
2001	August 19	Pepsi 400	Michigan	TNT	Live	Allen Bestwick	Benny Parsons; Wally Dallenbach Jr.	Dave Burns; Marty Snider; Matt Yocum; Bill Weber	Bill Weber	—N/a
2001	August 25	Sharpie 500	Bristol	TNT	Live	Allen Bestwick	Benny Parsons; Wally Dallenbach Jr.	Dave Burns; Marty Snider; Matt Yocum; Bill Weber	Bill Weber	Benny Parsons
2001	September 2	Mountain Dew Southern 500	Darlington	TNT	Live	Allen Bestwick	Benny Parsons; Wally Dallenbach Jr.	Dave Burns; Marty Snider; Matt Yocum; Bill Weber	Bill Weber	Benny Parsons
2001	September 8	Chevrolet Monte Carlo 400	Richmond	TNT	Live	Allen Bestwick	Benny Parsons; Wally Dallenbach Jr.	Dave Burns; Marty Snider; Matt Yocum; Bill Weber	Bill Weber	Benny Parsons
2001	September 23	MBNA Cal Ripken Jr. 400	Dover	NBC	Live	Allen Bestwick	Benny Parsons; Wally Dallenbach Jr.	Dave Burns; Marty Snider; Matt Yocum; Bill Weber	Bill Weber	Benny Parsons
2001	September 30	Protection One 400	Kansas	NBC	Live	Allen Bestwick	Benny Parsons; Wally Dallenbach Jr.	Dave Burns; Marty Snider; Matt Yocum; Bill Weber	Bill Weber	Benny Parsons
2001	October 7	UAW-GM Quality 500	Charlotte	NBC; TNT	Live (Note: The 2001 UAW-GM Quality 500 was scheduled to be on NBC but was moved to TNT because NBC News needed to broadcast George W. Bush's announcement of the War in Afghanistan, NBC returned for the final 25 laps of the race.)	Allen Bestwick	Benny Parsons; Wally Dallenbach Jr.	Dave Burns; Marty Snider; Matt Yocum; Bill Weber	Bill Weber	Benny Parsons
2001	~~October 14~~; October 15	Old Dominion 500	Martinsville	NBC; TNT	Live (Note: The 2001 Old Dominion 500 was scheduled to be on NBC but a rain delay to Monday meant it had to be moved to TNT which aired the race the following day.)	Allen Bestwick	Benny Parsons; Wally Dallenbach Jr.	Dave Burns; Marty Snider; Matt Yocum; Bill Weber	Bill Weber	—N/a
2001	October 21	EA Sports 500	Talladega	NBC	Live	Allen Bestwick	Benny Parsons; Wally Dallenbach Jr.	Dave Burns; Marty Snider; Matt Yocum; Bill Weber	Bill Weber	Benny Parsons
2001	October 28	Checker Auto Parts 500	Phoenix	NBC	Live	Allen Bestwick	Benny Parsons; Wally Dallenbach Jr.	Dave Burns; Marty Snider; Matt Yocum; Bill Weber	Bill Weber	Benny Parsons
2001	November 4	Pop Secret Microwave Popcorn 400	Rockingham	TNT	Live	Allen Bestwick	Benny Parsons; Wally Dallenbach Jr.	Dave Burns; Marty Snider; Matt Yocum; Bill Weber	Bill Weber	Benny Parsons
2001	November 11	Pennzoil Freedom 400	Homestead–Miami	NBC	Live	Allen Bestwick	Benny Parsons; Wally Dallenbach Jr.	Dave Burns; Marty Snider; Matt Yocum; Bill Weber	Bill Weber	Benny Parsons
2001	November 18	NAPA 500	Atlanta	NBC	Live	Allen Bestwick	Benny Parsons; Wally Dallenbach Jr.	Dave Burns; Marty Snider; Matt Yocum; Bill Weber	Bill Weber	Benny Parsons
2001	~~September 16~~; November 23	New Hampshire 300	New Hampshire	NBC	Live (Note: The 2001 New Hampshire 300 was scheduled to be on September 16th but due to the September 11 attacks the race was postponed to November 23rd.)	Allen Bestwick	Benny Parsons; Wally Dallenbach Jr.	Dave Burns; Marty Snider; Matt Yocum; Bill Weber	Bill Weber	—N/a
2001	February 10	Budweiser Shootout	Daytona	Live	TNT	Allen Bestwick	Benny Parsons; Wally Dallenbach Jr.	Dave Burns; Marty Snider; Matt Yocum; Bill Weber	Bill Weber	Benny Parsons
2001	February 14	Gatorade Twin 125s	Daytona	Live	TNT	Allen Bestwick	Benny Parsons; Wally Dallenbach Jr.	Dave Burns; Marty Snider; Matt Yocum; Bill Weber	Bill Weber	—N/a
2001	February 17	Daytona 500	Daytona	Live	NBC	Allen Bestwick	Benny Parsons; Wally Dallenbach Jr.	Dave Burns; Marty Snider; Matt Yocum; Bill Weber	Bill Weber	Benny Parsons
2001	February 24	Subway 400	Rockingham	Fox	Live	Mike Joy	Darrell Waltrip; Larry McReynolds	Dick Berggren; Steve Byrnes; Matt Yocum; Jeanne Zelasko	Chris Myers	Darrell Waltrip; Jeff Hammond
2001	March 4	UAW-Daimler Chrysler 400	Las Vegas	Fox	Live	Mike Joy	Darrell Waltrip; Larry McReynolds	Dick Berggren; Steve Byrnes; Matt Yocum; Jeanne Zelasko	Chris Myers	Darrell Waltrip; Jeff Hammond
2001	March 11	MBNA America 500	Atlanta	Fox	Live	Mike Joy	Darrell Waltrip; Larry McReynolds	Dick Berggren; Steve Byrnes; Matt Yocum; Jeanne Zelasko	Chris Myers	Darrell Waltrip; Jeff Hammond
2001	March 17	Carolina Dodge Dealers 400	Darlington	Fox	Live	Mike Joy	Darrell Waltrip; Larry McReynolds	Dick Berggren; Steve Byrnes; Matt Yocum	Chris Myers	Darrell Waltrip; Jeff Hammond
2001	March 24	Food City 500	Bristol	Fox	Live	Mike Joy	Darrell Waltrip; Larry McReynolds	Dick Berggren; Steve Byrnes; Matt Yocum	Chris Myers	Darrell Waltrip; Jeff Hammond
2001	~~April 7~~; April 8	Samsung/RadioShack 500	Texas	Fox; FX	Live (Note: The 2002 Samsung/RadioShack 500 was scheduled to be on Fox but a rain delay to Monday meant it had to be moved to FX which aired the race the following day.)	Mike Joy	Darrell Waltrip; Larry McReynolds	Dick Berggren; Steve Byrnes; Matt Yocum	~~Chris Myers~~	~~Darrell Waltrip~~; ~~Jeff Hammond~~

=== Busch/Nationwide ===
Year	Date	Event	Track	Network	Coverage	Commentary		Pit Reporters
Year	Date	Event	Track	Network	Coverage	Lap-by-lap	Color	Pit Reporters
2000	February 19	NAPA Auto Parts 300	Daytona	CBS	Live	Mike Joy	Ned Jarrett; Buddy Baker	Dick Berggren; Ralph Sheheen; Bill Stephens
2000	February 27	Alltel 200	Rockingham	TNN	Live	Mike Joy	Buddy Baker; Larry McReynolds	Glenn Jarrett; Ralph Sheheen
2000	March 4	Sam's Town 300	Las Vegas	ESPN2	Live	Jerry Punch	Benny Parsons; Kyle Petty	Bill Weber; Ray Dunlap
2000	March 11	Aaron's 312	Atlanta	ABC; ESPN2 (Note: The 2000 Aaron's 312 saw coverage move from ABC to ESPN2 due to a rain delay.)	Live	Jerry Punch	Benny Parsons	Bill Weber; Ray Dunlap
2000	March 18	SunCom 200	Darlington	ESPN	Live	Jerry Punch	Benny Parsons	Bill Weber; Ray Dunlap
2000	March 25	Cheez-It 250	Bristol	ESPN2	Live	Jerry Punch	Benny Parsons	Bill Weber; Ray Dunlap
2000	April 1	Albertsons 300	Texas	CBS	Live	Mike Joy	Ned Jarrett; Buddy Baker	Dick Berggren; Ralph Sheheen; Bill Stephens
2000	April 8	BellSouth Mobility 320	Nashville	TNN	Live	Eli Gold	Buddy Baker	Glenn Jarrett; Randy Pemberton
2000	April 15	Touchstone Energy 300	Talladega	ESPN2	Live	Jerry Punch	Benny Parsons; Ray Evernham	Bill Weber; Ray Dunlap
2000	April 29	Auto Club 300	California	ESPN	Live	Jerry Punch	Benny Parsons; Ray Evernham	Bill Weber; Ray Dunlap
2000	May 5	Hardee's 250	Richmond	ESPN2	Live	Jerry Punch	Benny Parsons	Bill Weber; Ray Dunlap
2000	May 13	Busch 200	New Hampshire	TNN	Live	Eli Gold	Buddy Baker; Dick Berggren	Glenn Jarrett; Larry McReynolds
2000	May 27	Carquest Auto Parts 300	Charlotte	TBS	Live	Allen Bestwick	Buddy Baker; Tony Stewart	Marty Snider; Mike Hogewood; Mike Massaro
2000	June 3	MBNA Platinum 200	Dover	TNN	Live	Eli Gold	Buddy Baker; Larry McReynolds	Glenn Jarrett; Ralph Sheheen
2000	June 10	Textilease/Medique 300	South Boston	TNN	Live	Eli Gold	Glenn Jarrett	Mark Garrow; Mike Hogewood
2000	June 17	Myrtle Beach 250	Myrtle Beach	TNN	Live	Mike Hogewood	Greg Sacks	Mark Garrow; Bob Dillner
2000	June 25	Lysol 200	Watkins Glen	ESPN	Live	Marty Reid	Jeremy Dale	Dave Burns; Amy East
2000	July 2	Sears DieHard 250	Milwaukee	CBS	Live	Eli Gold	Buddy Baker; Jerry Glanville	Glenn Jarrett; Steve Byrnes
2000	July 16	Econo Lodge 200	Nazareth	ESPN	Live	Jerry Punch	Benny Parsons	Bill Weber; Ray Dunlap
2000	July 22	NAPA Autocare 250	Pikes Peak	ESPN2	Live	Bob Jenkins	Benny Parsons	Jerry Punch; Ray Dunlap
2000	July 29	Carquest Auto Parts 250	Gateway	TNN	Live	Eli Gold	Buddy Baker	Glenn Jarrett; Mike Massaro
2000	August 5	Kroger 200	IRP	ESPN	Live	Marty Reid	Ned Jarrett	Dave Burns; Matt Yocum
2000	August 19	NAPAonline.com 250	Michigan	ESPN	Live	Jerry Punch	Benny Parsons	Bill Weber; Ray Dunlap
2000	August 25	Food City 250	Bristol	ESPN	Live	Jerry Punch	Benny Parsons	Bill Weber; Ray Dunlap
2000	September 2	Dura Lube / All Pro Bumper to Bumper 200	Darlington	ESPN	Live	Jerry Punch	Benny Parsons	Bill Weber; Ray Dunlap
2000	September 8	Autolite / Fram 250	Richmond	ESPN2	Live	Jerry Punch	Benny Parsons	Bill Weber; Ray Dunlap
2000	September 23	MBNA Platinum 200	Dover	TNN	Live	Ralph Sheheen	Buddy Baker; Larry McReynolds	Glenn Jarrett; Mike Hogewood
2000	October 7	All Pro Bumper to Bumper 300	Charlotte	TBS	Live	Allen Bestwick	Buddy Baker; Tony Stewart	Marty Snider; Mike Hogewood; Mike Massaro
2000	October 21	Sam's Club 200	Rockingham	TNN	Live	Ralph Sheheen	Buddy Baker; Larry McReynolds	Glenn Jarrett; Steve Byrnes
2000	October 29	Sam's Town 250	Memphis	TNN	Live	Eli Gold	Buddy Baker	Glenn Jarrett; Larry McReynolds
2000	November 4	Outback Steakhouse 200	Phoenix	TNN	Live	Ralph Sheheen	Buddy Baker; Larry McReynolds	Glenn Jarrett; Steve Byrnes
2000	November 11	Miami 300	Homestead-Miami	NBC	Live	Allen Bestwick	Benny Parsons	Marty Snider; Dave Burns

=== Trucks ===
Year	Date	Event	Track	Network	Coverage	Commentary		Pit Reporters
Year	Date	Event	Track	Network	Coverage	Lap-by-lap	Color	Pit Reporters
2000	July 1	Sears DieHard 200	Milwaukee	CBS	Live	Eli Gold	Jerry Glanville	Glenn Jarrett; Steve Byrnes
2000	July 8	thatlook.com 200	New Hampshire	CBS	Live	Mike Joy	Ned Jarrett; Buddy Baker	Dick Berggren; Ralph Sheheen
2000	July 15	Chevy Silverado 200	Nazareth	CBS	Live	Mike Joy	Ned Jarrett; Buddy Baker	Dick Berggren; Ralph Sheheen

The 2000 season also marked the final one for various networks that carried NASCAR racing. Because of the new television deal struck on December 15, 1999, it would be the last year for a multitude of these long-time broadcasters. NASCAR on CBS broadcast the final races of its twenty-two season partnership, ending with the Pepsi 400 at Daytona. NASCAR on TNN and NASCAR on TBS ended their time in the Winston Cup Series; the former's run of ten seasons came to an end at the Checker Auto Parts/Dura Lube 500 at Phoenix, while the latter's abruptly ceased at eighteen seasons following the UAW-GM Quality 500 at Lowe's Motor Speedway (TBS had initially won rights for the new deal, but were replaced by TNT). NASCAR on ESPN, alongside its affiliated programming with ESPN on ABC, ended its initial run of covering NASCAR's top series (both networks returned during the 2007 season); ESPN's first run of twenty seasons concluded with the NAPA 500 at Atlanta, while ABC's then-twenty-five nonconsecutive seasons with the sport stopped with the Brickyard 400 at Indianapolis.

- CBS also had broadcasting rights to college and NFL football, college basketball and golf, therefore scheduling conflicts prevented them to air as many races as NASCAR wanted. As a result, NASCAR's relationship with CBS, its oldest television partner, concluded at the end of the 2000 NASCAR Winston Cup Series. While the 2000 Pepsi 400 was the last Winston Cup Series race to be broadcast on CBS, their true final NASCAR race in general was the Craftsman Truck Series' Chevy Silverado 200, broadcast on July 15, 2000.
- TBS aired side-by-side coverage during commercials during the 2000 UAW-GM Quality 500 in Charlotte.
- After nearly 10 years of live coverage, as well as tape delayed coverage on American Sports Cavalcade in the 1980s, TNN's partnership with NASCAR came to a close at the conclusion of the 2000 NASCAR Winston Cup Series season, with the network's final broadcast being the Checker Auto Parts/Dura Lube 500 on November 5. TNN's final NASCAR broadcast as The Nashville Network was the 2000 MBNA.com 400 on September 24. It became The National Network the next day, and on the last couple of TNN races, the new logo was in the top right corner, instead of the transparent Nashville Network logo.
- ESPN began showing NASCAR races in 1981 with the first event being at Rockingham Speedway, which brought NASCAR to huge popularity. The last of its 265 Cup telecasts (that number includes some on ABC Sports) was the 2000 Atlanta fall race (now the Folds of Honor QuikTrip 500). ESPN and ESPN2 continued to air Craftsman Truck Series races in 2001 and 2002. After losing the rights to NASCAR Winston Cup (and Busch Series) broadcasts for the 2001 season, ESPN slowly began losing the remainder of their racing to other networks. NASCAR's Craftsman Truck Series left ESPN, also for Speed Channel in 2003. Since ESPN's reporters were no longer allowed (by NASCAR) to report from within the racetrack for RPM 2Night segments (due to their contract with Fox and NBC/TNT), the weeknight show eventually came to an end. NASCAR events would return to ESPN and ABC from 2007 to 2014, holding rights to the NASCAR Sprint Cup and Nationwide Series; these events were instead branded as NASCAR on ESPN.

Brickyard 400

- Thursday/Friday Time Trials - ESPN2 (Bob Jenkins, Benny Parsons, Dr. Jerry Punch, Bill Weber, Ray Dunlap)
- Friday "Happy Hour" Practice - ESPN (same announcers)
- Saturday Pre-race special - 1 hour on ESPN (same announcers)
- Saturday Race Day - ABC live coverage (same announcers, Brent Musburger was the WWOS studio host)
- In the starting grid for the 2001 Budweiser Shootout at Daytona International Speedway (which used 3D representations of the cars), Fox showed only the logos on the hoods of cars that had paid the network to advertise during the race. For instance, the Budweiser logo on the No. 8 car of Dale Earnhardt Jr. and Home Depot logo on the No. 20 car of Tony Stewart were shown, but Miller Lite on the No. 2 car of Rusty Wallace was not. After outcry from some of the excluded companies, full logo graphics were restored to all cars four days later for the Gatorade Twin 125s telecast. The computer-generated cars used initially on the starting grid and top-five standings when going to commercial break were phased out from main broadcast use, and were discontinued entirely in 2005 with the exception of the Daytona 500 starting grid (which featured the computer generated cars).
- From 2001 to 2006, the Daytona 500 broadcasting network alternated between Fox and NBC under the terms of a six-year, US$2.48 billion, centralized NASCAR television contract. Previously televisions rights deals for races were negotiated by the individual track owners. Beginning in 2001, the television contract would now be administered by the sanctioning body. Fox carried the Daytona 500 in odd-numbered years (2001, 2003, 2005), and NBC carried the Daytona 500 in even-numbered years (2002, 2004, 2006). The Pepsi 400 in July followed the opposite pattern, going to the network not airing the Daytona 500 in the respective season.
  - Rights to other support events held during Speedweeks followed the same general pattern, alternating between Fox/FX (odd years) and NBC/TNT (even years). Ancillary events included the Budweiser Shootout, Daytona 500 pole qualifying, the Gatorade 125s, as well as coverage of "Happy Hour" practice and other practice sessions. The Busch Series race followed the same pattern, however, the Truck Series race was aired by ESPN for two seasons as part of a different contract.
  - In 2001, after CBS lost the rights to the Daytona 500, Ken Squier left the network and joined Fox for a one-race arrangement as special contributor and studio host.
  - The 2001 Daytona 500, which was the first NASCAR points race ever telecast by Fox, also brought an unrelated controversy. At the end of that race, Fox concluded coverage shortly after Dale Earnhardt, who was fatally injured in a crash on the last lap of the race, was admitted to Halifax Health Medical Center in Daytona Beach, Florida. The network provided no updates on his condition at the time of the 5:15 p.m. Eastern Time sign-off (although no information was available at that time), and continued airing regular programming (with the animated series Futurama) at the moment Earnhardt's death was confirmed at a press conference held at 7:00 pm. Eastern Time. NASCAR's other broadcast network partner, NBC, delayed a commercial break during an NBA telecast and ESPN (which aired the Craftsman Truck Series at the time) had coverage of Earnhardt's death and the aftermath that was both earlier and much more extensive. Fox News Channel and Fox Sports Net, however, did break into programming to announce the seven-time champion's passing, with Chris Myers providing reports on FSN programs. It is possible that Fox showed an on-screen crawl on the master control feed during Futurama. In addition, local affiliates may have chosen to pre-empt the episode, with anchors delivering the news live. However, none of this has ever been verified. Shortly after the race, Hill explained to the Associated Press that the network had gone over its allotted time – as the result of an 18-car pileup on the back straightaway on lap 173 that led to the race being red-flagged for lengthy cleanup – and that continuing to cover the story would be too morbid. Producer Neil Goldberg also said Fox Sports staffers were not allowed near the crash scene. When ESPN presented a tribute feature in remembrance of the ten-year anniversary of Earnhardt's death in 2011, it showed footage of the crash and aftermath, that looked like part of the live telecast. However, it was stamped with "WFTV", the calls of the Cox-owned ABC affiliate in Orlando, Florida (Orlando and Daytona Beach share the same media market, and ABC's corporate parent The Walt Disney Company owns 80% of ESPN). How footage from Fox's NASCAR coverage got credited to the local affiliate of another network has not been made public, though it was likely that since none of the footage is similar to that of Fox's, the last lap was filmed by WFTV for their own local newscasts, intended originally as B-roll to add "color" to their post-race coverage of the Daytona 500.
  - Some fans reacted negatively to NBC's coverage, claiming that it was largely inferior to Fox in terms of both technological capabilities and bland commentators. Wally Dallenbach Jr. and Bill Weber were viewed as monotonous and boring in their delivery, compared to Larry McReynolds and Darrell Waltrip. Statistically after its first season, Fox race telecasts had more viewers than those on NBC during 2001. NBC was also criticized by fans for incorporating long commercial breaks during the race, much longer than the breaks that Fox would run during its race telecasts. Two glaring problems with the NBC coverage were that restarts were often missed due to these extended commercial breaks, that breaks during green flag runs were too frequent. Fans and media columnists used "Nothing But Commercials," as a jocular acronym for NBC's coverage. This cliché was mocked in the film Talladega Nights: The Ballad of Ricky Bobby, during a scene in which NBC is shown to take a quick commercial break during a race (with a commercial for Applebee's) when Ricky Bobby (Will Ferrell) and Jean Girard (Sacha Baron Cohen) wreck their cars in a very long-lasting crash (NBC's announcing team at the time of Weber, Dallenbach and Parsons had cameos during the scene covering the fictional race). By 2004, however, NBC had made substantial improvements in regards to both technology and commentating. Although NASCAR and NBC ended their partnership after the 2006 season, many fans hoped that they could reunite in the next television contract in spite of problems with partners ESPN and TNT.
- TNT aired its first NASCAR Winston Cup Series race under the new contract at New Hampshire International Speedway in July 2001. Both networks shared the broadcast team of Allen Bestwick, Benny Parsons, and Wally Dallenbach Jr. in the booth and Bill Weber, Marty Snider, Dave Burns, and Matt Yocum on pit road, as well both as being produced with Turner Sports' graphical look. The only differences were the placement of the network's logo on the graphics package and different colored pit reporter fire suits. TNT was treated as the secondary broadcaster, as far as broadcast rights are concerned, during its relationship with NBC because it is a cable rather than broadcast network (Turner produced all of NBC's telecasts as well). NBC's portion of broadcast included almost all of the prestigious races during their half of the year (with the exception of the Southern 500 at Darlington, the fourth leg of NASCAR's Crown Jewel, in 2001 and 2002, and the Chevy Rock & Roll 400 at Richmond from 2004 to 2006, when the race was the last race of the regular season under the season format). The idea was that ratings would most certainly be higher for NBC's coverage of a given race next to TNT's due to a broadcaster's penetration. TNT was given most of the Busch Series schedule except for major races, then covered by NBC. Night races were almost always covered by TNT except for the Pepsi 400 at Daytona, which aired on NBC in years that they had the rights to it, and (later) the UAW-GM Quality 500 at Charlotte when that race was moved from Sunday afternoons to Saturday nights. Otherwise, following the fall Richmond race, TNT's Cup Series coverage was limited to one, two or three races (including the Pop Secret Microwave Popcorn 400 at Rockingham, which they covered from 2001–2003). It was generally understood that anytime a major news story needed to be covered by NBC its NASCAR coverage would be switched over to TNT. This occurred only once: the October 7, 2001, race at Charlotte Motor Speedway was interrupted during the prerace show when President George W. Bush announced the beginning of Operation Enduring Freedom in response to the September 11, 2001 attacks. NBC covered the news until 25 laps to go (simulcast with TNT), and the entire race was shown on TNT. TNT also would broadcast any NBC-scheduled races that were postponed by rain until the following day, much like FX would do for Fox during this contract (this is no longer applicable as Fox airs rain-delayed races the following day, since Fox has no daytime programming, unlike ABC, CBS and NBC). The TNT–NBC partnership broke off when NBC chose not to bid for the NASCAR contract when it expired in 2006.

Brickyard 400

- Saturday qualifying - TNT (Allen Bestwick, Benny Parsons, Wally Dallenbach Jr., Bill Weber, Dave Burns, Marty Snider, Matt Yocum)
- Saturday "Happy Hour" Practice - CNN/SI (same announcers)
- Sunday race day - NBC (same announcers)

=== 2002 ===
Date	Event	Network	Lap-by-lap	Color commentator(s)
2/10	Budweiser Shootout (Daytona)	TNT	Allen Bestwick	Wally Dallenbach and Benny Parsons
2/14	Gatorade Twin 125's (Daytona)	TNT	Allen Bestwick	Wally Dallenbach and Benny Parsons
2/17	Daytona 500	NBC	Allen Bestwick	Wally Dallenbach and Benny Parsons
2/24	Subway 400 (Rockingham)	FOX	Mike Joy	Darrell Waltrip and Larry McReynolds
3/3	UAW-DaimlerChrysler 400 (Las Vegas)	FOX	Mike Joy	Darrell Waltrip and Larry McReynolds
3/10	MBNA America 500 (Atlanta)	FOX	Mike Joy	Darrell Waltrip and Larry McReynolds
3/17	Carolina Dodge Dealers 400 (Darlington)	FOX	Mike Joy	Darrell Waltrip and Larry McReynolds
3/24	Food City 500 (Bristol)	FOX	Mike Joy	Darrell Waltrip and Larry McReynolds
4/8	Samsung/Radioshack 500 (Texas)	FX (see note 1)	Mike Joy	Darrell Waltrip and Larry McReynolds
4/14	Virginia 500 (Martinsville)	FX	Mike Joy	Darrell Waltrip and Larry McReynolds
4/21	Aaron's 499 (Talladega)	FOX	Mike Joy	Darrell Waltrip and Larry McReynolds
4/28	NAPA Auto Parts 500 (California)	FOX	Mike Joy	Darrell Waltrip and Larry McReynolds
5/5	Pontiac Excitement 400 (Richmond)	FX	Mike Joy	Darrell Waltrip and Larry McReynolds
5/12	The Winston (Charlotte)	FX	Mike Joy	Darrell Waltrip and Larry McReynolds
5/26	Coca-Cola Racing Family 600 (Charlotte)	FOX	Mike Joy	Darrell Waltrip and Larry McReynolds
6/4	MBNA Platinum 400 (Dover)	FX	Mike Joy	Darrell Waltrip and Larry McReynolds
6/12	Pocono 500 (Pocono)	FOX	Mike Joy	Darrell Waltrip and Larry McReynolds
6/19	Sirius Satellite Radio 400 (Michigan)	FOX	Mike Joy	Darrell Waltrip and Larry McReynolds
6/26	Dodge/Save Mart 350 (Infineon)	FOX	Mike Joy	Darrell Waltrip and Larry McReynolds
7/6	Pepsi 400 (Daytona)	FOX	Mike Joy	Darrell Waltrip and Larry McReynolds
7/14	Tropicana 400 (Chicago)	NBC	Allen Bestwick	Wally Dallenbach and Benny Parsons
7/21	New England 300 (New Hampshire)	TNT	Allen Bestwick	Wally Dallenbach and Benny Parsons
7/28	Pennsylvania 500 (Pocono)	TNT	Allen Bestwick	Wally Dallenbach and Benny Parsons
8/4	Brickyard 400 (Indianapolis)	NBC	Allen Bestwick	Wally Dallenbach and Benny Parsons
8/11	Global Crossing @ the Glen (Watkins Glen)	NBC	Allen Bestwick	Wally Dallenbach and Benny Parsons
8/18	Pepsi 400 by Meijer (Michigan)	TNT	Allen Bestwick	Wally Dallenbach and Benny Parsons
8/24	Sharpie 500 (Bristol)	TNT	Allen Bestwick	Wally Dallenbach and Benny Parsons
9/1	Mountain Dew Southern 500 (Darlington)	TNT	Allen Bestwick	Wally Dallenbach and Benny Parsons
9/7	Chevrolet Monte Carlo 400 (Richmond)	TNT	Allen Bestwick	Wally Dallenbach and Benny Parsons
9/15	New Hampshire 300	NBC	Allen Bestwick	Wally Dallenbach and Benny Parsons
9/22	MBNA All-American Heroes 400 (Dover)	TNT	Allen Bestwick	Wally Dallenbach and Benny Parsons
9/29	Protection One 400 (Kansas)	NBC	Allen Bestwick	Wally Dallenbach and Benny Parsons
10/6	EA Sports 500 (Talladega)	NBC	Allen Bestwick	Wally Dallenbach and Benny Parsons
10/13	UAW-GM Quality 500 (Charlotte)	NBC	Allen Bestwick	Wally Dallenbach and Benny Parsons
10/20	Old Dominion 500 (Martinsville)	NBC	Allen Bestwick	Wally Dallenbach and Benny Parsons
10/27	NAPA 500 (Atlanta)	NBC	Allen Bestwick	Wally Dallenbach and Benny Parsons
11/3	Pop Secret 400 (Rockingham)	TNT	Allen Bestwick	Wally Dallenbach and Benny Parsons
11/10	Checker Auto Parts 500 (Phoenix)	NBC	Allen Bestwick	Wally Dallenbach and Benny Parsons
11/17	Ford 400 (Homestead)	NBC	Allen Bestwick	Wally Dallenbach and Benny Parsons

==== Notes ====
1- Postponed from 4/7 and moved from FOX to FX due to rain.

Brickyard 400

- Saturday qualifying - TNT (Allen Bestwick, Benny Parsons, Wally Dallenbach Jr., Bill Weber, Dave Burns, Marty Snider, Matt Yocum)
- Saturday "Happy Hour" Practice - SPEED (same announcers)
- Sunday race day - NBC (same announcers)

=== 2003 ===
Date	Event	Network	Lap-by-lap	Color commentator(s)
2/8	Budweiser Shootout (Daytona)	FOX	Mike Joy	Darrell Waltrip and Larry McReynolds
2/13	Gatorade Twin 125's (Daytona)	FX	Mike Joy	Darrell Waltrip and Larry McReynolds
2/16	Daytona 500	FOX	Mike Joy	Darrell Waltrip and Larry McReynolds
2/23	Subway 400 (Rockingham)	FOX	Mike Joy	Darrell Waltrip and Larry McReynolds
3/3	UAW-Daimler Chrysler 400 (Las Vegas)	FOX	Mike Joy	Darrell Waltrip and Larry McReynolds
3/9	Bass Pro Shops MBNA 500 (Atlanta)	FOX	Mike Joy	Darrell Waltrip and Larry McReynolds
3/16	Carolina Dodge Dealers 400 (Darlington)	FOX	Mike Joy	Darrell Waltrip and Larry McReynolds
3/23	Food City 500 (Bristol)	FOX	Mike Joy	Darrell Waltrip and Larry McReynolds
3/30	Samsung/Radio Shack 500 (Texas)	FOX	Mike Joy	Darrell Waltrip and Larry McReynolds
4/6	Aaron's 499 (Talladega)	FOX	Mike Joy	Darrell Waltrip and Larry McReynolds
4/13	Virginia 500 (Martinsville)	FOX	Mike Joy	Darrell Waltrip and Larry McReynolds
4/27	Auto Club 500 (California)	FOX	Mike Joy	Darrell Waltrip and Larry McReynolds
5/3	Pontiac Excitement 400 (Richmond)	FX	Mike Joy	Darrell Waltrip and Larry McReynolds
5/17	The Winston (Charlotte)	FX	Mike Joy	Darrell Waltrip and Larry McReynolds
5/25	Coca-Cola 600 (Charlotte)	FOX	Mike Joy	Darrell Waltrip and Larry McReynolds
6/1	MBNA Armed Forces Family 400 (Dover)	FX	Mike Joy	Darrell Waltrip and Larry McReynolds
6/8	Pocono 500	FOX	Mike Joy	Darrell Waltrip and Larry McReynolds
6/15	Sirius 400 (Michigan)	FOX	Mike Joy	Darrell Waltrip and Larry McReynolds
6/22	Dodge/Save Mart 350 (Sears Point)	FOX	Mike Joy	Darrell Waltrip and Larry McReynolds
7/5	Pepsi 400 (Daytona)	NBC	Allen Bestwick	Wally Dallenbach and Benny Parsons
7/13	Tropicana 400 (Chicago)	NBC	Allen Bestwick	Wally Dallenbach and Benny Parsons
7/20	New England 300 (New Hampshire)	TNT	Allen Bestwick	Wally Dallenbach and Benny Parsons
7/27	Pennsylvania 500 (Pocono)	TNT	Allen Bestwick	Wally Dallenbach and Benny Parsons
8/3	Brickyard 400 (Indianapolis)	NBC	Allen Bestwick	Wally Dallenbach and Benny Parsons
8/10	Sirius Satellite Radio @ the Glen (Watkins Glen)	NBC	Allen Bestwick	Wally Dallenbach and Benny Parsons
8/17	GFS Marketplace 400 (Michigan)	TNT	Allen Bestwick	Wally Dallenbach and Benny Parsons
8/23	Sharpie 500 (Bristol)	TNT	Allen Bestwick	Wally Dallenbach and Benny Parsons
8/31	Mountain Dew Southern 500 (Darlington)	NBC	Allen Bestwick	Wally Dallenbach and Benny Parsons
9/6	Chevy Rock & Roll 400 (Richmond)	TNT	Allen Bestwick	Wally Dallenbach and Benny Parsons
9/14	Sylvania 300 (New Hampshire)	TNT	Allen Bestwick	Wally Dallenbach and Benny Parsons
9/21	MBNA America 400 (Dover)	NBC	Allen Bestwick	Wally Dallenbach and Benny Parsons
9/28	EA Sports 500 (Talladega)	NBC	Allen Bestwick	Wally Dallenbach and Benny Parsons
10/5	Banquet 400 (Kansas)	NBC	Allen Bestwick	Wally Dallenbach and Benny Parsons
10/11	UAW-GM Quality 500 (Charlotte)	NBC	Allen Bestwick	Wally Dallenbach and Benny Parsons
10/19	Subway 500 (Martinsville)	NBC	Allen Bestwick	Wally Dallenbach and Benny Parsons
10/26-27	Bass Pro Shops MBNA 500 (Atlanta)	NBC/TNT (see note 1)	Allen Bestwick	Wally Dallenbach and Benny Parsons
11/2	Checker Auto Parts 500 (Phoenix)	NBC	Allen Bestwick	Wally Dallenbach and Benny Parsons
11/9	Pop Secret Microwave Popcorn 400 (Rockingham)	TNT	Allen Bestwick	Wally Dallenbach and Benny Parsons
11/16	Ford 400 (Homestead)	NBC	Allen Bestwick	Wally Dallenbach and Benny Parsons

==== Notes ====
1- Rain delayed the remainder of the race until Monday, coverage was bumped to TNT.

=== 2004 ===
Date	Event	Network	Lap-by-lap	Color commentator(s)
2/7	Budweiser Shootout (Daytona)	TNT	Allen Bestwick	Wally Dallenbach and Benny Parsons
2/12	Gatorade Twin 125's (Daytona)	TNT	Allen Bestwick	Wally Dallenbach and Benny Parsons
2/15	Daytona 500	NBC	Allen Bestwick	Wally Dallenbach and Benny Parsons
2/22	Subway 400 (Rockingham)	FOX	Mike Joy	Darrell Waltrip and Larry McReynolds
3/7	UAW-Daimler Chrysler 400 (Las Vegas)	FOX	Mike Joy	Darrell Waltrip and Larry McReynolds
3/14	Golden Corral 500 (Atlanta)	FOX	Mike Joy	Darrell Waltrip and Larry McReynolds
3/21	Carolina Dodge Dealers 400 (Darlington)	FOX	Mike Joy	Darrell Waltrip and Larry McReynolds
3/28	Food City 500 (Bristol)	FOX	Mike Joy	Darrell Waltrip and Larry McReynolds
4/4	Samsung/Radio Shack 500 (Texas)	FOX	Mike Joy	Darrell Waltrip and Larry McReynolds
4/18	Advance Auto Parts 500 (Martinsville)	FOX	Mike Joy	Darrell Waltrip and Larry McReynolds
4/25	Aaron's 499 (Talladega)	FOX	Mike Joy	Darrell Waltrip and Larry McReynolds
5/2	Auto Club 500 (California)	FOX	Mike Joy	Darrell Waltrip and Larry McReynolds
5/15	Chevy American Revolution 400 (Richmond)	FX	Mike Joy	Darrell Waltrip and Larry McReynolds
5/22	Nextel All Star Race (Charlotte)	FX	Mike Joy	Darrell Waltrip and Larry McReynolds
5/30	Coca-Cola 600 (Charlotte)	FOX	Mike Joy	Darrell Waltrip and Larry McReynolds
6/6	MBNA 400: A Salute to Heroes (Dover)	FX	Mike Joy	Darrell Waltrip and Larry McReynolds
6/13	Pocono 500	FOX	Mike Joy	Darrell Waltrip and Larry McReynolds
6/20	DHL 400 (Michigan)	FOX	Mike Joy	Darrell Waltrip and Larry McReynolds
6/27	Dodge/Save Mart 350 (Sears Point)	FOX	Mike Joy	Darrell Waltrip and Larry McReynolds
7/3	Pepsi 400 (Daytona)	FOX	Mike Joy	Darrell Waltrip and Larry McReynolds
7/11	Tropicana 400 (Chicago)	NBC	Allen Bestwick	Wally Dallenbach and Benny Parsons
7/25	Siemens 300 (New Hampshire)	TNT	Allen Bestwick	Wally Dallenbach and Benny Parsons
8/1	Pennsylvania 500 (Pocono)	TNT	Allen Bestwick	Wally Dallenbach and Benny Parsons
8/8	Brickyard 400 (Indianapolis)	NBC	Allen Bestwick	Wally Dallenbach and Benny Parsons
8/15	Sirius Satellite Radio @ the Glen (Watkins Glen)	TNT	Allen Bestwick	Wally Dallenbach and Benny Parsons
8/22	GFS Marketplace 400 (Michigan)	TNT	Allen Bestwick	Wally Dallenbach and Benny Parsons
8/28	Sharpie 500 (Bristol)	TNT	Allen Bestwick	Wally Dallenbach and Benny Parsons
9/5	Pop Secret 500 (California)	NBC	Allen Bestwick	Wally Dallenbach and Benny Parsons
9/11	Chevy Rock & Roll 400 (Richmond)	TNT	Allen Bestwick	Wally Dallenbach and Benny Parsons
9/19	Sylvania 300 (New Hampshire)	TNT	Allen Bestwick	Wally Dallenbach and Benny Parsons
9/26	MBNA America 400 (Dover)	TNT	Allen Bestwick	Wally Dallenbach and Benny Parsons
10/3	EA Sports 500 (Talladega)	NBC	Bill Weber	Wally Dallenbach and Benny Parsons
10/10	Banquet 400 (Kansas)	NBC	Bill Weber	Wally Dallenbach and Benny Parsons
10/16	UAW-GM Quality 500 (Charlotte)	NBC	Allen Bestwick	Wally Dallenbach and Benny Parsons
10/24	Subway 500 (Martinsville)	NBC	Allen Bestwick	Wally Dallenbach and Benny Parsons
10/31	Bass Pro Shops MBNA 500 (Atlanta)	NBC	Allen Bestwick	Wally Dallenbach and Benny Parsons
11/7	Checker Auto Parts 500 (Phoenix)	NBC	Allen Bestwick	Wally Dallenbach and Benny Parsons
11/14	Mountain Dew Southern 500 (Darlington)	NBC	Allen Bestwick	Wally Dallenbach and Benny Parsons
11/21	Ford 400 (Homestead)	NBC	Allen Bestwick	Wally Dallenbach and Benny Parsons

=== 2005 ===
Date	Event	Network	Lap-by-lap	Color commentator(s)
2/12	Budweiser Shootout (Daytona)	FOX	Mike Joy	Darrell Waltrip and Larry McReynolds
2/17	Gatorade Duels (Daytona)	FX	Mike Joy	Darrell Waltrip and Larry McReynolds
2/20	Daytona 500	FOX	Mike Joy	Darrell Waltrip and Larry McReynolds
2/27	Auto Club 500 (California)	FOX	Mike Joy	Darrell Waltrip and Larry McReynolds
3/13	UAW-Daimler Chrysler 400 (Las Vegas)	FOX	Mike Joy	Darrell Waltrip and Larry McReynolds
3/20	Golden Corral 500 (Atlanta)	FOX	Mike Joy	Darrell Waltrip and Larry McReynolds
4/3	Food City 500 (Bristol)	FOX	Mike Joy	Darrell Waltrip and Larry McReynolds
4/10	Samsung Radioshack 500 (Texas)	FOX	Mike Joy	Darrell Waltrip and Larry McReynolds
4/17	Advance Auto Parts 500 (Martinsville)	FOX	Mike Joy	Darrell Waltrip and Larry McReynolds
4/23	Subway Fresh 500 (Phoenix)	FOX	Mike Joy	Darrell Waltrip and Larry McReynolds
5/1	Aaron's 499 (Talladega)	FOX	Mike Joy	Darrell Waltrip and Larry McReynolds
5/7	Dodge Charger 500 (Darlington)	FOX	Mike Joy	Darrell Waltrip and Larry McReynolds
5/14	Chevy American Revolution 400 (Richmond)	FX	Mike Joy	Darrell Waltrip and Larry McReynolds
5/21	Nextel All Star Race (Charlotte)	FX	Mike Joy	Darrell Waltrip and Larry McReynolds
5/29	Coca-Cola 600 (Charlotte)	FOX	Mike Joy	Darrell Waltrip and Larry McReynolds
6/5	MBNA RacePoints 400 (Dover)	FX	Mike Joy	Darrell Waltrip and Larry McReynolds
6/12	Pocono 500	FOX	Mike Joy	Darrell Waltrip and Larry McReynolds
6/19	Batman Begins 400 (Michigan)	FOX	Mike Joy	Darrell Waltrip and Larry McReynolds
6/26	Dodge/Save Mart 350 (Sears Point)	FOX	Mike Joy	Darrell Waltrip and Larry McReynolds
7/2	Pepsi 400 (Daytona)	NBC	Bill Weber	Wally Dallenbach and Benny Parsons
7/10	USG Sheetrock 400 (Chicago)	NBC	Bill Weber	Wally Dallenbach and Benny Parsons
7/17	New England 300 (New Hampshire)	TNT	Bill Weber	Wally Dallenbach and Benny Parsons
7/24	Pennsylvania 500 (Pocono)	TNT	Bill Weber	Wally Dallenbach and Benny Parsons
8/7	Brickyard 400 (Indianapolis)	NBC	Bill Weber	Wally Dallenbach and Benny Parsons
8/14	Sirius Satellite Radio @ the Glen (Watkins Glen)	NBC	Bill Weber	Wally Dallenbach and Benny Parsons
8/21	GFS Marketplace 400 (Michigan)	TNT	Bill Weber	Wally Dallenbach and Benny Parsons
8/28	Sharpie 500 (Bristol)	TNT	Bill Weber	Wally Dallenbach and Benny Parsons
9/4	Sony HD 500 (California)	NBC	Bill Weber	Wally Dallenbach and Benny Parsons
9/10	Chevy Rock & Roll 400 (Richmond)	TNT	Bill Weber	Wally Dallenbach and Benny Parsons
9/18	Sylvania 300 (New Hampshire)	TNT	Bill Weber	Wally Dallenbach and Benny Parsons
9/25	MBNA NASCAR RacePoints 400 (Dover)	TNT	Bill Weber	Wally Dallenbach and Benny Parsons
10/2	UAW-Ford 500 (Talladega)	NBC	Bill Weber	Wally Dallenbach and Benny Parsons
10/9	Banquet 400 (Kansas)	NBC	Bill Weber	Wally Dallenbach and Benny Parsons
10/15	UAW-GM Quality 500 (Charlotte)	NBC	Bill Weber	Wally Dallenbach and Benny Parsons
10/23	Subway 500 (Martinsville)	NBC	Bill Weber	Wally Dallenbach and Benny Parsons
10/30	Bass Pro Shops MBNA 500 (Atlanta)	NBC	Bill Weber	Wally Dallenbach and Benny Parsons
11/6	Dickies 500 (Texas)	NBC	Bill Weber	Wally Dallenbach and Benny Parsons
11/13	Checker Auto Parts 500 (Phoenix)	NBC	Bill Weber	Wally Dallenbach and Benny Parsons
11/20	Ford 400 (Homestead)	NBC	Bill Weber	Wally Dallenbach and Benny Parsons

Brickyard 400

- Saturday qualifying - TNT (Bill Weber, Benny Parsons, Wally Dallenbach Jr., Allen Bestwick, Dave Burns, Marty Snider, Matt Yocum)
- Saturday "Happy Hour" Practice - SPEED (same announcers)
- Sunday race day - NBC (same announcers)

=== 2006 ===
Event	Network	Lap-by-lap	Color commentator(s)
Budweiser Shootout (Daytona)	TNT	Bill Weber	Wally Dallenbach and Benny Parsons
Gatorade Duels (Daytona)	TNT	Bill Weber	Wally Dallenbach and Benny Parsons
Daytona 500	NBC	Bill Weber	Wally Dallenbach and Benny Parsons
Auto Club 500 (California)	FOX	Mike Joy	Darrell Waltrip and Larry McReynolds
UAW-Daimler Chrysler 400 (Las Vegas)	FOX	Mike Joy	Darrell Waltrip and Larry McReynolds
Golden Corral 500 (Atlanta)	FX (run on Monday; was to be on FOX)	Mike Joy	Darrell Waltrip and Larry McReynolds
Food City 500 (Bristol)	FOX	Mike Joy	Darrell Waltrip and Larry McReynolds
DirecTV 500 (Martinsville)	FOX	Mike Joy	Darrell Waltrip and Larry McReynolds
Samsung Radioshack 500 (Texas)	FOX	Mike Joy	Darrell Waltrip and Larry McReynolds
Subway Fresh 500 (Phoenix)	FOX	Mike Joy	Darrell Waltrip and Larry McReynolds
Aaron's 499 (Talladega)	FX (run on Monday; was to be on FOX)	Mike Joy	Darrell Waltrip and Larry McReynolds
Dodge Charger 500 (Darlington)	FOX	Mike Joy	Darrell Waltrip and Larry McReynolds
Crown Royal 400 (Richmond)	FX	Mike Joy	Darrell Waltrip and Larry McReynolds
The Nextel All Star Race (Charlotte)	FX	Mike Joy	Darrell Waltrip and Larry McReynolds
Coca-Cola 600 (Charlotte)	FOX	Mike Joy	Darrell Waltrip and Larry McReynolds
Neighborhood Excellence 400 (Dover)	FX	Mike Joy	Darrell Waltrip and Larry McReynolds
Pocono 500 (Pocono)	FOX	Mike Joy	Darrell Waltrip and Larry McReynolds
3M Performance 400 (Michigan)	FOX	Mike Joy	Darrell Waltrip and Larry McReynolds
Dodge/Save Mart 350 (Sears Point)	FOX	Mike Joy	Darrell Waltrip and Larry McReynolds
Pepsi 400 (Daytona)	FOX	Mike Joy	Darrell Waltrip and Larry McReynolds
USG Sheetrock 400 (Chicago)	TNT	Bill Weber	Wally Dallenbach and Benny Parsons
Lenox Industrial Tools 300 (New Hampshire)	TNT	Bill Weber	Wally Dallenbach and Benny Parsons
Pennsylvania 500 (Pocono)	TNT	Bill Weber	Wally Dallenbach and Benny Parsons
Allstate 400 @ The Brickyard (Indianapolis)	NBC	Bill Weber	Wally Dallenbach and Benny Parsons
AMD @ the Glen (Watkins Glen)	NBC	Bill Weber	Wally Dallenbach and Benny Parsons
GFS Marketplace 400 (Michigan)	TNT	Bill Weber	Wally Dallenbach
Sharpie 500 (Bristol)	TNT	Bill Weber	Wally Dallenbach and Benny Parsons
Sony HD 500 (California)	NBC	Bill Weber	Wally Dallenbach
Chevy Rock & Roll 400 (Richmond)	TNT	Bill Weber	Wally Dallenbach and Benny Parsons
Sylvania 300 (New Hampshire)	TNT	Bill Weber	Wally Dallenbach
Dover 400	TNT	Bill Weber	Wally Dallenbach and Benny Parsons
UAW-Ford 500 (Talladega)	NBC	Bill Weber	Wally Dallenbach and Benny Parsons
Banquet 400 (Kansas)	NBC	Bill Weber	Wally Dallenbach
Bank of America 500 (Charlotte)	NBC	Bill Weber	Wally Dallenbach and Benny Parsons
Subway 500 (Martinsville)	NBC	Bill Weber	Wally Dallenbach and Benny Parsons
Bass Pro Shops MBNA 500 (Atlanta)	NBC	Bill Weber	Wally Dallenbach and Benny Parsons
Dickies 500 (Texas)	NBC	Bill Weber	Wally Dallenbach and Benny Parsons
Checker Auto Parts 500 (Phoenix)	NBC	Bill Weber	Wally Dallenbach and Benny Parsons
Ford 400 (Homestead-Miami)	NBC	Bill Weber	Wally Dallenbach and Benny Parsons

- In October 2005, NBC announced that it might not renew its contract end of the NASCAR contract after the 2006 season, largely because of its acquisition of the Sunday Night Football telecast from ESPN. The restructured broadcast deal awarded Fox the rights to the Daytona 500 from 2007 until 2014. The contract also allowed ESPN and ABC to regain NASCAR rights, taking the second half of the season's races; meanwhile, TNT retained its broadcast rights and signed a contract to air six mid-season races. The ESPN family of networks became the exclusive home of the NASCAR Busch/Nationwide Series as part of the contract, replacing TNT, NBC, Fox and FX as broadcasters. As the NFL and NASCAR contracts overlapped during the 2006 Chase for the Nextel Cup, some of NBC's post-race shows were moved to CNBC in order to allow the broadcast network's NFL pre-game show Football Night in America to start on time.

=== 2007 ===
The 2007 season was the start of a new television package. The contracts are for eight seasons, running until 2014. NBC and FX both egressed after the 2006 season, and ESPN and ABC have returned after a six-year absence, with ESPN last broadcasting the series' NAPA 500 from Atlanta in November 2000, and ABC telecasting the Brickyard 400 in August of that same year.

Fox carried the first part of the season beginning with Speedweeks at Daytona, and continued coverage up through the June race held at the Dover International Speedway, with Fox-owned Speed Channel carrying the Gatorade Duel at Daytona qualifying races and the Nextel All-Star Challenge/Nextel Open doubleheader. Mike Joy, Larry McReynolds, and Darrell Waltrip returned to the broadcast booth for Fox. Fox also planned to carry two Craftsman Truck Series races March 31 and May 26, with Speed carrying the remainder of the series. The March 31 race at Martinsville was shown successfully on Fox, but the telecast for the May 26 race at Mansfield, OH was moved to Speed Channel after lap 50 due to rain delays.

TNT covered six mid-season races in June and July dubbed the "NASCAR Summer Series" including the Pepsi 400. The commentators included announcers Bill Weber and Wally Dallenbach Jr. Kyle Petty replaced the late and great Benny Parsons, and also drove and did commentary from his car during the June 24 race at Sonoma, which turned out at the outset of the race to be rather embarrassing as he uttered "fuck" in a replay of how he was involved in an accident. Petty is driving a part-time schedule in 2007, as Chad McCumbee took over Petty's No. 45 car in the June Pocono race, and John Andretti, who drove the No. 43 car for Petty Enterprises, and won a race with them at Martinsville in 1999, is driving in the remaining races except for Sonoma. TNT used Hinder's cover of the Steppenwolf classic rock anthem "Born to Be Wild" as part of their race broadcast.

  - TNT, however, elected to make a bid for rights in the new television contract and was successful in retaining its coverage, joining Fox and the ESPN family of networks in a contract that ran until 2014. Under the terms of said contract TNT gained broadcast rights to six June and July races, which it calls the NASCAR on TNT Summer Series. TNT's six races in 2014 were the Pocono 400 at Pocono Raceway, the Quicken Loans 400 at Michigan International Speedway, the Toyota/Save Mart 350 at Sonoma Raceway, the Quaker State 400 at Kentucky Speedway, the annual July 4 weekend Coke Zero 400 at Daytona International Speedway, and the Camping World RV Sales 301 at New Hampshire Motor Speedway. Unlike in the previous contract TNT was not able to procure rights to any Nationwide Series races, as ESPN successfully bid to be the exclusive carrier of the series. However, TNT became the exclusive home for the Coke Zero 400, much like Fox had become exclusive home for the Daytona 500 — in the previous contract, Fox and NBC alternated coverage of the two races at Daytona, with Fox airing the Daytona 500 and NBC the Pepsi 400 in odd-numbered years, and vice versa in even-numbered years.
  - Bill Weber stayed on as TNT's NASCAR voice and Wally Dallenbach Jr. was retained to be his color commentator. Originally, Benny Parsons was to join the two in the booth, but he died from lung cancer prior to the beginning of the 2007 season. Kyle Petty elected to take time off from his driving duties to take the position in the broadcast booth. Marty Snider and Matt Yocum returned as pit reporters. To replace Allen Bestwick and Dave Burns, both of whom went to ESPN following the 2006 season, TNT promoted Ralph Sheheen and Lindsay Czarniak to full-time pit reporter positions; previously both of them served as substitutes or for stand-alone Busch Series races that conflicted with the Cup Series schedule. To round out the coverage, Larry McReynolds was loaned by Fox to provide analysis and explanations.

ESPN and ABC carried all races beginning with the Allstate 400 at the Brickyard in late July on ESPN running up through the Labor Day weekend race at California and ABC picking up their part of the package with the final pre-chase race at Richmond and the entire Chase for the Nextel Cup. Jerry Punch served as the play-by-play and Rusty Wallace and Andy Petree served as color commentators. Punch last worked for the network as a pit reporter on IRL events such as the Indianapolis 500, and has also filled in on the play-by-play of NASCAR races prior to 2001, mostly during coverage of NASCAR Busch Series races, which ESPN2 and ABC carried full-time starting in 2007. Wallace is the 1989 NASCAR Winston Cup Series champion. They were joined by newcomer Andy Petree, a former team owner and Dale Earnhardt's crew chief in 1993 and 1994. Brent Musburger and Suzy Kolber served as the hosts on both ESPN and ABC. Rock group Aerosmith kicked off each broadcast with a live version of their big 1970s FM hit "Back in the Saddle" that was filmed in concert in Las Vegas.

- In 2007, 29 of the 35 Busch races aired on ESPN2, with the other five airing on ABC. ESPN2 started its coverage with the Orbitz 300 at Daytona International Speedway on February 17, 2007. ABC's first race was the Sam's Town 300 at Las Vegas on March 10. The first NEXTEL Cup race telecast was the Brickyard 400 on July 29 on ESPN. The next 5 races aired on ESPN and the Richmond race and the final 10 races (the Chase for the Nextel Cup) appeared on ABC. The initial broadcast team consisted of Jerry Punch as the lead announcer with Wallace and Andy Petree as analysts. Allen Bestwick, Mike Massaro, Jamie Little, and Dave Burns were the pit reporters. Brent Musburger, Suzy Kolber, and Chris Fowler contributed as studio hosts.
  - In 2008, ESPN moved Wallace and Bestwick from their positions. Bestwick became studio host while Wallace joined the studio team. Dale Jarrett, who had retired during the 2008 season and had worked part-time for the network afterward, joined Punch and Petree as booth analyst. Shannon Spake replaced Bestwick on pit road.
  - In 2009, the Monday edition of NASCAR Now became a roundtable show, similar to the old Inside NEXTEL Cup show that was on Speed Channel. Bestwick hosts the roundtable; he is also the former host of the Speed Channel program. The panelists rotate and have included Mike Massaro, Johnny Benson, Boris Said, Ray Evernham, and Ricky Craven. Massaro has also filled in as host, including after the 2010 Daytona 500. Beginning with the 2010 season, ESPN carried fourteen of the seventeen races, including the entire Chase for the Sprint Cup except for the Bank of America 500 which continued to be televised on ABC. ABC acquired the Irwin Tools Night Race and kept the Air Guard 400 as part of its race coverage. Previously, ABC aired the entire Chase for the Sprint Cup and the Richmond race (now known as the Federated Auto Parts 400), but NASCAR's decision to standardize early start times conflicted with ABC's expanding Sunday morning political talk show lineup. This led to consternation among ABC's Southern affiliates, who counted on the races as a bulwark against NFL games on competing CBS and Fox stations. This decision was in-line with ESPN taking over the rights to the Rose Bowl and the British Open as part of an ongoing strategy to shift sports programming from ABC to ESPN, to the outrage of many sports fans.

=== 2008 ===
The 2008 season marked the second year of television contracts with Fox, TNT and ESPN/ABC. The biggest changes involved ESPN and ABC, as Dale Jarrett became the network's lead race color commentator and Rusty Wallace became the pre-race analyst. Dale, who completed his driving career with the Sprint All-Star Race XXIV, followed in the footsteps of his father, Ned, who worked with ESPN through most of the 1980s through the 2000 NASCAR season. Allen Bestwick took over the hosting role for all races as well as some editions of ESPN2's NASCAR Now, replacing Brent Musburger and Suzy Kolber on the pre-race show, with Shannon Spake taking Bestwick's place as pit reporter. Also, veteran NASCAR reporter Nicole Briscoe (along with Ryan Burr) took over as a part-time host of NASCAR Now show for Erik Kuselias. No major changes were made by Fox and TNT for the 2008 season.

One innovation was Fox's "Gopher Cam", placed below the track near the inside of the turns for a unique perspective. In the need for a name for their new mascot, Fox turned to internet users and even drivers for suggestions, and the gopher cam mascot was named "Digger". "Digger" is now emblazoned on T-shirts, hats and even as a plush toy.

- After limited usage in 2007, the network introduced the "Gopher Cam" full-time in 2008, a camera angle from the bottom banking of a track's turn. Fox implied that it invented the technology. However, it was quickly brought to light that Terry Lingner of ESPN, along with engineer James Fishman, had developed the technology 15 years earlier under the name "Tread Cam". However, it should be known that the devices are completely different.
- "Digger," a CGI-animated gopher character that was voiced by Eric Bauza, began as a symbol of the corner camera and was later adopted as an unofficial mascot for Fox's NASCAR coverage. Beginning with the 2009 Daytona 500, Digger was extended into a series of short cartoons that aired during the pre-race show; country music superstar Keith Urban recorded the theme song for these shorts. Storylines revolved around Digger and his life beneath the infield of a fictional racetrack. Other characters include his girlfriend Annie and the track's security chief, Lumpy Wheels (respectively named after the daughter of Fox Sports president David Hill, and former track promoter Humpy Wheeler). Digger's souvenir trailer at the tracks attracted sizeable crowds of families with young children. However, the cartoon segment drew wide opposition from regular viewers of the broadcasts. After a NASCAR town hall-style meeting at the end of May 2009, Fox Sports chair David Hill reported receiving an email from a high-ranking NASCAR official whose identity he chose to conceal, stating that Digger could have been the cause of ratings declines for Fox's NASCAR coverage. Hill said "It was because of Digger that people were turning off in droves because they couldn't stand it, I said, I'm so sorry. If I'd known, I never would have created him. I didn't realize how insidious he was. It's the biggest crock of shit I've ever heard." Among the reasons of criticism is the purpose of the character's usage. Though it was at one time commonplace for networks to create mascots for sports coverage to incorporate an educational and entertaining element into their coverage, which was the case with Peter Puck, Digger was created purely to add entertainment to the broadcast and reach out to a younger audience. Some NASCAR fans accused Fox of dumbing down and fluffing its coverage in order to gain revenue from Digger merchandise sales. Despite continuous outrage from the NASCAR fan community, as well as talk from the NASCAR community that the Fan Council was not pleased with the situation, Fox did not announce any plans to drop the usage of the characters, and even had posted pictures of holiday-themed versions of the Digger die-cast in 2009 and 2010. In response to the comments, in 2010, the Digger cartoon was not shown during pre-race shows and Digger appeared less often at the bottom of the screen. Throughout the 2011 season as well as the 2012 Budweiser Shootout and Daytona 500, Digger appeared very sparingly, usually only during commercial bumpers. As of the 2012 Subway Fresh Fit 500, all appearances and references to Digger were dropped entirely from Fox's NASCAR broadcasts. However, nods to it occasionally came up (for example, at the Talladega race in 2014, when Carl Edwards showed debris on his firesuit, Mike Joy commented that he hoped that nothing had happened to Digger, to which Darrell Waltrip responded, "Digger's retired"). Digger made a cameo appearance in the 2009 20th Century Studios film Alvin and the Chipmunks: The Squeakquel. He also made an appearance in the Fox NFL Sunday introduction during the December 20, 2009 broadcast, in which the Chipmunks also made an appearance (20th Century Fox was then a corporate sister to the Fox network through 21st Century Fox, known at the time as News Corporation).

Another innovation was TNT's "RaceBuddy", an internet application that showed multiple views of the race and radio feeds from drivers (using NASCAR.com's RaceDay Scanner).

=== 2009 ===
In their third year of the current NASCAR television agreement, Fox carried the Bud Shootout, the Daytona 500 and the first 13 races through Dover's June race. Fox-owned Speed Channel aired the Gatorade Duels and Sprint All Star Race XXV. TNT then picked up the next six races starting at Pocono including the summer race at Daytona, the Coke Zero 400 with its "wide open format" coverage and ending at Chicago. The Brickyard 400 started ESPN/ABC's coverage, including the entire Chase for the Sprint Cup on ABC.

New to Fox telecasts was 3-D CGI animated adventures of "Digger", the network's gopher cam mascot and his friends, Annie, Marbles, Grandpa and rival Lumpy Wheels (named after former Charlotte Motor Speedway chief Humpy Wheeler). According to Digger's backstory, created by Fox Sports chairman David Hill, Digger lives underground at Talladega Superspeedway. The characters were also used in segues into and out of commercial breaks. However, Digger later became a harbor of criticism, as well as what most have cited as a cause of a deeper ratings decline than in years past, adding to already lower-than-normal ratings.

Hours before the July New Hampshire race on TNT, Bill Weber was removed from the broadcast booth and replaced by Ralph Sheheen for undisclosed personal reasons. TNT and NASCAR announced on July 1 that Sheheen would replace Weber for the final two races on TNT at Daytona and Chicagoland.

The annual changes at ABC/ESPN continue. Mike Massaro became a third host of NASCAR Now on ESPN2; Vince Welch replaced Massaro on pit road and Marty Reid is doing selected Nationwide Series events as well. But ESPN continues to face heavy criticism from NASCAR fans who complain of bored announcers, bad camera work, excessive commercials and lack of post-race coverage.

On radio, SiriusXM will carry all races in the series. Terrestrial radio rights are being handled as follows:

- Motor Racing Network will carry races at tracks owned by their corporate sibling, International Speedway Corporation as well as the races at Dover and Pocono and the All-Star Race at Lowe's;
- Speedway Motorsports-owned Performance Racing Network will carry events from those SMI tracks, and will jointly produce the Allstate 400 at the Brickyard with the Indianapolis Motor Speedway Radio Network.

Speed (replacing ESPN Classic) and MRN were the broadcasters at the annual Sprint Cup Banquet at the Wynn Las Vegas Hotel Casino in Las Vegas on December 4. Las Vegas replaced New York City as the host after 27 years there, 26 of the banquets being staged in The Waldorf-Astoria Hotel.

== See also ==
- List of Daytona 500 broadcasters
- List of Wide World of Sports (American TV series) announcers
- List of NASCAR on Fox broadcasters
- List of events broadcast on Wide World of Sports (American TV program)
- NASCAR on television in the 1960s
  - NASCAR on television in the 1970s
  - NASCAR on television in the 1980s
  - NASCAR on television in the 1990s
  - NASCAR on television in the 2010s
  - NASCAR on television in the 2020s
