= NASCAR on television in the 2010s =

On December 7, 2005, NASCAR signed a new eight-year broadcast deal effective with the 2007 season, and valued at $4.48 billion, with Fox and Speed Channel, which would also share event rights with Disney-owned ABC, ESPN and ESPN2, as well as TNT. The rights would be divided as follows:

- Fox became the exclusive broadcaster of the Daytona 500 and also hold the rights to the first thirteen points paying races. In addition, the network carried the Sprint Unlimited and two Truck Series races (the network aired the Kroger 250 from Martinsville Speedway, and the Ohio 250 at Mansfield Motorsports Park in 2007; and the Kroger 250 from Martinsville, as well as the San Bernardino County 200 at Auto Club Speedway, in both 2008 and 2009). Fox did not air any races of what is now the Gander Outdoors Truck Series from 2010 to 2013, with all 25 races instead airing on Speed. Fox's 2011 coverage ended with the STP 400 at Kansas Speedway.
- TNT carried six NASCAR Cup Series races during the month of June and the first half of July, including the Coke Zero 400 at Daytona. In 2013, in particular, the network aired Pocono Raceway, Michigan International Speedway, Sonoma Raceway, Kentucky Speedway, the Coke Zero 400, and New Hampshire Motor Speedway.
- ESPN and ABC (through the ESPN on ABC arrangement) carried the final seventeen NASCAR Cup Series races from the Brickyard 400 through the end of the season, with the NASCAR Chase races airing on ABC (until 2010, when ESPN took over most of the coverage, leaving ABC with the last 3 Saturday night races in their broadcasting period). The entire Nationwide season was aired primarily on ESPN2 and ESPN, with selected races on ABC, NASCAR returned to ESPN airing the first six races including Daytona, Atlanta, Las Vegas, and ESPN2 carrying Phoenix to Michigan.
- Speed/Fox Sports 1 carried the Budweiser Duel races and the Sprint All-Star Race, as well as the entire Camping World Truck Series season, except for the 2 races carried each year by Fox from 2007 to 2009. After the 2009 season, all the Truck races aired on Speed/FS1 – with the exception of the 2014 Talladega race, which aired on Fox.

== Year-by-year summary ==
=== 2010 ===
Fox Sports, their corporate sibling Speed, TNT, and ESPN/ABC are in the fourth year of a seven-year television contract scheduled to expire after the 2014 season. Showtime is going to show a highlights show for the first time.

- Fox - Fox Sports broadcast the first 13 races, including the Budweiser Shootout, the 52nd Daytona 500, and the Coca-Cola 600. With Dover moving to mid-May, Fox ended their coverage with the 51st Coca-Cola 600. The Sprint All-Star Race XXVI along with the Gatorade Duels, practice sessions, and all qualifying and practice sessions (except for Daytona qualifying, which aired on Fox) were all broadcast on Speed. The network's Gopher Cam mascot, Digger, returned for on-screen displays.
- TNT - Time Warner's Turner Sports division (through TNT) broadcast the next six races, including the Coke Zero 400 at Daytona in its limited commercial interruption wide open coverage format. That race will also be telecast in 3-D on both NASCAR.com and DirecTV. TNT's coverage will begin with the June Pocono race and end with Chicagoland. Qualifying and practice sessions will remain on Speed. Adam Alexander will be the new lead announcer, with Lindsay Czarniak hosting pre-and-post-race shows, replacing Bill Weber and Marc Fein respectively.
- ESPN/ABC - ESPN carried the remaining races, beginning with the Brickyard 400. ABC, which formerly carried the last 11 races of the season, will carry the Saturday night races in Bristol, Richmond, and Charlotte. Although previously races could not be moved from ABC to ESPN, early start times and ABC's plans to expand its Sunday morning political shows meant that NASCAR had to allow most Chase races to move to ESPN. This was met from criticism from most of ABC's southern-based affiliates, who had originally counted on NASCAR on those Sundays for ratings gains against the NFL. Most qualifying sessions will air on ESPN2, practice sessions and some qualifying will be shared by SPEED and ESPN2. Qualifying for the Pep Boys Auto 500 and AMP Energy 500 aired on Speed because they are Saturday afternoon sessions during the college football season. Additionally, Jerry Punch was replaced in the play-by-play position by Marty Reid; Punch returned to the pits where he worked at ESPN until 2000.
- Showtime - CBS-owned pay cable premium service Showtime carried a weekly one-hour highlight show titled Inside NASCAR every Wednesday at 10 pm ET/PT, with the series premiere on February 10. Chris Myers, who also hosts FOX's NASCAR coverage, will serve as host, joined by SPEED's Randy Pemberton & Michael Waltrip, and ESPN's Brad Daugherty, with the shows taping at the NASCAR Hall of Fame Studio 43. 38 episodes are planned, covering the season.

In NASCAR on ESPN's advertising campaign, their slogan was "Feel your heart race", a slogan which had already been trademarked by Kyle Petty's Victory Junction Gang. The latter's advertising also appeared on ESPN-carried races. This was changed to "Cause it's Racing" in 2010 and "Nothing Beats First Place" in 2011 and 2012.

During ESPN's broadcasts since 2010, several improvements were made, including reduction in technology. There were also changes in announcing and pit reporters, most notably the moving Dr. Jerry Punch to pit road and IndyCar and occasional Nationwide Series lead announcer Marty Reid to lead broadcaster for the majority of NASCAR broadcasts beginning in 2010, including the Sprint Cup races. Sponsorship by non-NASCAR sponsors was also reduced. Allen Bestwick, formerly the lap-by-lap announcer for NBC's NASCAR coverage from 2001 to 2004, took over as lead broadcaster for Sprint Cup Series races in 2011.

Once the Chase for the Sprint Cup began and even in the races leading up to the Chase, ESPN often shifted its focus to the drivers in the Chase, in particular Jimmie Johnson. Often if a driver not in the Chase was leading and was passed for the lead by a Chase driver, he was not spoken of again for the rest of the broadcast. Case in point: in the November 2009 race in Texas, the vast majority of the broadcast was spent talking about Jimmie Johnson despite the fact he crashed on lap 3 and finished 38th. This was a fear of many once the Chase was introduced.

Finally, in 2010 ESPN, with the consent of NASCAR, changed the networks that races were broadcast on. While the final eleven races of the season were broadcast on ABC from 2007 to 2009, all Sprint Cup races except for the three Saturday Night races in ESPN's portion of the schedule were switched to ESPN (the Bristol night race, previously on ESPN, was moved to ABC). This left only 3 races on over-the-air broadcasters for the last two-thirds of the NASCAR season. This, combined with the moving of the Brickyard 400, arguably NASCAR's second biggest race to ESPN, angered fans and sponsors.

Due to ESPN's various sports commitments, there were several interferences with NASCAR broadcasts. This was especially true once college football season started, when Nationwide Series races would often follow an early college football game. The broadcast start had also been delayed by the Little League World Series and ATP tennis. Many times (at least 15 as of 2010), NASCAR Countdown and even the start of the race were moved to ESPN Classic or, later, ESPNews. Due to contractual agreements with Turner, ESPN could not put broadcasts with ESPN3.com, another fact that angered fans. However, in 2011 an agreement was reached letting ESPN put all NASCAR programming on WatchESPN.

In 2010, because of the movement of the Chase races to ESPN and the earlier standardized 1:00 PM ET start times instituted by NASCAR, ESPN moved NASCAR Countdown to ESPN2 for all Chase races starting at 1:00 PM ET to avoid shortening or moving its Sunday NFL Countdown program. Viewers had to switch to the race at 1:00 PM ET from ESPN2 to ESPN. The next year, NASCAR moved the Chase races to later times (2:00 ET, then 3:00 ET for the final three races; Martinsville maintained a 1:30 PM ET starting time because, at the time, that track lacked lights and the grandstands cast long shadows over the racing surface in the late afternoon).

=== 2011 ===
From the 2011 Budweiser Shootout to 2015, Fox used the NFL on Fox theme song in NASCAR telecasts. In addition, country superstar Dierks Bentley unveiled a new version of his hit song "Sideways", with new lyrics referencing NASCAR – which is played during the introduction of the pre-race show. "Sideways" was phased out entirely with the 2013 Sprint Unlimited telecast, with the Fox NFL theme music being used full-time. In addition, a new CGI introduction sequence, produced by Blur Studio, made its debut.

In 2011, Pizza Hut became the presenting sponsor of the pre-race show on Fox. In addition, the first segment of the telecast was moved from the hotel to a tented facility either trackside or in the infield, depending on the venue. The idea was to build a crowd around the production of the segment; this has similarities to Fox's own NFL pregame show in 2006, as well as the College GameDay football and basketball shows on ESPN.

=== 2012 ===
In 2012, John Roberts filled in for Chris Myers as host for the Budweiser Shootout and the Daytona 500, as Myers was on bereavement leave following his son's death in a motorcycle accident. For the 2014 Sprint Unlimited, Michael Waltrip filled in for Darrell, who was undergoing gallbladder surgery; for Daytona 500 Practice and Pole Qualifying, the position was filled by Phil Parsons. Darrell Waltrip returned for the Budweiser Duels. In 2016, Jeff Gordon replaced McReynolds in the booth while McReynolds was reassigned as the rules and technical analyst, replacing Andy Petree.

In October 2012, NASCAR extended its contract with Fox Sports through 2022, which allowed Fox the online streaming rights for its event telecasts; the Fox Sports contract also retains coverage of the first 13 races of the Monster Energy NASCAR Cup Series and exclusive coverage of the Daytona 500. On August 1, 2013, Fox Sports extended its contract by two additional years through 2024, due to NASCAR's contract with NBC Sports running through that same time, and acquired the rights to the first 16 races of the NASCAR Cup Series season, as well as the first 14 Xfinity (formerly Nationwide) Series events. As a result, Fox will broadcast the races it already covers, as well as all of the events held in June, which include the events at Pocono and Michigan with coverage ending with the Toyota/Save Mart 350 at Sonoma. Fox had previously held rights to these three races under its initial 2001–06 contract.

Under the current deal:

- Fox broadcasts ten points races over the air, including the Daytona 500. Fox Sports 1 carries several other events, including the Busch Clash, Bluegreen Vacations Duel, the NASCAR All-Star Race and six points-paying races, plus the first half of the Xfinity Series season (with the exception of the more prestigious races, which instead aired on Fox from 2015 to 2018, when they were moved to FS1).
- NBC will broadcast seven races over the air including some races in the NASCAR playoffs, with the other races in this part of the season being aired on NBCSN. NBC also airs the remaining races in the Xfinity Series. Playoff races on NBC are a lead in to NBC Sunday Night Football (after local news and NBC Nightly News).
- The Gander Outdoors Truck Series remains exclusively on Fox Sports 1, with selected races airing on Fox.
- Starting in 2013, Spanish-language network Fox Deportes airs select NASCAR Cup races either live or delayed.

=== 2013 ===
From its debut until 2013, Fox initially used a scrolling ticker to display the current running order of drivers and other information (such as intervals and other statistics, shown on an occasionally displayed secondary line), instead of the boxes that were used by previous NASCAR broadcasters. Fox would eventually deploy the banner design across all of its sports properties, while its conventions would be adopted by fellow NASCAR broadcasters, including NBC, TNT, and later ESPN.

Beginning with the Party at the Poconos 400 race on June 9, 2013, TNT's NASCAR coverage switched to a 16:9 aspect ratio letterbox format, though it did retain its on-air graphics package that has been in use since 2007. The ticker across the top of the screen also changed, with the lap counter and TNT network logo both being moved to the upper right-hand corner of the screen. The screen on TNT's standard-definition 4:3 feed now airs a letterboxed version of the native HD feed to match that of Fox's and ESPN's respective default widescreen SD presentations. NASCAR on TNT was the last of the 3 broadcast partners to switch to a widescreen presentation. NBC became the 4th to switch to letterbox format on SD feeds in 2015.

On July 23, 2013, NASCAR announced a nine-year contract with NBC Sports to broadcast the final 20 races of the NASCAR Sprint Cup Series season (from the Coke Zero Sugar 400 at Daytona International Speedway through the Ford EcoBoost 400 at Homestead from 2015 to 2017; in 2018 and 2019, NBC's coverage starts at Chicagoland and ends at Homestead and in 2020 starts in Chicagoland and ends at Phoenix), the final 19 races of the Xfinity Series season, along with coverage of select regional series events and the NASCAR Mexico Series, succeeding both former partners TNT and ESPN. The deal also awarded NBC Sports the rights to provide coverage on digital platforms, rights to Spanish-language coverage for Telemundo and mun2 (now Universo), broadcast rights to the NASCAR Hall of Fame induction ceremony and post-season awards banquets. The deal runs from 2015 to 2024, although the Mexico Series race at Phoenix International Raceway began in 2014.

The majority of NBC's NASCAR coverage under the new contract will air on NBCSN, however seven races will be broadcast by the NBC broadcast network; in 2015 and 2016, they were the Coke Zero Sugar 400, the Bojangles' Southern 500 at Darlington, the Chase races at Charlotte and Kansas, and the last three races (Texas, Phoenix and Homestead–Miami) consecutively.

NBC Sports took over the portion of the contract previously held by ESPN and Turner Sports. While financial details were not disclosed, NBC reportedly paid 50% more than the $2.7 billion paid by ESPN and Turner combined under the previous contract.

Former Turner Sports executive Jeff Behnke serves as vice president of NASCAR programming for NBC Sports.

In August 2013, Speed was replaced by Fox Sports 1, and Fuel TV by Fox Sports 2. Camping World Truck Series races remained on Fox Sports 1, while practice/qualifying sessions and regional series races alternated between Fox Sports 1 and 2 depending on scheduling. For North American markets outside of the United States, coverage of some NASCAR events carried by Speed at the time remained on an international version of Speed (now Fox Sports Racing) that operates in the regions.

On December 3, 2013, Jeff Burton was confirmed as the first member of the NASCAR on NBC broadcast team.

On December 4, 2013, Rick Allen, who previously worked at Fox Sports as an announcer for its Camping World Truck Series coverage, signed a multi-year contract to serve as the lead announcer for NBC's race broadcasts.

=== 2014 ===
This season was the final year of broadcasting for both the ESPN family of networks and Turner Sports. ESPN had covered the second half of the Sprint Cup season since 2007 while Turner Sports ended a thirty-one year relationship with NASCAR on TBS and later TNT. For 2015, their portions of the season were divided between Fox Sports and NBC.

On January 9, 2014, it was confirmed that Steve Letarte would leave his role as Dale Earnhardt Jr.'s crew chief at Hendrick Motorsports and join NBC Sports as a color analyst. Behnke explained that the on-air makeup of NBC Sports' broadcasts would have "a relevancy that hasn't been seen in a long, long time", citing the recent involvements of both Burton and Letarte in NASCAR prior to their move to broadcasting.

NBC began to lead into its new contract in February 2014 with the premiere of a nightly news and analysis program, NASCAR America, on NBCSN, and a broadcast of the Toyota 120 from Phoenix International Raceway – the opening event of the 2014 season of the NASCAR Toyota Series, on mun2.

For the 2014 season, alongside a new corporate style, Fox replaced the scrolling ticker with a leaderboard-style sidebar occupying the right-side portion of the screen, with one section displaying the top three drivers, and a scrolling section displaying the remainder of the field of drivers. While Fox Sports president Eric Shanks justified the changes, noting that it would allow more of the field to be displayed at once and more frequently than the relatively longer ticker, the leaderboard was criticized by viewers during events leading up to the Daytona 500 (such as the Sprint Unlimited, Daytona 500 qualifying, and the ARCA series Lucas Oil 200) for obstructing too much of the screen.

In response to the criticism, Shanks stated that the layout of the leaderboard would be revised in time for the Daytona 500. The vertical leaderboard was reconfigured into a horizontal version with three columns of 3 drivers each, which could be resized into 2 longer columns of three drivers each to display intervals or other statistics (a version that was later used as the main graphic).

The Camping World RV Sales 301, on July 13, 2014, at New Hampshire Motor Speedway, marked the end of NASCAR's 32-year run on Turner Sports, dating back to 1983. The network devoted a large segment of its pre-race show to showing clips of signature NASCAR moments to air on Turner Sports, and welcomed NASCAR president Mike Helton to the broadcast booth to talk about the relationship, as Helton had been the president of Atlanta Motor Speedway when Turner Sports showed its first race at AMS, which aired on TBS in 1983. The pre-race was closed out by Ken Squier, a New England native, lap-by-lap announcer for Turner Sports from its start in 1983 through 1998.

Hello everyone, I'm Ken Squier. And as the engines have fired at New Hampshire, I remind you that this is the final NASCAR broadcast for Turner Sports. I was the play-by-play announcer for TBS for 18 years, beginning in the very first year of NASCAR coverage, 1983. It's been a real honor to be a part of today's broadcast, and I wish my colleagues the very best today on TNT, as this amazing, 31-year run, comes to a close. I hope you enjoy today's race.

During NASCAR's 31-year run on Turner Sports, the races aired on TBS (1983–2000) and TNT (2001–2014).

On November 16, 2014, the Ford EcoBoost 400 at Homestead–Miami Speedway marked the end of NASCAR's 30-year, two-stint run on ESPN, dating back to 1981 and also, ending an eight-year stint with the network since 2007. Allen Bestwick, who served as lap-by-lap announcer for ESPN's Sprint Cup Series races since 2011, worked his final NASCAR broadcast on network television, marking the end of his role with the network in 29 years covering the sport and remained with ESPN and ABC covering IndyCar races from 2015 to 2018.

"We look forward to continuing to cover the sport on SportsCenter next and at Daytona and more going down the road. Now for Bob Jenkins and Larry Nuber, for Benny Parsons and Ned Jarrett, for Dale Jarrett and Andy Petree. Allen Bestwick, so long from Homestead."

— Allen Bestwick's call for the final NASCAR race on ESPN.

=== 2015 ===
The season marked the first season of a new television contract. During the season, races were televised in the United States on Fox, Fox Sports 1, NBC, and NBCSN. ESPN and Turner Sports, who televised races from 2007 to 2014, did not seek to renew their contracts with NASCAR following the completion of the 2014 season; this marked the end of a 31-year relationship between NASCAR and Turner's primary stations, TBS and TNT. In addition, it was the first season on the newly rebranded Fox Sports Racing in Canada and the Caribbean. As in their prior arrangement, Fox covered the first half of the season while NBC covered the second half, which includes the Chase for the Sprint Cup. While still dividing the coverage of the Daytona races between the two networks, the nature of the split was changed. Fox retained its exclusive rights to the Daytona 500 while NBC gained exclusive rights to the Coke Zero 400. Under the previous Fox/NBC contract, Fox televised the Daytona 500 in odd numbered years (2001, 2003, 2005) while NBC did so in even numbered years (2002, 2004, 2006). Under the old arrangement, the network that did not air the Daytona 500 would air the now-Coke Zero 400.

On February 3, 2015, NBC Sports announced an agreement to air 39 regional series races from the K&N Pro Series East and K&N Pro Series West, Whelen Modified Tour and Whelen Southern Modified Tour on NBCSN.

The first U.S.-series race under the contract was The Hart to Heart Breast Cancer Foundation 150—the first race of the 2015 NASCAR K&N Pro Series East season—at New Smyrna Speedway, and was aired on February 19 on NBCSN.

From 2015 to 2017, the intro for the revived run of NASCAR on NBC was "Bringing Back the Sunshine" performed by country music artist Blake Shelton, who is also one of the coaches on NBC's own prime time hit show, The Voice. NBC introduced a new opening for their coverage of NASCAR starting in 2018. The new opening is a cover version of the Tom Petty song "Runnin' Down a Dream", done by ZZ Ward.

On April 15, 2015, it was announced that Ralph Sheheen and Ray Evernham would be part of the booth of the NBCSN telecasts of the Whelen Modified Tour and Whelen Southern Modified Tour.

On June 1, 2015, Brian Vickers announced via Twitter that he would be joining the NBC telecasts of the New Hampshire and Michigan races.

On September 1, 2015, it was announced that Ken Squier and Ned Jarrett would commentate a portion of the 2015 Bojangles' Southern 500 along with current NASCAR on NBC commentator Dale Jarrett. Squier was also in the broadcast booth for Sprint Cup Series final practice. This has become a standard tradition at the Southern 500, due to NASCAR designating the race as a throwback weekend where teams bring retro paint schemes to the track.

On September 11, 2015, it was announced that Carl Edwards would be in the NBCSN broadcast booth as a guest analyst for the Xfinity race at Richmond alongside Dale Jarrett and Diffey. Jamie McMurray was a guest analyst for the NXS race at Chicagoland.

=== 2016 ===
2016 marks the second year of NASCAR's broadcast deal with Fox and NBC. The first 16 events were broadcast on either Fox or FS1, and the final 20 events were shared between NBC and NBCSN. However, the Cheez-It 355 at Watkins Glen International was aired on USA Network due to NBC's coverage of the 2016 Summer Olympics. In Canada, TSN televised each race, including the qualifying races for the Daytona 500 and exhibition races, under the name NASCAR on TSN. TSN also had coverage of practice and qualifying for each race. In Latin America, except Brazil, all races were broadcast by Fox Sports, on their Fox Sports 3 channel (previously known as SPEED Latin America). In Brazil, most races were broadcast by Fox Sports, on their Fox Sports 2 channel.

As previously mentioned, during Summer Olympic years (three during the contract, in 2016, 2020, and 2024), NBC will assign different NBCUniversal channels to air races as a result of scheduling conflicts. For 2016, CNBC (used for English Premier League, IndyCar, and Formula One for NBCSN conflicts) carried Sprint Cup and Xfinity qualifying along with one Xfinity race, and USA Network (used for Premier League conflicts) carried two Xfinity and one Sprint Cup race. In 2020, the Cup Series will take two weeks off to minimize any conflict with the Olympics; the Michigan race will be run on the day of the Games' closing ceremony.

=== 2017 ===
On June 10, 2017, the Xfinity Series race at Pocono Raceway was presented by current drivers in the Cup Series, the first time that a national sporting event was covered by currently active athletes. The presenters provided coverage from all three perspectives during the race (Hollywood Hotel studio, lap-by-lap commentary and pit road coverage). The driver commentators were Kevin Harvick (lap-by-lap), Joey Logano, Clint Bowyer (color analysts), Erik Jones, Ryan Blaney, Ricky Stenhouse Jr. (pit road), Danica Patrick and Denny Hamlin (Hollywood Hotel).

On July 24, 2017, it was announced that Dale Earnhardt Jr. would join the NASCAR on NBC broadcasting team for the 2018 season, incidentally reuniting with his former crew chief Letarte.

In November 2017, it was announced that Bob Costas would alongside Krista Voda, co-anchor NBC's pre-race coverage leading into the NASCAR Cup Series finale from Homestead.

=== 2018 ===
In the 2018 season, Fox reintroduced a vertical leaderboard, although this time it was initially occupied an opaque sidebar spanning the entire left side of the screen. The design was once-again criticized by viewers during events leading up to the Daytona 500, as the opaque sidebar reduced the amount of screen space devoted to race footage to a roughly 4:3 window, the ticker fell within overscan on some televisions, while some camera shots were not correctly framed to suit the new layout. By the Daytona 500, the graphic had been revised to remove the opaque sidebar, and make the leaderboard slightly translucent.

On April 28, 2018, the Sparks Energy 300, the Xfinity race at Talladega Superspeedway, was an all-drivers broadcast, the second time that a national sporting event was covered entirely by active athletes, the first being the aforementioned Pocono race. The presenters provided coverage from all three perspectives during the race (Hollywood Hotel studio, lap-by-lap commentary and pit road coverage). The booth team of Harvick, Logano and Bowyer was retained, while Ricky Stenhouse Jr. was moved to the Hollywood Hotel alongside Brad Keselowski, with Bubba Wallace replacing Stenhouse as a pit road reporter.

The studio was retired following the 2018 season due to the Charlotte studios getting redone in order to host more shows. In 2019, Fox often cut to the Charlotte studio during the race and talked to Jamie McMurray, who was new to the NASCAR on Fox team.

NBC's pit reporters for 2018 consisted of Dave Burns, Marty Snider, Kelli Stavast, Parker Kligerman (who replaced Mike Massaro following the 2016 season), and Ralph Sheheen, Burns and Snider were with NBC's original NASCAR pit crew, while Massaro joins from ESPN's NASCAR team and Stavast from the network's sports car coverage. The pre-race show was hosted by former Fox reporter Krista Voda along with former ESPN analyst Dale Jarrett, former TNT analyst Kyle Petty, and Top Gear host Rutledge Wood.

=== 2019 ===
In 2019, during Daytona 500 qualifying, Fox introduced a new augmented reality "GhostCar", allowing for a live visualization of a previous driver's qualifying lap (such as the leader or driver on the bubble) to be overlaid into live footage of another driver's qualifying attempt. NBC had introduced the system in 2018, but only during replays. The GhostCar feature was re-introduced later in the season, when NASCAR ended its multi-car qualifying format in favor of the previous single-car format.

On May 25, 2019, the Alsco 300, the Xfinity race at Charlotte Motor Speedway, was an all-drivers broadcast, the third time that a national sporting event was covered entirely by active athletes, the first being the aforementioned Pocono race. The presenters provided coverage from all three perspectives during the race (Hollywood Hotel studio, lap-by-lap commentary and pit road coverage). The booth team of Harvick, Logano and Bowyer was retained, Erik Jones, Ryan Blaney, Bubba Wallace (pit road) was also retained, Brad Keselowski, Ricky Stenhouse Jr. and Chad Knaus hosted from the Charlotte studios.

In July 2019, it was announced that Danielle Trotta will join NBC Sports’ NASCAR coverage as host of the “Victory Lap” post-race show for select Cup Series races this year.

== See also ==
- List of Daytona 500 broadcasters
- List of NASCAR on Fox broadcasters
- NASCAR on television in the 1960s
  - NASCAR on television in the 1970s
  - NASCAR on television in the 1980s
  - NASCAR on television in the 1990s
  - NASCAR on television in the 2000s
  - NASCAR on television in the 2020s
