= List of Wide World of Sports (American TV series) announcers =

== Hosts ==
- Jim McKay (1961–1986); occasionally (1987–1998)
- Becky Dixon (1987–1988)
- Frank Gifford (1987–1992)
- John Saunders (1993)
- Julie Moran (1994–1995)
- Robin Roberts (1996–1998)

== Event announcers ==
- Jesse Abramson
- Mike Adamle
- Muhammad Ali
- Liz Allan
- Mel Allen
- Donnie Allison
- Erin Andrews
- Eddie Arcaro
- Jack Arute
- Arthur Ashe
- Paul Azinger
- Red Barber
- Bob Beamon
- Jim Beatty
- Stan Benham
- Jules Bergman
- Chris Berman
- Bob Beattie
- Jon Beekhuis
- Hobie Billingsley
- Larry Birleffi
- Don Blasingame
- Ralph Boston
- Bobby Bragan
- Tim Brant
- Charlie Brockman
- Bruce Brown
- Lynn Burke
- Dick Button
- Steve Cauthen
- Jennifer Chandler
- Don Chevrier
- Bill Clement
- Cris Collinsworth
- Les Connelly
- Howard Cosell
- Terry Crawford
- Donna De Varona
- Art Devlin
- Dan Dierdorf
- Dave Diles
- Ken Dryden
- Don Drysdale
- Chris Economaki
- Jack Edwards
- Len Elmore
- Vic Emery
- Stein Erickson
- Mike Eruzione
- Larry Evans
- Nick Faldo
- Carlton Fisk
- Peggy Fleming
- Bill Flemming
- George Foreman
- Sonny Fox
- Russ Francis
- Ray Gandolf
- Terry Gannon
- Paul Gardner
- Don Garlits
- Gary Gerould
- Roger Gibbs
- Frank Gifford
- Hank Goldberg
- Scott Goodyear
- Curt Gowdy
- Jerry Gross
- Muriel Grossfield
- Merle Harmon
- Bill Hartack
- Eric Heiden
- Carol Heiss
- Russ Hellickson
- Fred Hemmings
- Jim Hendrick
- Anne Henning
- Monte Henson
- Phil Hill
- Keith Jackson
- Reggie Jackson
- Bob Jenkins
- Bruce Jenner
- Dave Jennings
- Peter Jennings
- Dave Johnson
- Parker Johnstone
- Charlie Jones
- Fran Jones
- Hayes Jones
- James Jones
- Alex Karras
- Jimmy Key
- Billy Kidd
- Kirk Kilgour
- Billie Jean King
- Micki King
- Andrea Kirby
- Evel Knievel
- Bill Koch
- Ken Kraft
- Jim Lampley
- David Letterman
- Mark Lieberman
- Craig Lincoln
- Marty Liquori
- John Long
- Davey Lopes
- Fred Lorenzen
- Verne Lundquist
- Mario Machado
- Gordon Maddux
- Larry Mahan
- Tom Mahoney
- Walter Malmquist
- Mickey Mantle
- Sal Marchiano
- Dave Marr
- Chris McCarron
- Stew McDonald
- Jim McKay
- Clem McSpadden
- Barry Melrose
- Steve Melnyk
- Mike Mentzer
- Arthur Mercante Sr.
- Don Meredith
- Ann Meyers
- Al Michaels
- Dick Miles
- Cheryl Miller
- Bob Montgomery
- Julie Moran
- John Morgan
- Stirling Moss
- Bill Muncey
- Brent Musburger
- Stu Nahan
- Joe Namath
- Renaldo Nehemiah
- Skip Newell
- Andy North
- Larry Nuber
- Diana Nyad
- Margo Oberg
- Parry O'Brien
- Ron O'Brien
- Michael O'Hehir
- Paul Page
- Bud Palmer
- Jim Palmer
- Darren Pang
- Benny Parsons
- Dan Patrick
- Roger Penske
- Jimmy Piersall
- Ross Porter
- Sam Posey
- Cynthia Potter
- Jason Priestley
- Kirby Puckett
- Ronnie Ramsey
- Jay Rand
- Judy Rankin
- Randy Rarick
- Marty Reid
- Sam Renick
- Harold Reynolds
- Larry Rice
- Bob Richards
- Robert Riger
- Cathy Rigby
- Jimmy Roberts
- Kenny Roberts
- Robin Roberts
- Brooks Robinson
- Jackie Robinson
- Bob Rose
- Murray Rose
- Hughes Rudd
- Wilma Rudolph
- Bill Russell
- Johnny Rutherford
- Dave Ryan
- Maria Sansone
- David Santee
- Jeanne Saubert
- Al Scates
- Dick Schapp
- Jody Scheckter
- Karl Schranz
- Judy Scheer
- Chris Schenkel
- Art Scholl
- Don Schollander
- Arnold Schwarzenegger
- Dave Scott
- Vin Scully
- Bob Seagren
- Erich Segal
- Johnny Sellers
- Dan Shulman
- Anne Simon
- Jim Simpson
- O. J. Simpson
- Ken Sitzberger
- Jeff Smith
- Mike E. Smith
- Tom Sneva
- Mark Spitz
- Ken Squier
- Willie Stargell
- Bill Steinkraus
- Jackie Stewart
- Steve Stone
- Dwight Stones
- Dennis Storer
- Curtis Strange
- Danny Sullivan
- Rell Sun
- Don Sutton
- Lynn Swann
- Katherine Switzer
- Fran Tarkenton
- Don Tarr
- Kurt Thomas
- Shaun Thomson
- Michael Thompson
- Gary Thorne
- Mike Tirico
- Bill Toomey
- Cheryl Touissant
- Al Trautwig
- Jack Twyman
- Bob Uecker
- Bob Varsha
- Bill Veeck
- Lesley Visser
- Dick Vitale
- Alex Wallau
- Rusty Wallace
- Rodger Ward
- Earl Weaver
- Vince Welch
- Billy Welu
- Jack Whitaker
- Bruce Wilhelm
- Ted Williams
- George Willig
- Warner Wolf
- Michael Young
- Sheila Young
- Steve Zabriskie

=== Events broadcast on WWOS ===
- Adventure racing
- Aerobatics
- Air shows
- Air races
- Auto racing: CART, NASCAR, Formula One, Endurance car racing, Dirt track racing, Late Model Racing, Modified Racing, Midget car racing, Sprint car racing, Drag racing, Jeep racing, Super truck racing, Dune buggy racing, KART racing, Sports car racing on ice, Touring car racing, Cross country racing
- Auto non-racing: Auto daredevil jumps, Auto thrill shows, Demolition derbies, Figure eights
- Barrel jumping
- Baseball
- Basketball
- Baton twirling
- Beach soccer
- Beach volleyball
- Bikini competitions
- Billiards
- Boat racing: Hydroplane racing, Cutter racing, Dory boat racing, Ice boat racing, Power boat racing, Yacht racing
- Bobsled
- Body building
- Bowling
- Boxing: Men's and women's
- Bridge
- Canoeing
- Chess
- Climbing: Eiffel Tower climbing, Mountain climbing, Rock climbing
- Cricket
- Croquet
- Cycling: Racing, Mountain biking
- Cycloball
- Diving: Platform/Springboard diving, Cliff diving, High diving
- Dog sled racing
- Fencing
- Fighter Interceptor Rocketry
- Figure skating
- Fireman's competition
- Fishing: Great white shark hunting, Tarpon fishing, Trout fishing
- Frisbee
- Frog jumping
- Football: American football, Arena football, Australian Rules football
- Golf
- Gymnastics: Artistic gymnastics, Rhythmic gymnastics
- High wire walking
- Horse racing: Thoroughbred racing, Trotting, Steeplechse, Horse racing on ice
- Horse jumping
- Hurling
- Ice skating marathon
- Kayak
- Lacrosse
- Lifesaving
- Luge
- Lumberjack Championships
- Martial arts: Judo, Karate, Kick boxing, Kung Fu
- Monster trucks
- Motorcycle daredevil jumps
- Motorcycle racing: Track racing, cross country racing, steeplechase racing, motocross, ice racing, side car racing
- Parachuting
- Platform tennis
- Polo
- Pool
- Rattlesnake hunt
- Rodeo
- Roller skating
- Rowing
- Rugby
- Running: Marathon, Mini-marathon, cross country, endurance running (100 miles)
- Running of the bulls
- Skateboarding
- Skiing: Alpine skiing, cross country skiing, speed skiing
- Ski jumping: Jumping, Flying, Acrobatic
- Sky diving
- Snowboarding
- Snowmobile racing
- Soap box derby
- Soccer
- Softball
- Special Olympics
- Speed skating: Long track, Short track
- Sumo wrestling
- Surfing
- Swimming
- Synchronized swimming
- Table tennis
- Tennis
- Tobogganing
- Track and Field
- Trampoline
- Triathlon: Ironman, Winter Ironman
- Volleyball
- Water polo
- Water skiing
- Water ski kite flying
- Weightlifting
- Wrestling
- Wrist wrestling
- X Games: Summer, Winter
