= Bill Flemming =

American sports journalist (1926–2007)

- Born: William Norman Flemming; September 3, 1926; Chicago, Illinois, U.S.
- Died: July 20, 2007 (aged 80); Petoskey, Michigan, U.S.
- Education: University of Michigan
- Occupation: Television sports journalist

William Norman Flemming (September 3, 1926 – July 20, 2007) was an American television sports journalist who was one of the original announcers for the ABC Sports show Wide World of Sports.

== Biography ==
=== Early life ===
Born in Chicago, Illinois, and raised by his aunt and uncle, Martha Gorrell Flemming and George A. Flemming, and moved to Ann Arbor, Michigan, by the time he entered high school. While at Ann Arbor High School, he was a member of their state championship football team in 1943. Flemming was also a member of the high school basketball team.

=== College life ===
Attending the University of Michigan in Ann Arbor, he entered as a Pre-medical major, but switched to speech after winning a campus wide speech contest which earned him a summer job at WUOM, the campus radio station. Flemming would work his way up to sports director of the radio station. He was a member of Delta Tau Delta International Fraternity.

=== Broadcasting career ===
After graduating from Michigan, he went to work for WWJ-TV in Detroit in 1953 and later appeared on NBC's Today Show before joining ABC's Wide World of Sports in 1961. He was the original voice of the Detroit Pistons, calling their radio broadcasts from 1957 (their first season in Detroit) to 1962.

While with ABC, Flemming covered over 600 events for the program, including college football, golf and cliff-diving. One of the assignments he cherished broadcasting was the Michigan-Ohio State football game since Flemming was a Michigan graduate. Other sports that Flemming called on Wide World of Sports were bobsledding, chess, auto racing and the Olympic Games. His first event called on ABC was the Drake Relays track and field event in Des Moines, Iowa, while his fellow broadcaster Jim McKay called the Penn Relays athletic event in Philadelphia.

While at NBC, Flemming also called the US Open golf tournament in 1957. It was Flemming's reputation for tact and persistence that made him the go-to man in interviewing the reclusive Bobby Fischer during the 1972 World Chess Championships in Reykjavík, Iceland when Fischer was competing against defending champion Boris Spassky of the then-Soviet Union.

Flemming was the first voice of the NCAA Division I Men's Basketball Championship on television.

Flemming was a past president of the Detroit Sports Media Association and was named a Lifetime Member of the DSMA. On June 20, 2008, Flemming was elected posthumously to the Michigan Sports Hall of Fame.

=== Personal life ===
Flemming married the former Barbara Forster. Their marriage produced two children, and they had two grandchildren. Living in Bloomfield Hills, Michigan, Flemming was a pilot with over 6,000 hours logged. From 1998 until his 2007 death, Flemming split his time between his homes in Good Hart, Michigan, and Marco Island, Florida.

=== Death ===
Flemming died of prostate cancer on July 20, 2007, in Petoskey, Michigan. A memorial service was held on August 10 in Harbor Springs.
