= 2007 Coca-Cola 600 =

Auto race held at Lowe's Motor Speedway in 2007

Race details
- Race 12 of 36 in the 2007 NASCAR Nextel Cup Series
- Date: May 27, 2007
- Official name: Coca-Cola 600
- Location: Lowe's Motor Speedway, Concord, North Carolina
- Course: Permanent racing facility
- Course length: 1.5 miles (2.414 km)
- Distance: 400 laps, 600 mi (965.606 km)
- Weather: Temperatures of 87.1 °F (30.6 °C); wind speeds of 8.9 miles per hour (14.3 km/h)
- Average speed: 130.222 miles per hour (209.572 km/h)
- Attendance: 175,000

Pole position
Driver	Ryan Newman	Penske Racing South
- Time: 29.140

Most laps led
Driver	Kurt Busch	Penske Racing South
- Laps: 107

Winner
No. 25	Casey Mears	Hendrick Motorsports

Television in the United States
- Network: Fox Broadcasting Company
- Announcers: Mike Joy, Darrell Waltrip, Larry McReynolds
- Nielsen ratings: 4.5/10 (Final); 4.5/9 (Overnight)

Radio in the United States
- Radio: Performance Racing Network
- Booth announcers: Doug Rice, Mark Garrow
- Turn announcers: Pat Patterson, Brent McMillian, Chuck Carland

The 2007 Coca-Cola 600 was the 12th stock car race of the 2007 NASCAR Nextel Cup Series and the event's 48th iteration. It was held on May 27, 2007, with 175,000 spectators in attendance, in Concord, North Carolina at Lowe's Motor Speedway, an intermediate track that holds NASCAR races. Casey Mears of the Hendrick Motorsports team won the 400-lap race after starting 16th. Joe Gibbs Racing's J. J. Yeley finished second and Kyle Petty of Petty Enterprises took third.

Before the race, Jeff Gordon led the Drivers' Championship by 231 points over his Hendrick Motorsports teammate Jimmie Johnson in second. Ryan Newman took the pole position by recording the fastest lap in the qualifying session and led the first ten laps before his Penske Racing South teammate Kurt Busch took over on lap 11. Busch led for 107 laps (the most of any driver in the race) before Brian Vickers took the lead after the first round of green-flag pit stops. Jimmie Johnson took the lead from Vickers on lap 184 and held it for 83 laps, battling for the position with Vickers and Matt Kenseth. Tony Stewart led at the race's final restart on lap 342 and held it until he made a pit stop for fuel 51 laps later. Mears took the lead after Dale Earnhardt Jr. and Denny Hamlin made similar pit stops, slowing to conserve fuel and winning. There were thirteen cautions and 29 lead changes among fifteen drivers during the race.

As of 2025, the 2007 race is Mears' only win in the Nextel Cup Series, now known as the NASCAR Cup Series. After the race Gordon's lead in the Drivers' Championship was reduced to 132 points over Johnson because he crashed early in the race. Chevrolet increased its points advantage to 41 points ahead of Ford in the Manufacturers' Championship. Dodge moved further ahead of Toyota in the battle for third place, with 24 races remaining in the season.

== Background ==
Lowe's Motor Speedway, where the race was held

The Coca-Cola 600 was the twelfth scheduled stock car race of the 2007 NASCAR Nextel Cup Series, out of 36, and the event's 48th iteration. It ran for 400 laps over a distance of 600 mi (970 km), and was held on May 27, 2007 in Concord, North Carolina at Lowe's Motor Speedway, now called Charlotte Motor Speedway, an intermediate track that holds NASCAR races. The standard track at Lowe's Motor Speedway is a four-turn, 1.5-mile (2.4 km)-long, quad-oval track. The track's turns are banked at 24 degrees; both the front stretch (the location of the finish line) and the back stretch (opposite the front) have a five-degree banking.

Before the race, Jeff Gordon led the Drivers' Championship with 1,881 points, with teammate Jimmie Johnson 231 points behind in second and Matt Kenseth a further 68 points behind in third. Denny Hamlin and Jeff Burton were fourth and fifth, and Tony Stewart, Kurt Busch, Kevin Harvick, Clint Bowyer, Carl Edwards, Kyle Busch and Jamie McMurray rounded out the top twelve. Chevrolet led the Manufacturers' Championship with 96 points, 35 points ahead of its rival Ford in second. Dodge with 52 points was 19 points ahead of Toyota in the battle for third place. The race's defending champion was Kasey Kahne.

The Coca-Cola 600 was conceived by race car driver Curtis Turner, who built the Charlotte Motor Speedway. It was first held in 1960 in an attempt by NASCAR to stage a Memorial Day weekend race to compete with the open-wheel Indianapolis 500; the two races were held together on the same day starting from 1974. The race is the longest in terms of distance on the NASCAR calendar, and is considered by several drivers to be one of the sport's most important races alongside the Daytona 500, the Brickyard 400 and the Southern 500. The long distance makes it the most physically demanding event in NASCAR, and teams adapt to changing track conditions because the race occurs between late afternoon and evening. It was known as the World 600 until 1984 when The Coca-Cola Company purchased the naming rights to the race and renamed it the Coca-Cola World 600 in 1985. It has been called the Coca-Cola 600 every year since 1986 except for 2002 when the name changed to Coca-Cola Racing Family 600.

In preparation for the race, NASCAR held several test sessions on May 7–8, 2007, to allow teams to prepare for the May races at Lowe's Motor Speedway. Sessions began at 2:00 p.m. Eastern Daylight Time (EDT) on May 7 and concluded at 9:00 p.m. On May 8, sessions started at 1:00 p.m. and stopped at 9:00 p.m. Eighty-two cars participated in the May 7 afternoon session; Martin Truex Jr. was quickest with a speed of 180.596 miles per hour (290.641 km/h) and David Stremme had the highest speed of the two days at 187.000 miles per hour (300.947 km/h) in the evening session. Towards the end of the second session, Hamlin lost control of his car and made heavy contact with an outside SAFER barrier; he was evaluated at the infield care center and was later released to continue testing. During the third session with eighty-four cars, Jeremy Mayfield had the fastest speed of 183.667 miles per hour (295.583 km/h) and Kurt Busch set the fastest speed of 185.644 miles per hour (298.765 km/h) in the fourth and final session held in the evening. David Gilliland spun but avoided contact with a wall.

There was one change of driver before the race. Starting at the 2007 Coca-Cola 600, 1988 NASCAR Winston Cup Series champion Bill Elliott returned to NASCAR on a part-time schedule for Wood Brothers Racing, replacing the team's regular driver Ken Schrader, who drove in the season's first eleven races. Elliott was eligible to use six Champion's Provisionals if the need arose. Elliott was looking forward to returning to racing: "I was pretty honored to get a call from the Wood Brothers to drive the 21 car. I've seen them struggle the last few weeks, being outside the top 35, and it breaks my heart to see them miss races. I hope I can get in the car, get us qualified well every week and see what we can make up in the points battle along the way."

== Practice and qualification ==
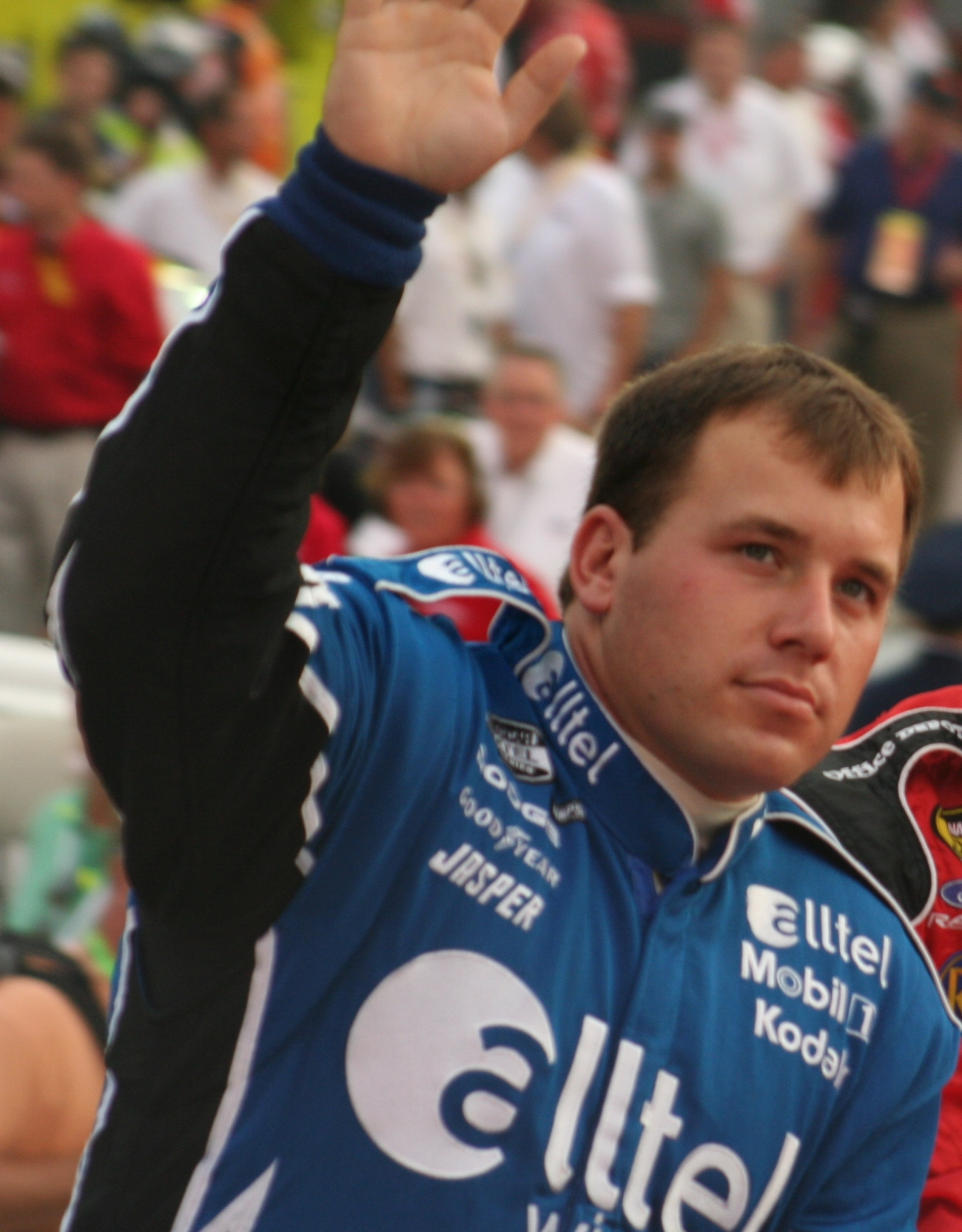
Ryan Newman had the thirty-ninth pole position of his career.

Three practice sessions were held before the Sunday race; one on Thursday and two on Saturday. The first session lasted 90 minutes, the second 50 minutes and the third 60 minutes. In the first practice session, Elliott Sadler was fastest with a time of 29.697 seconds; Kahne, Ricky Rudd, Johnson, Casey Mears, Kenseth, Joe Nemechek, Kyle Busch, Scott Riggs and Jamie McMurray completed the session's top-ten drivers. Sterling Marlin hit one of the walls lining the track and switched to a back-up car. Michael Waltrip did not need to switch cars after a similar collision.

Forty-nine cars entered qualifying on Friday evening; due to NASCAR's qualifying procedure forty-three were allowed to race. Each driver ran two laps, with the starting order determined by the competitor's fastest times. Drivers who set their laps late in qualifying had an advantage because the track was at its coolest. Ryan Newman clinched the 39th pole position of his career, with a time of 29.140 seconds. He was joined on the grid's front row by his Penske Racing South teammate Kurt Busch, and was the second-to-last driver to record his lap. Sadler qualified third, Dale Earnhardt Jr. fourth, and Kenseth fifth. Hamlin, Rudd, Dave Blaney, Bobby Labonte and Stremme rounded out the top ten qualifiers. Jeff Green crashed in the second turn while on a lap and used a provisional to qualify. The six drivers who failed to qualify were Kevin Lepage, David Reutimann (who crashed on his lap) Waltrip (who lost control of his car in the second turn on his second qualifying lap, tearing off a front tire after hitting an inside wall and made contact with it a second time before stopping), Mike Bliss, Paul Menard and Ward Burton. After the qualifier, Newman said he felt pressure to achieve Penske's Racing South's first victory at Charlotte Motor Speedway: "He's only been trying here for like 20 years, so yeah it would be special. It's been something that weighs on the drivers and the teams". He also said he felt he could have recorded a faster lap time and was worried about teammate Kurt Busch's qualifying form.

On Saturday afternoon in sunny and warm weather conditions, Newman was fastest in the second practice session with a time of 30.562 seconds, ahead of Sadler, Kurt Busch, Mark Martin, Greg Biffle, Earnhardt, Edwards, Rudd, McMurray and Kahne. During the session, teams were scuffing their tires; in the first minute, Bowyer crashed after he spun in turn two and switched to a back-up car in which he set five more lap times. Shortly afterward, Nemechek spun after exiting the second turn but avoided damaging his car. Later that day, Edwards led the final practice session with a time of 30.043 seconds; Biffle, Newman, Sadler, J. J. Yeley, Truex. Kurt Busch, Jeff Gordon, Kenseth, and Jeff Burton were in positions two through ten. Kyle Busch damaged his right-rear quarter after hitting a right-hand wall, but did not switch to a back-up car.

=== Qualifying results ===
Qualifying results
Grid	Car	Driver	Team	Manufacturer	Time	Speed
1	12	Ryan Newman	Penske Racing South	Dodge	29.140	185.312
2	2	Kurt Busch	Penske Racing South	Dodge	29.179	185.065
3	19	Elliott Sadler	Evernham Motorsports	Dodge	29.189	185.001
4	8	Dale Earnhardt Jr.	Dale Earnhardt, Inc.	Chevrolet	29.247	184.634
5	17	Matt Kenseth	Roush Fenway Racing	Ford	29.311	184.231
6	11	Denny Hamlin	Joe Gibbs Racing	Chevrolet	29.312	184.225
7	88	Ricky Rudd	Robert Yates Racing	Ford	29.355	183.955
8	22	Dave Blaney	Bill Davis Racing	Toyota	29.370	183.861
9	43	Bobby Labonte	Petty Enterprises	Dodge	29.422	183.536
10	40	David Stremme	Chip Ganassi Racing	Dodge	29.423	183.530
11	01	Mark Martin	Ginn Racing	Chevrolet	29.437	183.443
12	18	J. J. Yeley	Joe Gibbs Racing	Chevrolet	29.458	183.312
13	6	David Ragan	Roush Fenway Racing	Ford	29.469	183.243^{1}
14	20	Tony Stewart	Joe Gibbs Racing	Chevrolet	29.493	183.094
15	10	Scott Riggs	Evernham Motorsports	Dodge	29.506	183.014
16	25	Casey Mears	Hendrick Motorsports	Chevrolet	29.526	182.890
17	5	Kyle Busch	Hendrick Motorsports	Chevrolet	29.557	182.698
18	9	Kasey Kahne	Evernham Motorsports	Dodge	29.557	182.698
19	38	David Gilliland	Robert Yates Racing	Ford	29.575	182.587
20	42	Juan Pablo Montoya	Chip Ganassi Racing	Dodge	29.579	182.562
21	48	Jimmie Johnson	Hendrick Motorsports	Chevrolet	29.585	182.525
22	21	Bill Elliott	Wood Brothers Racing	Ford	29.601	182.426
23	44	Dale Jarrett	Michael Waltrip Racing	Toyota	29.607	182.389
24	36	Jeremy Mayfield	Bill Davis Racing	Toyota	29.621	182.303
25	31	Jeff Burton	Richard Childress Racing	Chevrolet	29.624	182.285
26	83	Brian Vickers	Red Bull Racing Team	Toyota	29.626	182.272
27	29	Kevin Harvick	Richard Childress Racing	Chevrolet	29.627	182.266^{1}
28	26	Jamie McMurray	Roush Fenway Racing	Ford	29.630	182.248
29	84	A. J. Allmendinger	Red Bull Racing Team	Toyota	29.630	182.248
30	14	Sterling Marlin	Ginn Racing	Chevrolet	29.631	182.242
31	1	Martin Truex Jr.	Dale Earnhardt, Inc.	Chevrolet	29.637	182.205
32	24	Jeff Gordon	Hendrick Motorsports	Chevrolet	29.674	181.977
33	13	Joe Nemechek	Ginn Racing	Chevrolet	29.683	181.922
34	41	Reed Sorenson	Chip Ganassi Racing	Dodge	29.701	181.812
35	7	Robby Gordon	Robby Gordon Motorsports	Ford	29.781	181.324
36	45	Kyle Petty	Petty Enterprises	Dodge	29.828	181.038
37	96	Tony Raines	Hall of Fame Racing	Chevrolet	29.865	180.814
38	16	Greg Biffle	Roush Fenway Racing	Ford	29.897	180.620
39	99	Carl Edwards	Roush Fenway Racing	Ford	29.926	180.445
40	70	Johnny Sauter	Haas CNC Racing	Chevrolet	30.067	179.599
41	07	Clint Bowyer	Richard Childress Racing	Chevrolet	30.776	175.461^{1}
42	66	Jeff Green	Haas CNC Racing	Chevrolet	–	–
43	78	Kenny Wallace	Furniture Row Racing	Chevrolet	29.633	182.229
44	15	Paul Menard	Dale Earnhardt, Inc.	Chevrolet	29.646	182.149
45	55	Michael Waltrip	Michael Waltrip Racing	Toyota	29.795	181.238
46	4	Ward Burton	Morgan-McClure Motorsports	Chevrolet	29.821	181.080
47	37	Kevin Lepage	Front Row Motorsports	Dodge	29.916	180.505
48	49	Mike Bliss	BAM Racing	Dodge	30.490	177.107
49	00	David Reutimann	Michael Waltrip Racing	Toyota	–	–
^{1} Moved to the back of the grid for changing engines (#6, #29) and for going to a backup car (#07)

== Race ==
=== Laps 1–112 ===
Live television coverage of the race began at 5:00 p.m. EDT in the United States on Fox. Commentary was provided by Mike Joy, Darrell Waltrip, and Larry McReynolds. Around the start of the race, weather conditions were partly cloudy with an air temperature between 70 and 87 °F (21 and 31 °C) and a track temperature which ranged between 85 and 130 °F (29 and 54 °C). William K. Thierfelder, president of Belmont Abbey College in Belmont, North Carolina, began pre-race ceremonies with an invocation. Country and pop music singer LeAnn Rimes performed the national anthem, and sponsored contest award winners commanded the drivers to start their engines. During the pace laps, three drivers moved to the rear of the field because of unapproved changes; Bowyer had switched to his back-up car, and David Ragan and Harvick had changed their engines.

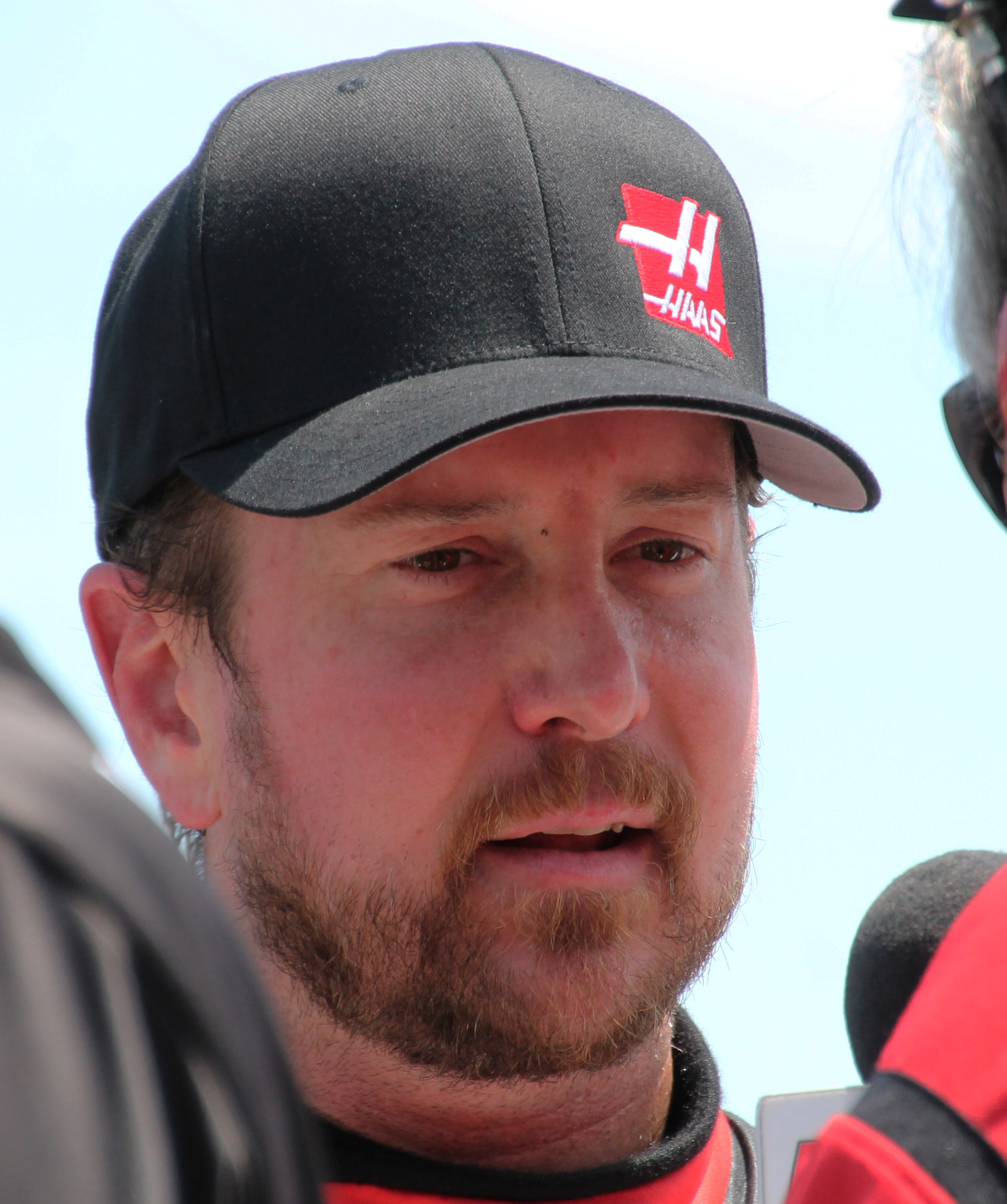
Kurt Busch (pictured in 2015), who led the race for 107 laps, more than any other driver

The race began at 5:52 p.m. Newman maintained his pole-position advantage heading into the first corner. After starting 21st, Jimmie Johnson moved to 15th position by lap eight. Kurt Busch passed teammate Newman for the lead three laps later. By the 20th lap, Kurt Busch, Newman, Earnhardt, Kenseth and Yeley were running in the top five positions. Earnhardt got ahead of Newman for second place four laps later. Hamlin moved to third position by lap 32. Hamlin made up a further position on lap 43 after he passed Earnhardt for second and was 1.2 seconds behind race leader Kurt Busch. The first caution of the race was shown four laps later when Biffle hit the turn two wall after his right-front tire had been cut and dropped debris on the track. Biffle's car sustained heavy damage to the right-hand side, ending his race. All drivers elected to make pit stops for tires and fuel during the caution.

Kurt Busch, who made a 10.4-second pit stop for fuel and no tires, maintained the lead on the lap-52 restart ahead of Hamlin, Kenseth, Earnhardt and Johnson. One lap later, a multi-car collision occurred on the front stretch when A. J. Allmendinger lost control of his car in turn two and collided with the right-rear quarter panel of Johnson's car, which had a cut left-rear tire that burst after leaving turn four. Johnson's burst tire caused Blaney and Stewart to collide after Stewart slowed to avoid a collision with Johnson. Both drivers slid, collecting Gilliland, Sadler, Juan Pablo Montoya, Green, Bowyer, Truex, Marlin, Johnny Sauter, Kyle Petty and Harvick, all of whom had damage to their cars. The incident triggered the race's second caution. Johnson and Stewart made pit stops to repair the damage to their cars; both rejoined the race in eighteenth and twenty-fifth positions.

Kurt Busch led on the lap-62 restart, ahead of Hamlin, Kenseth, Earnhardt, and Gordon. The third caution was prompted on the same lap when Tony Raines lost control of his car and slid sideways into Jeff Gordon, and both drivers were sent into the infield grass. Jeff Gordon went back up towards a right-hand wall and was hit by Allmendinger at the start-finish line, resulting in the former going airborne; Robby Gordon and Burton were also involved in the accident. Gordon was unhurt; drivers involved in the accidents, that caused the second and third cautions, made pit stops for repairs. Kurt Busch maintained his lead at the lap-70 restart, followed by Hamlin and Kenseth. Eight laps later, Burton caused the fourth caution after heavy contact with the turn three wall. During the caution, most of the leaders made pit stops; Newman stopped for a track bar adjustment and had a new shifter ball installed. Kurt Busch and Kenseth chose not to pit and remained the leaders at the lap-83 restart, with Rudd in third place. Ten laps later, Newman, who was in eighth position, reported his car was "extremely tight" after the adjustments made at his pit stop. Stewart had moved back to eleventh and Johnson was thirteenth by lap 96. Kurt Busch's lead was four seconds over Kenseth after 100 laps, with Brian Vickers following in third, Ragan fourth and Kyle Busch in fifth. Johnson passed Yeley for seventh position eleven laps later.

=== 112–Final lap ===
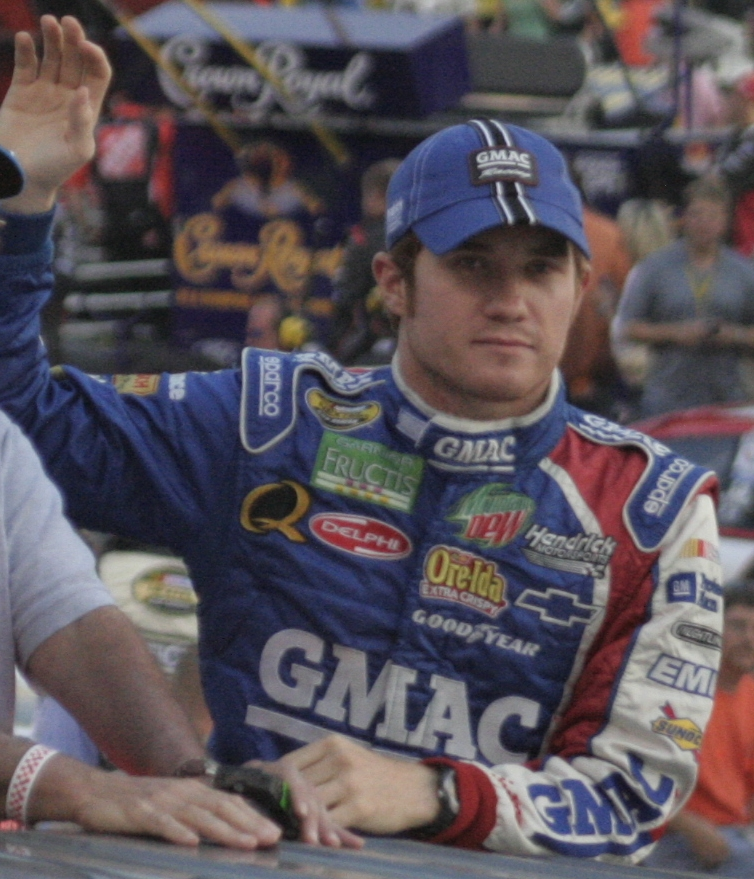
Brian Vickers (pictured in 2006) led the race after the first round of green-flag pit stops.

Green-flag pit stops began on lap 112, with Kenseth pitting on the same lap for tires and a wedge change. Kurt Busch made his stop two laps later, handing the lead to Vickers for twelve laps. Kyle Busch took the lead on lap 126 with an advantage of ten seconds over Johnson by lap 131. Kyle Busch made his pit stop on the next lap, handing the lead to Johnson for one lap. Stewart took the lead until his stop on lap 133, when Yeley became the race leader. Edwards and Elliott both held the lead in the next two laps. After the pit stops, Vickers regained the lead. On lap 140, Vickers' six-second lead was reduced to nothing when the fifth caution was triggered after debris was spotted on the backstretch. Most of the leaders elected to make pit stops. Mears was observed speeding, and was required by NASCAR to drop to the rear of the longest line.

Racing resumed on lap 146 with Vickers leading Kyle Busch, Earnhardt, Yeley and Stewart as daylight began to fade. Mears was afflicted with an alternator issue on lap 149, and switched to a back-up battery. A flat tire slowed Earnhardt on lap 154; he pitted for new tires two laps later. Ragan moved back into the top five by lap 160. Ten laps later, debris was spotted in the turn two groove, causing the sixth caution, during which all the leaders made pit stops. Vickers led on the lap-174 restart, followed by Kurt Busch and Martin. Kurt Busch drove left to pass Vickers for the lead on lap 175; three laps later, Newman drove to his garage to retire with an engine failure. Mears' team installed a new battery into his car, and switched between his main and back-up battery to ensure engine power was maintained. Vickers retook the lead from Kurt Busch on the 181st lap, and Stewart got ahead of Kyle Busch one lap later. Johnson took the lead from Vickers on lap 184.

On lap 185, Kurt Busch nudged the turn two wall with his right-rear side and spun on the backstretch, triggering the seventh caution. He regained control of his car to run in ninth place. Most of the leaders made pit stops. Johnson led at the lap-190 restart, followed by Vickers and Kenseth. Johnson held a one-second lead over Vickers by the 200th lap, by which time Edwards moved past Stewart. Vickers retook the lead from Johnson on lap 206. Fifteen laps later, the eighth caution was triggered when Edwards's car suffered a cut right-rear tire, slowed on the track and spun at turn four while driving cautiously to the pit road. Edwards collected his teammate, Ragan, who was run into by Elliott. Mears was close by the incident but avoided damaging his car. On lap 222, Vickers reported a power steering problem, and Kyle Busch was losing battery power. Most of the leaders, including Vickers, made pit stops. Kyle Busch's car had a replacement battery fitted and Vickers topped up with more fluids; both drivers rejoined in twelfth and thirteenth positions. Johnson led at the lap-227 restart, with Kenseth in second place. One lap later, Kenseth passed Johnson to take over first place, while Kyle Busch made heavy contact with the wall on his right side; a caution was not needed. Johnson reclaimed the first position from Kenseth on the backstretch on the 245th lap. Kyle Busch's right-front tire was cut, and went into the turn four wall on lap 252, triggering the ninth caution. During the caution, most of the leaders, including Johnson, chose to make pit stops. Johnson made changes to his car's left and right rear spring rubber, and Stewart's car's air pressure was adjusted.

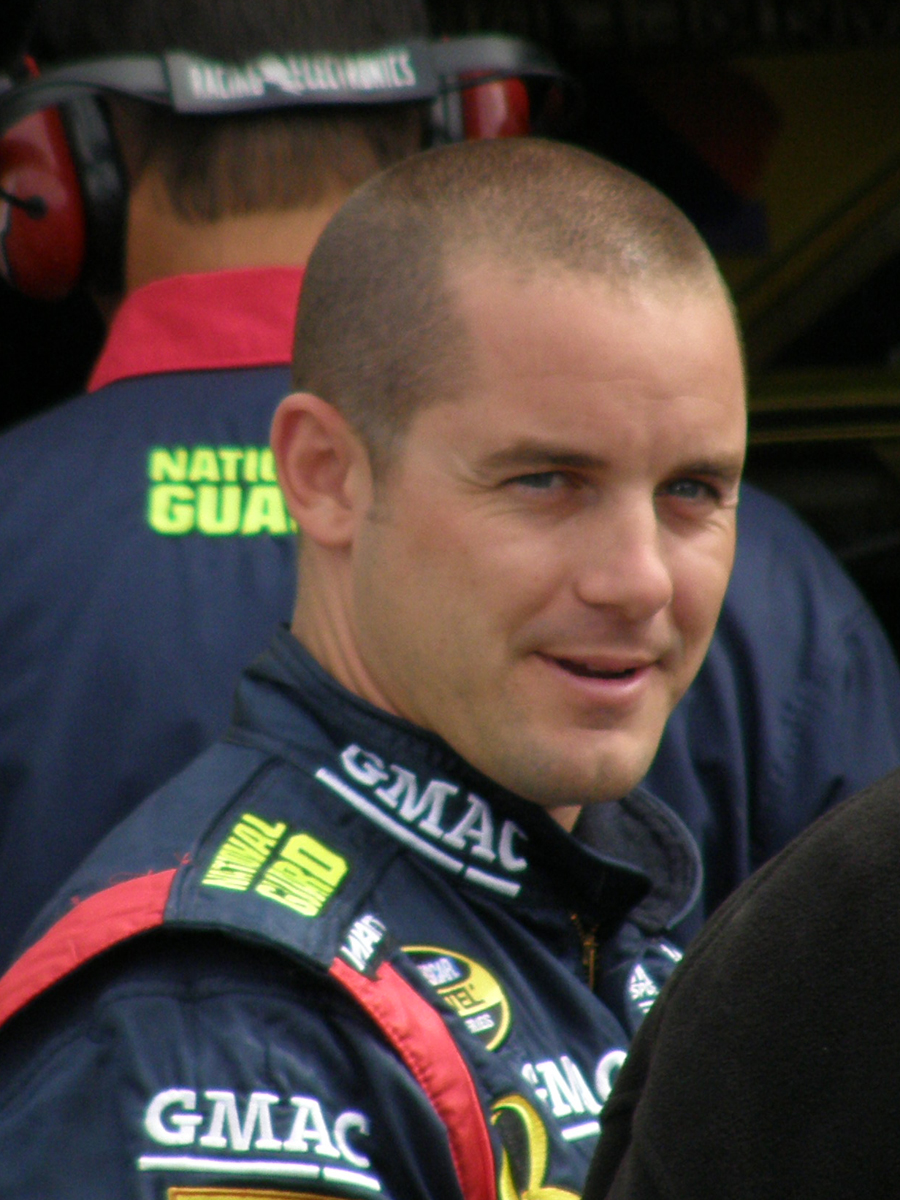
Casey Mears won the race which was his first and only win in the Nextel Cup Series.

Kyle Busch drove to his garage with a broken brake rotor on the 254th lap and Mayfield led the field back up to speed for the restart on the 256th lap, ahead of Kenseth, Vickers, Stewart and Johnson. Mayfield dropped to third place as Kenseth and Vickers moved into first and second places on lap 257. Kenseth held a 2.2-second lead over Stewart, who moved to second and was closing on Kenseth by lap 265. The race's tenth caution was triggered two laps later when Kahne lost control of his car and hit the turn two right-hand side wall. Most of the leaders, including Kenseth, elected to make pit stops. Johnson led the field on the lap-272 restart, followed by Kenseth and Stewart. Kenseth passed Johnson to reclaim the first position four laps later. Vickers and Rudd made contact while leaving the fourth turn on lap 281 but no caution was needed. Johnson retook the lead from Kenseth two laps later. Mayfield spun 360 degrees on the front stretch and went into the infield grass after trying to avoid a slower car on his right on lap 291, causing the eleventh caution. The leaders, including Johnson, made pit stops for tires under caution. Rudd took over the lead for one lap before making a pit stop on lap 293. Johnson regained the lead after the pit stops, maintaining it at the lap-297 restart; he was followed by Kenseth and Earnhardt. Kyle Busch rejoined the race on the same lap. Kurt Busch lost control of his car on the backstretch on lap 298; his car spun off and hit a left-hand wall, causing the twelfth caution. He drove to his garage to retire.

Kenseth led the field back up to speed at the lap-302 restart. Johnson retook the lead from Kenseth on the 311th lap. Stewart got ahead of Kenseth for second place on lap 314; he was six-tenths of a second behind race leader Johnson. After receiving a free pass from the tenth caution, Petty was running in ninth place by lap 316; he battled Reed Sorenson for eighth place. Fourteen laps later, Mears moved into third position. The thirteenth (and final) caution of the race was triggered on lap 337 when Vickers hit the turn two wall, damaging his car's right-hand side, sustaining a cut right-front tire and dropped debris onto the track. The leaders, including Johnson, made pit stops; Johnson's pit crew dropped a left-rear lug nut, costing him time while his mechanics searched for it, falling to tenth position. Stewart led the field on the lap-342 restart, ahead of Mears and Earnhardt. Johnson moved to fourth place by lap 367; three laps later, Stewart had a 1.1-second lead over Mears and extended it to 2.7 seconds by the 380th lap.

The second round of green-flag pit stops for fuel began on lap 381, as Earnhardt got past Mears for second place on the following lap. Mears lost third place to his teammate Johnson on lap 390. Johnson made his pit stop on the next lap and avoided a collision with Mears. Stewart drove slowly down the pit road on the 393rd lap because he was two laps short of fuel, allowing Earnhardt to move into first place before his own stop one lap later. Hamlin took over the lead before his pit stop on lap 395, allowing Mears to take over the first position. By lap 398, Mears held a ten-second lead over Yeley, who was closing the gap, and felt his car was tight when he drove right, but held a strong line at the track's bottom when he moved out of traffic. Mears conserved fuel after slowing his pace following persuasion by his crew chief Darian Grubb; he maintained his lead for the remaining two laps to win his first race in the Nextel Cup Series. He ran out of fuel on his cool-down lap; his engine cut out shortly after crossing the start-finish line. Yeley finished second, ahead of Petty in third, who secured his first top-five finish since the 1997 MBNA 400. Sorenson was fourth and Vickers came in fifth. Stewart, Rudd, Earnhardt, Hamlin and Johnson completed the top-ten finishers. The race had thirteen cautions and 29 lead changes among 15 drivers. Kurt Busch's total of 107 laps led was the highest of any competitor. Mears led for one period in the race, for a total of six laps.

=== Post-race comments ===
Mears appeared in Victory Lane to celebrate his first win in the Nextel Cup Series in front of the crowd; the win earned him US$377,425 and is his only career win as of 2022. Mears was delighted with his victory, saying in the post-race press conference, "This is unbelievable. I'm very, very excited about it and, at the same time, very relieved. I was afraid Darian [Grubb] was going to call me in. I'm glad he didn't. The only way we could win was to gamble and that's what we did." Mears said he had "a fourth place car at best". It was the first time since 1991 a person with the surname Mears had won in auto racing. Yeley, who finished second, said, "This is probably the first time in two years of Cup racing I didn't catch the bad break. I've always run into bad luck.", and, "At the end, we were a top-five car at best". Third-place finisher Petty said, "In all honesty, it's just a race. We didn't change the world tonight. It feels good to come back and race with these guys. I guess third place was just the cherry on the sundae." He also said he had a car that was capable of finishing in the top ten and that he would not have been able to run with the top drivers. Petty also praised Mears for his victory and said he felt Mears would have similar success in the future. Hamlin said he felt the top-five finishers were lucky to achieve their finishing positions and that his crew chief Mike Ford said there was "no glory in winning a fuel-mileage race, other than saying you didn't run hard and were saving fuel".

Kurt Busch, who led 107 laps (more than any other driver) was frustrated after his lap-298 crash: "How in the world we can be so strong during the day here and almost in an instant go completely in the opposite direction is beyond my comprehension. We have to get a handle on it sooner or later. I'm frustrated and down right now, but we'll just keep plugging along looking for the answer." Newman, who led the first ten laps of the race, was happy despite retiring from the race: "We had a good car. We had just gotten the lucky dog and we were going to be one of the 15 cars on the lead lap. Everybody at Penske Racing has been doing a great job. We've just got to keep it up and stay focused." After finishing the race in fifth place (then the best finish for a Toyota car) Vickers said it was "rough" driving without the use of power steering that cut in and out but he felt Red Bull Racing Team had "the best car" for the race. Stewart's crew chief Greg Zipadelli was disappointed his driver could not take the victory: "If we hadn't had an opportunity to win, I'd say that finishing sixth and leading laps would be awesome, But sitting where we are right now, it seems that everything is stacked against us. We were probably a second- or third-place car at worst, so it's disappointing." Eighth-place finisher Earnhardt said he thought he secured a second-place finish and was unaware the leaders had made pit stops. Nevertheless, he said was happy with the way his team ran the race.

After retiring from the race on lap 221, Elliott blamed himself for the collision with Ragan, saying he waited too long to react and was heavily committed to driving down the racetrack. He was also unable to remove his foot from his brake pedal. Ragan said he felt he should have passed Roush Fenway Racing teammate Edwards, who spun up the racetrack. Edwards also said he was trying to avoid wrecking himself. According to Montoya, who was involved in the multi-car collision on the 53rd lap: "I saw a car flying, and as soon as I saw the car flying I checked up. We actually slowed down the car and everything. The ten car or somebody came right in behind us and just pushed us through the whole mess." Jeff Gordon said he was "fine" after the accident and that it "looked a lot worse than it really was ... Unfortunate because, man, what an awesome race car we had. I was so proud of Steve Letarte and the guys. When we bring race cars like that to the track, it just makes me have a whole lot of fun. I was having a blast out there and I hate we are out of it. But I am ok." Allmendinger claimed responsibility for causing the crash and asked his spotter to apologize to Johnson's spotter, who relayed the message to Johnson via radio.

The result maintained Jeff Gordon's lead in the Drivers' Championship with 1,921 points, ahead of teammate Johnson with 1,789. Kenseth remained in third with his points advantage over Hamlin reduced to thirty-two. Burton remained in fifth place and Stewart kept sixth. Harvick moved to seventh while Edwards gained two positions to eighth. Kurt Busch's non-finish dropped him to ninth and Bowyer was tenth. Kyle Busch and McMurray were 11th and 12th. In the Manufacturers' Championship, Chevrolet with 105 points extended its lead to forty-two points over its main rival Ford. Dodge in fourth increased its points advantage over Toyota in fourth. The race took four hours, thirty-six minutes and twenty-seven seconds to complete, and the margin of victory was 9.561 seconds.

=== Race results ===
Race results
Pos	Grid	Car	Driver	Team	Manufacturer	Laps run	Points
1	16	25	Casey Mears	Hendrick Motorsports	Chevrolet	400	190^{1}
2	12	18	J. J. Yeley	Joe Gibbs Racing	Chevrolet	400	175^{1}
3	36	45	Kyle Petty	Petty Enterprises	Dodge	400	165
4	34	41	Reed Sorenson	Chip Ganassi Racing	Dodge	400	160
5	26	83	Brian Vickers	Red Bull Racing Team	Toyota	400	160^{1}
6	14	20	Tony Stewart	Joe Gibbs Racing	Chevrolet	400	155^{1}
7	7	88	Ricky Rudd	Robert Yates Racing	Ford	400	151^{1}
8	4	8	Dale Earnhardt Jr.	Dale Earnhardt, Inc.	Chevrolet	400	147^{1}
9	6	11	Denny Hamlin	Joe Gibbs Racing	Chevrolet	400	143^{1}
10	21	48	Jimmie Johnson	Hendrick Motorsports	Chevrolet	400	139^{1}
11	11	01	Mark Martin	Ginn Racing	Chevrolet	400	130
12	5	17	Matt Kenseth	Roush Fenway Racing	Ford	400	132^{1}
13	9	43	Bobby Labonte	Petty Enterprises	Dodge	399	124
14	37	96	Tony Raines	Hall of Fame Racing	Chevrolet	399	121
15	39	99	Carl Edwards	Roush Fenway Racing	Ford	399	123^{1}
16	31	1	Martin Truex Jr.	Dale Earnhardt, Inc.	Chevrolet	399	115
17	10	40	David Stremme	Chip Ganassi Racing	Dodge	397	112
18	8	22	Dave Blaney	Bill Davis Racing	Toyota	397	109
19	28	26	Jamie McMurray	Roush Fenway Racing	Ford	395	106
20	15	10	Scott Riggs	Evernham Motorsports	Dodge	394	103
21	27	29	Kevin Harvick	Richard Childress Racing	Chevrolet	394	100
22	35	7	Robby Gordon	Robby Gordon Motorsports	Ford	393	97
23	18	9	Kasey Kahne	Evernham Motorsports	Dodge	390	94
24	25	31	Jeff Burton	Richard Childress Racing	Chevrolet	385	91
25	24	36	Jeremy Mayfield	Bill Davis Racing	Toyota	382	93^{1}
26	33	13	Joe Nemechek	Ginn Racing	Chevrolet	377	85
27	40	70	Johnny Sauter	Haas CNC Racing	Chevrolet	376	82
28	20	42	Juan Pablo Montoya	Chip Ganassi Racing	Dodge	369	79
29	41	07	Clint Bowyer	Richard Childress Racing	Chevrolet	367	76
30	17	5	Kyle Busch	Hendrick Motorsports	Chevrolet	357	78^{1}
31	29	84	A. J. Allmendinger	Red Bull Racing Team	Toyota	310	70
32	2	2	Kurt Busch	Penske Racing South	Dodge	296	77^{2}
33	30	14	Sterling Marlin	Ginn Racing	Chevrolet	293	64
34	43	78	Kenny Wallace	Furniture Row Racing	Chevrolet	289	61
35	19	38	David Gilliland	Robert Yates Racing	Ford	265	58
36	3	19	Elliott Sadler	Evernham Motorsports	Dodge	261	55
37	13	6	David Ragan	Roush Fenway Racing	Ford	219	52
38	22	21	Bill Elliott	Wood Brothers Racing	Ford	218	54^{1}
39	1	12	Ryan Newman	Penske Racing South	Dodge	172	51^{1}
40	23	44	Dale Jarrett	Michael Waltrip Racing	Toyota	82	43
41	32	24	Jeff Gordon	Hendrick Motorsports	Chevrolet	61	40
42	42	66	Jeff Green	Haas CNC Racing	Chevrolet	52	37
43	38	16	Greg Biffle	Roush Fenway Racing	Ford	45	34
^{1} Includes five bonus points for leading a lap
^{2} Includes ten bonus points for leading the most laps

== Standings after the race ==
Drivers' Championship standings

Pos	+/–	Driver	Points
1		Jeff Gordon	1,921
2		Jimmie Johnson	1,789 (−132)
3		Matt Kenseth	1,714 (−207)
4		Denny Hamlin	1,682 (−239)
5		Jeff Burton	1,577 (−344)
6		Tony Stewart	1,530 (−391)
7	1	Kevin Harvick	1,415 (−506)
8	2	Carl Edwards	1,414 (−507)
9	2	Kurt Busch	1,402 (−519)
10	1	Clint Bowyer	1,378 (−543)
11		Kyle Busch	1,359 (−562)
12		Jamie McMurray	1,320 (−601)

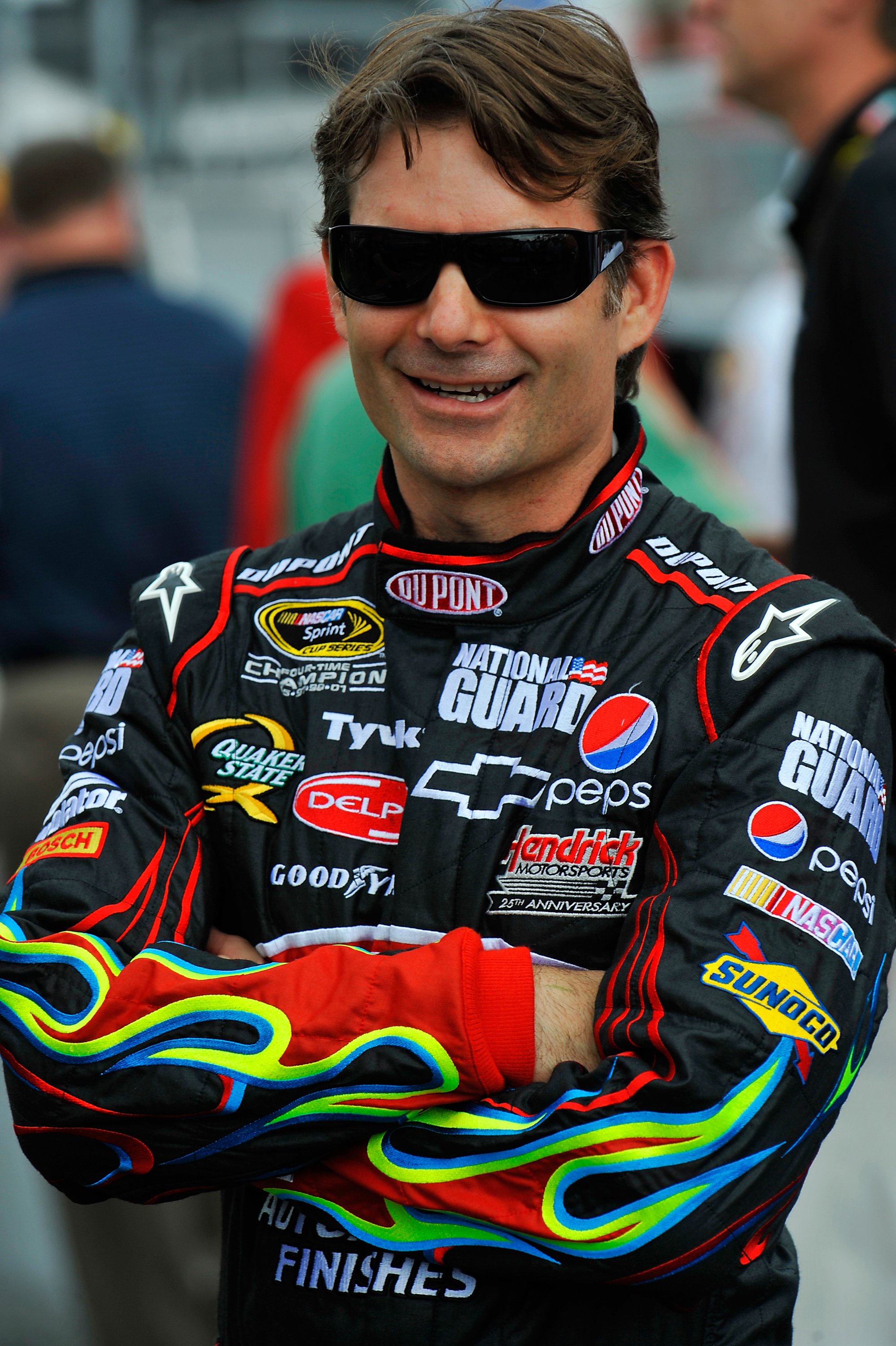
Jeff Gordon (pictured in 2009) remained the points leader after the race.

Manufacturers' Championship standings

Pos	+/–	Manufacturer	Points
1		Chevrolet	105
2		Ford	65 (−40)
3		Dodge	58 (−47)
4		Toyota	37 (−68)

- Note: Only the top twelve positions are included for the driver standings.

Previous race: 2007 Dodge Avenger 500	Nextel Cup Series; 2007 season	Next race: 2007 Autism Speaks 400
