= 2006 Bank of America 500 =

31st stock car race of the 2006 NASCAR Nextel Cup Series

Race details
- Race 31 of 36 in the 2006 NASCAR Nextel Cup Series
- 2006 Bank of America 500 program cover, with artwork made by NASCAR artist Sam Bass. The painting is called "For Those About to Rock!"
- Date: October 14, 2006
- Location: Lowe's Motor Speedway, Concord, North Carolina, US
- Course: Permanent racing facility
- Course length: 1.5 miles (2.4 km)
- Distance: 334 laps, 501 mi (806.281 km)
- Weather: Temperatures up to 64.4 °F (18.0 °C); wind speeds up to 10.24 mph (16.48 km/h)
- Average speed: 132.142 mph (212.662 km/h)
- Attendance: 170,000

Pole position
Driver	Scott Riggs	Evernham Motorsports
- Time: 28.203

Most laps led
Driver	Kasey Kahne	Evernham Motorsports
- Laps: 134

Winner
No. 9	Kasey Kahne	Evernham Motorsports

Television in the United States
- Network: NBC
- Announcers: Bill Weber, Benny Parsons, Wally Dallenbach Jr.
- Nielsen ratings: 4.7/8 (Final); 4.1/7 (Overnight)

Radio in the United States
- Radio: Performance Racing Network
- Booth announcers: Mark Garrow, Doug Rice
- Turn announcers: Chuck Carland, Rob Albright

The 2006 Bank of America 500 was the 31st stock car race of the 2006 NASCAR Nextel Cup Series and the fifth in the ten-race season-ending Chase for the Nextel Cup. It was held on October 14, 2006, before a crowd of 175,000 in Concord, North Carolina, United States, at Lowe's Motor Speedway. The circuit is an intermediate that holds NASCAR races. The 334-lap race was won by Kasey Kahne of the Evernham Motorsports team, who started from second position. Hendrick Motorsports' Jimmie Johnson finished second and Richard Childress Racing driver Jeff Burton was third.

Burton led the Drivers' Championship by six points over Matt Kenseth going into the race. Although Scott Riggs won the pole position by setting the fastest lap time in the qualifying session, he was immediately passed by teammate Kahne at the start of the race. Riggs regained first place twelve laps later, only to lose it to Tony Raines on the 19th lap. Riggs retook the lead on lap 31 and maintained it for the following 16 laps until he was passed by Dale Earnhardt Jr. who led for the next 31 laps. Kahne moved back into the first position on lap 96, with Raines reclaiming the lead on the 123rd lap. Kahne passed Raines to move back into the lead 15 laps later. Johnson moved into the lead on lap 168 and held the position for a total of 72 laps. At the race's final restart on lap 307, Johnson led until he was passed two laps later by Kahne who maintained it to win the race. There were ten cautions and 34 lead changes by thirteen different drivers.

The victory was Kahne's sixth of the season, and the seventh of his career since he debuted in 2004. After the race, Burton maintained his lead in the Drivers' Championship, which increased to 45 points over Kenseth in second position. Kahne's victory moved him from ninth to eighth, while Jeff Gordon dropped from seventh to tenth because he failed to score enough points due to an engine failure in the race's closing laps. Chevrolet maintained its lead in the Manufacturers' Championship, 48 points in front of Dodge and 54 ahead of Ford with five races left in the season.

== Background ==
Lowe's Motor Speedway, where the race was held

The Bank of America 500 was the 31st of 36 scheduled stock car races of the 2006 NASCAR Nextel Cup Series, and the fifth in the ten-race season-ending Chase for the Nextel Cup. It ran for a total of 334 laps over a distance of 501 mi (806 km), and was held on October 14, 2006, in Concord, North Carolina, at Lowe's Motor Speedway, an intermediate track. The layout used was a four-turn, 1.5-mile (2.4 km)-long, asphalt quad-oval track. The track's turns are banked at 24 degrees; both the front stretch (the location of the finish line) and the back stretch (opposite the front) have a five-degree banking.

Before the race, Jeff Burton led the Drivers' Championship with 5,598 points, with Matt Kenseth sixth points behind in second, and Mark Martin was a further four adrift in third. Kevin Harvick and Denny Hamlin were fourth and fifth. Dale Earnhardt Jr., Jeff Gordon, Jimmie Johnson, Kasey Kahne, and Kyle Busch rounded out the top ten drivers competing in the 2006 Chase for the Nextel Cup. Johnson was the race's defending champion. Chevrolet was leading the Manufacturers' Championship with 231 points; Dodge was second with 170, and Ford was a close third with 169. NASCAR mandated that teams use a 13.8-US-gallon (52 L; 11.5 imp gal) fuel cell for the second time in the season so there would be fewer laps between pit stops and more tire changes could occur. Tire supplier Goodyear brought a supply of new right-hand tires, which were tested at the track on August 29 by drivers Joe Nemechek and Kurt Busch. The duo believed Goodyear had rectified problems with harder-compound tires that had been raised at the previous round at Charlotte (the Coca-Cola 600).

After he was rammed by his teammate Brian Vickers in the preceding UAW-Ford 500, Johnson said the expectations for him to succeed at Lowe's Motor Speedway were high and hoped the track's surface would be more predictable than the last race at Charlotte. Martin said he was in the best position he had been in for several years to win the championship, and spoke of his waning interest in looking at race results. Having secured one top-ten finish in the season's first four Chase for the Nextel Cup races, Earnhardt stated he needed to secure a top-five finishing position and was determined to get his team more involved in the championship battle. Gordon had driven well at the circuit, but without finishing. His team brought the car he drove to victory in the season's 18th race at Chicagoland Speedway. Gordon felt it would help him at intermediate tracks and return him to championship contention. Although Kahne had a poor start in the Chase, he rectified this by finishing second at Talladega Superspeedway. He believed the momentum would be carried into Charlotte and stated he would push hard to win races.

One team made its début at the race. Red Bull Racing Team elected to start operations early as part of a warm-up exercise to running a full-time schedule in the 2007 season with the 1988 NASCAR Winston Cup Series champion Bill Elliott driving the No. 83 car. Elliott would attempt to qualify the car at three races towards the end of the year. He said his decision to join Red Bull was because of the organization's willingness to become competitive. Elliott said he was required to qualify the car for the race and then move up the field and provide input that would allow the team to be prepared for the 2007 Daytona 500.

== Practice and qualification ==
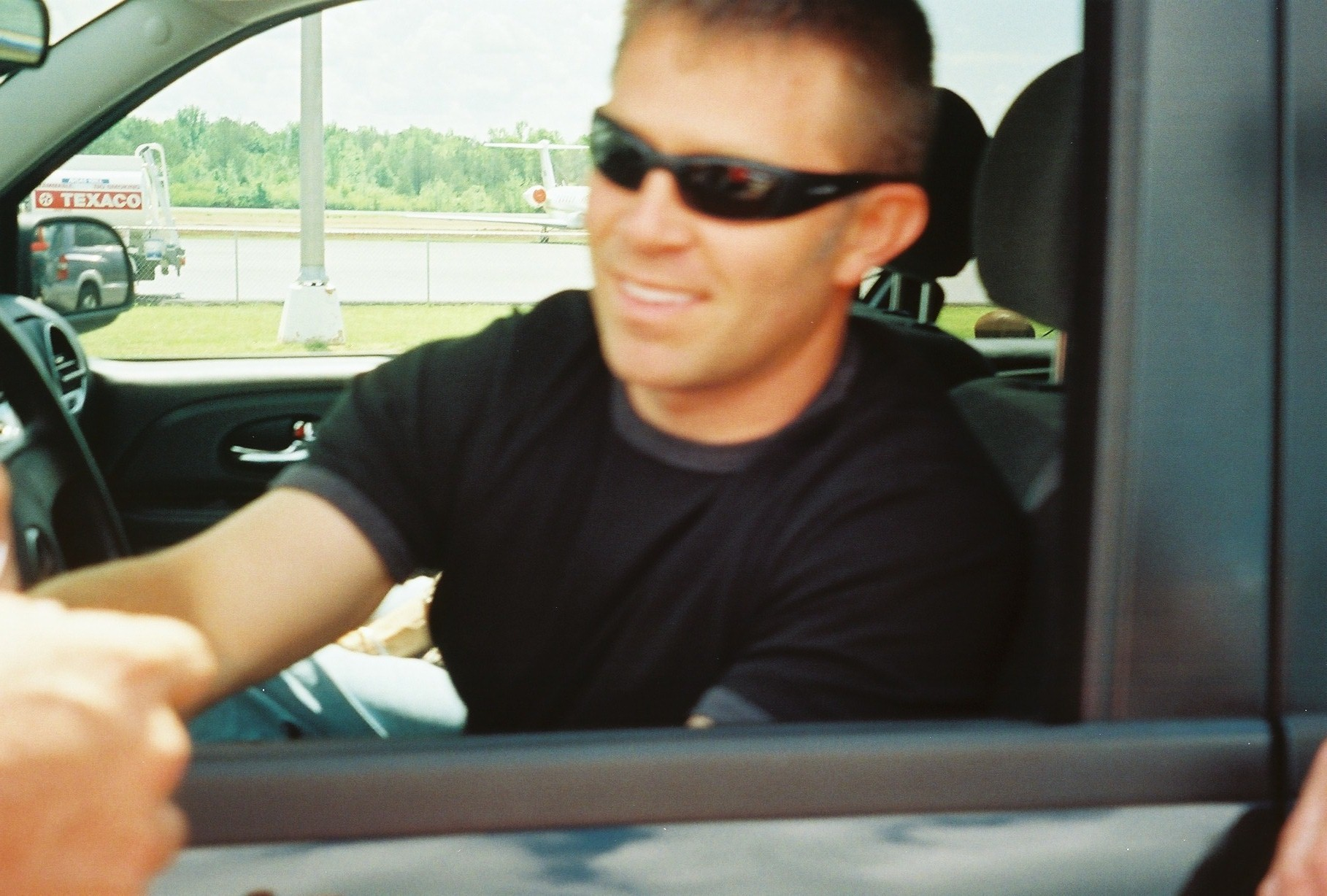
Scott Riggs (pictured in 2008) had the third pole position of his career.

Three practice sessions were held before the Sunday race, one each on Thursday, Friday and Saturday. The first practice session lasted 90 minutes, the second 60 minutes, and the third 50 minutes. Kahne set the fastest time in the first practice session with a lap of 28.834 seconds; Scott Riggs, Kurt Busch, Elliott Sadler, Martin, Johnson, Nemechek, Martin Truex Jr., Jeff Green, and Hamlin rounded out the session's top-ten fastest drivers.

A total of 52 cars were entered in the qualifier, according to NASCAR's qualifying procedure, only 43 could race. Each driver was limited to two timed laps, with the starting order determined by the competitor's fastest times. Riggs clinched the third pole position of his career, and his third consecutive at Lowe's Motor Speedway, with a fastest time of 28.203 seconds. He was joined on the grid's front row by Kahne, his Evernham Motorsports teammate, who held the pole position until Riggs' lap. Kurt Busch originally qualified in third, but his car's right-rear shock absorber was found to have violated NASCAR regulations during the post-qualifying inspection because it did not bounce back. Busch was required to start from 42nd position after using a provisional. Hence, Casey Mears inherited third, Sadler fourth, and Harvick fifth. Burton, Martin, Clint Bowyer, Reed Sorenson and Johnson rounded out the top ten qualifiers. Kenseth, a Chase for the Nextel Cup driver, qualified eleventh, while Earnhardt took 16th and Kyle Busch 18th. The nine drivers who failed to qualify were Elliott, Kevin Lepage, Derrike Cope, Chad Chaffin, Hermie Sadler, Kirk Shelmerdine, Kenny Wallace (who crashed on his first timed lap), Morgan Shepherd (who withdrew due to a lack of preparation), and Carl Long (who crashed while attempting to record a timed lap). After the qualifier, Riggs said his team knew his car was decent and revealed that they wanted to get back into a rhythm of starting and finishing in a top position.

On Friday afternoon Kyle Busch was fastest in the second practice session with a time of 29.378 seconds, ahead of Kahne and Robby Gordon. Bowyer was fourth-fastest; Johnson was fifth and Truex sixth. Greg Biffle, Kurt Busch, Burton, and Martin followed in the top ten. Of the other drivers in the Chase, Edwards was eleventh-fastest, Hamlin set the twelfth-fastest time, and Harvick was fifteenth. Ryan Newman crashed and switched to a back-up car. Later, on Saturday afternoon, Earnhardt led the final practice session with a time of 29.357; Kyle Busch, Hamlin, Kahne, Johnson, Bowyer. Biffle, Truex, Riggs, and Robby Gordon made up positions two through ten. Other Chase drivers included Jeff Gordon in 13th and Burton in 15th; all were within three-tenths of a second of Earnhardt's time.

=== Qualifying results ===
Grid	Car	Driver	Team	Manufacturer	Time	Speed
1	10	Scott Riggs	Evernham Motorsports	Dodge	28.203	191.469
2	9	Kasey Kahne	Evernham Motorsports	Dodge	28.392	190.194
3	42	Casey Mears	Chip Ganassi Racing	Dodge	28.479	189.613
4	19	Elliott Sadler	Evernham Motorsports	Dodge	28.568	189.023
5	29	Kevin Harvick	Richard Childress Racing	Chevrolet	28.611	188.739
6	31	Jeff Burton	Richard Childress Racing	Chevrolet	28.636	188.574
7	6	Mark Martin	Roush Racing	Ford	28.636	188.574
8	07	Clint Bowyer	Richard Childress Racing	Chevrolet	28.650	188.482
9	41	Reed Sorenson	Chip Ganassi Racing	Dodge	28.687	188.239
10	48	Jimmie Johnson	Hendrick Motorsports	Chevrolet	28.694	188.193
11	17	Matt Kenseth	Roush Racing	Ford	28.747	187.846
12	40	David Stremme	Chip Ganassi Racing	Dodge	28.749	187.833
13	14	Sterling Marlin	MB2 Motorsport	Chevrolet	28.760	187.761
14	4	Todd Bodine	Morgan-McClure Motorsports	Chevrolet	28.765	187.728
15	12	Ryan Newman	Penske Racing South	Dodge	28.772	187.682^{1}
16	8	Dale Earnhardt Jr.	Dale Earnhardt, Inc.	Chevrolet	28.802	187.487
17	21	Ken Schrader	Wood Brothers Racing	Ford	28.832	187.292
18	5	Kyle Busch	Hendrick Motorsports	Chevrolet	28.833	187.285
19	7	Robby Gordon	Robby Gordon Motorsports	Chevrolet	28.845	187.208
20	66	Jeff Green	Haas CNC Racing	Chevrolet	28.849	187.182
21	43	Bobby Labonte	Petty Enterprises	Dodge	28.861	187.104
22	11	Denny Hamlin	Joe Gibbs Racing	Chevrolet	28.867	187.065
23	55	Michael Waltrip	Waltrip-Jasper Racing	Dodge	28.880	186.981
24	49	Mike Bliss	BAM Racing	Dodge	28.896	186.877
25	25	Brian Vickers	Hendrick Motorsports	Chevrolet	28.923	186.703
26	1	Martin Truex Jr.	Dale Earnhardt, Inc.	Chevrolet	28.925	186.690
27	26	Jamie McMurray	Roush Racing	Ford	28.929	186.664
28	99	Carl Edwards	Roush Racing	Ford	28.939	186.599
29	72	Mike Skinner	CJM Racing	Chevrolet	28.961	186.458
30	01	Joe Nemechek	Ginn Racing	Chevrolet	28.965	186.432
31	20	Tony Stewart	Joe Gibbs Racing	Chevrolet	28.982	186.322
32	45	Kyle Petty	Petty Enterprises	Dodge	29.009	186.149
33	16	Greg Biffle	Roush Racing	Ford	29.027	186.034
34	88	Dale Jarrett	Robert Yates Racing	Ford	29.055	185.854
35	38	David Gilliland	Robert Yates Racing	Ford	29.072	185.746
36	22	Dave Blaney	Bill Davis Racing	Dodge	29.093	185.612
37	06	Todd Kluever	Roush Racing	Ford	29.119	185.446
38	32	Travis Kvapil	PPI Motorsports	Chevrolet	29.122	185.427
39	96	Tony Raines	Hall of Fame Racing	Chevrolet	29.149	185.255
40	18	J. J. Yeley	Joe Gibbs Racing	Chevrolet	29.237	184.697
41	24	Jeff Gordon	Hendrick Motorsports	Chevrolet	29.492	183.100
42	2	Kurt Busch	Penske Racing South	Dodge	28.462	189.713^{2}
43	44	Terry Labonte	Hendrick Motorsports	Chevrolet	Champion's Provisional	
Failed to qualify
44	83	Bill Elliott	Red Bull Racing Team	Dodge	29.131	185.370
45	34	Kevin Lepage	Front Row Motorsports	Chevrolet	29.182	185.076
46	74	Derrike Cope	McGlynn Racing	Dodge	29.301	184.294
47	61	Chad Chaffin	Front Row Motorsports	Dodge	29.316	184.200
48	00	Hermie Sadler	MBA Racing	Chevrolet	29.886	180.687
49	27	Kirk Shelmerdine	Kirk Shelmerdine Racing	Chevrolet	31.667	170.525
50	78	Kenny Wallace	Furniture Row Racing	Chevrolet	–	–
51	89	Morgan Shepherd	Shepherd Racing Ventures	Dodge	–	–
52	46	Carl Long	Cupp Motorsports	Dodge	–	–
^{1} Moved to the back of the field for switching to a back-up car^{2} Moved from third to forty-second because of a car infringement

== Race ==
=== Opening laps ===
Live television coverage of the race on NBC began at 7:04 p.m. Eastern Daylight Time. Around the start of the race, weather conditions were sunny with an air temperature of 64 °F (18 °C) which was forecast to drop as the event progressed. Dr. William K. Thierfelder, president of Belmont Abbey College in Belmont, North Carolina, began pre-race ceremonies with an invocation. American Idol contestant and country music singer Kellie Pickler performed the national anthem, and Mickey Jackson, the winner of a sponsored Grand Marshal contest, along with his five-year-old son Kalob, commanded the drivers to start their engines. During the pace laps, Ryan Newman moved to the rear of the field because he switched to a back-up car.

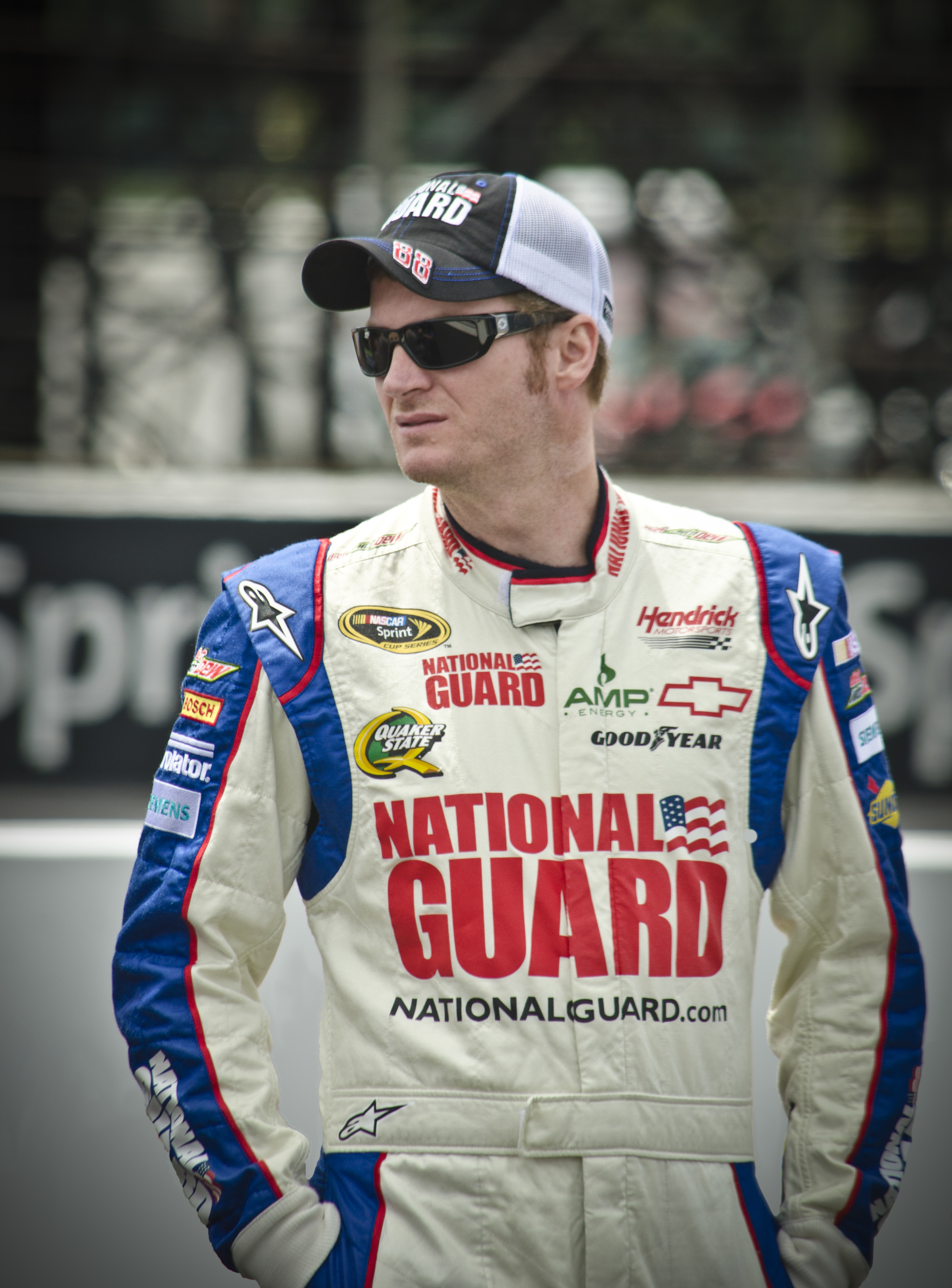
Dale Earnhardt Jr. (pictured in 2012) led a total of 37 laps.

The race started at 7:21 pm. Kahne accelerated faster than teammate Riggs off the line and was ahead of him by the second turn. The first caution of the race was given one lap later when Todd Bodine collided with Robby Gordon in the tri-oval. Gordon slid but regained control of his car with Bodine slowing. This triggered a multi-car accident: Mike Bliss hit the rear of Hamlin's car, sending him spinning down the front stretch, which then involved Mike Skinner, Truex, Jamie McMurray, Kyle Petty, J. J. Yeley, Travis Kvapil, David Gilliland, Tony Stewart, Kurt Busch, Newman, and Nemechek. The incident blocked the track temporarily. Hamlin drove back to his garage where his team repaired his car. Kahne led the field at the lap-nine restart, followed by Riggs and Mears. As the field drove through the first turn, a caution was issued immediately, because three safety vehicles were on the track as crew members did not hear there would be another lap added before racing resumed. All laps were counted towards the first caution.

Several cars elected to make pit stops under caution. Stewart made repairs to his car's body which had been damaged in the lap two crash. Kahne maintained the top position at the lap twelve restart, with teammate Riggs in second. Riggs reclaimed the first position from Kahne on the 13th lap; after starting from 41st, Jeff Gordon moved up to 22nd position by lap 15. Two laps later, Dave Blaney spun after leaving turn four and hit the outside barrier with his car's left-rear quarter, triggering the second caution. Most of the field, including Riggs, chose to make pit stops for fuel and tires. Tony Raines decided not to make a pit stop and led the field back up to speed at the lap-22 restart, ahead of Newman, McMurray, Terry Labonte, and Riggs. On the 23rd lap, Riggs and Kahne got ahead of Labonte for fourth and fifth positions. Riggs passed McMurray for third one lap later, and Kahne got ahead of McMurray for fourth on lap 25. Newman fell to fourth place when Riggs and Kahne passed him two laps later. Riggs passed Raines for the lead on the 30th lap, while Kahne moved into second place. Truex hit the wall on the same lap but no caution was shown.

On lap 33, Sorenson ran into the rear of Dale Jarrett's car, which spun backwards into the turn four wall, prompting the third caution. Jarrett retired from the race when he drove into his garage. All drivers elected to make pit stops for fuel under caution. Riggs maintained his lead at the lap-39 restart, followed by Kahne and Bowyer. Johnson got ahead of Sadler to move into eighth on lap 44. On lap 46, a fourth caution was given; after leaving turn two, Todd Kluever was hit by teammate Greg Biffle and spun on the backstretch, causing Ken Schrader and Petty to collide with Kluever. Michael Waltrip hit the wall in avoidance. Most drivers (including Riggs) chose to make pit stops for fuel. Earnhardt led at the lap-53 restart with the non-stopping cars of Edwards, Newman, Biffle and Sorenson following him. Riggs moved back into third place on lap 59 after passing Biffle and Newman. By lap 66, Earnhardt held a 1.78-second advantage over Edwards. Two laps later, Riggs passed Edwards to take over second place. Riggs closed the gap to Earnhardt and was 1.5 seconds behind by lap 75. Green-flag pit stops began three laps later, with Earnhardt stopping on lap 79, giving the lead back to Riggs. Kahne and Riggs made pit stops on the 85th lap for scuffed right-hand tires.

=== Mid-distance ===
After the pit stops, which concluded on lap 91, Riggs reclaimed the first position. Kahne closed the gap to teammate Riggs, who was holding a lead of four-tenths of a second, by lap 95. One lap later, Kahne passed Riggs (who complained his car had too much understeer) for first place. Earnhardt moved into second when he passed Riggs on the 100th lap. Lap 105 saw the fifth caution; Waltrip lost control of his car and hit the turn four outside wall, causing him to spin while attempting to make a pit stop for fuel. During the caution, all drivers again made pit stops. Kahne maintained the lead at the lap-110 restart, followed by Earnhardt and Bowyer. Gordon passed Bowyer to claim third position one lap later. Bowyer lost two further positions when Burton and Johnson overtook him on the 115th lap. A sixth caution was prompted on the following lap when Kurt Busch spun leaving turn two and hit the inside wall on the backstretch; while attempting to avoid Busch, Sorenson lost control in turn two and went towards the inside backstretch wall. Most of the leaders, including Kahne, made pit stops for fuel. Harvick and Kahne avoided a collision on pit road. Sadler led the field at the lap-121 restart, followed by Raines and Robby Gordon. Raines passed Sadler to reclaim the lead two laps later, while Sadler drove back to pit road with engine problems on lap 125.

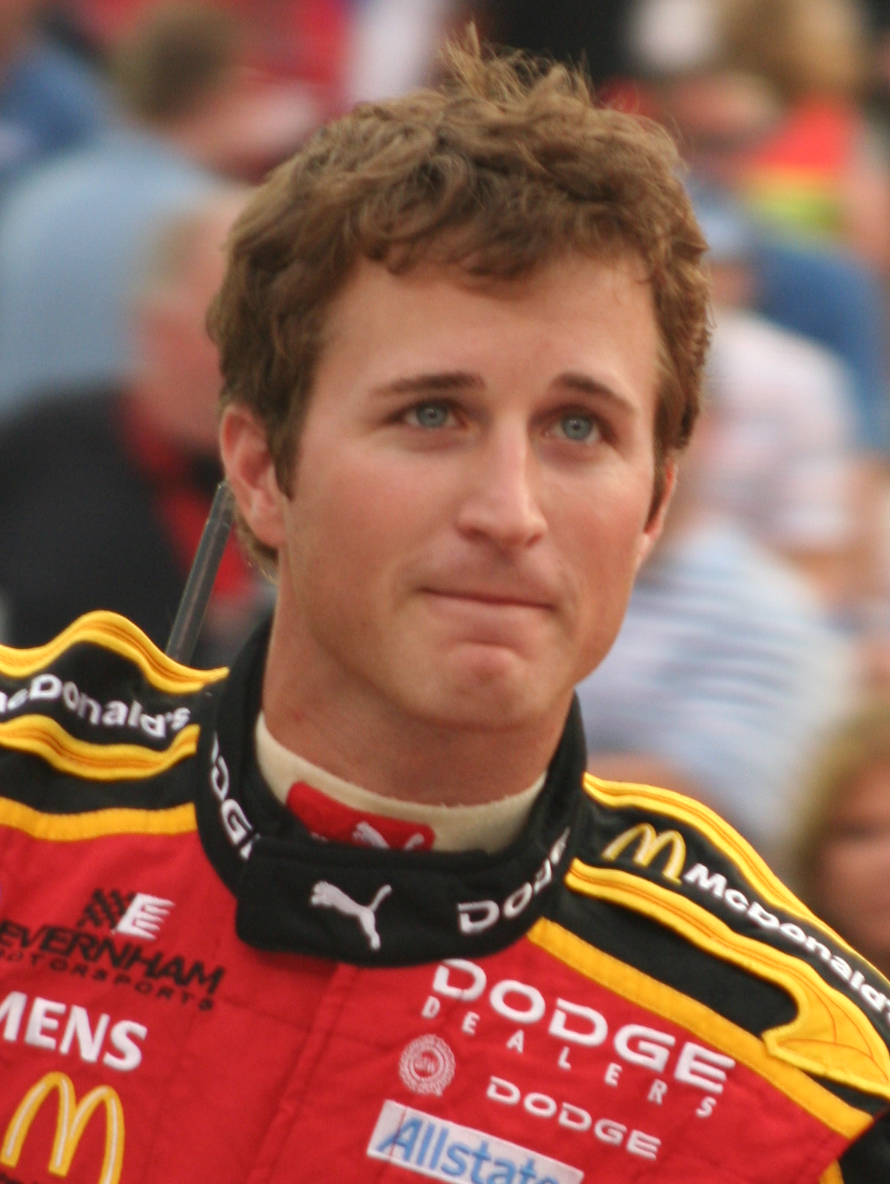
Kasey Kahne (pictured in 2007) won the race after passing Jimmie Johnson with twenty-four laps remaining.

Kahne moved up into second place by lap 132 after passing Jeff Gordon, Earnhardt, and Robby Gordon. Johnson got ahead of Robby Gordon for fourth place one lap later. Kahne returned to the lead after passing Raines on the backstretch on lap 138, while Johnson moved into second on the following lap. The second round of green-flag pit stops commenced on lap 143 when Robby Gordon made a pit stop for right-side tires and car adjustments. Kahne and Riggs stopped on lap 154. Jeff Gordon and Johnson made similar stops over the next three laps. Following the pit stops, Kahne reclaimed the lead after battling with Raines. A seventh caution was given on lap 163 when Gilliland spun in turn two and contacted the inside wall heavily. He drove to his garage to retire. Most of the leaders, including Kahne, made pit stops. Sterling Marlin stayed out and led at the lap-168 restart, ahead of Johnson. That same lap, Marlin lost the lead when Johnson passed him on the backstretch, and Kahne moved ahead of Marlin for second on lap 169. Martin got ahead of Earnhardt for fifth position ten laps later. By lap 180, Johnson held a 1.4-second lead over Kahne. Gordon passed Martin for third on lap 182, while Edwards overtook Kyle Busch for seventh two laps later. At the front, Kahne closed the gap to be six-tenths of a second behind Johnson by the 188th lap.

=== Final laps ===
The third round of green-flag pit stops began on lap 199; Johnson stopped on lap 203, while Earnhardt made a pit stop on the following lap. After the pit stops, Kahne retook the lead. Johnson steered left at turn three and passed Kahne for the lead on lap 211 and started to pull away from the rest of the field. Bowyer drove to his garage on lap 216 for a transmission change because he had lost the use of third gear. Jeff Gordon had closed the gap to Kahne by lap 229. Green-flag pit stops again started six laps later when Kahne made a pit stop from second place. Johnson took on four tires at his stop on lap 239, handing the lead to Jeff Gordon, who ceded it to Earnhardt two laps later. Martin's pit crew dropped a lug nut which resulted in him remaining stationary for 21.7 seconds. Burton stalled his car which required his crew to push him to the end of pit road. An eighth caution was triggered on lap 242 when Yeley attempted to drive down pit road, and Martin was approaching him. Martin tried to avoid Yeley by steering left onto the turn four apron but made contact with him. Martin then spun and went hard into the tri-oval wall; his car went airborne. Robby Gordon could not avoid the melee and hit Yeley. Gordon consequently spun into the front stretch grass but continued.

Earnhardt made a pit stop on lap 244, followed by Kahne on the following lap. Edwards gained the lead and maintained it at the lap-252 restart, followed by Earnhardt and Kahne. Five laps later, Kahne passed Edwards to reclaim the lead as they came across slower cars and began to pull away. Debris was located on the track on lap 276, necessitating the race's ninth caution. The leaders elected to make pit stops during the caution. Kahne maintained his lead at the lap-281 restart and pulled away from Earnhardt. Jeff Gordon passed Nemechek to move into fourth place on the following lap. Jeff Gordon's engine failed after he crossed the start-finish line on lap 302, triggering the race's final caution. The leaders, including Kahne, made pit stops for fuel under caution. Johnson led the field at the lap-307 restart, ahead of Kahne, Earnhardt and Burton. Kahne turned right to the track's outside and passed Johnson around the inside in turn one for the lead on the 309th lap. Burton (who felt a vibration from his car) passed Earnhardt to take over third position seven laps later. Kahne increased his advantage over Johnson in the remaining seventeen laps to win the race and became the eighth driver to win both points races at Lowe's Motor Speedway in a calendar year. Johnson finished second, ahead of Burton in third, Earnhardt was fourth and Bobby Labonte fifth. Kyle Busch, Raines, Edwards, Nemechek, and Vickers rounded out the top ten. The race had a total of ten cautions and thirty-four lead changes by thirteen different drivers. Kahne led eight times for a total of 134 laps, more than any other competitor. The win was the seventh of Kahne's Cup Series career and the last of a series-high six victories he posted in 2006.

== Post-race ==
Kahne appeared in victory lane in front of the crowd of 170,000 to celebrate his sixth win of the season, which earned him $305,889. Kahne was delighted with his victory and thanked the people who worked on his car's transmission and rear: "We had a great car. It was unbelievable all night. I slammed it into second gear at the end of pit road one time and I thought I had to break something. This isn't the special car. This car's been good two other times this year, but it went to waste. It's just an awesome team." Second-place finisher Johnson said he finished the event where he ran in its duration: "I only made up ten points. But ten points is ten points." Third-place finisher Burton was happy to recover from a tire issue from the previous race at Talladega Superspeedway. However, he was upset that he stalled his engine as he felt it cost him the chance of victory. Burton also said his late-race vibration was enough to scare him and was glad the race ended because of the amount of shudder coming from his car: "I screamed, 'We've got a wheel loose, we got a wheel loose' and they said, we do not have a wheel loose, we know we got them tight."

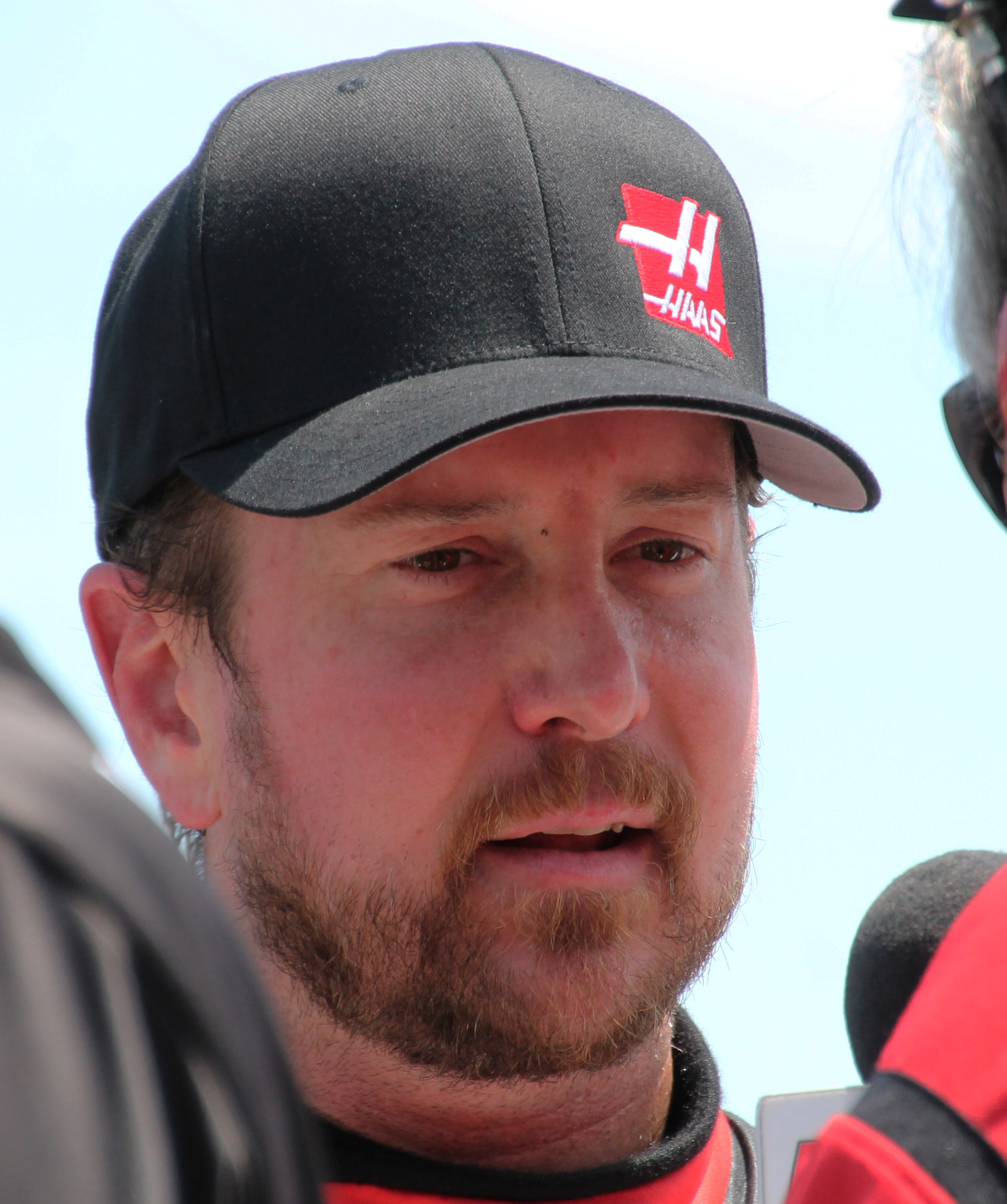
Kurt Busch (pictured in 2015) was penalized 50 points because his team was found to have violated three NASCAR rules.

Shortly after leaving his car, Martin said he believed it was not possible for him to clinch the championship: "They tell me a lot of people are having trouble anyway, but we didn't need to throw that away." He said he was unaware that Yeley intended to make a pit stop and, from his viewpoint, it allowed Kenseth to pass him while Yeley was coming from the center of the track. Yeley said the pit stop was planned and signaled his intentions to Martin for over a mile. He felt Martin placed him in a position to hit the backstretch wall. Hamlin said the first-lap crash that he was involved in was part of auto racing and stated it was problematic being involved in difficulties in the Chase for the Nextel Cup: "We checked up and somebody else (Waltrip) didn't. I put myself back there in qualifying. We'll take our lumps and go on." Seventh-place finisher Raines was happy to hold the first position for 28 laps saying it was "extra special" to lead a race at Charlotte. Tom Bowles of Frontstretch opined that, had the caution flag not been displayed for the three safety vehicles on lap nine, it could have resulted in "one of the most disastrous accidents in NASCAR history."

Johnson and Burton stated it was difficult to achieve a rhythm because of the small fuel cells mandated for the race and the hard-compound tires. Temperatures had been warmer than the previous day's Busch Series race and this gave the drivers more grip although sliding was observed during both events. McMurray noted it was difficult to drive alongside other cars and that other competitors drove cautiously. Kenny Francis, Kahne's crew chief, said he preferred to see longer runs but was aware that safety had to be taken into consideration. Four days after the race, Penske Racing South was given penalties for Kurt Busch's car. The penalties, for "actions detrimental to stock car racing"; "car, car parts, components and/or equipment that do not conform to NASCAR rules"; and a right rear shock absorber that did not compress, included a $25,000 fine and a two-race suspension for crew chief Roy McCauley who was placed on probation until December 31, 2006. Crew chief Matt Gimbel took over McCauley's role at the next race weekend. Team owner Roger Penske and Kurt Busch were penalized 50 points in the Owners' and Drivers' Championships. The following day, Penske Racing South announced it would not appeal the penalties.

The result kept Burton in the lead of the Drivers' Championship with 5,763 points, ahead of Kenseth, who had 5,718. Harvick moved into third with 5,674, thirteen points ahead of Martin who fell to fourth. Earnhardt moved in front of Hamlin for fifth, and Johnson, Kahne and Kyle Busch filled positions seven to nine. After the race, Jeff Gordon (who fell to tenth) said he would try to win races to return to contention for the championship. In the Manufacturers' Championship, Chevrolet maintained the lead with 237 points. Dodge remained in second with 179, six points ahead of Ford. The race took three hours, forty-seven minutes and twenty-nine seconds to complete, and the margin of victory was 1.624 seconds.

=== Race results ===
Pos	Car	Driver	Team	Manufacturer	Laps run	Points
1	9	Kasey Kahne	Evernham Motorsports	Dodge	334	190^{2}
2	48	Jimmie Johnson	Hendrick Motorsports	Chevrolet	334	175^{1}
3	31	Jeff Burton	Richard Childress Racing	Chevrolet	334	165
4	8	Dale Earnhardt Jr.	Dale Earnhardt, Inc.	Chevrolet	334	165^{1}
5	43	Bobby Labonte	Petty Enterprises	Dodge	334	160^{1}
6	5	Kyle Busch	Hendrick Motorsports	Chevrolet	334	155^{1}
7	96	Tony Raines	Hall of Fame Racing	Chevrolet	334	151^{1}
8	99	Carl Edwards	Roush Racing	Ford	334	147^{1}
9	01	Joe Nemechek	Ginn Racing	Chevrolet	334	138
10	25	Brian Vickers	Hendrick Motorsports	Chevrolet	334	134
11	14	Sterling Marlin	MB2 Motorsport	Chevrolet	334	135^{1}
12	42	Casey Mears	Chip Ganassi Racing	Dodge	333	127
13	20	Tony Stewart	Joe Gibbs Racing	Chevrolet	333	124
14	17	Matt Kenseth	Roush Racing	Ford	332	126^{1}
15	40	David Stremme	Chip Ganassi Racing	Dodge	332	118
16	66	Jeff Green	Haas CNC Racing	Chevrolet	332	115
17	10	Scott Riggs	Evernham Motorsports	Dodge	332	117^{1}
18	29	Kevin Harvick	Richard Childress Racing	Chevrolet	332	109
19	4	Todd Bodine	Morgan-McClure Motorsports	Chevrolet	331	106
20	32	Travis Kvapil	PPI Motorsports	Chevrolet	331	103
21	44	Terry Labonte	Hendrick Motorsports	Chevrolet	331	100
22	45	Kyle Petty	Petty Enterprises	Dodge	330	97
23	07	Clint Bowyer	Richard Childress Racing	Chevrolet	329	99^{1}
24	24	Jeff Gordon	Hendrick Motorsports	Chevrolet	301	96^{1}
25	7	Robby Gordon	Robby Gordon Motorsports	Chevrolet	300	88
26	22	Dave Blaney	Bill Davis Racing	Dodge	278	85
27	12	Ryan Newman	Penske Racing South	Dodge	272	82
28	11	Denny Hamlin	Joe Gibbs Racing	Chevrolet	265	79
29	18	J. J. Yeley	Joe Gibbs Racing	Chevrolet	258	76
30	6	Mark Martin	Roush Racing	Ford	239	73
31	1	Martin Truex Jr.	Dale Earnhardt, Inc.	Chevrolet	216	70
32	2	Kurt Busch	Penske Racing South	Dodge	208	17^{3}
33	38	David Gilliland	Robert Yates Racing	Ford	161	64
34	26	Jamie McMurray	Roush Racing	Ford	160	61
35	19	Elliott Sadler	Evernham Motorsports	Dodge	124	63^{1}
36	41	Reed Sorenson	Chip Ganassi Racing	Dodge	115	55
37	16	Greg Biffle	Roush Racing	Ford	111	52
38	55	Michael Waltrip	Waltrip-Jasper Racing	Dodge	102	49
39	06	Todd Kluever	Roush Racing	Ford	45	46
40	21	Ken Schrader	Wood Brothers Racing	Ford	45	43
41	88	Dale Jarrett	Robert Yates Racing	Ford	32	40
42	49	Mike Bliss	BAM Racing	Dodge	1	37
43	72	Mike Skinner	CJM Racing	Chevrolet	1	34
^{1} Includes five bonus points for leading a lap^{2} Includes ten bonus points for leading the most laps^{3} Includes a 50-point post-race penalty

== Standings after the race ==
Drivers' Championship standings
Pos	+/–	Driver	Points
1		Jeff Burton	5,763
2		Matt Kenseth	5,718 (−45)
3	1	Kevin Harvick	5,674 (−89)
4	1	Mark Martin	5,661 (−102)
5	1	Dale Earnhardt Jr.	5,657 (−106)
6	1	Denny Hamlin	5,626 (−137)
7	1	Jimmie Johnson	5,617 (−146)
8	1	Kasey Kahne	5,603 (−160)
9	1	Kyle Busch	5,568 (−195)
10	3	Jeff Gordon	5,547 (−216)

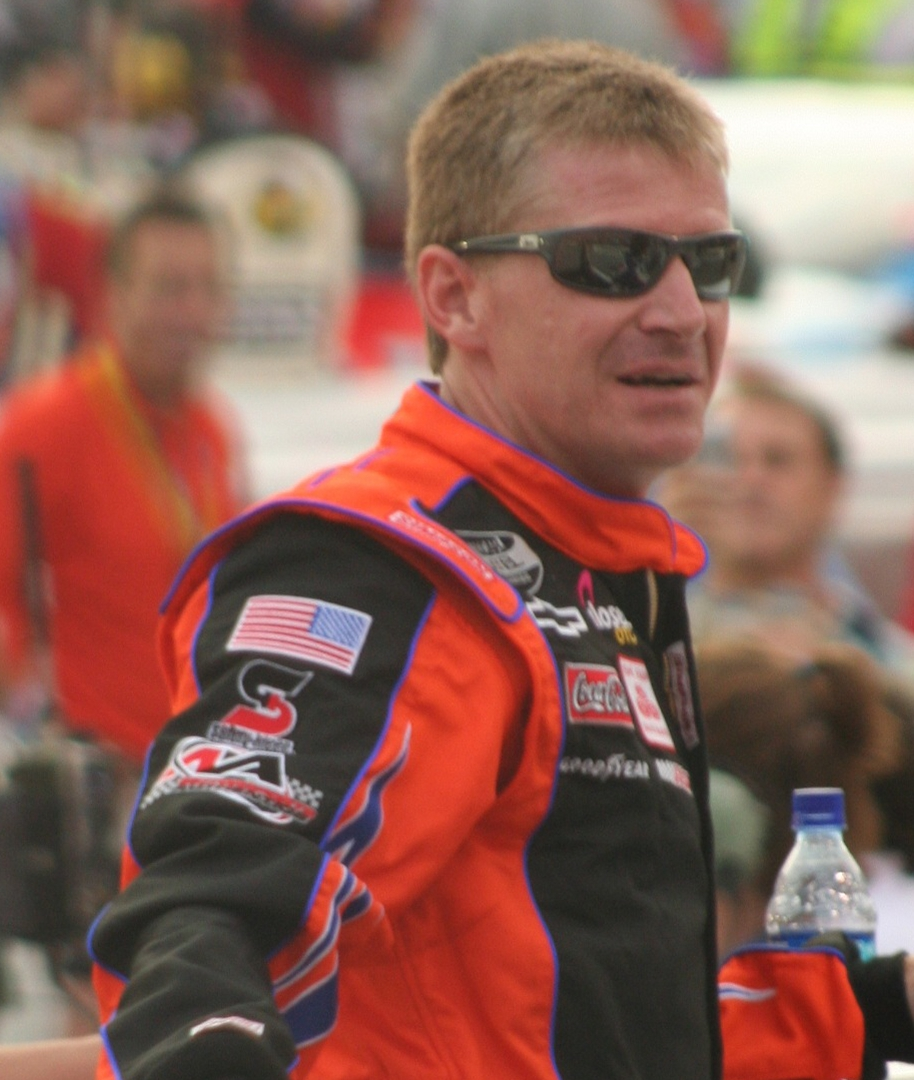
Jeff Burton (pictured in 2007) remained the points leader after the race.

Manufacturers' Championship standings
Pos	+/–	Manufacturer	Points
1		Chevrolet	237
2		Dodge	179 (−58)
3		Ford	173 (−64)

- Note: Only the top ten positions are included for the driver standings. These drivers qualified for the Chase for the Nextel Cup.

Previous race: 2006 UAW-Ford 500	Nextel Cup Series; 2006 season	Next race: 2006 Subway 500
