= Derrick Taylor =

American football player (born 1964)

No. 22
- Position: Defensive back

Personal information
- Born: March 15, 1964 (age 62); St. Louis, Missouri, U.S.
- Listed height: 5 ft 11 in (1.80 m)
- Listed weight: 186 lb (84 kg)

Career information
- High school: Charlotte Catholic (Charlotte, North Carolina)
- College: NC State (1983–1986)
- NFL draft: 1987: undrafted

Career history
- New Orleans Saints (1987); Calgary Stampeders (1988–1989)

Career NFL statistics
- Games played: 3
- Games started: 3
- Stats at Pro Football Reference

Derrick Howard Taylor (born March 15, 1964) is an American former professional football player who was a defensive back in the National Football League (NFL) and Canadian Football League (CFL). He played college football for the NC State Wolfpack. He played in the NFL for the New Orleans Saints in 1987.

== Early life ==
Taylor attended Charlotte Catholic High School in Charlotte, North Carolina.

== College career ==
While at North Carolina State University his senior year, he recorded six interceptions, with one returned for a touchdown.

== Professional career ==
During the 1987 strike shortened NFL season, Taylor made three game appearances and three starts for the New Orleans Saints.
