= Charlotte Catholic High School =

American private school in North Carolina

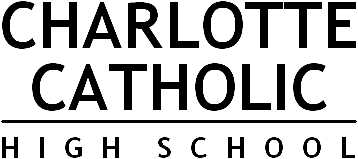

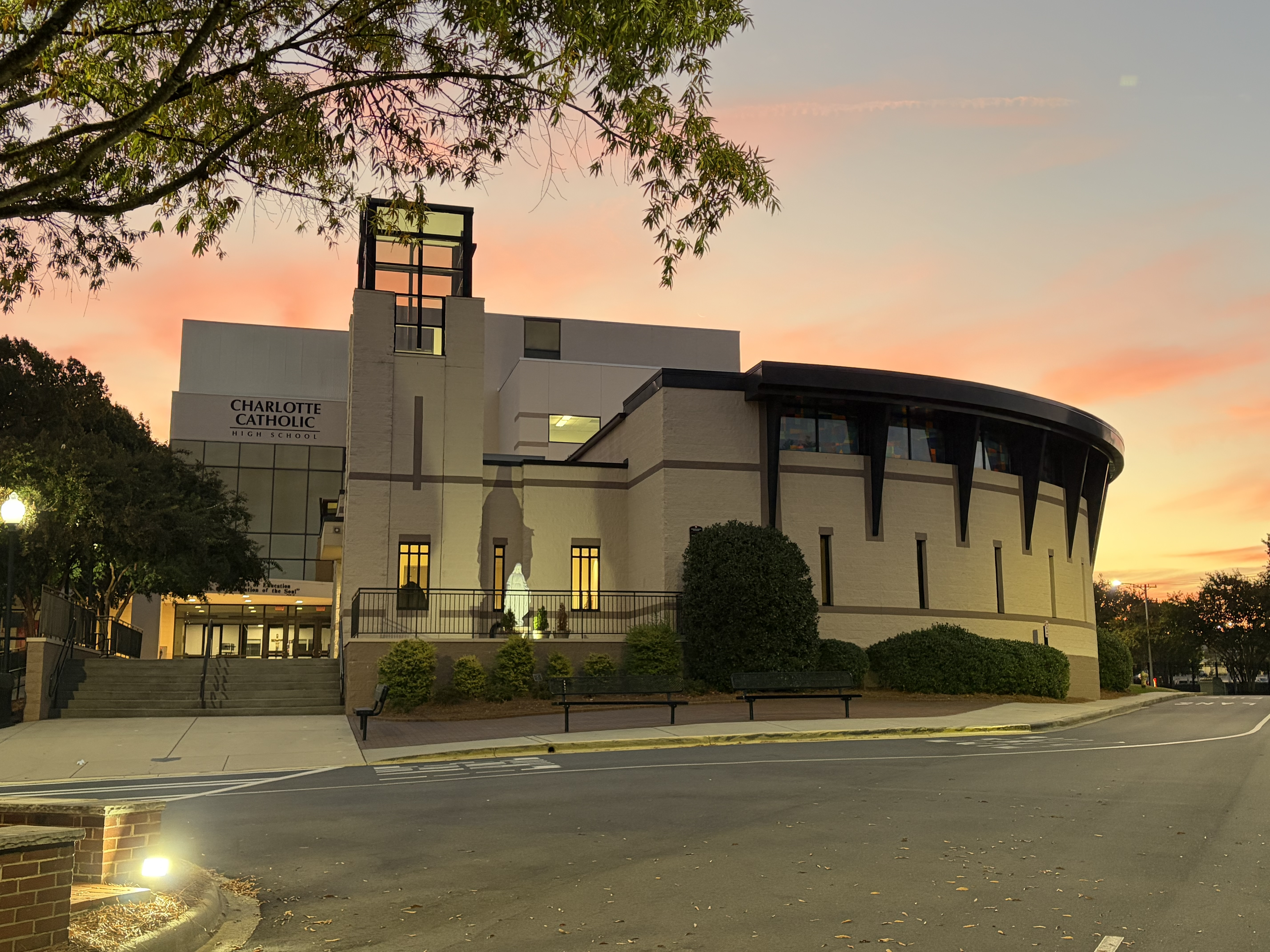
- Charlotte Catholic High School, October 2025

Location
- 7702 Pineville Matthews Road; Charlotte, North Carolina 28226; United States; 35°5′18″N 80°51′0″W

Information
- Other name: Charlotte Catholic, CCHS
- Type: Private; Independent; college-preparatory; Catholic school
- Motto: Lux et Veritas (Light and Truth)
- Religious affiliation: Catholic
- Established: 1955 (71 years ago)
- School board: Mecklenburg Area Catholic Schools
- Superintendent: Dr. Gregory Monroe
- CEEB code: 340665
- President: Michael Seeley
- Dean: Sarah Danser, Gary Hoilett
- Principal: Kurt Telford
- Chaplain: Fr. Chukwononso Nnebe-Agumadu
- Grades: 9–12
- Gender: Co-educational
- Age range: 14–18
- Education system: MACS(Mecklenburg Area Catholic Schools)
- Hours in school day: 7 hours
- Campus type: Urban
- Colors: Light blue, white, and red
- Slogan: "The soul of education is the education of the soul" (Pope Pius XI)
- Athletics: NCHSAA 6A
- Athletics conference: Southern Carolina 6A/7A
- Mascot: Cougar
- Nickname: Cougars
- Team name: Charlotte Catholic Cougars
- Accreditation: Lumen Accreditation
- Newspaper: The Chronicle
- Yearbook: Signet II
- Tuition: Tuition for Non-Participating Catholics & Non-Catholics ($13,348); Discounted Tuition for Participating Catholics ($9,366)
- Website: www.charlottecatholic.org

Charlotte Catholic High School is a four-year private, Catholic college preparatory high school in Charlotte, North Carolina, United States. CCHS was founded in 1955. The school is accredited by the Southern Association of Colleges and Schools. It is located in the Roman Catholic Diocese of Charlotte. Charlotte Catholic has a student to teacher ratio of 15:4.

== Athletics ==
Charlotte Catholic is a member of the North Carolina High School Athletic Association (NCHSAA), one of only four non-public or charter school members, and are classified as a 6A school. The school is a part of the Southern Carolina 6A/7A Conference alongside schools from Union County. Charlotte Catholic's mascot is the cougar, with the school colors being red, white and sky blue and occasionally black for special sports games. CCHS fields teams in 25 different sports, including all NCHSAA-sanctioned events plus several club sports such as rugby, ice hockey, and mountain biking. The school has won ten Wachovia/Wells Fargo Cups, awarded each school year to the top overall athletic program in each class in North Carolina, with the most recent award coming in 2026.

=== Swimming ===
The women's swim team won fourteen consecutive NCHSAA state championships from 2002 to 2015. In 2006 during Catholic's first season in the 3A division, the men's and women's swim teams both won state championships. Both teams would win consecutive state swim championships from 2006 to 2008.

=== Lacrosse ===
On May 15, 2010, the Charlotte Catholic Women's Lacrosse team became the first North Carolina women's lacrosse state champions in NCHSAA history. The men's lacrosse team won its first NCHSAA state championship in 2014. In 2026, the men's and women's lacrosse programs swept the NCHSAA championships at the new 1A-6A level.

=== Soccer ===
The men's and women's Cougar soccer programs have experienced great success over the years, with the men's team winning eight state championships and the women's team claiming four of their own. Both genders won a state championship in 2026, with the men winning on penalties in the fall and the women completing an unbeaten season in the spring.

=== Rugby ===
Charlotte Catholic's Rugby team in 2010 had a perfect regular season and won all three of its matches at USA Rugby South High School Championships, advancing to the National championships. In 2011, Charlotte Catholic again competed in the National Championships finishing in 4th place. In 2026, they won the North Carolina Single-School League Boys High School Rugby State Championship along with a perfect season.

=== Basketball ===
During the 2015–2016 school year, Charlotte Catholic won the NCHSAA 4A men's basketball state championship.

=== Football ===
Catholic has long been one of the top football teams in greater Charlotte, first rising to prominence in the 1970s under longtime head coach Jim Oddo and his Wing-T option offense. The "Big Red Machine" won their first NCHSAA football state championship in 1977, taking the 2A title. In 2005, the Cougars won the NCHSAA 3AA state championship, after winning the 2AA state championship in 2004. Catholic went 32–0 over the span of the 2004 and 2005 seasons. Oddo won more than 200 games in his time as head coach and the playing field at Catholic's Keffer Stadium has been named in his honor.

After Coach Oddo's retirement in 2014, new head coach Mike Brodowicz led Catholic to unprecedented success in football. Coach Brodowicz modernized the Cougars' option to the flexbone and took Catholic to the NCHSAA 4A state championship game in his first season, falling to New Bern High School in the title game. In 2015, Brodowicz led Catholic to their first state championship victory at the 4A level, defeating Junius H. Rose High School. In 2016, Catholic lost to James B. Dudley High School in the NCHSAA 4A semi-finals. In 2017, Catholic was moved to the NCHSAA 3A classification for all sports and the 3A level for football. Charlotte Catholic football would win four straight 3A state championships from 2017–2020.

MaxPreps recognized Charlotte Catholic as the best football program in North Carolina during the 2010s.

=== Catholic–Country Day Rivalry ===
Charlotte Catholic and Charlotte Country Day School (CCDS) have long been rivals across multiple sports; their campuses are separated by only several miles in south Charlotte and both schools regularly schedule each other despite Country Day not playing for NCHSAA championships. The annual Cook-Oddo Cup football game between the Buccaneers and Cougars (named after both schools' former coaches) is traditionally held early in the season as a non-conference game. The game alternates each year between the Bucs' Belk Stadium and Catholic's Keffer Stadium.

== Fine arts ==
In 2022, the school underwent a $21 million dollar renovation for a fine arts center.

== Controversy ==
=== Principal Healy ===
In 2014, Jerry Healy, Charlotte Catholic's principal, resigned amidst speculation that he had been embezzling money from a fund set up to aid lower-income families in sending their children to the school. In 2015 Healy pleaded guilty to stealing more than $160,000 from the school as well as the foundation over a seven-year period. While prosecutors suggested probation with no action to take him into custody, in April 2016 U.S. District Judge Frank Whitney Jr. sentenced Healy to three months in a halfway house. Until this point, Healy was a well-known and well-liked member of the Catholic school system community, having served as principal at Charlotte Catholic for over a decade and working closely with the diocese for 44 years.

=== Lonnie Billard Lawsuit ===
On January 11, 2017, Lonnie Billard took action to sue Charlotte Catholic High School on an account of discrimination. Billard claims he lost his teaching job at Catholic due to him announcing wedding plans for a long time male partner. The Federal Lawsuit accuses CCHS, Meckenburg Area Catholic Schools, and the Roman Catholic Diocese of Charlotte of illegal discrimination of him due to his sexual preference. Billard was previously a teacher of the year recipient in 2012, when fully employed by Catholic, until his resign the same year. On October 25, 2014, of which just weeks before North Carolina's same-sex marriage law was eliminated, Billard posted his wedding announcement on Facebook. The lawsuit states that on Christmas Day he was fired as a sub at CCHS. On January 9, 2015, Billard informed Charlotte Media of his termination from Catholic. Multiple legal directors agreed that even though it's a religiously affiliated school, it does not have any right to refuse the Title VII of the Civil Rights Act of 1964. The complaint, filled by the state's office of the American Civil Liberties Union, declares back pay, benefits, punitive damage, compensatory damages for emotional distress, a court order blocking the school and Catholic leaders from taking similar actions in the future, and his substitute teacher job back. In 2021, a federal judge granted Summary Judgment in Billard's favor, the diocese implied it would appeal to the Fourth Circuit.

=== Sister Jane Dominic Speech ===
On March 21, 2014, Charlotte Catholic welcomed Sister Jane Dominic Laurel, a Dominican Nun trained at the Pontifical University, to give a speech on Catholic beliefs on gender roles. During the speech, Sister Jane Dominic suggested that masturbation and pornography can lead young adults to become homosexuals and that children raised in single parent homes have a greater likelihood to grow up to be gay. Students and parents were not told ahead of time of the content of her speech. An online petition written by Charlotte Catholic alumni Emma Winters(c/o 2014) against the content of her speech garnered 2000 signatures and a letter-writing campaign to the Dioceses of Charlotte and the U.S. Conference of Catholic Bishops was initiated. Shortly thereafter, a counter petition was written by then Charlotte Catholic student Jack Denton, who would later be involved in a controversial religious liberty suit at Florida State University, (c/o 2017) which defended the dignity of Sister Jane Dominic Laurel since it had come under attack after her lecture. It garnered over 2500 signatures. A parents meeting held by the high school later in the week to discuss the speech attracted nearly a thousand people and the meeting went over an hour longer than scheduled due to the number of parents who wished to ask questions or make comments. The speech and fallout received national media attention. The Dioceses of Charlotte and Bishop Peter Jugis continued to support the teachings of Sister Jane Dominic and she was vigorously supported by Catholic media. In early April, Sister Jane Dominic cancelled all of her scheduled speaking events and took a sabbatical from her teaching position at Aquinas College. The President of Aquinas College stated that in her speech Sister Jane Dominic “spoke clearly on matters of faith and morals” but “her deviation into realms of sociology and anthropology was beyond the scope of her expertise.”

=== Vaping ===
On November 17, 2017, Charlotte Catholic announced that disciplinary measures would include the prohibition of vaping devices and letters were sent home on this issue. The use of such devices has led to the expulsion of a "handful" of students.

=== Staff Member ===
In March 2018, Charlotte Catholic fired a school staff member after two students aged between 16 and 17 came forward with inappropriate text conversations.

=== Firing of Sister Agnes ===
On May 17, 2020, the contract of Sister Agnes, a member of the Theology department at Charlotte Catholic, was not renewed. A student-created petition garnered thousands of signatures demanding the reversal of this decision.

=== Bullying ===
In October, 2024, parents of several Charlotte Catholic students reported a culture of bullying at the school to One in Five Foundations for Kids. The accusations stated that players of Charlotte Catholic's football team bullied other students and were involved in hazing at the school. Charlotte Catholic administration took action of suspensions and expulsions by those who facilitated the bullying.

=== Lumen Accreditation ===
In the spring of 2024, Mecklenburg Area Catholic Schools, the system Charlotte Catholic falls under, began to look for new accreditation system after their contract with Cognia was set to expire. In July 2024, the school signed with Lumen, an accreditation system created by The Catholic University of America as part of an initiative to tighten Catholic teachings into everyday school life. Charlotte Catholic officials did not communicate the change to parents until January 2025. The change quickly garnered backlash from parents and students alike with a change.org petition being started to have administration give more detailed answers which has gained almost 2,000 signatures. School staff did not publicly comment on the matter.

On January 28, 2025, a second petition was created calling for the resignation of Principal Lori Philips, President Kurt Telford and Superintendent of Mecklenburg Area Catholic Schools, Gregory Monroe. On February 6, 2025, a video surfaced of Principal Philips at a meeting with parents meant to answer questions about the recent changes. In the video, one parent can be heard saying there was a culture problem at the school. Philips made comment that the parents were the culture problem, resulting in very negative reactions from parents in attendance. On February 12, Principal Philips announced her resignation from Charlotte Catholic after public backlash.

== Notable alumni ==
- Laura DuPont, tennis player and first female national champion in any sport at the University of North Carolina at Chapel Hill
- Robert L. FitzPatrick, author and writer covering pyramid schemes and multi-level marketing companies
- Patrick Hogan, USL Championship soccer player
- Elijah Hood, former NFL running back
- Kevin Martin, served as 25th Chairman of the U.S. Federal Communications Commission (FCC)
- Brendan McDonough, former MLS player
- Mick Mulvaney, former acting White House Chief of Staff and 41st Director of the Office of Management and Budget (OMB)
- Donnie Smith, former MLS player
- Derrick Taylor, former NFL defensive back
- H.A. Wheeler, served as president and general manager of Charlotte Motor Speedway

== See also ==
- List of high schools in North Carolina
- National Catholic Educational Association
