= Robert L. FitzPatrick =

American writer (born 1946 or 1947)

- Born: Robert Lawrence FitzPatrick; 1946 or 1947 (age 78 or 79); Charlotte, North Carolina, U.S.
- Education: Belmont Abbey College (BA)
- Notable work: False Profits: Seeking Financial and Spiritual Deliverance in Multi-Level Marketing and Pyramid Schemes; Ponzinomics: The Untold Story of Multi-Level Marketing
- Website: www.pyramidschemealert.org

Robert Lawrence FitzPatrick (born 1946 or 1947) is an American author and writer. He serves as president of Pyramid Scheme Alert, a consumer organization to confront the abuses of pyramid schemes.

== Early life and education ==
FitzPatrick was born and raised in Charlotte, North Carolina to Thomas Raymond Fitzpatrick Sr. and Kathleen Ann Frank. FitzPatrick is the youngest of his two siblings. FitzPatrick graduated from Charlotte Catholic High School in 1964. FitzPatrick then attended Belmont Abbey College, and graduated with a Bachelor's degree in Sociology in 1968.

== Career ==
FitzPatrick's interest in pyramid schemes was sparked in the 1980s when he joined a business with a multi-level, direct-sales model. While Fitzpatrick didn't lose money, he did witness first-hand how one could get sucked into what he called "delusional behavior".

=== Author ===
FitzPatrick is the co-author of the self-published book False Profits: Seeking Financial and Spiritual Deliverance in Multi-Level Marketing and Pyramid Schemes (ISBN 0-964879-514), a 1997 critical book that examines the multi-level marketing (MLM) industry. He has followed it up with his book Ponzinomics: The Untold Story of Multi-Level Marketing (ISBN 978-0-57-844351-5) in 2021. The title: Ponzinomics is a portmanteau of Ponzi and Economics that "captures two realities of multilevel marketing": that it's both a pyramid scheme and a cult with a "belief system and... ideology"

=== Speaker ===
FitzPatrick has been featured on Fraud Squad TV, ABC World News and WTTW's Chicago Matters. He has been interviewed live on CBC's Marketplace. He has been quoted in newspapers and journals, including The Wall Street Journal and The New York Times.

== Personal life ==
FitzPatrick is of Italian descent.
