= Belmont Abbey College =

Catholic college in Belmont, North Carolina, US

Coordinates: 35.2595756°N 81.0409625°W

- Former names: St. Mary's College (1876–1913)
- Motto: Ut in omnibus glorificetur Deus
- Motto in English: That in all things God may be glorified
- Type: Private liberal arts college
- Established: April 21, 1876; 150 years ago
- Religious affiliation: Catholic (Benedictine)
- Academic affiliations: ACCU; CIC; NAICU
- Chancellor: Abbot Placid Solari
- President: Jeffrey W. Talley
- Faculty: 75 full-time
- Students: 1,675 (fall 2024)
- Undergraduates: 1,580 (fall 2024)
- Postgraduates: 95 (fall 2024)
- Location: Belmont, North Carolina, United States
- Campus: Suburban
- Newspaper: The Crusader
- Colors: Red, black, and white
- Nickname: Crusaders
- Sporting affiliations: NCAA Division II – Carolinas
- Mascot: Mr. Crusader
- Website: belmontabbeycollege.edu
- Belmont Abbey Historic District
- U.S. National Register of Historic Places
- U.S. Historic district
- Location within North Carolina Location within the United States
- Location: 100 Belmont--Mt. Holly Rd. Belmont, North Carolina
- Area: 37.5 acres (15.2 ha)
- Built: 1876
- Architect: Michael McInerney
- Architectural style: Gothic Revival, American Benedictine
- NRHP reference No.: 93000584
- Added to NRHP: July 14, 1993

Belmont Abbey College is a private Catholic liberal arts college in Belmont, North Carolina, United States. It was founded in 1876 by the Benedictine monks of Belmont Abbey. The college is affiliated with the Catholic Church and the Order of Saint Benedict. Belmont Abbey is the only college in North Carolina affiliated with the Catholic Church.

== History ==
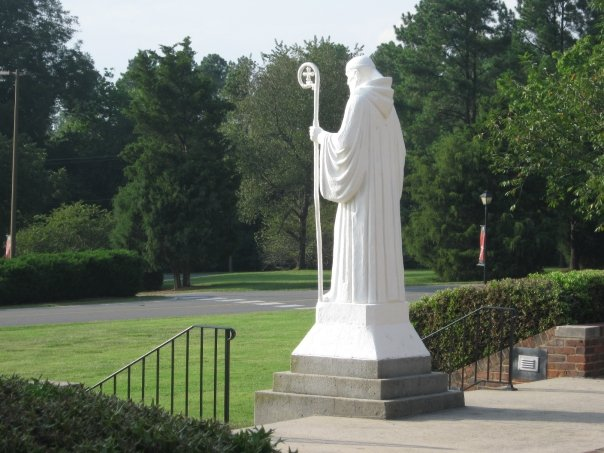
St. Benedict

Belmont Abbey College was founded in 1876 as St. Mary's College by Benedictine monks from Saint Vincent Archabbey in Pennsylvania. Father Jeremiah O'Connell purchased Caldwell farm and donated the land to the Benedictines, hoping the community would found a Catholic educational institution in the Carolinas. On April 21, 1876, Herman Wolfe, from Saint Vincent, arrived with two students to take possession of the property and begin classes. In 1878, the college held its first commencement exercises. Katharine Drexel, a benefactor of the monastery and college, visited Belmont Abbey in 1904. The present name of the college was adopted in 1913.

In 1967 John Oetgen, college president and Benedictine priest, conferred an honorary degree on the Protestant evangelist Billy Graham, marking what was at the time seen as a bold ecumenical gesture.

Originally a college for young men, Belmont Abbey became a coeducational institution in 1972. In 1987, Sacred Heart College for women merged with the abbey, and its campus began to host a variety of abbey classes and programs.

The Belmont Abbey Historic District was added to the National Register of Historic Places in 1993. It includes at its heart the separately listed Belmont Abbey Cathedral. Other contributing buildings include the Brothers' Building (1893, 1897, 1904), Old Science (1893), Jubilee Hall (1897), The Monastery (1880, 1891, and 1894), the College Building (or Stowe Hall, 1886, 1888, 1898), Saint Leo Hall (1907), and The Haid (1929).

=== Gratitude Bell ===
Dedicated in 2016, the Gratitude Bell at Belmont Abbey College sits near the campus cafeteria and invites students and visitors alike to ring it between noon and 3 p.m. in thanksgiving for their blessings. At noon, students gather to pray the Angelus and begin the three recognized hours of gratitude each day. Past president of the college, Bill Thierfelder, has said:

“Gratitude is an important virtue to me. I can actually hear the bell in my office. Every single time it rings, it brings a smile to my face because I know that somebody is thanking God. If I had one thing to share with everybody, I’d say, ‘Today, commit that in every circumstance, you’ll literally say it out loud, ‘Thank you, Jesus!’”

Originally forged in 1915 by the McShane Foundry of Baltimore, Maryland, the bell was later purchased and donated to Belmont Abbey by several patrons.

=== Faculty health care coverage controversy ===
In 2007 the college's administration removed healthcare coverage for "abortion, contraception, and voluntary sterilization" after discovering that these were covered by the college's healthcare policy. Eight faculty members responded by filing complaints to the North Carolina Department of Insurance, the Equal Employment Opportunity Commission, and the National Women's Law Center. The latter threatened a lawsuit on behalf of the eight faculty members, several of whom were allegedly lifelong Catholics.

On November 11, 2011, Belmont Abbey College sued the federal government over a new regulation that requires employer health insurance plans to provide free coverage of contraceptives and sterilization, even if it may be contrary to their religious beliefs."

== Campus ==
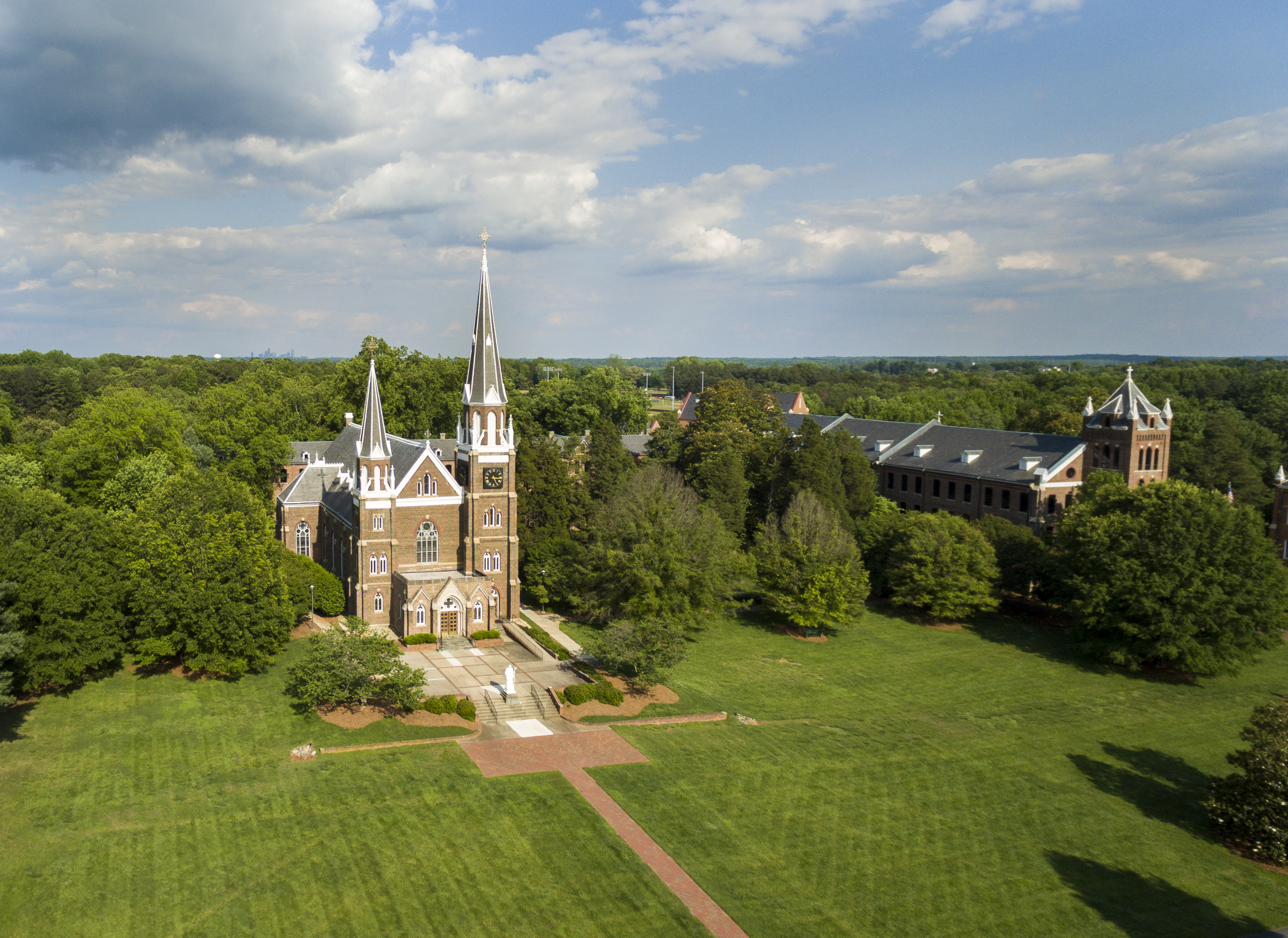
Aerial view of Belmont Abbey College

Maurus Hall is centrally located on campus and houses a student lounge, grill, and the Holy Grounds coffee shop. Across from Maurus Hall is the Haid, which serves as a student and community theater. The Haid was originally built as a gymnasium. The Abbey Players now perform there. Along Abbey Lane, towards the far end of the campus, are the Vincent Abbot Taylor Library and the William Gaston Science Hall. Administrative offices are located in Robert Stowe Hall, with classrooms on the second and third floors. St. Leo's Hall, built in the American Benedictine style, houses the Campus Book Store and Catholic Shop on the first floor. Professorial offices are located in St. Leo's Hall, and Grace Auditorium is located on the third floor.

The quad is located between the Poellath and O'Connell residence halls, both constructed in the early 1960s. Raphael Arthur Hall, constructed in 1967, offers students individual rooms and sits on the hill above Poellath, near Campus Police. The St. Joseph's Eucharistic Adoration Chapel, dedicated in 2008, is across from Campus Police. Wheeler Athletic Center, completed in 1970, is located behind Poellath Hall. At the back of the campus are the four Cuthbert Allen Apartment buildings, built in 1989. The newly renovated Student Commons, located next to the new cafeteria, houses the campus mailroom, snack machines, a lounge area, and Student Life offices. Behind the Student Commons are the St. Scholastica and St. Benedict residence halls. The Lourdes Grotto, an official pilgrimage shrine, is situated behind O'Connell Hall.

=== Mary Help of Christians Abbey Basilica ===
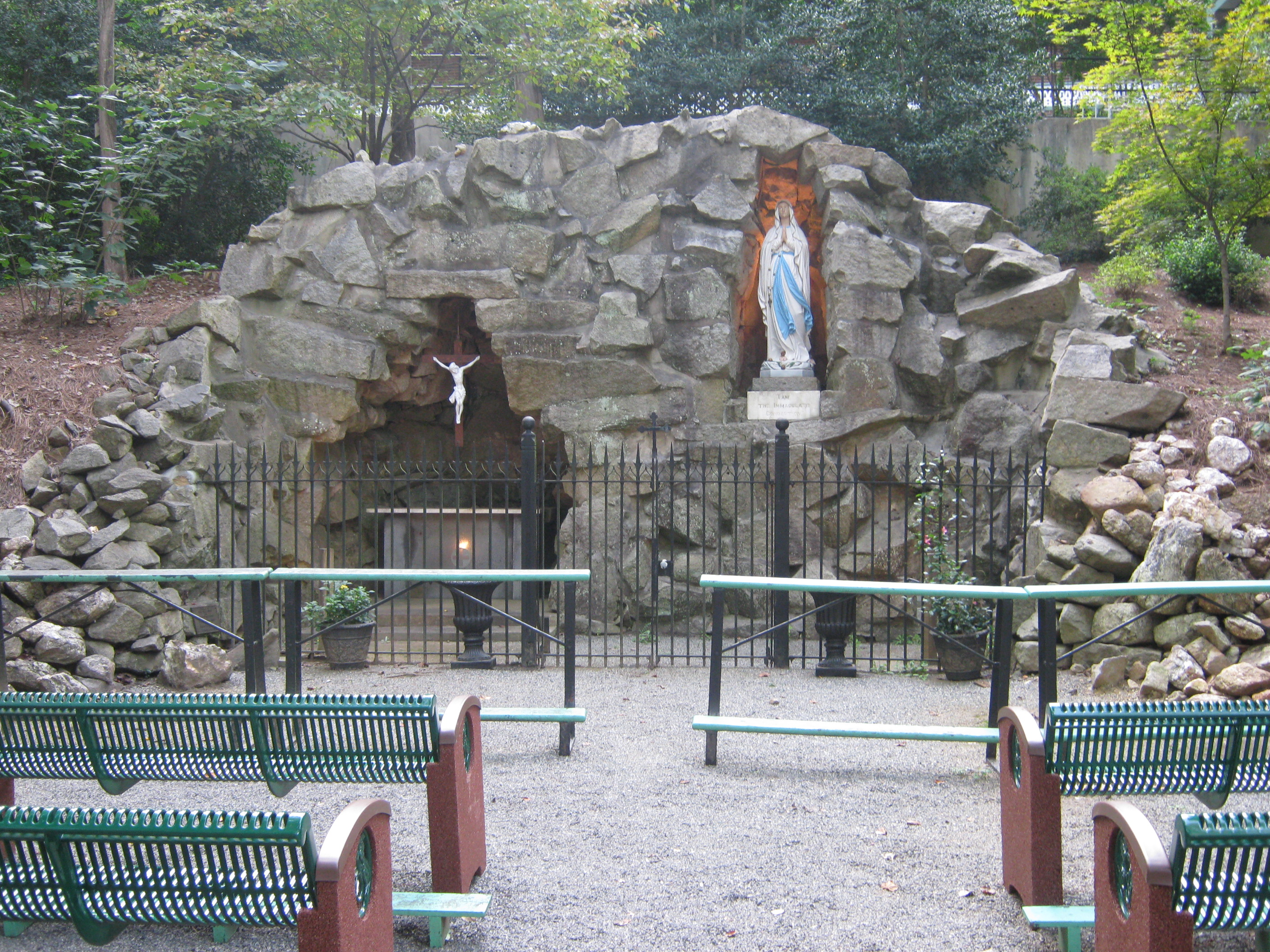
The Lourdes Grotto

The Abbey Church, the most prominent building on the college's campus, was completed in 1894 under the supervision of Abbot Leo Haid. Drexel made significant donations to the completion of the structure, which served as North Carolina's first and only cathedral prior to the erection of the Diocese of Raleigh in 1924. The church is constructed in the gothic-revival style out of brick and granite, built in the shape of a Latin cross. The towers of the church, named Ora (the taller) and Labora (the smaller), can be seen from most of the college campus. The taller of the two towers holds bells which ring to signal the celebration of the Eucharist and the Liturgy of the Hours. The monastic community holds daily services which are open to the public. Following the Second Vatican Council, the interior of the Abbey Church was renovated in a modernist style in order to facilitate the liturgical reforms of the era. In 1975, Belmont Abbey lost its territorial status and cathedral rank to the newly created Diocese of Charlotte. In 1998, Pope John Paul II named the Abbey Church a minor basilica in recognition of the historic and aesthetic significance of the structure.

=== Sacred Heart Extension ===
In 1892 the sisters began a finishing school for girls that eventually became a four-year degree institution, Sacred Heart College. Sacred Heart College closed in 1987, and a section of the College is now rented by Belmont Abbey and called Sacred Heart Extension; classes are offered at Sacred Heart for both traditional and adult degree students. Belmont Abbey continues to offer alumnae services to graduates from Sacred Heart College. The Sisters of Mercy reside at Sacred Heart Convent, in downtown Belmont. The convent is located on a campus made up of various organizations including Catherine's House, Holy Angels, and Mercy Heritage Center, and archives.

=== St. Joseph Adoration Chapel ===
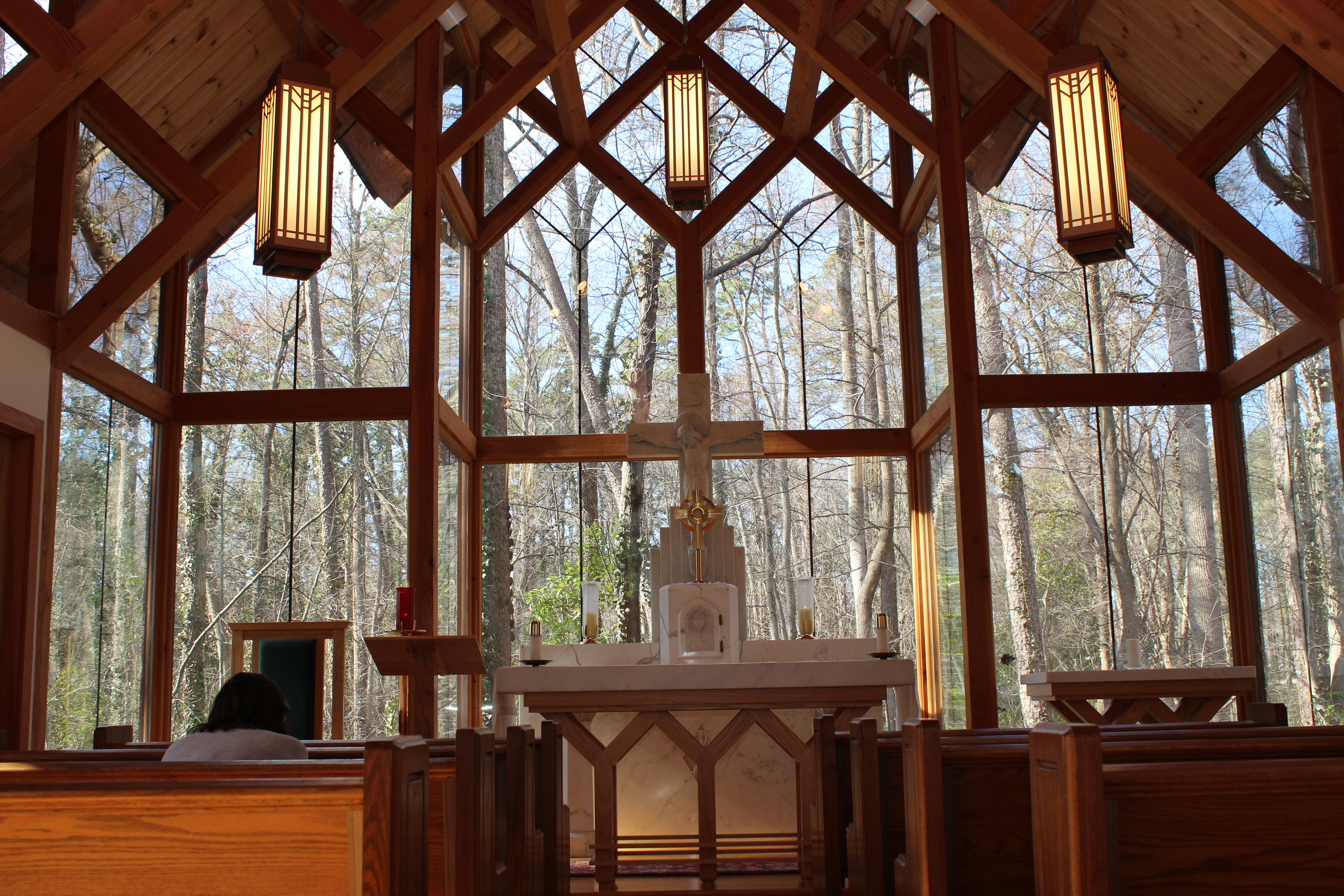
St. Joseph Adoration Chapel

The Saint Joseph Adoration Chapel was dedicated on November 7, 2008. During the fall and spring semesters, the chapel is open 24 hours a day for prayers and the Blessed Sacrament is exposed during the day.

== Academics ==
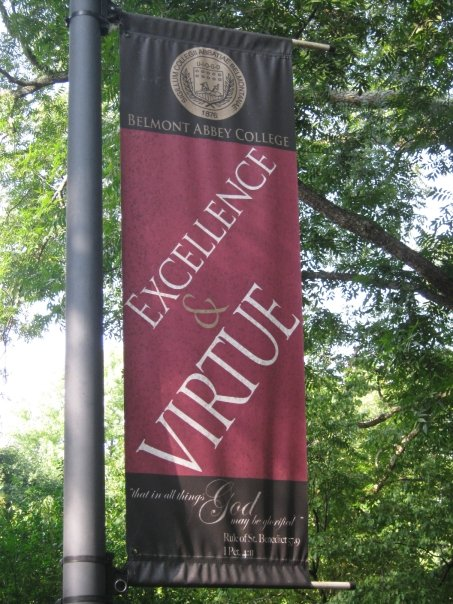
Reminder of the college's Aristotelian commitment

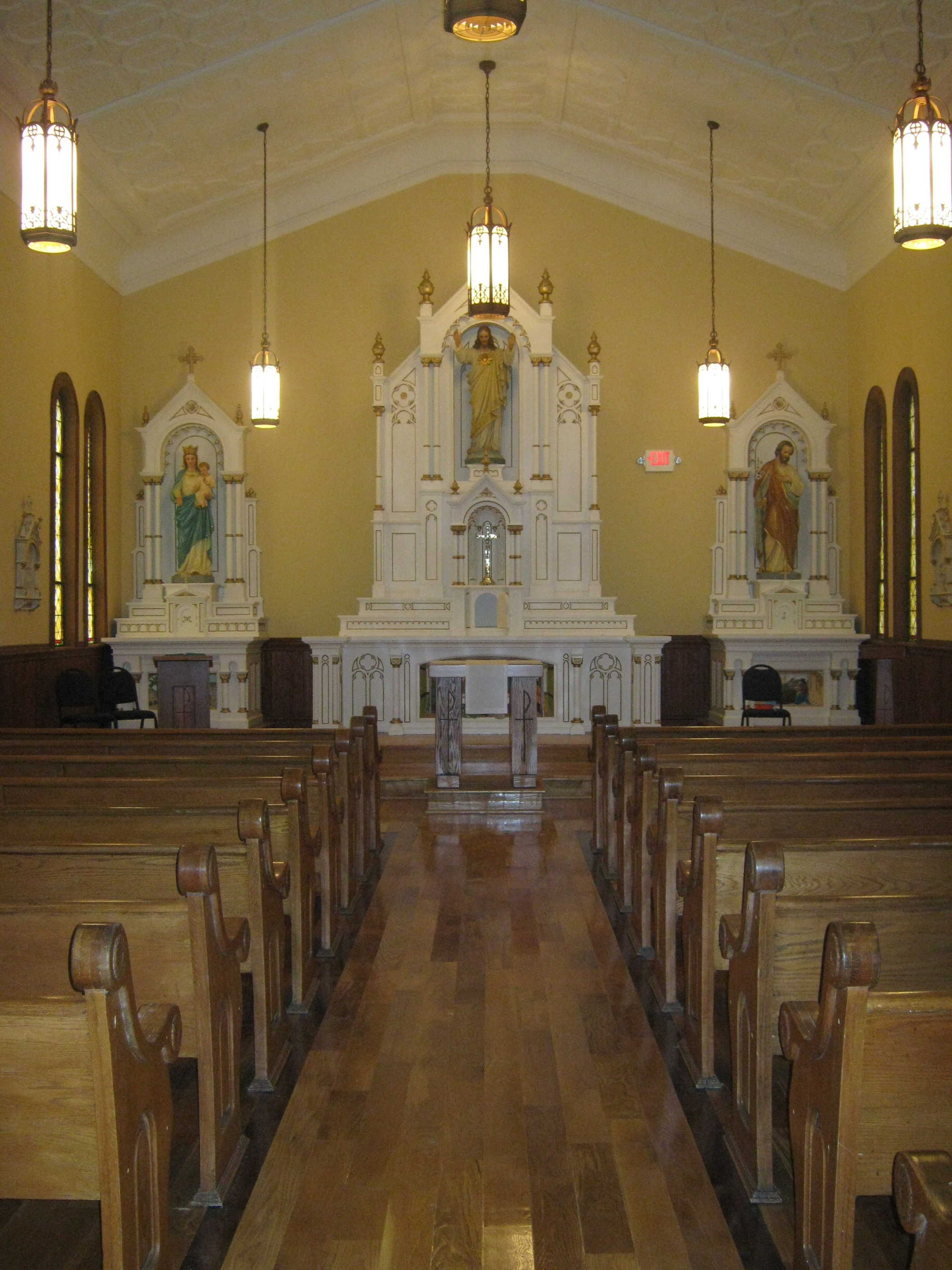
Chapel at Sacred Heart

The abbey is accredited by the Southern Association of Colleges and Schools and approved by the American Medical Association. More than 80 percent of the faculty at Belmont Abbey hold doctoral degrees in their subjects. After completing a core curriculum, students declare a major and concentrate within their chosen areas of study.

The college's First Year Symposium, required for incoming freshmen, seeks to acclimate new students to college life. Taught by professors from various fields, this course explains the theories of a liberal education and introduces students to the Rule of St. Benedict and the Catholic intellectual tradition.

It is endorsed by The Newman Guide to Choosing a Catholic College.

== Student life ==
=== Student organizations ===
The Abbey has over 80 student clubs and organizations and an active Student Government Association.

=== Abbey Players ===
The Abbey Players were founded in 1883. The theatre presents drama, comedy, and musicals. In addition, it functions as the Belmont Community Theatre, which brings in theatre artists from the surrounding Metrolina area.

=== Glee Club ===
In 1940, the Belmont Abbey and Sacred Heart Glee Clubs toured the Carolinas and Georgia, appearing in Columbia, Charleston, Augusta, Greensboro, Raleigh, and Wilmington.

=== Housing ===
Incoming freshmen are required to live in either Poellath or O'Connell, two-story single-sex residence halls. Beginning in fall 2013, upperclassmen were given the option to live in the newly built Saint Benedict Hall and Saint Scholastica Hall, single-sex residence halls for males and females respectively. Raphael Arthur Hall provides single rooms. In addition to the five residence halls on campus, upperclassmen are eligible to live in either one of the four on-campus Cuthbert Allen apartment buildings or the Cloisters, off-campus apartments in nearby Mount Holly.

== Athletics ==
Belmont Abbey Crusaders
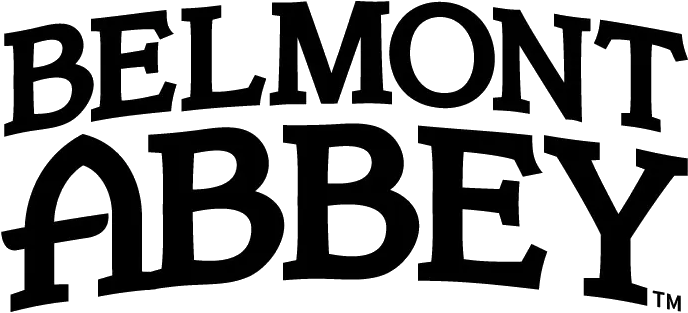
- University: Belmont Abbey College
- Nickname: Crusaders
- NCAA: Division II
- Conference: Conference Carolinas (primary)
- Athletic director: Paul Lyon (Interim)
- Location: Belmont, North Carolina
- Varsity teams: 28 (13 men's, 13 women's, 2 co-ed)
- Basketball arena: Wheeler Center
- Baseball stadium: Abbey Yard
- Softball stadium: Crusader Field
- Soccer field: Alumni Field
- Lacrosse stadium: Alumni Field
- Tennis venue: Reidy Tennis Center
- Colors: Crimson and white
- Website: abbeyathletics.com

The Belmont Abbey Crusaders participate in the NCAA's Division II program. The Crusaders are members of Conference Carolinas. Men's and women's lacrosse, women's golf, men's and women's tennis, and men's and women's track and field were added prior to the 2009 season.

Al McGuire coached Basketball for the Crusaders from 1957 to 1964. During his tenure the team had 5 post-season tournament appearances.

In 2009, the Crusaders Baseball team reached the NCAA Division II World Series, at the USA Baseball Training Complex located in Cary, North Carolina. The Crusaders were ranked 6th in their respective regional tournament and went on to win four straight against nationally ranked teams to capture their first regional championship. The Crusaders fell to eventual National Champions Lynn University after winning two in a row. The Crusaders finished the season ranked 3rd in the Nation.

In 2012, the women's volleyball, women's soccer, and men's basketball teams all won the NCAA Division II Conference Carolinas title. In 2018, the men's lacrosse team won the NCAA Division II Conference Carolinas title.

In 2021, the women's basketball, and men's basketball teams both won the NCAA Division II Conference Carolinas titles.

From 2022 to 2025 the men’s tennis team has won the Conference Carolinas tournament title four consecutive times in what is a historic achievement for the Crusaders clinching also their fourth straight NCAA Division II Tournament appearance.

As a member of Conference Carolinas, Belmont Abbey College competes annually for the league's Messick Award, which is presented to the team demonstrating the best overall sportsmanship throughout the entire conference schedule. As of 2019, Belmont Abbey Athletics has won the overall Messick Award five times: 2011–12, 2012–13, 2013–14 (tie), 2016–17, and 2018-19. In 2023, Belmont Abbey College won the Conference Carolinas Dr. Alan Patterson Body, Mind, and Soul Award, "the ultimate, comprehensive conference award recognizing the member with the best average ranking when combining the Hawn (Athletic Performance), Sharp (Graduation Rates), and Messick (Sportsmanship) awards." The Abbey was the first recipient of this new award.

== Notable alumni ==
- Jordan Anderson – NASCAR driver
- David Brumbaugh – Oklahoma House of Representatives
- Joseph Cryan – state senator and former New Jersey General Assembly majority leader
- Clay Dimick – soccer player
- Joseph Lennox Federal – Bishop of Salt Lake City from 1960 to 1980
- Robert L. FitzPatrick – author and writer covering pyramid schemes and multi-level marketing companies
- Hal Haid – baseball player
- Winder R. Harris – U.S. Representative from Virginia
- Nikki Hornsby – musician
- Franklin Lawson – soccer coach for Georgia Perimeter College
- Robert G. Marshall – Virginia House of Delegates
- Patrick McHenry – U.S. Representative from North Carolina, Speaker Pro-Tempore of the U.S House of Representatives
- Eugene O'Dunne – judge on the Supreme Bench of Baltimore
- Emilio Pagan – baseball player
- Alex Pledger – basketball player
- Michal Smolen – slalom canoeist
- Tony Suarez – soccer player
- Vincent Stanislaus Waters – Bishop of the Diocese of Raleigh
- Patti Wheeler – president and owner of Wheeler Television Inc.
