= William K. Thierfelder =

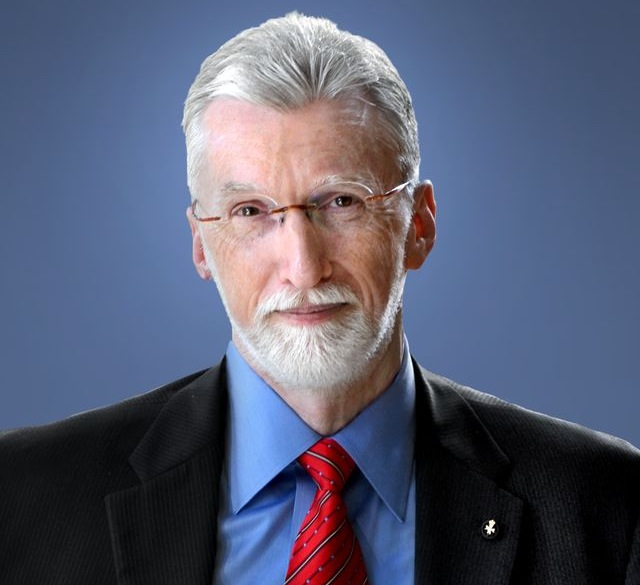

20th President of Belmont Abbey College
- In office June 9, 2004 – August 2, 2025
- Preceded by: Robert Preston; Abbot Placid Solari (acting)

Personal details
- Born: William K. Thierfelder Manhattan, New York, U.S.
- Spouse: Mary Thierfelder
- Education: University of Maryland (BA); Boston University (MA, PhD)
- Profession: Academic administrator
- Website: Belmont Abbey Leadership

William K. Thierfelder is an American businessman, academic administrator, and former high jumper who served as the 20th president of Belmont Abbey College from 2004 to 2025.

== Early life and career ==
William K. Thierfelder was born in Manhattan and raised in the Bronx where his father, William P. Thierfelder, was vice president of the New York Yankees. He holds a Bachelor of Arts in psychology from the University of Maryland and both a master's degree and a doctoral degree in sports psychology and human movement from Boston University. He is a licensed psychologist, a two-time NCAA Division I All-American in the high jump, a former NCAA Division I coach, and a former member of the United States Olympic Committee's Sports Psychology Registry. He was an Olympian, but did not compete due to an injury.

Prior to his selection as the 20th President of Belmont Abbey College, Thierfelder served as President of the York Barbell Company in York, Pennsylvania. He has also served as the Executive Director of the Player Management Group, LLC; National Director of Sport Science at NovaCare; and was the founder and President of ProSportDoc, Inc. Thierfelder is a former certified member of the National Strength and Conditioning Association as well as the American College of Sports Medicine. He is a member of the American Psychological Association and has previously served as an adjunct Professor of Surgery for Penn State University's Milton S. Hershey College of Medicine.

In 2007, Thierfelder was named Boston University School of Education's Alumnus of the Year; he was inducted into the Sports Faith International Hall of Fame in 2011. He is a Knight of the Sovereign Military Order of Malta and is the author of Less Than A Minute To Go: The Secret To World-Class Performance in Sport, Business and Everyday Life.

He retired in 2025.

== Personal life ==
He and his wife, Mary, and their ten children, live outside Charlotte, North Carolina.
