= Eddie Gossage =

American public speaker and businessman (1958–2024)

- Born: William Edgar Gossage; October 15, 1958; Nashville, Tennessee, U.S.
- Died: May 16, 2024 (aged 65)
- Education: Middle Tennessee State University (BA)
- Occupations: Racing promoter, race track general manager, public speaker
- Years active: 1980–2024
- Organization: Texas Motor Speedway
- Spouses: Lena Jane Williams (m. 1979; div. 1997) Melinda Marie Cobb (m. 1999)
- Children: 2
- Parents: Howell Lee Gossage (father); Martha Lucille Gossage (mother)
- Website: eddiegossage.com

William Edgar Gossage (October 15, 1958 – May 16, 2024) was an American motorsports executive and promoter. He was best known as the president of the Texas Motor Speedway, a 1.5-mile (2.4 km) banked racetrack in Fort Worth, Texas, which ran stock car racing and Indy car racing events throughout his tenure. He also was employed at other companies, holding various public relations positions.

Gossage was born and raised in Nashville, Tennessee. In 1980, he obtained his first major publicity job when he was hired by the Nashville Fairgrounds Speedway. After a brief stint with the Bristol Motor Speedway, he transferred to be the public relations director for the Miller Brewing Company's racing program for six years. Afterward, he was hired by Charlotte Motor Speedway president and racing promoter H. A. "Humpy" Wheeler in 1989 to become the vice president of public relations at the speedway. In 1995, he was promoted by Speedway Motorsports owner Bruton Smith and placed in charge of building the newly-announced Texas Motor Speedway, becoming the track's general manager. After his retirement from the position in 2021, he focused on a motivational speaking career.

Throughout his tenure at the Texas Motor Speedway, Gossage ran various races and concerts that attracted over 200,000 people per event. A protégé of Wheeler, he has also spurred the creation of a myriad of promotions and campaigns to promote the speedway, later being regarded as the last "old-school promoter" in racing. His advertising campaigns and promotions have sometimes been viewed as controversial in the motorsports landscape, turning Gossage into one of the most polarizing figures in auto racing.

== Early life ==
Gossage was born on October 15, 1958, in Nashville, Tennessee, to Howell Lee Gossage (1927–1998) and Martha Lucille Craighead (1928–1994). He is the middle child with an older brother named Jeff. His father worked at a packing house near the Cumberland River after dropping out of high school in his freshman year to serve in the United States Navy. According to himself, Gossage's early childhood heroes were Muhammad Ali and Evel Knievel, both of whom he saw while watching Wide World of Sports. Both celebrities influenced his interest in promoting. He later started his promotional career when he hosted events in his parents' backyard.

According to Gossage, his family lived in the middle class, with the family not having anything except "a roof over our head". While playing various sports for Pioneer Christian Academy in high school, Gossage had ambitions of playing for the Green Bay Packers. Playing as an end for Pioneer Christian, midway through his high school career, he decided to switch his focus towards journalism and writing, instead wanting to become the public relations director for the Packers. Graduating from Pioneer Christian in 1976, he committed to Middle Tennessee State University (MTSU), where he majored in journalism. While at MTSU, Gossage wrote articles and was the sports editor for the university's student newspaper, The Sidelines, along with interning at The Tennessean sports department. While working for The Sidelines, he met his first wife, Jane.

== Business and promotional career ==
=== Early promotional career ===
While at Middle Tennessee, Gossage considered getting a job at the local Nashville International Raceway. After getting a recommendation from fellow Tennessean sportswriter Larry Woody, he was hired to become the director of public relations at the speedway in April 1980. He earned $9,000 (adjusted for inflation, $35,168) annually for the job. According to himself, the work he did for the speedway was strenuous; he, on numerous occasions, had to be the janitor, a grass-keeper, the chef, and the pace car driver. He initially regretted the job, stating that he thought his parents had thought he had wasted four years of college education to earn a low-paying job. In addition, the job delayed his graduation from Middle Tennessee to 1982.

In January 1981, Nashville attorney Gary Baker bought full control of the Bristol International Raceway after being the co-owner of the speedway for three years. With the purchase, Baker owned both Nashville International Raceway and Bristol International Raceway. As a result of the purchase, Baker moved Gossage to become the assistant general manager and the public relations director of Bristol International Raceway in February, with Tom Roberts taking his place at Nashville. Under Gossage's work, the Bristol International Raceway saw renovations and improvement, bringing over $20 million (adjusted for inflation, $70,827,233) in revenue to the Tri-Cities area annually. Along with this, he, along with Baker, negotiated the live coverages of races held at Bristol and for the speedway to host events for the 1982 World's Fair. He also made attempts to try and broaden the market of stock car racing, which at the time had been stuck to a mainly Southeastern and Appalachian market.

In November 1981, California businessman Warner W. Hodgdon purchased half of the interest from Baker for the Bristol International Raceway. By late 1983, Hodgdon managed to purchase complete control of both the Bristol International Raceway and the Nashville International Raceway, where both Gossage and Roberts worked, respectively. Hodgdon was heavily disliked, according to Roberts, who called him "one of the biggest charlatans I had ever encountered"; Gossage and Roberts made efforts to look for another job. By September, Gossage had resigned from his position at the Bristol International Raceway.

The next month, Gossage joined the Miller Brewing Company, based in Milwaukee, Wisconsin, as the marketing communications supervisor for the company's racing program. During this timespan, he reported that he had to spend 40 weekends a year traveling to events, exposing him to several types of racing, including CART, IMSA, NHRA, hydroplanes, and tractor pulling. During his tenure at Miller, he hired Roberts, assisted longtime NASCAR driver Bobby Allison in 1985 in his move to Stavola Brothers Racing, and had to announce the injury statuses of both Allison and Mike Alexander, both of whom were injured in 1988. However, by 1989, Gossage grew tired of constant traveling that the company required. As a result, he left the Miller Brewing Company and joined the Charlotte Motor Speedway in February 1989 as the vice president of public relations.

==== Charlotte Motor Speedway ====
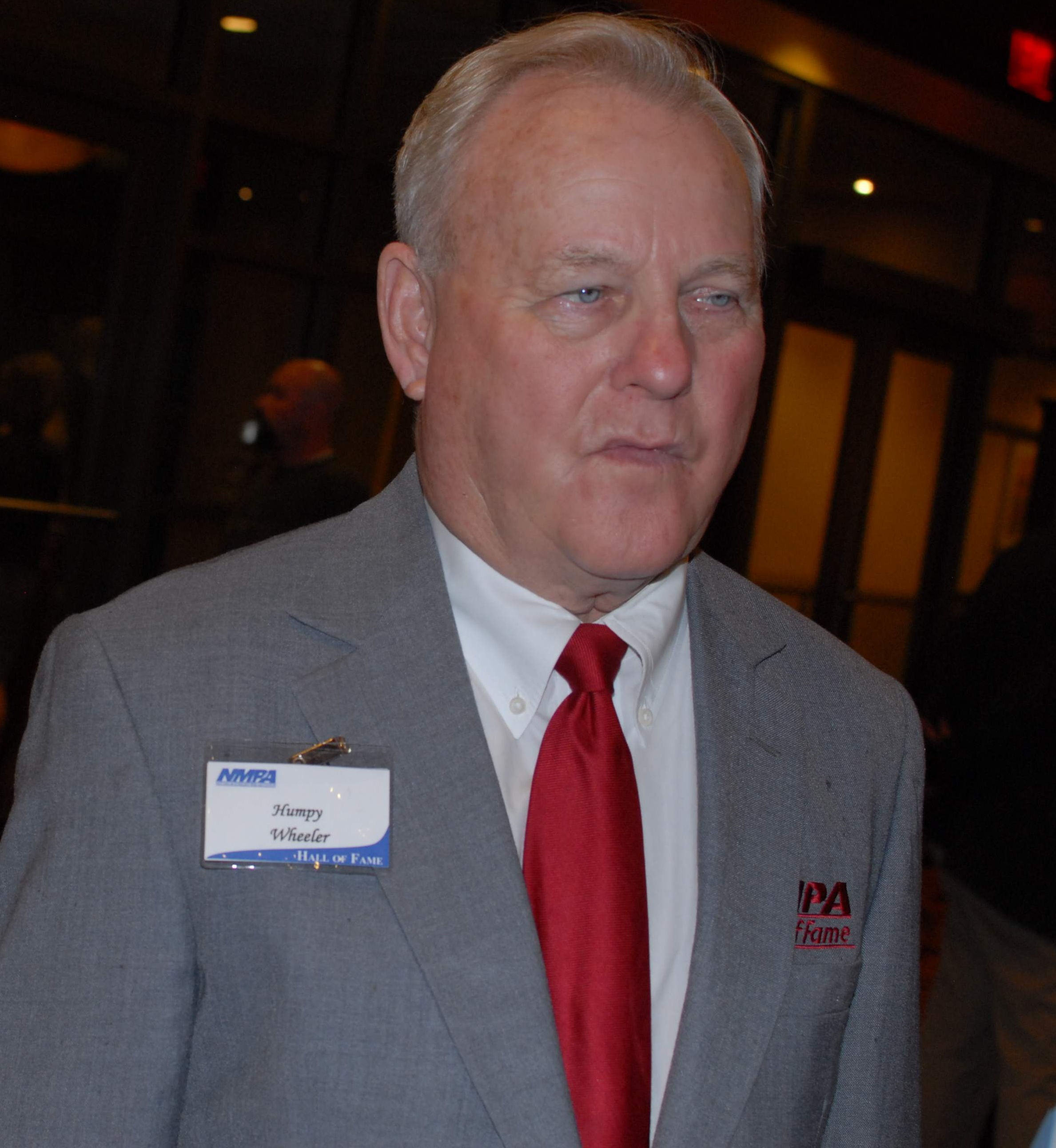
Gossage worked under Charlotte Motor Speedway promoter Humpy Wheeler (pictured above) from 1989 to 1994. Gossage credited Wheeler for much of his success.

Gossage worked under the president and general manager of the Charlotte Motor Speedway and longtime promoter Humpy Wheeler throughout his tenure at the speedway. Before his tenure, the position was considered to be one of the most feared, with many having quit in a short time period. According to Wheeler, he called the position "the most pressured job in racing, mostly because of moi [sic]". Gossage frequently got into heated arguments with Wheeler, whom he described as having "nine personalities". However, he credited much of his success and influence from Wheeler, with Gossage serving the position longer than anyone before his tenure. He stated that, "he made you better... he made everyone do better than they think they can".

He was one of the main catalysts for the "One Hot Night" promotion for the 1992 The Winston, when the Charlotte Motor Speedway put up lights to illuminate the track for night racing, a feat seen as unprecedented because no track of its size had ever been illuminated successfully. During a "grand opening" and the first public testing of the lights, Bruton Smith, Gossage's boss and then-owner of the Charlotte Motor Speedway, was invited to switch on the lights by using a prop switch. When Smith flipped the prop switch, pyrotechnics that shot off the top of the switch malfunctioned, leading to sparks hitting Smith's head, burning him. The incident was recorded by the local Charlotte media and later sent nationally via satellite. While Smith was only treated as an outpatient for burns on his head, Gossage thought that due to the incident, he would be fired immediately. Gossage was told by Smith that he had taken the promotion "a little too far" before Smith headed to the hospital to be treated as an outpatient.

To his surprise, he was not fired by Smith the next day. Wheeler told Gossage to send a fire extinguisher to Smith's office, stating that Smith had a "good sense of humor". Smith later called Gossage to tell him that Smith's friends in Hawaii had seen footage of the incident on television, asking him how the video spread that far. When Gossage told Smith that he had sent the footage out via satellite for a cost of $600 (adjusted for inflation, $1,377), Smith thought Gossage was a "genius" for managing to get the footage out nationwide for a low cost.

=== Texas Motor Speedway ===
==== Early years and turmoil ====
By 1994, Gossage and Smith formed a strong relationship. In that same year, Smith, with the rising success of SMI, wanted to build a new track west of the Mississippi River. Smith called Gossage to head the project in secret, telling Gossage to "not tell Humpy". Three locations were scouted for the new speedway. A location in North Las Vegas, Nevada, was considered until Gossage found out that local businessman Ralph Engelstad had been looking at the same piece of land to build what would eventually become the Las Vegas Motor Speedway. Smith agreed with Engelstad to not prospect the land any further, leaving the area to Engelstad. Later, the duo made trips to St. Louis and the Dallas–Fort Worth metroplex. By November, the Fort Worth Star-Telegram reported that Smith and Gossage had made their final choices in either of the two places.

In St. Louis, the duo found various parcels of land that had been recently flooded by the Mississippi River. Knowing that they could not hold racing in areas that could easily flood, the two scratched off St. Louis as the final construction site for the speedway. In Dallas–Fort Worth, the duo met businessman Ross Perot Jr. and flew in Perot's helicopter to scout a piece of land that was owned by Perot. After the two saw the land and its surrounding area, Gossage mouthed to Smith, "This is it!", with Smith agreeing. By November 30, the Star-Telegram reported that the two were going to build a 150,000-capacity speedway in an undetermined location at a cost of around $75,000,000 (adjusted for inflation, $162,915,357).

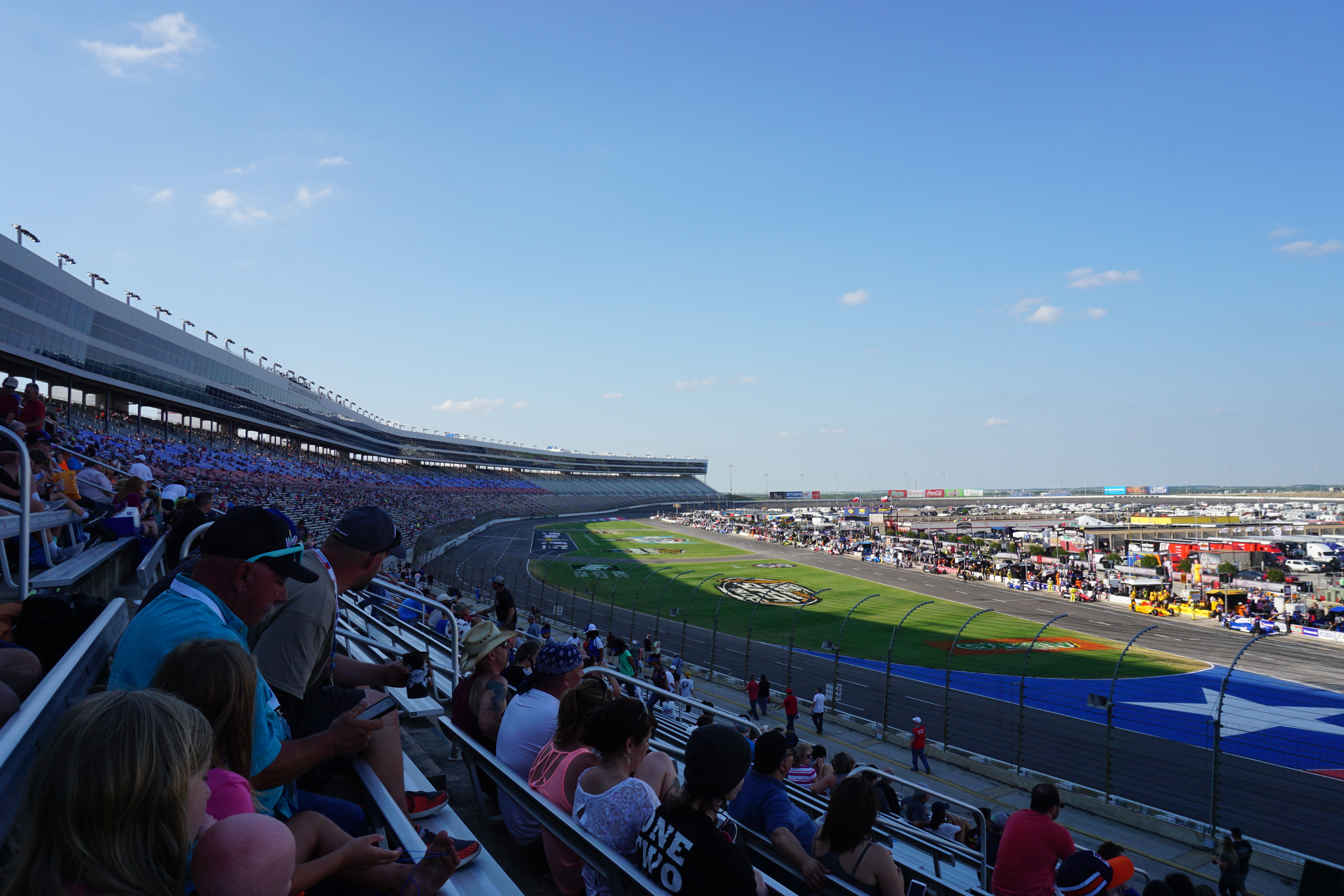
The Texas Motor Speedway pictured in 2017. Gossage and Bruton Smith were instrumental to the track's construction.

Groundbreaking of the Texas Motor Speedway started on April 11, 1995. While Gossage was then told by Smith to worry about "working for Humpy" and not Texas, to Gossage's disappointment, in late May, Smith suddenly offered him the job of running the speedway, which he accepted. According to Smith and Gossage, the track was inspired by many aspects of previous tracks that Smith owned, wanting to incorporate the best aspects from those tracks and expanding on those ideas for Texas. In July 1996, dates for a NASCAR Winston Cup Series race were set, with a date from the North Wilkesboro Speedway being moved to Texas; this move generated considerable controversy, as North Wilkesboro had been a mainstay on the NASCAR schedule since NASCAR's beginning. A date was set in April 1997. The next month, Gossage announced that the Indy Racing League (IRL) would stage the first ever night race held at the speedway, to be held in June.

The track immediately saw turmoil in its first couple of years. In the track's first year, at the Interstate Batteries 500, heavy rain had come during the race's weekend, causing qualifying to be cancelled and the grass parking lots of the speedway to be heavily soaked. While the issue was eventually resolved by using busses, further issues were raised when drivers started to complain about the surface of the race track, leading to a major first lap pileup. Two months later at the IRL race, the 1997 True Value 500, a scoring dispute between Billy Boat and Arie Luyendyk occurred when Luyendyk disputed the victory that was initially given to Boat. While Boat and his team owner, A. J. Foyt, were celebrating in victory lane, Luyendyk went to victory lane to dispute the victory, stating that the unofficial scoring had counted him one lap short. While there, he demanded an explanation from officials and claimed that he had won the race. Foyt proceeded to slap Luyendyk on the back of his head, knocking him to the ground before security separated the two. After a scoring recheck, Luyendyk was declared the official winner, with the scoring error being blamed on a computer glitch. After both races, Gossage announced that the speedway would reprofile the fourth turn, a source of many complaints.

Complaints lasted in 1998, with drivers complaining of a new bump in the turn. After a t-shirt printed by NASCAR that stated "Shut Up and Race" became a source of controversy that accused Gossage of not taking complaints seriously, he pledged to fix the turn after the race, this time with more success. After the race, Gossage submitted his letter of resignation from his position, stating in interviews with reporter Terry Blount in 2009, "I knew [Bruton] needed a scapegoat. So many bad things had happened... Maybe Bruton would be better off with someone else in charge." However, Bruton adamantly refused to allow him to leave, stating his confidence that he had picked the right person to run the track.

In its earliest years, the speedway hosted multiple large concerts. Days after the 1997 IRL race, a two-day country music festival, Country Fest, was held at the speedway. The event attracted around 260,000 people. A week later, the speedway held RockFest '97, a rock music festival that attracted around 400,000 people. In 1999 and 2000, the speedway held NASCAR Winston Cup Series races that attracted 221,861 and 223,000 people, respectively, some of the largest attendance numbers on record for a NASCAR race. In 2001, the track planned to run a Championship Auto Racing Teams (CART) race, the Firestone Firehawk 600, but the race was eventually cancelled after it was found that drivers would suffer extreme vertical g-loads that could have led to death. Gossage and the speedway eventually sued CART for breach of contract, settling for an unspecified amount in the "multimillions". In addition, CART races in 2002 and 2003 were annulled.

==== Later years, repave ====
With the city of Dallas proposing a bid to host the 2012 Summer Olympics, in 2000, Gossage proposed the integration of motorsports into the Olympic Games as a demonstration sport. Gossage proposed using the speedway as a racing venue, along with using the track for several other sports. In 2002, he made attempts to move the Red River Showdown from the Cotton Bowl to the speedway, which, if implemented, would break a 71-year tradition. The decision was met with relative surprise, causing State Fair of Texas officials to state that the contract to play the game in the Cotton Bowl was set to last until 2006. The proposal never went through, though Gossage expressed new hope to host it following the Battle at Bristol in 2016. In 2007, rumors speculated that Gossage would replace the commissioner of the NHL, Gary Bettman. Both Gossage and the NHL denied the claims, with Gossage stating that he was loyal to SMI and Texas Motor Speedway.

Gossage implemented numerous format changes to the speedway's NASCAR and IndyCar races in 2011. For both NASCAR Sprint Cup races, he made the decision to run both races at nighttime, making the races the first ever NASCAR Sprint Cup Series night races held at the speedway. For the annual IndyCar race held at the speedway, he took the traditional 550-kilometer (340 mi) race and split the race into two separate 275-kilometer (171 mi) races, with both races counting as two individual races for that year's championship. In addition, half the amount of purse money and points were given for each race, and the second race's starting lineup was determined by a random draw.

In September 2013, he announced the construction of Big Hoss TV, a television that was set to become the world's largest HD video display. As a result of the construction of the video screen, the backstretch grandstand, which numbered to nearly 10,000 seats, was demolished in order to build the video screen. The video screen was completed in March 2014, in time for the 2014 Duck Commander 500 race in early April. On April 6, the video screen was officially certified by the Guinness Book of World Records as the largest HD television LED screen in the world.

Complaints were made against the Texas Motor Speedway's track surface in June 2016 for being too difficult to dry when rain came down on the track. Complaints were made again in November, when the 2016 AAA Texas 500 was delayed for seven hours due to rain. In statements made in November, Gossage stated that he had no plans to repave the track in the short-term, quoting the opinions of NASCAR drivers Jimmie Johnson and Carl Edwards. However, by January 2017, he announced the commencement of a repave, stating concerns of the track being too difficult to dry. With the repave, the banking in the first two turns was decreased from 24 to 20 degrees, and the racing surface was expanded from 60 to 80 feet. He later credited SMI CEO Marcus G. Smith for directing the repave in February in an interview with the Fort Worth Star-Telegram.

In the later years of Gossage's tenure at Texas Motor Speedway, the speedway saw a sharp decline in attendance. By November 2019, Gossage made calls to "modernize" the speedway, calling for a decrease of capacity from 135,000 seats to a stated range from 80,000 to 90,000, along with better internet services, a wider concession variety, and more suites. Gossage also stated his defense that the track, even with decreased attendance, would still fill up the grandstands of smaller tracks, like Martinsville Speedway.

=== Transition from track president to motivational speaker ===
By the summer of 2020, Gossage engaged in talks with Marcus Smith of whether to retire from being the president and general manager of the Texas Motor Speedway. Around this time, he grew upset at the IndyCar racing product that was caused by the track's surface, which had essentially been made to improve only the NASCAR racing product. In addition, he had grown worn out by consequences suffered from the COVID-19 pandemic. By early December, he stated to Smith that he would retire after working 32 years with SMI and 25 years directing the Texas Motor Speedway. The decision was publicly announced on May 13, 2021, with his retirement effective after the 2021 NASCAR All-Star Race that was set to take place on June 13. Gossage himself did not state a successor; Marcus announced on August 4 that Texas Motor Speedway executive Rob Ramage had been promoted to replace Gossage as the general manager of the speedway.

John Sturbin, a former motorsports writer for the Star-Telegram, put out a rumor that stated Gossage disagreed heavily with the moving of Texas Motor Speedway's spring date in 2021 to the Circuit of the Americas, a decision made by SMI. According to the rumor put out by Sturbin, due to Gossage's disagreement, he was given an ultimatum by Marcus to either resign or to be fired by SMI. Gossage denied the rumor, stating, "There’s no truth to that at all, absolutely not. I would have a problem (with COTA) were it not for the fact that it’s us... it’s [managed by] Speedway Motorsports. Know what I mean?"

Following his retirement from Texas Motor Speedway, Gossage focused solely on a public speaking career. According to himself, the reason for transitioning to a motivational speaking career was that he had always enjoyed being a "manager of people". Having helped various prominent figures in NASCAR to get their start, such as former NASCAR president Mike Helton, he self-proclaimed that he wanted to teach people how to become the best version of themselves by teaching lessons that he himself had learned over his career. He also self-proclaimed that the job was an "extension of himself" and that "there was a certain demand" for him to become a motivational speaker.

== Promotions ==
Gossage has been considered one of the foremost promoters in auto racing, being a protégé of pioneer NASCAR promoters Bruton Smith and Humpy Wheeler. Throughout his career, Gossage has conducted many stunts and promotions that gained coverage within the local Fort Worth media landscape and the national media. According to himself, his inspirations for promotions came from boxing promoters Don King and Bob Arum.

=== "One Hot Night" ===
Along with Charlotte Motor Speedway CEO Bruton Smith and general manager Humpy Wheeler, he managed the installation of lights at the speedway as a part of a promotion to try and increase fan interest for the 1992 The Winston. By 1992, only eight iterations into the running of the event, Wheeler saw that it needed a reinvigoration, as rumors swirled that the event would be moved elsewhere. In October 1991, Wheeler announced the project, which would be completed within seven months. Eventually, the trio found Musco Lighting, a small Iowa-based company at the time, to assist with the project. The lights were installed by April 1992.

=== Texas Motor Speedway ===
In 2003, Gossage announced the creation of an all-female pit crew, with the crew serving driver Shawna Robinson for that year's O'Reilly 400K NASCAR Craftsman Truck Series race. After initial tryouts of around 20 women, seven were recruited for the pit crew. The pit crew was named the "Dream Team" with The Aaron's Company sponsoring the truck.

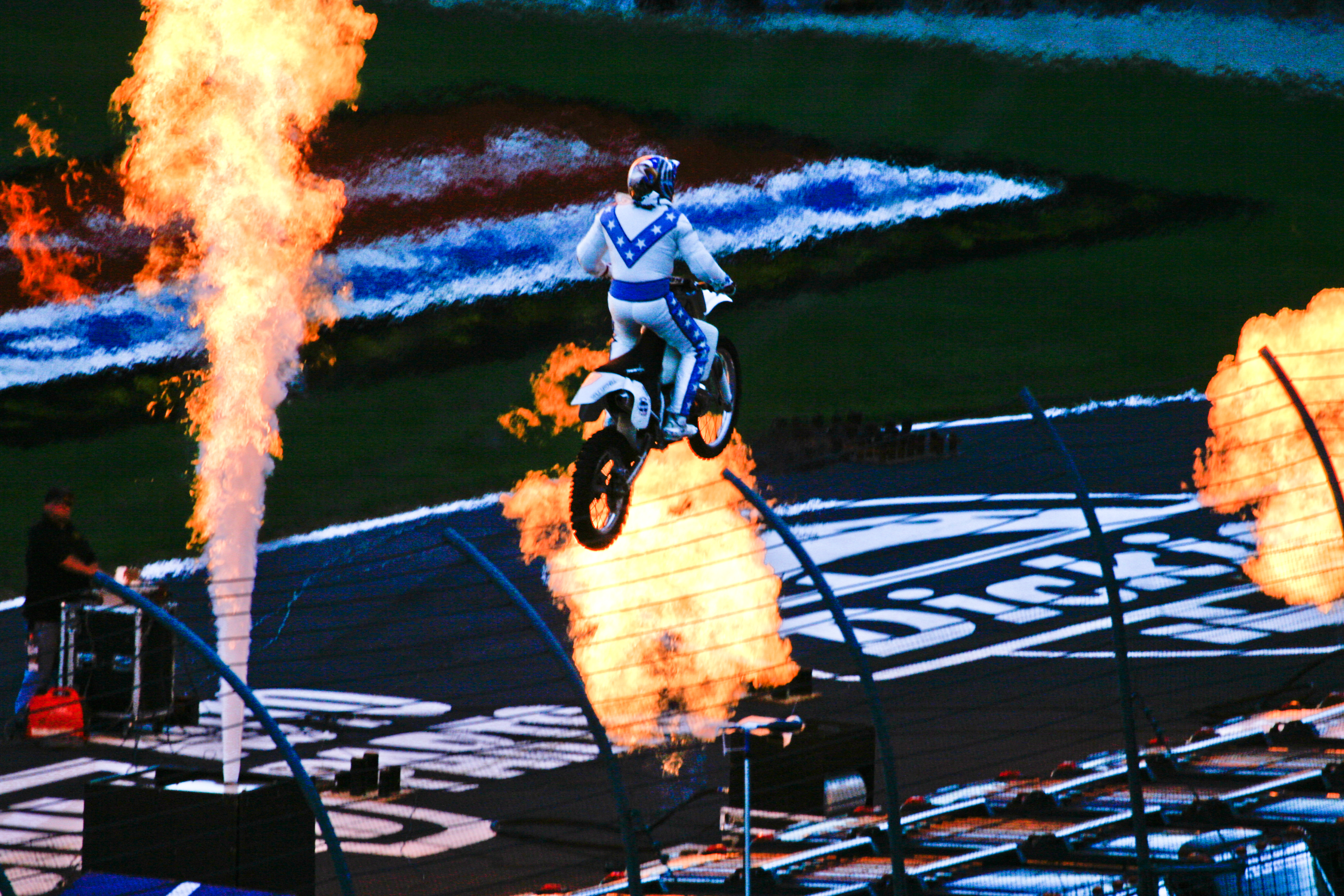
Robbie Knievel performing a stunt in 2008 at the Texas Motor Speedway as part of a promotion directed by Gossage

Starting at the 2005 Samsung/Radio Shack 500 in April, Gossage directed a tradition of the victor of each NASCAR Cup Series and IndyCar Series race held at Texas Motor Speedway shooting blank six-shooters in post-race celebrations. With only one exception for the 2017 AAA Texas 500 in the wake of the Sutherland Springs church shooting that had occurred hours before the race, the tradition became a recurring and frequent event at the speedway under Gossage's tenure. The tradition faced some criticism by gun control activists in 2013 and 2018, in the wake of the Sandy Hook Elementary School shooting and the Parkland high school shooting, respectively. After Gossage's retirement in 2021, the tradition was phased out by March 2023. Gossage announced the "No Limits" campaign for the Texas Motor Speedway in 2010, a campaign that was originally slated to only last for 2011. The campaign cost over $500,000 and was kicked off with a concert by the Goo Goo Dolls. Self-described as a "hot cars and hot chicks" campaign, the campaign was considered to target towards a edgier, younger audience. The campaign received some criticism by religious groups. He defended the campaign, stating, "You can't make the spiritual argument to me... if you're going to write me this bullshit and then tell me the Dallas Cowboy cheerleaders are wholesome. C'mon." Also in the same year, as an April Fools' Day stunt, he jokingly stated that he would give $100,000 to anyone that would legally change their name to TexasMotorSpeedway.com. As a result, local disc jockey Terry Dorsey took on the joke offer, leading to an official apology by Gossage, stating that the offer was a prank. He also attempted to train monkeys to sell souvenir programs for the 2010 AAA Texas 500. In the wake of the 2011 NASCAR Sprint Cup Series championship battle between Tony Stewart and Carl Edwards, which was at the time one of the closest in NASCAR history, he forged a promotion that pictured the two drivers in a high-stakes boxing title fight.

== Controversies and legal issues ==
=== Texas Motor Speedway naming dispute ===
While Gossage's track was under construction, in August 1996, a quarter-mile dirt track based in Alvin, Texas, sued Gossage's speedway over naming rights for the name "Texas Motor Speedway". Gossage, along with Bruton Smith, countersued on September 9 against the owners of the dirt track, stating that the owners were attempting to "squeeze and extort money" from the developers. Due to the lawsuit, Smith and Gossage announced a new name for the speedway, the Texas International Raceway, on September 11. While the litigation process was expected to take years, by December 2, the dispute was settled out of court. As part of the settlement, the dirt track agreed to change its name, with Gossage and Smith able to keep the Texas Motor Speedway moniker. Jack Holland, the majority owner of the dirt track, expressed disappointment at the decision.

=== Initial speedway surface issues, "Shut Up and Race" ===
In the first two NASCAR Winston Cup Series races at the Texas Motor Speedway in 1997 and 1998, numerous drivers complained about the surface of the speedway after a rash of accidents. In response to drivers' complaints in 1997, Gossage directed the repaving of the fourth turn to address the complaints. Days before the 1998 race, Speedway Motorsports, Inc. chairman Bruton Smith announced the creation of a new t-shirt that had the words "Shut Up and Race" printed on it. While Gossage directed some changes to the fourth turn, he did not move the wall in the turn, a source of many complaints from drivers. Gossage defended the track the day before the start of the race's weekend, comparing the fourth turn to Darlington Raceway's fourth turn, stating "A couple of drivers have said we need to move the wall in Turn 4... They've been saying that for 48 years at Darlington. Darlington should not move the wall back because that's what makes it quaint. Turn 4 is tricky. That's just the way it is."

During the race's weekend, many drivers complained about a new bump exiting the turn. To further compound problems, due to winter storms, water began to seep out of the surface in the first and second turns of the speedway. As a result of the seepages, qualifying was postponed from Friday to Saturday, and the final practice session of the weekend was cancelled. In response to the track's problems, drivers called for a complete repave of the track, with some disappointed at the lack of action. In the race's qualifying session, a crash involving Derrike Cope led to Cope suffering rib injuries. After the race, NASCAR leadership also began to criticize the track, with NASCAR spokesman Jeff Motley stating, "We're telling people to keep water off the race track... We're not asking for a whole lot. We want a track free of water, debris and potholes. That's not much to ask." Bill France Jr., the president of NASCAR at the time, stated, "If he'd been working for me, I'da fired his ass. Not knowing shit and him running this goddamn place." Gossage pledged to fix the seepage issues and to study the fourth turn problems after the race.

Gossage was criticized heavily by drivers and NASCAR reporters for a lack of changes made to the speedway and for trying to turn the complaints into a promotion, selling t-shirts at souvenir stands for $18. The t-shirts became a major point of controversy, with many drivers believing that the shirts had mocked them unnecessarily. As a response to the t-shirts and further problems with the track itself, Gossage responded humorously, stating that new "Shut Up and Fix It" shirts would be made. Years after the race, Gossage admitted that the promotion was done by NASCAR, stating, "NASCAR licensed the t-shirt and bumper sticker. Sometimes you take the beating. We didn't do it, but we took the hit for it."

=== 2001 Firestone Firehawk 600 ===
In August 2000, Gossage announced that the Texas Motor Speedway was scheduled to hold a Championship Auto Racing Teams (CART) race, to be held in April 2001. According to Gossage, when the contract was signed in July 2000, both parties agreed that the cars would have to be slowed down in order to run the race. Months before the race, Gossage sent at least five letters to CART and the league's chairman, Joe Heitzler. Some of the content in Gossage's letters requested CART to "de-tune" the engines, run open tests, and to make the suspension of the cars stronger. Gossage suggested speeds of around 220–225 miles per hour. In response, CART made adjustments to the track, but not the cars themselves, seen by Gossage as a distraction to not slow the cars down.

In December, CART driver Kenny Bräck ran a test session at the speedway. While Bräck ran over 100 laps with a top average speed of 221 miles per hour (356 km/h), the target speed was 225 miles per hour (362 km/h). Gossage later claimed that Bräck had purposely sandbagged the session under orders from CART. Bräck disputed the claim, stating, "It wasn’t like we were there testing and sandbagging... I remember there were very heavy gust of winds [sic]... which we had to adjust the car for, so we knew we were going to be quicker in somewhat more normal conditions." Later private tests in the following months followed, with further accused sandbagging. In March, Maurício Gugelmin, who ran a private test with PacWest Racing in February, stated his belief that CART could not run the race in a teleconference with Gossage and CART officials, stating that the car was too fast for the track. Later concerns were not made about the speeds but rather the roughness of the circuit.

On race weekend, average lap speeds saw upwards of 233 miles per hour (375 km/h) during the weekend's qualifying sessions. During Friday's afternoon practice session, Gugelmin crashed in the third turn. By the end of Saturday, some drivers started to complain about dizziness and disorientation after getting out of their cars. By this point, CART officials were deciding how to slow down the cars in a Saturday evening meeting. In that same meeting, CART doctors, including Steve Olvey, concluded that the drivers could not race over 225 mph without suffering g-forces that could cause death. Track owner Bruton Smith, who was in the meeting alongside Gossage, reported that he did not understand most of the meeting, stating at the end of the meeting to Gossage, "These gentlemen have to figure out how to slow these cars down before tomorrow morning." On race day, 65,000 fans were ticketed, but the warm-up session was cancelled. Two hours before the race, the race was officially announced to be postponed. CART had invited Gossage to join the official announcement, but Gossage adamantly refused, ordering his public relations staff to remove logos of SMI from tables and podiums. After CART made their official announcement, Gossage held his own conference, stating, "CART should have known."

In the following days, local Fort Worth media doubted if the event would ever go on. On May 2, it was officially announced that the race would not be rescheduled. A week later, Gossage and SMI sued CART for breach of contract, with cited damages including 60,000 tickets, purse, the $2.1 million sanction fee, and additional compensation for promotional expenses, lost profits, and other damages. During the suit, it subsequently emerged that CART had ignored repeated requests to conduct testing at TMS before the aborted race. On October 16, the lawsuit was settled for an undisclosed amount along with annulled races in 2002 and 2003. The way the incident was handled was widely criticized and was viewed as a critical moment in the eventual downfall of CART.

=== Promotions ===
==== Dale Earnhardt Jr. billboard ====
Throughout early 2008, Gossage directed the creation of a promotional campaign named "Reasons Why" for the 2008 Samsung 500. For the promotion, 12 billboard advertisements were made that featured NASCAR stars, with one referencing Dale Earnhardt Jr.'s move from his family-owned team, Dale Earnhardt, Inc., to Hendrick Motorsports. Among said reasons about why Earnhardt Jr. had left the team was because of business tensions between Dale and Teresa Earnhardt, Dale Earnhardt, Inc. owner and his stepmother. To promote the race, the Dale Earnhardt Jr. billboard made references to the tensions between Dale and Teresa, with his billboard reading "Reason #88: Step-Mom". Kelley Earnhardt Miller, Dale's sister, opposed the billboard and called on Gossage to replace it. He replaced the billboard with a new slogan that gained Kelley's approval.

==== 2013 NRA 500 ====
For the 2013 NASCAR Sprint Cup Series spring race at the Texas Motor Speedway, both Gossage and NASCAR announced in early March that the race was to be sponsored by the National Rifle Association of America (NRA), a gun rights advocacy group that had gained significant controversy. While initially praised by the local Fort Worth media, the sponsorship became controversial nationwide for multiple reasons. While it was not the first time the NRA had sponsored a race in the top three divisions of NASCAR, the announcement came months after the Sandy Hook Elementary School shooting in Connecticut. Along with this, NASCAR gave the final approval for the sponsor, which stirred controversy among gun control activists. Days before the race itself, Gossage denied the race would become "NRA propaganda", stating, "no one is going to force any NRA literature in your hands... It's going to be a race. We are going to have a winner and have a lot of fun, and that's going to be the extent of it."

As a result of the announcement, Democratic senator Chris Murphy of Connecticut, an ardent gun control advocate, pleaded with News Corporation owner Rupert Murdoch for Fox Sports to not broadcast the race and requested Gossage to discontinue the tradition of the victor shooting two non-loaded revolvers in victory lane. Gossage dismissed the complaints, calling Murphy's complaint a "publicity effort", with Fox Sports airing the race as scheduled.

After the race, spectator Kirk Franklin committed suicide by shooting a gun to his head after engaging in an argument with other spectators. As a result of the suicide, NASCAR ordered public relations representatives and reporters to not interview drivers with the NRA logo behind them. NASCAR later pledged to reevaluate its race sponsorships after the race concluded.

==== Phil Robertson prayer ====
For the 2016 Duck Commander 500, Gossage invited Phil Robertson, the president of Duck Commander, to deliver the pre-race prayer, a ceremony that occurs at all NASCAR races. During the prayer, Robertson made statements that he desired to have a "Jesus man" elected in the 2016 United States presidential election, stating, "I pray, Father, that we put a Jesus man in the White House. Help us do that and help us all to repent, to do what is right, to love you more and to love each other." The prayer and Gossage were both later criticized for politicizing a sporting event. Gossage defended Robertson in an interview given by the Fort Worth Star-Telegram, stating, "He said what he felt and believed and there are a lot of people that agree with him and a lot that disagree with him. Nowadays, you cannot say what you think because of political correctness. So I guess everyone has a right to free speech or nobody does."

== Personal life ==
When not working, he described himself as a "much quieter and shy person than people really think when they get to know me". Dustin, one of Eddie's children, described Eddie as having two personalities that separated his work career from his personal life. Describing Eddie as a "family guy", Dustin praised his father in an interview with Kickin' The Tires, stating, "[when] he is out there when he is, kind of, the ringmaster... when he is in his private life with the kids and everything, he is as loving as big a kid because you have to be a kid to do the things that he does."

Gossage considered himself politically conservative, having been asked by the Tea Party movement to run for office in Texas. However, Gossage stated his intentions to never run for public office as a Republican, stating that he is "too honest". In 1995, he was described as a "Ronald Reagan Republican" with mixed views on abortion, compared to his wife at the time, who supported it.

=== Marriages and divorce ===
Gossage met his first wife, Lena Jane Williams, while working for The Sidelines. According to Gossage, Williams' "spunky [and] feisty" nature the first time the two met had attracted him. While Lena had initially thought Eddie was a "smart-ass", after going on four or five dates, the two started to think about marriage. Eventually, the two married in 1979 in McMinn County, Tennessee. However, the two divorced in 1997, with Eddie refusing to state reasons on why the two divorced. Eddie married his second wife, Melinda Marie Cobb, on March 27, 1999, at the Speedway Club at the Texas Motor Speedway. Before the marriage, Melinda had been Eddie's former secretary at the speedway.

Gossage had two children, both born while he was married to Williams. His first child, Jessica Amber, was born on December 18, 1980. His second child, Dustin, was born 10 months later.

=== Illnesses and death ===
In late 2008, Gossage was diagnosed with cancer; he began treatment early the following year. In September 2009, Gossage announced that his cancer was in complete remission. He officially announced in March 2010 that he had beaten the cancer. Nevertheless, the cancer returned, and Gossage died on May 16, 2024, at the age of 65.

== Legacy and honors ==
Gossage is considered to be one of the last "old-school" racing promoters, compared to the likes of Charlotte Motor Speedway's Humpy Wheeler and Atlanta Motor Speedway's Ed Clark, both of whom have retired. In 2009, he stated that he had become the last "old-school" promoter, stating that, "We don't have promoters anymore. We have track operators. I think [auto racing] became so successful that everyone got fat, happy and lazy." He has gained wide publicity for his promotions, some of which have garnered controversy within the national media landscape. Many industry executives praised Gossage on his promotions in the wake of his retirement. Larry Woody, who since moved on from The Tennessean to work at Main Street Nashville and the person who recommended Gossage a job at the Nashville International Speedway, praised Gossage for his promotions in 2021, stating, "the sport won’t be nearly as much fun" when Gossage retired. Bruton Smith, the founder of SMI, stated that Gossage never strayed away from the goal of "having fun", stating, "he's been a promoter, friend, and an asset to the entire motorsports industry". Bruton's son and the current president of SMI, Marcus G. Smith, described Gossage's contributions to SMI as "immeasurable".

=== Recognition ===
- In 2001, he received the inaugural Promoter of the Year award from the Indy Racing League.
- In 2015, he received the Advertising Innovation and Marketing Excellence Award from the Dallas–Fort Worth chapters of the American Marketing Association and the American Advertising Federation.
- In 2017, he received the Middle Tennessee State University Distinguished Alumnus Award.
- In 2018, Eldora Speedway renamed their infield tunnel, the Love Tunnel, as the Gossage Tunnel as a humorous reference to a former complaint made by the track's owner, Tony Stewart, against the Texas Motor Speedway.
