= Grand Prix of Texas =

The Grand Prix of Texas was an American Le Mans Series sports car race held at the infield road course of the Texas Motor Speedway in Fort Worth, Texas. The 2001 event marked the last time the ALMS raced on a roval.

== Results ==
Year	Class	Drivers	Team	Car	Duration/Distance	Race title	Report	Ref
2000	LMP	(Germany) Frank Biela (Italy) Emanuele Pirro	(Germany) Audi Sport North America	Audi R8	2 Hours, 45 Minutes	Grand Prix of Texas	report	
2000	GTS	(United States) Andy Pilgrim (Canada) Ron Fellows	(United States) Corvette Racing	Chevrolet Corvette C5-R	2 Hours, 45 Minutes	Grand Prix of Texas	report	
2000	GT	(United States) Randy Pobst (Belgium) Bruno Lambert	(United States) Alex Job Racing	Porsche 911 (996) GT3-R	2 Hours, 45 Minutes	Grand Prix of Texas	report	
2001	LMP	(Denmark) Tom Kristensen (Italy) Rinaldo Capello	(Germany) Audi Sport North America	Audi R8	2 Hours, 45 Minutes	Leather Center Grand Prix of Texas	report	
2001	GTS	(Canada) Ron Fellows (United States) Johnny O'Connell	(United States) Corvette Racing	Chevrolet Corvette C5-R	2 Hours, 45 Minutes	Leather Center Grand Prix of Texas	report	
2001	GT	(Germany) Lucas Luhr (Germany) Sascha Maassen	(United States) Alex Job Racing	Porsche 911 (996) GT3-RS	2 Hours, 45 Minutes	Leather Center Grand Prix of Texas	report	
