= 1998 Texas 500 =

American stock car race

Race details
- Race 7 of 33 in the 1998 NASCAR Winston Cup Series
- The 1998 Texas 500 program cover, with artwork by NASCAR artist Sam Bass.
- Date: April 5, 1998
- Official name: Second Annual Texas 500
- Location: Fort Worth, Texas, Texas Motor Speedway
- Course: Permanent racing facility
- Course length: 1.5 miles (2.41 km)
- Distance: 334 laps, 501 mi (806.281 km)
- Average speed: 136.771 miles per hour (220.112 km/h)

Pole position
Driver	Jeremy Mayfield	Penske-Kranefuss Racing
- Time: 29.047

Most laps led
Driver	Jeremy Mayfield	Penske-Kranefuss Racing
- Laps: 105

Winner
No. 6	Mark Martin	Roush Racing

Television in the United States
- Network: CBS
- Announcers: Mike Joy, Ned Jarrett, Buddy Baker

Radio in the United States
- Radio: Performance Racing Network

The 1998 Texas 500 was the seventh stock car race of the 1998 NASCAR Winston Cup Series season and the second iteration of the event. The race was held on Sunday, April 5, 1998, in Fort Worth, Texas at Texas Motor Speedway, a 1.5 miles (2.4 km) permanent tri-oval shaped racetrack. The race took the scheduled 334 laps to complete. In the closing laps of the race, Roush Racing driver Mark Martin would manage to fend off teammate Chad Little to take his 24th career NASCAR Winston Cup Series victory and his second victory of the season. To fill out the podium, Little and Jasper Motorsports driver Robert Pressley would finish second and third, respectively.

== Background ==
The layout of Texas Motor Speedway, the venue where the race was held.

Texas Motor Speedway is a speedway located in the northernmost portion of Fort Worth, Texas. The track measures 1.5 miles (2.4 km) around and is banked 24 degrees in the turns, and is of the oval design, where the front straightaway juts outward slightly. The track is owned by Speedway Motorsports.

=== Entry list ===
- (R) denotes rookie driver.

#	Driver	Team	Make
1	Darrell Waltrip	Dale Earnhardt, Inc.	Chevrolet
2	Rusty Wallace	Penske-Kranefuss Racing	Ford
3	Dale Earnhardt	Richard Childress Racing	Chevrolet
4	Bobby Hamilton	Morgan–McClure Motorsports	Chevrolet
5	Terry Labonte	Hendrick Motorsports	Chevrolet
6	Mark Martin	Roush Racing	Ford
7	Geoff Bodine	Mattei Motorsports	Ford
8	Hut Stricklin	Stavola Brothers Racing	Chevrolet
9	Lake Speed	Melling Racing	Ford
10	Ricky Rudd	Rudd Performance Motorsports	Ford
11	Brett Bodine	Brett Bodine Racing	Ford
12	Jeremy Mayfield	Penske-Kranefuss Racing	Ford
13	Jerry Nadeau (R)	Elliott-Marino Racing	Ford
16	Ted Musgrave	Roush Racing	Ford
18	Bobby Labonte	Joe Gibbs Racing	Pontiac
21	Michael Waltrip	Wood Brothers Racing	Ford
22	Ward Burton	Bill Davis Racing	Pontiac
23	Jimmy Spencer	Haas-Carter Motorsports	Ford
24	Jeff Gordon	Hendrick Motorsports	Chevrolet
26	Johnny Benson Jr.	Roush Racing	Ford
28	Kenny Irwin Jr. (R)	Robert Yates Racing	Ford
30	Derrike Cope	Bahari Racing	Pontiac
31	Mike Skinner	Richard Childress Racing	Chevrolet
33	Ken Schrader	Andy Petree Racing	Chevrolet
35	Todd Bodine	ISM Racing	Pontiac
36	Ernie Irvan	MB2 Motorsports	Pontiac
40	Sterling Marlin	Team SABCO	Chevrolet
41	Steve Grissom	Larry Hedrick Motorsports	Chevrolet
42	Joe Nemechek	Team SABCO	Chevrolet
43	John Andretti	Petty Enterprises	Pontiac
44	Kyle Petty	Petty Enterprises	Pontiac
46	Wally Dallenbach Jr.	Team SABCO	Chevrolet
47	Billy Standridge	Standridge Motorsports	Chevrolet
50	Randy LaJoie	Hendrick Motorsports	Chevrolet
71	Dave Marcis	Marcis Auto Racing	Chevrolet
75	Rick Mast	Butch Mock Motorsports	Ford
77	Robert Pressley	Jasper Motorsports	Ford
78	Gary Bradberry	Triad Motorsports	Ford
81	Kenny Wallace	FILMAR Racing	Ford
88	Dale Jarrett	Robert Yates Racing	Ford
90	Dick Trickle	Donlavey Racing	Ford
91	Kevin Lepage (R)	LJ Racing	Chevrolet
94	Bill Elliott	Elliott-Marino Racing	Ford
95	Andy Hillenburg	Sadler Brothers Racing	Chevrolet
96	David Green	American Equipment Racing	Chevrolet
97	Chad Little	Roush Racing	Ford
98	Greg Sacks	Cale Yarborough Motorsports	Ford
99	Jeff Burton	Roush Racing	Ford

== Practice ==
Originally, four practice sessions were scheduled to be held, with two on Thursday, April 2, one on Friday, April 3, and one on Saturday, April 4. However, due to complaints about poor track conditions on Saturday that had occurred throughout pre-race, the final practice session was cancelled. Drivers had reported major bumps in the exit of turn 4, along with major seepage throughout the racetrack since the opening of the track in 1997.

=== First practice ===
The first practice session was held on the afternoon of Thursday, April 2. Jeremy Mayfield, driving for Penske-Kranefuss Racing, would set the fastest time in the session, with a lap of 29.652 and an average speed of 182.113 mph (293.082 km/h).

Pos.	#	Driver	Team	Make	Time	Speed
1	12	Jeremy Mayfield	Penske-Kranefuss Racing	Ford	29.652	182.113
2	23	Jimmy Spencer	Haas-Carter Motorsports	Ford	29.708	181.769
3	6	Mark Martin	Roush Racing	Ford	29.732	181.622
Full first practice results

=== Second practice ===
The third practice session was held on the evening of Thursday, April 2. Jeremy Mayfield, driving for Penske-Kranefuss Racing, would set the fastest time in the session, with a lap of 29.298 and an average speed of 184.313 mph (296.623 km/h).

Pos.	#	Driver	Team	Make	Time	Speed
1	12	Jeremy Mayfield	Penske-Kranefuss Racing	Ford	29.298	184.313
2	43	John Andretti	Petty Enterprises	Pontiac	29.439	183.430
3	6	Mark Martin	Roush Racing	Ford	29.468	183.250
Full second practice results

=== Final practice ===
The planned third, but eventual final practice session was held on the morning of Friday, April 3. Joe Nemechek, driving for Team SABCO, would set the fastest time in the session, with a lap of 29.298 and an average speed of 184.313 mph (296.623 km/h).

Pos.	#	Driver	Team	Make	Time	Speed
1	42	Joe Nemechek	Team SABCO	Chevrolet	29.183	185.039
2	88	Dale Jarrett	Robert Yates Racing	Ford	29.282	184.414
3	6	Mark Martin	Roush Racing	Ford	29.310	184.237
Full Happy Hour practice results

== Cancelled Happy Hour practice and complaints ==
While a practice session was scheduled to be run on Saturday, April 4, numerous factors throughout the race weekend would eventually lead to the cancellation of the Happy Hour practice. Two major issues would plague the weekend; first, in response to the track surfacing issues in the 1997 race, turn four was repaved. However, the repavement would lead to a major bump on the exit of turn 4. Many drivers would complain to then-Texas Motor Speedway president Eddie Gossage about the bump, saying that the transition on the exit of turn 4 should be less severe. However, in response, Gossage would say that the turn was a unique corner of the speedway, comparing the turn to turn 4 at Darlington Raceway, saying "I understand where the Winston Cup drivers are coming from, but this is what we've got. A couple of drivers have said we need to move the wall in Turn 4. They've been saying that for 48 years at Darlington. Darlington should not move the wall back because that's what makes it quaint. Turn 4 is tricky. That's just the way it is.'' The second problem was water seepage problems in every turn but turn 2 due to heavy winter rains within the local area of the speedway, which would eventually lead to postponements of qualifying and practice sessions.

Driver reactions throughout the weekend were mostly negative of the track. Robert Yates Racing driver Dale Jarrett would call for multiple-groove racing, saying that "The biggest thing here is that we need more than the one groove we have, and it would make for better racing. Right now it's just going to be a follow-the-leader type deal. If a guy gets out on the outside, he's going to get passed by a lot of cars. Long-time driver Darrell Waltrip would report that while every racetrack had "something wrong with them", that Texas Motor Speedway was new and that "when you build a racetrack new, you're supposed to eliminate all that. There's no reason here not to do what needs to be done." Most drivers would report that they had felt that their cars had been too loose throughout the weekend, leading to a surplus of wrecks during practice and qualifying. Some drivers felt that the problems had been blown out of proportion, with Jeff Burton saying "It definitely has been blown out of proportion. There's too much fuss about it. What we need more than anything else is to work a second groove up higher. Once we do that, I think you will hear a lot fewer complaints."

Then-Texas Motor Speedway president Eddie Gossage would face harsh criticism for a lack of safety improvements since the inaugural race, the 1997 Interstate Batteries 500 and for trying to turn the complaints into a marketing scheme, with Gossage and Speedway Motorsports CEO Bruton Smith selling "Shut Up and Race" t-shirts at track souvenir stands for US$18 (adjusted for inflation$, 36). In response, Gossage said that the new slogan for shirts would be to "Shut Up and Fix It" and that the track would look into fixing the bump in turn 4 along with fixing the turn 1 seepage issues.

== Qualifying ==
Qualifying was scheduled to be split into two rounds. Qualifying had run on Friday, April 3; however, after seven drivers made qualifying runs, due to complaints from drivers throughout race weekend, qualifying was eventually postponed to Saturday, April 4 with only one round. The seven drivers were forced to stand on their times on Friday.

The continuation of qualifying was held on Saturday, April 4, at 9:15 AM CST. Each driver would have one lap to set a time. Jeremy Mayfield, driving for Penske-Kranefuss Racing, would win the pole, setting a time of 29.047 and an average speed of 185.906 miles per hour (299.187 km/h).

During qualifying, numerous drivers would crash. Derrike Cope would suffer a crash in turn 4, causing him to miss a race and several broken ribs. Then, Lake Speed would crash also, but would make the race on a provisional.

Five drivers would fail to qualify: Todd Bodine, Jerry Nadeau, Andy Hillenburg, Billy Standridge, and Derrike Cope.

=== Full qualifying results ===
Pos.	#	Driver	Team	Make	Time	Speed
1	12	Jeremy Mayfield	Penske-Kranefuss Racing	Ford	29.047	185.906
2	42	Joe Nemechek	Team SABCO	Chevrolet	29.209	184.875
3	22	Ward Burton	Bill Davis Racing	Pontiac	29.211	184.862
4	28	Kenny Irwin Jr. (R)	Robert Yates Racing	Ford	29.249	184.622
5	97	Chad Little	Roush Racing	Ford	29.272	184.477
6	2	Rusty Wallace	Penske-Kranefuss Racing	Ford	29.296	184.326
7	6	Mark Martin	Roush Racing	Ford	29.317	184.193
8	77	Robert Pressley	Jasper Motorsports	Ford	29.318	184.187
9	96	David Green	American Equipment Racing	Chevrolet	29.323	184.156
10	78	Gary Bradberry	Triad Motorsports	Ford	29.325	184.143
11	18	Bobby Labonte	Joe Gibbs Racing	Pontiac	29.350	183.986
12	31	Mike Skinner	Richard Childress Racing	Chevrolet	29.378	183.811
13	88	Dale Jarrett	Robert Yates Racing	Ford	29.384	183.773
14	75	Rick Mast	Butch Mock Motorsports	Ford	29.395	183.705
15	43	John Andretti	Petty Enterprises	Pontiac	29.399	183.680
16	91	Kevin Lepage (R)	LJ Racing	Chevrolet	29.423	183.530
17	24	Jeff Gordon	Hendrick Motorsports	Chevrolet	29.450	183.362
18	11	Brett Bodine	Brett Bodine Racing	Ford	29.456	183.324
19	36	Ernie Irvan	MB2 Motorsports	Pontiac	29.478	183.187
20	10	Ricky Rudd	Rudd Performance Motorsports	Ford	29.493	183.094
21	40	Sterling Marlin	Team SABCO	Chevrolet	29.500	183.051
22	46	Wally Dallenbach Jr.	Team SABCO	Chevrolet	29.513	182.970
23	99	Jeff Burton	Roush Racing	Ford	29.534	182.840
24	50	Randy LaJoie	Hendrick Motorsports	Chevrolet	29.534	182.840
25	4	Bobby Hamilton	Morgan–McClure Motorsports	Chevrolet	29.558	182.692
26	44	Kyle Petty	Petty Enterprises	Pontiac	29.560	182.679
27	26	Johnny Benson Jr.	Roush Racing	Ford	29.571	182.611
28	98	Greg Sacks	Cale Yarborough Motorsports	Ford	29.591	182.488
29	7	Geoff Bodine	Mattei Motorsports	Ford	29.602	182.420
30	16	Ted Musgrave	Roush Racing	Ford	29.616	182.334
31	81	Kenny Wallace	FILMAR Racing	Ford	29.684	181.916
32	33	Ken Schrader	Andy Petree Racing	Chevrolet	29.688	181.892
33	8	Hut Stricklin	Stavola Brothers Racing	Chevrolet	29.700	181.818
34	3	Dale Earnhardt	Richard Childress Racing	Chevrolet	29.718	181.708
35	1	Darrell Waltrip	Dale Earnhardt, Inc.	Chevrolet	29.776	181.354
36	71	Dave Marcis	Marcis Auto Racing	Chevrolet	29.830	181.026
Provisionals
37	5	Terry Labonte	Hendrick Motorsports	Chevrolet	-*	-*
38	94	Bill Elliott	Elliott-Marino Racing	Ford	-*	-*
39	23	Jimmy Spencer	Travis Carter Enterprises	Ford	-*	-*
40	21	Michael Waltrip	Wood Brothers Racing	Ford	-*	-*
41	90	Dick Trickle	Donlavey Racing	Ford	-*	-*
42	41	Steve Grissom	Larry Hedrick Motorsports	Chevrolet	-*	-*
43	9	Lake Speed	Melling Racing	Ford	-*	-*
Failed to qualify
44	35	Todd Bodine	ISM Racing	Pontiac	29.962	180.228
45	13	Jerry Nadeau (R)	Elliott-Marino Racing	Ford	30.072	179.569
46	95	Andy Hillenburg	Sadler Brothers Racing	Chevrolet	30.416	177.538
47	47	Billy Standridge	Standridge Motorsports	Chevrolet	30.445	177.369
48	30	Derrike Cope	Bahari Racing	Pontiac	-	-
Official qualifying results

*Time not available.

== Race results ==
Fin	St	#	Driver	Team	Make	Laps	Led	Status	Pts	Winnings
1	7	6	Mark Martin	Roush Racing	Ford	334	37	running	180	$356,850
2	5	97	Chad Little	Roush Racing	Ford	334	49	running	175	$238,550
3	8	77	Robert Pressley	Jasper Motorsports	Ford	334	0	running	165	$161,750
4	2	42	Joe Nemechek	Team SABCO	Chevrolet	334	3	running	165	$162,100
5	27	26	Johnny Benson Jr.	Roush Racing	Ford	334	9	running	160	$113,650
6	37	5	Terry Labonte	Hendrick Motorsports	Chevrolet	334	0	running	150	$113,100
7	39	23	Jimmy Spencer	Travis Carter Enterprises	Ford	334	0	running	146	$106,350
8	11	18	Bobby Labonte	Joe Gibbs Racing	Pontiac	334	0	running	142	$97,300
9	40	21	Michael Waltrip	Wood Brothers Racing	Ford	334	5	running	143	$91,350
10	42	41	Steve Grissom	Larry Hedrick Motorsports	Chevrolet	334	0	running	134	$94,250
11	13	88	Dale Jarrett	Robert Yates Racing	Ford	334	51	running	135	$93,500
12	6	2	Rusty Wallace	Penske-Kranefuss Racing	Ford	334	0	running	127	$87,500
13	38	94	Bill Elliott	Elliott-Marino Racing	Ford	333	0	running	124	$81,700
14	21	40	Sterling Marlin	Team SABCO	Chevrolet	333	0	running	121	$72,600
15	3	22	Ward Burton	Bill Davis Racing	Pontiac	332	27	running	123	$78,900
16	18	11	Brett Bodine	Brett Bodine Racing	Ford	332	0	running	115	$76,550
17	26	44	Kyle Petty	Petty Enterprises	Pontiac	332	0	running	112	$75,750
18	9	96	David Green	American Equipment Racing	Chevrolet	332	0	running	109	$67,600
19	22	46	Wally Dallenbach Jr.	Team SABCO	Chevrolet	332	0	running	106	$62,500
20	43	9	Lake Speed	Melling Racing	Ford	332	0	running	103	$66,650
21	32	33	Ken Schrader	Andy Petree Racing	Chevrolet	332	0	running	100	$67,300
22	41	90	Dick Trickle	Donlavey Racing	Ford	331	0	running	97	$64,800
23	1	12	Jeremy Mayfield	Penske-Kranefuss Racing	Ford	331	105	running	104	$87,700
24	10	78	Gary Bradberry	Triad Motorsports	Ford	331	0	running	91	$52,500
25	24	50	Randy LaJoie	Hendrick Motorsports	Chevrolet	328	0	running	88	$61,600
26	25	4	Bobby Hamilton	Morgan–McClure Motorsports	Chevrolet	328	0	running	85	$60,500
27	20	10	Ricky Rudd	Rudd Performance Motorsports	Ford	315	0	overheating	82	$65,900
28	36	71	Dave Marcis	Marcis Auto Racing	Chevrolet	295	0	oil leak	79	$48,500
29	23	99	Jeff Burton	Roush Racing	Ford	276	48	running	81	$64,100
30	30	16	Ted Musgrave	Roush Racing	Ford	262	0	handling	73	$56,500
31	17	24	Jeff Gordon	Hendrick Motorsports	Chevrolet	252	0	handling	70	$66,900
32	29	7	Geoff Bodine	Mattei Motorsports	Ford	248	0	ignition	67	$53,200
33	12	31	Mike Skinner	Richard Childress Racing	Chevrolet	247	0	crash	64	$42,700
34	31	81	Kenny Wallace	FILMAR Racing	Ford	214	0	handling	61	$41,700
35	34	3	Dale Earnhardt	Richard Childress Racing	Chevrolet	205	0	running	58	$58,200
36	35	1	Darrell Waltrip	Dale Earnhardt, Inc.	Chevrolet	185	0	transmission	55	$39,675
37	16	91	Kevin Lepage (R)	LJ Racing	Chevrolet	148	0	running	52	$39,675
38	28	98	Greg Sacks	Cale Yarborough Motorsports	Ford	135	0	crash	49	$44,675
39	4	28	Kenny Irwin Jr. (R)	Robert Yates Racing	Ford	80	0	crash	46	$52,675
40	33	8	Hut Stricklin	Stavola Brothers Racing	Chevrolet	11	0	crash	43	$37,675
41	14	75	Rick Mast	Butch Mock Motorsports	Ford	1	0	crash	40	$37,575
42	15	43	John Andretti	Petty Enterprises	Pontiac	1	0	crash	37	$52,525
43	19	36	Ernie Irvan	MB2 Motorsports	Pontiac	1	0	crash	34	$44,525
Official race results

== Media ==
=== Television ===
The DirecTV 500 was covered by CBS in the United States for the fourth straight year and it was their final DirecTV 500 race as coverage would switch to Fox in 2001. Mike Joy, two-time NASCAR Cup Series champion Ned Jarrett and nineteen time NASCAR Cup Series race winner Buddy Baker called the race from the broadcast booth. Dick Berggren, Ralph Sheheen and Bill Stephens handled pit road for the television side. Ken Squier would serve as host.

CBS
Host	Booth announcers		Pit reporters
Host	Lap-by-lap	Color-commentators	Pit reporters
Ken Squier	Mike Joy	Ned Jarrett; Buddy Baker	Dick Berggren; Ralph Sheheen; Bill Stephens

Previous race: 1998 Food City 500	NASCAR Winston Cup Series; 1998 season	Next race: 1998 Goody's Headache Powder 500 (Martinsville)
