= Texas Motor Speedway =

Motorsport track in the United States

The Great American Speedway

- Quad-oval (1997–present)
- Location: 3545 Lone Star Circle, Fort Worth, Texas, United States
- Coordinates: 33°2′15″N 97°17′4.92″W
- Capacity: 75,000
- Owner: Fort Worth Sports Authority
- Operator: Speedway Motorsports (1996–present)
- Broke ground: 11 April 1995; 31 years ago
- Opened: 3 August 1996; 30 years ago
- Construction cost: US$110 million
- Former names: Texas International Raceway (September 1996–December 1996)
- Major events: Current: NASCAR Cup Series; Würth 400 (2005–present); O'Reilly Auto Parts 500 (1997–2020); NASCAR All-Star Race (2021–2022); NASCAR O'Reilly Auto Parts Series; Andy's Frozen Custard 340 (2005–present); SRS Distribution 250 (1997–2022); NASCAR Truck Series; SpeedyCash.com 250 (1999–present); Vankor 350 (1999–2020) Former: IndyCar Series; PPG 375 (1997–2023); American Le Mans Series; Grand Prix of Texas (2000–2001); SpeedVision World Challenge (2000–2001)
- Website: texasmotorspeedway.com

Oval (2017–present)
- Surface: Asphalt
- Length: 1.440 / 1.500 mi (2.317 / 2.414 km)
- Turns: 4
- Banking: Turns 1 and 2: 20° Turns 3 and 4: 24° Frontstretch and backstretch: 5°
- Race lap record: 0:23.0816 (Tony Kanaan, Dallara DW12, 2017, ICS)

Oval (1996–2016)
- Surface: Asphalt
- Length: 1.455 / 1.500 mi (2.342 / 2.414 km)
- Turns: 4
- Banking: Turns 1 and 2: 24° Turns 3 and 4: 24° Frontstretch and backstretch: 5°
- Race lap record: 0:22.972 ( (United States) Tony Stewart, Dallara IR-7, 1998, IRL)

Road Course with Chicane (2000–present)
- Surface: Asphalt
- Length: 2.324 mi (3.740 km)
- Turns: 10
- Race lap record: 1:12.912 ( (United Kingdom) Allan McNish, Audi R8, 2000, LMP900)

Texas Motor Speedway (formerly known as Texas International Raceway from September to December 1996) is a 1.5 mi (2.4 km) quad-oval intermediate speedway in Fort Worth, Texas, United States. It has hosted various major races since its inaugural season of racing in 1997, including NASCAR and IndyCar races. The track is owned by the city of Fort Worth's sports authority and is leased out by Speedway Motorsports, LLC (SMI) for racing, with Mark Faber serving as the track's general manager.

As of 2021, the track has a capacity of 75,000. Alongside the main track, Texas Motor Speedway features an infield road course with four layouts alongside two adjacent tracks, including a 0.200 mi (0.322 km) paved short track and a 0.400 mi (0.644 km) dirt track. TMS features numerous amenities, including the world's largest HD video screen, a Speedway Club overlooking the first turn, and a 10-story building dedicated for office space and condominiums.

Following the decline of the Texas World Speedway that began in the 1980s, the state of Texas found itself without a major racetrack and races for more than a decade. In the early 1990s, the newly incorporated and rising Speedway Motorsports and its founder, Bruton Smith, sought to build a major racetrack west of the Mississippi River, deciding on the Dallas–Fort Worth metroplex in 1994 with eventual longtime track general manager Eddie Gossage. Construction began in 1995 and was completed in 1996, with TMS holding its first races in 1997. Upon the track's christening, TMS became one of the biggest sports facilities in the United States. In recent years, TMS has come under criticism for a poor racing product, particularly for its NASCAR races.

== Description ==
=== Configurations ===
Texas Motor Speedway (TMS) in its current form is measured at 1.500 mi (2.414 km), with 20 degrees of banking in the speedway's first two turns, 24 degrees of banking in the speedway's last two turns, five degrees of banking on the track's frontstretch and backstretch, and a racing surface width of 80 feet. From 1998 to 2017, the turns were all banked at 24 degrees and the racing surface width was 58 feet. When the track was initially constructed, it had a dual-banking system, with a high bank of 24 degrees and a low bank of eight degrees in the turns. Disputes over the track's length exist; the IndyCar Series have at times utilized two lengths: one at 1.455 mi (2.342 km) for the pre-2017 layout and one at 1.440 mi (2.317 km) for the reconfigured layout with new turn 1/2 profile. However, these measurements have been disputed as an "error" by former longtime track general manager Eddie Gossage.

In 1999, track developers announced plans to build an infield road course that would utilize both the oval and the infield road course. The infield road course was completed in August 2000, and has four variations that are mainly used for sports car racing.

=== Amenities ===
TMS is served by numerous major roads. It is located at the intersection of Interstate 35W and Texas State Highway 114 to the track's southeast, and Farm to Market Road 156 to the track's west. The intersection has seen criticism since the track's construction; in 2010, Denton County officials announced the widening of Highway 114 in response to traffic within the area.

As of 2021, TMS has a reported capacity of 75,000 according to the Fort Worth Star-Telegram. TMS's track complex covers 1,500 acres according to the Star-Telegram. At the time of TMS's opening, the Fort Worth Star-Telegram reported in March 1997 that the track featured a capacity of 155,061 with a frontstretch grandstand capacity of 120,000, an infield capacity of 53,000, the world record for the amount of toilets at a facility with 2,450 toilets, 67,000 parking spaces for cars and RVs, 194 suites, and a 23-acre lake, with the entire complex of approximately 1,000 acres itself having more than 60 buildings.

==== Track complex buildings, Big Hoss TV ====
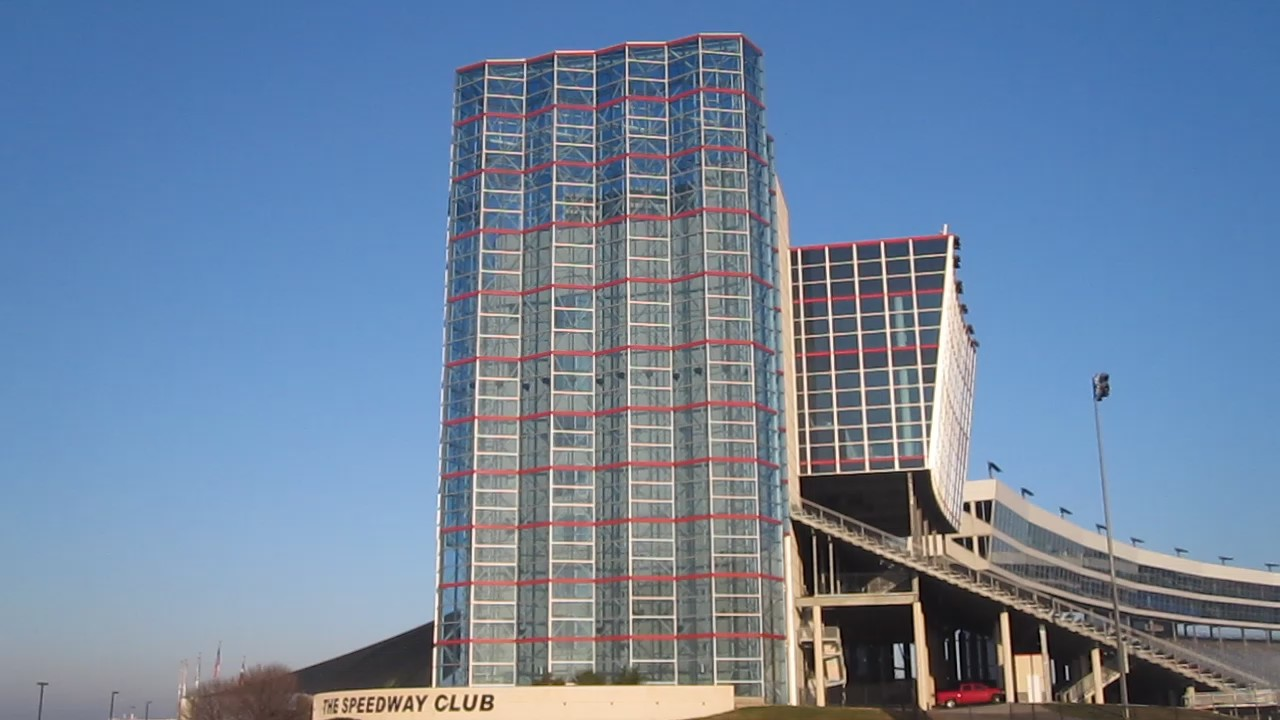
The Speedway Club at the speedway. The members-only club was inspired by the one at the Charlotte Motor Speedway, and opened in 1999.

Numerous buildings on the site's property serve for business purposes. A 10-story building named the Lone Star Tower overlooks the second turn and is used for condominiums and office space. The Lone Star Tower broke ground in 1996 and completed in early 1998, with the building costing Texas Motor Speedway around $25 million in taxes. The first four floors are dedicated for office space, with the rest of the floors being dedicated for condos. Initially, 58 condos were planned to be sold; the number later increased to 76. By the next year, the speedway made efforts to fill up the tower's office space of a combined 100,000 square feet. TMS also announced in 1997 that they were building a members-only Speedway Club overlooking the first turn that was inspired by the club at the Charlotte Motor Speedway. The nine-story club was completed in March 1999 at a cost of $35 million, featuring 26,000 square feet of space.

In 2013, Gossage announced the construction of Big Hoss TV, which when constructed, was set to become the biggest HD screen in the world. As a result of its construction, backstretch grandstands that numbered to around 10,000 seats were demolished. The video screen was completed in March 2014 and was officially certified by Guinness World Records as the largest HD television LED screen in the world. In 2023, TMS announced that the screen was to be expanded by 10%.

==== Adjacent tracks ====
TMS's complex has two adjacent tracks. In May 1998, the speedway opened Lil' Texas Motor Speedway, a 1/5 mile (0.32 km) paved short track that hosts various divisions of local short track racing, primarily legends cars and bandoleros. In August 1999, Gossage announced plans of a new 2/5 mile (0.64 km) dirt track to the main track's east that could seat 13,007. The $8 million track is made out of black gumbo soil, and held its first races in March 2000.

== History ==
=== Previous major tracks in Texas area ===
The first track to hold major series such as NASCAR and United States Auto Club (USAC)-sanctioned races in the state of Texas was the Texas International Speedway (later named Texas World Speedway), which opened in 1969, holding its first NASCAR race in December. The track was built like the Michigan International Speedway, but with higher banking for faster speeds. However, in the coming years, the track faced a slew of issues; the 1973 oil crisis halted any major racing for nearly three years. Although NASCAR eventually returned in 1979, heading into the 1980s, the track faced a lack of stable and modern infrastructure along with attendance issues. NASCAR left in 1981, with its president Bill France Jr. citing a poor track surface and amenities. USAC also left the track in the 1980s, although this was due to, according to track president R. C. Connole, USAC splitting with Championship Auto Racing Teams in 1979, leading to major turmoil within USAC. Although the track was swapped around numerous owners, the track never held a major series again, leaving Texas without a track that held a major series for over a decade.

=== Planning, construction, naming dispute ===
With the rising success of Speedway Motorsports, owned by businessman Bruton Smith, intended to build a major racetrack west of the Mississippi River with the rise of popularity in stock car racing. Smith employed the help of then Vice President of Public Relations at the Charlotte Motor Speedway, Eddie Gossage, to find a suitable location for the track. Three primary markets were decided on by Bruton: Las Vegas, the Dallas–Fort Worth metroplex, and St. Louis. In Las Vegas, the duo found out that local businessman Ralph Engelstad was scouting the same land as the duo; under the orders of Smith, the two stopped scouting Las Vegas to let Engelstad scout the land that later became the Las Vegas Motor Speedway. By November 18, 1994, the Fort Worth Star-Telegram reported that Smith and Gossage had made their final choices in either of the two remaining places. In St. Louis, the duo saw numerous pieces of land that were flooded, and scratched off St. Louis. In Dallas–Fort Worth, the duo met businessman Ross Perot Jr. and flew in Perot's helicopter to scout a piece of land that was owned by Perot. The land impressed the duo, and by November 30, the Star-Telegram reported that the two were planning to build a 150,000-capacity speedway at a cost of around $75,000,000 (adjusted for inflation, $162,915,357). Originally, the speedway was set to have a capacity of 70,000 seats. However, the capacity quickly grew in the initial planning stages; when Bruton requested that 5,000 seats be added, Gossage obliged. According to Gossage, "the next day he’d put in a change order for 5,000 more seats. And then a few days or a week later, he’d say, ‘Do you think you could sell 80 (thousand)?’ I’d say, ‘Oh, piece of cake.' And then one day I looked and we were at 155,000 seats and I told Bruton we’ve got to stop doing this."

Groundbreaking on TMS took place on April 11, 1995. Gossage was later asked to run the facility in late May, which he accepted. According to the duo, the track was inspired by previous tracks Smith owned, with Smith wanting to incorporate the best ideas from those tracks and combine them into the construction of TMS. The speedway initially implemented a dual-banked surface to accompany both NASCAR and open-wheel racing; a higher bank of 24 degrees meant to accommodate stock cars, and a lower bank of 8 degrees to accommodate open-wheel cars. In addition, for open-wheel races, a temporary wall was planned to be implemented each time an open-wheel series raced in order to reduce speeds. The plan met skepticism from open-wheel personalities such as Cary Agajanian and Jimmy Vasser over the feasibility of such a system. By June 1996, Agajanian reported that the speedway had ditched plans to make a temporary wall, instead deciding to paint a line where the change in banking was. On August 3, the track officially opened to the public for the first time, holding a charity "open-house" event. Eventual NASCAR races were announced in July 1996, and IndyCar races were announced the next month on August 7, with the IndyCar race to be run at night; an IndyCar first.

In August 1996, a quarter-mile dirt track based in Alvin, Texas, sued Smith's speedway over naming rights for the name "Texas Motor Speedway". Gossage and Bruton countersued on September 9, claiming that majority owner Jack Holland was trying to "squeeze and extort money" from them. As a result, the speedway changed its name to "Texas International Raceway" on September 11. Although litigation was expected to take years, on December 2, the dispute was settled out of court. With the settlement, the dirt track agreed to change its name, with the speedway able to retain the "Texas Motor Speedway" name.

=== Turbulent early years ===
TMS oversaw a turbulent period in its early years; particularly 1997, the track's first year of racing. In its first major race, the 1997 Interstate Batteries 500, heavy rain plagued the race's weekend, causing qualifying to be cancelled and the grass parking lots of the speedway to be heavily soaked. While the parking issue was resolved by using busses, further issues were raised when drivers started to complain about the surface of the race track, leading to a major first lap pileup. Two months later, the speedway held its first IndyCar Series race; a scoring dispute between Billy Boat and Arie Luyendyk occurred when Luyendyk disputed the victory that was initially given to Boat. As Boat and his team owner, A. J. Foyt were celebrating, Luyendyk went to victory lane to dispute the victory, demanding officials explain why he was scored as one lap short and demanding that he be given the victory. Foyt proceeded to slap Luyendyk on the back of the head and pushed him to the ground before being separated by security. Luyendyk was given the victory the next day after a scoring recheck.

After both races in 1997, Gossage announced that the speedway would reprofile the fourth turn. Complaints about the turn lasted into 1998, with drivers complaining about a new bump, along with water leakage issues. Further criticism was placed against the speedway and Gossage after a t-shirt was printed that stated "Shut Up and Race"; Gossage claims that NASCAR came up with the idea. Gossage announced a complete repave of the track, this time completely removing the dual-banking system.

In 1999, during the final practice session of the 1999 Mall.com 500, 11 people were injured in a crash on the track's pit road when Niclas Jönsson lost control of his car while trying to exit pit road, crashing into the parked car of Tyce Carlson while Carlson's crew was working with his car. The next year, during a NASCAR Truck Series race, the track oversaw its first fatality when driver Tony Roper crashed on the track's frontstretch, suffering a fatal basilar skull fracture that caused renewed controversy within NASCAR over driver safety. In 2001, the track sought to hold its first CART race; however, after a culmination of events that occurred over the course of several months, the race was cancelled after it was found that drivers could suffer extreme vertical g-loads in the track's turns that could have led to death. The track was later repaved that same year to remove any bumps from the racing surface, with Gossage stating in an interview that to maintain the track, they needed to repave it every couple of years.

==== Speedway's stabilization and expansion ====
By the early 2000s, problems with the track declined. TMS oversaw some of the biggest attended NASCAR races in history; races in 1999 and 2000 saw major success, with attendances of 221,861 and 223,000 people, respectively. In 2002, Francis Ferko, a minority shareholder in SMI, filed a lawsuit against NASCAR and the International Speedway Corporation for violating antitrust laws, feeling as if SMI did not do enough to protect his investment. A settlement was eventually reached in 2004, which guaranteed a second NASCAR race weekend for Texas at the cost of one of Rockingham Speedway's weekends. The settlement was enforced in 2005.

TMS became known for its promotions and stunts directed by Gossage. Gossage, who self-remarked himself as the last "old-school" promoters, conducted numerous promotions that were inspired by promoters such as Humpy Wheeler, who Gossage had formerly worked under at the Charlotte Motor Speedway. Under Gossage's tenure, TMS sparked numerous campaigns to promote the track, including training monkeys to sell souvenir programs, starting a victory lane tradition of each victor firing blank six-shooters in post-race celebrations, hiring an all-female pit crew to service a car, and allowing British motoring television show Top Gear and one of its hosts, Richard Hammond, to film a segment for the show. In 2010, Gossage directed the "No Limits" campaign, which was self-described as a "hot cars and hot chicks" that intended to target a younger and edgy audience.

=== Repave, mounting criticism and decline, retirement of Eddie Gossage ===
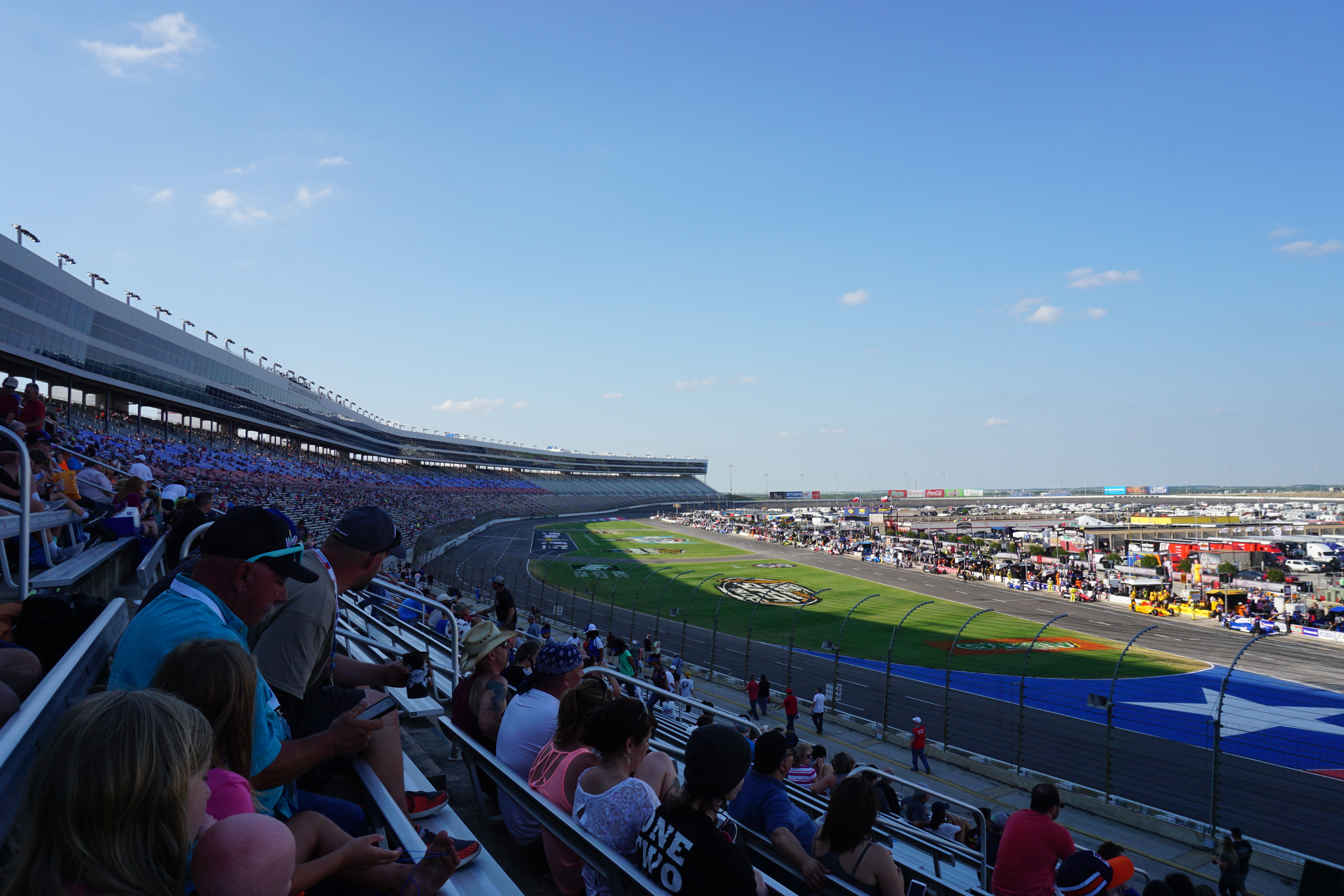
Texas Motor Speedway pictured in 2017.

By mid-2016, numerous complaints against the track's surface taking too long to dry were made. By November, during a rain delay at the 2016 AAA Texas 500 which took seven hours to restart, complaints rose again. Despite this, Gossage stated that he had no plans to repave the track in the short-term, sharing the opinions of drivers Jimmie Johnson and Carl Edwards. However, under the direction of SMI CEO Marcus Smith, the track announced the commencement of a repave in response to the drying issues. With the repave, the banking in the first two turns were decreased from 24 to 20 degrees, and the racing surface was expanded from 60 to 80 feet. In a 2017 Dallas Morning News article, the repave was viewed neutrally by IndyCar drivers, and NASCAR drivers were recorded to be more optimistic about the repave.

Throughout the late 2010s, TMS oversaw continuous decline. In November 2019, Gossage made calls to "modernize" the speedway, including decreasing capacity from 135,000 to a range from 80,000 to 90,000, along with better internet services, a wider concession variety, and more suites. In 2020, as an attempt by Marcus to increase attendance at the speedway, he moved the NASCAR All-Star Race from its traditional home at the Charlotte Motor Speedway to Texas, a move that saw criticism in the coming years.

By 2020, Gossage was in talks with Marcus on retiring from his position, stating that he had grown upset at the IndyCar racing product on the newly-reconfigured track and consequences from the COVID-19 pandemic. By December, he confirmed his decision to retire to Marcus, officially announcing his retirement in a press conference on May 13, 2021, with his retirement effective after the 2021 NASCAR All-Star Race that was set to take place on June 13.

==== Rob Ramage and Mark Faber ====
After Gossage's retirement, TMS leaders announced that they would reduce capacity down to 75,000 and renovate the suites at the track. On August 4, 2021, Marcus Smith announced that Rob Ramage, a Texas Motor Speedway executive and counselor, had been promoted to replace Gossage as general manager. In an interview with D Magazine, Ramage pledged that the speedway would place a bigger emphasis on technology, including releasing NFTs and experimenting with augmented reality. He also expressed a desire to increase fan diversity, specifically with Hispanics. In September, NASCAR announced that the NASCAR All-Star Race was set to return to the speedway in 2022.

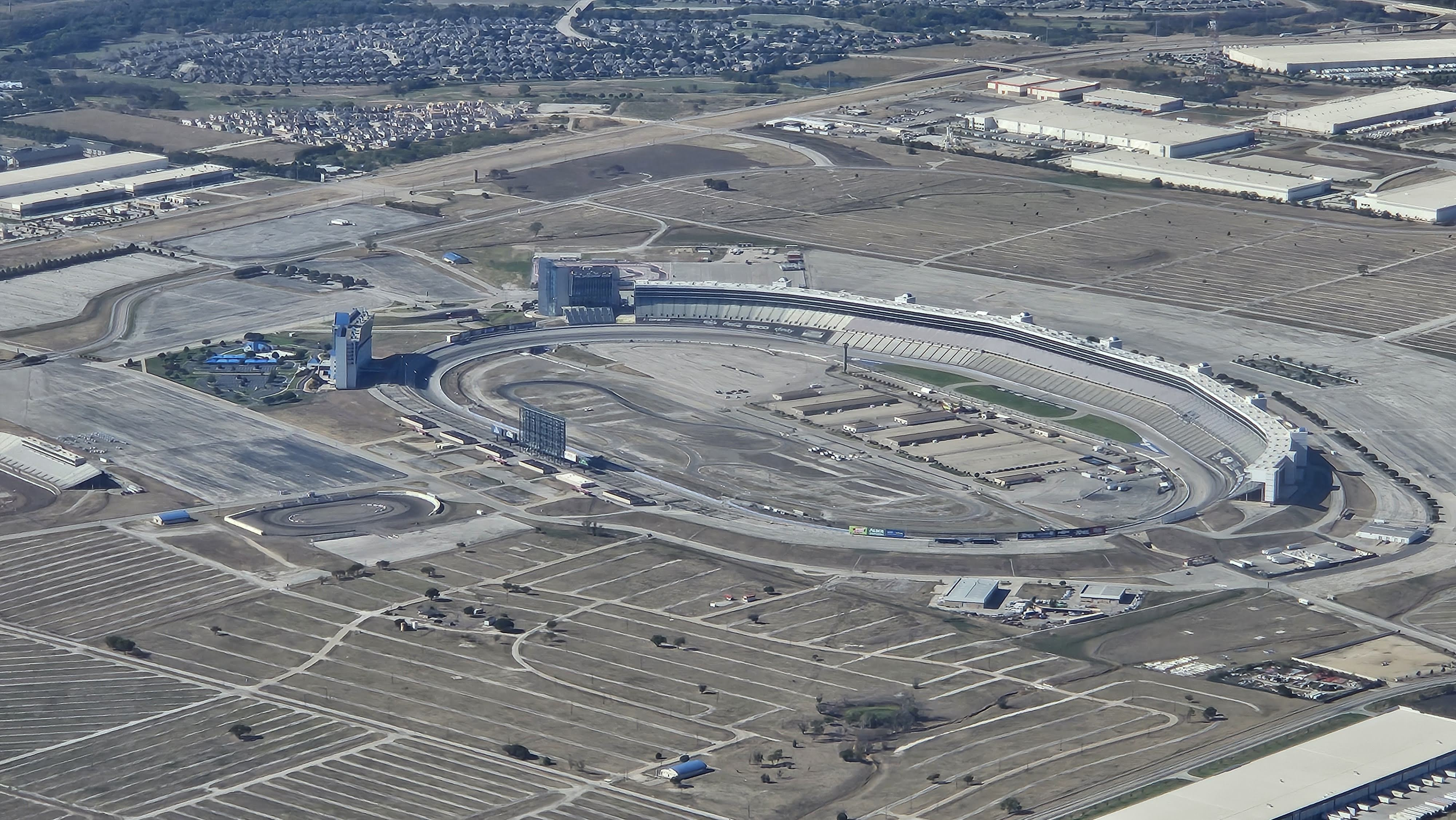
The Texas Motor Speedway in October 2023.

In 2022, the track oversaw controversies in both of its NASCAR races along with general criticism for a poor racing product, leading calls from drivers to completely renovate the track. In August, Ramage was removed as general manager after only one year, having been promoted to becoming SMI's vice president of government relations and deputy counsel. SMI replaced Ramage with Mark Faber, who previously worked in Las Vegas as the T-Mobile Arena's senior vice president of global partnerships. Under the leadership of Faber, Faber promised for better relations with the city of Fort Worth, with Faber claiming that a "pain point" was Gossage putting "No Limits, Texas" on the outside wall instead of the actual city's name. Faber also announced the creation of the "No Limits Next" project, aimed at renovating the track and expanding Big Hoss TV. The speedway also ended the tradition of victors firing six-shooters in victory lane under Faber's leadership. By July 2023, Faber also confirmed that the speedway and Marcus Smith were looking at repaving the track by using iRacing simulations.

== Events ==
=== Racing events ===
==== NASCAR ====
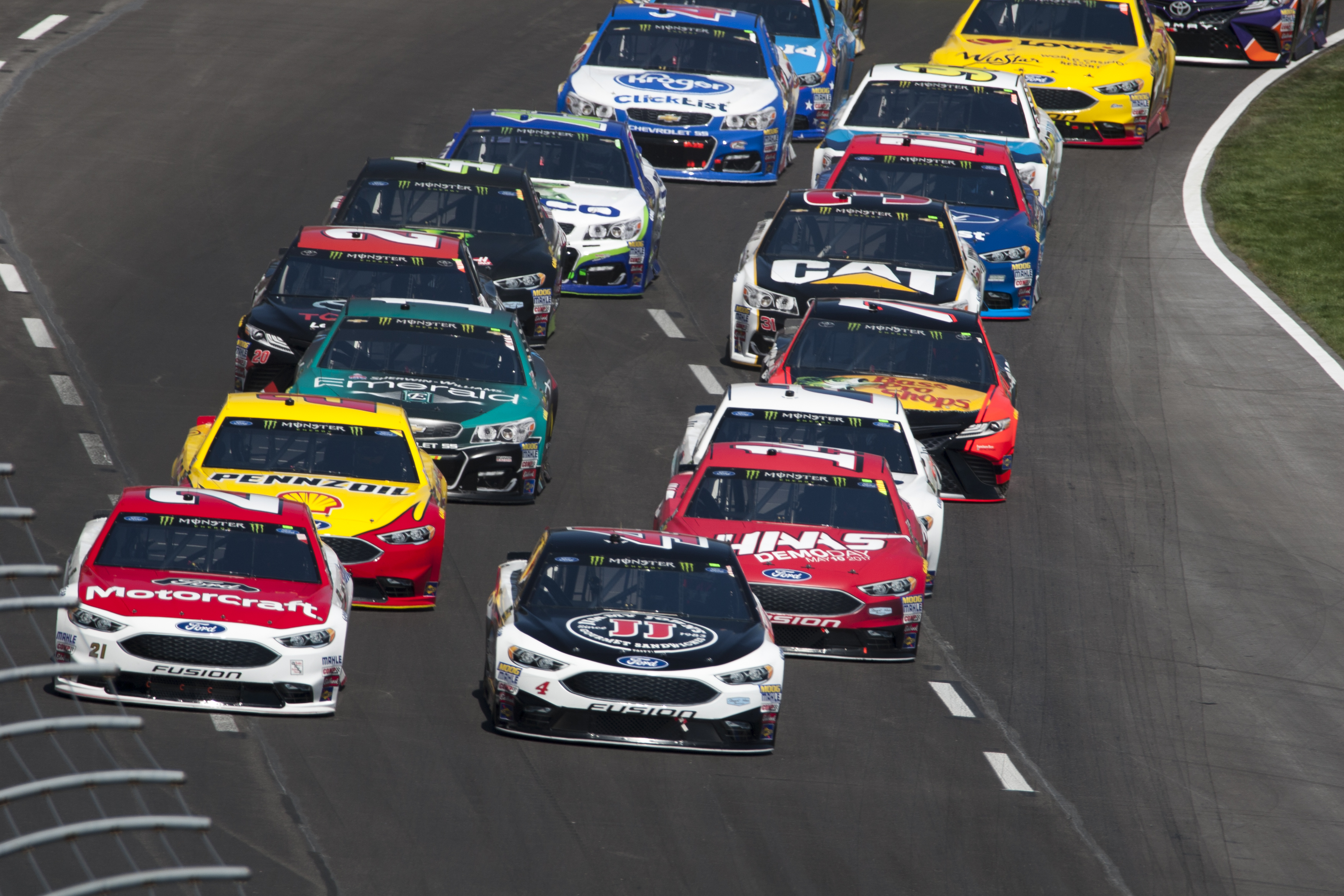
The NASCAR Cup Series racing at TMS in 2017. Since 1997, the facility has hosted the series annually in some fashion.

TMS holds one annual NASCAR weekend, highlighted by a NASCAR Cup Series race known as the Würth 400. The track also features support races for the Cup Series, including the NASCAR O'Reilly Auto Parts Series' Andy's Frozen Custard 340 and the NASCAR Truck Series' SpeedyCash.com 250. In 2021, as well as 2022, the track held an exhibition race, the All-Star Race as part of SMI CEO Marcus Smith's effort to boost declining attendance. However, after two years, the All-Star Race moved to North Wilkesboro Speedway.

==== Open-wheel racing ====
TMS formerly held IndyCar Series races from 1997 to 2023. In 2024, the IndyCar Series did not return to TMS due to an NBC conflict with the 2024 Summer Olympics.

In 2000, a CART race was planned for 2001 but was canceled after it was found that drivers could suffer extreme vertical g-loads that could have led to death. The speedway later sued CART for breach of contract and settled for approximately $5–7 million, and races scheduled for 2002 and 2003 were canceled.

==== Other racing events ====
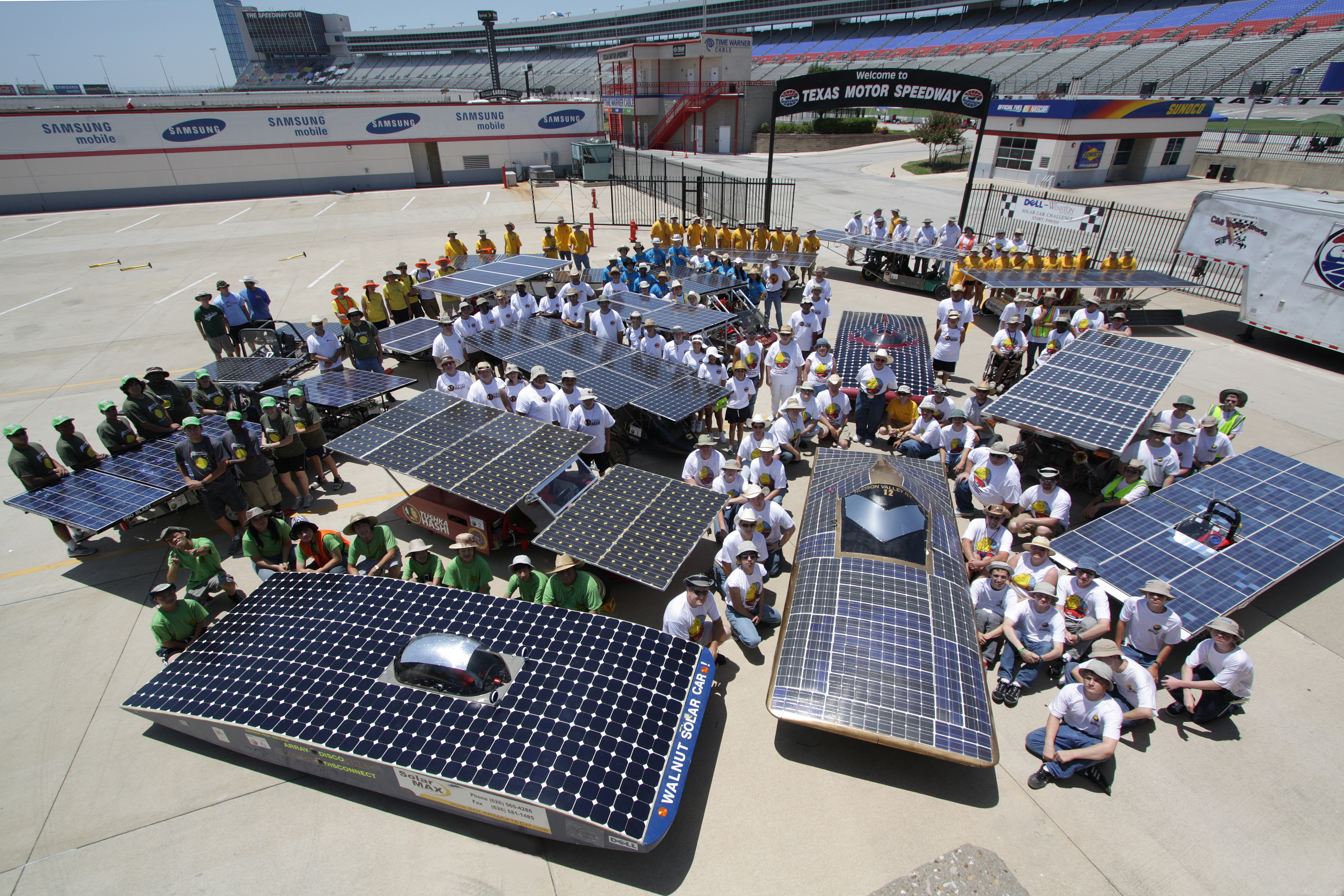
Competitors and their cars at the 2009 Solar Car Challenge.

- Since 1998, TMS has held the Solar Car Challenge, a solar-powered car race for high school students. In odd-numbered years, the track is used as a starting point for a cross-country route. In even-numbered years, the track is used as a showcase location.
- In 2000, the American Le Mans Series expanded their schedule to include TMS to run the Grand Prix of Texas, deciding to run a "roval" version of the track that utilized parts of the newly-constructed infield road course and the oval. The series ran the event again in 2001.
- In 2015, TMS held the seventh round of the 2015 Red Bull Air Race World Championship through the weekend of September 26–27. The track once again hosted the series in 2018, this time as the season finale of that year.
- In 2017, TMS hosted a Stadium Super Trucks event as a support event for the June weekend's NASCAR Camping World Truck Series and IndyCar Series doubleheader. The series raced at the speedway annually until 2019.
- In 2022, the track hosted the Indy Autonomous Challenge.
- In 2024, the track hosted the second round of the 2024 SuperMotocross World Championship.

=== Festivals ===
The speedway has held numerous festivals throughout its history, with some festivals having a recorded attendance of 250,000 people or more. In 1997, days after the track's IRL race, the speedway held a two-day country music festival titled Country Fest, attracting 260,000 people. A week later, the speedway held RockFest '97, a rock music festival that attracted around 400,000 people. The latter was described by then-general manager Eddie Gossage as "the worst day of my life", who stated that the festival was extremely chaotic.

After 1997, TMS has held fewer festivals. In 2010, the track hosted FortyFest, a Christian rock music festival. In 2023, the track hosted a second location of the HWY30 Music Fest, a country music festival that originated from Filer, Idaho. The track is scheduled to host the event again in 2024.

=== Other events ===
- In 2020, during the COVID-19 pandemic, the facility held 23 high school graduation ceremonies for schools within Denton County, Texas. In September 2022, the track became a shelter for victims of Hurricane Ida.

== Lap records ==
As of November 2018, the fastest official race lap records at Texas Motor Speedway are listed as:

Category	Time	Driver	Vehicle	Event
Oval (1996–present): 1.500 mi (2.414 km)
IRL	0:22.972	Tony Stewart	Dallara IR-7	1998 True Value 500
Indy Lights	0:27.3273	P. J. Chesson	Dallara IPS	2004 Texas 100
NASCAR Cup	0:27.617	Kevin Harvick	Ford Fusion	2018 O'Reilly Auto Parts 500
NASCAR Xfinity	0:28.342	Ryan Blaney	Ford Mustang	2018 My Bariatric Solutions 300
NASCAR Truck	0:28.913	Brett Moffitt	Toyota Tundra	2018 JAG Metals 350
Road Course (2000–present): 2.324 mi (3.740 km)
LMP900	1:12.924	Allan McNish	Audi R8	2000 Grand Prix of Texas
GT1 (GTS)	1:20.108	Olivier Beretta	Dodge Viper GTS-R	2000 Grand Prix of Texas
GT	1:23.879	Sascha Maassen	Porsche 911 (996) GT3-R	2000 Grand Prix of Texas
LMP675	1:26.134	Steven Knight	Lola B2K/40	2001 Grand Prix of Texas
