= NASCAR Cup Series at Texas Motor Speedway =

NASCAR Cup Series race held at Texas Motor Speedway

NASCAR Cup Series
- Venue: Texas Motor Speedway
- Location: Fort Worth, Texas, United States

Circuit information
- Surface: Asphalt
- Length: 1.5 mi (2.4 km)
- Turns: 4

Stock car races in the NASCAR Cup Series have been held at the Texas Motor Speedway in Fort Worth, Texas since 1997. The race's trophy is in the shape of a cowboy hat on top of a piston. Traditionally, the winning driver wears a black cowboy hat and fires a couple of six-shooters in the air on victory lane.

== Current race ==
Würth 400

NASCAR Cup Series
- Corporate sponsor: Würth
- First race: 2005 (current)
- Distance: 400 mi (643.738 km)
- Laps: 267; Stage 1: 80; Stage 2: 85; Final stage: 102
- Previous names: Dickies 500 (2005–2009); AAA Texas 500 (2010–2019); Autotrader EchoPark Automotive 500 (2020–2022); Autotrader EchoPark Automotive 400 (2023–2024)
- Most wins (driver): Jimmie Johnson (5)
- Most wins (team): Hendrick Motorsports (9)
- Most wins (manufacturer): Chevrolet (12)

The 400-mile (640 km) event, currently known as Würth 400 for sponsorship reasons, began as a result of the Ferko lawsuit. Ferko, a stakeholder in track owner Speedway Motorsports, Inc., filed the suit in 2002 claiming that NASCAR had not honored an implied contract that would have given Texas a second Cup race at the track. The lawsuit was settled in 2004, awarding the track a second race beginning in 2005 at the expense of Darlington Raceway, which lost its second race; that particular event happened to be the Southern 500, which NASCAR had already moved from its traditional Labor Day weekend spot in favor of awarding a second race to California Speedway. The second Texas race would be run in the fall, and comprise part of the NASCAR Playoffs.

The track scaled down to just one race starting from the 2021 season, dropping the former spring race in favor of hosting the NASCAR All-Star Race and the addition of Circuit of the Americas in Austin to the schedule. In 2024, the race was moved to the former spring slot.

=== Past winners ===
Year	Date	No.	Driver	Team	Manufacturer	Race distance		Race time	Average speed (mph)	Report	Ref
Year	Date	No.	Driver	Team	Manufacturer	Laps	Miles (km)	Race time	Average speed (mph)	Report	Ref
2005	November 6	99	Carl Edwards	Roush Racing	Ford	334	501 (806.281)	3:19:00	151.055	Report	
2006	November 5	20	Tony Stewart	Joe Gibbs Racing	Chevrolet	339*	508.5 (818.351)	3:46:11	134.891	Report	
2007	November 4	48	Jimmie Johnson	Hendrick Motorsports	Chevrolet	334	501 (806.281)	3:49:05	131.219	Report	
2008	November 2	99	Carl Edwards	Roush Fenway Racing	Ford	334	501 (806.281)	3:28:26	144.219	Report	
2009	November 8	2	Kurt Busch	Penske Racing	Dodge	334	501 (806.281)	3:24:18	147.137	Report	
2010	November 7	11	Denny Hamlin	Joe Gibbs Racing	Toyota	334	501 (806.281)	3:34:01	140.456	Report	
2011	November 6	14	Tony Stewart	Stewart–Haas Racing	Chevrolet	334	501 (806.281)	3:16:51	152.705	Report	
2012	November 4	48	Jimmie Johnson	Hendrick Motorsports	Chevrolet	335*	502.5 (808.695)	3:41:30	136.117	Report	
2013	November 3	48	Jimmie Johnson	Hendrick Motorsports	Chevrolet	334	501 (806.281)	3:18:05	151.754	Report	
2014	November 2	48	Jimmie Johnson	Hendrick Motorsports	Chevrolet	341*	511.5 (823.179)	3:52:05	132.239	Report	
2015	November 8	48	Jimmie Johnson	Hendrick Motorsports	Chevrolet	334	501 (806.281)	3:38:38	137.49	Report	
2016	November 6	19	Carl Edwards	Joe Gibbs Racing	Toyota	293*	439.5 (707.306)	3:16:00	134.541	Report	
2017	November 5	4	Kevin Harvick	Stewart–Haas Racing	Ford	334	501 (806.281)	3:29:52	143.234	Report	
2018	November 4	4	Kevin Harvick	Stewart–Haas Racing	Ford	337*	505.5 (813.523)	3:21:27	150.558	Report	
2019	November 3	4	Kevin Harvick	Stewart–Haas Racing	Ford	334	501 (806.281)	3:44:44	133.759	Report	
2020	October 25 & 28*	18	Kyle Busch	Joe Gibbs Racing	Toyota	334	501 (806.281)	3:42:14	135.263	Report	
2021	October 17	5	Kyle Larson	Hendrick Motorsports	Chevrolet	334	501 (806.281)	3:42:54	134.859	Report	
2022	September 25	8	Tyler Reddick	Richard Childress Racing	Chevrolet	334	501 (806.281)	4:21:53	114.784	Report	
2023	September 24	24	William Byron	Hendrick Motorsports	Chevrolet	267	400.5 (644.541)	3:14:28	123.569	Report	
2024	April 14	9	Chase Elliott	Hendrick Motorsports	Chevrolet	276*	414 (666.267)	3:33:14	116.492	Report	
2025	May 4	22	Joey Logano	Team Penske	Ford	271*	406.5 (654.197)	3:28:40	116.885	Report	
2026	May 3	9	Chase Elliott	Hendrick Motorsports	Chevrolet	267	400.5 (644.541)	2:56:17	136.315	Report	
2027	May 2									Report	

- 2006, 2012, 2014, 2018, 2024, and 2025: Race extended due to a NASCAR Overtime finish. 2014 took two attempts.
- 2016: Race shortened due to rain.
- 2020: Race started on Sunday, was suspended multiple times due to rain and persistent moisture, and finished on Wednesday.

=== Multiple winners (drivers) ===
# Wins	Driver	Years won
5	Jimmie Johnson	2007, 2012–2015
3	Carl Edwards	2005, 2008, 2016
3	Kevin Harvick	2017–2019
2	Tony Stewart	2006, 2011
2	Chase Elliott	2024, 2026

=== Multiple winners (teams) ===
# Wins	Team	Years won
9	Hendrick Motorsports	2007, 2012–2015, 2021, 2023–2024, 2026
4	Stewart–Haas Racing	2011, 2017–2019
4	Joe Gibbs Racing	2006, 2010, 2016, 2020
2	Roush Fenway Racing	2005, 2008
2	Team Penske	2009, 2025

=== Manufacturer wins ===
# Wins	Manufacturer	Years won
12	Chevrolet	2006–2007, 2011–2015, 2021–2024, 2026
6	Ford	2005, 2008, 2017–2019, 2025
3	Toyota	2010, 2016, 2020
1	Dodge	2009

== Former second race ==
O'Reilly Auto Parts 500
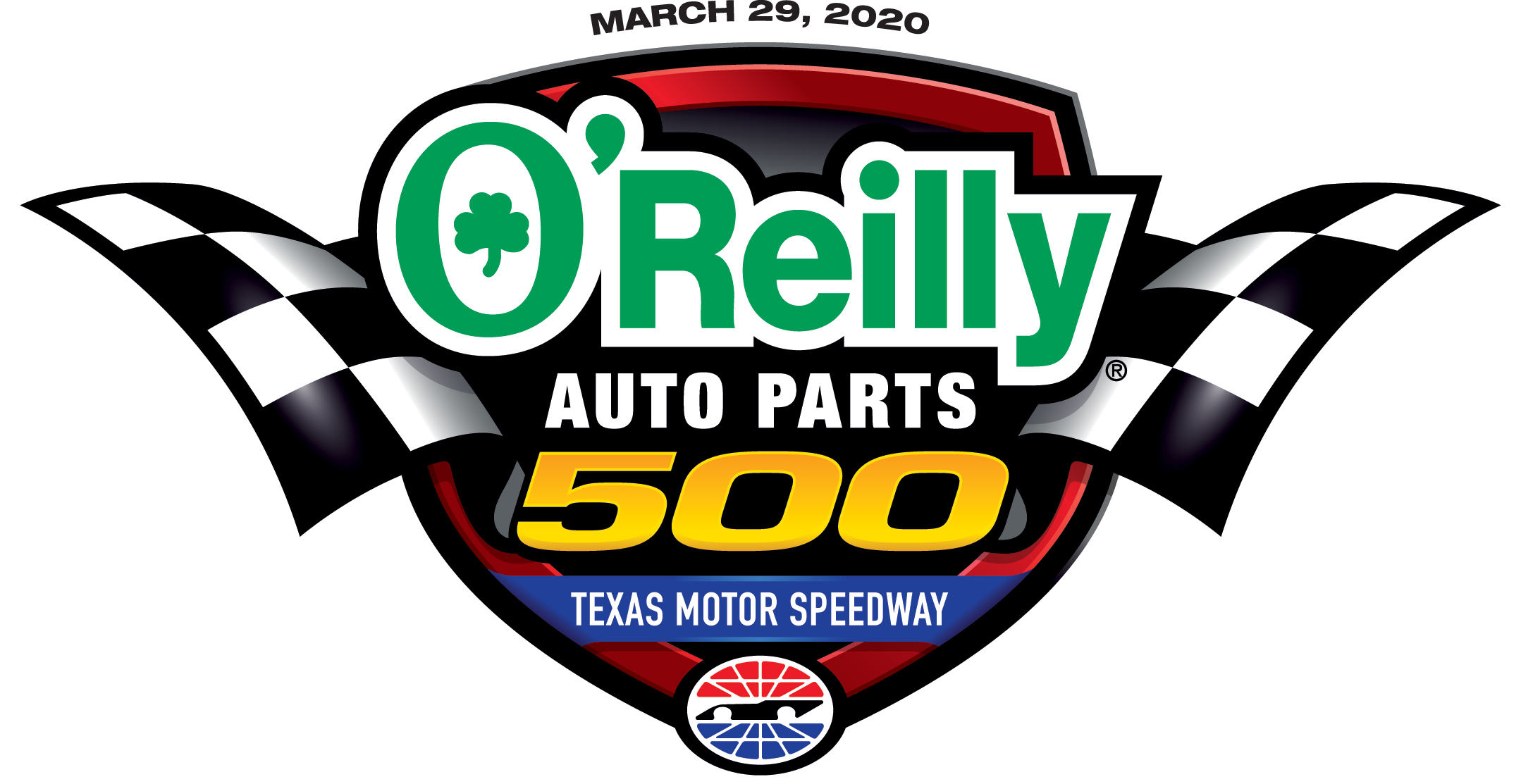

NASCAR Cup Series
- First race: 1997
- Last race: 2020
- Distance: 400 mi (643.738 km)
- Laps: 267; Stage 1: 80; Stage 2: 85; Final stage: 102
- Previous names: Interstate Batteries 500 (1997); Texas 500 (1998); Primestar 500 (1999); DirecTV 500 (2000); Harrah's 500 (2001); Samsung / RadioShack 500 (2002–2006); Samsung 500 (2007–2009); Samsung Mobile 500 (2010–2012); NRA 500 (2013); Duck Commander 500 (2014–2016); O'Reilly Auto Parts 500 (2017-2020)
- Most wins (driver): Kyle Busch (3)
- Most wins (team): Roush Fenway Racing (7)
- Most wins (manufacturer): Ford (10)

=== History ===
The track's original race, held in spring, was held from 1997 to 2020. The first two runnings of the race were controversial, crash-strewn affairs, with universal criticism that the track's design was one groove; Kenny Wallace argued, "They're so busy building condos they don't have time to fix the racetrack." Traditionalist fans also criticized the replacement of North Wilkesboro Speedway with the Texas in the schedule.

=== Previous winners ===
Year	Date	No.	Driver	Team	Manufacturer	Race distance		Race time	Average speed (mph)	Report	Ref
Year	Date	No.	Driver	Team	Manufacturer	Laps	Miles (km)	Race time	Average speed (mph)	Report	Ref
1997	April 6	99	Jeff Burton	Roush Racing	Ford	334	501 (806.281)	4:00:16	125.111	Report	
1998	April 5	6	Mark Martin	Roush Racing	Ford	334	501 (806.281)	3:39:47	136.771	Report	
1999	March 28	5	Terry Labonte	Hendrick Motorsports	Chevrolet	334	501 (806.281)	3:28:21	144.276	Report	
2000	April 2	8	Dale Earnhardt Jr.	Dale Earnhardt, Inc.	Chevrolet	334	501 (806.281)	3:49:12	131.152	Report	
2001	April 1	88	Dale Jarrett	Robert Yates Racing	Ford	334	501 (806.281)	3:31:59	141.804	Report	
2002	April 8*	17	Matt Kenseth	Roush Racing	Ford	334	501 (806.281)	3:31:01	142.453	Report	
2003	March 30	12	Ryan Newman	Penske Racing	Dodge	334	501 (806.281)	3:43:28	134.517	Report	
2004	April 4	38	Elliott Sadler	Robert Yates Racing	Ford	334	501 (806.281)	3:36:30	138.845	Report	
2005	April 17	16	Greg Biffle	Roush Racing	Ford	334	501 (806.281)	3:51:08	130.055	Report	
2006	April 9	9	Kasey Kahne	Evernham Motorsports	Dodge	334	501 (806.281)	3:37:55	137.943	Report	
2007	April 15	31	Jeff Burton	Richard Childress Racing	Chevrolet	334	501 (806.281)	3:39:41	143.359	Report	
2008	April 6	99	Carl Edwards	Roush Fenway Racing	Ford	339*	508.5 (818.351)	3:30:41	144.814	Report	
2009	April 5	24	Jeff Gordon	Hendrick Motorsports	Chevrolet	334	501 (806.281)	3:25:22	146.372	Report	
2010	April 19*	11	Denny Hamlin	Joe Gibbs Racing	Toyota	334	501 (806.281)	3:25:34	146.23	Report	
2011*	April 9	17	Matt Kenseth	Roush Fenway Racing	Ford	334	501 (806.281)	3:21:26	149.231	Report	
2012	April 14	16	Greg Biffle	Roush Fenway Racing	Ford	334	501 (806.281)	3:07:12	160.577	Report	
2013	April 13	18	Kyle Busch	Joe Gibbs Racing	Toyota	334	501 (806.281)	3:27:40	144.751	Report	
2014	April 7*	22	Joey Logano	Team Penske	Ford	340*	510 (820.765)	3:39:02	134.191	Report	
2015	April 11	48	Jimmie Johnson	Hendrick Motorsports	Chevrolet	334	501 (806.281)	3:33:57	140.5	Report	
2016	April 9–10*	18	Kyle Busch	Joe Gibbs Racing	Toyota	334	501 (806.281)	3:37:16	138.355	Report	
2017	April 9	48	Jimmie Johnson	Hendrick Motorsports	Chevrolet	334	501 (806.281)	3:24:18	147.137	Report	
2018	April 8	18	Kyle Busch	Joe Gibbs Racing	Toyota	334	501 (806.281)	3:32:07	141.714	Report	
2019	March 31	11	Denny Hamlin	Joe Gibbs Racing	Toyota	334	501 (806.281)	3:16:11	153.224	Report	
2020	July 19	3	Austin Dillon	Richard Childress Racing	Chevrolet	334	501 (806.281)	3:38:57	137.292	Report	

=== Notes ===
- 2002, 2010, & 2014: Race moved from Sunday afternoon to Monday afternoon due to rain.
- 2008 and 2014: Race extended due to a NASCAR Overtime finish
- 2011: First scheduled night event in NASCAR Cup Series history at Texas Motor Speedway.
- 2016: The race was delayed by rain for 2 hours. Race was completed early Sunday morning at 2:45 am CT.
- 2020: Race postponed from March 29 to July 19 due to the COVID-19 pandemic.

=== Multiple winners (drivers) ===
# Wins	Driver	Years won
3	Kyle Busch	2013, 2016, 2018
2	Jeff Burton	1997, 2007
2	Matt Kenseth	2002, 2011
2	Greg Biffle	2005, 2012
2	Jimmie Johnson	2015, 2017
2	Denny Hamlin	2010, 2019

=== Multiple winners (teams) ===
# Wins	Team	Years won
7	Roush Fenway Racing	1997, 1998, 2002, 2005, 2008, 2011, 2012
5	Joe Gibbs Racing	2010, 2013, 2016, 2018, 2019
4	Hendrick Motorsports	1999, 2009, 2015, 2017
2	Robert Yates Racing	2001, 2004
2	Team Penske	2003, 2014
2	Richard Childress Racing	2007, 2020

=== Manufacturer wins ===
# Wins	Manufacturer	Years won
10	Ford	1997, 1998, 2001, 2002, 2004, 2005, 2008, 2011, 2012, 2014
7	Chevrolet	1999, 2000, 2007, 2009, 2015, 2017, 2020
5	Toyota	2010, 2013, 2016, 2018, 2019
2	Dodge	2003, 2006

== Notable races ==
- 2005: The inaugural Fall race saw Carl Edwards dominate the second half of the race. With 15 laps to go, the caution came out for debris. Most of the leaders stayed out, but Edwards took two right-sides to restart 6th with 11 laps to go. Edwards charged through traffic to deny Mark Martin (who stayed out) from becoming the first repeat winner in Texas Motor Speedway history by passing him on the penultimate lap. Edwards became the 10th different winner in 10 races.
- 2009: Kyle and Kurt Busch dominated the race as the brothers swapped the lead at different points in the race leading a combined 321 of 334 laps. Coming down to fuel mileage, Kyle had led 232 laps and was on his way to a dominant win until he ran out with less than 3 to go. Brother Kurt led 89 laps and was able to stretch his gas tank to win the event by over 25 seconds as others were running out of gas. Aside from the Busch brothers, only Denny Hamlin (2 laps led) and Jeff Gordon (11 laps led) led laps.
- 2010: Denny Hamlin became the second driver to sweep both races at Texas when he won the Samsung Mobile 500 in spring and the AAA Texas 500 in fall. Also, around mid-race, a shoving match occurred when Jeff Burton and Jeff Gordon crashed in turn 2.
- 2011: Tony Stewart's surge towards the 2011 Cup championship continued between him and Carl Edwards, a theme through the 2011 Cup Playoffs. Stewart dominated and won his fourth race in eight starts since he went winless during the regular season, with Edwards finishing 2nd. Eddie Gossage, the track's president awarded Stewart with a robe and a pair of boxing gloves to continue the Stewart-Edwards battle. It was Tony's second win at Texas, having won 5 years prior.
- 2012: The first 100 laps of the race went green, combine that with the last 234 laps of the April 2012 race that went green, means a total of 334 consecutive laps were run caution-free, a full scheduled race at Texas. Jimmie Johnson won, for his 60th NASCAR Cup Series win, and also Chevrolet's 700th win.
- 2014: Johnson took his third straight win in the fall race, leading 191 of 341 laps. On a green-white-checkered restart, Brad Keselowski tried to go three-wide and made contact with Jeff Gordon, cutting Gordon's left rear tire and causing him to spin in turn 4. Gordon lost a lap and finished 29th while Keselowski finished third. Tempers boiled over, escalating into a post-race brawl on pit road between Keselowski, Gordon, and their pit crews that were apparently instigated by Kevin Harvick.
- 2015: In the 2015 running, Jimmie Johnson grabbed his fourth straight win in the fall race and became the third driver in the track's history to sweep both races at Texas, as well as winning his third consecutive event at the track. Brad Keselowski led 312 of 334 laps (a track record). Dale Earnhardt Jr. tagged the wall with his right-rear corner. This affected the handling of his car and he began to fall back through the field. He spun in the turn 3 apron on lap 167, Kevin Harvick made an unscheduled stop with 53 laps to go for a flat right-rear tire. He fell to 20th–place in the running order and down a lap. Carl Edwards kicked off the final cycle of pit stops with 38 laps to go. Keselowski hit pit road with 37 laps to go and the lead cycled to Harvick. Denny Hamlin was tagged for speeding on pit road and was forced to serve a drive-through penalty. On 16-lap older tires, he was no match for Keselowski as he was passed with ease with 35 laps to go. Keselowski was leading in the closing laps, a few circuits away from locking a spot in the Championship 4 at Homestead. His dominant performance did not end with the win as Johnson got around Brad with 4 laps to go, settling for 2nd. The next week, Keselowski had no luck and failed to advance to the Championship 4.
- 2016: Originally scheduled to be broadcast on NBC, the 2016 running was moved to NBCSN due to inclement weather, Carl Edwards grabbed the win after the race was called for inclement weather after 293 laps. It would turn out to be Edward's final Cup win before abruptly announcing his retirement after the 2016 season. As of 2020, this is the only Cup race at Texas that has failed to go the scheduled distance.
- 2018: Harvick won the race in dominating fashion, but he along with Ryan Blaney who finished second, and Erik Jones who finished fourth all failed post-race tech. Kevin's win would be encumbered and would have to sweat out to point his way to the Championship 4. The scenario would later fuel the fans' desire to see a winning car that fails tech be disqualified and stripped of the win. In 2019, NASCAR came up with the rule that has been used since. As soon as the winning car is wheeled out of victory circle, it undergoes post-race tech that takes 90–120 minutes immediately, and the results of if it passed or failed are confirmed that day, knowing who the winner is instead of a few days later. Had the rule been in effect at the time, third-place finisher Joey Logano would have won the race.
- 2020: The race was red-flagged on Sunday on lap 52 due to rain and mist and would be subject to the longest red-flag in NASCAR's history, first being postponed to the following Monday morning, then again to Tuesday afternoon due to the same inclement weather, then again a third time to Wednesday afternoon as a result of the mist, a total of nearly 72 hours. Rather ironically, the two most prominent drivers retiring at the end of the year, Clint Bowyer and Jimmie Johnson, were scored 1st and 2nd, respectively, at the time of the red flag. After the race resumed, Kyle Busch held off Martin Truex Jr. to claim his first Cup Series win of the 2020 season, keeping a 16-year winning streak alive (since 2005 when he became a full-time driver). It snapped a 33-race winless skid, with his last being at Homestead in November 2019 when he won the race and championship. Kyle also tied Carl Edwards for second-most wins at Texas with his 4th.
- 2022: The race was marred with controversy, with a record of 16 cautions throughout the race. Most of them were for tire failures in turn 4. Cody Ware would crash head-on into the turn 4 wall on lap 168, then careened down pit road almost hitting the pit road opening to the garage at high speed. Kevin Harvick, Martin Truex Jr., and Chase Elliott would all suffer tire blowouts while leading that took them out of contention, while playoff drivers Alex Bowman and Christopher Bell would crash from tire failures (Bowman would later be revealed to have suffered from concussion-like symptoms from the crash that sat him out of the next race). During a caution period for Truex's incident, William Byron shoved Denny Hamlin on the tri-oval from 2nd spinning Hamlin out in retaliation from Hamlin running Byron into the turn 2 wall earlier in the race. NASCAR officials missed the replay of the incident and instead sent Hamlin to 15th for not maintaining position under caution while Byron was fined $50,000 and docked 25 driver and owner points two days after the race. Ty Gibbs was also fined $75,000 and docked 25 owner points (as he is competing for the Xfinity points, he could not receive or lose Cup points) for contact with Ty Dillon on the pit road, the second time in a year for Gibbs. Tyler Reddick would go on to win the race for his 3rd win with Richard Childress Racing and becoming the 4th non-playoff driver in a row to win a race, after being eliminated from the Round of 16 by 2 points.

Previous race: Jack Link's 500	NASCAR Cup Series; Würth 400	Next race: AdventHealth 400
