= 2000 Grand Prix of Texas =

Texas Motor Speedway

The 2000 Grand Prix of Texas was the seventh round of the 2000 American Le Mans Series season. It took place at Texas Motor Speedway, Texas, on September 2, 2000.

== Race results ==
Class winners in bold.

Pos	Class	No	Team	Drivers	Chassis	Tyre	Laps
Pos	Class	No	Team	Drivers	Engine	Tyre	Laps
1	**LMP**	**78**	**(Germany) Audi Sport North America**	**(Germany) Frank Biela (Italy) Emanuele Pirro**	**Audi R8**	MI	**127**
1	**LMP**	**78**	**(Germany) Audi Sport North America**	**(Germany) Frank Biela (Italy) Emanuele Pirro**	**Audi 3.6 L Turbo V8**	MI	**127**
2	LMP	77	(Germany) Audi Sport North America	(Italy) Rinaldo Capello (United Kingdom) Allan McNish	Audi R8	MI	127
2	LMP	77	(Germany) Audi Sport North America	(Italy) Rinaldo Capello (United Kingdom) Allan McNish	Audi 3.6 L Turbo V8	MI	127
3	LMP	1	(United States) Panoz Motor Sports	(Australia) David Brabham (Denmark) Jan Magnussen	Panoz LMP-1 Roadster-S	MI	126
3	LMP	1	(United States) Panoz Motor Sports	(Australia) David Brabham (Denmark) Jan Magnussen	Élan 6L8 6.0 L V8	MI	126
4	LMP	42	(Germany) BMW Motorsport (Germany) Schnitzer Motorsport	(Germany) Jörg Müller (Finland) JJ Lehto	BMW V12 LMR	MI	124
4	LMP	42	(Germany) BMW Motorsport (Germany) Schnitzer Motorsport	(Germany) Jörg Müller (Finland) JJ Lehto	BMW S70 6.0 L V12	MI	124
5	LMP	43	(Germany) BMW Motorsport (Germany) Schnitzer Motorsport	(France) Jean-Marc Gounon (United States) Bill Auberlen	BMW V12 LMR	MI	124
5	LMP	43	(Germany) BMW Motorsport (Germany) Schnitzer Motorsport	(France) Jean-Marc Gounon (United States) Bill Auberlen	BMW S70 6.0 L V12	MI	124
6	LMP	2	(United States) Panoz Motor Sports	(United States) Johnny O'Connell (Japan) Hiroki Katou	Panoz LMP-1 Roadster-S	MI	123
6	LMP	2	(United States) Panoz Motor Sports	(United States) Johnny O'Connell (Japan) Hiroki Katou	Élan 6L8 6.0 L V8	MI	123
7	LMP	36	(United States) Johansson-Matthews Racing	(Sweden) Stefan Johansson (United Kingdom) Guy Smith	Reynard 2KQ-LM	Y	122
7	LMP	36	(United States) Johansson-Matthews Racing	(Sweden) Stefan Johansson (United Kingdom) Guy Smith	Judd GV4 4.0 L V10	Y	122
8	**GTS**	**3**	**(United States) Corvette Racing**	**(United States) Andy Pilgrim (Canada) Ron Fellows**	**Chevrolet Corvette C5-R**	G	**116**
8	**GTS**	**3**	**(United States) Corvette Racing**	**(United States) Andy Pilgrim (Canada) Ron Fellows**	**Chevrolet 7.0 L V8**	G	**116**
9	LMP	37	(United States) Intersport Racing	(United States) Jon Field (United States) Rick Sutherland	Lola B2K/10	Y	115
9	LMP	37	(United States) Intersport Racing	(United States) Jon Field (United States) Rick Sutherland	Judd GV4 4.0 L V10	Y	115
10	GTS	91	(France) Viper Team Oreca	(Monaco) Olivier Beretta (Austria) Karl Wendlinger	Dodge Viper GTS-R	MI	113
10	GTS	91	(France) Viper Team Oreca	(Monaco) Olivier Beretta (Austria) Karl Wendlinger	Dodge 8.0 L V10	MI	113
11	**GT**	**23**	**(United States) Alex Job Racing**	**(United States) Randy Pobst (Belgium) Bruno Lambert**	**Porsche 911 GT3-R**	MI	**112**
11	**GT**	**23**	**(United States) Alex Job Racing**	**(United States) Randy Pobst (Belgium) Bruno Lambert**	**Porsche 3.6 L Flat-6**	MI	**112**
12	GT	51	(United States) Dick Barbour Racing	(Germany) Sascha Maassen (France) Bob Wollek	Porsche 911 GT3-R	MI	111
12	GT	51	(United States) Dick Barbour Racing	(Germany) Sascha Maassen (France) Bob Wollek	Porsche 3.6 L Flat-6	MI	111
13	GT	5	(United States) Dick Barbour Racing	(Germany) Dirk Müller (Germany) Lucas Luhr	Porsche 911 GT3-R	MI	111
13	GT	5	(United States) Dick Barbour Racing	(Germany) Dirk Müller (Germany) Lucas Luhr	Porsche 3.6 L Flat-6	MI	111
14	GT	22	(United States) Alex Job Racing	(United States) Mike Conte (United States) Anthony Lazzaro	Porsche 911 GT3-R	MI	109
14	GT	22	(United States) Alex Job Racing	(United States) Mike Conte (United States) Anthony Lazzaro	Porsche 3.6 L Flat-6	MI	109
15	GT	70	(Australia) Skea Racing International	(United Kingdom) Johnny Mowlem (United States) David Murry	Porsche 911 GT3-R	P	109
15	GT	70	(Australia) Skea Racing International	(United Kingdom) Johnny Mowlem (United States) David Murry	Porsche 3.6 L Flat-6	P	109
16	GT	10	(United States) Prototype Technology Group	(United States) Brian Cunningham (Sweden) Niclas Jönsson	BMW M3	Y	109
16	GT	10	(United States) Prototype Technology Group	(United States) Brian Cunningham (Sweden) Niclas Jönsson	BMW 3.2 L I6	Y	109
17	GT	7	(United States) Prototype Technology Group	(United States) Johannes van Overbeek (Germany) Hans-Joachim Stuck	BMW M3	Y	106
17	GT	7	(United States) Prototype Technology Group	(United States) Johannes van Overbeek (Germany) Hans-Joachim Stuck	BMW 3.2 L I6	Y	106
18	GT	71	(Australia) Skea Racing International	(Australia) Rohan Skea (United States) Doc Bundy	Porsche 911 GT3-R	P	98
18	GT	71	(Australia) Skea Racing International	(Australia) Rohan Skea (United States) Doc Bundy	Porsche 3.6 L Flat-6	P	98
19	GT	30	(United States) White Lightning Racing	(United States) Gunnar Jeannette (United States) Michael Petersen	Porsche 911 GT3-R	MI	98
19	GT	30	(United States) White Lightning Racing	(United States) Gunnar Jeannette (United States) Michael Petersen	Porsche 3.6 L Flat-6	MI	98
20 DNF	GTS	92	(France) Viper Team Oreca	(United States) David Donohue (United States) Tommy Archer	Dodge Viper GTS-R	MI	83
20 DNF	GTS	92	(France) Viper Team Oreca	(United States) David Donohue (United States) Tommy Archer	Dodge 8.0 L V10	MI	83
21	GT	15	(United States) Dick Barbour Racing	(United States) Terry Borcheller (United States) Jennifer Tumminelli (Mexico) Randy Wars	Porsche 911 GT3-R	MI	75
21	GT	15	(United States) Dick Barbour Racing	(United States) Terry Borcheller (United States) Jennifer Tumminelli (Mexico) Randy Wars	Porsche 3.6 L Flat-6	MI	75
22	GT	21	(United States) MCR/Aspen Knolls	(United States) Shane Lewis (United States) Cort Wagner	Porsche 911 GT3-R	P	63
22	GT	21	(United States) MCR/Aspen Knolls	(United States) Shane Lewis (United States) Cort Wagner	Porsche 3.6 L Flat-6	P	63
23 DNF	LMP	0	(Italy) Team Rafanelli SRL	(Italy) Mimmo Schiattarella (Belgium) Didier de Radiguès	Lola B2K/10	MI	34
23 DNF	LMP	0	(Italy) Team Rafanelli SRL	(Italy) Mimmo Schiattarella (Belgium) Didier de Radiguès	Judd (Rafanelli) GV4 4.0 L V10	MI	34
24 DNF	LMP	24	(United States) Johansson-Matthews Racing	(United States) Jim Matthews (United States) Mark Simo	Reynard 2KQ-LM	Y	27
24 DNF	LMP	24	(United States) Johansson-Matthews Racing	(United States) Jim Matthews (United States) Mark Simo	Judd GV4 4.0 L V10	Y	27
25 DNF	GTS	08	(United States) Roock Motorsport North America	(United States) Zak Brown (United States) Vic Rice	Porsche 911 GT2	Y	20
25 DNF	GTS	08	(United States) Roock Motorsport North America	(United States) Zak Brown (United States) Vic Rice	Porsche 3.8 L Turbo Flat-6	Y	20
DNS	GTS	09	(United States) Roock Motorsport North America	(United States) Mike Fitzgerald (Germany) Jürgen Lorenz	Porsche 911 GT2	Y	-
DNS	GTS	09	(United States) Roock Motorsport North America	(United States) Mike Fitzgerald (Germany) Jürgen Lorenz	Porsche 3.8 L Turbo Flat-6	Y	-

== Statistics ==
- Pole Position - #77 Audi Sport North America - 1:12.716
- Fastest Lap - #77 Audi Sport North America - 1:12.912
- Distance - 474.995 km
- Average Speed - 171.920 km/h

American Le Mans Series
Previous race: 2000 Grand Prix of Mosport	2000 season	Next race: 2000 Rose City Grand Prix
