= Larry Woody =

Larry "Woodrow" Woody is a retired sports writer for The Tennessean, the morning newspaper in Nashville, Tennessee. He is a three-time winner of the Tennessee Sports Writer of the Year award and is the author of several books, including Along For The Ride.

Woody covered NASCAR from the early 1960s to late 2007 in addition to SEC sports, minor league baseball, the Tennessee Titans, and the Vanderbilt Commodores. The first NASCAR race he ever attended, he reluctantly covered.

He was inducted into the Martin Methodist College Sports Hall Of Fame, part of the 2001–2002 class.

Woody took early retirement from The Tennessean in August, 2007.

== Tony Stewart Controversy ==
During 2001–2002, Cup driver Tony Stewart had several negative encounters with the media. One of these included Larry Woody, who went over the incident in depth in his book Along For The Ride.

After the 2001 Sharpie 500 at Bristol Motor Speedway in which Stewart won after a duel with Jeff Gordon. The year before, Gordon had defeated Stewart and the two traded a lot of paint which prompted Stewart to intentionally bump into Gordon on pit road afterward leading to his first of many fines. During the post-race press conference following the 2001 victory, Woody asked Stewart if the 2000 battle had crossed his mind during the closing laps. Stewart asked Woody if he was a "local" and the two traded a few more words before the driver said "Look, if you've got a question I wish you'd go ahead and ask it. I'd like to get out of here sometime tonight!" Woody repeated the question and an angry Stewart (whom Woody described in the book as being "accustomed to intimidating the media" and not used to one of them "refusing to be intimidated and standing up to him".) NASCAR official Danielle Humphrey ended up stepping in between, asking "Any further questions for Tony?"

== Books ==
- Dixie Farewell: The Life and Death of Chucky Mullins (1994) Eggman Publishing. ISBN 978-0-9635026-6-7
- Pure Sterling: The Sterling Marlin Story (1995) Eggman Publishing. ISBN 978-1-886371-06-4
- Sterling Marlin: The Silver Bullet (2002) ISBN 978-1-58261-567-7
- Sterling Marlin: Heading Into The Turn (2002) ISBN 978-1-58261-566-0
- Along for the Ride: A Collection of Stories from the Fast and Furious World of NASCAR (2004) Sports Publishing LLC. ISBN 1-58261-696-5
- Mark Martin: Mark Of Excellence (2004) Sports Publishing LLC. ISBN 978-1-58261-759-6
