= Hoofbeat (festival) =

Music festival in Cadott, Wisconsin, US

Coordinates: 45°02′38″N 91°10′40″W

Hoofbeat Country Fest
- Genre: Country
- Dates: June 25-27, 2026
- Location: Cadott, Wisconsin
- Years active: 1987–2019, 2021–Present Day
- Founders: Duane Crank, Mike Asher, Lyle Goettl, & Ronnie Hager
- Website: hoofbeatfestival.com

Hoofbeat, formerly Country Fest, is an annual music festival held in late June at the Amphitheater Venue in Cadott, Wisconsin. Established in 1987, it is the largest country music and camping event in the United States.

== Overview ==
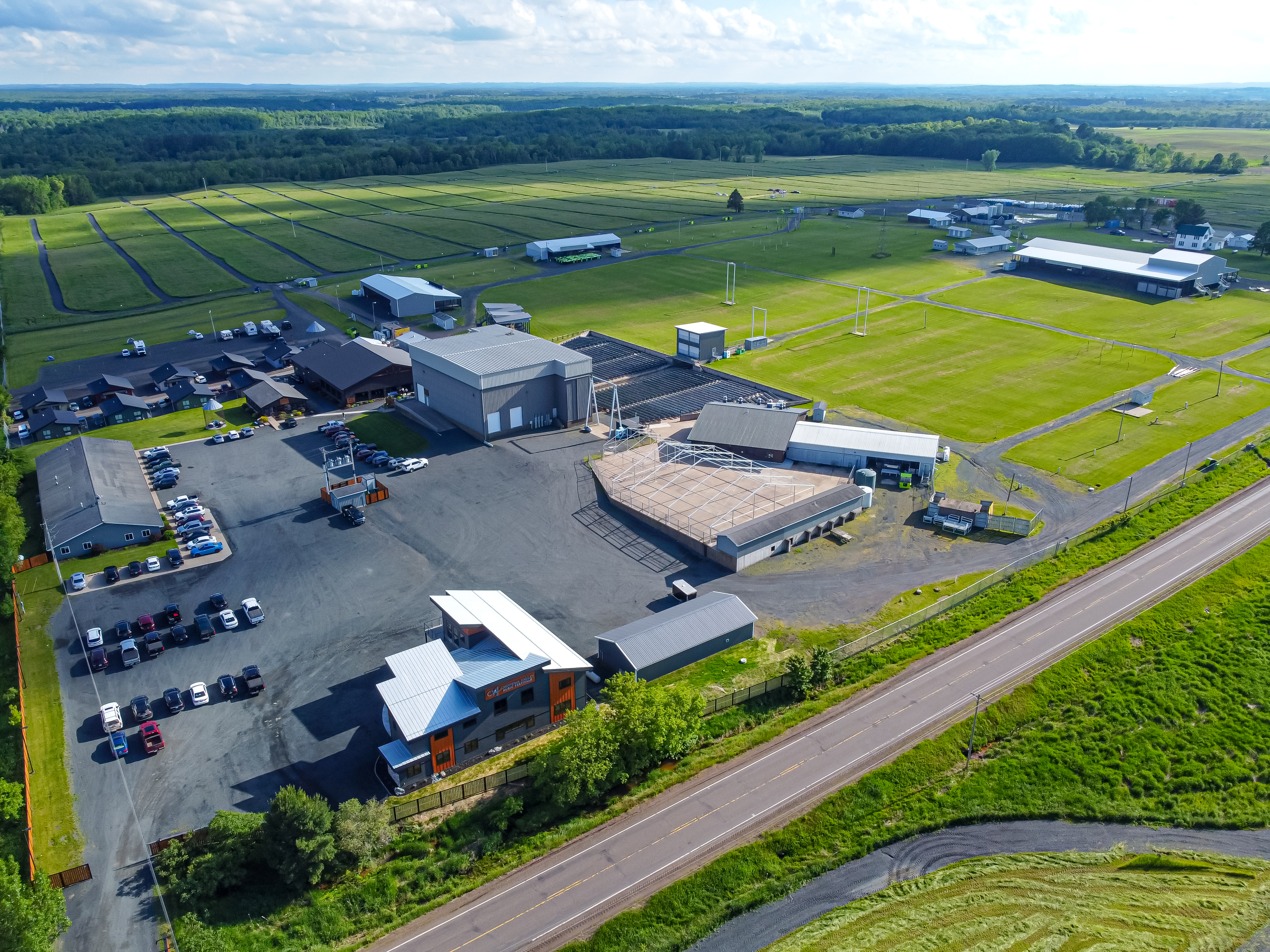

Hoofbeat is three days of music and entertainment on the grounds of a permanent festival site that is now one of the longest-running summer festivals in the country.

Hoofbeat is held in a natural 380-acre amphitheater in central Wisconsin. The main stage, four side stages, and surrounding infrastructure are permanent structures with over 7,500 campsites surrounding the concert grounds. Major performances are scheduled for the main stage each day of the three-day event. Regional bands perform at various times on the side stages between the main stage and the Crossroads hilltop stage throughout the festival. VIP, Reserved, Reserved Lawn, or General Admission ticket packages are often available along with Camping & Pit Passes for all three days. Changes are often being made to improve the festival experience at Hoofbeat and are often posted on the website.

Acts that have performed at Hoofbeat, include Brad Paisley, Carrie Underwood, Keith Urban, Kenny Chesney, George Strait, Johnny Cash, Jason Aldean, Lady Antebellum, Little Big Town, and Miranda Lambert as well as Reba McEntire, Blake Shelton, Taylor Swift, Luke Bryan, Jake Owen, Eric Church, Florida Georgia Line and Tim McGraw.

== See also ==
- List of country music festivals
- Country music
