= 1987 Coca-Cola 600 =

Tenth race of the 1987 NASCAR Winston Cup Series

Race details
- Race 10 of 29 in the 1987 NASCAR Winston Cup Series
- The 1987 Coca-Cola 600 program cover, featuring Buddy Baker and Dale Earnhardt. Artwork by NASCAR artist Sam Bass.
- Date: May 24, 1987
- Official name: 28th Annual Coca-Cola 600
- Location: Concord, North Carolina, Charlotte Motor Speedway
- Course: Permanent racing facility
- Course length: 1.5 miles (2.414 km)
- Distance: 400 laps, 600 mi (965.606 km)
- Average speed: 131.483 miles per hour (211.601 km/h)
- Attendance: 165,000

Pole position
Driver	Bill Elliott	Melling Racing
- Time: 31.597

Most laps led
Driver	Bill Elliott	Melling Racing
- Laps: 186

Winner
No. 21	Kyle Petty	Wood Brothers Racing

Television in the United States
- Network: Jefferson-Pilot
- Announcers: Mike Hogewood, Jerry Punch

Radio in the United States
- Radio: Motor Racing Network

The 1987 Coca-Cola 600 was the tenth stock car race of the 1987 NASCAR Winston Cup Series season and the 28th iteration of the event. The race was held on Sunday, May 24, 1987, before an audience of 165,000 in Concord, North Carolina, at Charlotte Motor Speedway, a 1.5 miles (2.4 km) permanent quad-oval. The race took the scheduled 400 laps to complete.

In a race of attrition that saw numerous crashes and engine failures due to high heat, Wood Brothers Racing's Kyle Petty managed to take advantage of several incidences of drivers dropping out of the race, taking the lead by lap 383 when Rusty Wallace's engine malfunctioned. On the final restart with 12 laps left, Petty was able to pull away to take his second career NASCAR Winston Cup Series victory and his only victory of the season. To fill out the top three, King Racing's Morgan Shepherd and owner-driver Lake Speed finished second and third, respectively.

== Background ==
The layout of Charlotte Motor Speedway, the venue where the race was held.

Charlotte Motor Speedway is a motorsports complex located in Concord, North Carolina, United States 13 miles from Charlotte, North Carolina. The complex features a 1.5 miles (2.4 km) quad oval track that hosts NASCAR racing including the prestigious Coca-Cola 600 on Memorial Day weekend and the NEXTEL All-Star Challenge, as well as the UAW-GM Quality 500. The speedway was built in 1959 by Bruton Smith and is considered the home track for NASCAR with many race teams located in the Charlotte area. The track is owned and operated by Speedway Motorsports Inc. (SMI) with Marcus G. Smith (son of Bruton Smith) as track president.

=== Entry list ===
- (R) denotes rookie driver.

#	Driver	Team	Make	Sponsor
1	Brett Bodine	Ellington Racing	Buick	Bull's-Eye Barbecue Sauce
3	Dale Earnhardt	Richard Childress Racing	Chevrolet	Wrangler
03	Allan Grice	Jane Racing	Oldsmobile	Foster's Lager
4	Rick Wilson	Morgan–McClure Motorsports	Oldsmobile	Kodak
04	Graeme Crosby	Jane Racing	Oldsmobile	Foster's Lager
5	Geoff Bodine	Hendrick Motorsports	Chevrolet	Levi Garrett
6	Connie Saylor	U.S. Racing	Chevrolet	U.S. Racing
7	Alan Kulwicki	AK Racing	Ford	Zerex
8	Bobby Hillin Jr.	Stavola Brothers Racing	Buick	Miller American
9	Bill Elliott	Melling Racing	Ford	Coors
11	Terry Labonte	Junior Johnson & Associates	Chevrolet	Budweiser
12	Slick Johnson (Note: Johnson was injured in a practice accident practicing for a late model race on Friday, May 22. The team replaced Johnson with short track driver Mark Martin as a last second replacement.)	Hamby Racing	Chevrolet	Hamby Racing
15	Ricky Rudd	Bud Moore Engineering	Ford	Motorcraft Quality Parts
16	Larry Pearson	Pearson Racing	Chevrolet	Chattanooga Chew
17	Darrell Waltrip	Hendrick Motorsports	Chevrolet	Tide
18	Dale Jarrett (R)	Freedlander Motorsports	Chevrolet	Freedlander Financial
19	Derrike Cope (R)	Stoke Racing	Ford	Alugard
21	Kyle Petty	Wood Brothers Racing	Ford	Citgo
22	Bobby Allison	Stavola Brothers Racing	Buick	Miller American
26	Morgan Shepherd	King Racing	Buick	Quaker State
27	Rusty Wallace	Blue Max Racing	Pontiac	Kodiak
28	Davey Allison (R)	Ranier-Lundy Racing	Ford	Texaco, Havoline
29	Cale Yarborough	Cale Yarborough Motorsports	Oldsmobile	Hardee's
30	Michael Waltrip	Bahari Racing	Chevrolet	All Pro Auto Parts
32	Jonathan Lee Edwards	Edwards Racing	Chevrolet	Edwards Racing
33	Harry Gant	Mach 1 Racing	Chevrolet	Skoal Bandit
34	Jesse Samples Jr.	AAG Racing	Chevrolet	Allen's Glass
35	Benny Parsons	Hendrick Motorsports	Chevrolet	Folgers
36	H. B. Bailey	Bailey Racing	Pontiac	Almeda Auto Parts
40	Robbie Faggart	Faggart Racing	Oldsmobile	All Pro Auto Parts
43	Richard Petty	Petty Enterprises	Pontiac	STP
44	Sterling Marlin	Hagan Racing	Oldsmobile	Piedmont Airlines
48	Tony Spanos	Hylton Motorsports	Chevrolet	Hylton Motorsports
50	Greg Sacks	Dingman Brothers Racing	Pontiac	Valvoline
52	Jimmy Means	Jimmy Means Racing	Pontiac	In-Fisherman
55	Phil Parsons	Jackson Bros. Motorsports	Oldsmobile	Copenhagen
62	Steve Christman (R)	Winkle Motorsports	Pontiac	AC Spark Plug
64	Rodney Combs	Langley Racing	Ford	Sunny King Ford
66	Donnie Allison	Jackson Bros. Motorsports	Oldsmobile	Skoal
67	Buddy Arrington	Arrington Racing	Ford	Pannill Sweatshirts
70	J. D. McDuffie	McDuffie Racing	Pontiac	Rumple Furniture
71	Dave Marcis	Marcis Auto Racing	Chevrolet	Lifebuoy
73	Phil Barkdoll	Barkdoll Racing	Chevrolet	Helen Rae Special
74	Bobby Wawak	Wawak Racing	Chevrolet	Wawak Racing
75	Neil Bonnett	RahMoc Enterprises	Pontiac	Valvoline
77	Eddie Bierschwale	Ragan Racing	Ford	All Pro Auto Parts
80	Jimmy Horton	S&H Racing	Ford	S&H Racing
81	Chet Fillip	Fillip Racing	Ford	Warr Valves
82	Mark Stahl	Stahl Racing	Ford	Auto Bell Car Wash
83	Lake Speed	Speed Racing	Oldsmobile	Wynn's, Kmart
87	Randy Baker	Buck Baker Racing	Chevrolet	Sony
88	Buddy Baker	Baker–Schiff Racing	Oldsmobile	Crisco
89	Jim Sauter	Mueller Brothers Racing	Pontiac	Evinrude Outboard Motors
90	Ken Schrader	Donlavey Racing	Ford	Red Baron Frozen Pizza
93	Charlie Baker	Salmon Racing	Chevrolet	Salmon Racing
99	Brad Teague	Ball Motorsports	Chevrolet	Ball Motorsports

== Qualifying ==
Qualifying was split into two rounds. The first round was held on Wednesday, May 20, at 3:00 PM EST. Each driver had one lap to set a time. During the first round, the top 20 drivers in the round were guaranteed a starting spot in the race. If a driver was not able to guarantee a spot in the first round, they had the option to scrub their time from the first round and try and run a faster lap time in a second round qualifying run, held on Thursday, May 21, at 2:00 PM EST. As with the first round, each driver had one lap to set a time. For this specific race, positions 21-40 were decided on time, and depending on who needed it, a select amount of positions were given to cars who had not otherwise qualified but were high enough in owner's points; up to two were given.

Bill Elliott, driving for Melling Racing, managed to win the pole, setting a time of 31.597 and an average speed of 170.901 miles per hour (275.038 km/h) in the first round.

14 drivers failed to qualify.

=== Full qualifying results ===
Pos.	#	Driver	Team	Make	Time	Speed
1	9	Bill Elliott	Melling Racing	Ford	31.597	170.901
2	22	Bobby Allison	Stavola Brothers Racing	Buick	31.735	170.160
3	3	Dale Earnhardt	Richard Childress Racing	Chevrolet	31.815	169.732
4	90	Ken Schrader	Donlavey Racing	Ford	31.833	169.634
5	33	Harry Gant	Mach 1 Racing	Chevrolet	32.036	168.561
6	16	Larry Pearson	Pearson Racing	Chevrolet	32.044	168.521
7	21	Kyle Petty	Wood Brothers Racing	Ford	32.054	168.466
8	55	Phil Parsons	Jackson Bros. Motorsports	Oldsmobile	32.112	168.161
9	1	Brett Bodine	Ellington Racing	Chevrolet	32.126	168.088
10	7	Alan Kulwicki	AK Racing	Ford	32.130	168.067
11	88	Buddy Baker	Baker–Schiff Racing	Oldsmobile	32.150	167.963
12	29	Cale Yarborough	Cale Yarborough Motorsports	Oldsmobile	32.168	167.871
13	35	Benny Parsons	Hendrick Motorsports	Chevrolet	32.191	167.749
14	83	Lake Speed	Speed Racing	Oldsmobile	32.197	167.717
15	8	Bobby Hillin Jr.	Stavola Brothers Racing	Buick	32.240	167.493
16	28	Davey Allison (R)	Ranier-Lundy Racing	Ford	32.247	167.456
17	50	Greg Sacks	Dingman Brothers Racing	Pontiac	32.248	167.452
18	77	Eddie Bierschwale	Ragan Racing	Ford	32.259	167.394
19	11	Terry Labonte	Junior Johnson & Associates	Chevrolet	32.316	167.099
20	26	Morgan Shepherd	King Racing	Buick	32.324	167.061
Failed to lock in Round 1
21	5	Geoff Bodine	Hendrick Motorsports	Chevrolet	31.887	169.348
22	75	Neil Bonnett	RahMoc Enterprises	Pontiac	32.051	168.481
23	27	Rusty Wallace	Blue Max Racing	Pontiac	32.062	168.424
24	44	Sterling Marlin	Hagan Racing	Oldsmobile	32.065	168.408
25	15	Ricky Rudd	Bud Moore Engineering	Ford	32.258	167.400
26	19	Derrike Cope (R)	Stoke Racing	Ford	32.273	167.323
27	71	Dave Marcis	Marcis Auto Racing	Chevrolet	32.276	167.307
28	43	Richard Petty	Petty Enterprises	Pontiac	32.329	167.033
29	6	Connie Saylor	U.S. Racing	Chevrolet	32.372	166.811
30	67	Buddy Arrington	Arrington Racing	Ford	32.412	166.605
31	17	Darrell Waltrip	Hendrick Motorsports	Chevrolet	32.421	166.559
32	4	Rick Wilson	Morgan–McClure Motorsports	Oldsmobile	32.426	166.533
33	87	Randy Baker	Buck Baker Racing	Chevrolet	32.436	166.482
34	62	Steve Christman (R)	Winkle Motorsports	Pontiac	32.440	166.461
35	18	Dale Jarrett (R)	Freedlander Motorsports	Chevrolet	32.445	166.436
36	03	Allan Grice	Jane Racing	Oldsmobile	32.475	166.282
37	89	Jim Sauter	Mueller Brothers Racing	Pontiac	32.483	166.241
38	30	Michael Waltrip	Bahari Racing	Chevrolet	32.490	166.205
39	99	Brad Teague	Ball Motorsports	Chevrolet	32.494	166.185
40	74	Bobby Wawak	Wawak Racing	Chevrolet	32.509	166.108
Provisionals
41	12	Slick Johnson	Hamby Racing	Oldsmobile	32.681	165.234
42	52	Jimmy Means	Jimmy Means Racing	Pontiac	32.705	165.112
Failed to qualify (results unknown)
43	04	Graeme Crosby	Jane Racing	Oldsmobile	-*	-*
44	32	Jonathan Lee Edwards	Edwards Racing	Chevrolet	-*	-*
45	34	Jesse Samples Jr.	AAG Racing	Chevrolet	-*	-*
46	36	H. B. Bailey	Bailey Racing	Pontiac	-*	-*
47	40	Robbie Faggart	Faggart Racing	Oldsmobile	-*	-*
48	48	Tony Spanos	Hylton Motorsports	Chevrolet	-*	-*
49	64	Rodney Combs	Langley Racing	Ford	-*	-*
50	66	Donnie Allison	Jackson Bros. Motorsports	Oldsmobile	-*	-*
51	70	J. D. McDuffie	McDuffie Racing	Pontiac	-*	-*
52	73	Phil Barkdoll	Barkdoll Racing	Chevrolet	-*	-*
53	80	Jimmy Horton	S&H Racing	Ford	-*	-*
54	81	Chet Fillip	Fillip Racing	Ford	-*	-*
55	82	Mark Stahl	Stahl Racing	Ford	-*	-*
56	93	Charlie Baker	Salmon Racing	Chevrolet	-*	-*
Official first round qualifying results
Official starting lineup

== Race results ==
Fin	St	#	Driver	Team	Make	Laps	Led	Status	Pts	Winnings
1	7	21	Kyle Petty	Wood Brothers Racing	Ford	400	35	running	180	$89,405
2	20	26	Morgan Shepherd	King Racing	Buick	399	0	running	170	$49,070
3	14	83	Lake Speed	Speed Racing	Oldsmobile	399	0	running	165	$27,625
4	28	43	Richard Petty	Petty Enterprises	Pontiac	398	0	running	160	$24,925
5	31	17	Darrell Waltrip	Hendrick Motorsports	Chevrolet	398	0	running	155	$16,900
6	19	11	Terry Labonte	Junior Johnson & Associates	Chevrolet	398	0	running	150	$22,180
7	11	88	Buddy Baker	Baker–Schiff Racing	Oldsmobile	398	0	running	146	$12,000
8	8	55	Phil Parsons	Jackson Bros. Motorsports	Oldsmobile	398	0	running	142	$13,400
9	37	89	Jim Sauter	Mueller Brothers Racing	Pontiac	396	0	running	138	$9,400
10	23	27	Rusty Wallace	Blue Max Racing	Pontiac	396	62	running	139	$28,375
11	38	30	Michael Waltrip	Bahari Racing	Chevrolet	393	0	running	130	$13,390
12	30	67	Buddy Arrington	Arrington Racing	Ford	384	0	running	127	$11,770
13	22	75	Neil Bonnett	RahMoc Enterprises	Pontiac	379	1	accident	129	$11,140
14	27	71	Dave Marcis	Marcis Auto Racing	Chevrolet	363	2	running	126	$10,470
15	42	52	Jimmy Means	Jimmy Means Racing	Pontiac	358	0	running	118	$11,150
16	16	28	Davey Allison (R)	Ranier-Lundy Racing	Ford	351	88	engine	120	$6,550
17	33	87	Randy Baker	Buck Baker Racing	Chevrolet	338	0	running	112	$5,500
18	21	5	Geoff Bodine	Hendrick Motorsports	Chevrolet	322	7	running	114	$12,700
19	40	74	Bobby Wawak	Wawak Racing	Chevrolet	308	0	engine	106	$4,950
20	3	3	Dale Earnhardt	Richard Childress Racing	Chevrolet	305	0	running	103	$19,600
21	9	1	Brett Bodine	Ellington Racing	Chevrolet	300	17	engine	105	$4,850
22	2	22	Bobby Allison	Stavola Brothers Racing	Buick	298	1	engine	102	$16,200
23	1	9	Bill Elliott	Melling Racing	Ford	267	186	engine	104	$82,050
24	5	33	Harry Gant	Mach 1 Racing	Chevrolet	258	0	engine	91	$8,405
25	25	15	Ricky Rudd	Bud Moore Engineering	Ford	254	0	accident	88	$11,950
26	13	35	Benny Parsons	Hendrick Motorsports	Chevrolet	247	0	engine	85	$12,100
27	10	7	Alan Kulwicki	AK Racing	Ford	229	1	accident	87	$6,945
28	18	77	Eddie Bierschwale	Ragan Racing	Ford	221	0	accident	79	$2,300
29	4	90	Ken Schrader	Donlavey Racing	Ford	215	0	engine	76	$7,375
30	32	4	Rick Wilson	Morgan–McClure Motorsports	Oldsmobile	207	0	accident	73	$2,000
31	6	16	Larry Pearson	Pearson Racing	Chevrolet	202	0	accident	70	$2,600
32	24	44	Sterling Marlin	Hagan Racing	Oldsmobile	179	0	camshaft	67	$4,615
33	29	6	Connie Saylor	U.S. Racing	Chevrolet	177	0	engine	64	$4,555
34	15	8	Bobby Hillin Jr.	Stavola Brothers Racing	Buick	162	0	overheating	61	$8,750
35	36	03	Allan Grice	Jane Racing	Oldsmobile	161	0	rear end	0	$1,700
36	17	50	Greg Sacks	Dingman Brothers Racing	Pontiac	114	0	a frame	55	$1,650
37	26	19	Derrike Cope (R)	Stoke Racing	Ford	93	0	water pump	52	$1,600
38	35	18	Dale Jarrett (R)	Freedlander Motorsports	Chevrolet	84	0	engine	49	$4,310
39	41	12	Mark Martin	Hamby Racing	Oldsmobile	68	0	engine	46	$3,550
40	39	99	Brad Teague	Ball Motorsports	Chevrolet	46	0	electrical	43	$1,525
41	34	62	Steve Christman (R)	Winkle Motorsports	Pontiac	28	0	engine	40	$1,525
42	12	29	Cale Yarborough	Cale Yarborough Motorsports	Oldsmobile	19	0	oil line	37	$1,525
Failed to qualify (results unknown)
43		04	Graeme Crosby	Jane Racing	Oldsmobile					
44		32	Jonathan Lee Edwards	Edwards Racing	Chevrolet					
45		34	Jesse Samples Jr.	AAG Racing	Chevrolet					
46		36	H. B. Bailey	Bailey Racing	Pontiac					
47		40	Robbie Faggart	Faggart Racing	Oldsmobile					
48		48	Tony Spanos	Hylton Motorsports	Chevrolet					
49		64	Rodney Combs	Langley Racing	Ford					
50		66	Donnie Allison	Jackson Bros. Motorsports	Oldsmobile					
51		70	J. D. McDuffie	McDuffie Racing	Pontiac					
52		73	Phil Barkdoll	Barkdoll Racing	Chevrolet					
53		80	Jimmy Horton	S&H Racing	Ford					
54		81	Chet Fillip	Fillip Racing	Ford					
55		82	Mark Stahl	Stahl Racing	Ford					
56		93	Charlie Baker	Salmon Racing	Chevrolet					
Official race results

== Standings after the race ==
Drivers' Championship standings

	Pos	Driver	Points
	1	Dale Earnhardt	1,658
	2	Bill Elliott	1,439 (-219)
	3	Neil Bonnett	1,418 (-240)
	4	Terry Labonte	1,403 (–255)
	5	Richard Petty	1,380 (–278)
1	6	Kyle Petty	1,374 (–284)
1	7	Rusty Wallace	1,355 (–303)
2	8	Darrell Waltrip	1,307 (–351)
1	9	Ken Schrader	1,251 (–407)
1	10	Ricky Rudd	1,246 (–412)
Official driver's standings

- Note: Only the first 10 positions are included for the driver standings.

== Notes ==
Previous race: 1987 Winston 500	NASCAR Winston Cup Series; 1987 season	Next race: 1987 Budweiser 500
