= Humpy Wheeler =

American racing executive (1938–2025)

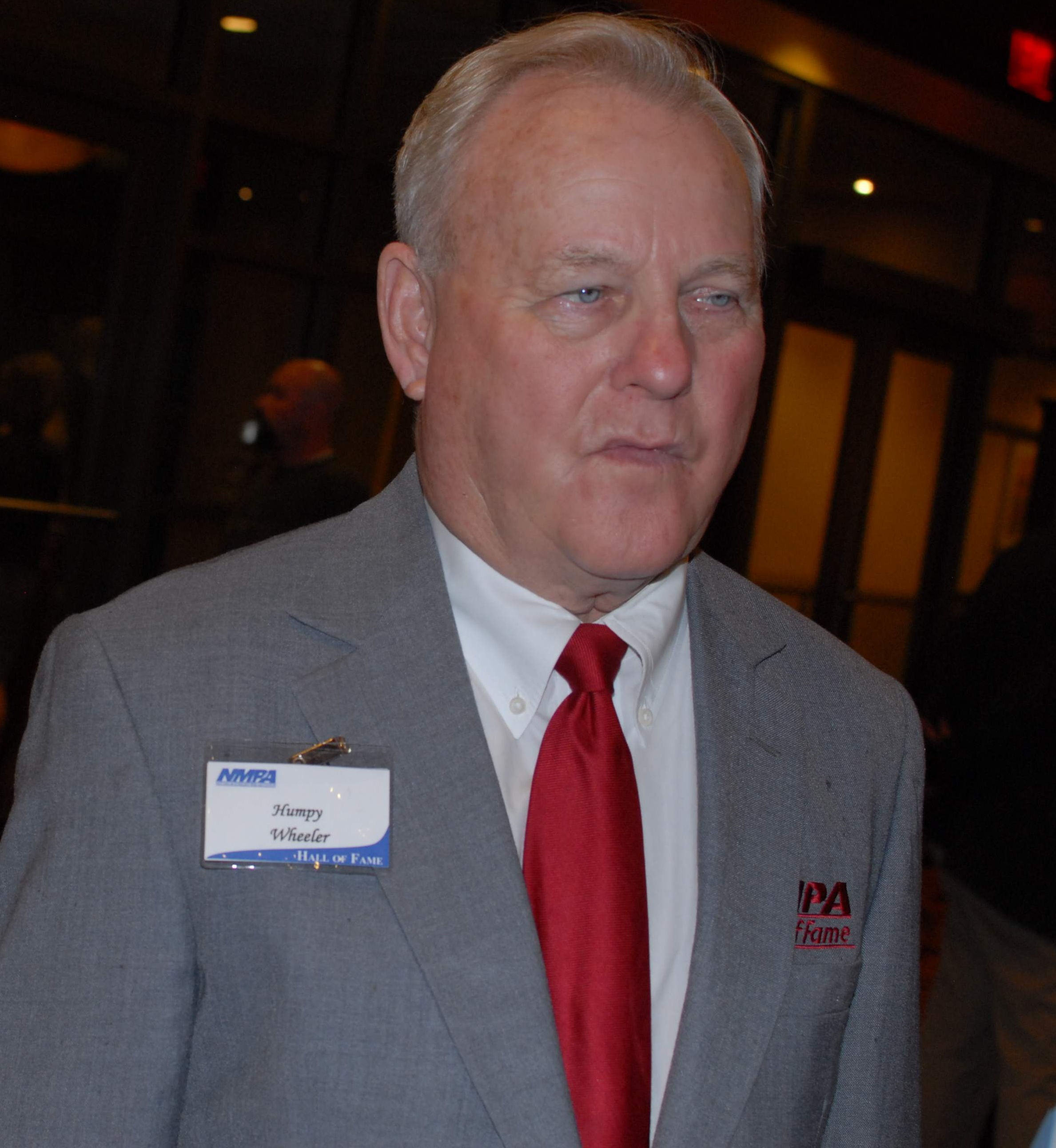
- Wheeler in 2010
- Born: Howard Augustine Wheeler Jr. October 23, 1938; Belmont, North Carolina, U.S.
- Died: August 20, 2025 (aged 86); Charlotte, North Carolina, U.S.
- Other names: H. A. Wheeler; Humpy Wheeler; P. T. Barnum of NASCAR
- Education: University of South Carolina (B.A.)
- Occupations: Racing promoter; consultant; race track general manager
- Organization: Charlotte Motor Speedway
- Spouse: Patricia Adele Williams (m. 1962)
- Children: 3, including Patti
- Parents: Howard Augustine Wheeler Sr.; Kathleen Louise Dobbins

Howard Augustine "Humpy" Wheeler Jr. (October 23, 1938 – August 20, 2025) was an American motorsports executive and businessman. He was best known as the general manager of Charlotte Motor Speedway, a 1.5-mile (2.4 km) banked racetrack in Concord, North Carolina. Wheeler held the positions of publicity directors for numerous companies and later became the president and general manager of the Charlotte Motor Speedway. He was a major auto racing promoter and businessman, particularly in stock car racing and IndyCar racing.

Wheeler was born and raised in Belmont, North Carolina. In 1964, he gained his first major publicity job when he was hired by the Firestone Tire and Rubber Company. After bouncing around real estate and public service jobs when Firestone shut down its racing program in 1970, Wheeler was hired by Charlotte Motor Speedway chairman Bruton Smith as president to replace the outgoing Richard Howard in 1975. During his time at the Charlotte Motor Speedway, he gained a reputation for creating unique promotions for races at the speedway. He abruptly retired from the position in May 2008, a decision that was seen as shocking to most of the NASCAR landscape. After retiring as president of the Charlotte Motor Speedway, he pursued other business endeavors with his advising company The Wheeler Company, including the failed Grand Prix of America proposal and Speedway Benefits, an American short-track alliance program.

Wheeler was regarded as a pioneer in promoting in the motor racing industry. Throughout his time as a racing promoter and general manager, Wheeler was known for pulling off numerous unique promotions and stunts in order to promote the Charlotte Motor Speedway and its races, making him one of the most successful promoters in auto racing. Drivers and industry leaders view Wheeler highly for his promotions and actions during his time at the Charlotte Motor Speedway due to their effectiveness and the unique nature of Wheeler's promotions.

Wheeler was involved in a years-long rivalry with Bruton Smith, the chief executive officer (CEO) of Speedway Motorsports (SMI), the company that owned the Charlotte Motor Speedway. Wheeler, who had worked under Smith since 1975, retired from his position at the Charlotte Motor Speedway in 2008 due to disagreements with Smith, a decision that was seen as a surprise in the NASCAR landscape. Wheeler heavily criticized both NASCAR and Smith for the next twelve years. The two decided to end the rivalry in 2020, after Wheeler made successful attempts to reconnect with Smith.

== Early life ==
Wheeler was born in Belmont, North Carolina, on October 23, 1938, to Howard Augustine Wheeler Sr. (1902–1968) and Kathleen Louise Dobbins (1910–2005). His father was the athletic director and the football head coach at Belmont Abbey College, and often took Wheeler to games. Wheeler often imagined during games how to improve the quality of the events. Wheeler attended Charlotte Catholic High School, a private preparatory school that was connected to Belmont Abbey.

Initially wanting to play football at Charlotte Catholic, he resorted to boxing, as the school did not have a football program. At Charlotte Catholic, Wheeler was known as a jock who had won numerous debate contests.

According to Wheeler, his family was middle class. He said he had learned most of his life lessons from his mother, who owned a mercantile store. Throughout his childhood, he had an "entrepreneurial itch and desire to make my own money", a trait that he credits to his mother. He inherited the moniker "Humpy" through his father, when his father—underage at the time—was caught trying to buy a pack of Camel cigarettes during a football practice session with the Illinois Fighting Illini. He was hesitant to inherit the moniker, as he wanted a different identity from his father. He had tried on numerous occasions to remove the moniker, due to numerous companies not wanting to hire him due to the nickname. After being told he could not work at a New York-based public relations firm with the name Humpy, his father became seriously ill. After seeing his father in his condition, he realized "how much the name meant to me", and eventually inherited it.

Unable to work with cars at the time, at the age of 13, he founded the town's only bicycle repair shop, in hopes that teenagers in the town would break their bicycles. The business became successful, and Wheeler eventually began to hold and promote weekly bicycle races. At the same time, he also held a part-time job at a local hardware store.

Wheeler watched his first auto racing event in 1949 at the age of 11 at the Charlotte Speedway. According to Wheeler, after a Sunday service session, he headed down to a local drive-in where a race car with "wild colors" passed by the restaurant. He later found out from an older friend of his that the car was racing in a stock car race held at the speedway by Bill France Sr. At the age of 15, then old enough to work with cars, he spent most of his time working in a garage with a car owner who fielded and raced a 1937 Ford coupe in races throughout the Carolinas; mainly at Newberry Speedway in Newberry, South Carolina. As a race car driver, he drove at Newberry Speedway until 1960, when he was banned by the promoter of the speedway.

== College education ==
Wheeler initially pursued a professional boxing career, having ambitions to join the 1960 United States Olympic boxing team. He had gotten a scholarship to join the Michigan State boxing team, but the scholarship was later revoked after Michigan State's conference, the Big Ten Conference, entirely withdrew from boxing after a conference boxer died. As a result, Wheeler initially decided to skip college and train in New York-based Stillman's Gym to compete in amateur boxing. After competing in 42 matches with a 40–2 record, he withdrew from boxing after realizing that in his weight class, he could potentially have to face up against Joe Frazier and Muhammad Ali. He instead focused on a football career.

Wheeler accepted a football scholarship to play for the University of South Carolina in February 1957 as a left guard. Playing for the team's freshman squad, Wheeler managed to make the dean's list during the spring semester of 1958. The next season, Wheeler redshirted the season. During his junior season, he suffered a back injury during a scrimmage that led to him being placed into the university's infirmary. The injury left Wheeler temporarily paralyzed as a paraplegic, taking nine months for Wheeler to regain some function in his lower limbs. While Wheeler had hopes of being promoted to the main squad in 1959, the back injury eventually led to Wheeler abandoning his football career. Wheeler graduated from South Carolina in 1961, double majoring in journalism and political science.

== Business and promotional career ==
=== Early business and promotional ventures ===
Wheeler gained his first job in 1956, working as a publicity supervisor for the Allstate Racing Association. He later bounced around numerous publicity jobs, including being the publicity director for the Dixie Auto Racing Company, the International Timing Association, and the University of South Carolina athletic department. He was also the assistant publicity manager of Darlington, South Carolina–based Darlington Raceway, working under Russ Catlin.

During his time at South Carolina, Wheeler was hired as a sports writer for The Columbia Record in 1959. He worked for The Columbia Record until he graduated from South Carolina. After graduating, Wheeler was hired as the promotion copy editor for Charlotte, North Carolina, television station WBTV in February 1961. Two months later, he was promoted to become the publicity director of the station. Around the same time, he obtained a lease to run the Robinwood Speedway in Gastonia, North Carolina. A track that had gained a reputation for being rundown, Wheeler spent around $20,000 (adjusted for inflation, $215,479) to renovate the track. A year later, Wheeler was hired to promote the Starlite Speedway in Monroe, North Carolina, and the Gastonia Fairgrounds the year after. After seeing initial success, Wheeler absorbed heavy amounts of debt due to "judgement against [Wheeler] in accidents" and a lack of insurance according to Wheeler. In addition, Robinwood Speedway was closed in 1963 after the Gastonia Country Club moved near the racetrack. In later interviews, Wheeler stated, "My God, how did I last as long as I did? I was a loose cannon."

=== Firestone Tire and Rubber Company, departure from racing ===
In February 1964, Wheeler was announced by The Charlotte News to have been hired by the Firestone Tire and Rubber Company to be the company's new public relations representative for their racing program. In 1969, Wheeler and Firestone had threatened to exit the NASCAR Grand National Series, citing the fact that the company's rival, the Goodyear Tire and Rubber Company, had the majority of drivers that were directly supported by manufacturers under contract, meaning they could not run a lap with Firestone tires.

In 1970, Wheeler left the company after Firestone closed its public relations office in Charlotte. While Firestone wanted Wheeler to transfer to a new location in Washington, D.C. and despite the fact that he had been working there for two months, his family wanted to stay in Charlotte. Wheeler then moved towards promoting the North Carolina tourism industry and economy, hoping for Charlotte to be a major East Coast seaport by 2000. In November, he denied the sale of Darlington Raceway and the transfer of its two races to a new superspeedway between the South Carolinan cities of Myrtle Beach and Conway. In 1971, he was named the public service director for the city of Charlotte. By early 1972, he had hopes of turning Asheville into the North Carolina's leading seaport.

In May of the same year, he resigned from the city of Charlotte to become the public relations director for the Ervin Company, a real estate development company. By early of 1973, he had ambitions of turning the Charlotte housing industry more "interchangeable", wanting houses in Charlotte to feel like homes consumers could associate with. In early 1975, he became the vice chairman of the Charlotte–Mecklenburg Bicentennial Celebration, a celebration that commemorated the United States Bicentennial in Mecklenburg County. He was able to attract then-President of the United States Gerald Ford to the celebration.

=== Return to racing industry at Charlotte Motor Speedway, brief boxing stint ===
In 1975, then-Charlotte Motor Speedway chairman Bruton Smith had planned to become the majority shareholder of the speedway, attempting to complete a takeover of the speedway from the previous chairman and the president of the speedway at the time, Richard Howard. On August 29, The Charlotte News announced that Wheeler had been hired by Smith as the development director for the speedway. Shortly thereafter, Howard felt threatened for his position due to Wheeler's hiring, with the local North Carolina media predicting that Wheeler would most likely be the final piece for Smith to complete a takeover of the speedway's control. By early October, Howard announced his intentions to resign as president during the annual stockholders' meeting on January 30, 1976, with Wheeler predicted to replace Howard. On the day of the annual stockholders' meeting, Howard officially announced his retirement, with Wheeler to replace the outgoing Howard.

Within his first year as president, Wheeler announced a $3–5 million renovation that was scheduled to be completed in 1981. By the start of the 1980s, Wheeler had gained a reputation for pulling off unique promotions that eventually led to the World 600 becoming the second most-attended racing event in the entirety of the United States, behind the Indianapolis 500. Wheeler also stated his desire to expand NASCAR to a national market, when the league mainly had stuck to a Southeastern market at the time.

In the early 1980s, Wheeler had ambitions to promote professional boxing in Charlotte. In 1982, he set up a fight between Bernard Taylor and Eusebio Pedroza that was set to be held at the Charlotte Coliseum on August 14 for the World Boxing Association featherweight championship. The fight was the first world championship boxing match to occur in Charlotte. On July 22, the fight was announced to be postponed with no future date, a decision that was seen as a major blow to the Charlotte economy. The fight was eventually rescheduled to October 16. However, during a press conference that was scheduled to announced the undercards to the title fight, Wheeler stated that he and Top Rank would never promote another boxing match in Charlotte, stating that he had thought the Charlotte Boxing Commission demanded too much revenue from the fight.

Wheeler, with the help of Smith, continued expanding and renovating the speedway throughout the 1980s. To celebrate the track's 25th anniversary, Wheeler directed the construction of condominiums in 1983, scheduled to be completed in time by 1984. While the idea was mocked at the time, by the project's completion, every condominium had sold out by 1983. In 1985, with the help of the R. J. Reynolds Tobacco Company, he formulated The Winston (now called the NASCAR All-Star Race), a race featuring past winners of the previous season. In 1987, Wheeler directed the construction of a private club and restaurant named The Speedway Club. By the end of the 1980s, the Charlotte Motor Speedway had a capacity of 170,922.

==== NASCAR Sportsman Division ====
In January 1989, Wheeler announced the creation of the NASCAR Sportsman Division, a series that had the stated goal to give drivers who were accustomed to short track racing some experience on bigger speedways, such as superspeedways. Within the six years of the series' existence, the series gathered a negative reputation as a dangerous, unsafe series. Throughout the series' existence, numerous drivers, such as David Gaines in 1990, Gary Batson in 1992, and most notably Russell Phillips in 1995, were all killed in accidents, with the third being decapitated when Phillips' head hit a caution light when his car's roof was exposed in the accident. By the time Phillips' accident occurred, the series had been placed under increased scrutiny for safety issues, with drivers suffering injuries in crashes becoming a commonality. On November 28, 1995, Wheeler announced his plans to leave the series, leaving it in control of NASCAR, who quickly disbanded the series by the end of 1996.

==== Speedway Motorsports era ====
In 1991, to promote the 1992 The Winston, Wheeler, with the help of Bruton Smith and Iowa-based Musco Lighting directed the installation of lights at the Charlotte Motor Speedway for nighttime racing. At the time, the installation was seen as a major feat, as no oval track as large as Charlotte Motor Speedway had installed permanent lights before. The lights were installed by April 1992. In 1995, Wheeler became the president and chief operating officer of the newly incorporated Speedway Motorsports (SMI), started by Smith. In 1997, Wheeler and the speedway hosted the first Indy Racing League race at the speedway. In 1999, Wheeler and hardware retail chain Lowe's agreed to buy out the naming rights to the speedway.

Heading into the 2000s, with NASCAR experiencing the deaths of Adam Petty, Kenny Irwin Jr., Tony Roper, and Dale Earnhardt in 2000 and 2001, Wheeler partnered with Las Vegas–based engineer Paul Lew to create the Humpy Bumper, a bumper designed to absorb energy in head-on collisions. Prior to the 2005 Coca-Cola 600, Wheeler directed the levigation of the speedway, which led to numerous problems for both of the speedway's races in 2005. Due to these problems, Wheeler ordered the repaving of the speedway in 2006. In that same year, he joined the advisory board of Carolinks, a Charleston, South Carolina-based intermodal company. In January 2008, Wheeler stated his desire to host regional open auditions at the speedway for the eighth season of American Idol.

=== Leaving Charlotte Motor Speedway, later business ventures ===
On May 21, 2008, days after the 2008 NASCAR Sprint All-Star Race, Wheeler announced his retirement from his position as president of the Charlotte Motor Speedway due to numerous disagreements with Bruton Smith, with the retirement effective after the 2008 Coca-Cola 600. The decision was seen as both shocking and abrupt to most of the NASCAR landscape, with most having thought that Wheeler had left too early. Wheeler was replaced by Smith's son, Marcus G. Smith.

Almost three months after his retirement from the Charlotte Motor Speedway, Wheeler announced the founding of The Wheeler Company, a management consulting firm that focused on both motorsports and general sports. In 2009, Wheeler was rumored that he was seeking a management job at the Indianapolis Motor Speedway after he had skipped attending the 2009 Coca-Cola 600 and the celebration of the Charlotte Motor Speedway's 50th anniversary in favor of attending the 2009 Indianapolis 500. In June, Wheeler later clarified that he was "in the talking stage" of providing marketing and consulting assistance to the IndyCar Series. In addition, he stated that he was not interested in replacing Tony George as president of the speedway. Before the statement, George was rumored to have been forced out of his role as the president of the Indianapolis Motor Speedway.

In 2010, Wheeler authored an autobiography along with Peter Golenbock named Growing Up NASCAR: Racing's Most Outrageous Promoter Tells All. The book featured stories of certain promotions held by Wheeler told from his perspective. According to Wheeler, the book was cut from over 600 pages to 218 pages due to too much content. The book opened to positive reviews from both Bleacher Report and The Charlotte Observer.

In 2011, Wheeler was announced as an advisor to the proposed Grand Prix of America, a Formula One street course race proposal that would have taken place near Port Imperial, New Jersey.

On October 9, 2013, Wheeler founded Speedway Benefits, a marketing and advertising partnership that sought to combine short tracks across the United States into a single body for the purposes of contract negotiations with suppliers, advertisers, and business partners. The partnership sought to oversee the growth of "grassroots racing" by bargaining for more advertising profits and to seek an overall lower cost of operation for short tracks. While seeing initial success, by 2018, most tracks had left the alliance to return to "older ways", with only around 75 tracks still in the alliance for lower food concession costs.

== Promotions ==
=== Charlotte Motor Speedway ===
After becoming president of the Charlotte Motor Speedway in September 1975, Wheeler, using his experience from his dirt track promotion days, spurred promotions that attempted to create drama; mainly, by adding cash incentives for certain achievements. By 1977, the World 600 became the second-highest paying race on the NASCAR Winston Cup Series circuit, only behind the Daytona 500.

Wheeler has pulled off numerous stunts, pre-race shows, and also directed several renovations for the speedway to attract fans. His first major promotion came when a rivalry between well-known NASCAR driver Cale Yarborough and relative new-comer Darrell Waltrip began in 1977 during an accident in the 1977 Southern 500. In a post-race interview, Yarborough, who claimed he was wrecked by Waltrip, called Waltrip the derogatory nickname "Jaws". To promote the rivalry at the 1977 NAPA National 500, and in reference to both the rivalry and Yarborough's sponsor at the time, Holly Farms Poultry, Wheeler placed a dead chicken inside a shark's mouth and placed the contraption inside a car, parading the contraption around prior to the race's first round qualifying session.

After the incident, Wheeler made numerous promotions that gained notoriety and coverage in the local Charlotte media and the NASCAR industry. For the 1980 World 600, Wheeler hosted the "Great American Taxi Race", a race that featured 20 taxicab drivers. For the 1984 World 600, Wheeler staged a reenactment of Operation Urgent Fury, a United States invasion of Grenada that had occurred just a few months earlier. His last major promotion came at the 2007 Bank of America 500, when Wheeler announced the creation of an "all-you-can-eat" grandstand, where fans could pay for a buffet before and after the race.

Wheeler on occasion has attracted drivers to make one-off races throughout Wheeler's tenure as general manager of the speedway in hopes of attracting different demographics. In his first race as the general manager, the 1976 World 600, he convinced Janet Guthrie to enter the race as a promotion to attract more women spectators; at the time, only 15% of the speedway's spectators were women.

==== Unrealized promotions ====
Numerous promotions that Wheeler had created have been rejected or cancelled for various reasons. In 1980, Wheeler proposed a demolition derby featuring NFL players driving cars that were colored in their team's color. However, the NFL rejected the idea. In later years, a California filmmaker proposed a working flying saucer to fly over the racetrack in secrecy. While Wheeler initially wanted to go ahead with the promotion, he later relented after finding out that the Federal Aviation Administration and the Federal Bureau of Investigation would most likely investigate the saucer due to the promotion's secrecy.

At the 1978 World 600, Wheeler made an attempt at entering Willy T. Ribbs to attract more black fans to go to the speedway. However, the promotion went awry when the original crew chief that Ribbs was supposed to drive for, Harry Hyde, refused to give a car for Ribbs to drive. On May 15, Ribbs was caught by police going the wrong way down a one-way street. Ribbs decided to try and outrun the cops, eventually being caught at the gymnasium at Queens College. In jail, Ribbs called The Charlotte Observer writer Tom Higgins, to Wheeler's ire. After Ribbs paid a $27 (adjusted for inflation, $133) fine for his release that same day, he was missing from the track for the next two days, leading to Wheeler rejecting Ribbs' entry. As a result of Ribbs' absence, the team owner of the car that Ribbs was supposed to drive, Will Cronkite, replaced Ribbs with local North Carolinan short track driver Dale Earnhardt. In later interviews, Wheeler denied that he had attempted to bring in Ribbs as a way to promote the speedway.

An unrealized promotion that was Wheeler's stated "dream promotion" was a fight between a man and a shark on the frontstretch of the speedway, where one opponent must die in the fight for the other to be crowned the victor of the fight. Wheeler had proposed to bring in marathon swimmer and Gastonia, North Carolina, native Moon Huffstetler to kill a shark. The idea faced stiff opposition from former track presidents of the Atlanta Motor Speedway and the Texas Motor Speedway, Ed Clark and Eddie Gossage, respectively. Clark predicted that Huffstetler would either drown or be eaten by the shark. As a response, Wheeler suggested that Huffstetler should wear chain mail armor. When Wheeler suggested the promotion to Gossage in Wheeler's office, Gossage predicted that the animal rights group People for the Ethical Treatment of Animals (PETA) would heavily protest the event. Wheeler asked Gossage to hire fake demonstrators if PETA did not show up. After Gossage refused again, Wheeler angrily told Gossage to "get out of my office and figure it out".

== Legal issues and controversies ==
=== 1999 VisionAire 500K incident ===
On May 1, 1999, during the early laps of the scheduled 1999 VisionAire 500K race at the Charlotte Motor Speedway, an accident involving Stan Wattles and John Paul Jr. occurred on the speedway's front stretch. The crash resulted in heavy debris. The right rear wheel and tire assembly from Wattles' car was sent into the grandstands at high speeds, killing three people: Randy Pyatte, Dexter Mobley, and Jeffrey Patton. In addition, the debris injured eight more people, including a critically injured nine-year-old. After a lengthy caution period, the race was put under a red flag to stop the race and for Wheeler to determine if the race should continue. Wheeler decided to cancel the race due to the deaths, stating that "it was the only thing to do".

In the aftermath of the incident, Wheeler sent 20 goodwill ambassadors to help assist survivors of the incident. Among said tasks for the ambassadors were to buy groceries, give autographed merchandise, pay rent for survivors, and to record personal details that included mental, medical, and legal histories of the survivors, victims, and their families. The recording of personal details led to an investigation by Motor Racing Outreach on whether if lead ambassador chaplain Steve Green violated ethical standards. On May 19, Wheeler announced that the track's catch fence was revamped to prevent another occurrence of debris in the grandstands.

On May 28, the family of Dexter Mobley sued the Charlotte Motor Speedway, Humpy Wheeler, and the Indy Racing League for negligence concerning fan safety, with the family of Randy Pyatte also considering joining the lawsuit. By August 29, Pyatte's family had joined the lawsuit. On May 11, 2000, just over one year since the incident, the lawsuit was settled under a confidentiality agreement.

=== Charlotte Motor Speedway bridge collapse ===
After the 2000 The Winston ended, a pedestrian bridge that connected the Charlotte Motor Speedway to a nearby parking lot collapsed during a massive influx of fans using the bridge. An 80-foot (24 m) section of the bridge collapsed onto U.S. Route 29, sending pedestrians into a 17 feet (5.2 m) fall. Although no fatalities occurred, a total of 107 people were injured in the collapse. The immediate cause of the collapse that was given by both the speedway and North Carolina state officials was corroded steel cables on the bridge. When Wheeler was asked about the safety of the speedway, he stated, "[the collapse] is very concerning. But I'm not concerned about the safety of the place." Investigators later determined that the contractor used to build the bridge in 1995, the Tindall Corporation, had "used an improper additive to help the concrete filler at the bridge's center dry faster", which was later determined to be calcium chloride.

In the aftermath of the incident, a new bridge was built to replace the collapsed bridge that was completed in time for the 2000 UAW-GM Quality 500. In early 2003, Cindy and Marty Taylor, both injured in the collapse, sued the speedway and the Tindall Corporation for negligence during construction. The Tindall Corporation was found responsible, but not the speedway. Afterwards, around 50 lawsuits were filed against the speedway for negligence, with many of them being settled out of court. The few cases that were determined in court all determined that the speedway was not required to pay damages for fans who had filed lawsuits.

== In popular media ==
=== Films ===
Wheeler voice acted the role of Tex Dinoco, founder and CEO of fictional sponsor Dinoco in the 2006 animated film Cars. He landed Wheeler the role during pre-production in 2000 when Cars director John Lasseter visited the Charlotte Motor Speedway for the 2000 UAW-GM Quality 500. Lasseter, who liked Wheeler's voice, gave him the role of Tex. Wheeler recorded voice lines in 2004 and 2005. Wheeler reprised the role in 2017 for the film series' third installment, Cars 3.

=== Television shows ===
In 2008, Wheeler hosted a NASCAR discussion television series on the Speed Channel named The Humpy Show. The show was scheduled to feature Wheeler, one retired driver, and a current driver per each one-hour long episode discussing a certain current topic. The first episode premiered on February 12, and featured Buddy Baker and Kurt Busch. However, no new episodes came out after the premiere, although Wheeler announced that he was planning to make new episodes after his retirement in May of the same year.

Wheeler appeared in the season three finale of American Pickers, an American television show that is dedicated to the restoration of old Americana artifacts. In the episode, Wheeler donated several items from his personal collection of memorabilia to the NASCAR Hall of Fame.

== Personal life and death ==
Wheeler married Patricia Adele Williams on May 12, 1962, in Charlotte, North Carolina. Humpy and Patricia had three children: Patti, Tracy, and Trip. The family used to live in a lakefront home in Mountain Island Lake, having moved there in the late 1990s from Lake Norman. The family moved to SouthPark, Charlotte, in 2019. In 2020, the former residence on Mountain Island Lake sold for $3.4 million.

Wheeler was raised Catholic and remained devoted to his faith throughout his life.

Wheeler died on August 20, 2025, in Charlotte, North Carolina, aged 86.

== Legacy and honors ==
Throughout his tenure as general manager at the Charlotte Motor Speedway, he was known as a promoter who pulled off unique, extravagant, and action-packed promotions, with Wheeler being named the "P. T. Barnum of NASCAR" by some industry leaders and the NASCAR media. Former president of NASCAR, Mike Helton, stated that Wheeler took promotion "to a new level". Eddie Gossage, once an employee under Wheeler who later became the president of the Texas Motor Speedway, stated that Wheeler had a "vital role in shaping [NASCAR]... I know that I am a far better promoter as a result of being a graduate of 'Humpy University.'" Scott Fowler, writer for The Charlotte Observer, described Wheeler as a "one-of-a-kind showman" for his promotions at Charlotte Motor Speedway.

=== Smith–Wheeler rivalry, comments on NASCAR's decline ===
Early tensions with Bruton Smith, the head of Speedway Motorsports (SMI), the company that owned the Charlotte Motor Speedway, were documented as early as 1991. In 1991, Wheeler wrote a private letter to Smith, stating that a relentless pace of expansion and work done on the speedway had burnt out the speedway's executives and had begun straining employees' relationships with their families. According to Wheeler, while the two had been lifelong friends, they had found themselves in "constant disagreement".

On May 21, 2008, Wheeler announced an abrupt retirement from his position as president of the Charlotte Motor Speedway after the 2008 Coca-Cola 600 race weekend and announced that he would no longer be affiliated with the speedway, a decision that was seen as a shock to most of the NASCAR landscape. Wheeler was replaced by Marcus G. Smith, Bruton Smith's son. Wheeler stated that the decision was sudden, and that he had hoped for a part-time position with the track. Smith stated that he had offered Wheeler a consulting job. Both Smith and Wheeler have disputing views on the terms of the retirement. Smith stated that he retired on his own will, stating in 2009, "I think I've seen or heard that made it seem like he was terminated or something. He retired on his own will. Period. Period. Period." Wheeler, however, stated that while some aspects of his retirement were on his terms, not all aspects of his retirement were.

By July 2008, the stock price of SMI had plummeted by over 50% since November 2007, with a noticeable steep decline during the months after Wheeler's departure. Smith did not invite Wheeler to the 2009 Coca-Cola 600 race weekend, further straining tensions between the two. In 2010, Wheeler stated that he had left his position due to the initiation of new projects on the speedway that were started by Smith without Wheeler's knowledge. Among said projects were a new office space behind Wheeler's personal office, the construction of the zMax Dragway, and the cancellation of a campgrounds site on the speedway. In 2012, Wheeler stated that he was "at war" with Smith again, arguing over who had created the idea to install lights at the Charlotte Motor Speedway.

In 2012, Wheeler stated that modern NASCAR drivers had "lost touch" with core audience of NASCAR, feeling that drivers had become too clean and corporate. The next year, Wheeler made comments on NASCAR's declining popularity on his personal YouTube channel. In a video, Wheeler stated that he believed the entire industry of stock car racing had become too expensive, preventing hopeful drivers with lower incomes from ever competing. In addition, he believed that ever since the mainstream rise of NASCAR that started in the 1990s, corporate sponsors had prevented drivers from having extravagant personalities, such as ones of Darrell Waltrip and Dale Earnhardt. By 2014, Wheeler admitted that although some things had changed, he still felt that there were a lack of personalities. However, he did react positively to changes around the entertainment aspect of the sport, including the new addition of the NASCAR playoffs and the work of then-NASCAR CEO Brian France. He stated, "Brian has made very good decisions lately... The new Chase format gets rid of points days, and nobody's ever bought a ticket to see a points race. No more fucking around and talking about how finishing sixth was a great points day." In 2017, during a span that had NASCAR oversee steep declines in attendance and television ratings, Wheeler stated that believed a new aerodynamics package, along with his constant belief of a wider span of personalities, could help NASCAR recover from its decline.

In 2020, Wheeler decided to make an attempt to cool down tension with Smith by visiting Smith's house. Wheeler stated that he had missed Smith, stating that "we were like brothers, and I missed the debates". Smith greeted Wheeler with a friendly attitude, and the two reconnected, ending over 12 years of tension. After Smith's death in 2022, Wheeler wrote an op-ed for The Charlotte Observer on June 30 that praised Smith, with Wheeler stating that "in the 60 years I have known Bruton, I found no man smarter... there were few like him".

=== Recognition ===
- Wheeler was inducted into the Carolinas Boxing Hall of Fame in 1992.
- Wheeler was inducted into the North Carolina Sports Hall of Fame in 2004.
- Wheeler was inducted into the International Motorsports Hall of Fame in 2006.
- Wheeler was inducted into the Motorsports Hall of Fame of America in 2009.
- Wheeler was awarded the Achievement in Motorsports Tribute Award from the North Carolina Motorsports Industry in 2013.
- Wheeler was given an honorary doctorate from Belmont Abbey College, his father's alma mater, in 2019.

== Bibliography ==
- Growing Up NASCAR: Racing's Most Outrageous Promoter Tells All (Motorbooks, 2010). ISBN 978-0760337752
