= 1999 VisionAire 500K =

Cancelled motor race in Charlotte, North Carolina

(United States) 1999 VisionAire 500K
Race details
- The layout of Lowe's Motor Speedway
- Date: May 1, 1999
- Official name: VisionAire 500K
- Location: Lowe's Motor Speedway, Concord, North Carolina, United States
- Course: Permanent racing facility 1.500 mi / 2.414 km
- Distance: 79 laps 118.500 mi / 190.707 km
- Scheduled Distance: 208 laps 312.000 mi / 502.115 km

Pole position
- Driver: (United States) Greg Ray (Team Menard)
- Time: 24.320

Podium
- First: N/A
- Second: N/A
- Third: N/A

The 1999 VisionAire 500K was a Pep Boys Indy Racing League open-wheel race that was held on May 1, 1999, at Lowe's Motor Speedway in Concord, North Carolina. It was scheduled to be the third round of the 1999 Pep Boys Indy Racing League and the third running of the event, with a distance of 208 laps.

The race was cancelled after 79 laps had been run due to an accident on lap 62 involving Stan Wattles and John Paul Jr. resulted in debris, including the right-rear wheel assembly of Wattles' car, being launched into the stands and killing three spectators.

== Background ==
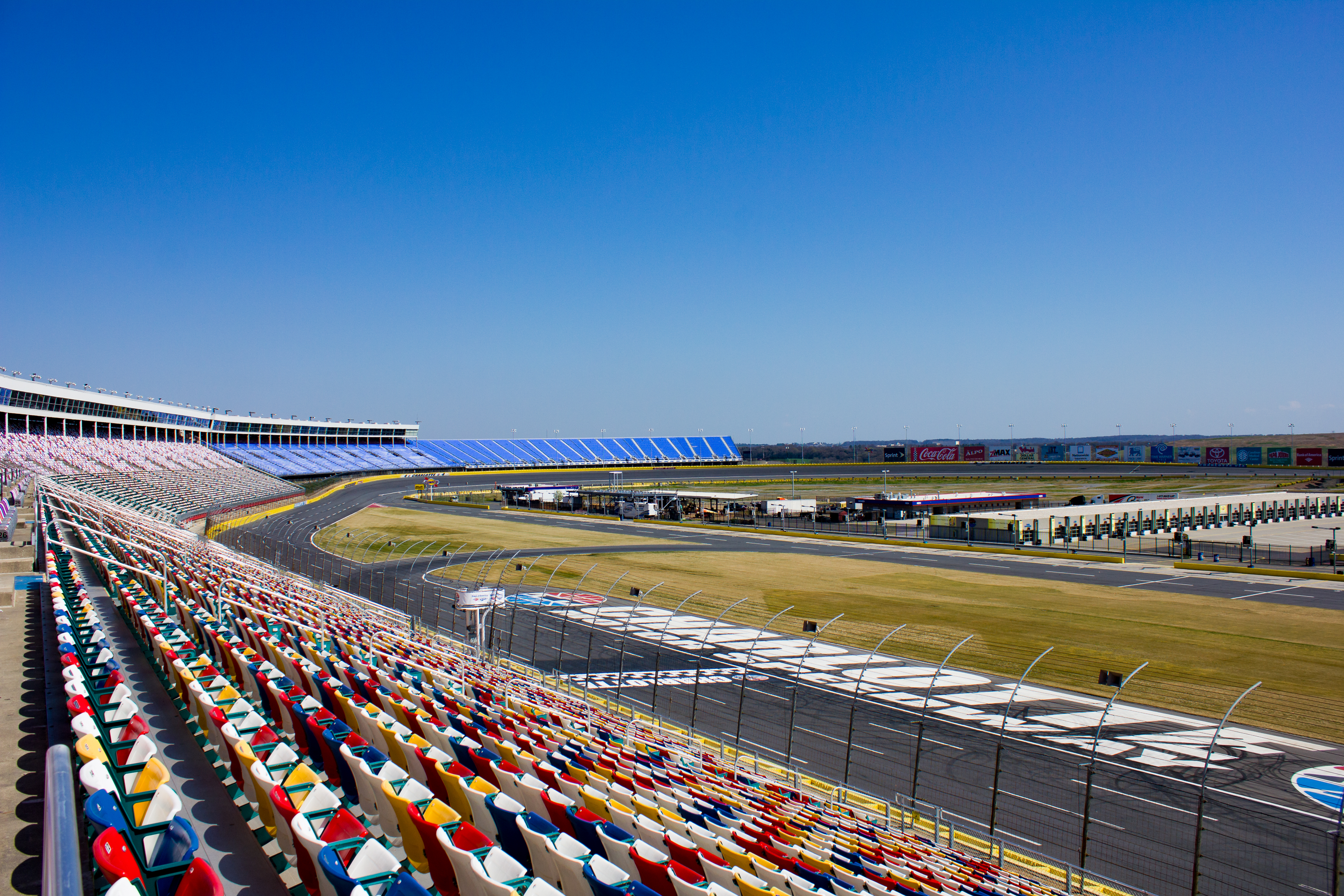
Lowe's Motor Speedway (pictured in 2012), where the race was held.

The VisionAire 500K was introduced to the Indy Racing League (IRL)'s schedule in 1997 as an attempt by IRL president Tony George to attract NASCAR fans to his series. It took place at Lowe's Motor Speedway, a four-turn, 1.5 mi (2.4 km) quad-oval circuit that features 24-degree banking in the corners and five-degree banking in the front stretch and back stretch. The third edition of the event was to be held on May 1, 1999, differing from the previous two editions which were held in July, and contested over a distance of 208 laps and 312 miles (502 km). It was the third of 11 scheduled open-wheel races for the 1999 Pep Boys Indy Racing League. Kenny Bräck was the defending race winner.

Heading into the event, Scott Goodyear of Panther Racing led the Drivers' Championship with 93 points, 18 more than second-place Jeff Ward. Eddie Cheever was third on 63 points, while Scott Sharp and Mark Dismore rounded out the top five with 61 and 56 points, respectively. As for the Engine Manufacturers' Championship, Oldsmobile led with 22 points and Nissan trailed by eight. Dallara and G-Force were tied for the Chassis Manufacturers' Championship on 17 points, with Riley & Scott (10 points) standing third.

== Media coverage ==
The race was carried on national television by Speedvision. Dave Calabro served as the lap-by-lap announcer, with Jack Arute and Arie Luyendyk as the analysts. Vince Welch and Calvin Fish reported from pit road.

== Report ==
=== Qualifying ===
The start of the qualifying session was delayed for an hour due to localized heavy rain that fell in the preceding four days. Despite failing pre-qualifying inspection for his car running too low to the ground, which allowed him to run only one qualifying lap as opposed to the usual two, Greg Ray rebounded to score the pole position, his second consecutive pole of the season. Steve Knapp failed to qualify.

=== Race ===
The air temperature at the start of the race was 65 °F (18 °C), with 20 mph (32 km/h) winds from the northeast. Mark Wingler, Indy Racing League chaplain, began pre-race ceremonies with an invocation. Singer Katherine Parrott performed the national anthem, and actor Cliff Robertson commanded the drivers to start their engines. Just as the green flag was waved to start the race after the pace laps, Robby Unser lost control of his car leaving the fourth turn but avoided sustaining damage. Tyce Carlson and Davey Hamilton then made contact and went into the infield grass, causing the first caution. Carlson retired from the race because of his involvement in the accident. During the caution, Hamilton made a pit stop to allow his team to repair the left-hand side of his vehicle, but was later pushed into the garage and into retirement.

The race was restarted on the ninth lap, with Ray leading Sharp. Five laps later, Jeff Ward overtook Scott Goodyear for third between turns three and four, and passed Scott Sharp on the high banking of the fourth turn for second on the 18th lap. By the 19th lap, Goodyear fell to seventh position. Lazier progressed to third place by lap 25, and he overtook Ward on the low side of between the first and second turns for second two laps later. Ward made two pit stops on laps 29 for fuel and tires and to replace a broken front anti-roll bar on the 36th lap. On lap 39, the second caution was waved for an accident. Unser lost control of his car in the second turn, and struck the retaining barrier on the back straightaway. Several drivers made pit stops for fuel, tires and car adjustments during the caution. Buddy Lazier was first to exit pit road and maintained the lead at the restart on lap 47. Two laps later, Ray retook the lead with a pass on the inside of Lazier leaving turn four. Lazier returned to first place when he overtook Ray on the high banking of turn two on the 50th lap.

On lap 62, Stan Wattles crashed after suffering a suspension failure. John Paul Jr. made contact with debris from Wattles' car, sending the latter's right rear wheel and tire assembly into the grandstands. Scott Harrington also spun in the incident. Three spectators were killed by the flying debris, while an additional eight suffered non-fatal injuries. Following the incident, the race was put under caution for 17 laps. Due to the fatalities, the race was abandoned after 79 of the scheduled 208 laps; Ray had been leading at the time of the stoppage. Track president Humpy Wheeler stated: "We've never done anything like this before. But it seemed like the right thing to do in respect to those who lost their lives up there." Driver Eddie Cheever Jr. agreed with the decision to stop the race, saying, "My teammates and I are just full of sorrow. Our thoughts and prayers are with the individuals and families. The decision to stop the race was the right one. We all leave Charlotte with extremely heavy hearts."

As a result of the race being abandoned, no official prize money or championship points (aside from qualifying points) were awarded. The IRL instead paid each team and driver to cover the expenses occurred for the race. In the aftermath of the accident and a similar accident at CART's U.S. 500 at Michigan in July 1998, several safety improvements were made to the IRL racecars and the track. The IRL added tethers to the wheels of their cars in an effort to prevent them from detaching, while Lowe's Motor Speedway raised the height of the track's catchfence from 15 to 21 feet. Unlike the FIA Code, which uses three laps (since then changed to three green flag laps as of 2022) to count as an official race, INDYCAR requires a race to go to halfway (in this case, 105 laps) or force majeure to be an official race. As such, INDYCAR does not currently recognize any records related to the event, and omitted the event in its count for the 100th race celebration in 2004.

INDYCAR did not return to the track until Josef Newgarden ran demonstration laps on the road course during the NASCAR Charlotte Road Course round during the 2019 NASCAR playoffs after qualifying.

=== Aftermath ===
==== Sports Illustrated photo of the incident ====
Two weeks after the incident, a controversy boiled at the 1999 Indianapolis 500 after Sports Illustrated published an article by Ed Hinton, entitled "Fatal Attractions: More fan deaths put the focus on the need for safety innovations" in its May 10 issue. The article discussed the tragedy and proposed safety improvements discussed in its aftermath. The magazine's editors in New York published the article accompanied by an AP photograph taken at the scene. The photo featured a security guard standing next to two dead bodies in the grandstands covered with bloody sheets, and blood covering the steps. The photo drew the ire of the Indianapolis Motor Speedway president Tony George, and they pulled Hinton's credentials for the 1999 Indy 500. After a few days, the credentials were restored, when it was determined that Hinton was unaware of the photo published along with his article, and when free speech/censorship issues were raised.

==== Bombings of Lowe's stores ====
Later in the year, a short series of bombings took place in Lowe's stores in North Carolina, injuring three, and prompting some to think there may be a link with a relative of one of the victims. When George Rocha was arrested for the bombings, he claimed that he was angry about the crash at the speedway, but he later confessed that it was retribution for being caught shoplifting and an attempt at extortion.
