= NASCAR Sportsman Division (1989–1995) =

American car racing series

- Category: Stock cars
- Country: United States
- Inaugural season: 1989
- Folded: 1996

The NASCAR Sportsman Division is a discontinued NASCAR division. It was created by Humpy Wheeler in 1989 to give short track drivers superspeedway experience.

== History ==
=== 1989 ===
In 1989, Humpy Wheeler, the president of Charlotte Motor Speedway, announced the creation of the Sportsman Division, a series in which drivers from short tracks could gain experience on superspeedways. The first Sportsman race was held after qualifying for the 1989 Coca-Cola 600, and was mostly clean. The race was won by Tim Bender.

=== 1990 ===
In 1990, the series' first fatality occurred. During practice, David Gaines and two other drivers were involved in an accident coming off of turn 4. As Steve McEachern came through the turn, he was unable to avoid David Gaines, and struck his car, killing him. McEachern flipped into the grass and came to rest on the grass next to pit road. That race was won by Robbie Faggart.

=== 1991 ===
During a Sportsman race at Charlotte in May of that year, Ed Gartner Jr. was t-boned by Tom D'Eath. Gartner cracked his sternum and fractured his leg, and D'Eath, a nationally renowned hydroplane racing champion who won the APBA national championship and Gold Cup events, best known for piloting Bernie Little's Miss Budweiser, broke his neck. Another severe crash that month took place at Charlotte Motor Speedway, when Philip Ross' car spun coming out of turn 4 and backed into the Armco pit guardrail. When the fuel cell was split by the Armco, the car burst into flames. Luckily, Ross got out of the car, but suffered second-degree burns over 30% of his body. At the end of the 1991 season, the Armco guardrail on pit wall was replaced with a concrete barrier.

The Sportsman Division replaced New Hampshire with Pocono at the end of the year. The first race there was aired on ESPN, and was won by Kirk Shelmerdine.

=== 1992 ===
In 1992, the series was renamed the Igloo Sportsman Challenge and began awarding a points based championship. In the qualifying race for the Winston 100, however, the series' second fatality occurred. Red Everette and a few other drivers spun coming out of Turn 4, and Neil Connell, who had driven high to avoid the accident, came into contact with Gary Batson, who was forced onto his driver's side door and dragged along the wall. The two cars caught fire when they came to a stop. Connell managed to escape his car, but Batson was trapped due to being on his driver's side. Batson's car had previously been involved in the previous fiery crash in October 1991 with Phillip Ross. He suffered burns to 80% of his body, including third-degree burns. He died the next morning. Meanwhile, the Winston 100 feature aired on TV just before the NASCAR All-Star Race VIII. That race was won by Robbie Faggart, who went on to win the championship.

=== 1993 ===
After 1992, the series lost sponsorship from Igloo. The opening race almost went green the whole way until a heavy late race crash between Shari Minter, Kirk Shelmerdine, and a few others ended the race under caution. There were no major injuries in 1993, but the second race of the season, the Goody’s 100, saw a large second lap pileup caused by Peter Gibbons and another hard multi car crash later in the race when Russell Phillips got loose. After that race, the series began doing single file starts and restarts because the drivers didn't have enough experience for two wide restarts on big tracks, and the next 2 races went caution free.

=== 1994 ===
In one race, Red Everette was t-boned by Ronnie Sewell. Everette's car burst into flames and Everette suffered mild burns to his face. Later in that same race, an axle from a wrecked car flew into the pits, injuring two pit crew members. Driver Wally Fowler was very competitive that season, winning two races but being stripped of his wins after failing qualifying.

=== 1995 ===
By 1995, there were fewer competitors, and until October, it wasn't a very violent year for the series, much like 1993. On October 4, 1995, the Sportsman 100 was supposed to be run, but due to weather, the race was postponed to October 6. The race was then run, with 26-year old Russell Phillips on the pole. On lap 17 of the 67 laps scheduled, Phillips was killed in one of the most gruesome crashes in motor sports history. The crash took safety officials approximately 40 minutes to clean up, and the race continued. The race was won by Gary Laton. The race was filmed and was supposed to be broadcast on delay, but out of respect for Phillips, it was never aired. The crash caused Humpy Wheeler to cancel the Sportsman Division at Charlotte. The other tracks, like Pocono and Richmond, followed suit.

=== 1996 ===
While Humpy and Charlotte were done with the series, it wasn't completely over yet. It ran less than five races on short tracks that year. The point of the series was to get short track drivers on superspeedways, so the series was rendered pointless, because all the big tracks stopped hosting Sportsman races after Phillips' fatal crash. By the end of 1996, the Sportsman Division was gone for good.

The Sportsman Division became the roots of the current CARS Tour, a short track series, as they used steel bodied old Cup and second tier cars initially as the Hooters ProCup.

== Cars ==
The series used former Cup/Busch series cars that were mainly run from the mid-1980s to early 1990s, and the year range for eligible cars grew each year. The wheelbase and tires were the same as the cars from the mid-1980s to 1990, using a single two venturi (metering) carburetor instead of the four venturi variant used in the major series, reducing the horsepower from 700 to 350, similar to what is used in NASCAR-sanctioned short track racing.

== Notable drivers ==
- Tim Bender
- Ward Burton (m)
- Tom D'Eath (MSHOF 2000)
- Robbie Faggart
- Robert Huffman
- Jason Keller (w)
- Dennis Setzer (w)
- Kirk Shelmerdine (h)
- Jack Sprague (n)

(h) denotes a NASCAR Hall of Fame member, primarily for his work as a crew chief. (m) denotes a driver who won a NASCAR Cup Series major. (n) denotes a NASCAR national series champion. (w) denoted a NASCAR national series race winner.
