= Patti Wheeler =

American television executive

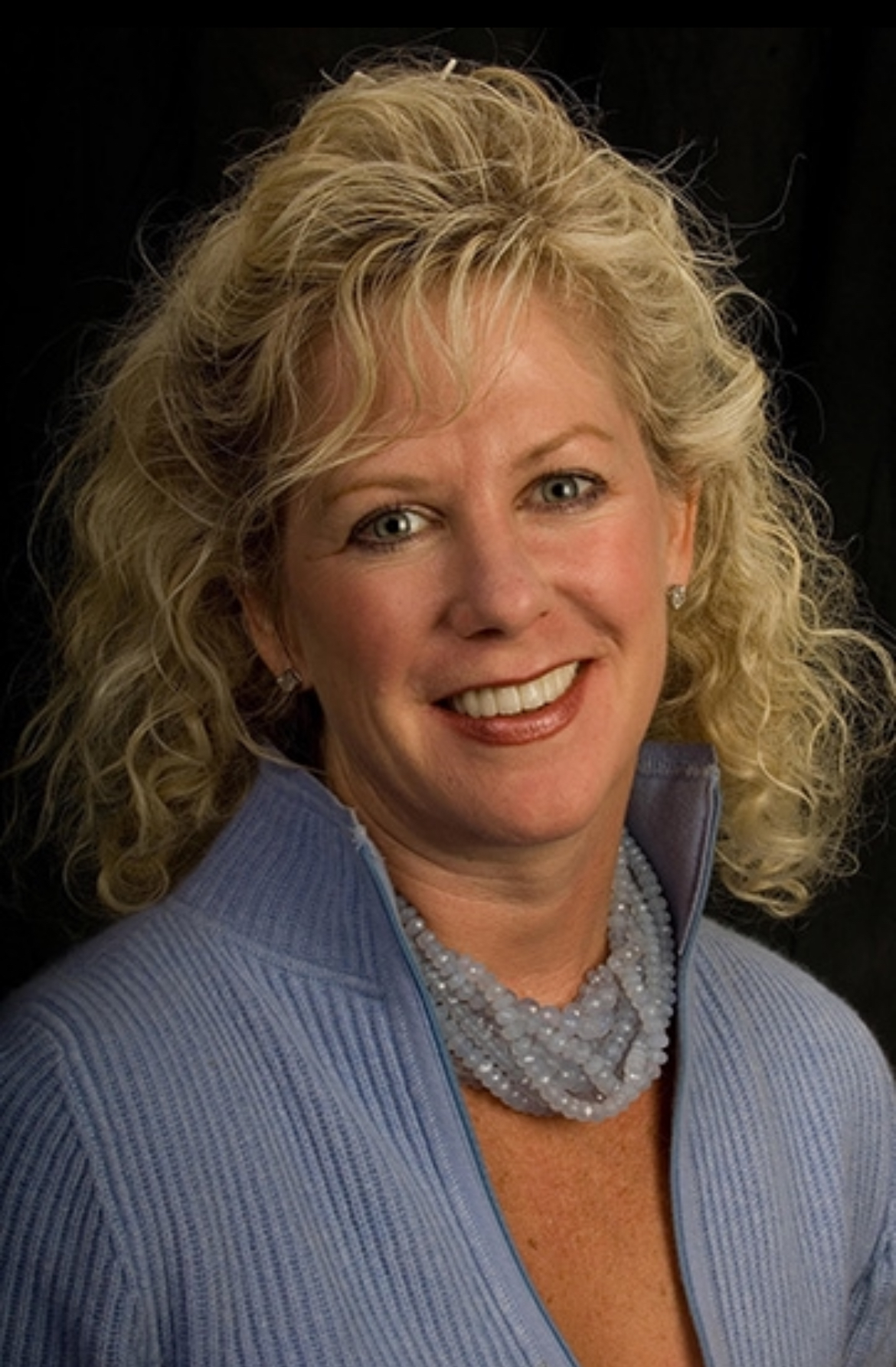
- Patti Wheeler
- Born: June 11, 1963; Charlotte, North Carolina, U.S.

Patti Wheeler is an American retired sports media executive who retired as senior executive vice president of Speed, the 24-hour motorsports cable network owned by Fox Sports, in 2012.

== Career ==
At Speed, Wheeler was responsible for all programming and production for the network, including live NASCAR, Formula One, IMSA, MotoGP, among many others, and dozens of news, documentary, and special interest series and specials.

Prior to that Wheeler was the founder and owner of Wheeler Television, Inc., from 2001 to 2010, producing live event coverage of NASCAR, the American Le Mans Series and World of Outlaws along with many series including RaceDay, Monster Trucks, and Totally NASCAR.

From 1994 to 2001 Wheeler was President of World Sports Enterprises (WSE), which was founded by Ken Squier and Fred Rheinstein and based out of Concord, North Carolina. During her tenure, WSE was the largest motorsports production company in the world.

In 1991, Wheeler was Director of Motorsports and Executive Producer for The Nashville Network's motorsports department, overseeing an exponential growth in motorsports, particularly NASCAR programming.

Prior to that, Wheeler was a live event, news and documentary producer, director and writer for World Sports Enterprises based out of Atlanta and specializing in motorsports television.

== Early life and education ==
Wheeler was born in Charlotte, North Carolina June 11, 1963. She is the daughter of former Lowe's Motor Speedway President and General Manager Humpy Wheeler.

Wheeler earned a bachelor's degree in English from Belmont Abbey College in 1986.

== Personal life ==
Wheeler was married to Leo Hindery Jr. and has two children.

== Awards and recognition ==
- NASCAR's Top 25 Most Powerful People – Charlotte Observer
- Racing's Most Influential: Television Executives – Racer magazine
- Top Forty Under Forty – Charlotte Business Journal
- Top 25 Women In Business Award – Charlotte Business Journal

== Sources ==
- "Patti Wheeler". nascar.com.
- "BELMONT ABBEY COLLEGE BOARD OF ADVISORS". alumni.belmontabbeycollege.edu.
