= Russell Phillips =

NASCAR driver (1969-1995)

- Born: March 6, 1969 Mint Hill, North Carolina, U.S.
- Died: October 6, 1995 (aged 26) Charlotte, North Carolina, U.S.

NASCAR Sportsman Division
- Years active: 1990–1995
- Teams: Buick, Chevrolet, Oldsmobile
- Starts: 15
- Wins: 0
- Poles: 1

Russell Lee Phillips (March 6, 1969 — October 6, 1995) was an American NASCAR Sportsman Division driver. He was killed in a crash at Charlotte Motor Speedway in 1995.

== Personal life ==
Phillips graduated from Independence High School in Mint Hill in 1987 before working for his father's truck equipment company. After competing in short tracks across the Carolinas, he moved to NASCAR's Sportsman Division. He also worked as a fabricator, volunteer firefighter, and preacher. He also volunteered at a local racing school occasionally and was a devout Baptist, serving as the youth minister at his local church, serving as a mentor for many of the children there. He was nicknamed “Bubby” due to his large, intimidating stature. By all reports, he was an extremely kind man, sometimes referred to as a gentle giant.

Phillips was married to Jennifer, a young woman he met on pit road in 1990 before one of his races while she was looking for autographs. They lived together in Mint Hill, North Carolina, and had no children.

== Career ==
While little is known about his career, it is known that Phillips independently owned and drove the No. 57 car. Most of his career, he was a middle of the pack driver and hardly got attention from the media, but he started making a name for himself in 1995 with strong runs. His best finish was an 8th place finish in 1993. He received sponsorship from local companies such as Mullis Well Drilling, Quesco, and later in his career, Hendrix Business Systems.

== Death ==
The 1995 Winston 100 at Charlotte was the 15th series start for Phillips, who entered the race having just won his first pole position after setting a lap speed of 157.444 miles per hour (253.382 km/h). Phillips led the first two laps of the race before falling back through the field.

The crash occurred on lap 17 of the 67-lap event. Phillips was in tenth place when his Oldsmobile was hit by the car of Steven Howard, who steered high to avoid a two-car spinout on the apron in turn 4. Howard's car forced Phillips' car onto its right side, then smashed it roof-first into the retaining wall, killing him instantly. Until 1996, NASCAR cars were not required to be equipped with the "Earnhardt bar", a roof-support bar running down the middle of the windshield, designed to prevent fatal roof collapse in roof-first accidents. His roll bars failed to protect the roof and, as Phillips’ car was dragged along the catch fence, both the roll bars and the roof itself were sheared completely off the car, exposing the interior of the driver compartment and grinding Phillips and the compartment against the wall and fence. The two cars slid along the fence for about 100 feet (30 m) before Phillips’ car flipped back onto its wheels and the two cars slid into the grass. There was a massive "gaping hole" where the roof had been.

Phillips, whose body was mutilated by the track's steel catch fence and a caution light fixture at high speed, was both dismembered and decapitated, in what a photographer on-scene described, "as gruesome a wreck as I can ever recall". In video footage taken at the scene of the accident, the first rescuer is initially shown running to the car, then immediately turning away after seeing Phillips' body and realizing the hopelessness of any attempt at resuscitation. The track was littered with debris, blood, and several body parts, necessitating a lengthy red flag period while track officials cleared the track.

The race resumed after a 40-minute red flag. Track president Humpy Wheeler elected not to cancel the event, citing Phillips' wreck as a "freak deal."

=== Changes after the accident ===
Phillips' death resulted in a serious debate about roll cage design practices, construction methods and inspection techniques applied to NASCAR Limited Sportsman Division cars. In 1996, a roof reinforcement that had a bar running down the windshield from the roof to the hood of the car was made mandatory on all NASCAR vehicles. It was called the Earnhardt bar after Dale Earnhardt was seriously injured in a crash at Talladega in the DieHard 500. Charlotte Motor Speedway also withdrew from the Sportsman Division in 1996, following three deaths in six years, citing Phillips' death as "the last straw".
