= Robbie Faggart =

American former stock car racing driver

- Born: November 24, 1960 (age 65); Concord, North Carolina, U.S.
- Achievements: 1992 NASCAR Igloo Sportsman Series Champion

NASCAR O'Reilly Auto Parts Series career
- 16 races run over 4 years
- Best finish: 51st (1987)
- First race: 1987 Budweiser 200 (Bristol)
- Last race: 2002 Carquest Auto Parts 300 (Charlotte)
| Wins | Top tens | Poles |
|---|---|---|
| 0 | 0 | 0 |

Robbie Faggart (born November 24, 1960) is an American former stock car racing driver. He competed in the NASCAR Sportsman Division in the early 1990s, winning the series' 1992 championship; he saw less success in NASCAR's top divisions, failing to qualify for seven Winston Cup Series races before running a limited schedule in the NASCAR Busch Series in the early 2000s.

== Career ==
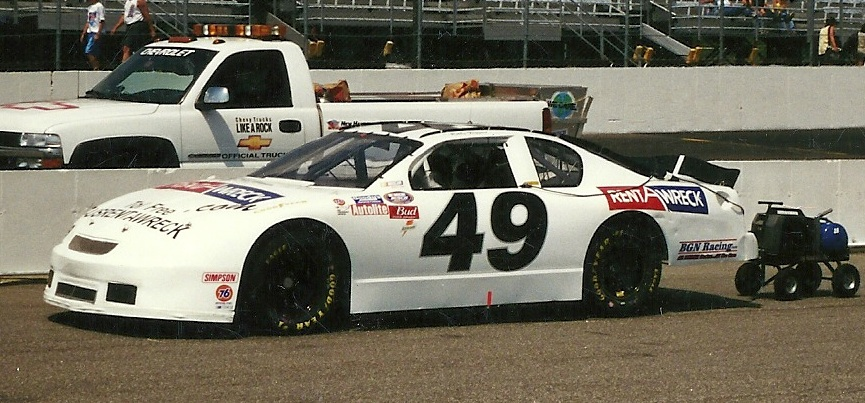
Faggart's 2001 Busch Series car

Faggart raced in the NASCAR Goody's Dash Series during the 1980s, winning several races, before moving to the Sportsman Division, later the Igloo Sportsman Series, in 1990, running it until the series closed in 1995. He established himself as a winning driver in the Sportsman Division, winning both in the series itself and also in local Late Model competition in the early 1990s; in 1992, he won two Sportsman Series races at Charlotte Motor Speedway within the span of five days, going on to win the series championship; it was the first season in which the series had awarded a points title.

Faggart attempted to qualify for seven Winston Cup Series races during his career, but never made the field for a race in NASCAR's top division. He did compete in the Winston Open, a preliminary event for NASCAR's All-Star race, with his best run coming in 1996, where he qualified seventh and ran in the top-five for part of the race before suffering engine failure and finishing 31st. He ran a limited schedule in the NASCAR Busch Series over several years; he ran a few events in the late 1980s and late 1990s, then competed in eleven races for Jay Robinson Racing in 2001, his most in a year. His career-best finish was nineteenth in 1997 at Charlotte Motor Speedway. His final start in the series came in 2002, at Charlotte Motor Speedway in May; it was his final start in top-level NASCAR competition.

== Motorsports career results ==
=== NASCAR ===
(key) (Bold – Pole position awarded by qualifying time. Italics – Pole position earned by points standings or practice time. * – Most laps led.)

==== Winston Cup Series ====
NASCAR Winston Cup Series results
| Year | Team | No. | Make | 1 | 2 | 3 | 4 | 5 | 6 | 7 | 8 | 9 | 10 | 11 | 12 | 13 | 14 | 15 | 16 | 17 | 18 | 19 | 20 | 21 | 22 | 23 | 24 | 25 | 26 | 27 | 28 | 29 | 30 | 31 | NWCC | Pts | Ref |
|---|---|---|---|---|---|---|---|---|---|---|---|---|---|---|---|---|---|---|---|---|---|---|---|---|---|---|---|---|---|---|---|---|---|---|---|---|---|
| 1991 | Faggart Racing | 76 | Chevy | DAY | RCH | CAR | ATL | DAR | BRI | NWS | MAR | TAL | CLT | DOV | SON | POC | MCH | DAY | POC | TAL | GLN | MCH | BRI | DAR | RCH | DOV | MAR | NWS | CLT; DNQ | CAR | PHO | ATL | | | N/A | 0 | |
| 1996 | Miles Motorsports | 02 | Chevy | DAY | CAR | RCH; DNQ | ATL | DAR; DNQ | BRI | NWS | MAR | TAL | SON | CLT; DNQ | DOV | POC | MCH | DAY | NHA | POC | TAL | IND; DNQ | GLN | MCH | BRI | DAR; DNQ | RCH | DOV | MAR | NWS | CLT; DNQ | CAR | PHO | ATL | N/A | 0 | |

==== Busch Series ====
NASCAR Busch Series results
| Year | Team | No. | Make | 1 | 2 | 3 | 4 | 5 | 6 | 7 | 8 | 9 | 10 | 11 | 12 | 13 | 14 | 15 | 16 | 17 | 18 | 19 | 20 | 21 | 22 | 23 | 24 | 25 | 26 | 27 | 28 | 29 | 30 | 31 | 32 | 33 | 34 | NBSC | Pts | Ref |
|---|---|---|---|---|---|---|---|---|---|---|---|---|---|---|---|---|---|---|---|---|---|---|---|---|---|---|---|---|---|---|---|---|---|---|---|---|---|---|---|---|
| 1987 | | 40 | Olds | DAY | HCY | MAR | DAR | BRI; 21 | LGY | SBO | CLT | DOV | IRP | OCS | JFC | OXF | SBO | HCY | RAL | LGY | OCS | BRI | JFC | DAR; 34 | RCH | DOV | MAR | CLT | CAR | MAR | | | | | | | | 51st | 170 | |
| 1997 | Mark III Motorsports | 76 | Chevy | DAY | CAR | RCH | ATL | LVS | DAR | HCY | TEX | BRI | NSV | TAL | NHA | NZH | CLT | DOV | SBO | GLN | MLW | MYB | GTY | IRP | MCH | BRI | DAR | RCH | DOV | CLT; 19 | CAL | CAR | HOM | | | | | 90th | 106 | |
| 1999 | Mark III Motorsports | 78 | Chevy | DAY | CAR | LVS | ATL | DAR | TEX | NSV | BRI | TAL | CAL | NHA | RCH | NZH | CLT | DOV | SBO | GLN | MLW | MYB | PPR | GTY | IRP | MCH | BRI | DAR | RCH | DOV | CLT; Wth | CAR | MEM | PHO | HOM | | | N/A | 0 | |
| 2001 | Jay Robinson Racing | 49 | Ford | DAY | CAR; 35 | LVS | ATL | DAR | BRI | TEX; 42 | NSH | TAL | CAL; 35 | RCH | | | | DOV | KEN | MLW; 28 | GLN | CHI; 33 | GTY; 36 | PPR; 37 | IRP | MCH | BRI | DAR | | | | | | | | | | 52nd | 632 | |
| 2001 | Jay Robinson Racing | 49 | Chevy | | | | | | | | | | | | NHA; 34 | NZH; 31 | CLT; 38 | | | | | | | | | | | | | | | | | | | | | 52nd | 632 | |
| 2001 | PF2 Motorsports | 97 | Chevy | | | | | | | | | | | | | | | | | | | | | | | | | | RCH; DNQ | DOV | KAN | | | | | | | 52nd | 632 | |
| 2001 | PF2 Motorsports | 94 | Chevy | | | | | | | | | | | | | | | | | | | | | | | | | | | | | CLT; 38 | MEM | PHO | CAR | HOM | | 52nd | 632 | |
| 2002 | Jay Robinson Racing | 49 | Chevy | DAY | CAR; 35 | LVS | DAR | BRI | TEX | NSH | TAL | CAL | RCH | NHA | NZH | CLT; 34 | DOV | NSH | KEN | MLW | DAY | CHI | GTY | PPR | IRP | MCH | BRI | DAR | RCH | DOV | KAN | CLT | MEM | ATL | CAR | PHX | HOM | 94th | 119 | |

=== CARS Super Late Model Tour ===
(key)

CARS Super Late Model Tour results
| Year | Team | No. | Make | 1 | 2 | 3 | 4 | 5 | 6 | 7 | 8 | 9 | 10 | CSLMTC | Pts | Ref |
|---|---|---|---|---|---|---|---|---|---|---|---|---|---|---|---|---|
| 2015 | Kyle Beattie | 24 | N/A | SNM | ROU | HCY | SNM | TCM | MMS | ROU | CON; 19 | MYB | HCY | 60th | 14 | |
