= Charlotte Motor Speedway =

Motorsport track in North Carolina, United States

America's Home for Racing
- Location: 5555 Concord Parkway South; Concord, North Carolina, United States; 28027
- Coordinates: 35°21′09″N 80°40′57″W
- Capacity: 95,000
- Owner: Speedway Motorsports (1974, 1976–present)
- Broke ground: 28 July 1959; 67 years ago
- Opened: 15 June 1960; 66 years ago
- Construction cost: US$2 million
- Former names: Lowe's Motor Speedway (1999–2009)
- Major events: Current: NASCAR Cup Series; Coca-Cola 600 (1960–present); Bank of America 400 (1960–2017, 2020, 2026); Bank of America Roval 400 (2018–2025); NASCAR All-Star Race (1985, 1987–2019); NASCAR O'Reilly Auto Parts Series; Charbroil 300 (1982–present); Blue Cross NC 300 (1978–2018, 2026); Blue Cross NC 250 (roval) (2018–2025); NASCAR Truck Series; North Carolina Education Lottery 200 (2003–present); Ecosave 200 (2026–present); Ecosave 250 (roval) (2025); Former: IMSA SportsCar Championship; Grand Prix of Charlotte (1971, 1974, 1982–1986, 2000, 2020); IMSA Ford Mustang Challenge (2025); Pirelli World Challenge (2000, 2007); Indy Racing League; VisionAire 500K (1997–1999); Trans-Am Series (1981, 2000, 2022); Can-Am (1978–1979)
- Website: charlottemotorspeedway.com

Quad Oval (1960–present)
- Surface: Asphalt
- Length: 1.500 mi (2.414 km)
- Turns: 4
- Banking: Turns: 24° Straights: 5°
- Race lap record: 0:24.735 ( (Sweden) Kenny Bräck, Dallara IR-7, 1998, IndyCar)

NASCAR Road Course "Roval" (2024–present)
- Surface: Asphalt
- Length: 2.320 mi (3.734 km)
- Turns: 17
- Banking: Oval turns: 24° Oval straights: 5°
- Race lap record: 1:24.163 ( (United States) Austin Dillon, Chevrolet Camaro ZL1, 2024, NASCAR Cup)

NASCAR Road Course "Roval" (2019–2023) (Note: The backstretch chicane on the Roval layout was modified in 2019, with additional changes to the chicanes announced in 2024. Despite these updates, the overall circuit length remains unchanged until 2023.)
- Surface: Asphalt
- Length: 2.280 mi (3.669 km)
- Turns: 17
- Banking: Oval turns: 24° Oval straights: 5°
- Race lap record: 1:18.188 ( (United States) Paul Menard, Chevrolet Camaro Trans-Am, 2022, TA1)

NASCAR Road Course "Roval" (2018)
- Surface: Asphalt
- Length: 2.280 mi (3.669 km)
- Turns: 17
- Banking: Oval turns: 24° Oval straights: 5°
- Race lap record: 1:18.078 ( (United States) Kyle Larson, Chevrolet Camaro ZL1, 2018, NASCAR Cup)

Roval (1971–2014)
- Surface: Asphalt
- Length: 2.250 mi (3.621 km)
- Turns: 18
- Banking: Oval turns: 24° Oval straights: 5°
- Race lap record: 1:05.524 ( (Denmark) Jan Magnussen, Panoz LMP-1 Roadster-S, 2000, LMP900)

Charlotte Motor Speedway is a 1.500 mi (2.414 km) quad-oval intermediate speedway in Concord, North Carolina, United States. It has hosted various major races since its inaugural season of racing in 1960, including NASCAR, IndyCar, and IMSA SportsCar Championship races. The facility is owned by Speedway Motorsports, LLC (SMI) and led by track general manager Jessica Fickenscher.

The speedway has a capacity of 95,000 as of 2021. The track features numerous amenities, including a Speedway Club, condos, and a seven-story tower located on the complex for office space and souvenirs. In addition, the Charlotte Motor Speedway complex features numerous adjacent tracks, including a 0.200 mi (0.322 km) clay short track, a 0.400 mi (0.644 km) dirt track, and a 0.250 mi (0.402 km) long drag strip as ZMax Dragway. The main track also features an infield road course that is used with the oval to make a "roval".

With the rise of popularity in stock car racing in the American Southeast that began in the late 1940s and stretched into the 1950s, racing promoter Bruton Smith sought to build a state-of-the-art facility. At the same time, driver and businessman Curtis Turner sought to do the same. After initially refusing, Turner eventually partnered with Smith after they agreed to sell shares needed for the track's construction. Charlotte Motor Speedway was constructed in less than 11 months. The facility immediately faced a litany of issues, particularly financial woes. Within the facility's first decade of existence, ownership changed hands numerous times, with Smith and Turner both leaving. After a period of stability under the ownership of Richard Howard from the mid-1960s to the mid-1970s, Smith and his new partner, racing promoter and eventual longtime track general manager Humpy Wheeler, completed a take over of Charlotte Motor Speedway in 1976. Since then, the Smith family and their company, SMI, have directed the facility's expansion and growth into one of the largest sports facilities in the United States.

== Description ==
=== Configurations ===
Charlotte Motor Speedway (CMS) in its current form is measured at 1.5 miles (2.4 km), with 24 degrees of banking in the turns and five degrees of banking on the track's frontstretch and backstretch. Within the main track's frontstretch, there is a 1/4 mile (0.40 km) oval that was built in 1991 and is primarily used for legends car racing.

Numerous tracks exist in the track's infield. In 1970, track officials announced plans for an infield road course that was connected to the speedway's backstretch. According to then-general manager Richard Howard, original plans for the speedway included a road course, but this was cut due to budget issues. The original road course's length has varied in reports, from as short as 1.750 mi (2.816 km) according to the Salisbury Post to as long 1.900 mi (3.058 km) long according to The Charlotte Observer. The road course held its first races on May 22, 1971, as part of the 1971 World 600 race weekend. By August 1974, the track was reconfigured to a length of 2.250 mi (3.621 km). In 2018, the road course was modified to suit NASCAR racing, adding a backstretch chicane. this was modified the following year In 2019, one of the speedway's chicanes, located on the backstretch, was modified. In 2020, developers constructed a purpose-built go-kart track in the track's infield. Further modifications to two of the road course's chicanes were announced in 2024.

=== Amenities ===
CMS is located in Concord, North Carolina, directly next to U.S. Route 29. At the time of CMS's initial construction, the complex covered 551 acres (223 ha) and had a capacity of around 30,000. Over the span of several decades, CMS and its complex have been expanded and improved numerous times. Throughout the ownership of Bruton Smith, the facility oversaw capacity growth, seeing a peak of over 170,000 by the end of the 1980s. However, since the 2000s, capacity has seen a decrease, with multiple grandstands being demolished in the 2010s; as of 2021, the track is reported to have a capacity of 95,000. The complex has also expanded to around 2,000 acres (810 ha) as of 2020.

Numerous buildings, used for a variety of purposes, are located in the complex. In 1983, to celebrate the facility's 25th anniversary, officials announced the construction of 36 condominiums that were built to overlook CMS's first turn. By the time the project was completed in mid-1984, the number of condos increased to 40, and all were sold by the end of 1983. At the end of 1984, officials announced the construction of a mall underneath the condos. Three years later, officials announced the construction of a members-only private club and restaurant named The Speedway Club, with annual membership starting at $6,500 (adjusted for inflation, $18,420).

==== Adjacent tracks ====
The Charlotte Motor Speedway complex has two adjacent tracks and a drag strip near the main speedway. By July 1993, construction started on a 0.200 mi (0.322 km) clay short track that was made to conduct dirt legends car races. On August 10, 1999, then-general manager Humpy Wheeler announced a new 0.375 mi (0.604 km) dirt track that was to be constructed across the main speedway. By January 2000, the planned track had been extended to 0.400 mi (0.644 km). The first races on this track, which featured a lighting system and a capacity of 15,000, were held on May 28, 2000.

In August 2007, owner of Speedway Motorsports, Bruton Smith, announced plans to build a dragstrip on the complex. Although the plan initially faced heavy opposition from local politicians, the dragstrip was eventually built after Smith threatened to close down the speedway, coercing the city to give him an incentive package of approximately $80 million by leveraging fears that a closure would cripple the Concord economy. The dragstrip, which cost $60 million to build, held its first races in September 2008.

== History ==
=== Planning and construction ===
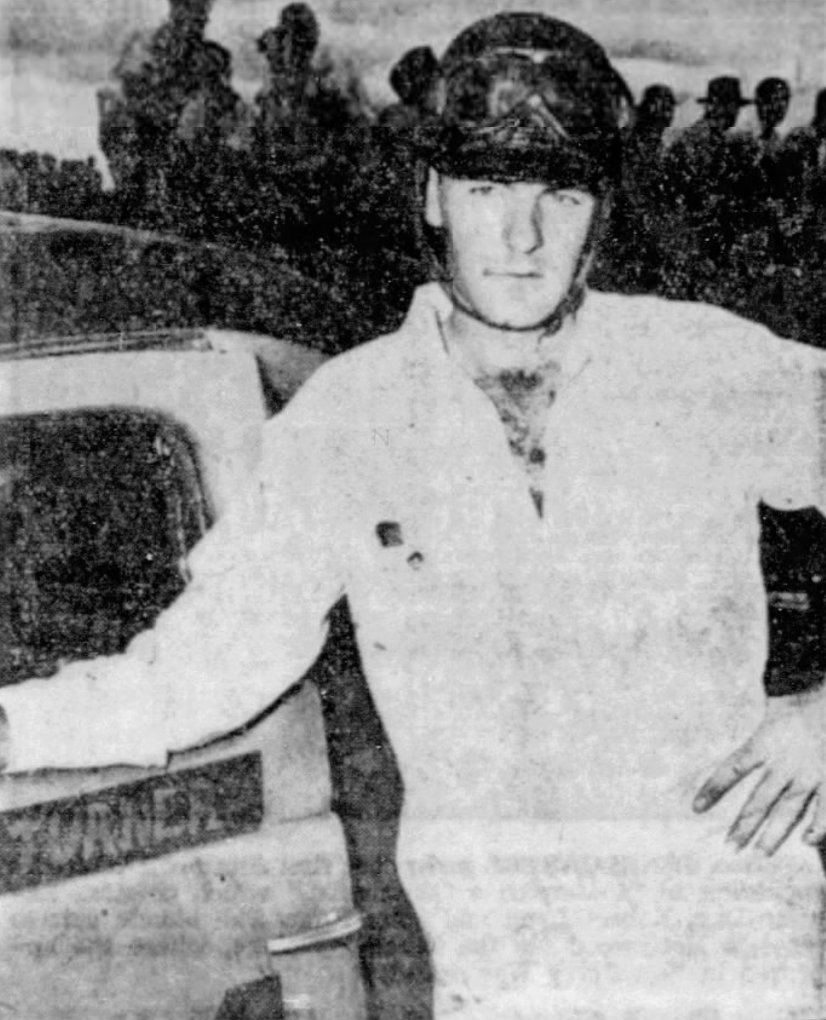
Timber businessman and driver Curtis Turner (pictured in 1949) partnered with Motorsports businessman Bruton Smith to build the Charlotte Motor Speedway.

Stock car racing, which traces its roots to moonshiners during the Prohibition era, gained significant popularity across the American Southeast during the 1940s and 1950s. This surge in interest led to the construction of modern racetracks like Darlington Raceway. In the late 1950s, promoter Bruton Smith, who had achieved success organizing races in the Carolinas, aspired to build his own racetrack. In 1956, he partnered with businessman John William Propst Jr. to pursue the project. At the same time, driver and timber businessman Curtis Turner was also working with a group of investors to build a racetrack. However, Propst suffered a heart attack in 1958 and withdrew from his partnership with Smith due to health concerns. Smith then sought a partnership with Turner. After initial discussions, Turner declined the offer during a meeting at the Barringer Hotel. Feeling betrayed and aware that Turner lacked the funds to start his track independently, Smith decided to bluff Turner's plans. On April 22, 1959, Smith announced his intention to build his own speedway—the same day Turner officially announced his track plans. Turner's track was set to be built near U.S. Route 29 in Cabarrus County, North Carolina, with a proposed capacity of 30,000 spectators. However, he struggled to sell the 300,000 shares needed to finance the project. Ultimately, Turner agreed to partner with Smith, who became the vice president of the project and successfully sold 100,000 shares. Additional stocks were made available in December 1959 and April 1960 to continue funding the speedway's construction.

Groundbreaking on the facility began on July 28, 1959, two months later than planned due to legal issues surrounding the land purchase. Construction faced immediate challenges. Crews discovered large granite veins beneath the soil shortly after breaking ground, forcing grading contractor W. Owen Flowe to use dynamite for removal, causing further delays. Aggressive hornets on-site led to multiple workers quitting, and in March 1960, three snowstorms compounded the setbacks. Despite the delays, the track's publicity director insisted construction was "still ahead of schedule." By late March, developers considered scrapping plans for grandstands to save time. The complications forced the track's first major race, the NASCAR-sanctioned 1960 World 600, to be postponed from May 29 to June 19. Longtime NASCAR mechanic Smokey Yunick criticized the location, remarking, "a giant mistake. If they'd have searched North Carolina for the worst possible place to build a racetrack, that's where they built it." Smith blamed Turner for many of the delays, claiming Turner often hired workers while intoxicated, requiring Smith to dismiss them. Despite these obstacles, the project secured additional funding, including a $300,000 (about $3,264,904 today) loan from Washington D.C. businessman James L. McIlvaine, who expressed confidence in its success, stating in The Charlotte Observer, "This is going to be one of the best investments I've ever made, and I've made some good ones."

As construction of the facility neared completion, a contract dispute arose between Flowe and his workers over unpaid fees and bounced checks. On June 9, just days before the World 600, Flowe halted construction by parking several earthmovers on the track and threatened to sue CMS officials. Accounts differ regarding what followed: Flowe claimed that multiple individuals, including Smith and Turner, threatened to shoot him and his workers if they did not resume work. Smith, however, stated that only Turner showed up with a shotgun, "[act] like he was somebody" before a guard confiscated the weapon. Construction eventually resumed and was barely completed in time for the start of activities for the 1960 World 600. Smith later called it a "miracle" that CMS was finished, admitting to losing $150,000 during its construction. According to McIlvaine, the project cost approximately two million dollars (about $21,766,029 today) with $74,000 (about $805,343 today) in debts owed to Flowe at the time of its completion.

=== Early track and financial troubles ===
CMS officially opened to cars for a practice session on June 15, 1960, but issues quickly emerged. The State reported incomplete facilities on the first day, while the track's asphalt surface developed holes due to cars reaching speeds of around 130 mph (210 km/h). The Charlotte Observer writer George Cunningham described the scene, noting "four gravel-deep fox holes grew...out of the second turn. And practically the entire surface on the third and fourth turns resembled an old lady's wrinkled face." Despite this, some, including driver Glenn "Fireball" Roberts, hoped the surface would improve at higher speeds. Track officials ordered a hasty repaving, which mostly held up by the following day. However, financial troubles followed on June 18, when officials were sued for $10,000 (about $108,830 today) by Roy E. Thomas, who claimed breach of contract after being fired from his role selling advertising space for souvenir programs. On race day, promoter Bruton Smith prayed the race would surpass halfway, fearing he'd have to issue refunds otherwise. During the race, surface problems returned. Drivers such as Tom Pistone, Doug Yates, and Ned Jarrett reported mechanical failures, including blown tires, broken axles, and suspensions due to the track's rough conditions. Emanuel Zervakis exclaimed in a Charlotte Observer interview, "It's rough as hell! All the cars will have to be rebuilt... there's no doubt about it." Asphalt broke apart in multiple areas, forcing drivers to dodge flying debris. In a post-race analysis, Max Muhlehurn of The Charlotte News heavily criticized the track's surface, stating, "The 600 will go down in history as the only race ever run in which drivers were forced to dodge track blemishes more often than other cars".

On July 17, McIlvaine spread rumors that the facility's board of directors intended to appoint new management, possibly under NASCAR president Bill France Sr. or Darlington Raceway president Bob Colvin. Both Smith and Turner quickly denied the rumors, with Turner threatening legal action. Over the next few months, multiple claims surfaced alleging that Smith and Turner owed significant sums to various organizations and companies, including $90,000 (about $979,471 today) to the Connecticut General Life Insurance Co., $40,200 (about $437,497 today) to the Internal Revenue Service, $65,000 (about $707,396 today) to Propst and his construction company, and $204,000 (about $2,220,135 today) to McDevitt Street and Co. The facility had also defaulted on its initial mortgage. By early August, only Propst had been paid, though additional track repaving was scheduled to address ongoing surface issues. By November 22, reports indicated that CMS had accumulated approximately $1 million (about $10,883,015 today) in debt. In January 1961, two more lawsuits were filed by excavating companies.

On March 1, 1961, Flowe filed a civil lawsuit against the track, alleging breach of contract and seeking $138,155.28 (about $1,488,477 today) in reparations for construction costs. Three months later, following McIlvaine's threat of foreclosure and the auction of CMS, Turner and Smith resigned from the board of directors, though Smith remained as the promotional director. Duke Ellington, a board member, replaced Turner as the track's general manager. Turner later accused Smith and Ellington of conspiring to oust him and inflating the track's profits. In July, Turner and his investor group announced plans to regain control of CMS by either purchasing the track in a public sale or acquiring a controlling amount of stock. By August, despite an "unusually successful" 1961 World 600, the track warned stockholders that CMS was in "serious trouble" and could only achieve financial stability through immediate long-term financing. By early October, the facility still faced $500,000 in debt. As a result, foreclosure proceedings began, with plans to auction the track on October 30. In a last-ditch effort to stop the foreclosure, several solutions were proposed, including securing a "miracle" loan and a plan for Smith to partner with investors to raise $600,000 to save the facility. After the auction was delayed, U.S. District Judge James Braxton Craven Jr. ruled on November 3 that the court would take over management of CMS. The track entered Chapter 10 bankruptcy, with all officers and directors removed from their positions. The facility was placed under court protection, shielding it from creditors and effectively becoming a ward of the court.

==== Federal court control ====
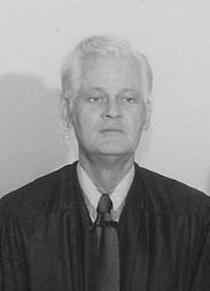
For over a year, district judge James Braxton Craven Jr. oversaw CMS' financial restructuring.

After Craven's ruling, he appointed Robert Nelson Robinson, a local Charlotte lawyer, to manage the track. Several loan offers were made to help resolve the facility's financial troubles, including separate proposals from businessmen Roger D. Edwards and Dwight Cross. On December 9, Craven ruled that the track's management could seek loans without immediate pressure from creditors, and he ordered Robinson to develop a plan to ensure a $900,000 (about $9,696,548 today) payment to various creditors. By early January 1962, no progress had been made, prompting Craven to threaten liquidation of the track by March if a viable plan was not presented. By the end of January, a shareholder committee led by A. C. Goines proposed a solution: asking the track's nearly 2,300 shareholders to purchase trustee certificates valued between $100 and $1,000, with the goal of raising $300,000—half of the $600,000 needed for reorganization. Following a successful stockholder meeting on February 18, a final effort to raise an additional $50,000 took place six days later. The committee succeeded in meeting the $300,000 goal, but a loan offer from Cross to cover the remaining debts was rejected. By May, Craven ordered an investigation into Charlotte Motor Speedway. By July, while Craven remained optimistic about saving the facility, preliminary findings of mismanagement and potential fraud led to the involvement of the Federal Bureau of Investigation (FBI). Eventually, a reorganization plan hearing was scheduled for November 5.

In October, a new $345,000 loan from McIlvaine was guaranteed, despite track officials already owing him over $300,000, alleviating some financial pressure. The following month, Craven approved Robinson's proposal to allow stockholders and creditors to vote on a reorganization plan, scheduled to run through January 3, 1963. While the plan initially lacked sufficient creditor support, it was eventually approved, and Craven granted final approval for a stock sale in February. By April, the plan had achieved significant success, with the owners repaying over $740,000 in debt. In mid-April, Craven approved the establishment of private ownership under an 11-person board of directors led by A.C. Goines, with the arrangement set to last for at least one year, effectively completing the reorganization process. That same year, Bruton Smith left his position after being found guilty of failing to file tax returns for 1955 and 1956.

=== Richard Howard era, stabilization ===
In December 1963, Goines announced a 10% stock dividend, stating, "We've taken some bitter medicine, but the patient has been saved." By February 1964, CMS reported its first profit. Goines stepped down after the mandatory one-year period, and Richard Howard, a leading stockholder and furniture store owner, took over. The track faced several deaths in the mid-1960s. Veteran driver Fireball Roberts died on July 2, 1964, from complications following a fiery crash at the 1964 World 600. Another fatality occurred on October 17, 1965, when Harold Kite, a World War II veteran, was killed in a crash during the first lap of the 1965 National 400.

Under Howard's leadership, CMS paid off its mortgage three years ahead of schedule, finally resolving the track's financial challenges. Known as a "good ol' country boy," Howard was conservative with spending but invested strategically in renovations and capacity expansions. In 1965, track officials diversified their holdings by acquiring the Rightway Investment Corporation, an insurance finance company. In 1970, management announced plans to construct a new road course and additional grandstands, as indicated by tax records. By 1972, CMS was achieving consistent year-over-year profit growth.

=== Bruton Smith and Humpy Wheeler's takeover ===
In the mid-1970s, Smith saw the potential profitability of reacquiring CMS, particularly with the R. J. Reynolds Tobacco Company and its subsidiary, Winston, sponsoring the NASCAR Cup Series starting in 1970. By 1973, Smith had purchased nearly 500,000 shares, a significant increase from his initial 40,000 shares. In early 1974, despite efforts to block board elections, Smith was elected chairman of the track's board of directors, effectively returning him to a leadership role. Howard was appointed as the facility's president, and later that year, he announced a $2.5 million renovation project to enhance the track's appearance and expand seating capacity.

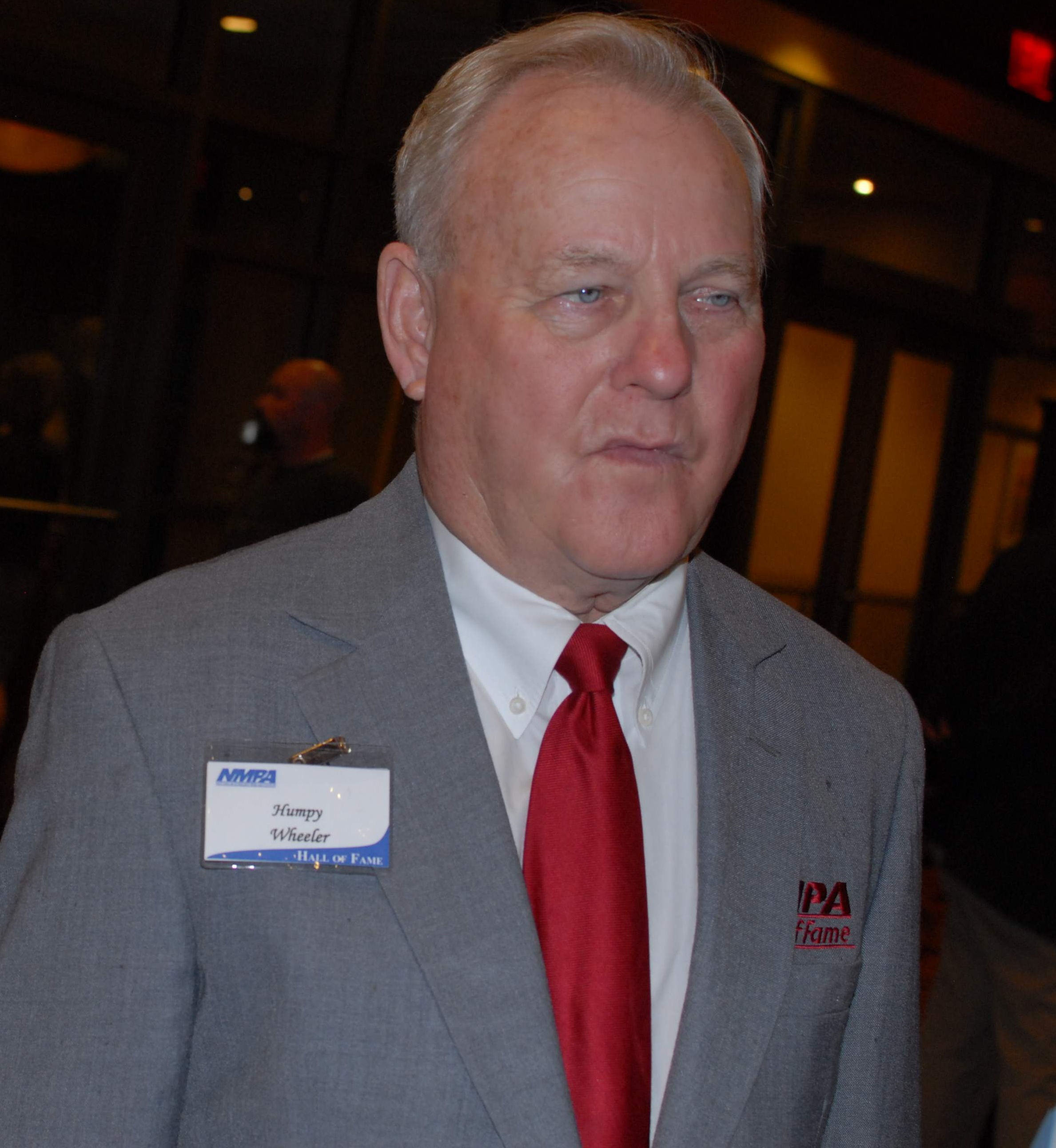
Humpy Wheeler (pictured in 2010) partnered with Bruton Smith to takeover control of Charlotte Motor Speedway from Richard Howard.

Throughout 1975, Howard and Smith engaged in a heated battle for control of the organization, exchanging sharp criticisms in the media. In January, Howard regained control of the board of directors despite initially threatening to resign. By February, Howard criticized Smith for managing the track from Illinois, prompting Smith to accuse him of consolidating power and financial misconduct. A major turning point came in July when Smith purchased approximately 80,000 shares from Howard's relatives. On August 29, Smith hired H. A. "Humpy" Wheeler, a former public relations executive, as the track's development director. Local media speculated that Wheeler's hiring signaled Smith's impending takeover. On October 5, The Atlanta Journal-Constitution reported that the upcoming National 500 would likely be Howard's last race associated with the facility, with a final decision expected at the annual stockholders' meeting on January 30, 1976. Although Howard initially denied these claims and expressed interest in working as a consultant for Smith, he later admitted on October 23 that he was "99% certain" of leaving. At the stockholders' meeting, Howard officially announced his resignation, giving Smith full control of the facility. Wheeler subsequently assumed the role of president.

==== Humpy Wheeler era, promotions, failed NFL proposal ====
Under the leadership of Wheeler and Smith, CMS underwent significant promotion, expansion, and modernization. In Wheeler's first year as president, he announced a $3–5 million renovation project slated for completion in 1981. Wheeler became known for his creative and elaborate promotional efforts. In 1976, he attracted female spectators by convincing Janet Guthrie to enter the World 600. The following year, he fueled the rivalry between veteran driver Cale Yarborough and newcomer Darrell Waltrip by creating a spectacle involving Waltrip's nickname, "Jaws," and Yarborough's sponsor, Holly Farms Poultry. Wheeler placed a dead chicken inside the mouth of a dead shark, mounted it on a pickup truck's sling, and paraded it before the first qualifying round of the 1977 NAPA National 500. By 1980, officials announced additional renovations worth $16 million, aiming to increase the speedway's capacity to 150,000. In 1983, Bruton and Wheeler unveiled plans for the construction of 36 condominiums, later expanded to 40. Despite initial skepticism, all units sold out by their completion in 1984.

In 1985, the city of Charlotte made efforts to attract a professional football team. In March, Bruton Smith announced plans to construct a 76,000-seat stadium on the frontstretch of CMS. The proposed stadium would feature temporary endzone grandstands and retractable seating behind the track's pit road. While the original track plans had included a football stadium, those plans were abandoned due to construction challenges. During the official announcement on March 13, Smith declared he would move forward with the stadium project if the local government or private investors contributed $10 million. Meanwhile, George Shinn, another Charlotte businessman, also pursued a professional football team, expressing interest in acquiring either a National Football League (NFL) franchise or a United States Football League (USFL) team. Smith, however, was focused solely on securing an NFL team. The city ultimately declined to provide financial support for the stadium, and the plans were abandoned by the end of the year. Despite this, Smith expressed renewed interest in hosting an NFL team at the track two years later.

==== Mass expansion and improvement, injury-riddled period ====
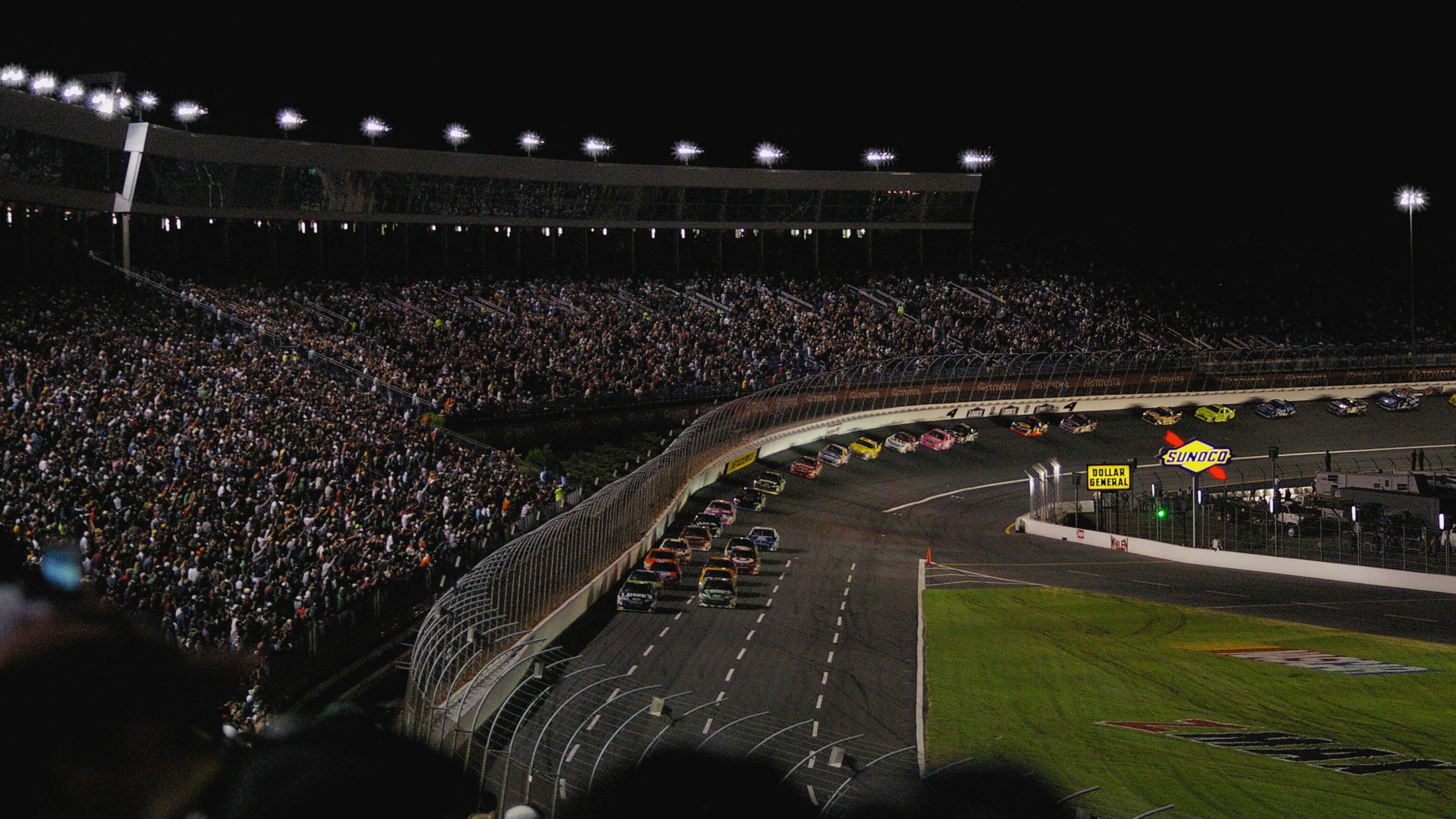
Night racing at the 2008 Bank of America 500; in 1992, the track installed lights to accommodate night racing, the first track of its size to do so.

In 1987, construction began on The Speedway Club, an exclusive members-only restaurant and club. By the end of the decade, the track had a capacity of 170,922. In 1991, Smith oversaw the installation of lights—an unprecedented move for an oval track of its size—with help from Iowa-based Musco Lighting. The project was completed in April 1992. In 1994, the garage area was renovated for $1 million, earning praise from driver Dale Jarrett. In 1999, the track made history by selling naming rights to Lowe's, the first such deal for a speedway.

Throughout the 1990s and early 2000s, the track saw numerous serious incidents involving both drivers and spectators. In 1989, track president Wheeler created the NASCAR Sportsman Division to give short-track drivers experience on larger circuits. The series quickly developed a reputation for danger, with three fatal crashes in six years: David Gaines in 1990, Gary Batson in 1992, and Russell Phillips in 1995. The third of these was decapitated after his head hit a caution light on the track's catchfence. Wheeler handed the series over to NASCAR in late 1995, who quickly shut down it in 1996. In 1999, during the VisionAire 500K — an Indy Racing League race — a crash involving Stan Wattles and John Paul Jr. on the track's frontstretch sent heavy debris into the grandstands, killing three spectators and injuring eight others, resulting in the cancellation of the race. A year later, after the 2000 Winston, a pedestrian bridge collapsed, injuring 107 people, which was later blamed on an improper additive used in construction. In 2001 and 2002, two ARCA drivers, Blaise Alexander and Eric Martin respectively, were killed in separate accidents.

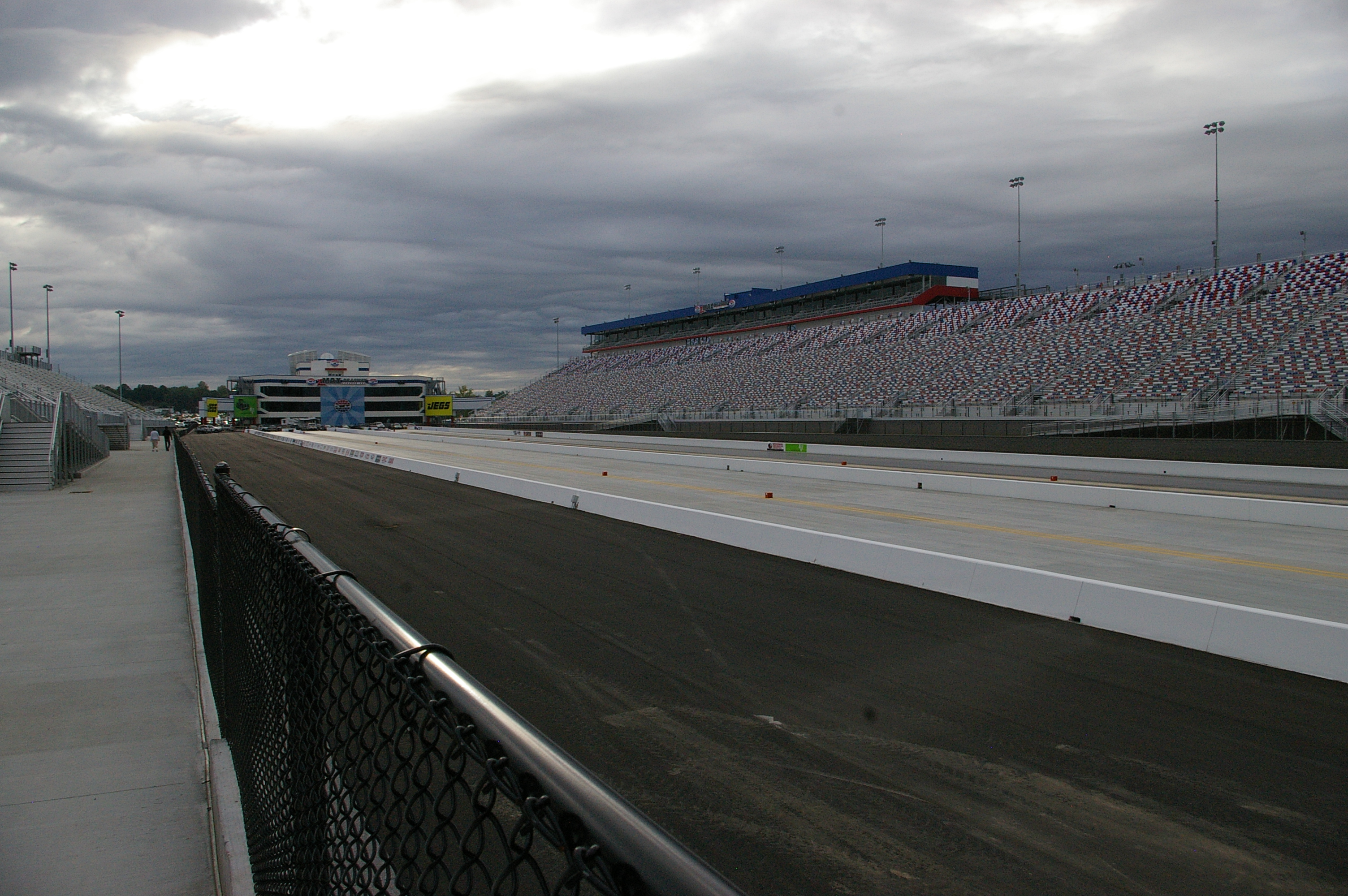
The Charlotte Motor Speedway drag strip pictured in 2008. The drag strip was built after a tumultuous and controversial approval process.

In 2005, officials repaved the track using a process called levigation to smooth out bumps, but it caused problems during both of that year's NASCAR weekends. This led to another repave in 2006. In 2007, Smith announced plans to build a drag strip, which faced strong opposition from the Concord City Council. Despite the pushback, Smith began grading the site. On October 2, the council unanimously voted to block the project. In response, Smith threatened to shut down the track or turn it into a testing facility, which would have hurt the local economy. The council quickly reversed course, offering an $80 million incentive package (about $124,217,622 today), a street named after Smith, a tax break, and approval to build the drag strip. On November 26, Smith confirmed the track would continue operating, saying, "We're here forever."

=== Post-Wheeler era ===
Tensions between Smith and Wheeler had been documented since 1991, with the two being in "constant disagreement" over topics. By 2008, Wheeler grew frustrated with several of Smith's decisions, including the controversial drag strip. On May 21, 2008, Wheeler announced his retirement following the Coca-Cola 600, ending a tenure that began in 1975. Though Smith claimed to offer Wheeler a consulting role and said Wheeler wanted a part-time position, Wheeler ultimately stepped away from all duties at CMS. He was succeeded by Smith's son, Marcus. In 2009, Lowe's ended its eleven-year sponsorship, and the track returned to its original "Charlotte Motor Speedway" name.

==== Steady attendance declines, renovations ====
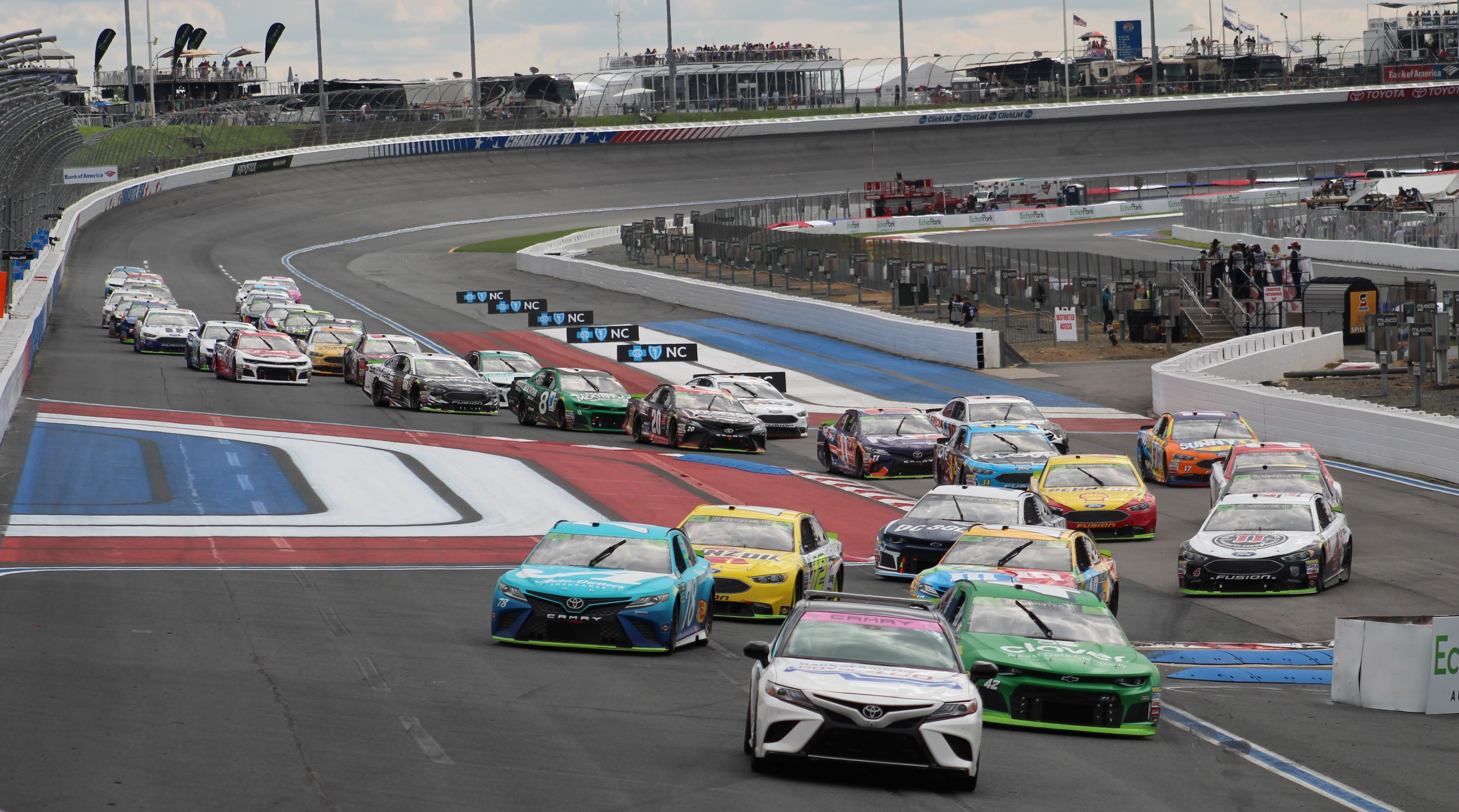
NASCAR racing at the track's roval course; in 2018, NASCAR changed their fall race weekend to race on the track's roval.

During the 2010s, CMS experienced steady attendance declines, mirroring broader trends in NASCAR. In response, officials removed 41,000 seats in 2014 and more in 2017. That same year, the track served as a filming location for Logan Lucky, a heist film set at the facility. In 2018, Marcus stepped down as general manager to focus on his role as SMI CEO, with executive vice president Greg Walter taking over. Walter expressed interest in expanding CMS's non-racing uses and pursuing further renovations. In 2021, the NASCAR All-Star Race—long held at CMS except in 1986 and 2020—was moved to Texas Motor Speedway in hopes of boosting Texas Motor Speedway's attendance. In July 2026, Walter transitioned to becoming the president of CMS, with CMS executive Jessica Fickenscher taking over general manager duties. Fickenscher had been acting general manager since April 2025 after Walter underwent and recovered from a heart transplant.

Since the 2010s, CMS has undergone several renovations. In 2011, Marcus oversaw the installation of a 200-by-800-foot video screen on the backstretch, replacing old seating. In 2015, the track's SAFER barrier were upgraded following Kyle Busch's injury at Daytona. In 2023, plans were announced for a dedicated road course. The road course, named the Ten Tenths Motor Club, was opened in October 2024.

== Events ==
=== Racing events ===
==== NASCAR ====
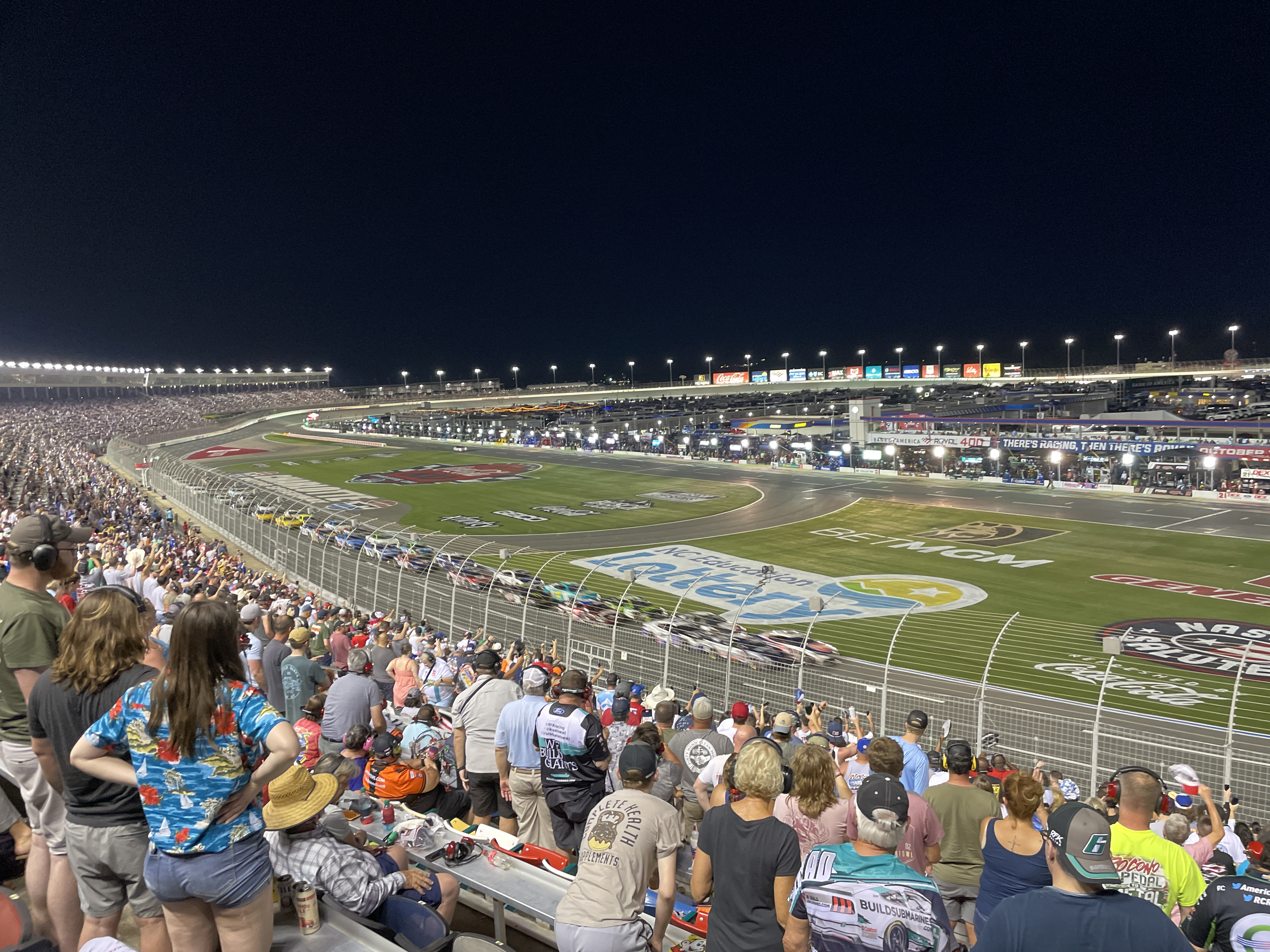
The 2024 Coca-Cola 600. The Coca-Cola 600 has been held annually at the facility since 1960.

Charlotte Motor Speedway hosts two annual NASCAR weekends: the Coca-Cola 600 (originally known as the World 600) and the Bank of America 400. The Coca-Cola 600, introduced in 1960, quickly became one of the longest, most prestigious, and highest-paying motor races in the world. It is now considered a "Crown Jewel" event on the NASCAR schedule.

The Bank of America 400 (originally known as the National 500) was first run in 1960. In 2018, the race was shifted to a specialized "Roval" course. In 2026, the race was shifted back to the traditional oval track. In addition to its NASCAR Cup Series races, CMS also hosts the NASCAR O'Reilly Auto Parts Series (BetMGM 300, Blue Cross NC 250) and NASCAR Truck Series (North Carolina Education Lottery 200, EcoSave 250) events on the oval layout as support races for the Cup Series.

In 1985, Wheeler and the R. J. Reynolds Tobacco Company introduced The Winston (now known as the NASCAR All-Star Race), a showcase event featuring race winners from the previous season. From 1987 to 2020, Charlotte Motor Speedway hosted the event annually, with periodic changes to its format and eligibility rules. In 2020, the race was relocated to Bristol Motor Speedway.

==== Other racing events ====
In late 1979, the United States Auto Club (USAC) announced plans to run a 500 kilometres (310 mi) race in October 1980. However, the race was canceled in April due to an agreement with USAC and Championship Auto Racing Teams (CART). In December 1996, IndyCar announced plans for a race to be held in July 1997. The race ran for three years; the last race was canceled after an accident caused flying debris that killed three spectators.

Numerous runnings of the Grand Prix of Charlotte, a sports car event, have been run by various organizations. In 2000, the facility held a one-off Grand Prix of Charlotte that was sanctioned by the American Le Mans Series. The race was last run in 2020 by the IMSA SportsCar Championship.

=== Non-racing events ===
==== Festivals and shows ====
On August 10, 1974, CMS hosted the August Jam. Regarded as "Carolina's Woodstock", the festival drew over 200,000 people, more than double than what was expected due to a security breach. The festival unintentionally became the largest music festival in North Carolina history. It soon gained a reputation for violence; Richard Howard, president of CMS, compared the actions of spectators to Japanese Army suicide attacks at the Battle of Okinawa, with damages totaling $50,000.

From 2013 to 2018, the facility held the Carolina Rebellion festival. Since 2021, CMS has hosted a branch of the touring Breakaway Festival. In 2024, the organizers of the Breakaway Festival also planned a second show at the facility, tailored for EDM.

CMS hosts an annual Christmas-themed drive-thru lights show, a tradition that started in 2010. In the wake of the COVID-19 pandemic, the track hosted high school graduations for 10 high schools within the Cabarrus County area.

==== Unrealized events ====
In February 1961, track officials wished to host a National Football League (NFL) exhibition game between the Washington Redskins and the Philadelphia Eagles; however, the deal fell through when Smith found terms from Redskins owner George Preston Marshall to be unreasonable.

== Lap records ==
As of October 2025, the fastest official race lap records at the Charlotte Motor Speedway are listed as:

Category	Time	Driver	Vehicle	Event
Oval (1960–present): 1.500 mi (2.414 km)
IndyCar	0:24.735	Kenny Bräck	Dallara IR-7	1998 VisionAire 500K
NASCAR Cup	0:28.598	Jimmie Johnson	Chevrolet SS	2017 Coca-Cola 600
NASCAR Xfinity	0:29.962	Kyle Busch	Toyota GR Supra NASCAR	2020 Alsco 300
NASCAR Truck	0:30.017	Carson Hocevar	Chevrolet Silverado	2023 North Carolina Education Lottery 200
ARCA Menards Series	0:30.393	Dean Thompson	Toyota Camry	2023 General Tire 150
NASCAR "Roval" (Road Course-Oval with chicanes) (2024–present): 2.320 mi (3.734 km)
NASCAR Cup	1:24.163	Austin Dillon	Chevrolet Camaro ZL1	2024 Bank of America Roval 400
NASCAR Xfinity	1:26.134	Sam Mayer	Chevrolet Camaro SS	2024 Drive for the Cure 250
NASCAR Truck	1:26.666	Brent Crews	Toyota Tundra TRD	2025 Ecosave 250
Mustang Challenge	1:28.624	Robert Noaker	Ford Mustang Dark Horse R	2025 Charlotte Mustang Challenge round
NASCAR "Roval" (Road Course-Oval with chicanes) (2019–2023): 2.280 mi (3.669 km)
TA1	1:18.188	Paul Menard	Chevrolet Camaro Trans-Am	2022 Charlotte Trans-Am round
NASCAR Cup	1:21.795	A. J. Allmendinger	Chevrolet Camaro ZL1	2022 Bank of America Roval 400
TA2	1:21.967	Connor Zilisch	Chevrolet Camaro Trans-Am	2022 Charlotte Trans-Am round
NASCAR Xfinity	1:23.330	Ty Gibbs	Toyota GR Supra NASCAR	2022 Drive for the Cure 250
LM GTE	1:26.655	Connor De Phillippi	BMW M8 GTE	2020 MOTUL 100% Synthetic Grand Prix
GT3	1:27.546	Bill Auberlen	BMW M6 GT3	2020 MOTUL 100% Synthetic Grand Prix
NASCAR "Roval" (Road Course-Oval with chicanes) (2018): 2.280 mi (3.669 km)
NASCAR Cup	1:18.078	Kyle Larson	Chevrolet Camaro ZL1	2018 Bank of America Roval 400
NASCAR Xfinity	1:18.869	Chase Briscoe	Ford Mustang GT	2018 Drive for the Cure 200
Road Course (1971–2014): 2.250 mi (3.621 km)
LMP900	1:05.524	Jan Magnussen	Panoz LMP-1 Roadster-S	2000 Grand Prix of Charlotte
IMSA GTP	1:08.170	Bob Wollek	Ford Mustang GTP	1984 Charlotte GT 500
Can-Am	1:09.443	Alan Jones	Lola T333CS	1978 Charlotte Trans-Am round
GT1 (GTS)	1:10.817	Karl Wendlinger	Dodge Viper GTS-R	2000 Grand Prix of Charlotte
IMSA GTO	1:12.756	Dennis Aase	Toyota Celica	1985 Grand Prix of Charlotte
IMSA GTP Lights	1:12.853	John Maffucci	Argo JM16B	1985 Grand Prix of Charlotte
Group 4	1:14.406	Peter Gregg	Porsche 911 Carrera RSR	1974 Charlotte 300
Trans-Am	1:15.046	George Follmer	Chevrolet Camaro	1981 Charlotte Trans-Am round
GT	1:15.277	Dirk Müller	Porsche 911 GT3-R (996)	2000 Grand Prix of Charlotte
IMSA GTU	1:16.127	Chris Cord	Toyota Celica	1985 Grand Prix of Charlotte
