= David Gaines (racing driver) =

American racing driver

David Arthur Gaines (January 20, 1963 - May 16, 1990) was a NASCAR Limited Sportsman Division race car driver from Goldston, North Carolina.

Gaines was killed in a practice session at Lowes Motor Speedway. In a five-car wreck involving Ted Comstock and Terri Sawyer, Gaines' car had slowed for the wreck of two cars in front of him, but was hit from the rear by Peter Gibbons. Gaines' car stopped in the middle of the track and was hit broadside by Steve McEachern.
