= The Charlotte News =

- Type: Daily newspaper
- Founded: December 8, 1888; 137 years ago
- Ceased publication: 1985
- Language: English
- City: Charlotte, North Carolina
- Country: United States

The Charlotte News was the afternoon newspaper in Charlotte, North Carolina. It was first published on December 8, 1888. The newspaper was eventually purchased on April 5, 1959 by Knight Newspapers, owner of its larger rival The Charlotte Observer. All operations of the News and the Observer were merged except news and editorial content, which was merged in 1983. The News ceased publication on November 1, 1985.

== See also ==
- The Charlotte Observer
