= Speedway Children's Charities =

Nonprofit organization in the U.S.

- Founded: 1982; 44 years ago
- Founder: Bruton Smith
- Type: Non-governmental organization, Non-profit organization
- Legal status: 501(c)(3)
- Purpose: To raise and provide funds to nonprofit organizations that meet the direct needs of children with medical, educational, or social challenges.
- Headquarters: Charlotte Motor Speedway, Concord, North Carolina, U.S.
- Region served: United States
- President: Marcus G. Smith
- Revenue: $3,850,146 (2017)
- Expenses: $3,925,136 (2017)
- Employees: 0 (2016)
- Volunteers: 2,500 (2016)
- Website: www.speedwaycharities.org

Speedway Children's Charities (SCC) is a US 501(c)(3) nonprofit organization that provides funding for organizations that meet the direct needs of children. Nationwide, Speedway Children's Charities distributed over $2.9 million across its eight chapters in 2019.

== History ==
Speedway Children's Charities was founded by Bruton Smith, Chairman of Speedway Motorsports (SMI) and Sonic Automotive, after his son, Bruton Cameron Smith, died at a very young age.

SCC became a national organization in 1982, and now includes a network of eight chapters based at each of the eight SMI facilities across the United States.

Major General Thomas M. Sadler served as the executive director of Speedway Children’s Charities from 1990 until 2014. Major General Chuck Swannack served as the executive director of Speedway Children's Charities from 2014 until 2018.

== Chapter locations ==
- Atlanta Motor Speedway – Hampton, GA
- Bristol Motor Speedway – Bristol, TN
- Charlotte Motor Speedway – Concord, NC
- Kentucky Speedway – Sparta, KY
- Las Vegas Motor Speedway – Las Vegas, NV
- New Hampshire Motor Speedway – Loudon, NH
- Sonoma Raceway – Sonoma, CA
- Texas Motor Speedway – Fort Worth, TX

== Fundraising and grants ==
SCC chapters hold events that raise funds to help address the medical, educational, and social needs of children. These events include on-track activities, live auctions, clay shoots, galas, 5K runs, golf tournaments, and other fundraising opportunities. Monies raised are distributed to local non-profit organizations through grants at the end of the calendar year. Each chapter holds a distribution ceremony to recognize the organizations receiving the grants.

== Impact ==
Since the organization was founded in 1982, Speedway Children’s Charities has awarded in excess of $58.3 million to nonprofit organizations throughout the nation.
