= Bob Latford =

NASCAR administrator

Robert Graham 'Bob' Latford (July 29, 1935 – July 23, 2003) was a NASCAR historian best known for developing the point system used in the NASCAR Cup Series from 1975 to 2010 (slightly modified in later years), NASCAR O'Reilly Auto Parts Series and NASCAR Craftsman Truck Series.

== Career ==
Latford began his 55-year career in motorsports media and public relations by selling programs for the Daytona Beach races in 1946 for NASCAR founder Bill France Sr., the father of Bill France Jr. who was one of Latford's classmates at Seabreeze High School. Following a stint in the United States Armed Forces, Latford was attending the University of Florida when he was offered a public relations job at the new Daytona International Speedway by France, Sr. and Houston Lawing. The first Daytona 500 took place in 1959.

Later on, Latford served as a public relations official and press box director at several tracks, including Charlotte Motor Speedway. He devised a point system, which was adopted in 1975, and used by NASCAR from 1975 until 2010. In the system, the winner received 175 points, second 170 points, and other positions exactly the same as the current points system.

From 1979–2000, Latford was the statistician for all NASCAR broadcasts on CBS.

Latford was also a color commentator for two NASCAR races on FNN and Score in 1988.

Latford also published a weekly newsletter for motorsports journalists, The Inside Line, along with four books (see below).

Latford worked his final race in the press box at Rockingham Speedway, the Pop Secret 400 on October 22, 2000.

On July 23, 2003 Latford died at the age of 67.

== Legacy ==
At the annual North Carolina Auto Racing Hall Of Fame ceremony in October 2003, NASCAR Scene editor and hall of fame board member Deb Williams paid tribute to Latford.

In 2004, Latford was posthumously awarded the National Motorsports Press Association/Pocono Spirit Award which "recognizes character and achievement in the face of adversity as well as sportsmanship and contributions to motorsports."

== Books ==
- Built For Speed (1999 HC, 2002 PB) Courage Books. PB ISBN 978-0-7624-1205-1
- 50 Years Of NASCAR (2002) Carlton Books.
- NASCAR: A Celebration (2002) Carlton Books. ISBN 978-1-85868-796-4
- ARCA 50th Anniversary Book (2002) Written for ARCA
