= NASCAR Illustrated =

Magazine

- Categories: Sports
- Frequency: Monthly
- Circulation: 85,000
- Final issue: July 1, 2016
- Company: American City Business Journals
- Country: United States
- Based in: Charlotte, North Carolina
- Language: English

NASCAR Illustrated (formerly Winston Cup Illustrated) was a monthly magazine about NASCAR stock car racing. Established in 1982, it was closed by publisher American City Business Journals in mid-2016.

== History ==
NASCAR Illustrated began publication in 1982. It was described as a "niche magazine".

In 2010, NASCAR Scene was shuttered and merged into Illustrated.

ACBJ notified employees of the magazine's stoppage of circulation via email in June 2016.

== Staff ==
- Liz Allison
- Kelly Crandall
- Cindy Elliott
- Jim Fluharty
- Claire B. Lang
- Steve Waid
- Ben White
