= Jeff Gluck =

American motorsports journalist

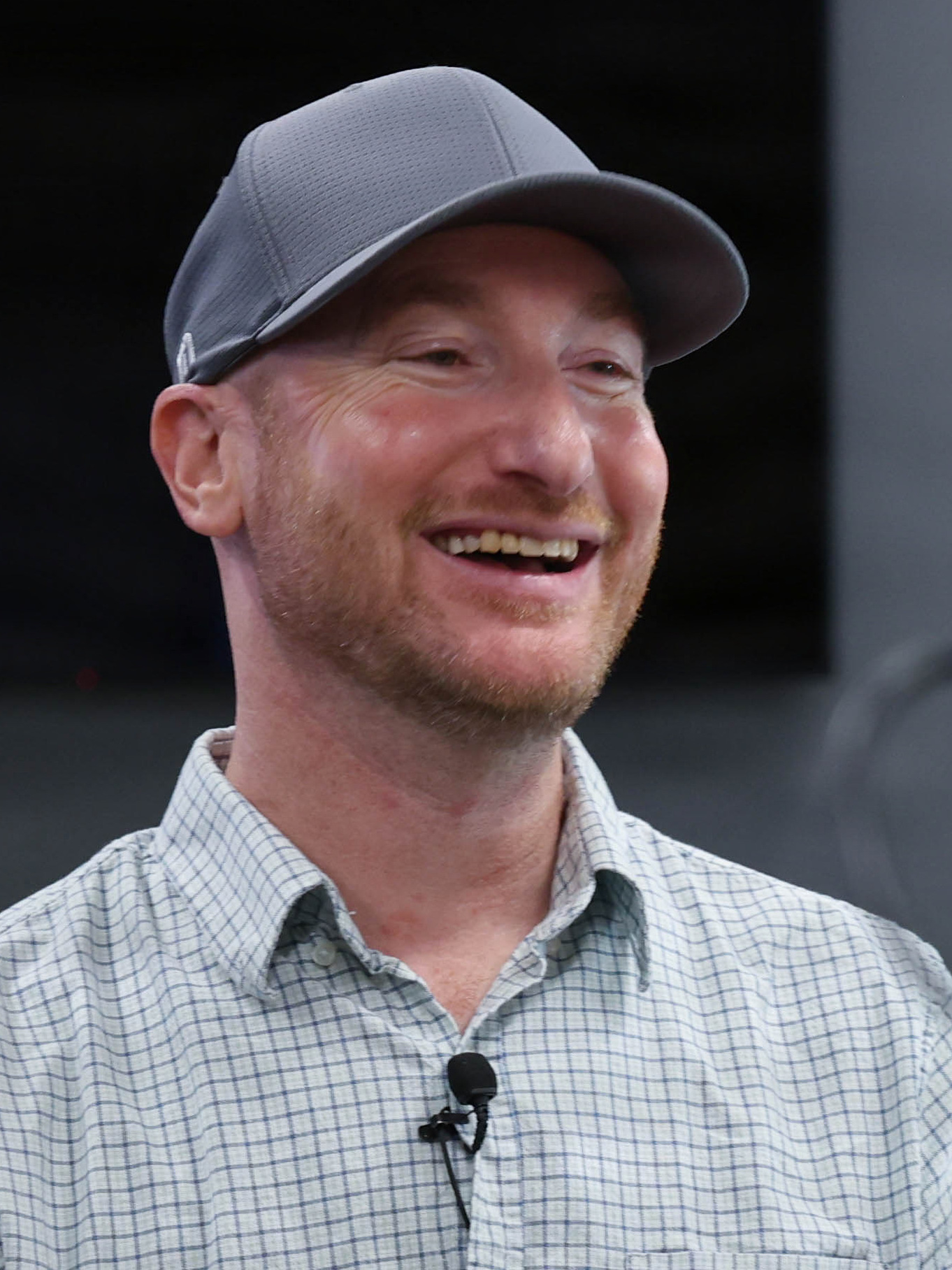
- Gluck in 2026
- Born: Jeffrey Gluck; September 19, 1980 (age 45)
- Education: University of Delaware
- Occupation: Journalist
- Years active: 2004–present
- Employer(s): The Athletic; JeffGluck.com (former); USA Today (former); NASCAR Scene (former)

Jeffrey Gluck is an American motorsports journalist for The Athletic. Gluck is best known for his coverage of NASCAR races. He has a "12 Questions" interview column where he asks NASCAR and other motorsports drivers 12 different questions each season. He is also known for posting "Quiet Track" photos of empty racetracks and "Was it a good race?" polls on Twitter after races are done. He has previously written for NASCAR Scene, USA Today, and his own reader-funded website.

== Early life ==
While in college at the University of Delaware, Gluck took a sports writing class offered and began writing for the school's newspaper.

In his first newspaper job in Rocky Mount, North Carolina, he was asked to cover a race at the local Rockingham Speedway. This would spark Gluck's interest in NASCAR.

== Career ==
In 2007, Gluck was hired by the NASCAR Scene as an associate editor.

In 2009, he was laid off from NASCAR Scene due to economic issues caused by the Great Recession. At the same time, then-startup sports news blog SB Nation was looking for a NASCAR reporter to write for their website. CEO Jim Bankoff would proceed to hire Gluck, before leaving at the end of 2012 for USA Today.

In 2016, Gluck would come under fire from NASCAR after he wrote an article with the headline "NASCAR looks beyond declining attendance, TV ratings". NASCAR, which had been experiencing declining rating and attendance, was worried about their public appearance in the media, and during a midseason update meeting, a high-ranking official told Gluck and drivers that Gluck's coverage was "killing the sport." In a meeting without Gluck, someone held a copy of the article as an example of unneeded and unaffordable negative coverage at the time. Some drivers, including Carl Edwards, were also angry at Gluck, and one driver, who had not read the article, confronted Gluck at the racetrack.

In 2017, Gluck would leave USA Today due to "family-related reasons" and would instead start up his own site that was funded by his own readers. According to Gluck, his wife, Sarah, was trying to become a Child Life Specialist, which would need the Gluck family to have flexibility on moving around the country.

In 2019, Gluck joined The Athletic when the sports website expanded to cover motorsports.

In April 2024, NASCAR website The Daily Downforce named Gluck one of the best NASCAR personalities to follow on social media.

== Personal life ==
Gluck is currently married to Sarah Gluck. The two welcomed their second daughter in March 2021.
