= Marcus Smith (businessman) =

American businessman (born 1973)

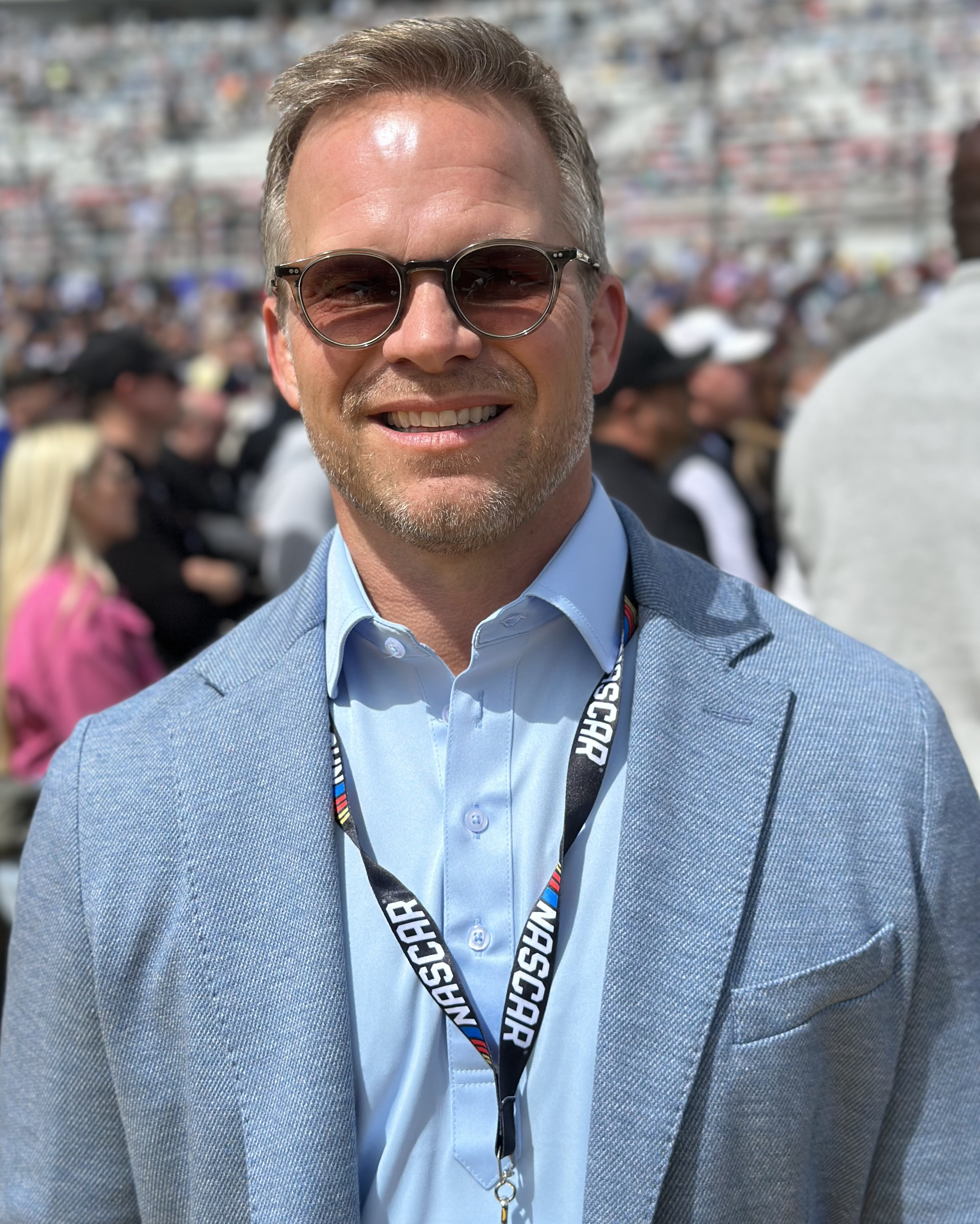
- Smith at the Las Vegas Motor Speedway in 2025
- Born: Marcus Graham Smith; April 11, 1973 (age 53); Charlotte, North Carolina, U.S.
- Education: University of North Carolina at Chapel Hill (dropped out)
- Occupation: Businessman
- Years active: 1996–present
- Organization: Speedway Motorsports
- Spouse: Cassandra Anne Mitchell (m. 1996)
- Children: 2

Marcus Graham Smith (born April 11, 1973) is an American businessman. He is best known as the chief executive officer (CEO) of Speedway Motorsports, LLC (SMI), an organization that owns or operates 11 racetracks across the United States. Smith, being the heir of his father, Bruton Smith, had previously worked for SMI at various positions within the organization before being officially promoted to becoming CEO in 2015.

Smith was born and raised in Charlotte, North Carolina. Initially wanting to train to become a doctor at the University of North Carolina at Chapel Hill, he later dropped out and joined his father's company, working at the Charlotte Motor Speedway's marketing team as a sales associate. He later was promoted to the manager of new business development of the speedway in 1999. In 2004, he was reassigned to the track's parent company, SMI, to become their head of sales and marketing. Four years later, Smith was promoted to become the president of SMI and was also put in charge to run the Charlotte Motor Speedway, replacing longtime promoter Humpy Wheeler in a controversial transition. In 2015, Smith was promoted to become the SMI's CEO, essentially taking over control of the company from his father.

Under his leadership at SMI, Smith oversaw numerous changes within the company. In 2019, he took SMI off of the New York Stock Exchange, turning the company into a private company. Throughout 2021 and 2022, with monetary assistance from COVID-19 relief grants from North Carolina Governor Roy Cooper, he made efforts to revitalize the North Wilkesboro Speedway, which had been left desolate since the late 1990s when his father bought partial control of the track along with Bob Bahre. He has also directed numerous changes in an attempt to reverse declining attendance at some racetracks, including holding the NASCAR Cup Series' first ever dirt race since 1970 at the Bristol Motor Speedway, ordering the reconfiguration of the Atlanta Motor Speedway to produce pack racing, and by holding a "roval" race at the Charlotte Motor Speedway.

In contrast to his father, Speed Sport writer Keith Waltz considers Marcus to be "not as boisterous or flamboyant". Marcus has drawn praise for a focus on fan experience and interaction and for revitalizing the North Wilkesboro Speedway, one of NASCAR's founding tracks. However, his tenure has seen continued decline at SMI racetracks despite numerous changes formulated to increase attendance, along with criticism from drivers and media outlets for repaves of certain tracks.

== Early life and education ==
Smith was born in Charlotte, North Carolina, on April 11, 1973, to Ollen Bruton Smith (1927–2022) and Bonnie Jean Harris (1947–2023). He is the second-oldest of five children. According to Bruton, his middle name was given as "Graham" to honor Reverend Billy Graham, a famous Southern Baptist evangelist from the Charlotte area.

Smith attended Charlotte Country Day School, where he was a wrestler. In his off time during high school, he worked as a volunteer at the Charlotte Motor Speedway, doing numerous jobs, including grass maintenance, painting walls, and picking up trash. By the summer of 1992, Smith committed to the University of North Carolina at Chapel Hill (UNC) to train as a doctor from 1992 to 1996. However, according to the university, UNC stated that Smith did not earn a degree and dropped out.

== Business career ==
=== Beginnings at Charlotte Motor Speedway ===
According to Marcus, after dropping out of college, he joined the Charlotte Motor Speedway's sales and marketing team as a first-year sales associate, mainly selling souvenir program advertisements and contingency decals for cars. While working at Charlotte Motor Speedway, he frequently came into contact with the track's general manager, Humpy Wheeler, who he later stated on an episode of The Dale Jr. Download that he was "phenomenally impactful" to him. He did not see his father often as his office was located at the nearby Town and Country Ford dealership, owned by Bruton. Marcus initially struggled at the job; within the first six months, he struggled to cover his expenses. When he called Bruton to request a raise, Bruton stated that he could have a raise, and "all you have to do is sell more and you can earn more money". To Marcus, the statement took "a load off my shoulders", as he wanted to "earn [the money]", and did not "want something given to me that I didn't earn or don't deserve". By 1999, he became the speedway's manager of new business development.

On February 19, 2004, he was reassigned to the Charlotte Motor Speedway's parent company, Speedway Motorsports, Inc. (SMI) to serve as the company's executive vice president of sales and marketing. In addition, he was also added to the company's board of directors. By February 2005, he was claimed by the News & Record's Dustin Long as in position to replace Bruton when Bruton retired. Marcus was also stated to "communicate better with NASCAR's leader", Bill France Jr., who at the time had gotten into a fierce lawsuit with Bruton over a second NASCAR Cup Series race date at the Texas Motor Speedway, deepening the rivalry between the Smith and France families. In August of that year, he partnered with the France family's International Speedway Corporation (ISC) for the two companies to buy out Action Performance, a motorsports merchandise company with Smith and Lesa France Kennedy serving on the company's board of directors.

=== Speedway Motorsports ascension ===
On May 21, 2008, Humpy Wheeler announced his departure from the speedway that was later revealed to be due to internal disagreements with Bruton Smith over the last several years, a decision that was seen as a surprise within the NASCAR landscape. By the next day, The Charlotte Observer reported that Smith had become the favorite to replace Wheeler. On May 28, Bruton officially announced that Marcus had been promoted to take over for Wheeler. Along with this, Marcus was also promoted within SMI to become the company's president and chief operating officer (COO). Within his first year, SMI, mainly due to the consequences of the Great Recession, oversaw a sharp decline in revenue and the company's stock price. Smith also oversaw the loss of sponsor Lowe's from Charlotte in 2009, who had naming rights to the speedway over the last decade. The next year, Smith announced the creation of a Christmas lights drive-thru show at the speedway, one of the biggest in the country at the time. By the end of that year, The Charlotte Observer writer Ron Stodghill wrote in an opinion piece that "the guy seems to have a surprisingly firm grip at the wheel... [he] is emerging as a passionate leader". In 2011, Smith directed the construction of a 200 foot by 80 foot television screen on the speedway's backstretch, one of the biggest HD screens in the world.

==== Promotion to CEO, unsuccessful attempt at Charlotte MLS expansion team ====
In February 2015, Marcus was realigned by SMI's board of directors to take over the position of chief executive officer (CEO), a position that was previously held by Bruton. With the move, he essentially took over control of the company from his father. Later that year, he was criticized for maintaining New Hampshire Motor Speedway general manager Jerry Gappens despite Gappens pleading guilty to a lewdness charge with a 19-year old woman in Gappens' car. According to Smith, he was kept because he had "been with [SMI] a long time with a great record... we consider our co-workers like family. We're extending forgiveness and praying for he and his family, hoping things work out there. And that's what our decision was driven by". The next year, he announced intentions to renovate Charlotte Motor Speedway, along with a statement that said that the Smiths were interested in buying the Carolina Panthers, a National Football League (NFL) team.

In late 2016, Marcus and Bruton made a bid for a Major League Soccer (MLS) expansion team in Charlotte with support from local business leaders. The bid initially proposed demolishing the American Legion Memorial Stadium and the Grady Cole Center to build a new $150 million, 20,000 seat stadium, with the Smiths asking for $50 million each from the city of Charlotte and Mecklenburg County. By January 20, the Smiths lowered their asking price for both parties to $43.75 million each, with the Smiths now pledging to invest $87.5 million. While the Mecklenburg County Council approved their funding on January 26 with a 5–3 vote, the proposal drew criticism from the Charlotte City Council and Jim McPhilliamy, who owned the Charlotte Independence, a minor league soccer team. By January 31, the MLS's deadline for new bids passed with the city of Charlotte refusing to hold a vote on the matter. However, despite this, Mecklenburg County still wanted to decide to pledge nearly $120 million into the bid, albeit plans on future county spending were still under negotiation.

Four months later, on May 28, The Charlotte Observer reported that no further progress was made between the Smiths and the city of Charlotte, with the Smiths instead relying on the county government's funding plan. On June 12, Mecklenburg County delayed their decision until at least August, with some county commissioners hesitant to vote for the funding unless the city supported it. By the end of June, The Charlotte Observer reported a reinvigorated marketing effort from Marcus, with Marcus directing the creation of a campaign website. In mid-July, MLS officials toured Charlotte over several days; however, both city council and county commissioners canceled their meetings during the tour. At the same time, a rival bid from neighboring city Raleigh was also made with state government support, with both cities appearing on a 12-city shortlist. On August 3, the Mecklenburg County Council voted against the $120 million contribution, deferring the issue to the city of Charlotte, with the city giving $30 million being "far from certain". Later that month, the city declined to vote on the issue. On October 24, Katherine Peralta of The Charlotte Observer reported that the effort was "officially dead" as an agreement for a combination of private and public could not be reached by December, the deadline for the MLS. By November 30, when the MLS narrowed its shortlist to four cities, Charlotte did not appear, officially killing the Smiths' bid.

=== Battling declining attendance and revenue, revitalization of North Wilkesboro Speedway ===
Throughout the latter half of the 2010s, SMI, along with NASCAR overall, saw a major decrease in attendance and revenue in most racetracks. As a result, over the next several years, Smith directed numerous changes in an attempt to increase both aspects. In 2017, Smith directed the repave of the Texas Motor Speedway in response to water drainage issues. The next year, Smith announced that the fall NASCAR race weekend for the Charlotte Motor Speedway would be run on a specialized "roval" course that utilized both the traditional oval and the track's infield road course instead of running on the traditional oval, breaking an annual tradition that started in 1960. The first race at the new track was met with praise, including from driver Dale Earnhardt Jr. and outside media outlets. In the next few years, Texas faced mounting criticism for its racing product along with and declining attendance. In an attempt to reverse this, Smith moved the NASCAR All-Star Race from its longtime home in Charlotte to Texas. The decision was met with relative scorn, and after two All-Star races that were viewed as subpar and controversial by drivers and media outlets in addition to criticism for the track's general racing product, the race was moved in 2023 despite Smith defending the racing product at Texas. In 2021, Smith announced the repave of the Atlanta Motor Speedway to produce pack racing, the first intermediate track to ever be tailored to produce it. The decision was also met with criticism, particularly from drivers due to a lack of driver input. Before this, Smith announced a proposal to build a $1 billion casino complex at the Atlanta Motor Speedway in 2019; although, this plan has not materialized as the Georgia General Assembly has not passed any law to legalize gambling in the state of Georgia as of March 2023.

In 2019, various NASCAR personalities, most notably driver Dale Earnhardt Jr., made a grassroots effort to petition Smith to revitalize the North Wilkesboro Speedway, one of NASCAR's founding tracks which had been left abandoned and desolate since Bruton bought the a share of the track's ownership in 1996. By early 2021, Smith stated on an episode of The Dale Jr. Download that he had not "forgotten about North Wilkesboro", later clarifying that while he hoped to renovate the track, he couldn't guarantee a renovation deal or the inclusion of any NASCAR races if the track was to be renovated. Later that year, Roy Cooper, the Governor of North Carolina, considered an economic package as part of a COVID-19 relief program that would have given $10 million to Wilkes County, North Carolina, for the speedway. By the time the plan was accepted in November, the amount increased to $18 million. With the new funds, Smith announced that the renovation was more feasible and achievable. By April 2022, Smith announced the return of grassroots racing to the speedway in the summer that year, with a NASCAR Cup Series race announced later that year that was to run in 2023. The movement was met with relative praise from North Carolina state officials, locals, drivers, and fans.

=== Part-owner of the CARS Tour ===
On July 15, 2026, it was announced that Marcus Smith and Speedway Motorsports (SMI) were added to the ownership group to the CARS Tour.

== Personal life ==
=== Marriage ===
Marcus married Cassandra Anne Mitchell on June 8, 1996, in Charlotte, North Carolina at the Central Church of God.

=== Religious views ===
Smith considers himself a devout Christian. In an interview with motorsports journalist Jeff Gluck, he claims that his most important philosophical belief at Speedway Motorsports "is to love one another [like Jesus said]... I want to have everybody who works with us feel like they're in a place where they're loved". Smith in his childhood had also considered becoming a pastor before pursuing a career in motorsports.

== Influence ==
Marcus, compared to his father, Bruton Smith, has been described as "not as boisterous or flamboyant" by Speed Sport writer Keith Waltz. Darrell Waltrip, a longtime NASCAR driver, has praised Smith with his leadership, stating in 2015, "I think he knows what it takes to put on a good show and put on a good race. He really has matured in that job." He has drawn praise for a focus on fan experience at SMI's tracks, with NASCAR journalist Jeff Gluck remarking, "fans feel so comfortable engaging Smith in conversation when he walks around an SMI track that he has been known to run late for his official duties... And during internal meetings, Smith will sometimes instruct employees to make whatever decision is best for the customers".

=== Criticism ===
Smith, along with SMI leadership in general, have drawn criticism from drivers for numerous decisions; mainly regarding repaves of certain tracks, including the Texas Motor Speedway and the Atlanta Motor Speedway, with accusations of "no driver input". When the Texas Motor Speedway was repaved under Smith's direction in early 2017, the track was heavily criticized over the next few years for a poor racing product and at points, controversial races. By September 2022, numerous drivers had spoken out. After the 2022 Autotrader EchoPark Automotive 500, Kyle Larson expressed frustration, stating the track "needs more than a repave. I would like them to demolish [Texas]... [SMI] did a very poor job, with the initial reconfiguration". When the Atlanta Motor Speedway was announced to be repaved to tailor to produce pack racing, Denny Hamlin stated in a Twitter post, "[SMI] has reconfigured Texas, Kentucky, Bristol with 0 driver input. One of those lost a race, other one we don’t race anymore and last one we put dirt over it. But hey, what do the drivers know".

Hamlin later criticized Smith in Twitter posts for a repave on the Sonoma Raceway in 2024, which had seen the newly-paved asphalt in the track's 11th turn come apart. The two proceeded to trade insults at each other at approximately midnight EST, with Smith insulting Hamlin's lack of NASCAR Cup Series championships and Hamlin accusing that Smith was "blow[ing] everything Bruton Smith gave him".
