= Sonic Automotive =

American automotive retailing company

Sonic Automotive, Inc.
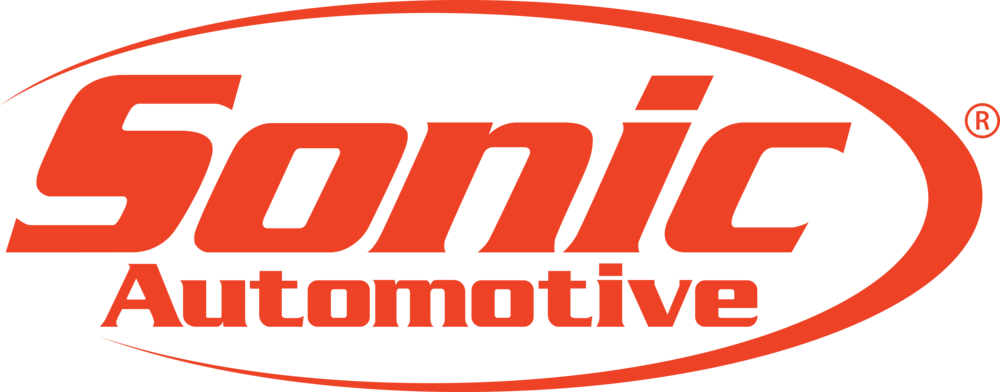
- Type: Public
- Traded as: NYSE: SAH (Class A); S&P 600 component
- Industry: Automotive
- Founded: January 1, 1997
- Founder: Ollen Bruton Smith
- Headquarters: Charlotte, North Carolina, U.S.
- Key people: David Smith (Chairman of the Board) (CEO); Jeff Dyke (President); Heath Byrd (CFO)
- Revenue: ▲US$15.2 billion (2025)
- Net income: ▼US$119 million (2025)
- Number of employees: 10,200 (2021)
- Subsidiaries: EchoPark Automotive
- Website: ir.sonicautomotive.com

Sonic Automotive is a Fortune 500 company based in Charlotte, North Carolina, and is the fifth largest automotive retailer in the United States as measured by total revenues. The company was founded by O Bruton Smith and completed its initial public offering on the NYSE in 1997.

Sonic Automotive operates in 24 states with more than 100 dealerships representing over 25 different brands of automobiles. The dealerships market new and used cars, replacement parts and vehicle maintenance, as well as collision repair services.

== History ==
Sonic Automotive was launched as a public company in November 1997 by O Bruton Smith. At the time, the company had 20 stores, representing 15 brands and several hundred employees. The Smith family holds over 30% of the total shares outstanding but has over 80% of the voting power because of a dual-class structure with Super-voting stock.

Sonic ranked 300th on the 2022 Fortune 500 list. The company also is a member of the Russell 2000 Index.

== EchoPark Automotive ==
Sonic Automotive owns EchoPark Automotive, a used car dealership chain also based in Charlotte. EchoPark allows customers to look up competitors' prices on mobile devices located throughout the stores.

The first EchoPark location opened in the Thornton area of Denver, Colorado in 2014. A location in Centennial was later opened along with a store in Colorado Springs. In September 2017, EchoPark purchased driversselect, a Dallas area dealership, which is now part of the EchoPark brand. EchoPark Automotive operates in 21 states across the United States with over 40 locations as of September 2021.

EchoPark facilities are constructed with sustainable building technologies and some locations are LEED certified.

== Sales and acquisitions ==
In 2001, Sonic made its entrance into the Oklahoma City market with the purchase of Boyd Chevrolet and Steve Bailey Honda.

In 2002, Sonic acquired the sixteen-location Michigan-based Don Massey Dealerships. This brought the company to 134 total locations, making it the second-largest automotive retailer at the time. The acquisition also brought Sonic to 23 total Cadillac dealerships, representing between 5-7% of the brand's total revenue.

In July 2003, Sonic agreed to purchase eighteen dealerships, including the Momentum Automotive Group in Houston, Texas. Sonic's presence in the Houston area had traditionally been with domestic brands, but the acquisition of Momentum added BMW, Jaguar, and Audi brands to the company's portfolio. This sale also represented the first direct acquisition of a Saturn franchise by a retail automotive group, with the purchase of two Bay Area Saturn stores.

Sonic purchased two dealerships from PPE Houston in January 2007. The acquisition of the Land Rover and Jaguar stores brought Sonic to 173 franchises and 37 collision repair centers.

Sonic halted its acquisition strategy during the Great Recession but returned to acquiring new locations in order to drive growth in 2013.

In November 2014, Sonic traded one of its Don Massey Cadillac locations in Lone Tree, CO, to the Denver-based John Elway Automotive Group in exchange for the John Elway Chevrolet location and the associated real estate. The trade came about as a way for the brand to acquire a strong-performing Chevrolet franchise, as well as a plot of land beside the dealership on which the new Murray Imports BMW location could be built.

Sonic purchased the four AutoMatch USA used car locations in Florida and Georgia in 2016. These locations were rebranded under Sonic's EchoPark brand.

In October 2017, Sonic sold its Capitol Chevrolet & Hyundai franchise in Columbia, SC to the Stivers Automotive Group.

In May 2018, Sonic sold its Lone Star Ford franchise in Houston, TX to the Doggett Auto Group. The store was renamed Doggett Ford and moved into a new facility alongside Doggett's John Deere equipment dealership.

Sonic sold two dealerships to Graham Holdings in February 2019. The Lexus of Rockville store was renamed Ourisman Lexus of Rockville, as Graham has partnered with Chris Ourisman, president of the Ourisman Auto Group, to manage the locations. The Honda location in Vienna, Virginia, has been renamed Ourisman Honda of Tysons Corner.

In December 2021, Sonic acquired RFJ Auto Partners, a top 15 dealership group with approximately $3.2 billion in total annual revenues, adding 33 locations in six states to the Sonic Automotive portfolio.

Sonic acquired two franchises throughout 2022, the first being Sun Chevrolet in Chittenango, New York coming in January, and the second, Audi Owings Mills coming aboard in August.

In February 2023, Sonic Automotive acquired the Black Hills Harley-Davidson franchise in Rapid City, South Dakota, home of the Sturgis Motorcycle Rally. The Audi of New Orleans dealership was added to the Sonic portfolio in December of 2024.
