= NASCAR Scene =

Magazine

- Categories: Sports
- Frequency: Weekly
- Founded: 1976
- Final issue: January 6, 2010
- Company: Street & Smith Sports
- Country: United States
- Based in: Charlotte, North Carolina
- Language: English
- ISSN: 1549-4829

NASCAR Scene (originally Grand National Scene and later Winston Cup Scene) was a weekly magazine about NASCAR stock car racing. It was established in North Carolina in 1976 and lasted until January 2010, making it one of the oldest NASCAR-specific publications at the time of this final issue. NASCAR Scene had a sister publication, NASCAR Illustrated, a monthly NASCAR lifestyle magazine, that was published until August 2016.

Robert Griggs, founder of the magazine, sold it to American City Business Journals in 1992, where it became part of Street & Smith's sports division.

NASCAR Scene announced it would cease its weekly publication on January 5, 2010, terminating the employment of most of its editorial staff the same day. Notable writers let go included Jeff Gluck, Steve Waid, Mike Hembree, Lee Montgomery, Rea White, Jared Turner, and Art Weinstein. The last issue was published in December 2009. Much of the content in Scene was merged into NASCAR Illustrated, which was enhanced with additional coverage Nationwide Series and Camping World Truck Series.

All rights belong American City Business Journals. A special Grand National Scene was part of the 2019 NASCAR throwback weekend at Darlington Raceway in Darlington, South Carolina. In celebration of the annual Throwback Weekend, the magazine featured original commentary from Rick Houston, Steve Waid, Deb Williams, Jeff Owens, and Kenny Bruce, along with actual archived Scene results from the publication.

== NASCAR Scene staff ==
- Phil Cavali (Virginia Tech basketball)
- David Exum
- Jeff Gluck (Now writes for The Athletic)
- David Griffin
- Mike Hembree (Now writes for USA Today)
- Lee Montgomery
- Bob Pockrass (Now writes for Fox Sports)
- Jared Turner (Now writes for Heavy.com)
- Steve Waid
- Kris Johnson
- Ben White
- Rea White
- Sam Cranston
- Shea Alexander
- Susanne Corrado
- Scott Greig
- Jeff Owens (now the editor at Sports Collectors Digest)
- Mark Sluder
- Art Weinstein
- Tom Stinson (Now edits for SportsBusiness Journal)
- Deb Williams
- Tom Jensen (Now Manager, Curatorial Affairs at the NASCAR Hall of Fame)
- Rick Houston
- Chad Fletcher
- Jim Fluharty
- Tim Wilcox
- Gene Granger
- Gary McCredie
- Joe Whitlock
