= Simpson (name) =

Origin
- Meaning: "Son of Simme"
- Region of origin: England and Scotland

Other names
- Variant form: Simson

Simpson is an English and Scottish patronymic surname from the medieval masculine given name 'Simme', a medieval variant of 'Simon'. The earliest public record of the name was in 1353 in Staffordshire, England.

== Notable people with the surname ==
=== A ===
- Aaron Simpson (disambiguation), several people
- Adam Simpson (born 1976), Australian rules footballer
- Adele Simpson (1903–1995), American child performer and fashion designer
- Adrian Simpson (born 1971), British TV presenter
- Adrienne Simpson (1943–2010), New Zealand broadcaster, historian, musicologist and writer
- Al Simpson (1916–1976), American football coach
- Alan Simpson (disambiguation), several people
- Albert Benjamin Simpson (1843–1919), Canadian evangelist
- Alex Simpson (1924–2008), Scottish soccer player
- Alexander Simpson (disambiguation), several people
- A. W. B. Simpson (Alfred, 1931–2011), British legal historian
- Alfred Allen Simpson (1875–1939), South Australian industrialist
- Alfred Edward Simpson (1868–1940), South Australian architect
- Alfred Muller Simpson (1843–1917), South Australian industrialist
- Allan Simpson (born 1977), baseball player
- Alli Simpson (born 1998), Australian singer
- Allyson Simpson (born 2000), American ice hockey player
- Amanda Simpson (born 1961), American civil servant
- Andrew Simpson (disambiguation), several people
  - Andrew Simpson (animal trainer) (born 1966/1967), Scottish animal trainer
  - Andrew Simpson (sailor) (1976–2013), British sailor
  - Andrew Simpson (actor) (born 1989), Irish actor
  - Andrew Clive Simpson, British computer scientist
- Ann Marie Simpson (born 1980), American violinist
- Anna Simpson (born 1985), American actress and singer
- Anne Simpson (born 1956), Canadian poet
- Ant Simpson (born 19??), Australian radio host, TV presenter and voiceover artist
- Anthony Simpson (1935–2022), British MEP
- Archibald Simpson (1790–1847), Scottish architect
- Archibald Henry Simpson (1843–1918), Australian judge
- Archie Simpson (1866–1955), Scottish golfer, golf course designer and club maker
- Arnold Simpson (born 1952), American politician in Kentucky
- Ashlee Simpson, American pop singer; sister of Jessica Simpson

=== B ===
- Bart Simpson (filmmaker) (born 19??), Canadian producer and director
- Becky Simpson (born 1986), British actress, writer and musician
- Ben Simpson (1878–1964), Canadian football player
- Bill and Billy Simpson (disambiguation), multiple people
  - Bill Simpson (actor) (1931–1986), Scottish actor
  - Bill Simpson (racing driver) (1940–2019), American racecar driver and founder of Simpson Performance Products
  - Bill Simpson (American football) (born 1951), American football defensive backer
  - Billy Simpson (footballer, born 1878) (1878–1962), English football player for Sunderland and Lincoln City
  - Billy Simpson (singer) (born 1987), Indonesian singer-songwriter
- Bob and Bobby Simpson (disambiguation), multiple people
  - Bob R. Simpson, American business executive, Major League Baseball Texas Rangers co-owner
  - Bob Simpson (Canadian football) (1930–2007), CFL football player
  - Bob Simpson (cricketer) (1936–2025), Australian cricketer
  - Bob Simpson (journalist) (1944–2006), foreign correspondent for the BBC
  - Bob Simpson (British Columbia politician) (born 1956 or 1957), member of Legislative Assembly of British Columbia
  - Bobby Simpson (ice hockey) (born 1956), Canadian NHL ice hockey player
- Brandon Simpson (born 1981), American sprinter who represents Bahrain
- Brett Simpson (born 1985), American surfer
- Brian Simpson (disambiguation), several people
- Britney Simpson (born 1996), American pair skater
- Bruce Simpson (athlete) (born 1950), Canadian pole vaulter
- Bruce Simpson (blogger) (born 19??), New Zealand blogger

=== C ===
- Cam Simpson (born 19??), American journalist
- Carl Simpson (born 1970), American footballer
- Carlos Simpson (born 1962), American mathematician
- Carole Simpson (born 1941), American news presenter and author
- Cather Simpson, New Zealand chemistry and physics professor
- Chandler Simpson (born 2000), American baseball player
- Charles and Charlie Simpson (disambiguation), multiple people
  - Charles Torrey Simpson (1846–1932), American biologist
  - Charles Walter Simpson (Canadian artist) (1878–1942), Canadian artist and illustrator
  - Charles Walter Simpson (English artist) (1885–1971), English painter
  - Charles Ralph Simpson III (born 1945), United States federal judge
  - Charlie Simpson (footballer) (1861–1???), English soccer player
  - Charlie Simpson, English singer of the British rock bands Fightstar and Busted
  - Charlie Simpson (fundraiser), 7-y.o. British Haiti earthquake relief fundraiser
- Chris Simpson (disambiguation), Chris, Christine and Christopher Simpson, multiple people
  - Chris Simpson (cricketer) (born 1982), Australian cricketer
  - Chris Simpson (squash player) (born 1987), British squash player
  - Christine Simpson (born 1964), Canadian television presenter
  - Christopher Simpson (musician) (c.1604–1669), English composer and musician
  - Christopher Simpson (actor) (born 1975), Irish actor
- Claire Simpson (born 19??), British film editor
- Cleave Simpson, American politician
- Clement Pearson Simpson (1868–1948), English rugby union player
- Cody Simpson (born 1997), Australian singer
- Colin Simpson (disambiguation), multiple people
  - Colin Hall Simpson (1894–1964), Australian general
  - Colin M. Simpson (born 1959), American politician
  - Colin Simpson (Canadian author) (born 19??), Canadian software developer and author of textbooks
- Coreen Simpson (born 1942), American photographer and jewelry designer
- Corelli C. W. Simpson (1837–1???), American poet, cookbook author, painter
- Craig Simpson (born 1967), Canadian ice hockey player
- Craig Simpson (footballer) (born 19??), New Zealand international football (soccer) player
- Cuthbert Simpson (1892–1969), Anglican Dean of Christchurch, Oxford, 1959–1969

=== D ===
- Dana Simpson (born 1977), cartoonist
- Daniel and Danny Simpson (disambiguation), multiple people
  - Daniel H. Simpson (1939–2022), American diplomat
  - Daniel R. Simpson (1927–2015), American politician
  - Danny Simpson (early footballer) (fl. 1896–1903), English footballer
  - Danny Simpson (born 1987), English footballer
- Darren Simpson (born 1978), South African radio presenter
- David Simpson (disambiguation), several people
  - Dave Simpson (ice hockey) (born 1962), Canadian ice hockey player
  - Dave Simpson (soccer) (born 1983), Canadian soccer player
  - David Simpson (priest) (1745–1799), English priest
  - David Simpson (Canadian politician) (1911–1965), Canadian politician
  - David Simpson (artist) (born 1928), American artist
  - David Simpson (Northern Ireland politician) (born 1959), Democratic Unionist Party politician in Northern Ireland
  - David Simpson (Texas politician) (born 1961), Texas Representative
  - David Simpson (Irish cricketer) (born 1983), Irish cricketer
- Dawson Simpson (born 1989), Australian rules footballer
- Dean Simpson (born 1950), American politician and businessman in Minnesota
- Deborah Simpson (born 19??), American politician in Maine
- Dennis Simpson (1919–2002), English footballer
- Derek Simpson (cellist) (1928–2007), English cellist
- Derek Simpson (trade unionist) (born 1944), British trade union leader
- Diamon Simpson (born 1987), American player in the Israel Basketball Premier League
- Dick Simpson (born 1943), American baseball player
- Dillon Simpson (born 1993), Canadian ice hockey player
- Don Simpson (1943–1996), American film producer
- Don Simpson (cartoonist) (born 1961), American comic book artist
- Donna Simpson (internet personality) (born 1967)
- Donna Simpson (musician) (born 19??), member of Australian folk rock band The Waifs
- Dorothy Simpson (1933–2020), British author
- Douglas Simpson (born 1982), Scottish field hockey forward
- Dudley Simpson (1922–2017), Australian television composer
- Duke Simpson (1927–2021), American baseball player

=== E ===
- Eber Simpson (politician) (1863–1919), American politician
- Eber Simpson (1895–1964), American football player
- Ebony Simpson (died 1992), female Australian murder victim
- Edmund Simpson (1784–1848), English actor and theatre manager
- Edward Simpson (disambiguation), multiple people
  - Edward Simpson (forger) (1815–1???), British geologist and forger
  - Edward Simpson (naval officer) (1824–1888), officer in the U.S. Navy
  - Edward Simpson (cricketer) (1867–1944), English cricketer
  - Edward Sydney Simpson (1875–1939), Australian mineralogist and geochemist
  - Edward Simpson (governor), Naval commandant and 20th Naval Governor of Guam
  - Edward A. Simpson (1892–19??), British World War I flying ace
  - Edward H. Simpson (1922–2019), British statistician
- Edwin Simpson (1909–1973), English footballer
- Eli Simpson (1884–1962), British caver and speleologist
- Eliyahu Simpson (1889–1976), rabbi
- Elizabeth Inchbald née Simpson (1753–1821), English novelist, actress and dramatist
- Elizabeth Simpson (biologist) (born 19??), British biologist
- Elliott Simpson (born 1976), English footballer
- Eric Simpson (born 19??), American basketball coach
- Erik Simpson (born 19??), American politician in Idaho
- Ernest Aldrich Simpson (1897–1958), shipping executive; husband of Wallis, Duchess of Windsor
- Evelyn M. Simpson (1885–1963), English literary critic and scholar

=== F ===
- Fiona Simpson (born 1965), Australian politician
- Florence Simpson (1874–1956), British army officer
- Frances Simpson (ca. 1857–1926), English writer, journalist, cat show judge, and cat breeder
- Frank Simpson (disambiguation), multiple people
  - Frank W. Simpson (1872–1929), America college football coach
  - Frank B. Simpson (1883–1966), American architect
  - Frank Simpson (British Army officer) (1899–1986), British Army General
  - Frank Simpson (cricketer) (1909–1992), British Army officer and cricketer
- Fred, Freddy and Frederick Simpson (disambiguation), multiple people
  - Fred Simpson (politician) (1886–1939), British Labour Party politician, MP for Ashton-under-Lyne 1935–1939
  - Freddy Simpson (1883 – after 1907), English footballer for Lincoln City
  - Frederick Moore Simpson (1855–1928), English architect, architectural historian and professor
  - Frederick Simpson (athlete) (1878–1945), Canadian long-distance runner
  - Frederick Simpson (boxer) (1916–1975), British boxer

=== G ===
- Gary Simpson (footballer born 1959), English footballer
- Gary Simpson (footballer born 1961), English footballer and manager
  - Garry Simpson (1914–2011), American director, writer and producer
- Geoff Simpson (born 19??), American politician in Washington State
- Geoffrey Simpson (born 19??), Australian cinematographer
- George Simpson (disambiguation), several people including:
  - Sir George Simpson (businessman) (c. 1792–1860), explorer and administrator of the Hudson's Bay Company
  - George Buchan Simpson (1820–1892), Scottish art collector, connoisseur and patron of Scottish painters
  - George Bowen Simpson (1838–1915), politician and judge in New South Wales, Australia
  - George Simpson (Canadian politician) (1858–1906), politician in Prince Edward Island, Canada
  - George W. Simpson (1870–1951), New York politician and judge
  - George Simpson (footballer, born 1876) (1876–1955), English football player for Doncaster Rovers and Chesterfield
  - George Clarke Simpson (1878–1965), meteorologist for Scott's Antarctic expedition
  - George Goodman Simpson (1896–1990), Australian flying ace
  - George Gaylord Simpson (1902–1984), American paleontologist
  - George Simpson (sprinter) (1908–1961), American runner
  - George Simpson, Baron Simpson of Dunkeld (born 1942), British politician
- Gerald Simpson (born 1967), British musician known as A Guy Called Gerald, former member of 808 State
- Gerard Simpson (1886–1957), Scottish cricketer for Kent and Argentina
- Gerry Simpson (born 19??), Scottish-born Australian law professor
- Gil Simpson (born 1948), New Zealand businessman
- Gilbert Murray Simpson (1869–1954), English architect based in Brighton
- Glenn Simpson (field hockey) (born 1987), Australian hockey player
- Glenn R. Simpson, American journalist and political researcher
- Gord Simpson (1928–2019), Canadian ice hockey player
- Gordon Simpson (Australian politician) (1929–2017), Australian politician
- Gordon Simpson (judge) (1894–1987), Justice of the Supreme Court of Texas
- Gordon Simpson (rugby union) (born 1971), New Zealand-born rugby player
- Grace Simpson (1920–2007), British archaeologist

=== H ===
- Habbie Simpson (1550–1620), Scottish piper
- Hack Simpson (Harold Alfred Simpson, 1910–1978), Canadian ice hockey player
- Harold Simpson (cricketer) (1879–1924), English cricketer
- Harold Bullet Joe Simpson (1893–1973), Canadian ice hockey player
- Harry Simpson (disambiguation), multiple people
  - Harry Simpson (1925–1979), American baseball player
  - Harry Simpson (footballer, born 1869), Scottish footballer for Stoke
  - Harry Simpson (English footballer) (born 1875), English footballer for Crewe Alexandra and Stoke
  - Harry Simpson (footballer, born 1888), Scottish footballer for Leicester Fosse
- Harvey Simpson (1862–1928), Canadian politician in Manitoba
- Hazel Simpson née Robson (born 1979), British Paralympian athlete
- Heather Simpson (disambiguation), multiple people
- Helen Simpson (disambiguation), multiple people
  - Helen Macdonald Simpson (1890–1960), New Zealand teacher, university lecturer and writer
  - Helen de Guerry Simpson (1897–1940), Australian novelist
  - Helen Simpson (author) (born 1959), British short story writer
- Heli Simpson, Australian actress and singer
- Henry Simpson (disambiguation) multiple people
  - Henry Simpson (shipping) (1815–1884), merchant and ship owner in South Australia
  - Henry Lakin Simpson (1859–1881), United States Navy sailor and Medal of Honor recipient
  - Henry Simpson (Toronto) (1864–1926), architect active in Toronto, Ontario
  - Henry Simpson (Poets' Club founder) (died 1939), London banker
- Herbert Simpson, English footballer

=== I ===
- Ian Simpson (architect) (born c.1956), English architect
- Ian Simpson (motorcycle racer) (born 1970), Scottish motorcycle road racer
- India Arie Simpson (born 1975), American singer-songwriter, record producer known as India Arie
- Ivan Simpson (1875–1951), Scottish film and theatre actor

=== J ===
- Jack and Jackie Simpson (disambiguation), multiple people
  - Jack Simpson (golfer) (1859–1895), Scottish golfer
  - Jack Simpson (politician) (1929–2015), Australian politician
  - Jackie Simpson (defensive back) (1934–2017), American football defensive back
  - Jackie Simpson (linebacker) (1936–1983), American football linebacker
- Jacqueline Simpson (born 1930), British folklorist and author
- Jake Simpson (born 1990), English soccer player
- James Simpson (disambiguation), multiple people
  - James Simpson (advocate) (1781–1853), Scottish advocate and author
  - James Simpson (civil servant) (c. 1792–1857), early Australian civil servant and property developer
  - James Simpson (British Army officer) (1792–1868), general of the British Army
  - James Simpson (engineer) (1799–1869), British civil engineer
  - James Jenkins Simpson (1881–1936), British zoologist
  - James Young Simpson (1811–1870), Scottish doctor and pioneer in use of chloroform as anaesthetic
  - James H. Simpson (1813–1883), surveyor of the American West for the U.S. Army
  - James Simpson (priest) (1865–1948), Dean of Peterborough, 1928–1942
  - James Young Simpson (scientist) (1873–1934), Scottish professor of natural science and diplomat
  - James Simpson (Canadian politician) (1873–1938), Canadian trade unionist and mayor of Toronto, 1935
  - James Simpson (Australian politician) (1905–1968), member of the New South Wales Legislative Assembly
  - James Simpson, Jr. (1905–1960), U.S. Representative from Illinois
  - James Simpson (explorer) (1911–2002), British polar explorer
  - William James Simpson (born 1954), Australian-American academic commonly known as James Simpson
  - James Simpson (government official) (born 19??), US government official
  - James B. Simpson (died 2002), US journalist and priest, known for Simpson's Contemporary Quotations
- Jamie Simpson (born 1986), Australian rugby league footballer
- Jane Simpson (disambiguation), multiple people
  - Jane Cross Simpson (1811–1886), Scottish hymnist and poet
  - Jane Simpson (artist) (born 1965), English artist
  - Jane Simpson (footballer) (born 1971), New Zealand international football (soccer) player
  - Jane Simpson (solicitor) (born 19??), English lawyer
- Jared Simpson, English rugby league footballer
- Jay Simpson (born 1988), English footballer
- Jaylin Simpson (born 2000), American football player
- Jeanmarie Simpson (born 1959), American peace activist and theatre and film artist
- Jeff Simpson (born 1950), New Zealand tennis player
- Jeffrey Simpson (born 1949), Canadian journalist
- Jemma Simpson (born 1984), British middle-distance runner
- Jennie Simpson (bowls) (born 19??), New Zealand lawn bowls player
- Jennie Simpson (camogie) (born 1987), Irish camogie player
- Jennifer Simpson (born 1986), American middle-distance runner and steeplechaser
- Jenny Simpson (born 1973), American country music singer
- Jerry Simpson (1842–1905), American politician
- Jessica Simpson (disambiguation), several people names Jessica or Jess
- Jesse L. Simpson (1884–1973), American jurist
- Jessica Simpson (born 1980), American pop singer and actress
- Jessie L. Simpson (1882–1974), staff member in the United States Senate
- Jim, Jimbo, Jimmi and Jimmy Simpson (disambiguation), multiple people
  - Jim Simpson (Australian politician) (1905–1968), member of the New South Wales Legislative Assembly
  - Jim Simpson (sportscaster) (1927–2016), American sportscaster
  - Jimmy Simpson (footballer, born 1923) (1923–2010), English footballer
  - Jimbo Simpson (born 19??), Northern Irish Loyalist terrorist
  - Jimmi Simpson (born 1975), American actor
  - Jimmy Simpson (American football) (1899–1962), blocking back in the National Football League
  - Jimmy Simpson (footballer, born 1908) (1908–1972), Scottish international footballer
  - Jimmy Simpson (footballer, born 1923) (1923–2010), English footballer
  - Jimmy Simpson (racing driver) (born 1992), American racing driver
- Jock Simpson (1886–1959), English footballer
- Joe Simpson (disambiguation), several people
  - Joe Simpson (rugby union, born 1856) (1856–1911), English rugby union player for London Wasps
  - Joe Simpson (baseball) (born 1951), American baseball player and broadcaster
  - Joe Simpson (mountaineer) (born 1960), English mountaineer and author
  - Joe Simpson (artist) (born 1984), English artist best known for cinematic oil paintings
  - Joe Simpson (rugby union, born 1988), Australian-born English rugby union player
- John and Johnny Simpson (disambiguation), several people
  - John Simpson (Presbyterian) (1740–1808), of South Carolina, in the American Revolutionary War
  - John Simpson (Unitarian) (1746–1812), of Bath, English Unitarian minister and religious writer
  - John Simpson (soldier) (1748–1825), American Revolutionary War soldier at the Battle of Bunker Hill
  - John Simpson (MP for Wenlock) (1763–1850), English politician, Member of Parliament for Wenlock
  - John Simpson (artist) (1782–1847) British painter who painted The Captive Slave'
  - John Simpson (Quebec politician) (1788–1873), government official and politician in Quebec
  - John Simpson (Canada West politician) (1807–1878), Canadian businessman and politician
  - John Palgrave Simpson (1807–1887), British playwright
  - John Simpson (Ontario politician) (1812–1885), Ontario banker and member of the Senate of Canada
  - John Simpson (VC) (1826–1884), Scottish recipient of the Victoria Cross
  - John Woodruff Simpson (1850–1920), American lawyer and founding partner at Simpson Thacher & Bartlett
  - John A. Simpson (1854–1916), Canadian politician
  - Sir John William Simpson (1858–1933), English architect
  - Sir John Hope Simpson (1868–1961), English administrator in India
  - John Thomas Simpson (1870–1965), Conservative member of the Canadian House of Commons
  - John Simpson Kirkpatrick (1892–1915), Australian World War I war hero of "Simpson and his donkey"
  - John Baird Simpson (1894–1960), Scottish geologist
  - John Milton Bryan Simpson (1903–1987), American judge
  - John Herbert Thomas Simpson (1907–1967), senior RAF officer and Commandant Royal Observer Corps
  - John Wistar Simpson (1914–2007), American electrical engineer
  - John Alexander Simpson (1916–2000), American physicist
  - John Simpson (footballer, born 1918) (1918–2000), English footballer for Huddersfield Town and York City
  - John Simpson (British Army officer) (1927–2007), British Army officer and Director SAS
  - John Simpson (fencer) (1927–2016), Australian Olympic fencer
  - John Simpson (police official) (1932–2017), director of US Secret Service and Interpol
  - John Simpson (footballer, born 1933) (1933–1993), English footballer for Lincoln City and Gillingham
  - John Simpson (priest) (1933–2019), Anglican clergyman
  - John Simpson (journalist) (born 1944), British BBC journalist, foreign correspondent and author
  - John B. Simpson (born 1947), American president of the University at Buffalo
  - John Simpson (journalist/consumer advocate) (born 1948), American consumer rights advocate
  - John Simpson (lexicographer) (born 1953) English Chief Editor of the Oxford English Dictionary
  - John Simpson (architect) (born 1954), British modern-day classical architect
  - John L. Simpson (born 1963), Australian film and theatre producer, writer and distributor
  - John Simpson (boxer) (born 1983), Scottish featherweight boxer
  - John Simpson (English cricketer) (born 1988), English cricketer
  - John Simpson (basketball) (born 19??), British basketball player
  - Johnny Simpson (1922–2010), New Zealand rugby union international
- Jordan Simpson (Australian footballer) (born 1985), Australian soccer player
- Joseph Simpson (disambiguation), several people
  - Joseph Simpson (artist, printmaker) (1879–1939), British painter and etcher
  - Sir Joseph Simpson (politician) (1908–1994), British-born Ugandan politician and businessman
  - Sir Joseph Simpson (police officer) (1909–1968), Commissioner of the London Metropolitan Police, 1958–1968
- Josh Simpson (disambiguation), several people
  - Josh Simpson (glass artist) (born 1949), American glass artist
  - Josh Simpson (Canadian soccer) (born 1983), Canadian soccer player
  - Josh Simpson (English footballer) (born 1987), English footballer
  - Josh Simpson (Australian footballer) (born 1994), Australian rules footballer

=== K ===
- Kade Simpson (born 1984), Australian rules footballer
- Karen Simpson (actress) (born 1975), Canadian actress and fashion designer
- Karl Simpson (born 1976), English footballer
- Keith Simpson (disambiguation), multiple people
  - Keith Simpson (professor) (1907–1985), British pathologist
  - Keith Simpson (politician) (born 1949), British politician, Conservative MP for Broadland
  - Keith Simpson (American football) (born 1956), American football safety
- Keila Simpson (born 1966), Brazilian activist
- Ken Simpson (1938–2014), Australian ornithologist
- Kenneth F. Simpson (1895–1941), American politician
- Kent Simpson (ice hockey, born 1975), Canadian ice hockey left winger
- Kent Simpson (ice hockey, born 1992), Canadian ice hockey goaltender
- Kimberly Hart-Simpson (born 1987), Welsh actress and businesswoman
- KJ Simpson (born 2002), American basketball player
- Ko Simpson (born 1983), American footballer

=== L ===
- Lee Simpson (born 19??), British actor and comedian
- Leonard Jennett Simpson (1882–1940), Canadian politician
- Les Simpson (1894–1968), Australian farmer, soldier and soldier-settlement administrator
- Lilian Simpson (1871–1897), British artist
- Lorena Simpson, Brazilian dance-pop singer
- Louis Simpson (1923–2012), Jamaican-born American poet
- Luke Simpson (born 1994), English footballer
- Lyndell Simpson, Montserratian politician
- Lynn Simpson (born 1971), British slalom canoer

=== M ===
- Maggie Simpson (musician) (born 19??), American singer-songwriter
- Malcolm Simpson (1933–2020), New Zealand Olympic cyclist
- Margaret Simpson (born 1981), Ghanaian heptathlete
- Margaret E. B. Simpson (1906–1964), Scottish archaeologist
- Mark Simpson (disambiguation), multiple people
- Marjorie Simpson (architect) (1924–2003), Australian architect
- Martin Simpson (geologist) (1800–1892), British geologist
- Martin Simpson, English singer/songwriter and guitarist
- Martin I. Simpson (born 19??), English paleontologist
- Marty Simpson (baseball), 19th-century American baseball player
- Mary Simpson (disambiguation), multiple people
  - Mary Elizabeth Simpson (1865–1948), New Zealand religious teacher, healer and writer
  - Mary Simpson (Episcopal priest) (1925–2011), one of the first women to be ordained
  - Mary Simpson (Northern Ireland politician), Unionist politician in Northern Ireland
  - Mary Simpson (violinist), American violinist in Yanni's orchestra
- Mary Theresa Simpson (1951/1952–1964), American murder victim
- Matt Simpson (disambiguation) multiple people, including
  - Matt Simpson (poet) (1936–2009), British poet and literary critic
  - Matt Simpson (racing driver) (born 1981), British racing driver
- Matthew Simpson (1811–1884), American bishop of the Methodist Episcopal Church
- Matthew Simpson (footballer) (born 1967), Australian rules footballer
- Michael Simpson (disambiguation), Michael, Mickey and Mike Simpson, multiple people
  - Michael Simpson (footballer) (born 1974), English football player
  - Michael Simpson (producer), American record producer and member of the electronic group Dust Brothers
  - Mickey Simpson (1913–1985), American TV and film actor
  - Mike Simpson (American football) (born 1947), American football player
  - Mike Simpson (born 1950), U.S. congressman from Idaho
  - Mike Simpson (Michigan politician) (1962–2009), member of the Michigan House of Representatives
  - M. J. Simpson (Mike, born 19??), British movie journalist, author and screenwriter
- Milward L. Simpson (1897–1993), American politician, Governor of Wyoming
- Minnie Cravath Simpson (1860–1945) African-American anti-lynching activist
- Mona Simpson (born 1957), American novelist
- Monica Simpson, American reproductive rights activist

=== N ===
- Nate Simpson (born 1954), American football running back
- Neil Simpson (born 1961), Scottish footballer
- Neil Simpson (boxer) (born 1974), English boxer
- Neil Simpson (alpine skier), British alpine skier
- Nichola Simpson (born 1956), British archer
- Nicholas Simpson (born 1958), composer
- Nicole Brown Simpson (1959–1994), murder victim, ex-wife of O. J. Simpson
- Nigel Simpson (born 1975), Samoan-English rugby union player
- Norm Simpson (1905–1990), Australian rules footballer
- N. F. Simpson (Norman F. Simpson, 1919–2011), British playwright

=== O ===
- O. J. Simpson (1947–2024), American football player, actor, accused of murdering his ex-wife
- Oramel H. Simpson, American politician
- Owen Simpson (born 1943), English footballer

=== P ===
- Pascal Simpson (born 1971), Swedish footballer
- Paul Simpson (disambiguation), multiple people
  - Paul Hardrock Simpson (1904–1978), American ultra distance runner
  - Paul Simpson (footballer) (born 1966), English football player and manager
  - Paul Simpson (musician) (born 19??), musician, vocalist, lyricist and writer from Liverpool, England
- Peggy Simpson (1913–1994), British actress
- Peter Simpson (disambiguation), Pete and Peter Simpson, multiple people
  - Pete Simpson (born 1930), American historian, educator and politician
  - Peter Simpson (Native rights activist) (c. 1871–1947), Tsimshian activist for Alaska Native rights
  - Peter Simpson (Scottish footballer) (1904/05–1974), Scottish football striker
  - Peter Simpson (footballer, born 1940), English footballer who played for Burnley and Bury
  - Peter Simpson (writer) (born 1942), member of the New Zealand Parliament
  - Peter Simpson (footballer, born 1945) (1945–2026), English footballer who played for Arsenal
  - Sir Peter Jeffery Simpson (20th-c.), British; president of the Royal College of Anaesthetists
- Philemon Simpson (1819–1895), American politician and lawyer
- Pollie Hirst Simpson (1871–1947), English sportswoman, charity organiser and the first agricultural adviser to the National Federation of Women's Institutes (WI)
- Portia Simpson-Miller (born 1945), Jamaican prime minister

=== R ===
- R. A. Simpson (1929–2002), Australian poet
- Ray Simpson (VC) (1926–1978), Australian recipient of the Victoria Cross
- Ray Simpson (born 1954), lead singer with Village People
- Rebecca Simpson (footballer) (born 1982), New Zealand international football (soccer) player
- Red Simpson (1934–2016), American country music singer-songwriter
- Reg Simpson (1920–2013), English cricketer
- Reid Simpson (born 1969), Canadian ice hockey player
- Rene Simpson (1966–2013), Canadian tennis player
- Rhona Simpson (born 1972), Scottish field hockey player
  - Richard Simpson (martyr) (c. 1553–1588), English Catholic priest, martyred during the reign of Elizabeth I
  - Richard F. Simpson (1798–1882), U.S. Representative from South Carolina
  - Richard Simpson (writer) (1820–1876), Catholic writer and literary scholar
  - Richard Simpson (rugby union) (c.1885–19??), rugby union player who represented Australia
  - Richard M. Simpson (1900–1960), US Congressman from Pennsylvania
  - Richard Simpson (Scottish politician) (born 1942), Scottish politician
  - Richard Simpson (born 1968), New York-based rapper known as Chubb Rock
  - Richard J. Simpson (born 19??), Australian professor of biochemistry
  - Rick Simpson (born 19??), American set director
  - Rik Simpson (born 19??), British record producer, musician and songwriter
- Robert and Robbie Simpson (disambiguation), multiple people
  - Robert Winthrop Simpson (1799–1887), Rear-Admiral of the Chilean Navy, hero of the War of the Confederation
  - Robert Simpson (brewer), first mayor of Barrie, Ontario and founder of the Robert Simpson Brewing Company
  - Robert Simpson (merchant) (1834–1897), Canadian founder of Simpson's Department Store
  - Robert Kirkpatrick Simpson (1837–1921), member of the New Zealand Legislative Council
  - Robert Simpson (athlete) (1892–1974), American track and field athlete and coach
  - Robert L. Simpson (film editor) (1910–1977), American film editor
  - Robert Simpson (Manitoba politician) (1910–1997), member of the Canadian House of Commons
  - Robert A. Simpson (1910–1998), Alberta politician in Calgary North Hill
  - Robert Simpson (meteorologist) (1912–2014), American meteorologist
  - Robert L. Simpson (Mormon) (1915–2003), American general authority of The Church of Jesus Christ of Latter-day Saints
  - Robert Simpson (composer) (1921–1997), English composer
  - Robert Simpson (Northern Ireland politician) (1923–1997), Northern Irish politician
  - Robert B. Simpson (born 1943), New Brunswick politician
  - Robert Simpson (cricketer) (born 1962), English cricketer
  - Robert Simpson (born 1979) comedian, actor and presenter known as Rufus Hound
  - Robert L. Simpson, Jr. (1946–2020), American artificial intelligence scientist
  - Robbie Simpson (born 1975), Australian rugby league footballer
  - Robbie Simpson (born 1985), English footballer
  - Robbie Simpson (runner) (born 1991), Scottish mountain and long-distance runner
- Roger Simpson (born 1967), English rugby league footballer
- Roland Simpson (1969–2004), Australian base jumper
- Ron Simpson (English footballer) (1934–2010), English footballer
- Ronald Simpson (1962–2014), British guitarist known as Ronny Jordan
- Ronnie Simpson (1930–2004), Scottish football goalkeeper
- R. A. Simpson (Ronald Albert Simpson, 1929–2002), Australian poet and artist
- Rose Simpson (born 1946), British musician (Incredible String Band) and Mayoress of Aberystwyth
- Russell Simpson (actor) (1880–1959), American character actor
- Russell Simpson (tennis) (born 1954), New Zealand tennis player
- Ruth Simpson (disambiguation), multiple people

=== S ===
- Sarah Simpson (died 1739), Colonial American executed for the murder of her child
- Scott Simpson (disambiguation), multiple people
  - Scott Simpson (golfer) (born 1955), PGA Tour golfer
  - Scott Simpson (politician) (born 1959), New Zealand National Party MP
  - Scott Simpson (pole vaulter) (born 1979), Welsh pole-vaulter
- Sean Simpson (born 1960), Canadian ice hockey player and coach
- Sean Simpson (footballer) (born 1970), Australian rules footballer
- Shane Simpson (born 19??), Canadian politician in British Columbia
- Shane Simpson (born 19??), Canadian musician
- Shaun Simpson (wrestler) (born 1966), South African wrestler
- Shaun Simpson (motorcyclist) (born 1988), Scottish motocross racer
- Shawn Simpson (1968–2025), Canadian ice hockey player and on-air personality
- Sherone Simpson (born 1984), Jamaican athlete
- Sid Simpson (1894–1958), American politician
- Steve Simpson (disambiguation), Stephen and Steve Simpson, multiple people
  - Stephen Simpson (writer) (1789–1854), American author
  - Stephen Simpson (doctor) (1793–1869), Australian pioneer
  - Stephen Simpson (born 1984), South African racing driver
  - Steve Simpson (baseball) (1948–1989), Major League Baseball pitcher
  - Steve Simpson (wrestler) (born 1963), South African wrestler
  - Steve Simpson (rugby league) (born 1979), Australian rugby league player

=== T ===
- Terry Simpson (born 1938), English footballer
- Terry Simpson (born 1943), Canadian ice hockey player and coach
- Thomas Simpson (disambiguation), multiple people
  - Thomas Simpson (composer) (1582–c.1628), English composer
  - Thomas Simpson (1710–1761), English mathematician, FRS
  - Thomas Simpson (engineer) (1755–1823), British civil engineer
  - Thomas Simpson (explorer) (1808–1840), explorer with the Hudson's Bay Company
  - Thomas Simpson (architect, born 1825) (1825–1908), Scottish architect based in Brighton
  - Thomas Simpson (footballer) (1933–2016), Australian footballer
- Tim Simpson (born 1956), American golfer
- Tim Simpson (American football) (born 1969), American football player
- Todd Simpson (born 1973), Canadian ice hockey player
- Tom and Tommy Simpson (disambiguation), multiple people
  - Tom Simpson (footballer) (1880–19??), early soccer player
  - Tom Simpson (1937–1967), British cyclist
  - Tom Simpson (ice hockey) (born 1952), Canadian ice hockey player
  - Tom Simpson (musician) (born 1972), Scottish musician, keyboard player for the band Snow Patrol
  - Tommy Simpson (footballer) (1931–2015), Scottish football defender active in the 1950s
- Tony Simpson (born 1965), Australian politician
- Trenton Simpson (born 2001), American football player
- Ty Simpson (born 2002), American football player
- Tyler Simpson (1985–2011), Australian soccer player

=== V ===
- Valerie Simpson (born 1946), American singer/songwriter, member Ashford & Simpson
- Vi Simpson (born 1946), American politician in Indiana
- Victor Simpson (born 1960), New Zealand rugby union footballer
- Vikki Thorn (née Simpson), member, Australian band The Waifs

=== W ===
- Wallis Simpson (1896–1986), (Wallis, Duchess of Windsor)
- "Walter Simpson", alias of Arthur Evans (VC) (1891–1936), English Victoria Cross recipient
- Warren Simpson (c.1922–1980), Australian snooker player
- Wayne Simpson (born 1948), American baseball player
- Wayne Simpson (ice hockey) (born 1989), American ice hockey player
- Webb Simpson (born 1985), American professional golfer and 2012 US Open champion
- Wilbur Simpson (1917–1997), American bassoonist
- Will C. Simpson, mayor of Ashland, Kentucky 1936–1940
- Will Simpson (equestrian) (born 1959), American Olympic show jumper
- Will Simpson (comics) (born 19??), Northern Irish comic book illustrator
- William Simpson (portrait artist) (c.1818 – 1872) African American artist and civil right activist
- William Simpson (Scottish artist) (1823–1899), Scottish war artist and correspondent
- William Simpson (Australian judge) (1894–1966), Australian Supreme Court judge
- William Simpson (rugby league), rugby league footballer who played in the 1900s, and 1910s
- W. Douglas Simpson (William, 1896–1968), Scottish architecture and archaeology academic and writer
- William Dunlap Simpson (1823–1890), Governor of South Carolina from 1879
- William Gayley Simpson (1892–1991), American white nationalist and author
- William Hood Simpson (1888–1980), US general who commanded the US Ninth Army in Europe in World War II
- William John Simpson (1851–1901), journalist and political figure in Quebec
- William Kelly Simpson (1928–2017), American professor emeritus of Egyptology and archaeology
- William James Simpson (born 1954), Australian academic
- William R. Simpson (born 1966), Alaskan chemist
- William T. Simpson (1886–1980), New York politician

== Fictional characters ==
=== The Simpsons ===
- The Simpson family from American animated television series The Simpsons:
  - Abraham Simpson
  - Bart Simpson
  - Homer Simpson
  - Lisa Simpson
  - Maggie Simpson
  - Marge Simpson

=== Other ===
- Andrew Simpson (Neighbors), from the soap opera Neighbours
- Archie "Snake" Simpson, in the Degrassi franchise
- Bobby Simpson (Home and Away), soap opera character
- Bonnie, Doug, and Katie Simpson, characters in 1989 movie She's Out of Control
- Frank Simpson, supervillain in the Marvel Universe known as Nuke (Marvel Comics)
- Ralph Waldo Simpson, from the American TV sitcom Gimme a Break!
- Roxanne Simpson, supporting character of Marvel Comics' Ghost Rider
- Samantha "Sam" Simpson, one of the three main characters of the animated television series Totally Spies!
- Sophie Simpson, from the soap opera Home and Away

== See also ==
- Simson (name)
- Simpsons (department store), Canadian department store chain
- Simpson River, Chilean river
- Simpson River (British Columbia), river in British Columbia
- Simpson River National Reserve, national reserve in southern Chile
- Bryan Simpson United States Courthouse, courthouse and federal government facility in Jacksonville, Florida
- Clara Simpson Three-Decker, historic house in Worcester, Massachusetts
- Hope Simpson Enquiry, British Commission addressing immigration and settlement in British Palestine (1930)
- Ian Simpson Architects, English architecture practice
- Jenny Simpson (album), eponymous country music album
- Robert Simpson Island, in Kiribati, now known as Abemama
- Samuel Simpson House, historic house in Wallingford, Connecticut
