= Thomas Simpson (disambiguation) =

Thomas Simpson (1710–1761) was a British mathematician and inventor.

Thomas, Tom, or Tommy Simpson may also refer to:

== Sports ==
- Tom Simpson (footballer) (1879–1950), English footballer for Port Vale and Bury
- Thomas Simpson (cricketer) (1879–1961), English cricketer
- Tom Simpson (golfer) (1877–1964), English professional golfer
- Tommy Simpson (rugby union) (1881-1956), English international rugby union player
- Tommy Simpson (footballer, born 1904) (1904–after 1928), Scottish football outside right active in the 1920s
- Duke Simpson (1927–2021), real name Thomas Leo Simpson, American baseball pitcher and member of 1953 Chicago Cubs
- Tommy Simpson (footballer, born 1931) (1931–2015), Scottish football defender active in the 1950s
- Thomas Simpson (footballer) (1933–2016), Australian footballer
- Tom Simpson (1937–1967), English road racing cyclist of the 1960s
- Tom Simpson (ice hockey) (born 1952), Canadian ice hockey player
- Tom Simpson (cricketer) (born 1974), English cricketer

== Arts and entertainment ==
- Thomas Simpson (composer) (1582–c. 1628), English composer
- Thomas Simpson (actor), English stage actor of the late seventeenth and early eighteenth century
- Tom Simpson, producer and editor of My Family Online
- Tom Simpson (musician) (born 1972), Scottish musician, keyboard player for the band Snow Patrol

== Other ==
- Thomas Simpson (architect, born 1816) (1816–1880), architect of Nottingham
- Thomas Simpson (architect, born 1825) (1825–1908), architect to the Brighton School Board
- Thomas Simpson (engineer) (1755–1823), British civil engineer
- Thomas Simpson (explorer) (1808–1840), explorer with the Hudson's Bay Company
- Thomas Blantyre Simpson (1892–1954), Scottish lawyer
- Thomas C. Simpson, American businessman, jurist, and politician from Massachusetts
- Thomas Edward Simpson (1873–1951), Canadian politician
- Thomas Joseph Simpson (1921–2017), Canadian recipient of the Distinguished Service Medal
- Thomas W. Simpson (born 1975), scholar, teacher, and writer in the fields of religion, human rights, and social justice

== See also ==
- Thomas Simpson Cooke (1782–1848), Irish composer
