= Edward Simpson =

Edward Simpson may refer to:

- Edward Simpson (naval officer) (1824–1888), officer in the U.S. Navy during the American Civil War and the Spanish–American War
- Edward A. Simpson (1892–?), World War I flying ace
- Edward B. Simpson (1835–1915), Wisconsin politician
- Edward Simpson (governor), Naval commandant and 20th Naval Governor of Guam
- Edward Sydney Simpson (1875–1939), Australian mineralogist and geochemist
- Edward H. Simpson (1922–2019), British statistician
- Edward Simpson (cricketer) (1867–1944), English cricketer
- Sir Edward Simpson (MP), British MP for Dover, 1759–1765
- Edward Simpson (forger) (1815–?), British geologist and forger
- Edward Simpson (Master of Trinity Hall, Cambridge) (died 1764), politician, lawyer and academic
