= Alan Simpson =

Alan Simpson may refer to:

- Alan Simpson (cricketer) (1890–1972), English cricketer and Indian Army officer
- Alan Simpson (theatre director) (1920–1980), Irish theatre director
- Alan Simpson (scriptwriter) (1929–2017), British screenwriter, of Galton and Simpson
- Alan Simpson (American politician) (1931–2025), United States senator from Wyoming
- Alan Simpson (runner) (1940–2024), British runner
- Alan Simpson (British politician) (born 1948), British Labour Party politician
- Alan Simpson (technical author) (born 1953), author of technology books
- Alan Simpson (actor) (born 1983), American actor

== See also ==
- Allan Simpson (born 1977), American baseball player
- Allan Simpson (born 1948), Canadian baseball writer and founder of Baseball America
- Simpson (name)
