= Billy Oswald =

Scottish footballer

Personal information
- Full name: William Oswald
- Date of birth: 3 August 1900
- Place of birth: Dundee, Scotland
- Date of death: 24 May 1969 (aged 68)
- Place of death: Providence, Rhode Island, United States
- Height: 5 ft 8 in (1.73 m)
- Position: Forward

Senior career*
Years	Team	Apps	(Gls)
19??–1922	Dundee Celtic		
1922	Dundee Hibs (trialist)	1	(2)
1922–1923	Gillingham	13	(3)
1923–1924	St Johnstone		
1924–1926	Dundee United	49	(15)
1926–1928	Brighton & Hove Albion	14	(2)
1928–1930	Providence	78	(22)
1931	Fall River	11	(1)
1931	New York Yankees	1	(0)
- * Club domestic league appearances and goals

William Oswald (3 August 1900 – 24 May 1969) was a Scottish footballer who played professionally in Scotland, England and the United States. He played as a forward.

== Life and career ==
Oswald was born in Dundee, Scotland, in 1900. He played football for Dundee Celtic, and had trials with English club Gillingham and with Dundee Hibs, during which he scored twice in a 4–1 win against Armadale at the end of the 1921–22 Scottish Division Two season. He chose to turn professional with Gillingham, and contributed 3 goals from 13 appearances in the 1922–23 Third Division South before returning to Scotland.

He spent the 1923–24 season with St Johnstone, mainly in the reserves, and then joined Dundee United in August 1924, initially on a month's trial. He top-scored with 12 goals, 10 in the league, as Dundee United won the 1924–25 Division Two title, but was less prolific in the First Division, and returned to England at the end of the season with another Third Division South club, Brighton & Hove Albion. He stayed with Albion for two seasons, but was unable to displace either Jack Nightingale or his former Dundee United teammate Tommy Simpson from the starting eleven, and scored twice from just 14 appearances.

In 1928, Oswald joined Providence of the American Soccer League. He briefly played for Fall River and the New York Yankees in 1931. He remained in the United States, settling in Providence, Rhode Island, where he became a naturalized citizen in 1944 and died in May 1969.
