= Jane Simpson =

Jane Simpson may refer to:

- Jane Simpson (artist) (born 1965), English artist
- Jane Simpson (footballer) (born 1971), New Zealand international women's football (soccer) player
- Jane Simpson (linguist), Australian linguist
- Jane Simpson (solicitor), English lawyer
- Jane Cross Simpson (1811–1886), Scottish hymnist and poet
- Jane Simpson (engineer), British engineer
- Jane Simpson McKimmon (1867–1957), author, agricultural educator, civic leader and a director of women's institutes
