= Andre Simpson =

Andre Simpson may refer to:

- Andre Simpson, character in Supacell
- Andre Simpson (baseball) in Golden Baseball League
- André J. Simpson (born 1974), research chemist and husband of fellow research chemist Myrna Simpson

== See also ==
- Andrew Simpson (disambiguation)
