= Charles Simpson =

Charles Simpson may refer to:

- Charles Simpson (politician) (1887–1963), Australian politician
- Charles Simpson (cricketer) (1882-1956), Australian cricketer
- Charles Ralph Simpson III (born 1945), United States federal judge
- Charles R. Simpson (Tax Court judge) (1921–2015), United States Tax Court judge
- Charles Torrey Simpson (1846–1932), American biologist
- Charles Walter Simpson (Canadian artist) (1878–1942)
- Charles Walter Simpson (English artist) (1885–1971)
- Charlie Simpson (born 1985), English popstar
- Charlie Simpson (footballer) (1861–?), English soccer player
- Charlie Simpson (fundraiser) (born c. 2003), seven-year-old British boy who raised over £150,000 ($241,000) for the 2010 Haiti earthquake relief efforts

== See also ==
- Charles S. Simpson House, Davenport, Iowa
