= John Nightingale =

John Nightingale may refer to:

- John Nightingale (academic) (born 1960), British academic
- John Nightingale (actor) (1942–1980), British actor
- John Nightingale (figure skater) (born 1928), American figure skater
- John Nightingale (police officer) (1913–2002), British police officer
- Jack Nightingale (1899–1967), full name John Gladstone Nightingale, English footballer
