= Our Song (film) =

- Directed by: Jim McKay
- Written by: Jim McKay
- Produced by: Jim McKay; Paul Mezey; Diana E. Williams
- Starring: Kerry Washington; Melissa Martinez; Anna Simpson
- Cinematography: Jim Denault
- Edited by: Alex Hall
- Production company: C-Hundred Film Corporation
- Distributed by: IFC Films
- Release dates: January 21, 2000 (Sundance); May 23, 2001 (United States)
- Running time: 95 minutes
- Country: United States
- Language: English
- Budget: $100,000 (estimated)
- Box office: $254,199 (US)

Our Song is a 2000 American coming of age drama film written and directed by Jim McKay. It follows three high school-aged girls and best friends over one pivotal summer in Brooklyn. Our Song stars Kerry Washington, Melissa Martinez, and Anna Simpson in their film debuts, respectively.

The film features the Jackie Robinson Steppers, a real-life community marching band. Our Song received critical acclaim for its realism and depiction of female adolescence.

== Plot ==
During one summer in Crown Heights, Brooklyn, three high school girls and best friends navigate changing realities and new feelings. Lanisha, Maria, and Joycelyn each have different family situations, romantic interests, moral codes and aspirations, but are close confidantes. The girls live in the same housing project and are all dedicated members of the Jackie Robinson Steppers, a community marching band that holds daily rehearsals in a local parking lot. The girls want to master the instruments they play in order to impress their conductor.

Aspiring singer Joycelyn works in a makeup boutique, while both Maria and Lanisha work at a bakery. Sometimes they talk about what they'll do after high school, but most of their conversations are about the immediate issues that face them daily. Foremost among them is the closing of the girls' high school due to an asbestos contamination, and the resulting challenge of finding a new school with a good reputation and planning the daily commute. These decisions become the catalyst for the girls setting out on increasingly divergent paths.

Maria learns she is pregnant by her boyfriend and has to make a decision about whether to keep the baby. Lanisha has faced a teen pregnancy herself before but chose to have an abortion. Maria eventually drifts towards the idea of having her baby.

== Cast ==
- Kerry Washington as Lanisha Brown
- Melissa Martinez as Maria Hernandez
- Anna Simpson as Joycelyn Clifton
- Marlene Forte as Pilar Brown
- Ray Anthony Thomas as Carl Brown
- Rosalyn Coleman as Dawn Clifton
- Carmen Lopez as Rita Hernandez
- Tyrone Brown as Mr. Miller
- Lorraine Berry as Kim

== Production ==
Director Jim McKay said the idea for the film "started out as an idea for a film about friendship. It was about kids outside of the mainstream of American society." McKay said he was dissuaded from making another female-driven film like his previous effort Girls Town. McKay said, "There were people who told me: ‘Don’t make another movie about young women. It’s a bad business move. You need to do something different.’ I'm really glad I didn't listen to them. This is the story I had to tell. This is what I wanted to do.”

The Jackie Robinson Steppers were not in the original script, but McKay wrote them in after he saw them perform and realized "what being in a band meant to the kids in that neighborhood." The film's lead actresses had a month of rehearsals prior to the start of filming, in addition to two months of practicing with the marching band. Filming took place over twenty days in July 1999.

== Reception ==
Our Song has a 91% approval rating on Rotten Tomatoes based on 53 reviews; the average rating is 7.3/10. The website's critical consensus reads: "Graced with such a realistic feel that it resembles a documentary, Our Song is a sensitive portrayal of three teenage girls." On Metacritic, the film has a weighted average score of 77 out of 100, based on 25 critics, indicating "generally favorable reviews".

Roger Ebert said that the film is "original and perceptive" and it does not force its characters into a tightly plotted story. Dennis Harvey of Variety called it a "finely observed, modestly scaled look at the current realities of low-income female adolescence".

A.O. Scott of The New York Times also praised the film, writing it "is so unlike most Hollywood coming-of-age stories as to seem downright revolutionary." Scott added, "'Our Song' steers clear of the condescension and sentimentality that color most contemporary cinematic portrayals of female adolescence. Even more remarkable, it avoids the sensationalism and ideological point-scoring that dominate most discussions of race, urban poverty and teenage pregnancy."

TV Guide wrote, "this coming-of-age slice of life is sometimes a bit too languid, and the band sequences, while kickin', don't mesh seamlessly with either plot or theme...Yet the movie sticks with you as few do: It's rewardingly authentic and emotionally real."
