= Peter Simpson =

Peter Simpson may refer to:

- Peter Simpson (film producer) (1943–2007), often credited as Peter R. Simpson, a British-Canadian film producer and advertiser
- Peter Simpson (Scottish footballer) (1904–1974), Scottish football striker who played for Crystal Palace in the 1920s and 1930s
- Peter Simpson (footballer, born 1945) (1945–2026), English footballer who played for Arsenal in the 1960s and 1970s
- Peter Simpson (footballer, born 1940), English footballer who played for Burnley and Bury
- Peter Simpson (Native rights activist) (c. 1871–1947), Tsimshian activist for Alaska Native rights
- Peter Simpson (writer) (born 1942), and former member of the New Zealand Parliament
- Sir Peter Simpson (anaesthetist) (born 1946), former president of the Royal College of Anaesthetists
- Peter Simpson, vocalist who helped Joey Negro on the 2004 track "Fly Away"
- Pete Simpson (born 1930), Wyoming politician and educator
