= Frank Simpson =

Frank Simpson may refer to:

- Frank F. Simpson (1868–1948), American physician from Pennsylvania
- Frank W. Simpson (1872–1929), American college football coach
- Frank B. Simpson (1883–1966), American architect
- Frank Simpson (British Army officer) (1899–1986), British Army General
- Frank Simpson (cricketer) (1909–1992), British Army officer and cricketer
- Frank Simpson (politician) (born 1945), American politician in the Oklahoma Senate
- Nuke (Marvel Comics), real name: Frank Simpson, a supervillain from Marvel Comics
