= Mary Simpson =

Mary Simpson may refer to:

== People ==
- Mary Simpson (priest) (1925–2011), one of the first women to be ordained an Episcopal priest (1977)
- Mary Simpson (Northern Ireland politician), unionist politician in Northern Ireland in the 1970s and 1980s
- Mary Simpson (violinist), violinist known for performing in Yanni's orchestra
- Mary Elizabeth Simpson (1865–1948), New Zealand religious teacher, healer and writer
- Mary Ellen Simpson, musician in The Ace of Cups
- Mary Kell Simpson (1903–1970), South Australian physiotherapist later known as Dorothy Kell Finnis
- Mary Simpson (house servant) (c.1752–1758 – 1836), African-American woman who claimed to be a former slave of George Washington
- Mary Jean Simpson (1888–1977), American scholar and public servant
- Mollie Evans (1922–2016), British antique dealer, born Mary Simpson
- Mary Simpson Sperry (1833–1921), née Simpson, American suffragist in California
- Mary Theresa Simpson (1951/1952 – 1964), American girl from Elmira, New York, see killing of Mary Theresa Simpson

== Characters ==
- Mary Simpson, fictional character in the 1632 book series
- Mary Simpson, fictional character on the TV series The Andy Griffith Show
- Mary Simpson, fictional character in the film Two Mafiamen in the Far West
