= Michael Simpson =

Michael Simpson or Mike Simpson may refer to:

== Entertainment ==
- Michael Simpson (painter) (born 1940), English painter
- Michael Simpson (producer), American record producer and member of the electronic group Dust Brothers
- Mike Simpson (Caulfields), guitarist of the rock group The Caulfields
- Mickey Simpson (1913–1985), American actor
- M. J. Simpson, British movie journalist, author and screenwriter
- Michael A. Simpson, director of sequels to the cult horror film Sleepaway Camp

== Politics ==
- Mike Simpson (Michigan politician) (1962–2009), member of the Michigan House of Representatives
- Mike Simpson (born 1950), U.S. congressman from Idaho

== Sports ==
- Mike Simpson (American football) (born 1947), American football player
- Michael Simpson (footballer) (born 1974), British footballer
- Mike Simpson (racing driver) (born 1983), British racing driver

== See also ==
- Michael Simpson Culbertson (1819–1862), American clergyman and missionary
