= Frederick Simpson =

Frederick Simpson may refer to:

- Frederick Simpson (boxer) (1916–1975), British boxer who competed in the 1936 Summer Olympics
- Frederick Simpson (athlete) (1878–1945), Mississauga Ojibway Canadian athlete
- Frederick Simpson (historian) (1884–1974), historian and fellow of Trinity College, Cambridge
- Fred Simpson (politician) (1886–1939), British Labour Party politician, MP for Ashton-under-Lyne 1935–1939
- Freddy Simpson (1883–?), English footballer for Lincoln City
- Fred Simpson (fl. 1999), coach for Rangers A.F.C. in Christchurch, New Zealand
