= George William Card =

Australian petrographer

George William Card, F.G.S., A.R.S.M. (? – 2 June 1943) was an Australian petrographer.

Card was responsible for the collections of the Mining Museum in Sydney and was a friend of William Rowan Browne; he was awarded the Clarke Medal by the Royal Society of New South Wales in 1935.

Card published Handbook to the Mining and Geological Museum, Sydney in 1902.

Awards
Preceded by Edward Sydney Simpson	Clarke Medal; 1935	Succeeded by Douglas Mawson
