= Daniel Simpson =

Daniel Simpson may refer to:

- Danny Simpson (early footballer) (1896–1903), English footballer
- Daniel R. Simpson (1927–2015), American politician
- Daniel H. Simpson (1939–2022), American diplomat
- Daniel Léo Simpson (born 1959), American composer
- Danny Simpson (born 1987), English footballer
- Daniel L. Simpson, United States Air Force major general

== See also ==
- Daniela Simpson (born 1976), American businesswoman
