= Paul Simpson =

Paul Simpson may refer to:

- Paul Simpson (footballer) (born 1966), ex-football player turned manager
- Paul Simpson (musician), musician, vocalist, lyricist and writer from Liverpool, England
- Paul Hardrock Simpson (1904–1978), ultra distance runner
- Paul Simpson (rugby union) (born 1958), English rugby player
