= Anna Simpson =

American actress and singer (born 1983)

- Born: March 23, 1983 (age 41); Brooklyn, New York, U.S.
- Occupation: Actress
- Years active: 2000–present
- Children: Angel Theory

Anna Simpson (born March 23, 1983) is an American actress and singer born in Brooklyn, New York. She is best known for the film Our Song (2000), starring alongside Kerry Washington and Melissa Martinez. Simpson gave birth to her daughter, Angel Theory, at age 16; Theory would go on to appear as Kelly on The Walking Dead. Simpson is a survivor of domestic abuse and she uses her real life experiences to help others who had to go through similar hardships. Most recently, she obtained her associate degree in an automotive school.

== Filmography ==
Film and television
Year	Title	Role	Notes
2000	Our Song	Joycelyn Clifton	
2004	Everyday People	Birthday Waiter	
2006	Sherrybaby	Sabrina	
2007	Law & Order: Criminal Intent	Callie	Episode: "Flipped"
2007	Liberty Kid	Nicole	
2010	Betrayal		Short
2017	Hack Back	Sloane	
