= Matt Simpson =

Matt Simpson may refer to:

- Matt Simpson (poet) (1936–2009), British poet and literary critic
- Matt Simpson (racing driver) (born 1981), British racing driver
- Matt Simpson (goalball) (born 1990), American goalball player
- Matt Simpson (tennis), New Zealand tennis player
- Matt Simpson (New York politician), member of the New York State Assembly from the 114th district
- Matt Simpson (Alabama politician), member of the Alabama House of Representatives

== See also ==
- Matthew Simpson (1811-1884), American bishop of the Methodist Episcopal Church
- Matthew Simpson (footballer) (born 1967), Australian rules footballer
