= Steve Simpson =

Steve or Stephen Simpson may refer to:

- Steve Simpson (mathematician) (born 1945), American logician
- Steve Simpson (baseball) (1948–1989), Major League Baseball pitcher
- Steve Simpson (wrestler) (born 1963), former wrestler in South Africa and the United States
- Steve Simpson (rugby league) (born 1979), Australian rugby league player
- Stephen Simpson (born 1984), South African racing driver
- Stephen Simpson (writer) (1789–1854), American author
- Stephen Simpson (doctor) (1793–1869), Australian pioneer
- Stephen Simpson (professor) (born 1957), Australian academic at the University of Sydney

== See also ==
- Steven Lewis Simpson, independent film and documentary filmmaker
