= Joseph Simpson =

Joseph or Joe Simpson may refer to:

== Sports ==
- Joe Simpson (rugby union, born 1856) (1856–1911), English rugby union player
- Joe Simpson (footballer), association football fullback who played for Lincoln City in the 1890s
- Bullet Joe Simpson (1893–1973), Canadian ice hockey player
- Joseph Simpson (cricketer) (born 1958), Guyanese cricketer
- Joe Simpson (mountaineer) (born 1960), English mountaineer and author of many books including Touching the Void
- Joe Simpson (rugby union, born 1988), Australian-born English rugby union player

== Others ==
- Joseph W. Simpson (1870–1944) , American businessman and politician in Maine
- Joseph Simpson (artist) (1879–1939), British painter and etcher of portraits and sporting subjects
- Sir Joseph Simpson (police officer) (1909–1968), British police officer, commissioner of the Metropolitan Police, 1958–1968
- Joe Simpson (baseball) (born 1951), broadcaster for the Atlanta Braves since 1992 and former baseball player
- Joe Simpson, American music manager and reality television producer, and the father of Ashlee and Jessica Simpson
- Joe Simpson (artist) (born 1984), English artist best known for cinematic oil paintings
