= Keith Simpson =

Keith Simpson may refer to:

- Keith Simpson (pathologist) (1907–1985), British pathologist
- Keith Simpson (politician) (born 1949), British politician, former Conservative MP for Broadland
- Keith Simpson (American football) (born 1956), former NFL safety
- Keith Simpson (footballer) (1907–1964), Australian rules footballer who played with South Melbourne
