= Simson (name) =

Simson is a surname, also a given name, and may refer to:

== Notable surnames ==
- Anna Simson (1835–1916), German women's rights activist
- Eduard von Simson (1810–1899), German jurist and politician
- Ernst von Simson (1876–1941), German lawyer, diplomat and entrepreneur
- Otto von Simson (1912–1993), German art historian
- Bernhard von Simson (1840–1915), German historian
- Geoffrey Spicer-Simson (1876–1947), British Commander
- Harold Fraser-Simson (1872–1944), British composer
- Ivan Simson (1890–1971), British Brigadier
- James Simson (1740–1770), medical academic at the University of St Andrews
- Kadri Simson (born 1977), Estonian politician
- Lovisa Simson (1746–1808), Swedish theater director
- Marianne Simson (1920–1992), German dancer
- Mecia Simson (born 1989), English actress
- Michelle Simson, Canadian politician
- Robert Simson (1687–1768), mathematician and geometer
- Ronald Simson, Scotland rugby player
- Sampson Simson (1780–1857), American philanthropist, "the father of Mount Sinai Hospital"
- Sergei Hohlov-Simson (born 1972), football player from Estonia
- Thomas Simson (1696–1764), medical academic at the University of St Andrews
- William Simson (1800–1847), Scottish painter

== Notable given names ==
First

- Simson Garfinkel, author, computer scientist, and Internaut

Middle

- Jacob Anatoli (c. 1194 – 1256), Abba Mari ben Simson ben Anatoli, translator of Arabic texts to Hebrew
- John Simson Woolson (1840–1899), United States federal judge
- Thomas Simson Pratt (1797–1879), British General

== See also ==
- Simpson (name)
- Simonsen
