= Brian Simpson =

Brian Simpson may refer to:

- Brian Simpson (musician) (born 1961), American contemporary jazz pianist and composer
- Brian Simpson (politician) (born 1953), British Labour Party politician and member of the European Parliament
- Brian Simpson (comedian), American stand-up comedian and podcaster
- A. W. B. Simpson (1931–2011), British legal historian and academic
