= Scott Simpson =

Scott Simpson may refer to:

- Scott Simpson (pole vaulter) (born 1979), Welsh pole-vaulter
- Scott Simpson (golfer) (born 1955), American golfer
- Scott Simpson (politician) (born 1959), New Zealand National Party MP
- Scott Simpson (Australian rules footballer)
- Scott Simpson (filmmaker), Canadian film and television director
- Scott Simpson, American actor who voiced in Blue Submarine No. 6
