= Charles S. Simpson House =

Historic house in Iowa, United States

- U.S. National Register of Historic Places
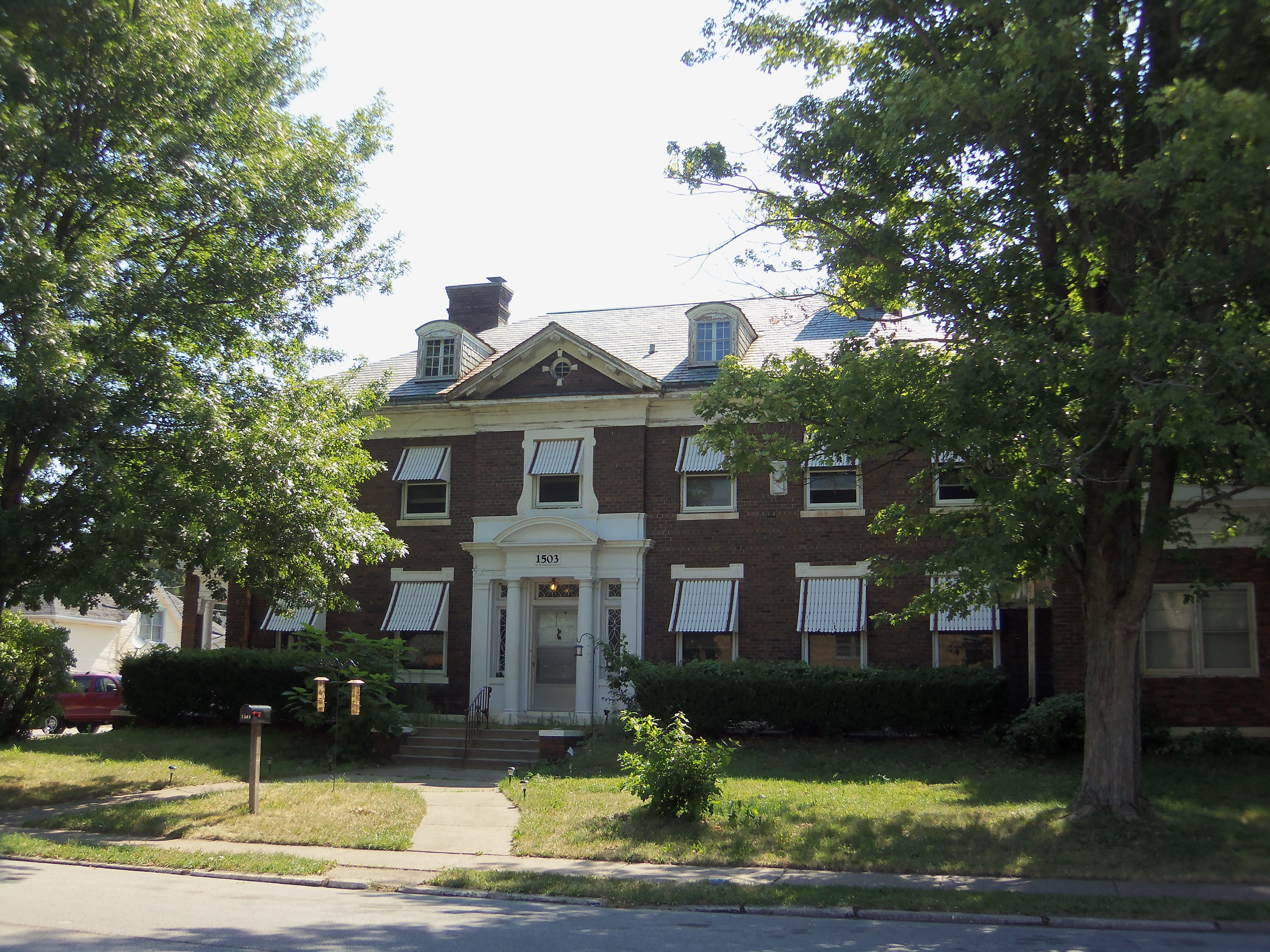

- Location within Iowa Location within the United States
- Location: 1503 Farnam St. Davenport, Iowa
- Coordinates: 41°32′07.4″N 90°33′59.3″W
- Area: 1.5 acres (0.61 ha)
- Built: 1910
- Architectural style: Colonial Revival
- MPS: Davenport MRA
- NRHP reference No.: 83002505
- Added to NRHP: July 7, 1983

The Charles S. Simpson House is a historic building located on the east side of Davenport, Iowa, United States. It has been listed on the National Register of Historic Places since 1983.

== Charles S. Simpson ==
Simpson was born in Miami County, Ohio in 1856, the son of David W. and Fannie (Martin) Simpson. He was educated in the local public schools of Troy, Ohio and when he finished his education he was involved in the nursery business and agriculture. He came to Scott County, Iowa in 1894. That same year he married Amelia Gross of Le Claire, Iowa. They had two children, one of whom died young. Charles was one of the organizers of the LeClaire Savings Bank in 1901 and was elected its president. For eleven of the fifteen years he lived in LeClaire he served as an alderman.

Simpson built this Georgian Revival home in Davenport in 1910. He maintained his position as the bank president in Le Claire after the move, but also served as treasurer of the Midland Supply Company, a vending machine and cigar lighter dealership.

== Architecture ==
The Simpson house is a fine Davenport example of the renewed interest that the United States had in Colonial Revival architecture around the turn of the 20th century. This particular house was designed in Georgian Revival idiom of the Colonial style. The two-story brick house features a high hipped roof with curved dormers, a six-bay front, a porte-cochere, and a full height entrance. The single-door entrance is framed by columns in the Doric order, a semicircular pediment, and sidelights.

A carriage house/garage is located along the alley northeast of the house. The two-story frame structure was built in the combined Queen Anne and Shingle styles. It has been adapted for use by automobiles. It features a steeply pitched roof that sweeps down to flared eaves, and it has a cupola on top. Other architectural features of the carriage house were removed when it was renovated.
