= Colin Simpson =

Colin Simpson may refer to:

- Colin Hall Simpson (1894–1964), Australian general
- Colin M. Simpson (born 1959), Wyoming politician
- Colin Simpson (EastEnders), a minor character in BBC's EastEnders
- Colin Simpson (English journalist) (1931–2017), war correspondent and investigative journalist for The Sunday Times
- Colin Simpson (Canadian author), software developer and author of textbooks
- Colin Simpson (Australian journalist) (1908–1983), Australian journalist, author and traveller
- Colin Simpson (rugby union)
