= Frank F. Simpson =

American physician (1868–1948)

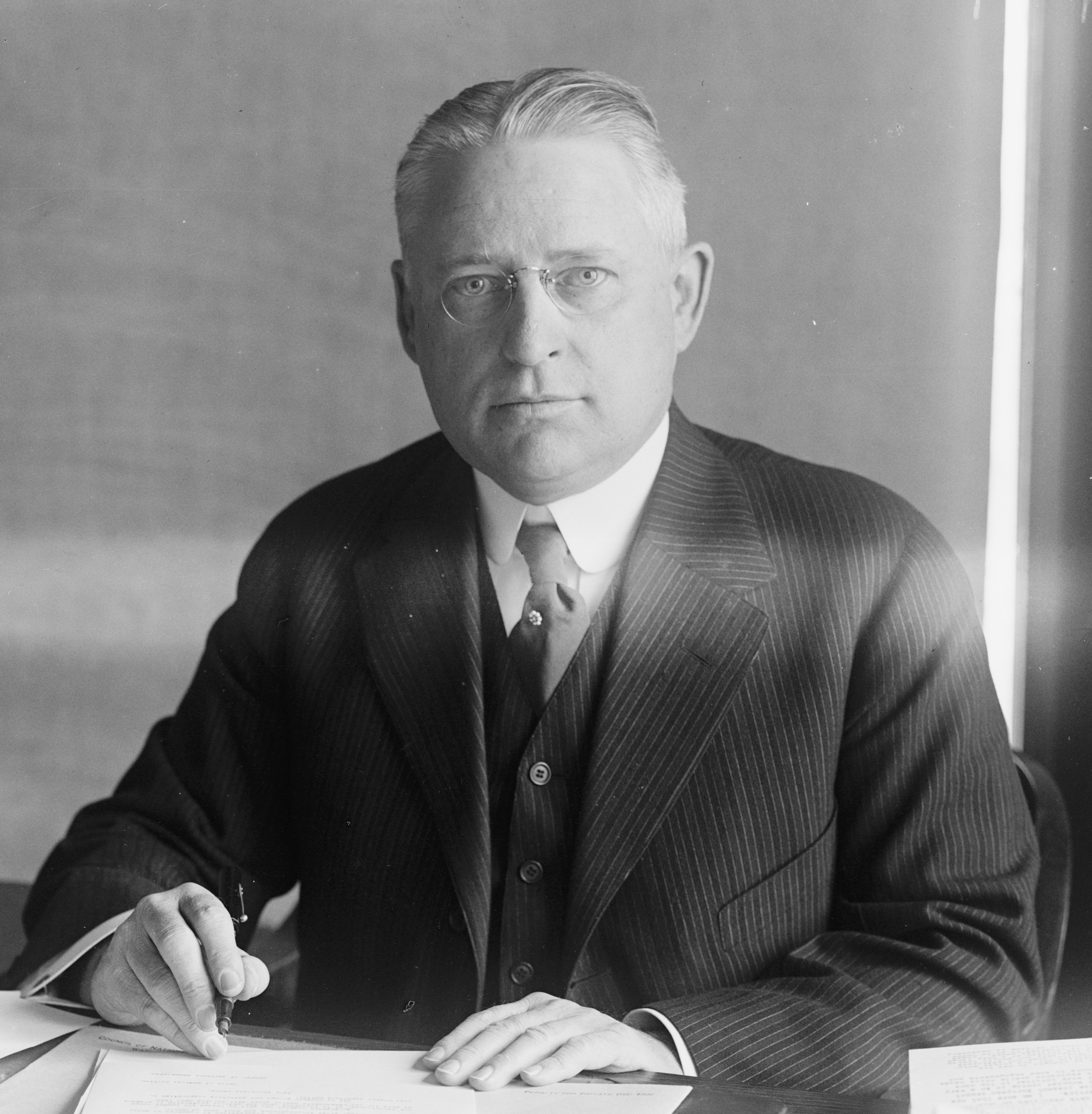
- Simpson in 1917
- Born: Frank Farrow Simpson; April 1868; Laurens, South Carolina, U.S.
- Died: February 10, 1948 (aged 79); Honolulu, Hawaii, U.S.
- Education: University of South Carolina (BA); University of Pennsylvania (MD)
- Occupation: Physician
- Spouse: Ruth P. Ring (m. 1924)

Signature
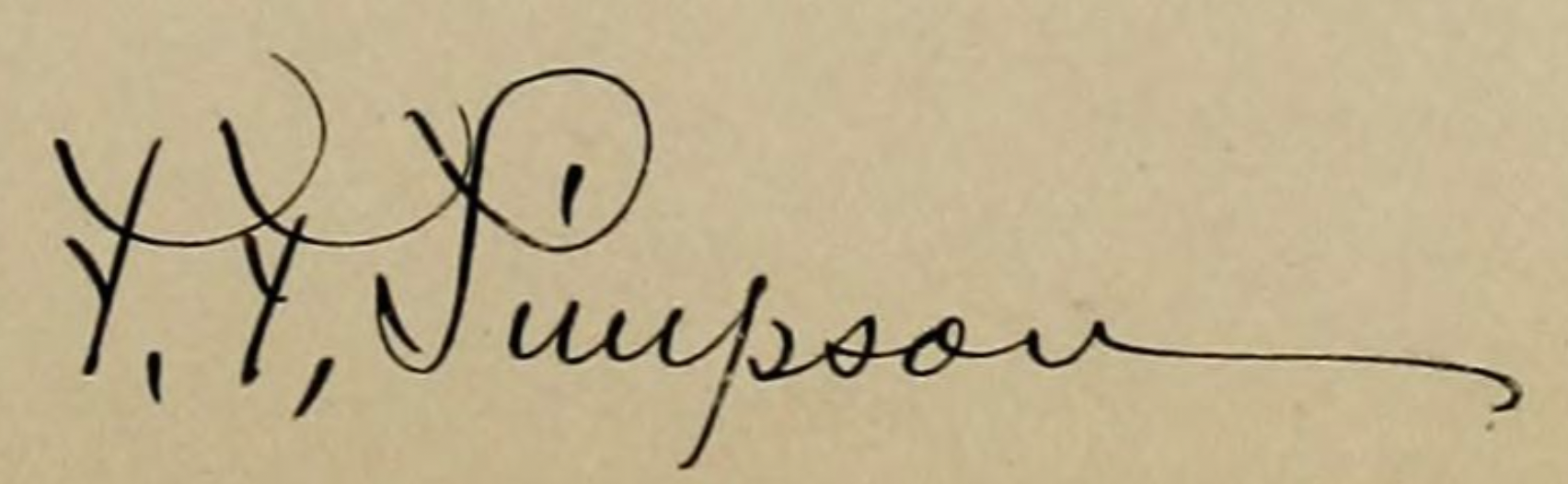

Frank Farrow Simpson (April 1868 – February 10, 1948) was an American physician from Pittsburgh, Pennsylvania. He was chief of the medical section of the Council of National Defense.

== Early life ==
Frank Farrow Simpson was born on April 2 (or 21), 1868, in Laurens, South Carolina, to Anna Patillo (née Farrow) and John Wistar Simpson. He attended private schools and graduated from the University of South Carolina in 1889 with a Bachelor of Arts. He graduated from the University of Pennsylvania School of Medicine with a M.D. in 1893. He was a member of Kappa Alpha.

== Career ==
In 1895, Simpson interned at Mercy Hospital in Pittsburgh for a year and became an assistant to Dr. X. O. Werder. He was then assistant gynecologist at Mercy for nine years. In 1903 or 1904, he became chief gynecologist at Allegheny General Hospital. For a time, he was a consulting gynecologist at Columbia Hospital. In 1912 and 1914, he traveled with Franklin H. Martin and the American Gynecological Club to Europe. In 1916, he became a member of the board of regents of the American College of Surgeons.

At the outbreak of World War I, Simpson was appointed secretary and helped organize the executive committee of American Physicians for Medical Preparedness under direction from President Woodrow Wilson. He served on the board with William James Mayo, Charles Horace Mayo, William C. Gorgas, Cary T. Grayson and Bernard Baruch. In December 1916, Simpson was made chief of the medical section of the Council of National Defense. In February 1917, Simpson became chairman of the medical standardization committee of the council. In 1919, he was elected secretary general of the International Association of Gynecologists and Obstetricians.

In 1915, Simpson was president of the American Gynecological Society. He was an organizer of the American Gynecological Club. He was a member of the Fourteenth International Congress of Physicians and Surgeons. He was secretary general and member of its executive committee of the Seventh International Congress for Obstetrics and Gynecology. He was treasurer of the executive committee of the American Physicians for the Aid of the Belgian Profession. He was a member of the executive committee of the American Society for the Control of Cancer.

== Personal life ==
Simpson married Ruth P. Ring of Philadelphia on March 12, 1924. He lived at Duquesne Club in Pittsburgh for more than 20 years. For the last 25 years or so, he lived in Honolulu. At the time of his death, he lived on Kahala Avenue in Honolulu. He was an Independent in politics. He was a member of the Presbyterian church.

Simpson died on February 10, 1948, at Queen's Hospital in Honolulu. He was cremated.
