= Alan Simpson (technical author) =

Software developer, technical writer and consultant

Alan Simpson (born 1953) is a software developer, technical writer and consultant. He has published over 100 titles, mostly focusing on database management and web technology. Many of his early titles are books about dBASE, such as Understanding dBASE III Plus (1986) and dBASE III Plus Programmer's Reference Guide (1988). His most recent title is Python All-in-One For Dummies (2021), co-authored with John C. Shovic.
