= Thomas W. Simpson =

American scholar and teacher

Thomas Wendell "Tom" Simpson (born 1975) is a scholar, teacher, and writer in the fields of religion, human rights, and social justice. He currently teaches seminars on human rights, the Holocaust, Islam, religion and global feminism, existentialist literature and philosophy, religion and popular culture, and U.S. religious history at Phillips Exeter Academy.

Simpson's first book, American Universities and the Birth of Modern Mormonism, 1867-1940, won the Mormon History Association's Best Book Award. A Congregationalist, Simpson studies religious diversity, conflict, and coexistence in the U.S. and abroad. J. Spencer Fluhman called Simpson's book "an elegant, original contribution and a must-read for anyone interested in American religion and the life of the mind."

Simpson's other published writings focus on the religious, political, and cultural landscapes of postwar Bosnia and Herzegovina. His nonfiction essays All We Have Left (2014) and Recovery's Rhythm and Blues (2016) have appeared in the Canadian literary magazine Numéro Cinq.

== Biography ==
Thomas Simpson was born in 1975 and raised in Olean, New York. He earned his bachelor's degree in religious studies and classics from the University of Virginia in 1997, his Master of Theological Studies degree from Emory University in 1999, and his Ph.D. in religious studies (specializing in European and American religious history) from the University of Virginia in 2005. He lives in Exeter, New Hampshire with his wife Alexis, who represents Rockingham County's 33rd district in the New Hampshire House of Representatives, and their two children.
