= Ruth Simpson =

Ruth Simpson may refer to:

- Ruth Simpson (activist) (1926–2008), author and founder of the United States' first lesbian community center
- Ruth Simpson (artist) (1889–1964), British artist
- Ruth DeEtte Simpson (1918–2000), American archeologist

== See also ==
- Ruth Williams-Simpson (born 1949), Jamaican sprinter
