= Keith Simpson (footballer) =

Australian rules footballer

Personal information
- Full name: Keith Leslie Simpson
- Born: 17 July 1907; Prahran, Victoria
- Died: 29 November 1964 (aged 57); Belgrave, Victoria
- Original team: Middle Park

Playing career^{1}
Years	Club	Games (Goals)
1931	South Melbourne	2 (0)
- ^{1} Playing statistics correct to the end of 1931.

Keith Leslie Simpson (17 July 1907 – 29 November 1964) was an Australian rules footballer who played with South Melbourne in the Victorian Football League (VFL).

Simpson later served in the Royal Australian Air Force during World War II.
