= James Simpson (academic) =

English language academic (born 1954)

James Simpson (born 16 March 1954 in Melbourne) is an Australian-British-American medievalist who served as the Donald P. and Katherine B. Loker Professor of English at Harvard University until his retirement in 2022.

== Education ==
- Educated at Scotch College (1966–1971)
- Arts Degree with Honours at Melbourne University, Melbourne (1976)
- Master of Philosophy, University of Oxford 1980
- Doctor of Philosophy (PhD), University of Cambridge (1996)

== Career ==
Simpson has worked in academia in Australia, the UK, and the US, where he has taught medieval literature. He was a University Lecturer in English at the University of Cambridge (1989-1999), Fellow and College Lecturer at Girton College, University of Cambridge (1989–1999) and Professor of Medieval and Renaissance English at the University of Cambridge (1999–2003). He then worked at Harvard University (2003-2022) where he was appointed "Donald P. and Katherine B. Loker Professor of English" (2004-2022).

== Awards ==
- Paget Toynbee Dante Alighieri Prize, Oxford University (1980)
- Jane Herbert Memorial Fellowship, Westfield College, University of London (1987)
- Life Fellow of Girton College, Cambridge University
- Honorary Fellow, Australian Academy of the Humanities (2003)
- John Hurt Fisher Prize – "Significant Contribution to the Field of John Gower Studies", John Gower Society (2003)
- British Academy Sir Israel Gollancz Prize – Reform and Cultural Revolution (2007)
- Silver Medal, Independent Publisher Book Awards – Religion category (2008) for "Burning to Read"

== Work ==
Simpson's work is centred on the shape and logic of literary works in their historical context. He believes that the purpose of literature and other art forms is "to hear the voices repressed by official forms of a given culture."

His early work focused on literary criticism and historical contextualization of poetry, especially the late 14th century English poem, Piers Plowman and Medieval Humanism from the 12th to the late 14th centuries (e.g. Alan of Lille's Anticlaudianus and John Gower's Confessio Amantis). In 2002, "The Oxford English Literary History: 1350–1547 : reform and cultural revolution" was awarded the British Academy Sir Israel Gollancz Prize.

Simpson began to study the way that cultural pressures, particularly the immense pressure of the Reformation in England, shaped the definition and reception of pre-Reformation literature. His work Burning to Read centres on the fundamentalist Bible reading in the early 16th century. Under the Hammer: Iconoclasm in the Anglo-American Tradition defines the long and unending history of image breaking in Anglo-American culture, leading up to, across, and beyond the Reformation. Permanent Revolution: the Reformation and the Illiberal Roots of Liberalism defines the English Reformation as a long period of revolution, with all the cultural features of revolutionary movements, and asserts that Liberalism was the answer to the violence-producing pressures produced.

== Works ==
Author

- Piers Plowman: An Introduction to the B-Text (Harlow, Essex: Longman, 1990)
- Sciences and the Self in Medieval Poetry: Alan of Lille’s "Anticlaudianus" and John Gower’s "Confessio amantis", Cambridge Studies in Medieval Literature, 25 (Cambridge: Cambridge University Press, 1995)
- Reform and Cultural Revolution, 1350-1547, Vol 2 of The Oxford English Literary History (Oxford University Press, 2002)
- Piers Plowman: An Introduction to the B-Text, second, revised edition (Exeter: Exeter University Press, 2007)
- Burning to Read: English Fundamentalism and its Reformation Opponents (Cambridge, MA: Harvard University Press, 2007)
- Under the Hammer: Iconoclasm in the Anglo-American Tradition (Oxford: Oxford University Press, 2010)
- Reynard the Fox: A New Translation (New York: Liveright/Norton, 2015)
- Permanent Revolution: The Reformation and the Illiberal Roots of Liberalism (Cambridge, MA: The Belknap Press of Harvard University Press, 2019)

Editor

- Medieval English Religious and Ethical Literature: Essays in Honour of G. H. Russell, edited by Gregory Kratzmann and James Simpson (Cambridge: D. S. Brewer, 1986, 250 pp. 133–153
- Images, Idolatry and Iconoclasm in Late Medieval England, edited by Jeremy Dimmick, James Simpson and Nicolette Zeeman (Oxford: Oxford University Press, 2002), xiv + 250 pp. 2005]
- John Lydgate: Poetry, Culture, and Lancastrian England, ed. Larry Scanlon and James Simpson (Notre Dame, IN: University of Notre Dame Press, 2006)]
- The Norton Anthology of English Literature, General Editors Stephen Greenblatt and M. H. Abrams; "The Middle Ages", ed. Alfred David and James Simpson (New York: W. W. Norton, 2006), 1-484
- John Hardyng, Chronicle: Edited from British Library MS Lansdowne 204, co-edited with Sarah Peverley (Kalamazoo, MI: Medieval Institute Publications, 2015)
