= Brian Simpson (comedian) =

American comedian

Comedy career
- Medium: Stand-up, television, podcasting
- Genres: Observational comedy, self-deprecating humor, social commentary
- Subjects: Everyday life, current events
- Website: www.briansimpsoncomedy.com

Brian Simpson is an American stand-up comedian and podcaster. As of 2025, he has over a decade of experience in stand-up comedy. He is known for his appearance on Lights out with David Spade, his Netflix appearance on The Standups and his Netflix special Live from the Mothership, as well as his podcast BS with Brian Simpson.

== Early life ==
Simpson grew up in foster care and he served in the United States Marine Corps.

== Career ==
Simpson began performing stand-up comedy after his military service. He started in San Diego, and later moved to Los Angeles where he became a regular at The Comedy Store. He later relocated to Austin, Texas, performing at the Comedy Mothership. In 2021, he was selected as a "New Face" at the Just For Laughs Comedy Festival in Montreal.

In 2023, Variety named him one of its 10 Comics to Watch.

He appeared on Season 3 of Netflix's The Standups, as well as That's My Time with David Letterman. Simpson's first hour-long special, Live from the Mothership, directed by Jeff Tomsic, premiered on Netflix on March 19, 2024. It was the first special ever filmed at The Comedy Mothership in Austin. He also hosts the podcast BS with Brian Simpson.
