= Christopher Simpson =

Christopher Simpson may refer to:

- Christopher Simpson (musician) (c. 1602/06–1669), English musician and composer
- Christopher Simpson (actor) (born 1975), Irish actor
- Christopher Simpson (cricketer) (1890–?), Guyanese cricketer
- Chris Patrick-Simpson (born 1979), Northern Irish actor
- Chris Simpson (cardiologist) (born 1967), Canadian cardiologist
- Chris Simpson (cricketer) (born 1982), Australian cricketer
- Chris Simpson (squash player) (born 1987), British squash player
- Chris Simpson, English musician with the band Magna Carta
- Chris Simpson, American singer in Mineral and The Gloria Record

== See also ==
- Christine Simpson (born 1964), Canadian television presenter
