= Alan Simpson (cricketer) =

English cricketer and soldier

Personal information
- Full name: Alan Richard Simpson
- Born: 21 June 1890; Shaftesbury, Dorset, England
- Died: 3 February 1972 (aged 81); Hastings, Sussex, England
- Batting: Unknown
- Bowling: Unknown

Domestic team information
- Years: Team
- 1922/23: Europeans

Career statistics
Competition	First-class
Matches	1
Runs scored	24
Batting average	24.00
100s/50s	–/–
Top score	20*
Balls bowled	273
Wickets	8
Bowling average	14.37
5 wickets in innings	1
10 wickets in match	–
Best bowling	6/73
Catches/stumpings	1/–
- Source: Cricinfo, 29 December 2023

Alan Richard Simpson (21 June 1890 – 3 February 1972) was an English first-class cricketer and an officer in the British Indian Army.

Simpson was born at Shaftesbury in June 1890. He served in the First World War with the British Indian Army Reserve of Officers, being commissioned as a second lieutenant in July 1915. A further promotion to lieutenant followed in July 1916. Following the war, he was promoted to captain in April 1920, prior to retiring from the Indian Army in April 1923. Shortly before his retirement, he made a single appearance in first-class cricket for the Europeans cricket team against the Parsees at Poona in the 1922–23 Bombay Quadrangular. Playing in the Europeans team as a bowler, he took figures of 6 for 73 in the Parsees first innings and 2 for 42 in their second innings; despite this, the Europeans lost the match by 118 runs. Simpson batted twice in the match, being dismissed in the Europeans first innings for 4 runs by P. H. Daruwala, while in their second innings he was unbeaten on 20.

By October 1929, Simpson had returned to service in the Indian Army as a captain; however, his return to service last for just under two years, with Simpson resigning his commission in June 1931. He later died at Hastings in February 1972.
