= Andrew Simpson =

Andrew Simpson may refer to:

- Andrew Simpson (actor) (born 1989), Irish actor
- Andrew Simpson (sailor) (1976–2013), British sailor
- Andrew Simpson (animal trainer) (born 1966/1967), Scottish animal trainer
- Andrew Clive Simpson (born c. 1970), British computer scientist
- Andrew Simpson (Neighbours), a fictional character from the soap opera Neighbours
