= Josh Simpson =

Josh Simpson may refer to:

- Josh Simpson (Australian footballer) (born 1994), Australian rules footballer
- Josh Simpson (soccer) (born 1983), Canadian soccer player
- Josh Simpson (English footballer) (born 1987), English footballer
- Josh Simpson (glass artist) (born 1949), American glass artist
- Josh Simpson (baseball) (born 1997), American baseball player
- Joshua McCarter Simpson (ca. 1820-1877), American poet and lyricist
