= Eric Simpson =

American basketball coach

Playing career
- 1990–1994: Northwestern

Coaching career (HC unless noted)
- 2007–2009: Loyola (IL) (Assistant)
- 2009–2013: Loyola (IL)

Head coaching record
- Overall: 27–34
- Tournaments: 0–0

Eric Simpson is an American women's basketball coach who most recently served as the head coach at Loyola University Chicago from 2009 until resigning at the end of the 2012–13 season. He previously served as a women's assistant coach and Director of Men's Basketball Operations at Loyola and was an assistant coach on the high school level at Loyola Academy from 1994 to 1996 and his alma mater, St. Ignatius, from 1999 to 2001. Simpson was also the athletic director and head boys basketball coach at Marquette Catholic High School in Michigan City, Indiana from 2001 to 2005.

== Player history and education ==
Simpson played NCAA Division I men's basketball on the college level for the Big Ten's Northwestern Wildcats. After graduating with a B.A. in history in 1994, Simpson began a ten-year stint coaching at the high school level before joining the Loyola staff as the Director of Basketball Operations for the men's team.

== Head coaching record ==
Record table
| Season | Team | Overall | Conference | Standing | Postseason |
|---|---|---|---|---|---|
Loyola Ramblers (Horizon League) (2009–2013)
| 2009–10 | Loyola | 15–15 | 9–9 | T–6th | |
| 2010–11 | Loyola | 12–19 | 5–13 | 8th | |
| 2011–12 | Loyola | 13–17 | 8–10 | 6th | |
| Loyola: | | 40-51 (.440) | 22–32 (.407) | | |
| Total: | | 40–51 (.440) | | | |
National champion Postseason invitational champion Conference regular season champion Conference regular season and conference tournament champion Division regular season champion Division regular season and conference tournament champion Conference tournament champion
