= Heather Simpson =

Heather Simpson may refer to:

- Heather Simpson (academic), New Zealand professor emerita of animal physiology
- Heather Simpson (civil servant), former chief of staff for New Zealand PM Helen Clark
- Heather Simpson (journalist), Scottish broadcast journalist and presenter
