= Alexander Simpson =

Alexander Simpson may refer to:

- Alexander Simpson (politician) (1872–1953), American journalist, attorney and politician
- Alexander Lockhart Simpson (1785–1861), Scottish minister
- Alexander Russell Simpson (1835–1916), Scottish physician
- Alexander Simpson (cricketer) (1905–1975), Scottish first-class cricketer and schoolmaster
- Alex Simpson (1924–2008), Scottish footballer
