= Daniela Simpson =

American businesswoman (born 1976)

- Education: University of Economics, Prague; UCLA Anderson School of Management (MBA)
- Occupation: Marketing
- Employer: Ferrara Candy Company
- Spouse: Aaron Simpson

Daniela Simpson (born May 11, 1976) is a marketing executive and an American businesswoman of Czech descent. She is currently the General Manager at Ferrara Candy Company, and is a two-time winner of the Most Innovative New Product Award in the non-chocolate category at the National Confectioners Association Sweets & Snacks Expo.

== Biography ==
Simpson's undergraduate degree is in marketing from University of Economics, Prague and she received her MBA from UCLA Anderson School of Management. At Nestlé, where Simpson served as Marketing Director, she oversaw a $500 million portfolio of brands. Simpson led the creation of the US$100 million Skinny Cow chocolate business, which was included on Nielsen's list of 14 Breakthrough Innovations of the Year in 2013.

Simpson has earned two Most Innovative New Product Awards at the yearly National Confectioners Association Sweets & Snacks Expo. In 2016 she and her team received the award for Nerds Lucha Grande and in 2018 she won for Big Chewy Nerds. As of 2018, Daniela Simpson is the general manager at the Ferrera Candy Company, overseeing their US$1.1 billion candy and fruit snacks business unit. She joined Ferrera after playing a role in the sale of the Nestlé Confections & Snacks business, which sold to Ferrera for US$2.8 billion in January, 2018.

Daniela Simpson is married to Aaron Simpson, an animation producer.
