= Joe Simpson (footballer) =

English footballer

Personal information
- Position: Full back

Senior career*
Years	Team	Apps	(Gls)
1894–1895	Lincoln City	21	(0)
- Newark
- Kettering
1896–1898	Lincoln City	41	(0)
- St Mary's (Lincoln)
1899–1901	Lincoln City	8	(0)
- * Club domestic league appearances and goals

Joseph W. Simpson (fl. 1890s) was an English footballer who made 70 appearances in the Football League playing for Lincoln City in three separate spells. He played as a full back. He also played for Midland League clubs Newark and Kettering, and for Lincoln-based club St Mary's.

Simpson had an eventful debut for Lincoln City. After 20 minutes of the visit to Darwen, goalkeeper John Broadbent suffered a broken bone in his shoulder, and Simpson replaced him in goal. He and Lincoln conceded a further five goals, to make the final score 6–0.
