= Jimmy Simpson (footballer, born 1923) =

English footballer

Personal information
- Full name: James Simpson
- Date of birth: 8 December 1923
- Place of birth: Clay Cross, England
- Date of death: 1 May 2010 (aged 86)
- Place of death: Matlock, England
- Position: Inside forward

Senior career*
Years	Team	Apps	(Gls)
–1945	Parkhouse Colliery		
1945–1948	Chesterfield	3	(0)
1948	Buxton		
Total		3	(0)
- * Club domestic league appearances and goals

James Simpson (8 December 1923 – 1 May 2010) was an English professional footballer who played as an inside forward in the Football League for Chesterfield and in non-League football for Buxton, and as a wartime guest for Stoke City.

== Career ==
Born in Clay Cross, Derbyshire, Simpson started his career with Parkhouse Colliery where he also worked as a miner. In 1946 he signed professional terms for Football League Second Division side Chesterfield where he went on to make three league appearances during the 1946–47 season, including a 2–0 win over Manchester United. In January 1948, he signed for Cheshire County League side Buxton, also returning to face work at Parkhouse Colliery. In 1948, he suffered a fall in the mine and was crushed causing a severe back injury which curtailed his football career.

== Personal life ==
After retiring from full-time football, he worked for North East Derbyshire District Council as a driver until retirement. He died on 1 May 2010 in Matlock, Derbyshire at the age of 86.
