= Humanitarian response to the 2010 Haiti earthquake =

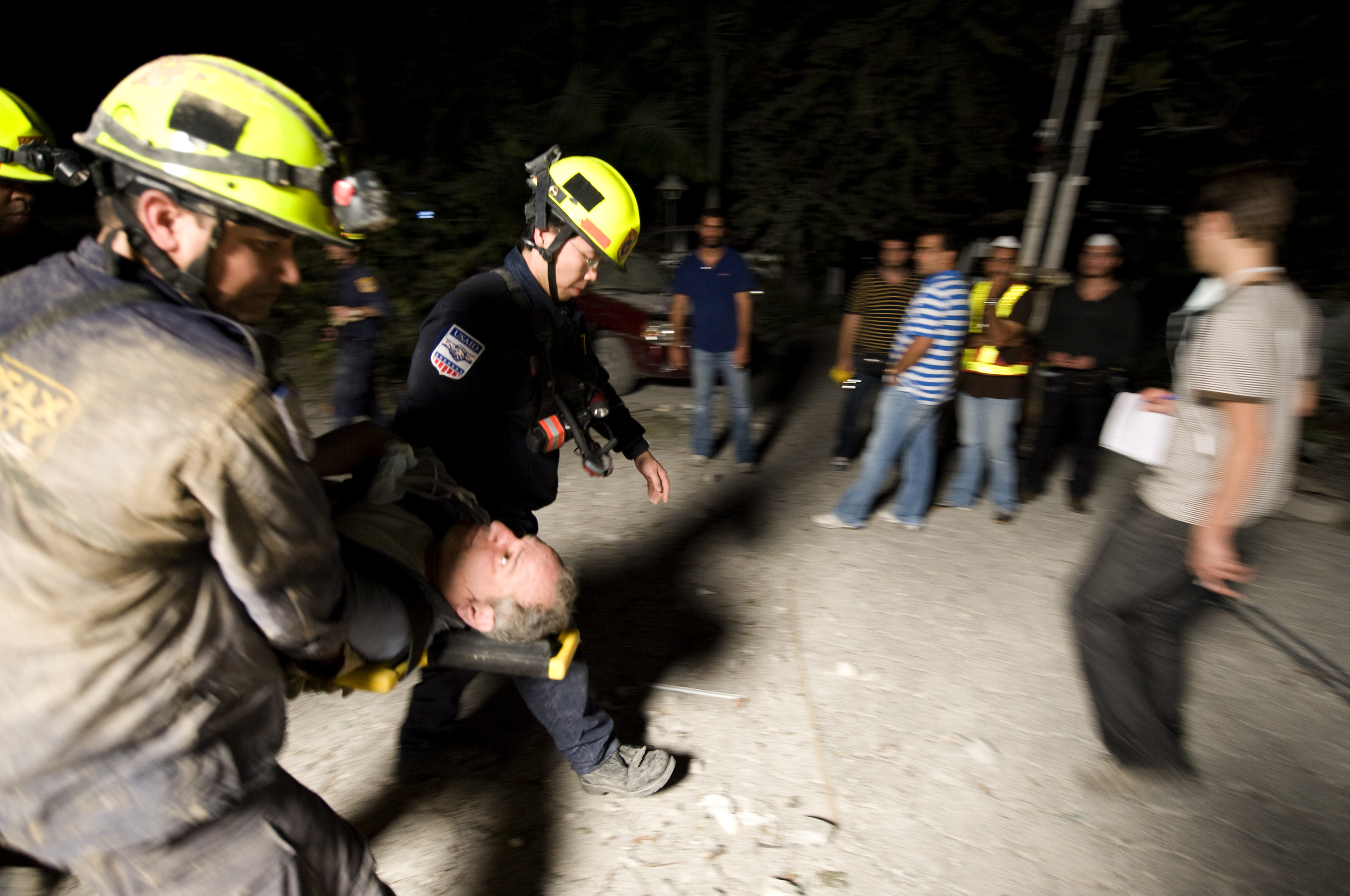
American and French rescue workers carry a survivor, who was trapped under the rubble from the debris of the Hôtel Montana in Port-au-Prince, Haiti, on January 15, 2010.

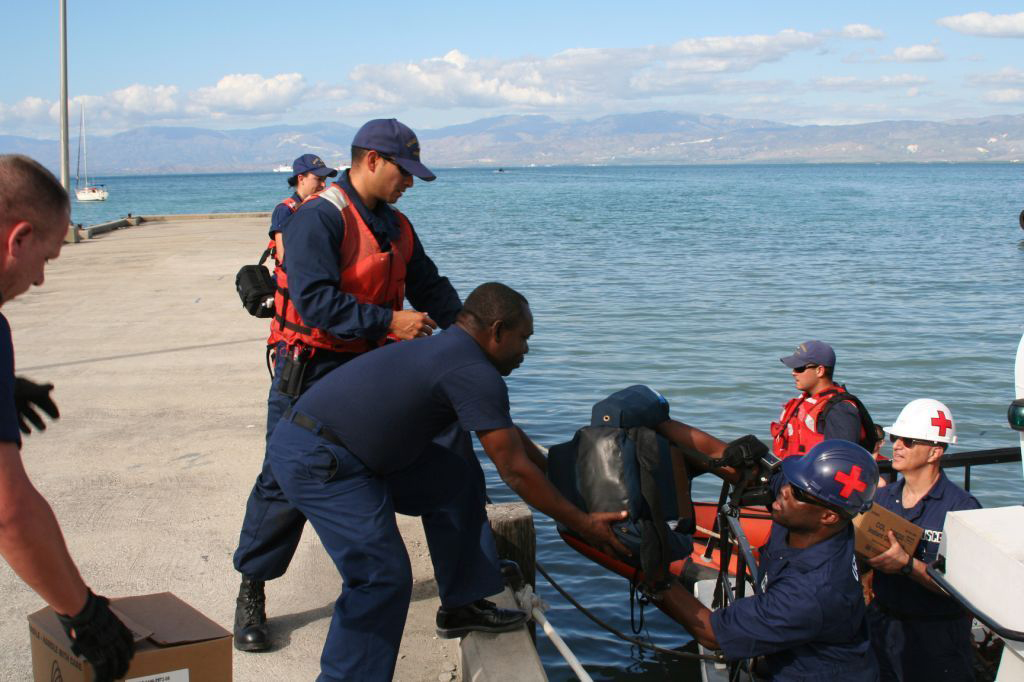
Rescue workers supplies delivered to Haiti from the U.S. Navy ships, on January 16, 2010.

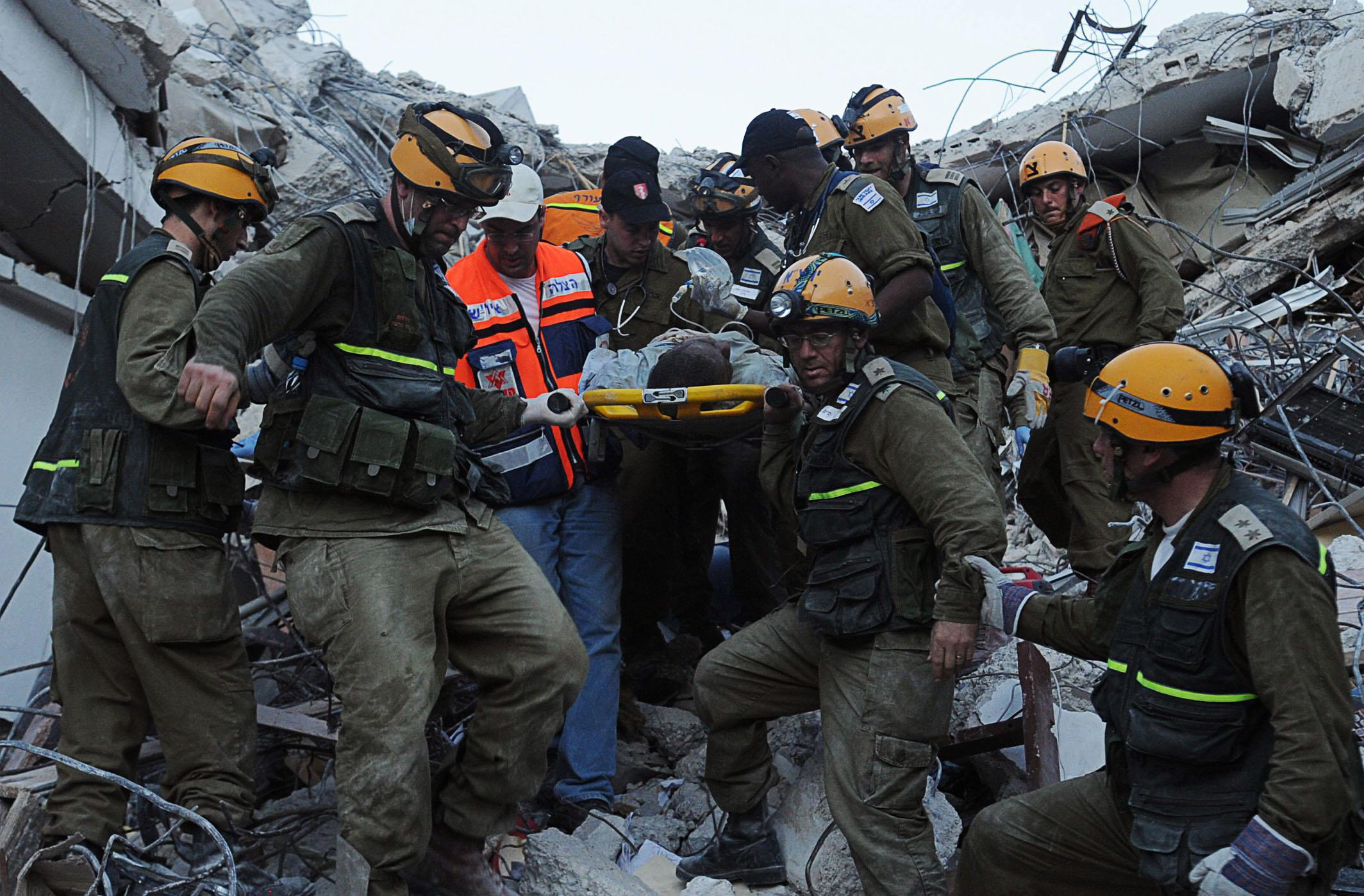
The Israel Defense Forces team extracts a person, who was trapped under the rubble from the government building in Port-au-Prince, Haiti, on January 17, 2010.

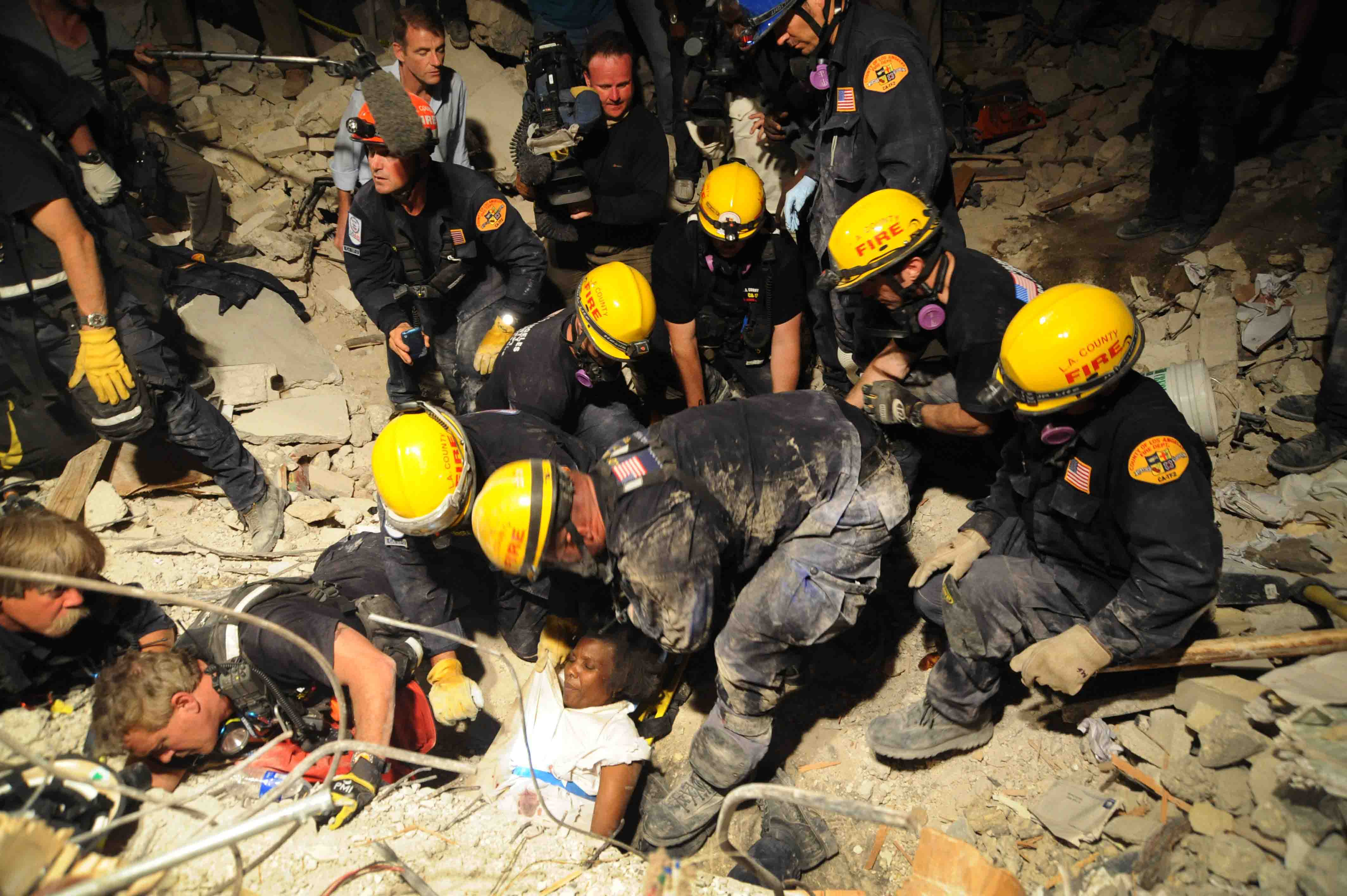
The Los Angeles County Fire Department urban search and rescue workers pulls Haitian woman from the earthquake debris in Port-au-Prince, Haiti, on January 17, 2010.

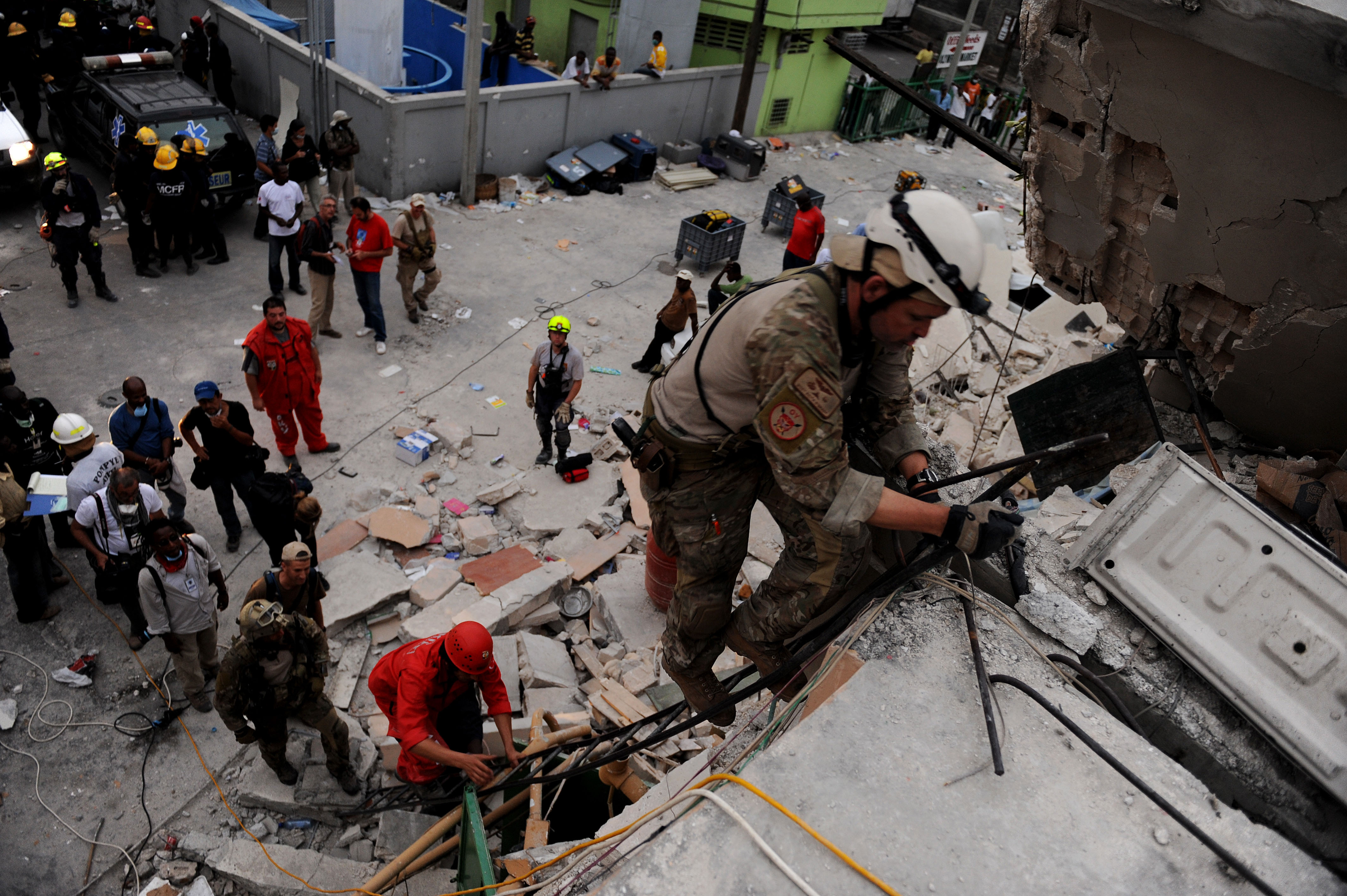
U.S. Air Force pararescueman climb a ladder to save a survivor at the collapsed building in Port-au-Prince, Haiti, on January 19, 2010.

The response to the 2010 Haiti earthquake included national governments, charitable and for-profit organizations from around the world which began coordinating humanitarian aid designed to help the Haitian people. Some countries arranged to send relief and rescue workers and humanitarian supplies directly to the earthquake damage zones, while others sought to organize national fund raising to provide monetary support for the nonprofit groups working directly in Haiti. OCHA coordinates and tracks this on a daily basis. The information is disseminated through the UN news and information portal, ReliefWeb. As of September 5, 2013, ReliefWeb have reported a total relief funding of $3.5 billion given (and a further $1 billion pledged but not given).

The United States was by far the largest single contributor to the relief efforts. The international community also committed numerous major assets such as field hospitals, naval vessels, a hospital ship, aircraft carriers, transport aircraft and emergency facilities soon after the extent of the disaster became apparent. The Dominican Republic was the first country to mobilize resources to aid and rescue Haiti immediately after the earthquake.

Progress in responding to the earthquake was hampered by a number of factors, including loss of life, a number of aftershocks, destroyed infrastructures, collapsed buildings blocking streets, the lack of electricity for gasoline station pumps, loss of the capital's seaport, and loss of air traffic control facilities. The damage to the Haitian government ministries, all of which suffered varying degrees of destruction and personnel deaths, impeded coordination of the disaster response.

In April 2010, the Haitian government asked that food distribution in the Pétion-Ville camp cease in order to allow the normal economy to resume.

== Appeals for aid ==
Appeals for international aid were immediately requested by Raymond Joseph, Haiti's ambassador to the United States and his nephew, singer Wyclef Jean, The American Red Cross quickly announced that it had run out of supplies in Haiti and appealed for public donations.

== Response by intergovernmental organizations ==
In early January 2010 the EU released €3 m in emergency funding.

The European Council and its member nations later announced more than €429 million (US$600,000,000) in emergency humanitarian aid, rehabilitation aid and medium-to long-term reconstruction aid. The aid was to be provided as detailed:

Humanitarian Assistance

The EU pledged €122 million in humanitarian assistance: Emergency relief aid package: €30 million (incl. a €3 million ECHO fast-track decision). Commission funds were to be distributed via UN agencies, international NGOs and the Red Cross. €92 million from member countries.

Support for Early Recovery and Reinforcing State Capacity.

The European Commission pledged to provide €100 million for short term recovery and rehabilitation.

Reconstruction and Rehabilitation.

The European Commission pledged to provide €200 million from the 10th and 9th EDF funds for Haiti. They would be in addition to bilateral contributions from EU Member States' budgets.

The European Union thus pledged at least €429 million to Haiti in both emergency and humanitarian aid to help the medium and long-term work of rebuilding the country devastated by the earthquake. In addition, the 27 countries decided to send some 150 troops from the European Gendarmerie to ensure that humanitarian aid would reach the people affected by the earthquake.

The financial contribution of the EU as a whole totaled €429 million, broken down as:

- €92 million coming from contributions made by Member States,
- €30 million from the European Commission itself,
- €107 million from existing EU funds that were being redirected to Haiti, and another
- €200 million shuffled for the medium- and long-term rehabilitation.

=== Organization of American States ===
The Organization of American States donated US$100 000.

=== Union of South American Nations ===
The Union of South American Nations pledged US$300 000 000 to help rebuild Haiti in the long term. A meeting was held in Quito in order to discuss how it would be utilized.

=== United Nations ===
As the extent of the catastrophe unfolded, United Nations Secretary-General Ban Ki-moon commented: "There is no doubt that we are facing a major humanitarian emergency and that a major relief effort will be required". The U.N. mobilized an emergency response team to help coordinate humanitarian relief efforts.

- The Security Council authorised an increase of 3,500 troops and police of the United Nations Stabilization Mission in Haiti in Resolution 1908.
- The World Bank provided extra funding of $100 million to support recovery and reconstruction in Haiti.
- UNICEF made an emergency appeal for assistance to aid the victims.
- The World Health Organization sent a "12-member team of health and logistics experts."
- The World Food Programme provided over 200 staff members on the ground, with their rapid-response team supporting the entire humanitarian effort."
- The International Atomic Energy Agency sent eight mobile medical X-ray machines to Haiti.
- The Office for the Coordination of Humanitarian Affairs established a coordination office in Haiti to coordinate the international relief effort in support of the Government of Haiti.

== Response by non-governmental organizations ==
Many non-governmental organizations, including international, religious and regionally-based NGOs, immediately pledged support in the aftermath of the 2010 Haiti earthquake. NGOs contributed significantly to both on-the-ground rescue efforts and external solicitation of aid for those rescue efforts.

== Responses by notable persons and groups ==
- Jennifer Aniston announced a donation of US$500,000 to Doctors Without Borders, Partners in Health and Americares.
- Charles Aznavour and Youssou N'Dour recorded a music video called Un geste pour Haiti cherie for French television that appeals to viewers to donate to the earthquake relief.
- Sandra Bullock donated US$1,000,000
- Gisele Bündchen donated US$1,500,000
- Samuel Dalembert donated US$100,000 to UNICEF
- Leonardo DiCaprio donated US$1,000,000.
- Jean-Claude Duvalier announced that he would ask a foundation set up in the name of his mother to transfer an estimated £5,000,000 (US$8,000,000) of its assets to the American Red Cross.
- Elon Musk donated US$230,000.
- Queen Elizabeth II made a donation to the relief effort and issued a personal message of condolence to the President of Haiti.
- Evanescence released a previously unreleased track, "Together Again", originally intended for inclusion on but was later cut from their album The Open Door, as a charity single on January 22, 2010. The track was available as a free download to anyone who donated to the United Nations Foundation.
- Lady Gaga announced that proceeds from her New York concert would go to Haiti relief, which is later revealed to have raised more than US$500,000.
- Angelina Jolie and Brad Pitt donated US$1,000,000
- Madonna donated US$250,000
- Alyssa Milano donated US$50,000 to UNICEF, and challenged any corporation to match her donation.
- Denis O'Brien pledged €3.5 million.
- Carlos Peña donated US$15,000
- T-ara of South Korea donated $10,000 of their own income for the disaster.
- James Taylor performed a January 22 benefit concert for Haiti at the Mahaiwe Performing Arts Center in Great Barrington, Massachusetts.
- Miguel Tejada personally delivered humanitarian supplies.
- John Travolta piloted his private jet to Haiti on January 26, 2010, bringing six tons of ready-to-eat military food and medical supplies plus several doctors and ministers.
- Olivia Wilde promised to send a personalized thank-you video to anyone who donates $200 or more to Artists for Peace and Justice.
- Oritsé Williams of JLS donated an undisclosed sum to the Disasters Emergency Committee relief effort and left a blog post on the band's website urging fans to donate as well. In the post, Williams revealed that he had family that were killed by the earthquake.
- Tiger Woods donated US$3,000,000
- Charlie Simpson, a seven-year-old British boy from Fulham, south London, who initially aimed to raise £500 ($800) by cycling round his local park in London, raised more than £200,000 (US$300,000) for UNICEF via Internet donations from around the world on his JustGiving page. Simpson's fundraising effort gained national and then international coverage, and by the end of the day of his sponsored bicycle ride his JustGiving webpage had amassed donations of over £60,000 ($96,700) from donors all over the world. Two days later (as of 26 January 2010) the total stood at over £150,000 ($240,000). By 27 March 2010 the total stood at £210,000 ($312,963).

== Response by online communities ==
- Avaaz: users raised over US$800,000 as of January 16.
- GSN: members of Game Show Network could donate their earned oodles in denomination of $10, $25, and $50. As of 1/26/10 over $25,000 has been raised.
- Reddit: users raised over US$178,000 as of February 15.
- Belfast4Haiti: members of the underground music scene in Belfast, Northern Ireland set up a citywide fundraising campaign and as of 2nd Feb 2010 over £37,000 had been raised.
- Roblox: around 16,000 users raised over US$5479.00 which were sent to the American Red Cross.
- GaiaOnline: matched donations made by its members up to US$10,000 to the American Red Cross.
- myYearbook: allowed members to donate lunch money to the American Red Cross via its Causes application.

== Long-term effect of humanitarian response ==
As of 2015, 5 years after the earthquake, over 500,000 victims were still living in temporary shelters without electricity, plumbing or sewage. Lack of proper sanitation is thought to be the foundation upon which the ongoing cholera outbreak is based.

Much of the US aid funding was hindered by US statutory restrictions limiting spending to US products, materials and employees, which had to be transported to Haiti. This not only raised the costs involved, compared to local, but also prevented the aid from stimulating the Haitian economy.

== See also ==
- Crisis camp
- Haiti cholera outbreak
- Humanitarian response to the 2004 Indian Ocean earthquake
- Humanitarian response to the 2015 Nepal earthquake
- International response to Hurricane Katrina
- International response to the 2005 Kashmir earthquake
