= Tommy Simpson (footballer, born 1904) =

Scottish footballer

Personal information
- Date of birth: 1904
- Place of birth: Dundee, Scotland
- Height: 5 ft 7 in (1.70 m)
- Position: Outside right

Senior career*
| Years | Team | Apps | (Gls) |
| 19??–1923 | Dundee Osborne | | |
| 1923–1927 | Dundee United | 99 | (13) |
| 1927–1928 | Brighton & Hove Albion | 30 | (6) |
| 1928–19?? | Montrose | | |
- * Club domestic league appearances and goals

Thomas M. Simpson (1904 – after 1928) was a Scottish professional footballer who played as an outside right in the Scottish League for Dundee United and in the English Football League for Brighton & Hove Albion.

== Life and career ==
Simpson was born in Dundee in 1904. He played junior football for Dundee club Osborne before signing for Dundee United in December 1923. He became a regular in the side, and made a major contribution to their promotion to the Scottish First Division in 1924–25. After more than 100 appearances in league and cup competition over three-and-a-half seasons, he left for English club Brighton & Hove Albion for a £250 fee. He played 30 times in the Third Division South before returning to Scotland where he joined Montrose.
