= Edward A. Simpson =

RAF officer

Edward Arthur Simpson
- Born: 24 May 1892; Islington, London, England
- Died: Unknown
- Military career
- Allegiance: England
- Branch: Aviation
- Rank: Second lieutenant
- Unit: No. 49 Squadron RAF
- Awards: Distinguished Flying Cross

Second Lieutenant Edward Arthur Simpson (born 24 May 1892, date of death unknown) was a World War I flying ace credited with six aerial victories.
