= Mary Elizabeth Simpson =

New Zealand religious teacher, healer, and writer

Mary Elizabeth Simpson (1865–1948) was a notable New Zealand religious teacher, healer and writer. She was born in Christchurch, North Canterbury, New Zealand in 1865.
