= Edward H. Simpson =

British statistician and civil servant (1922–2019)

Edward Simpson CB
- Simpson in 1942
- Born: 10 December 1922; Northern Ireland, UK
- Died: 5 February 2019 (aged 96); England, UK
- Education: Queen's University Belfast; Christ's College, Cambridge
- Known for: Cryptoanalysis using Banburismus; Simpson's paradox Simpson's index
- Scientific career
- Fields: Mathematics, statistics
- Workplaces: Bletchley Park; Civil Service
- Doctoral advisor: Maurice Bartlett

Edward Hugh Simpson CB (10 December 1922 – 5 February 2019) was a British codebreaker, statistician and civil servant. He was best known for having described Simpson's paradox along with Udny Yule.

== Contributions to the field of statistics ==
Edward Hugh Simpson was introduced to the thinking of mathematical statistics as a cryptanalyst at Bletchley Park (1942–45). He wrote the paper "The Interpretation of Interaction in Contingency Tables" while a postgraduate student at the University of Cambridge in 1946 with Maurice Bartlett as his tutor; and published it in the Journal of the Royal Statistical Society in 1951 at Bartlett's request because Bartlett wanted to refer to it. The paper considered what came to be known as the Yule-Simpson effect or Simpson's paradox. This paradox is used in mathematical statistics teaching to illustrate the care statisticians need to take when interpreting data. It figured in a 2009 episode of the US television crime-solving series Numb3rs, and also, appropriately, in an episode of The Simpsons.

At one point a useful observation of his on the aggregate behaviour of teachers' pay was labelled "Simpson's Drift".

== Education ==
Simpson grew up in Northern Ireland, and attended Coleraine Academical Institution, and he then studied at Queen's University Belfast (BSc, 1st cl. Hons Mathematics), from which he graduated at the age of 19 in 1942. After the war, he studied for a PhD degree in Mathematical Statistics at Christ's College, Cambridge, as a scholar, from 1945 to 1947.

== Career ==
In Autumn 1942, Simpson was recruited to work at Bletchley Park, initially as a codebreaker in the Italian Naval Section. As the war with Italy was ending in 1943, he was asked to lead the JN-25 team, contributing to the US Navy code-breaking efforts supporting the war in the Pacific. After the end of World War II, Simpson entered the civil service administrative class. He joined the UK Ministry of Education in 1947 and subsequently worked also in the Treasury, the Commonwealth Education Liaison Unit, as Private Secretary to Lord Hailsham as Lord President of the Council and Lord Privy Seal, and in the Civil Service Department.

He was a Commonwealth Fund (Harkness) Fellow in the USA (1956–57).

Simpson served as Deputy Secretary, Department of Education and Science from 1973 to 1982. He received a CB, Companion of the Order of the Bath, in 1976 recognizing his contributions to the field of education, and retired in 1982.

On his retirement in 1982, Simpson continued to be involved in education as Chairman of the National Assessment Panel for the Schools’ Curriculum Award (1983–95), held fellowships at the Universities of Birmingham and Warwick, and served as Chair of Governors of Dixon's City Technology College in Bradford from 1989 to 1999, which involved overseeing the building of the college from a greenfield site. He was a Governor of Bishop Grosseteste University in Lincoln from 1984 to 1989 and awarded an Honorary Doctorate in July 1992.

== Published works ==
Simpson published an article on the measurement of diversity in Nature in 1949. Subsequently, "The Interpretation of Interaction in Contingency Tables" was published in 1951 in the Journal of the Royal Statistical Society. This is the paper that gave rise to the phrase Simpson's paradox twenty years later.

At the age of 95, Simpson contributed two chapters on the cryptanalytic process Banburismus, developed by Alan Turing at Bletchley Park during World War II, to a review of the code-breaking project published in 2017.

== Personal ==
Edward Simpson was the only son of Hugh and Mary Simpson, of Brookfield, Ballymena, County Antrim. In 1947, he married Rebecca Gibson of Ernevale, Kesh, County Fermanagh. She had also been working in the Italian Naval Section at GCHQ during WWII and both transferred to work on JN-25. Rebecca predeceased Edward in 2012. They had one son and one daughter, and four grandchildren.
