= Edward Sydney Simpson =

Australian mineralogist and geochemist

Edward Sydney Simpson (11 March 1875 – 30 August 1939) was an Australian mineralogist and geochemist.

Simpson was born in Woollahra, New South Wales to an Irish father and English mother. He was educated at Sydney Grammar School and the University of Sydney where he graduated B.E. with honours, in 1895 and D.Sc. in 1919.

Simpson worked at the Rivertree silver mill, New South Wales and then for the Mount Morgan Gold-Mining Company in Queensland. In 1897 he became mineralogist and assayer with the Geological Survey of Western Australia. He helped to establish the Western Australian School of Mines.

Simpson was a founder of the Natural History and Science Society of Western Australia and its successor, the Royal Society of Western Australia which awarded him the Kelvin Medal in 1929. He was awarded the Clarke Medal by the Royal Society of New South Wales in 1934.

Simpson published A Key to Mineral Groups, Species and Varieties in 1932 and a three-volume set Minerals of Western Australia was published after his death.

Awards
Preceded by Walter George Woolnough	Clarke Medal; 1934	Succeeded by G. W. Card
