= Freddy Simpson =

English footballer

Personal information
- Full name: Charles Fred Simpson
- Date of birth: 1883
- Place of birth: Lincoln, England
- Positions: Inside left; outside left

Senior career*
Years	Team	Apps	(Gls)
- Midland Athletic
1902–1908	Lincoln City	124	(37)
–	Newark Town		
–	Worksop Town		
- * Club domestic league appearances and goals

Charles Fred Simpson (1883 – after 1907) was an English professional footballer who scored 37 goals from 124 appearances in the Football League playing as an inside left or outside left for Lincoln City.

Simpson was born in 1883 in Lincoln. He made his debut for Lincoln City on 6 September 1902 in a 3–1 defeat to Manchester City in the Football League Second Division, and played for the club until the end of the 1907–08 season. In the 1903–04 season, Simpson was the club's leading scorer, with 11 goals from League and FA Cup games. In total, Simpson scored 39 goals from 133 senior appearances, despite the last two years of his Lincoln career being interrupted by injury, before moving on to Newark Town and Worksop Town.
