= Paul Hardrock Simpson =

Long distance runner

"Hardrock" Simpson
Personal information
- Born: September 2, 1904 North Carolina, U.S.
- Died: July 3, 1978 (aged 73) Durham, North Carolina

Sport
- Country: United States
- Event: Ultra Marathon

Paul James "Hardrock" Simpson, Sr. (September 2, 1904 – July 3, 1978) ran ultra distances and extreme races beginning in the late 1920s and continuing into the 1950s. Simpson was a letter carrier for the United States Postal Service in Burlington, North Carolina. Simpson made a name for himself by winning a long-distance race against a horse, and went on to compete in numerous distance races as long as across the continent. The horse died as a result of the race. Simpson was a 1931 graduate of Elon University.

In 1928, Simpson competed in the Trans-American Footrace from Los Angeles to New York City. Almost two hundred people began the race, but only fifty-five reached the finish line; Simpson was among them, placing 36th. His participation was documented in a 2002 ITVS documentary, The Great American Footrace. In a second transcontinental race, Simpson finished 5th amongst nineteen finishers.

Simpson endeared himself to baseball fans in the Carolina League by running around the inside of the Burlington Athletic Stadium during every minute of the games.

Sports Illustrated wrote that Hardrock celebrated his 56th birthday last month by running 56 miles in eight hours. "Any man can run long distances if he works up to it gradually," says Hardrock. But what makes him run? "Well," says Hardrock crisply, "I guess I just like it."

Simpson was married to Ruby Braxton. He died in 1978 in Durham, North Carolina.
