= Edward Simpson (cricketer) =

English cricketer (1867–1944)

Edward Thornhill Beckett Simpson (5 March 1867 – 20 March 1944) was an English amateur first-class cricketer. He was educated at Harrow School and Pembroke College, Oxford, and played eight games for Oxford University in 1888, and one game for Yorkshire County Cricket Club in 1889. He also appeared for Lord Hawke's XI in 1889, and in non first-class cricket for Yorkshire in 1891. Simpson scored 205 runs in all matches, with by far his best knock his 82 for Oxford against the Gentlemen of England. He took thirteen catches in the field.

Born in Crofton, near Wakefield, Yorkshire, England, Simpson died in March 1944 in Walton, Wakefield.
