= Jack Nightingale =

English footballer

Personal information
- Full name: John Gladstone Nightingale
- Date of birth: 1899
- Place of birth: Oldbury, England
- Date of death: 1967 (aged 68)
- Place of death: Brighton, England
- Height: 5 ft 6 in (1.68 m)
- Position: Outside right

Senior career*
Years	Team	Apps	(Gls)
1918–191?	Brandhall Rovers		
191?–1919	Kidderminster Harriers		
1919–1920	Wolverhampton Wanderers	3	(0)
1920–1921	Shrewsbury Town		
1921–1927	Brighton & Hove Albion	182	(33)
1927–19??	Shrewsbury Town		
- * Club domestic league appearances and goals

John Gladstone Nightingale (1899–1967) was an English professional footballer who made 185 Football League appearances playing as an outside right for Wolverhampton Wanderers and Brighton & Hove Albion, where he spent the majority of his career.

== Life and career ==
Nightingale was born in 1899 in Oldbury, which was then in Worcestershire. He played non-league football for Brandhall Rovers and Kidderminster Harriers before joining Wolverhampton Wanderers in late 1919. He played three Second Division matches, but was released at the end of the season and joined Shrewsbury Town of the Birmingham & District League. Brighton & Hove Albion of the Third Division South paid £100 for his services in 1921, and he went on to make nearly 200 first-team appearances over six years, and was a regular at outside right for the last four of the six. He then rejoined Shrewsbury Town in 1927. Nightingale lived in Brighton in his later years, and died in the town in 1967 at the age of 68.
