= Matthew Simpson (footballer) =

Australian rules footballer

Personal information
- Full name: Kevin Matthew Simpson
- Born: 9 April 1967 (age 59)
- Original team: Mayne (QAFL)
- Height: 175 cm (5 ft 9 in)
- Weight: 73 kg (161 lb)

Playing career^{1}
Years	Club	Games (Goals)
1988	Brisbane Bears	9 (2)
- ^{1} Playing statistics correct to the end of 1988.

Matthew Simpson (born Kevin Matthew Simpson 9 April 1967) is a former Australian rules footballer who played with the Brisbane Bears in the Victorian Football League (VFL) and West Adelaide Football Club in the South Australian National Football League (SANFL).

Originally from Mayne Australian Football Club in the Queensland Australian Football League (QAFL), Simpson was a zone selection for the Bears at the end of the 1987 VFL season.

Simpson made nine appearances for Brisbane in the 1988 VFL season, with his best performance coming in a win over Richmond when he was awarded two Brownlow Medal votes for his 22 disposal game.

Simpson was delisted by Brisbane at the end of the 1989 VFL season and transferred to South Australian National Football League club West Adelaide, and was a member of their Grand Final team in 1991 that lost to North Adelaide 21 22 (146) to 11 7 (73). During the 2nd quarter of the game, Simpson was running for the ball towards the boundary line under the scoreboard when he was hit over the ear from behind with a clenched fist by North Adelaide's Steven Sims just as he had grabbed the ball and was crossing the boundary line. The blow knocked Simpson out and he took no further part in the game. The incident was also the start of what would be at least four all-in brawls during the rest of the game with Sims a particular target for West Adelaide's players.
