= Thomas Simpson (footballer) =

Australian rules footballer

Tom Simpson

Personal information
- Full name: Thomas James Simpson
- Born: 6 April 1933
- Died: 29 February 2016 (aged 82); Ballarat, Victoria
- Original team: East Ballarat
- Height: 174 cm (5 ft 9 in)
- Weight: 73.5 kg (162 lb)

Playing career^{1}
| Years | Club | Games (Goals) |
| 1956–1963 | Richmond | 126 (6) |
- ^{1} Playing statistics correct to the end of 1963.

Thomas James Simpson (6 April 1933 – 29 February 2016) was an Australian rules football player who played in the VFL between 1956 and 1963 for the Richmond Football Club.
