= Jane Simpson (footballer) =

New Zealand footballer

Personal information
- Full name: Jane Simpson
- Date of birth: 4 February 1971 (age 55)
- Place of birth: New Zealand

International career
| Years | Team | Apps | (Gls) |
| 1997–2004 | New Zealand | 17 | (1) |

Jane Simpson (born 4 February 1971) is an association football player who represented New Zealand at international level.

Simpson made her Football Ferns as a substitute in a 0–2 loss to Australia on 19 November 1997, and finished her international career with 17 caps and one goal to her credit.
