= Peter Simpson (anaesthetist) =

British anaesthetist

Sir Peter Simpson FRCA FRCP

President, Royal College of Anaesthetists
- In office 2003–2006

Personal details
- Born: Peter Jeffery Simpson; 17 December 1946 (age 79)
- Occupation: Anaesthetist

Sir Peter Jeffery Simpson (born 17 December 1946) is an English anaesthetist who was the President of the Royal College of Anaesthetists from 2003 to 2006. He was knighted in June 2006 for his services to the National Health Service.
