= Jane Simpson (artist) =

British artist (born 1965)

Jane Simpson (born 1965) is a British artist who lives and works in Carmarthenshire. She primarily produces sculptures, using diverse elements such as ice, silicone rubber, wood, precious metals, glass, ceramics and household objects including items bought at flea markets and on eBay.

== Early life and education ==
Simpson was born in Swansea, Wales. She graduated from the Chelsea School of Art in London in 1988 and earned an MFA from the Royal Academy of Art in London in 1993. In 1994 she was included in the seminal exhibition Some Went Mad, Some Ran Away, curated by Damien Hirst, at the Serpentine Gallery, London. Simpson's work was also part of the controversial Sensation exhibition of 1997.

== Artwork and career ==
Simpson is well known for her sculptures, which involve various materials, from rubber casting techniques to sewing machines connected to refrigeration units so that they become covered with a layer of frost. Regarding her work, Simpson has said "I think of it as a marriage of two different technologies."

Simpson is also the current production manager of a portfolio of prints called House of Fairy Tales, which includes work by Dexter Dalwood, Cornelia Parker, Sir Peter Blake and Gavin Turk.

In 2014 Simpson returned to live in Swansea and opened an art gallery in the city.

== Notable exhibitions and collections ==
Recent solo exhibitions include: A Three Way Conversation with Myself at the New Art Centre, Roche Court, Wiltshire (2005); “Tableau at CAC Malaga (2004); and Somewhere (between freezing and melting) there lies passion at both Galería Javier López, Madrid and Sandra Gering Gallery, New York (2004). Recent group exhibitions include kissingcousins curated by Jane Simpson and Sarah Staton at the Henry Moore Institute, Leeds (2007); Weather Report (Art and Climate Change) at the Centro Atlántico de Arte Moderno, Canary Islands (2007); and the Valencia Biennale (2005).

Simpson's work is part of many public and private collections including the Arts Council of England, Damien Hirst's Murderme Collection, the British Council and the Colección Ciudad de Pamplona. Four of her works were in the Saatchi Collection. In 2000, the Tate purchased her piece Sunset Still Life, a color inkjet print of a photograph of a modern still life composed of Tupperware and plastic cups. Her lithograph Swiss Cottage was also purchased by the Tate in 2008.
