= Steve Simpson (baseball) =

American baseball player (1948–1989)

- Pitcher
- Born: August 30, 1948; St. Joseph, Missouri, U.S.
- Died: November 2, 1989 (aged 41); Omaha, Nebraska, U.S.
- Batted: Right Threw: Right

MLB debut
- September 10, 1972, for the San Diego Padres

Last MLB appearance
- October 3, 1972, for the San Diego Padres

MLB statistics
- Win–loss record: 0–2
- Earned run average: 4.76
- Strikeouts: 9
- Stats at Baseball Reference

Teams
- San Diego Padres (1972)

Steven Edward Simpson (August 30, 1948 – November 2, 1989) was an American professional baseball player whose career extended from 1970 through 1974.

Born in St. Joseph, Missouri, He was a 6 ft 3 in (1.91 m), 200 lb (91 kg) right-handed pitcher who appeared in nine Major league games, all in relief, for the San Diego Padres in 1972. In 11⅓ innings pitched, he allowed five earned runs, ten hits and eight bases on balls, with nine strikeouts. He dropped both of his big league decisions, on September 18, 1972, against the Los Angeles Dodgers and on September 29 against the Houston Astros.

Simpson died of a heart attack at age 41 in 1989 in Omaha, Nebraska.
