= Frank Simpson (cricketer) =

British Army officer, cricketer & rugby union player

Frank William Simpson
- Born: 27 March 1909; Theberton, Suffolk, England
- Died: 13 August 1992 (aged 83); Winchester, Hampshire, England
- Military career
- Allegiance: United Kingdom
- Branch: British Army
- Service years: 1929−1959
- Rank: Colonel
- Service number: 45185
- Unit: Royal Engineers
- Conflicts: Second World War: Battle of Normandy
- Awards: Distinguished Service Order; Officer of the Order of the British Empire
- Cricket career

Cricket information
- Batting: Right-handed
- Bowling: Right arm medium

Domestic team information
- Years: Team
- 1931: Army
- 1948: Combined Services
- FC debut: 15 August 1931 Army v MCC
- Last FC: 30 June 1948 Combined Services v Glamorgan

Career statistics
Competition	First-class
Matches	2
Runs scored	92
Batting average	23.00
100s/50s	0/0
Top score	40
Catches/stumpings	1/0
- Source: CricketArchive, 24 December 2007

Colonel Frank William Simpson DSO OBE (27 March 1909 – 13 August 1992) was a British Army officer who also played cricket, including two first-class games, for various military teams between 1931 and 1954, also playing for the Straits Settlements in 1938 and 1939.

== Biography ==
Simpson was born in Suffolk on 27 March 1909 and educated at Merchant Taylors' School, Crosby and at Trinity Hall, Cambridge. He then went on to Royal Military Academy Sandhurst and was commissioned into the Royal Engineers as a second lieutenant on 29 August 1929. He made his first-class cricket debut in August 1931, playing for the Army against the Marylebone Cricket Club (MCC) at Lord's as a right-handed batsman and right-arm medium pace bowler. He was promoted lieutenant on 29 August 1932. He was placed on half-pay due to ill-health on 13 April 1936, and returned to full duty, but with reduced seniority, on 15 July 1936.

== Second World War ==
He played two matches for the Straits Settlements against the Federated Malay States in 1938 and 1939. He was appointed as an adjutant on 28 January 1939 and served throughout the Second World War. By the Normandy Landings he was a substantive captain and temporary major. He was landed in France at 0900 on D-Day in command of 26 and 80 Assault Squadrons, Royal Engineers, in the "Nan Red" sector of Juno Beach. The task of these squadrons, which had only been formed three months previously, was to clear exits through the defences at the top of the beach so that the largely Canadian forces landed there could breakout into the country beyond. One exit "N7" was opened as planned but one troop of AVRE armoured vehicles was landed some distance away from their intended position, and this, combined with a very high-tide, delayed the opening of exit "N6". Simpson managed to reorganise his available forces to open this exit, and some additional ones which were not in the original plans. He also made use of his vehicles to support infantry which was being harassed by snipers hidden in buildings, and organised the traffic on the beach to clear the developing log-jam of men and vehicles. His squadrons also filled a large shell crater in Bernières-sur-Mer which was blocking the way. Despite heavy fire of all types, he moved around on foot, or on borrowed motorcycles. As a result, he was recommended for the immediate award of the Distinguished Service Order, which was made on 31 August 1944.

== Post-war ==
After the war, Simpson remained in the Army, and became a substantive major on 1 July 1946. He also continued with his cricket, playing for the Army against the Minor Counties in August 1947, and played his second, and final, first-class match for the Combined Services against Glamorgan in Pontypridd in 1948. He was promoted lieutenant colonel on 31 July 1951, and was posted to the Ministry of Defence in September. Initially he was a secretary to the Joint War Production Committee of the United States and Canada, and then from August 1952 he was responsible for briefing the UK NATO representatives on those issues. He was also a secretary to the committee working to standardise military stores. His posting was completed in September 1953, and as a result he was appointed an Officer of the Order of the British Empire (OBE) in the 1954 New Year Honours, the counter-signing officer also commented: "Quite apart from his work here, this officer deserves recognition for his services to Army cricket and rugger [Rugby union] over a long period." He then commanded a Royal Engineers regiment until 31 July 1954, that year he also played cricket for the Army against Hampshire and for the Royal Engineers against the Royal Artillery at Lord's. He was promoted colonel on 29 January 1955, and retired from the army on 29 April 1959. He died in Hampshire in 1992.
