= Melissa Martínez =

American actress

- Born: Melissa Maria Margarita Martínez Romero; November 14, 1979 (age 46); Barranquilla, Atlántico, Colombia
- Occupations: Actress, television host
- Years active: 1998–present
- Website: melissamartinez.com

Melissa Martínez, (full name: Melissa Maria Margarita Martinez Romero; born on November 14, 1979, in Barranquilla), is a Colombian-born American actress and hostess.

== Early life ==
Martínez was born in Barranquilla, Colombia. She is the daughter of Nelly Romero Sosa, a journalist, actress and radio personality, and Guillermo Martinez Navarro, a journalist and radio personality as well. She began her interest in the artistic industry at 8 years old, when her mom took her to be part of a scene in the comedy TV show she was doing in Barranquilla called "Que Sainete". Since then, Martínez participated in plays, dance shows, choir, and the school orchestra as a lead singer. She attended Catholic school and graduated with a degree in social communications and journalism at Uniatonoma del Caribe University in her home town.

== Career ==
Martínez has made numerous television appearance as herself. From 1998 through 2000 at the same time that Martínez was studying social communication she was working as a lead actress in the comedy show called Cual es la Vaina (What is the Matter) in Barranquilla, Colombia.

2007, she worked as a co-host and model for the Telemundo show Buena Fortuna on Telemundo. In the same year she was named Miss Congeniality at the Long Beach Grand Prix in Long Beach, California.

2008, Martínez had a supporting role in the film The Crown Underneath Her Feet.

2009, she starred in the film Life vs Death. In the same year, she shot a comedy pilot for NBC called The Good Life and was the weather girl on Canal 22 (Channel 22), a Spanish TV station in Los Angeles.

2011, appeared as the lead actress and model in the Mexican singer Cristian Castro's music video "Lo Dudo".

2012, Martínez hosted a mystical and Entertainment national show on LATV.

Currently, Martínez is doing what she loves the most, Comedy in the national TV show El Pelado de la Noche on Azteca America

== Filmography ==
Year	Title	Role
2007	Buena Fortuna	Herself as co-host/model/dancer
2008	The Crown underneath her feet	Supporting role
2009	Life vs Death	Devil (starring role)
2009	The good Life	Maria (supporting role)
2009	Noticias 22	Herself / co-host
2011	Video Lo Dudo for famous Mexican singer Cristian Castro	Herself
2012	Astroloko	Herself / co-host
2012	El Pelado de la Noche	Herself / comedy main cast
