= Mike Simpson (American football) =

American football player (born 1947)

No. 38
- Position: Defensive back

Personal information
- Born: March 13, 1947 (age 79); Mena, Arkansas, U.S.
- Listed height: 5 ft 9 in (1.75 m)
- Listed weight: 170 lb (77 kg)

Career information
- High school: Port Neches–Groves (Port Neches, Texas)
- College: Houston (1965–1968)
- NFL draft: 1969: 13th round, 330th overall pick

Career history
- San Diego Chargers (1969)*; San Francisco 49ers (1970–1973); Baltimore Colts (1974)*; Houston Oilers (1975)*
- * Offseason or practice squad member only

Career NFL statistics
- Interceptions: 3
- Fumble recoveries: 1
- Touchdowns: 1
- Stats at Pro Football Reference

Michael Harry Simpson (born March 13, 1947) is an American former professional football player who was a defensive back for four seasons with the San Francisco 49ers of the National Football League (NFL). He was selected by the San Diego Chargers in the thirteenth round of the 1969 NFL/AFL draft after playing college football for the Houston Cougars.

== Early life ==
Michael Harry Simpson was born on March 13, 1947, in Mena, Arkansas. His family moved to Texas when he was young, with Simpson being raised in Groves, Texas. He played high school football at Port Neches–Groves High School in Port Neches, Texas. He earned all-district honors in 1964 as a running back. He also participated in track and field in high school, and was the lead runner on the 1965 four-man 440 relay team that set a national record with 41.2 seconds. He graduated in 1965. Simpson's high school football coach was Bum Phillips, who he followed to the University of Houston in 1965.

== College career ==
Simpson was a member of the Houston Cougars from 1965 to 1968 and a three-year letterman from 1966 to 1968. While at the University of Houston, Simpson mentored Larry Gatlin in the guitar.

== Professional career ==
Simpson was selected by the San Diego Chargers in the 13th round, with the 330th overall pick, of the 1969 NFL/AFL draft. He was released by the Chargers on September 3, 1969.

Simpson signed with the San Francisco 49ers in 1970. He played in seven games for the 49ers during the 1970 season. He also appeared in one playoff game that season. He appeared in eight games, starting one, in 1971 and recorded one interception. Simpson also appeared in two playoff games that year. He played in 13 games, starting nine, in 1972, totaling two interceptions for 32 yards and one touchdown. He started one playoff game that season as well. Simpson played in 13 games for the second consecutive season in 1973, starting seven, and recorded one fumble recovery.

On March 29, 1974, Simpson was traded to the Baltimore Colts for a 1976 seventh round draft pick. He was released by the Colts on September 10, 1974.

Simpson was signed by the Houston Oilers in 1975 but was later released.
