= Scott Simpson (pole vaulter) =

Welsh pole vaulter

Personal information
- Nationality: British
- Born: 1 July 1979 (age 46) Bath, England

Sport
- Sport: Athletics
- Event: Pole vault
- Club: Birchfield Harriers

Scott Simpson (born 21 July 1979) is a former pole vaulter who represented Wales.

== Biography ==
Born in Bath, England. He finished runner-up three times at the British national level, at the AAA Championships in 2004 and 2006 and the British Athletics Championships in 2008.

Simpson represented Wales at the 2006 Commonwealth Games in Melbourne, where he finished sixth.

His personal best jump is 5.41 metres, achieved in 2006. He has 5.42 metres on the indoor track, achieved in March 2007 in Sheffield.

He is the head coach of Welsh Athletics and also the coach of British pole vaulter Holly Bradshaw.
