= Peter Simpson (footballer, born 1940) =

English footballer

Personal information
- Full name: Peter Wilson Simpson
- Date of birth: 21 September 1940 (age 86)
- Place of birth: Sunderland, England
- Position: Inside forward

Senior career*
Years	Team	Apps	(Gls)
1957–1963	Burnley	3	(0)
1963–1964	Bury	4	(0)
1964	Boston Metros		
1965–1966	Toronto Italia Falcons		
1967	Toronto Falcons	13	(0)
1968	Sudbury Italia		
1969–1970	Vancouver Spartans		
- * Club domestic league appearances and goals

Peter Wilson Simpson (born 21 September 1940) is an English former professional footballer. He played as an inside forward.

== Career ==
He joined the Burnley first team in 1957 but did not play a game for the club until the 1961–62 season. His debut for the Clarets came in the 0–4 defeat to Sheffield Wednesday on 30 April 1962. He went on to make a total of three games in the league for Burnley before joining Bury in 1963. He only stayed with Bury for one season, making four league appearances for the club. After the conclusion of the English season he played abroad in the United States with Boston Metros in 1964.

In 1965, he played in the Eastern Canada Professional Soccer League with Toronto Italia Falcons. He re-signed with Toronto for the 1966 season. In 1967, he played in the National Professional Soccer League with Toronto Falcons. The following season he played in the National Soccer League with Sudbury Italia. In his debut season with Sudbury he assisted in securing the league championship. After the conclusion of the NSL season he signed with Vancouver Spartans of the Western Canada Soccer League. He returned to play with Vancouver for the 1970 season.

He then to USA where he played for New York, Boston, and Chicago. Back in Canada, he won the 1969 Challenge Trophy with Vancouver Columbus FC after a 10–0 win over Montréal Ukrainia at the Canadian national championship.
