= Andrew Clive Simpson =

British computer scientist

Andrew Clive Simpson is a British Computer Scientist. He is Director of Studies, Software Engineering Programme at University of Oxford. He is Governing Body Fellow of Kellogg College.

== Biography ==
He obtained first class BSc (Hons) in Computer Science from University of Wales, Swansea (1989–1992); followed by MSc in Computation (1992–1993) and DPhil in Computation (1993–1996) from University of Oxford.

== Career ==
Before his current post he was research officer in Oxford University Computing Laboratory (now the Oxford University Department of Computer Science)(1996–1999) and Principal Lecturer in Computing at Oxford Brookes University (1999–2001).

== Publications ==
Andrew Simpson's publications covers a wide range of topics covering Software Engineering, Computational Biology, Security, and Formal Methods.
