= Thomas Simpson (composer) =

English composer in Germany (1582–c1628)

Thomas Simpson (Kent, 1582 – c. 1628) was an English composer who worked in Germany. Simpson, a generation younger than William Brade is first heard of at Heidelberg in 1608.
