= USS Simpson =

Two ships in the United States Navy have been named USS Simpson. The first was named for Rear Admiral Edward Simpson and the second was named for Rear Admiral Rodger W. Simpson.

- The first USS Simpson (DD-221) was a Clemson-class destroyer, commissioned in 1920 and decommissioned in 1946.
- The second USS Simpson (FFG-56) was an Oliver Hazard Perry-class guided missile frigate, commissioned in 1985 and decommissioned in 2015.
