= Admiral Simpson =

Admiral Simpson may refer to:

- Edward Simpson (governor) (1860–1930), U.S. Navy rear admiral
- Edward Simpson (naval officer) (1824–1888), U.S. Navy rear admiral
- Enrique Simpson (1835–1901), Chilean Navy counter admiral
- George Simpson (Royal Navy officer) (1901–1972), British Royal Navy rear admiral
- Robert Winthrop Simpson (1799–1877), British-born Chilean Navy rear admiral
- Rodger W. Simpson (1898–1964), U.S. Navy rear admiral

== See also ==
- Beau "Cyclone" Simpson, fictional vice admiral in the 2022 film, Top Gun: Maverick
- John Simpson, fictional admiral in the 1632 novel series
- Robert Simpson-Anderson (born 1942), South African Navy vice admiral
