= USS Miami (CL-89) =

Light cruiser of the United States Navy

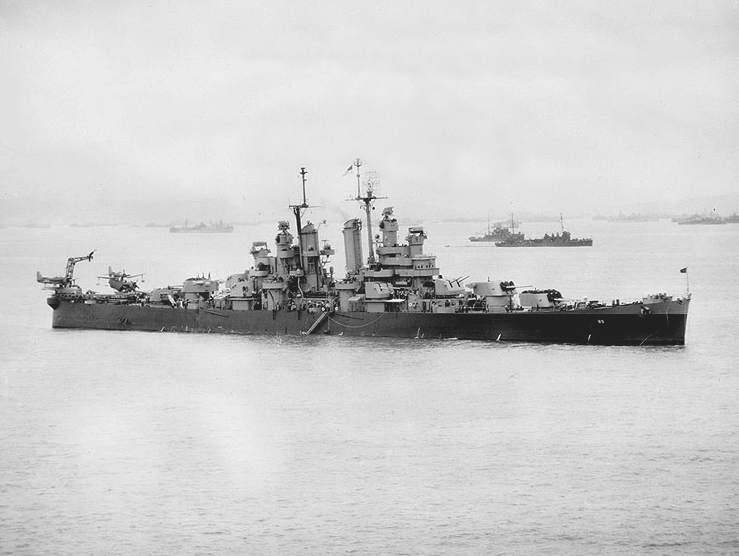
- USS Miami at anchor in 1945

History

United States
- Name: USS Miami
- Namesake: City of Miami, Florida
- Builder: Cramp Shipbuilding Co., Philadelphia
- Laid down: 2 August 1941
- Launched: 8 December 1942
- Commissioned: 28 December 1943
- Decommissioned: 30 June 1947
- Stricken: 1 September 1961
- Fate: Sold for scrap on 20 July 1962

General characteristics
- Class & type: Cleveland-class light cruiser
- Displacement: Standard: 11,744 long tons (11,932 t); Full load: 14,131 long tons (14,358 t)
- Length: 610 ft 1 in (185.95 m)
- Beam: 66 ft 4 in (20.22 m)
- Draft: 24 ft 6 in (7.47 m)
- Installed power: 4 × Babcock & Wilcox boilers; 100,000 shp (75,000 kW)
- Propulsion: 4 × steam turbines; 4 × screw propellers
- Speed: 32.5 knots (60.2 km/h; 37.4 mph)
- Range: 11,000 nmi (20,000 km; 13,000 mi) at 15 kn (28 km/h; 17 mph)
- Complement: 1,285 officers and enlisted
- Armament: 12 × 6 in (152 mm) Mark 16 guns; 12 × 5 in (127 mm)/38 caliber guns; 28 × 40 mm (1.6 in) Bofors anti-aircraft guns; 10 × 20 mm (0.79 in) Oerlikon anti-aircraft guns
- Armor: Belt: 3.5–5 in (89–127 mm); Deck: 2 in (51 mm); Barbettes: 6 in (152 mm); Turrets: 6 in (152 mm); Conning Tower: 5 in (127 mm)
- Aircraft carried: 4 × floatplanes
- Aviation facilities: 2 × stern catapults

USS Miami (hull number: CL-89) was a Cleveland-class light cruiser of the United States Navy, which were built during World War II. The class was designed as a development of the earlier Brooklyn-class cruisers, the size of which had been limited by the First London Naval Treaty. The start of the war led to the dissolution of the treaty system, but the dramatic need for new vessels precluded a new design, so the Clevelands used the same hull as their predecessors, but were significantly heavier. The Clevelands carried a main battery of twelve 6-inch (152 mm) guns in four three-gun turrets, along with a secondary armament of twelve 5 in (127 mm) dual-purpose guns. They had a top speed of 32.5 knots (60.2 km/h; 37.4 mph).

Miami was commissioned in December 1943, and saw service in several campaigns in the Pacific. Like almost all her sister ships, she was decommissioned shortly after the end of the war, and never saw active service again. Miami was scrapped in the early 1960s.

== Design ==
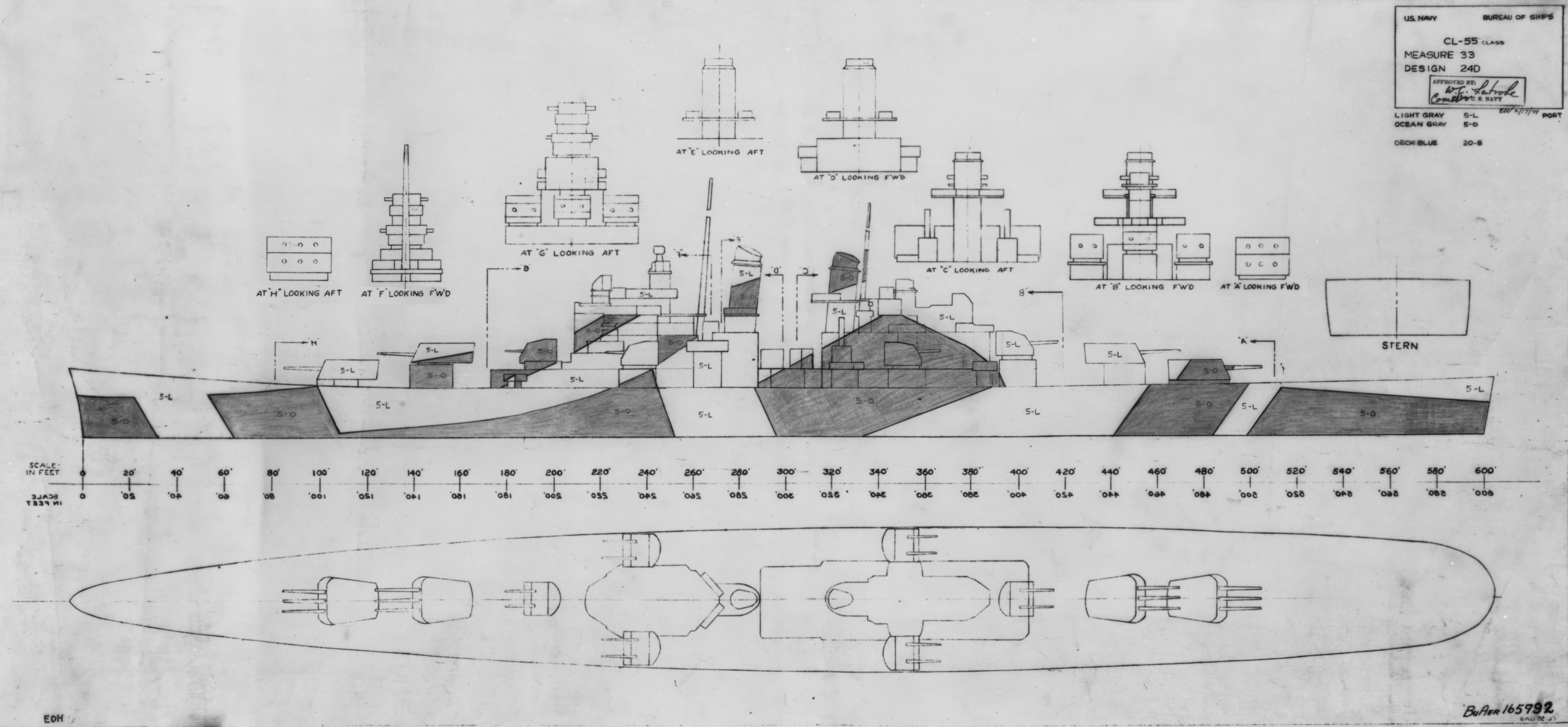
Depiction of the Cleveland class, showing the plan and profile

The Cleveland-class light cruisers traced their origin to design work done in the late 1930s; at the time, light cruiser displacement was limited to 8,000 long tons (8,100 t) by the Second London Naval Treaty. Following the start of World War II in September 1939, Britain announced it would suspend the treaty for the duration of the conflict, a decision the US Navy quickly followed. Though still neutral, the United States recognized that war was likely and the urgent need for additional ships ruled out an entirely new design, so the Clevelands were a close development of the earlier Brooklyn-class cruisers, the chief difference being the substitution of a two-gun 5 in (127 mm) dual-purpose gun mount for one of the main battery 6 in (152 mm) gun turrets.

Miami was 610 feet 1 inch (186 m) long overall and had a beam of 66 ft 4 in (20.22 m) and a draft of 24 ft 6 in (7.47 m). Her standard displacement amounted to 11,744 long tons (11,932 t) and increased to 14,131 long tons (14,358 t) at full load. The ship was powered by four General Electric steam turbines, each driving one propeller shaft, using steam provided by four oil-fired Babcock & Wilcox boilers. Rated at 100,000 shaft horsepower (75,000 kW), the turbines were intended to give a top speed of 32.5 knots (60.2 km/h; 37.4 mph). Her crew numbered 1285 officers and enlisted men.

The ship was armed with a main battery of twelve 6 in /47-caliber Mark 16 guns (Note: /47 refers to the length of the gun in terms of calibers. A /47 gun is 47 times long as it is in bore diameter.) in four 3-gun turrets on the centerline. Two were placed forward in a superfiring pair; the other two turrets were placed aft of the superstructure in another superfiring pair. The secondary battery consisted of twelve 5 in (127 mm) /38-caliber dual-purpose guns mounted in twin turrets. Two of these were placed on the centerline, one directly behind the forward main turrets and the other just forward of the aft turrets. Two more were placed abreast of the conning tower and the other pair on either side of the aft superstructure. Anti-aircraft defense consisted of twenty-eight Bofors 40 mm (1.6 in) guns in four quadruple and six double mounts and ten Oerlikon 20 mm (0.79 in) guns in single mounts.

The ship's belt armor ranged in thickness from 3.5 to 5 in (89 to 127 mm), with the thicker section amidships where it protected the ammunition magazines and propulsion machinery spaces. Her deck armor was 2 in (51 mm) thick. The main battery turrets were protected with 6.5 in (170 mm) faces and 3 in (76 mm) sides and tops, and they were supported by barbettes 6 inches thick. Miami's conning tower had 5-inch sides.

== Service history ==
=== Construction and initial training ===
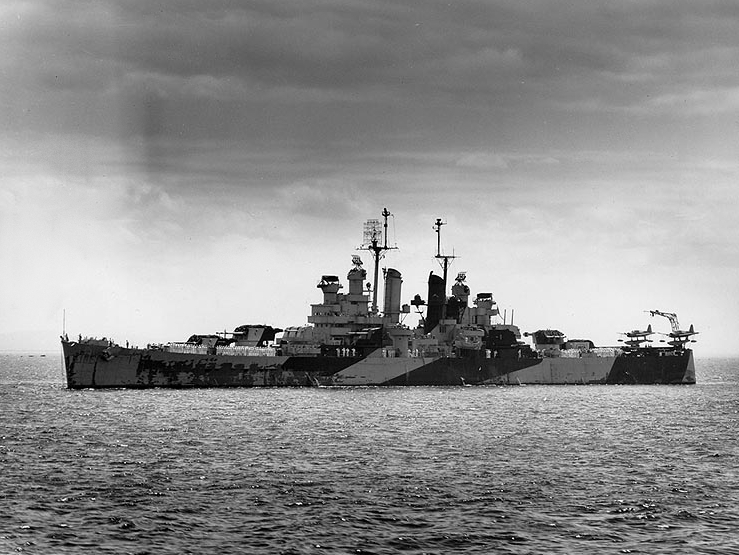
Miami off Trinidad in February 1944

The keel for Miami was laid down at William Cramp & Sons in Philadelphia on 2 August 1941. She was launched on 8 December 1942, and after completing fitting-out work, was commissioned into the fleet on 28 December 1943, with the hull number CL-89. The ship began sea trials on the Delaware River on 1 January 1944, and from 21 January to 3 February, she remained at Philadelphia for modifications and to take on a load of ammunition. She got underway on 4 February to resume training operations in Delaware Bay that lasted until 7 February, when she joined the destroyer Twiggs to sail for Chesapeake Bay for further training. On 12 February, Miami moved to the Norfolk Navy Yard in Portsmouth, Virginia, before departing two days later in company with the heavy cruiser Quincy and the destroyers Carmick and Doyle. The four ships steamed south to Trinidad in the British West Indies for a shakedown cruise. While en route, one of Miami's crew fell overboard and couldn't be found.

Over the next two weeks, Miami took part in drills with the other ships in the Gulf of Paria until 3 March, when she and Quincy left to return to Norfolk, this time escorted by the destroyers Baldwin and Thompson. They arrived four days later, where Miami was inspected by Rear Admiral Donald B. Beary. On 11 March, the ship sailed for the Naval Research Laboratory Annex in Chesapeake Bay for tests the following day. She then returned to Delaware Bay on the 13th, and then to Philadelphia on 14 March for repairs that lasted through the end of the month. On 2 April, the ship was moved to Boston, Massachusetts, departing there on 7 April for Casco Bay, Maine, where she conducted shooting practice with her sister ship Houston, the destroyer Edwards, and the destroyer escort Francis M. Robinson. After a week of practice, Miami and Edwards then sailed back to Boston on 14 April.

The Navy thereafter ordered Miami to sail for the Pacific, and she departed on 16 April. For the voyage south, she was assigned to Task Group (TG) 27.7, which also included her sisters Houston and Vincennes and the destroyers Edwards, Monssen, Broome, and Simpson. They passed through the Panama Canal on 22 April, and the next day, the unit was re-designated TG 12.3 and Broome and Simpson were detached. The rest of the ships proceeded on to San Diego, California, arriving there on 30 April. From there, the task group sailed for Pearl Harbor the next day, arriving there on 6 May. While there, Miami joined the heavy cruiser Indianapolis for training exercises on 8 May. She thereafter underwent maintenance from 13 to 24 May.

=== Operations in the Pacific Theater ===
==== Mariana and Palau Islands campaign ====
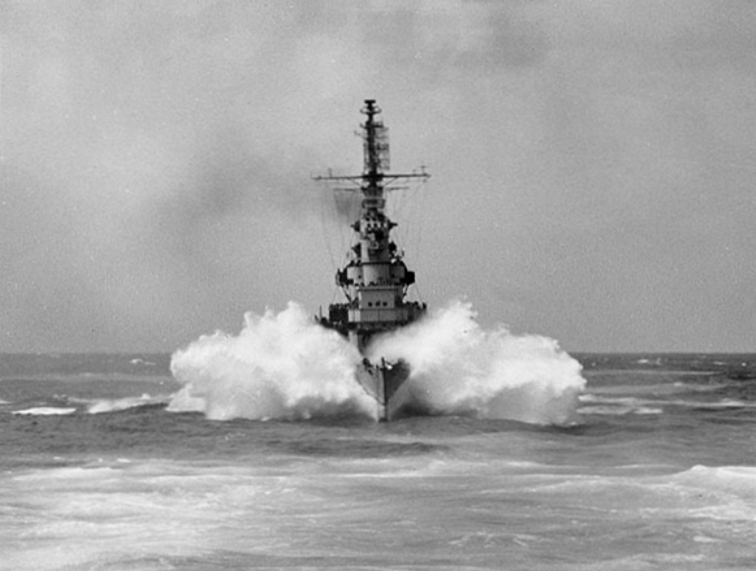
Miami steaming in heavy seas

Miami was next transferred to TG 12.1, which also included the fast battleships North Carolina and Washington, the cruisers Vincennes and Houston, the minelayer Terror, and the destroyers Dortch, Lang, McCalla, Sterett, Wilson and Cotten. The unit departed on 24 May, bound for Majuro Atoll in the Marshall Islands, and arrived there six days later. They then joined the Fast Carrier Task Force, then under the command of 5th Fleet and designated Task Force (TF) 58. Miami was assigned to the subordinate unit TG 58.4, which also included the aircraft carriers Essex, Langley, and Cowpens. The American fleet embarked on the Mariana and Palau Islands campaign, beginning with air strikes against Japanese positions on Saipan on 11 June and continuing over the following week. Miami contributed to the fleet's anti-aircraft defenses when the Japanese launched an aerial counterattack on 19 June, though she was not heavily engaged. Later that day, the ship's secondary guns opened fire on what was believed to be a Japanese submarine but was in fact merely an abandoned sampan.

Miami continued to escort the carriers as they launched air strikes in support of the invasion of Saipan until 27 June, when she was detached as part of Task Unit 58.4.5 and sent to bombard Guam before American forces landed on that island as well. The unit included Houston and five destroyers. In addition to Japanese positions on the island, Miami shelled a cargo ship that was moored in Apra Harbor. A Japanese coastal artillery battery on the Orote Peninsula engaged Miami during the bombardment, and the latter eventually silenced the Japanese guns. Miami and the other vessels thereafter returned to their positions screening the carriers. On 6 July, Miami was sent to Eniwetok to replenish stores and ammunition before returning to the fleet on 14 June. By that time, she had been transferred to TG 58.3, which was centered on the carriers Bunker Hill, Lexington, and San Jacinto. The ships anchored at Saipan on 31 July, by which time had been secured by American forces. The next morning, the ships sortied to carry out a raid on Japanese installations on Iwo Jima. Miami was again detached for replenishment and maintenance at Eniwetok on 11 August. She joined TU 58.2.1 on 25 August, along with her sister Vicksburg and four destroyers.

On 26 August, Miami left the fleet to pick up the crew from a OS2U Kingfisher from the battleship Indiana, but she was recalled before she arrived. By this time, the Fast Carrier Task Force had passed to the command of the Third Fleet, and all of the units were renumbered. Miami was transferred to TG 38.2, which included the carriers Bunker Hill, Intrepid, and Hancock, the light carriers Independence and Cabot, and the fast battleships Iowa and New Jersey. She escorted the carriers that struck Japanese positions on Peleliu and Angaur in the Palau Islands on 7 September to prepare for the invasion of Peleliu. The fleet thereafter shifted its attention to Japanese airfields in the Philippines from 12 to 15 September; during this period, on the 14th, Miami picked up the pilot of an F6F Hellcat that had been shot down. The ship steamed to Saipan on 28 September to replenish ammunition and stores.

==== Philippines campaign ====
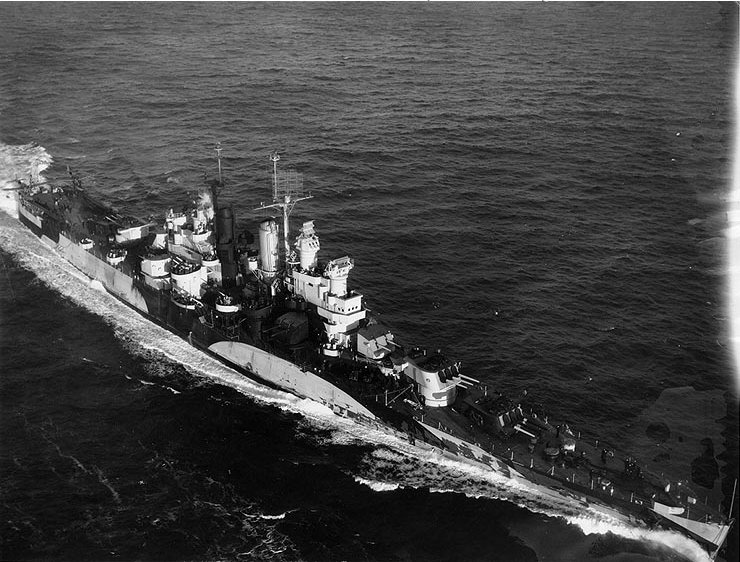
Miami underway

As the fleet began preparations for the next major campaign, Miami joined TF 34, along with the battleships Washington, New Jersey, Iowa, and Alabama and the carrier Independence for training exercises that ended the next day. Later on the 30th, Miami sailed to the fleet's advance base at Ulithi Atoll in the Caroline Islands, where she joined TG 38.2. On 6 October, Miami and the rest of the Fast Carrier Task Force sortied to conduct air strikes against Japanese installations on Okinawa and Formosa, which began on 10 October. Two days later, during strikes on Formosa, Japanese aircraft attacked the fleet, and late that day, Miami's anti-aircraft gunners shot down one aircraft and assisted in the destruction of another. In the early hours of 13 October, she shot down another Japanese aircraft. With the invasion of Leyte approaching, the fleet turned its attention to Japanese forces in the Philippines on 18 October, striking targets in Aparri and Laoag. Two days later, American forces went ashore on Leyte, leading to heavy Japanese counterattacks.

Japanese efforts to disrupt the landing culminated in the Battle of Leyte Gulf, an effort by three squadrons to attack the invasion fleet. After the American carrier task force was drawn north by a feint from the Northern Force, the main Japanese unit, the Center Force, attempted to penetrate the San Bernardino Strait. Miami remained with the carriers until the Center Force encountered a group of American escort carriers, destroyers, and destroyer escorts on the morning of 25 October. Frantic calls for support from the Fast Carrier Task Force led its commander, Admiral William Halsey Jr. to detach a group of ships, including Miami, south to stop the Center Force. By the time they arrived, the Japanese had broken off their attack, convinced they had stumbled into TF 38 itself. Miami and several cruisers and destroyers nevertheless caught and sank the destroyer Nowaki on 26 October.

The following day, Miami and the rest of TG 38.2 briefly withdrew eastward before resuming operations against Japanese forces in the Philippines. These consisted of a series of strikes on airfields on Luzon from 5 to 6 November, after which Miami was detached to return to Ulithi, where she remained from 9 to 13 November. She sortied the next day to rejoin her unit, which carried out further attacks on Luzon from 18 to 25 November. Through this period, Japanese aircraft repeatedly attacked the fleet, and during one attack on the 25th, Miami shot down a dive bomber. Another brief return to Ulithi to replenish fuel and ammunition followed the next day, and she thereafter took part in training exercises there for a week. The ship next joined TG 30.4, which sortied on 9 December to wage additional attacks on Luzon from 14 to 16 December. She was present when the fleet was struck by Typhoon Cobra on 18 December, which sank three destroyers and inflicted serious damage to several ships, including Miami. The ship had serious hull damage between frames 21 and 33. One of her Kingfishers was thrown overboard and the other was so badly damaged that the crew discarded it. She remained in the area to assist in the search for survivors before returning to Ulithi on 24 December.

After repairs were completed, Miami joined TG 38.3, which sortied on 1 January 1945 to carry out the South China Sea raid. The raid was an effort to isolate Japanese forces in the Philippines by neutralizing airfields in occupied China, Formosa, and Southeast Asia. The fleet's carriers initially struck targets on and around Formosa, turned to attack Luzon once more from 6 to 8 January, before entering the South China Sea in the early hours of 10 January. The carriers then launched strikes on Japanese-occupied French Indochina before turning back north to attack Formosa again on 15 and 16 January. On the latter day, Miami shot down an A6M5 Zero fighter. The fleet thereafter passed through the Balintang Channel and then the Luzon Strait, continuing north to launch an attack on Okinawa on 20 and 21 January. The fleet thereafter returned to Ulithi to make preparations for the next major offensive, arriving there on 27 January.

==== Volcano and Ryukyu Islands campaign ====
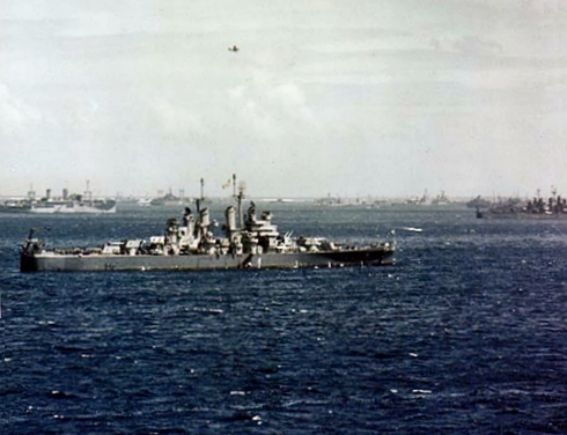
Miami preparing to depart Ulithi for the invasion of Okinawa, March 1945

On 10 February, Miami and the rest of the fleet sortied to begin its next major operation, beginning with supporting attacks for the invasion of Iwo Jima. By this time, the fleet had passed back to 5th Fleet command, and Miami had been transferred to TG 58.1. The fleet began air strikes on Tokyo on the night of 15 February, which continued over the following two days. On 18 February, the fleet sailed south to attack Japanese positions on Chichijima, followed by strikes on Okinawa from 20 to 22 February, by which time American forces had begun the invasion of Iwo Jima. Later that month, Miami was detached to form Task Unit 58.1.22 along with her sister ships Vicksburg and Vincennes, the cruiser San Diego, and fifteen destroyers. The unit carried out a raid on the island of Okidaitōjima on 2 March. Three days later, she returned to Ulithi to replenish fuel and munitions. She got underway again on 14 March and rejoined the Fast Carrier Task Force, which raided Japanese installations on Okinawa and the main island of Kyushu between 18 and 31 March. During this period, Miami helped to defend the fleet against heavy Japanese air attacks. Still part of TG 58.1, she escorted the carriers Hornet, Bennington, and Belleau Wood as they directly supported American forces during the battle of Okinawa beginning on 1 April. These operations continued through 11 April.

The next day, Miami took part in searches for American pilots who had been shot down during the fighting around Okinawa; that afternoon, Kingfishers from Miami recovered one man from the water and a further two from Amami Ōshima. On 14 April, Miami's anti-aircraft gunners claimed several Japanese planes shot down during a particularly heavy attack. TF 58 began attacks on Amami Ōshima, Tokuno Shima, and Kikaijima from 20 to 30 April. Miami returned to Ulithi later that day, remaining there for repairs and replenishment for more than a week. On 10 May, Miami departed for Pearl Harbor, sailing independently and arriving seven days later. There, she embarked passengers bound for the West Coast of the United States, and carried them to San Pedro, California. She reached the port on 24 May, unloaded ammunition, and then entered the dry dock the following day for an overhaul. The work lasted more than a month, and the ship re-entered the water on 7 July. She conducted limited trials on 14 July and was thoroughly inspected between 1 and 11 August. She departed for Pearl Harbor on 20 August, arriving four days later; by that time, Japan had announced it would surrender, ending the war. Miami left for Guam on 30 August, and while en route on 2 September, the formal surrender took place aboard the battleship Missouri. For her service during the conflict, Miami was awarded six battle stars.

=== Post-war operations ===
Miami departed for Okinawa on 9 September, accompanied by the destroyer escort Gendreau. After arriving there on 12 September, she was used to accept the surrender of Japanese garrisons in the Ryukyu Islands. Four days later, she went to sea along with TF 55 to avoid a major typhoon; she returned to Buckner Bay in Okinawa on 17 September. On 22 September, she covered the arrival of Tenth Army to begin occupation duties in the Ryukus. Another typhoon forced Miami back to sea on 3 October. Four days later, she dropped anchor in Naze, Kagoshima on the island of Amami Ōshima. After patrolling the area for several days, she returned to Buckner Bay on 15 October. She remained there until 29 October, when she got underway to visit Yokosuka, Japan, though she remained there for only a short time before sailing south to the Caroline Islands, ultimately arriving in Truk on 11 November. Her crew conducted a survey of the damage inflicted during Operation Hailstone, a major carrier raid on the atoll during the war. Miami was ordered home on 25 November, and she arrived in Long Beach, California, on 10 December.

For the next year and a half, Miami operated off the coast of California, conducting training cruises for naval reservists. She was decommissioned on 30 June 1947 and thereafter assigned to the Pacific Reserve Fleet. She remained in the Navy's inventory until 1 September 1961, when she was stricken from the naval register. The ship was then sold for scrap to the shipbreaking firm Nicholai Joffe Corp. on 26 July 1962.
