= USS Somerset =

USS Somerset may refer to:

- USS Somerset (1862), a side wheel ferryboat launched and purchased in 1862 and sold in 1865; the rejuvenated Somerset began a career as a New York ferryboat until 1914
- USS Somerset (ID-2162), a Maryland State Fisheries Force motor boat that served in World War I
- USS Somerset (AK-212), an Alamosa-class cargo ship, launched in January 1945 and struck in December 1945
- USS Somerset (LPD-25), a San Antonio-class amphibious transport dock launched in April 2012
