= USS Monssen (DD-798) =

Fletcher-class destroyer of the United States Navy

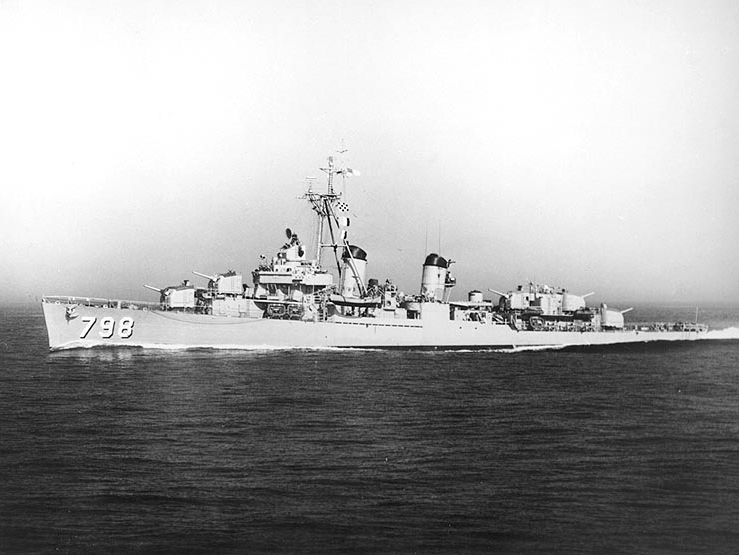
- USS Monssen (DD-798) underway after she was recommissioned, 1953.

History

United States
- Name: Monssen
- Namesake: Mons Monssen
- Builder: Bethlehem Shipbuilding Corporation's Bethlehem Mariners Harbor, Staten Island
- Laid down: 1 June 1943
- Launched: 30 October 1943
- Commissioned: 14 February 1944
- Decommissioned: 30 April 1946
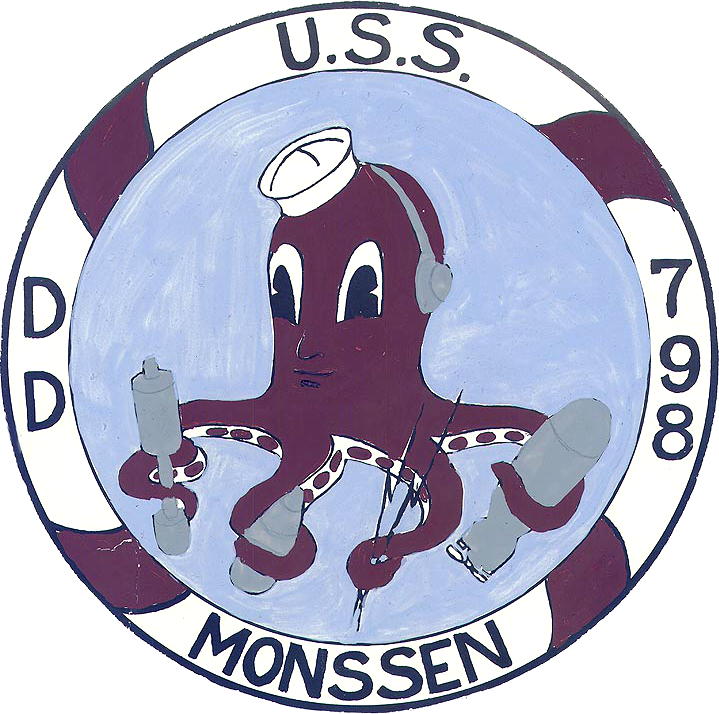
- Badge
- Recommissioned: 31 October 1951
- Decommissioned: September 1957 or 11 December 1957
- Stricken: 1 February 1963
- Identification: Hull symbol:DD-798; Code letters:NTTK
- Honors and awards: 8 × battle stars (WWII)
- Fate: Sold 21 October 1963 and scrapped

General characteristics
- Class & type: Fletcher-class destroyer
- Displacement: 2,050 long tons (2,083 t) (standard); 2,924 long tons (2,971 t) (max)
- Length: 376 ft 5 in (114.73 m) oa
- Beam: 39 ft 08 in (12.09 m)
- Draft: 13 ft 9 in (4.19 m) (max)
- Installed power: 60,000 shp (45,000 kW)
- Propulsion: geared turbines; 2 × screws
- Speed: 35 knots (65 km/h; 40 mph)
- Range: 6,500 nmi (12,000 km) at 15 kn (17 mph; 28 km/h)
- Complement: 319
- Armament: 5 × dual 5 in (130 mm)/38 caliber Dual-purpose guns; 10 × 40 mm (1.6 in) Bofors anti-aircraft guns; 7 × 20 mm (0.79 in) Oerlikon anti-aircraft cannons; 10 × 21 inch (533 mm) torpedo tubes, 6 × depth charge projectors, 2 × depth charge tracks

USS Monssen (DD-798) was a Fletcher-class destroyer of the United States Navy, the second Navy ship named for Lieutenant Mons Monssen (1867–1930), who was awarded the Medal of Honor for putting out a fire in a magazine on Missouri.

Monssen was laid down 1 June 1943 by the Bethlehem Shipbuilding Corporation's Bethlehem Mariners Harbor, Staten Island, New York; launched 30 October 1943; sponsored by Mrs. Mons Monssen; and commissioned 14 February 1944.

== World War II ==
=== Central Pacific campaigns ===
Following shakedown off Bermuda, Monssen steamed north to Boston, Massachusetts, to join the new cruisers Vincennes, Houston, and Miami and escort them to San Diego. From San Diego, she screened Carrier Division 26 (CarDiv 26) to Pearl Harbor, arriving 8 May for rehearsals for the Marianas campaign. On 30 May, the destroyer sailed with Task Group 52.16 (TG 52.16) for Eniwetok, whence she continued on to Saipan, arriving on 15 June. By dawn, she had commenced preparatory firing against Japanese positions on Green Beach 1. Close fire support was started with the initial landings on Saipan and kept up, almost continuously, until noon, 17 June. Included in her accomplishments during that period was her assistance in the breaking up of a large-scale enemy tank and troop counterattack, south of Garapan, at dawn on the 16th.

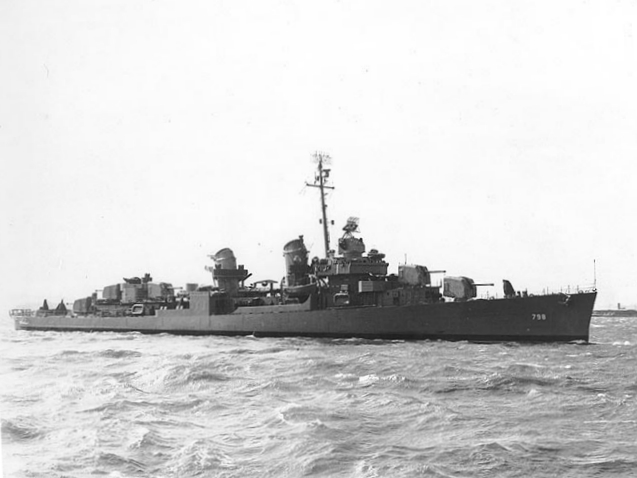
Monssen in 1944.

Late on the 17th, Monssen departed Saipan and rendezvoused with the Fast Carrier Task Force (then 5th Fleet's TF 58, later 3rd Fleet's TF 38) west of Guam as reinforcements for the approaching engagement with the Imperial Japanese Navy which would later be known as the Battle of the Philippine Sea. Assigned to TG 58.7 (fast battleships), Monssen took up station on the radar picket line and waited. Action began on the 19th when the group came under continuous attack from enemy carrier aircraft. During the day, the destroyer splashed two Yokosuka D4Y "Judy"s and damaged a third. On the 20th, American aircraft staged a long range attack on the Japanese fleet and that night Monssen's searchlights were turned on to aid the planes back to their ships and locate and rescue downed crews. The Force then pursued the retiring enemy until turning back toward Saipan at dusk on the 21st. Monssen resumed her duties of transport screen, radar picket, and fire support ship. On 2 July, she steamed to Eniwetok for a brief repair and replenishment period. Returning to Saipan, 12 July, she was employed in screening duties until the 23d, when she joined other assigned vessels in the bombardment of Tinian.

On the 24th, she screened transports as they conducted demonstration landings off Tinian Town and then provided fire support for the troops on the beachhead, continuing such support through the 31st. She remained in the Tinian area until 6 August, and then conducted antisubmarine patrols to the north of Saipan before turning back once again to Eniwetok.

From Eniwetok, Monssen steamed, with TG 32.41 to Guadalcanal, where the Palau offensive was rehearsed. On 8 September, assigned to screen and provide fire support for TG 32.4, she headed west. On the 15th and 16th, she stood off Peleliu, shifting to Angaur on the 17th and remaining in the screen of that transport area until the 23d. On the 24th, she got underway for Manus Island, whence she departed 11 October for Leyte Gulf and her fifth amphibious landing.

=== Philippines campaign ===
In the screen of TG 79.11 (landing craft), Monssen arrived in Leyte Gulf and delivered her charges to the Dulag beaches on the 20th and then proceeded to take up her screening station, with Destroyer Squadron 54 (DesRon 54), across Surigao Strait. Through the 24th, the squadron encountered only sporadic air attacks. In the early morning of the 25th, however, an enemy surface force attempted to force into the Leyte Gulf transportation area through Surigao Strait.

The 7th Fleet was waiting. The night before, Rear Admiral Jesse B. Oldendorf had deployed his forces for what was to be the last engagement of a battleline. ComDesRon 54, Capt. Jesse B. Coward, divided his ships into eastern and western attack groups to launch offensive torpedo attacks as the Japanese steamed up the strait. Monssen was assigned to the western group with McDermut and positioned close to the Leyte shore. Soon after midnight the Japanese Southern Force was reported entering the strait. Between 03:00 and 03:01, the eastern group commenced launching torpedoes, firing 27 in less than 2 minutes. At 03:10, McDermut and Monssen under the Command of Cdr. Charles Kniese Bergin, USN launched their attack. At 03:20, explosions flashed, with one of Monssen's "fish" scoring on the battleship Yamashiro, but not stopping her. After firing their torpedoes, Monssen and McDermut retired north, hugging the coastline of Leyte to avoid fire from the ships of DesRon 24 and DesRon 56 and those of the battleline.

At dawn, Monssen resumed her patrol station and the next day departed for Hollandia, whence she screened reinforcement convoys to Leyte during November. On 9 December, she headed for Bougainville, arriving on the 12th to escort TG 79.1 (transports) to New Guinea for rehearsals of the Luzon invasion. By 21 December, she was at Manus, whence she departed on the 30th to rendezvous with Task Unit 77.9.12 (TU 77.9.12) (landing craft of the reinforcement echelon) and proceeded to the northern Philippines. She arrived in Lingayen Gulf, 11 January 1945, 2 days after the initial assault. On the 12th, she received her first taste of Japanese suicide tactics when three kamikazes closed on her transport area. The destroyer took two under fire and assisted in exploding one 100 feet short of a merchant ship. The second crashed into Belknap.

=== Japan campaigns ===
On 13 January, Monssen departed Luzon, escorted empty transports to Leyte, and then proceeded on to Ulithi, where she joined TG 58.5, the fast carrier night group. The force sortied 10 February and set a course for the Japanese homeland. On the 16th and 17th, strikes were conducted on the Tokyo area to prevent reinforcements from being sent to aid the Imperial forces in the Bonin and Volcano Islands. By the 19th, they were off Iwo Jima, providing support for the American troops embattled there. Monssen remained in the Volcanos, screening the carriers and providing gunfire support for the land forces, until 9 March, when she returned to Ulithi. On 14 March, she again sortied with TF 58 for strikes on the enemy's home islands. On the 18th, the carriers sent their planes against Kyūshū and, on the 19th, against the Kure Naval Base, after which Monssen retired with the damaged Franklin.

Monssen resumed her position in the fast carrier force for further strikes on Japan on the 23d, followed by sweeps of the Ryūkyūs. For the next 7 weeks she served on radar picket stations and as plane guard as air operations were conducted in support of the Okinawa campaign. A week after the initial assault, she proceeded north to intercept a Japanese surface force headed south. During this engagement, carrier planes sank the super-battleship Yamato. On 11 May, Monssen retired to Ulithi for replenishment, returning to Okinawa on the 28th. After a week on picket station, she steamed north for fighter sweeps over Kyūshū, 2–3 June, then returned to Okinawa, whence she departed for further raids on Kyūshū, 8 June, and the bombardment of various northern Ryūkyū points.

From 13 to 30 June, Monssen enjoyed upkeep and replenishment at Leyte, departing 1 July for her final missions with TF 38. On the 10th, the force's planes flew against Tokyo; on the 13th, 14th, and 15th, against Hokkaidō and northern Honshū as battleships of the force bombarded Muroran, a steel center on Hokkaidō. On the 17th, 18th, and 19th, Tokyo was again the target of the planes, while the surface ships, including Monssen, shelled the Hitachi Armament Works, 70 miles to the north. On the 25th and 28th, the Inland Sea area was the recipient of America's wartime industrial produce.

Rearmed at sea, the force returned to Tokyo on 9 August and on the 10th, Monssen and the other ships of DesRon 54, were detached with orders to proceed to the west coast for overhaul. Heading north, the squadron joined TF 92 for an antishipping sweep of the northern Kuriles and the bombardment of Paramushiro, 11th, and then continued on to Adak, Alaska.

At Adak, on the 14th, Monssen received word of the Japanese surrender, and new orders to return to Japan with TF 92 for occupation duty in the Ominato Naval Base area. A month later she sailed for Pearl Harbor, arriving on the 24th and continuing on the next day to San Francisco. There she received orders to continue to San Diego where she joined the Pacific Reserve Fleet, decommissioning 30 April 1946.

== 1951–1963 ==
Monssen recommissioned 31 October 1951 and reported, in March 1952, for duty with the Atlantic Fleet. Homeported at Newport, R.I., as a unit of DesRon 34, she added strength to the 2d Fleet as that fleet sent destroyers to the Far East to support United Nations forces in Korea. On 3 May 1954, she herself departed for deployment with the 7th Fleet. Transiting the Panama Canal, she arrived in the western Pacific 7 June and for the next 4 months patrolled off Korea and in the Taiwan Straits and conducted exercises in Japanese and Okinawan waters. On 5 October she departed Japan and continued her cruise, returning to Newport, via the Suez Canal, in time for Christmas.

For the next 3 years, Monssen cruised off the east coast and in the Caribbean, deploying early in 1956 for operations with the 6th Fleet. According to the Dictionary of American Naval Fighting Ships, in September 1957, she again decommissioned; this time berthing at Boston as a unit of the Atlantic Reserve Fleet. However, the Naval Vessel Register lists the decommissioning date as 3 December 1957.

Transferred to the Philadelphia Reserve Group in 1962, Monssen was being towed down the coast when the towline parted in heavy seas due to the Ash Wednesday Storm of 1962. With seas running 10 to 15 feet and wind gusting to 50 knots, she went aground on 6 March at Beach Haven Inlet, New Jersey, remaining there for 6 weeks before being pulled off and completing her journey. Declared unnecessary to the defense of the United States, Monssen was sold, 21 October 1963, to the Union Minerals & Alloys Corp., New York, New York, for scrapping.

Monssen received eight battle stars for World War II service.
