= USS Vicksburg (CL-86) =

Light cruiser of the United States Navy

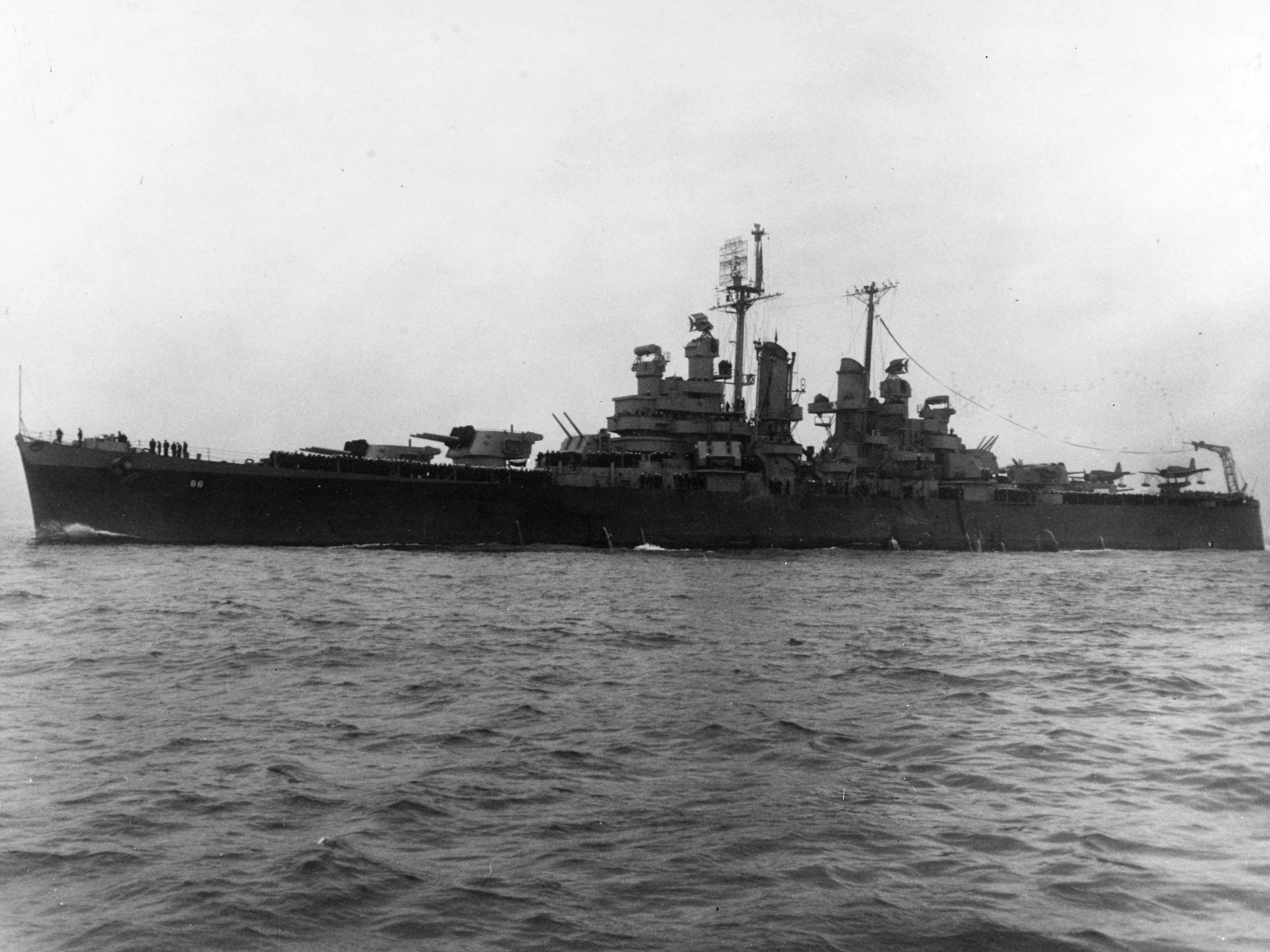
- USS Vicksburg soon after the end of World War II

History

United States
- Name: Vicksburg
- Namesake: City of Vicksburg, Mississippi
- Builder: Newport News Shipbuilding & Dry Dock Company, Newport News, Virginia
- Laid down: 26 October 1942
- Launched: 14 December 1943
- Commissioned: 12 June 1944
- Decommissioned: 30 June 1947
- Stricken: 1 October 1962
- Fate: Sold for scrap on 25 August 1964

General characteristics
- Class & type: Cleveland-class light cruiser
- Displacement: Standard: 11,744 long tons (11,932 t); Full load: 14,131 long tons (14,358 t)
- Length: 610 ft 1 in (185.95 m)
- Beam: 66 ft 4 in (20.22 m)
- Draft: 24 ft 6 in (7.47 m)
- Installed power: 4 × Babcock & Wilcox boilers; 100,000 shp (75,000 kW)
- Propulsion: 4 × steam turbines; 4 × screw propellers
- Speed: 32.5 knots (60.2 km/h; 37.4 mph)
- Range: 11,000 nmi (20,000 km; 13,000 mi) at 15 kn (28 km/h; 17 mph)
- Complement: 1,285 officers and enlisted
- Armament: 12 × 6 in (152 mm) Mark 16 guns; 12 × 5 in (127 mm)/38 caliber guns; 28 × 40 mm (1.6 in) Bofors anti-aircraft guns; 10 × 20 mm (0.79 in) Oerlikon anti-aircraft guns
- Armor: Belt: 3.5–5 in (89–127 mm); Deck: 2 in (51 mm); Barbettes: 6 in (152 mm); Turrets: 6 in (152 mm); Conning Tower: 5 in (127 mm)
- Aircraft carried: 4 × floatplanes
- Aviation facilities: 2 × stern catapults

USS Vicksburg (hull number: CL-86) was a Cleveland-class light cruiser of the United States Navy, which were built during World War II. The class was designed as a development of the earlier Brooklyn-class cruisers, the size of which had been limited by the First London Naval Treaty. The start of the war led to the dissolution of the treaty system, but the dramatic need for new vessels precluded a new design, so the Clevelands used the same hull as their predecessors, but were significantly heavier. The Clevelands carried a main battery of twelve 6-inch (152 mm) guns in four three-gun turrets, along with a secondary armament of twelve 5 in (127 mm) dual-purpose guns. They had a top speed of 32.5 knots (60.2 km/h; 37.4 mph).

Vicksburg was first laid down as Cheyenne on 26 October 1942 at Newport News Shipbuilding & Dry Dock Company, Newport News, Virginia, but, exactly one month later, was renamed Vicksburg. The light cruiser was launched on 14 December 1943; sponsored by Miss Muriel Hamilton, the daughter of Mayor J. C. Hamilton, of Vicksburg, Mississippi; and commissioned at the Norfolk Navy Yard on 12 June 1944, with Captain William C. Vose in command. Vicksburg received two battle stars for her World War II service.

== Design ==
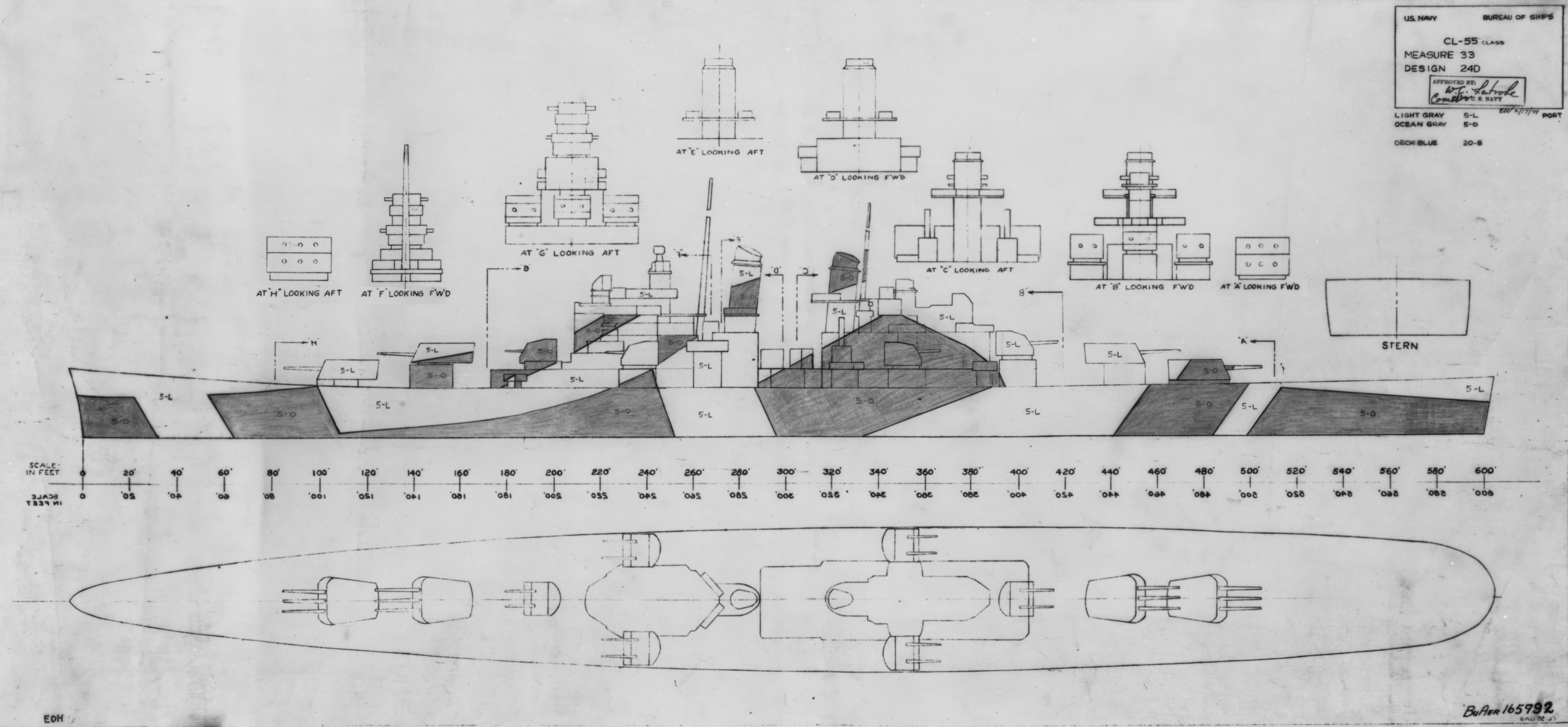
Depiction of the Cleveland class, showing the plan and profile

The Cleveland-class light cruisers traced their origin to design work done in the late 1930s; at the time, light cruiser displacement was limited to 8,000 long tons (8,100 t) by the Second London Naval Treaty. Following the start of World War II in September 1939, Britain announced it would suspend the treaty for the duration of the conflict, a decision the US Navy quickly followed. Though still neutral, the United States recognized that war was likely and the urgent need for additional ships ruled out an entirely new design, so the Clevelands were a close development of the earlier Brooklyn-class cruisers, the chief difference being the substitution of a two-gun 5 in (127 mm) dual-purpose gun mount for one of the main battery 6 in (152 mm) gun turrets.

Vicksburg was 610 feet 1 inch (186 m) long overall and had a beam of 66 ft 4 in (20.22 m) and a draft of 24 ft 6 in (7.47 m). Her standard displacement amounted to 11,744 long tons (11,932 t) and increased to 14,131 long tons (14,358 t) at full load. The ship was powered by four General Electric steam turbines, each driving one propeller shaft, using steam provided by four oil-fired Babcock & Wilcox boilers. Rated at 100,000 shaft horsepower (75,000 kW), the turbines were intended to give a top speed of 32.5 knots (60.2 km/h; 37.4 mph). Her crew numbered 1285 officers and enlisted men.

The ship was armed with a main battery of twelve 6 in /47-caliber Mark 16 guns (Note: /47 refers to the length of the gun in terms of calibers. A /47 gun is 47 times long as it is in bore diameter.) in four 3-gun turrets on the centerline. Two were placed forward in a superfiring pair; the other two turrets were placed aft of the superstructure in another superfiring pair. The secondary battery consisted of twelve 5 in (127 mm) /38-caliber dual-purpose guns mounted in twin turrets. Two of these were placed on the centerline, one directly behind the forward main turrets and the other just forward of the aft turrets. Two more were placed abreast of the conning tower and the other pair on either side of the aft superstructure. Anti-aircraft defense consisted of twenty-eight Bofors 40 mm (1.6 in) guns in four quadruple and six double mounts and ten Oerlikon 20 mm (0.79 in) guns in single mounts.

The ship's belt armor ranged in thickness from 3.5 to 5 in (89 to 127 mm), with the thicker section amidships where it protected the ammunition magazines and propulsion machinery spaces. Her deck armor was 2 in (51 mm) thick. The main battery turrets were protected with 6.5 in (170 mm) faces and 3 in (76 mm) sides and tops, and they were supported by barbettes 6 inches thick. Vicksburg's conning tower had 5-inch sides.

== Service history ==
=== Construction and initial service ===
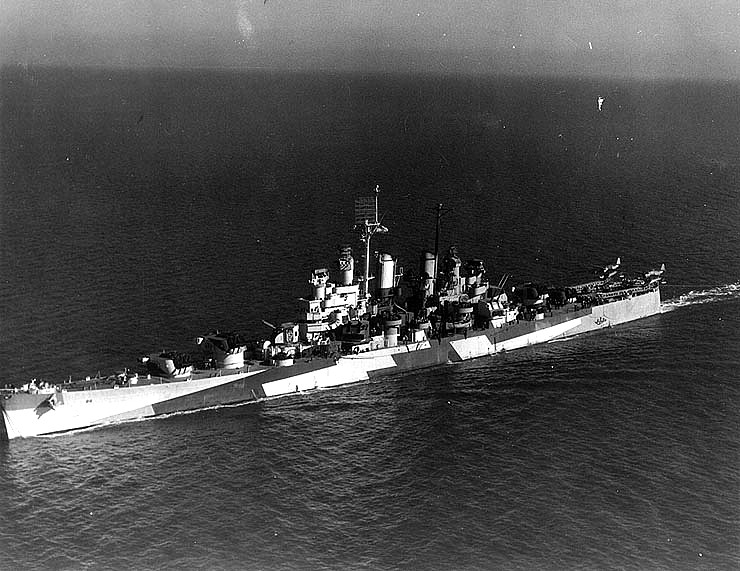
Vicksburg underway off the East Coast of the United States early in her career

Vicksburg was built by the Newport News Shipbuilding & Dry Dock Company of Newport News, Virginia. She was laid down on 26 October 1942, originally under the name Cheyenne, but was launched as Vicksburg on 14 December 1943 with the hull number CL-86. The ship's name was changed after one of her sisters, which had initially been given the name Vicksburg, was renamed Houston to commemorate the heavy cruiser of the same name that had been sunk at the Battle of Sunda Strait in 1942. After completing fitting-out work, Vicksburg was commissioned on 12 June 1944. Work to prepare the ship to go to sea lasted into July, when she began her initial sea trials in Chesapeake Bay. On 7 August, she got underway for her shakedown cruise that took the ship as far south as the British West Indies and included training operations in the Gulf of Paria from 12 to 30 August. During this period, she was based in Trinidad. She also conducted shooting practice at the target range off Culebra, Puerto Rico, before departing to return to the United States, escorted by the destroyers Broome and Simpson.

Vicksburg arrived in Hampton Roads, Virginia, where she participated in radar training on 9 September to familiarize her radar operators with identifying and tracking aerial and surface contacts. The next day, she conducted shooting practice with a drone off Cape May. On 11 September, she entered the dry dock at the Boston Navy Yard for an overhaul that lasted until 24 September. She thereafter took part in further trials held off Rockland, Maine, and radiation tests in Boston. From 5 October to 15 December, Vicksburg served as a training ship for crews of large warships that were awaiting commissioning. During this period, she operated in Narragansett Bay, Block Island Sound, and Long Island Sound. The ship thereafter sailed south to Norfolk for periodic maintenance at the Norfolk Navy Yard, arriving there on 17 December. She conducted a set of trials on 30–31 December, before departing on 1 January 1945, bound for the Pacific. She sailed in company with the destroyers USS Rodman and Emmons; the three ships were designated Task Group (TG) 21.12. They passed through the Panama Canal on 5 January and docked at Balboa, Panama, at on the other end of the canal. There, TG 21.12 was disbanded. Vicksburg sailed for Pearl Harbor the next day and arrived there on 17 January; there, she took part in combat practice that included air defense training that consisted of drone target practice, radar detection, and coordination with defending fighter aircraft.

=== Pacific Theater operations ===
==== Battle of Iwo Jima ====
On 5 February, Vicksburg got underway, bound for Saipan in the Mariana Islands, which she reached eight days later. While there, she refueled from the oiler Enoree as the fleet made preparations for the upcoming invasion of Iwo Jima. Vicksburg was assigned to TG 52.19, which sortied on 14 February. The next day, Vicksburg was transferred to Task Unit 54.9.2., part of the shore bombardment unit. It included the old dreadnought battleships Nevada and Idaho, the heavy cruisers Chester and Pensacola, and several destroyers. Vicksburg, Chester, and Pensacola took up their positions at 06:51 the next morning, and at 07:09, Vicksburg launched one of her Vought OS2U Kingfisher seaplanes to help direct her fire. Firing at a range of about 12,000 yd (11,000 m), the ship took Japanese positions on the north side of Iwo Jima under fire. Poor weather hampered the aircrews' ability to observe the ship's fire, but Vicksburg nevertheless carried out the bombardment for almost an hour, ceasing fire at 08:08.

After recovering and refueling her Kingfisher, Vicksburg resumed her bombardment at 09:47, but low visibility still interfered. During a third bombardment later that day, the heavy cloud cover dissipated and permitted much more effective shooting. During this period, at 14:14, a Japanese A6M5 Zero attacked Vicksburg's spotter, but another Kingfisher from Pensacola shot the Japanese fighter down, allowing Vicksburg's aircraft to continue supporting the cruiser. At around 14:45, the ship ceased fire again and recovered her Kingfisher. A fourth and final bombardment mission began at 16:18 and concluded at 17:27. Vicksburg and the rest of TG 52.19 departed for the evening. The ships continued to operate off Iwo Jima more than two weeks, providing fire support to the marines fighting to occupy the island. Later that month, Vicksburg was detached to form Task Unit 58.1.22 along with her sister ships Miami and Vincennes, the cruiser San Diego, and fifteen destroyers. The unit carried out a raid on the island of Okidaitōjima on 2 March. the On 5 March, Vicksburg left for the fleet's base at Ulithi to replenish ammunition and stores. While there, she was transferred to Task Force 58, the fast carrier task force, and was assigned to TG 58.1, one of the subordinate carrier battle groups. The task force sortied on 14 March to carry out air strikes in preparation for the upcoming invasion of Okinawa.

==== Okinawa campaign and end of the war ====
In the early hours of 18 March, as the carriers began their attacks on Japanese positions in the home islands, a Japanese Mitsubishi G4M1 bomber attempted a torpedo attack on Vicksburg. The cruiser turned away, narrowly avoiding the torpedo by around 35 yd (32 m). Another Japanese aircraft dropped flares nearby about twenty minutes later before being driven off by anti-aircraft fire from the American fleet; shortly thereafter, it passed back through the American formation and was shot down by the combined fire of several ships, including Vicksburg. Further Japanese attacks took place through the morning. A Yokosuka P1Y land-based bomber attempted to dive on one of the carriers, but was shot down by heavy American fire. Some two hours later, a Yokosuka D4Y dive bomber flew over Vicksburg; the cruisers' light gunners scored three hits before the aircraft was shot down by 5-inch fire from other vessels—potentially Miami or the destroyer Harrison—brought the aircraft down. Over the following days, the American carriers struck many targets in Japan, prompting heavy Japanese counter-attacks. During this period, Vicksburg shot down a total of eight Japanese aircraft. She also used her Kingfisher to recover an American pilot who had been shot down off the Japanese coast.

When the invasion of Okinawa began on 1 April, Vicksburg returned to coastal bombardment duties. The ship supported the American advance across the southern half of the island, targeting defensive strongpoints, fortified caves, and other defensive positions. She fired thousands of rounds from her 6-inch and 5-inch batteries, at times engaging Japanese positions a few hundred yards from American positions. She nevertheless remained attached to TG 58.1 during the campaign. In the final stage of the fighting on Okinawa, Vicksburg was detached to escort minesweepers clearing Japanese minefields in the East China Sea. These operations concluded on 24 June, and Vicksburg thereafter went to the Philippines. In mid-July, Vicksburg was assigned to TG 95.7, along with the old battleships Arkansas and Texas, two other cruisers, and several destroyers. The unit, part of TF 95, was used to patrol off Okinawa and make raids into the East China Sea to interdict Japanese shipping in the area, though Vicksburg saw no serious action during this period. In early August, Vicksburg joined the escort for the carriers Intrepid and Cabot, along with the cruiser Mobile and several destroyers, for a raid on Wake Island.

Vicksburg later returned to the Philippines, where she lay when the Japanese surrendered on 15 August. She then joined Task Unit 30.3.7, which also included the destroyers Moale, Rowe, and Lowry, which sortied on 20 August, bound for Japan. The ships rendezvoused with the fast carrier strike force, which had by then passed to 3rd Fleet command and been re-numbered TF 38, and on 24 August, Vicksburg was assigned to TG 38.2. The unit remained outside Tokyo Bay in late August and into September, where the formal surrender ceremony was carried out aboard the fast battleship Missouri on 2 September. Vicksburg and the rest of the task group then entered the bay on 5 September. The cruiser became the flagship of Cruiser Division 10, commanded by Rear Admiral Lloyd J. Wiltse. Vicksburg and other elements of TF 38 departed for Okinawa on 20 September, where the ship embarked some 2,200 passengers bound for the United States.

Over the course of the ship's participation in World War II, Vicksburg earned two battle stars.

=== Post-War ===
Vicksburg and the other ships arrived in Hawaii on 4 October, remaining there for five days before departing for California. The ships arrived in San Francisco Bay, California, on 15 October, passing through a naval review as they entered the port. On 26 October, Vicksburg moved to Monterey Bay, California, for the Navy Day celebration the next day. She then sailed for Long Beach, California, where she remained from 31 October to 6 November, when she departed for Portland, Oregon. There, she took part in the Armistice Day celebration on 11 November. The ship then returned to Long Beach five days later, where she remained through the end of the year. On 17 January 1946, Vicksburg was drydocked at the Terminal Island Naval Shipyard in Long Beach, California, for a thorough overhaul and modernization. After returning to service, she became the flagship of Third Fleet, commanded by Vice Admiral (VAdm) Frederick C. Sherman. The ship moved to Naval Air Station San Diego, where Third Fleet was based. In September, VAdm Alfred E. Montgomery temporarily made Vicksburg his flagship. The cruiser was decommissioned on 30 June 1947 as part of the post-war reduction in fleet strength, and she was allocated to the reserve fleet for the next fifteen years. She was stricken from the naval register on 1 October 1962 and sold to the National Metal and Steel Corporation of Terminal Island, California, on 25 August 1964. There, she was broken up.
