= USS Circassian =

Cargo ship of the United States Navy

History

United States
- Acquired: 8 November 1862
- Commissioned: 12 December 1862
- Decommissioned: 26 April 1865
- Captured: by Union Navy forces; 4 May 1862
- Fate: Sold, 22 June 1865

General characteristics
- Displacement: 1,750 tons
- Length: 241 ft (73 m)
- Beam: 39 ft (12 m)
- Draft: 18 ft (5.5 m)
- Propulsion: steam engine; screw-propelled
- Armament: 4 × 9 in (230 mm) smoothbore guns; 1 × 100-pounder rifle; 1 × 12-pounder rifle

USS Circassian was a large steamer captured by the Union Navy during the American Civil War.

She was used by the Union Navy as a supply ship for ships on the blockade of the ports and waterways of the Confederate States of America.

The ship was named after the Circassians.

== Service history ==
Circassian, an iron screw steamer, was captured 4 May 1862 by USS Somerset; purchased from the prize court at Key West, Florida, 8 November 1862; outfitted at New York Navy Yard; and commissioned 12 December 1862, Acting Volunteer Lieutenant W. B. Eaton in command. Circassian served as supply ship for the East and West Gulf Blockading Squadrons. Between 17 December 1862 and 11 April 1865 she completed nine cruises from New York City or Boston, Massachusetts, delivering supplies to ships and stations along the Atlantic coast and in the Gulf of Mexico as far west as Galveston, Texas, and up the Mississippi River to New Orleans, Louisiana. On return trips she carried men due to be discharged, invalids, prisoners of war, cotton and provisions.

During this time she also captured two prizes and participated in the search for the Confederate steamer Florida in July 1864. In the Gulf of Mexico off Sabine Pass on 3 September 1864, she picked up a boat carrying nine members of the crew of the U.S. steamer Gillum, which had been wrecked during a voyage from New Orleans to Matamoros, Mexico. Circassian arrived at Boston Navy Yard from her last cruise 11 April 1865, was placed out of commission 26 April 1865 and sold 22 June 1865.
