= Isonomia =

Equality of law

Isonomia also isonomy (ἰσονομία "equality of political rights," from the Greek ἴσος isos, "equal," and νόμος nomos, "usage, custom, law,") is a word that means equality before the law. It was a word used by ancient Greek writers such as Herodotus and Thucydides to refer to some kind of popular government. It was subsequently eclipsed until brought back into English as isonomy ("equality of law"). Economist Friedrich Hayek attempted to popularize the term in his book The Constitution of Liberty and argued that a better understanding of isonomy, as used by the Greeks, defines the term to mean "the equal application of the laws to all."

== Ancient usage ==
Mogens Herman Hansen has argued that, although often translated as "equality of law," isonomia was in fact something else. Along with isonomia, the Athenians used several terms for equality all compounds beginning with iso-: isegoria (equal right to address the political assemblies), isopsephos polis (one man one vote) and isokratia (equality of power).

When Herodotus invents a debate among the Persians over what sort of government they should have, he has Otanes speak in favor of isonomia when, based on his description of it, we might expect him to call the form of government he favors "democracy."

The rule of the people has the fairest name of all, equality (isonomia), and does none of the things that a monarch does. The lot determines offices, power is held accountable, and deliberation is conducted in public.

Thucydides used isonomia as an alternative to dynastic oligarchy and moderate aristocracy. In time the word ceased to refer to a particular political regime; Plato uses it to refer to simply equal rights and Aristotle does not use the word at all.

Ancient Greek philosophy linked to isonomía with isegoria (prior equality in determining principles of law) and isocratía (equality in subsequent governance or application of law)

== Medical usage ==
'Isonomia' was also used in Hellenic times by Pythagorean physicians, such as Alkmaeon, who used it to refer to the balance or equality of those opposite pairs of hot/cold, wet/dry and bitterness/sweetness that maintained the health of the body. Thus:

Alkmaeon said that the equality (isonomia) of the powers (wet, dry, cold, hot, bitter, sweet, etc.) maintains health, but that monarchy [one overruling] among them produces disease.

== Later use ==
According to economist and political theorist Friedrich Hayek, isonomia was championed by the Roman Cicero and "rediscovered" in the eleventh century AD by the law students of Bologna who he says are credited with founding much of the Western legal tradition.

Isonomia was imported into the English language from Italian at the end of the sixteenth century as a word meaning "equality of laws to all manner of persons". Soon after, it was used by the translator of Livy Philemon Holland in the form "Isonomy" - which term Livy himself did not use - to describe a state of equal laws for all and responsibility of the magistrates. During the seventeenth century it was gradually replaced by the phrases "equality before the law", "rule of law" and "government of law".

Political theorist Hannah Arendt argued that isonomy was equated with political freedom at least from the time of Herodotus. The word essentially denoted a state of no-rule, in which there was no distinction between rulers and ruled. It was "the equality of those who form a body of peers." Isonomy was unique among the forms of government in the ancient lexicon in that it lacked the suffixes "-archy" and "-cracy" which denote a notion of rule in words like "monarchy" and "democracy." Arendt goes on to argue that the Greek polis was therefore conceived not as a democracy but as an isonomy. "Democracy" was the term used by opponents of isonomy who claimed that "what you say is 'no-rule' is in fact only another kind of rulership...rule by the demos," or majority.

The public administration theorist, Alberto Guerreiro Ramos, reserved for isonomy a central role in his model of human organization. He was particularly concerned with distinguishing the space of the isonomy from that of the economy. Following Arendt, Guerreiro Ramos argued that individuals should have the opportunity to engage with others in settings that are unaffected by economizing considerations. The isonomy constitutes such a setting; its function is to "enhance the good life of the whole."

== See also ==
- Aristagoras
- Athenian democracy
- Classical Athens
- Cleisthenes
- Democracy
- Egalitarianism
- Equal justice under law
- Equality before the law
- Political egalitarianism
- Isocracy
- Anonymity (social choice)
- USS Isonomia (1864)
