= Isocracy =

Form of government where all citizens have equal political power

An isocracy is a form of government where all citizens have equal political power. The term derives from Greek ἴσος meaning "equal" and κρατεῖν meaning "to have power", or "to rule".

The first recorded use of the term was by the Reverend Sydney Smith in 1845, where opposition was expressed to the idea of equal rule for "all units of society"; Smith noted that the young should not have the same authority as the old and challenged isocrats to support voting and political rights for women, which was considered an extremist position at the time. An early recorded use of the word by a political organisation was by Grant Allen in the formation of the Independent Labour Party, arguing for equal rights for citizens. The history of the ILP incorporates liberalism, market socialism and co-operative societies:

"We believe in the strength and the rule of the people; in government of the People, by the People and for the People. Equality is the literal meaning of the word Isocracy"

As an incorporated association in Australia, the Isocracy Network Inc., has continued this tradition of libertarian and co-operative socialism as a member of the Alliance of the Libertarian Left.

Finally, the Greek Cypriot Chris Neophytou offers a more conservative perspective through isokratia which argues for an extension of liberal democracy with mass electronic voting.

== See also ==
- Anarchy
- Holacracy
- Demarchy
- Democracy
- Isonomy
