= USS Monssen =

USS Monssen may refer to:

- USS Monssen (DD-436), was a Gleaves-class destroyer that served from 1940 until sunk during the Naval Battle of Guadalcanal in 1942
- USS Monssen (DD-798), was a Fletcher-class destroyer that served from 1943 until 1957
