= Mons Monssen =

United States Navy Medal of Honor recipient (1867–1930)

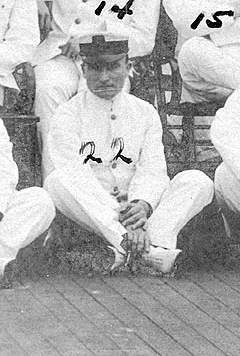
- Mons Monssen
- Born: January 20, 1867; Bergen, Norway
- Died: February 10, 1930 (aged 63); Brooklyn, New York, US
- Burial place: Cypress Hills National Cemetery
- Military career
- Allegiance: United States of America
- Branch: United States Navy
- Service years: 1889–1925
- Rank: Lieutenant
- Unit: USS Missouri (BB-11)
- Conflicts: World War I
- Awards: Medal of Honor

Mons Monssen (January 20, 1867 – February 10, 1930) was a Norwegian-American sailor in the United States Navy who received the Medal of Honor for heroism while serving about the USS Missouri (BB-11).

== Biography ==
Mons Monssen was born January 20, 1867 in Bergen, Norway, and enlisted in the United States Navy on June 3, 1889.

Monssen was a chief gunners mate serving on USS Missouri (BB-11) on April 13, 1904, when a charge ignited while a 12-inch gun was being loaded for target practice. Eighteen officers and men lost their lives. Monssen entered the burning magazine through the scuttle and threw water on the fire with his hands until a hose was passed to him. For his actions he received the Medal of Honor a month later.

Monssen was warranted as a gunner on May 27, 1904, and promoted to chief gunner on May 27, 1910.

He was commissioned lieutenant in July 1918 and he retired December 15, 1925.

He died at the Naval Hospital, Brooklyn, New York, February 10, 1930 and is buried at Cypress Hills National Cemetery.

== Medal of Honor citation ==
Rank and organization. Chief Gunner's Mate, U.S. Navy. Born: January 20, 1867, Norway. G.O. No.: 160, May 26, 1904.

Citation:

Serving on board the U.S.S. Missouri, for extraordinary heroism in entering a burning magazine through the scuttle and endeavoring to extinguish the fire by throwing water with his hands until a hose was passed to him, 13 April 1904.

== Namesake ==
See USS Monssen for the two ships named in his honor.

== See also ==
- List of Medal of Honor recipients during Peacetime
