= USS Isonomia =

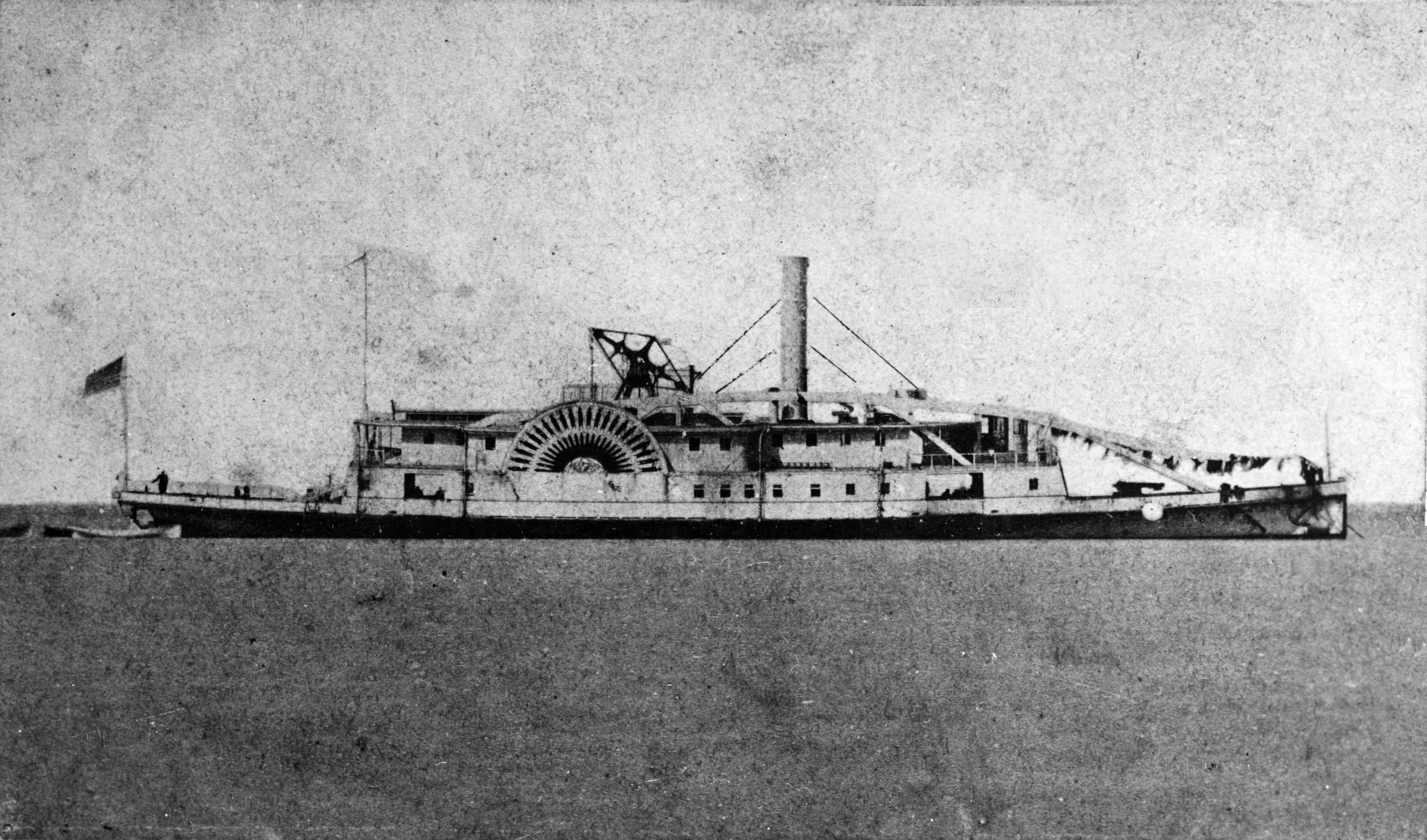
- USS Isonomia at anchor during the Civil War

History

United States
- Name: USS Isonomia
- Namesake: Isonomia
- Acquired: by purchase, 16 July 1864
- Commissioned: 16 August 1864
- Decommissioned: 28 June 1865
- Fate: Sold, 12 July 1865

General characteristics
- Type: Steam gunboat
- Tonnage: 593 GRT
- Length: 212 ft (65 m)
- Beam: 30 ft (9.1 m)
- Depth of hold: 9 ft (2.7 m)
- Propulsion: Steam engine
- Speed: 12 knots (22 km/h; 14 mph)
- Complement: 85 officers and men
- Armament: 1 × 3-pounder Parrott rifle; 2 × 24-pounder howitzers

USS Isonomia was a gunboat in the United States Navy during the American Civil War.

Originally built as a passenger steamboat intended for merchant service under the name Shamrock, the vessel was purchased at New York from Charles S. Leary on 16 July 1864. She was commissioned at New York Navy Yard on 16 August 1864.

== Service history ==
Isonomia sailed for Beaufort, North Carolina on 19 August and arrived there 23 August to join the North Atlantic Blockading Squadron. She served off New Inlet, North Carolina, until ordered to Key West on 18 September with special instructions to cruise in the vicinity of Nassau and the Bahama Banks. At Key West she was found unready for sea service and stationed at West Pass, Florida, where she operated until 15 November when she returned to Key West to prepare for cruising in Bahama waters. At the end of January 1865 Isonomia was returned to coastal blockade duty off western Florida and continued this duty until the end of the war. She captured the British bark George Douthwaite which attempted to slip into the Warrior River with a cargo of sugar, rum, wool, ginger, and mahogany from Jamaica.

Towing Somerset, she sailed for New York on 9 June 1865 where she was decommissioned 28 June 1865 and was sold at public auction to Tabor & Co. on 12 July 1865. Subsequently, she became the merchant steamer City of Providence, and was later sold to foreign interests in 1867.

As of 2007, no other ship of the US Navy has been named Isonomia.
