= USS Somerset (1862) =

Gunboat of the United States Navy

History

United States
- Name: USS Somerset
- Namesake: Somerset, Kentucky (scene of an early Union victory)
- Launched: 1862
- Acquired: by purchase, 4 March 1862
- Commissioned: 3 April 1862
- Decommissioned: 12 July 1865
- Fate: Sold, 12 July 1865; Served as a New York Ferry until 1914

General characteristics
- Type: Steam gunboat
- Displacement: 521 long tons (529 t)
- Length: 151 ft (46 m)
- Beam: 32 ft 4 in (9.86 m)
- Draft: 16 ft (4.9 m)
- Propulsion: Steam engine
- Speed: 10 knots (19 km/h; 12 mph)
- Complement: 110 officers and enlisted
- Armament: 2 × 9 in (230 mm) smoothbore guns; 4 × 32-pounder guns

USS Somerset was a wooden-hulled, side-wheel ferryboat built at Brooklyn, N.Y., in 1862, which was purchased by the Navy at Washington, D. C., on 4 March 1862 and was commissioned at the New York Navy Yard on 3 April 1862, Lt. Earl English in command.

== Service history ==
=== Cuba ===
Assigned to the East Gulf Blockading Squadron, the ferryboat arrived at Key West, Florida, on 27 April, and after cooling, sailed on 1 May for waters off the coast of Cuba to seek blockade runners. On 4 May, she captured screw steamer Circassian flying British colors between Havana and Matanzas about 10 miles off the Cuban coast. Lt. English placed a prize crew on the steamer and towed her to Key West for adjudication. There she was condemned and sold to the Navy. She was then refitted and commissioned as USS Circassian, serving until the end of the war in 1865.

=== Early War Service ===
After another cruise off the coast of Cuba, Somerset was ordered to cruise off Florida between Cedar Key and Apalachicola Bay. There she began a type of duty which characterized her service during her entire Navy career. In the next few months, she performed blockade duty; made a reconnaissance expedition to Way Key where she engaged Confederate Army troops on 15 May; shelled a Confederate fort near the lighthouse in St. Marks River, before landing a party of sailors who wrecked the battery on 15 June; captured blockade running schooner Curlew off the Cedar Keys the next day; and destroyed salt works at the end of the Fernandia Railroad at Depot Key on 4 and 6 October.

=== The Apalachicola River ===
Because of the shoal waters she patrolled, Somerset often sent boat parties to serve the Union cause in areas which she could not reach herself. On 27 December, one of her boats capsized in a squall, and three petty officers and one seaman were drowned during operations in St. George's Sound to seal off the Apalachicola River. Up this strategic stream, which held Somerset's attention for much of the next two and one-half years, the Confederates were building screw gunboat CSS Chattahoochee and ironclad CSS Muscogee.

These Confederate warships never got into action; but, in May 1864, a party of Confederate sailors from Chattahoochee, commanded by Lt. George W. Gift, attempted to capture Union side wheeler USS Adela which was blockading the Apalachicola. Launches from Somerset discovered the Confederate expedition, drove them off, and captured their boats and supplies.

=== Later service ===
Somerset spent most of the final year of the war guarding lest the Southern warships attempt to break the blockade. From time to time, an expedition to gain intelligence or a foray against Southern salt works would enliven her routine blockade duty. Her last excitement came in the closing weeks of the war when, on 30 March 1865, she joined Sunflower in destroying salt works on St. Joseph's Bayou.

== Decommissioned ==
After peace returned, the steamer - badly in need of repair and towed by USS Isonomia - headed for New York. She was sold at public auction there on 12 July 1865 to the Union Ferry Co.

Documented on 14 February 1866, the rejuvenated Somerset began a career as a New York ferryboat which lasted until she retired in 1914.

== See also ==
- Union Navy
