= Edward Simpson (governor) =

U.S. Navy officer (1860–1930)

Captain Edward Simpson Jr.
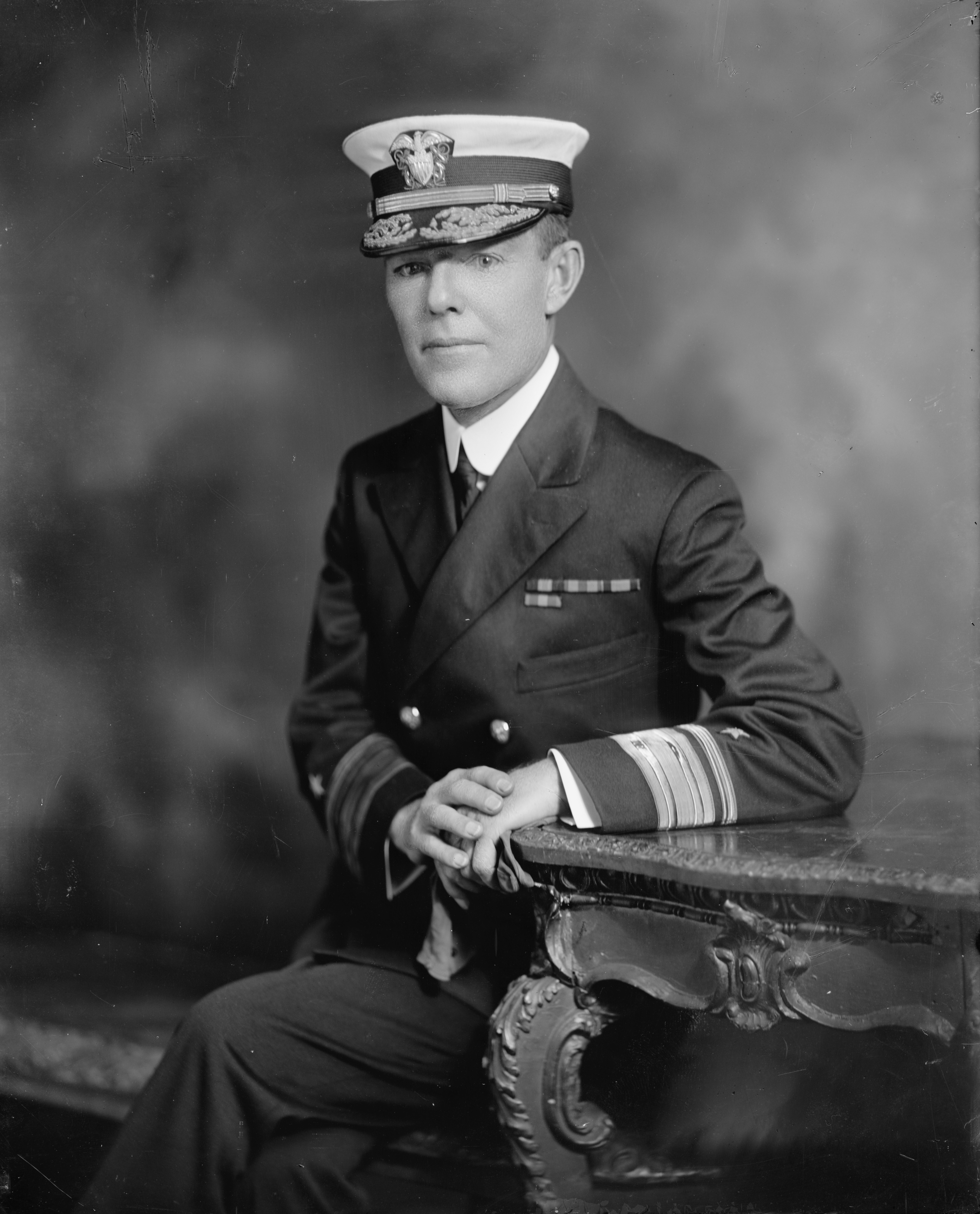

21st Naval Governor of Guam
- In office May 18, 1916 – May 30, 1916
- Preceded by: William P. Cronan
- Succeeded by: Roy Campbell Smith

Personal details
- Born: September 16, 1860 Annapolis, Maryland, U.S.
- Died: September 6, 1930 (aged 69) Ruxton, Maryland, U.S.

Military service
- Allegiance: United States
- Branch/service: United States Navy

Rear Admiral Edward Simpson Jr. (September 16, 1860 – September 6, 1930) was a United States Navy officer who briefly served as the acting 20th Naval Governor of Guam from May 8, 1916 to May 30, 1916. Simpson, commandant of the U.S. Naval Base Subic Bay and the U.S. Naval Station Sangley Point, took the position pending the arrival of appointed Governor Captain Roy Campbell Smith. Prior to his command, he served as a naval attaché to London in 1911.

He was born in Annapolis, Maryland, to Rear Admiral Edward Simpson Sr. He retired in 1924, and died in his Ruxton, Maryland, home.
