= USS Simpson (DD-221) =

Clemson-class destroyer

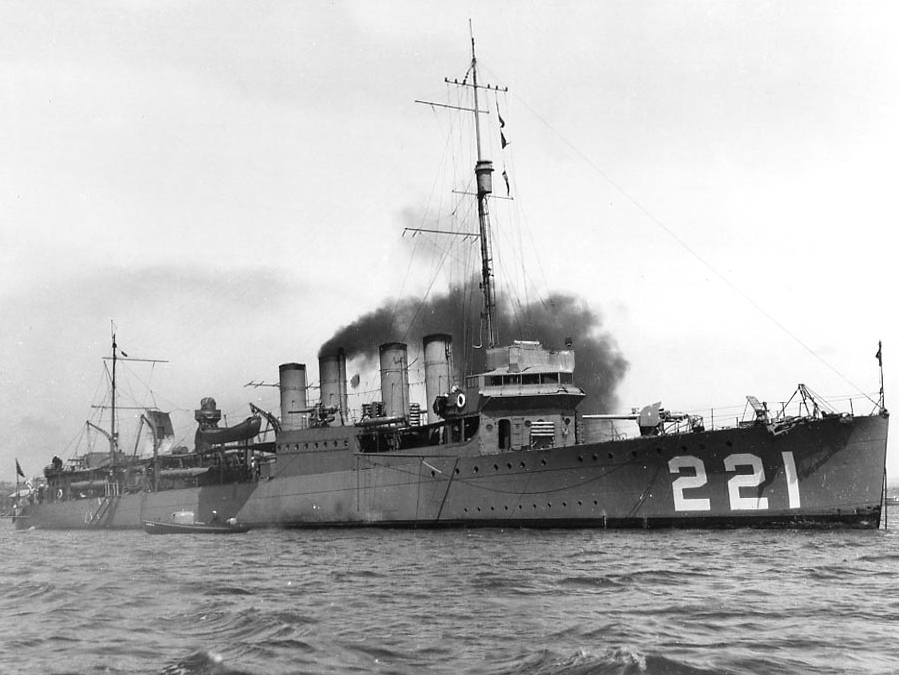
- USS Simpson (DD-221) anchored off San Diego, California, during the early 1920s.

History

United States
- Namesake: Edward Simpson
- Builder: William Cramp & Sons, Philadelphia
- Yard number: 487
- Laid down: 9 October 1919
- Launched: 28 April 1920
- Commissioned: 3 November 1920
- Reclassified: High-speed transport, APD-27, 1 December 1943 (cancelled); Miscellaneous auxiliary, AG-97, 23 May 1945
- Decommissioned: 29 March 1946
- Stricken: 19 June 1946
- Fate: Sold for scrap 21 November 1946

General characteristics
- Class & type: Clemson-class destroyer
- Displacement: 1,215 tons
- Length: 314 ft 4 1/2 in (95.82 m)
- Beam: 30 ft 11 1/2 in (9.436 m)
- Draft: 9 ft 4 in (2.84 m)
- Propulsion: 26,500 shp (20 MW); geared turbines, 2 screws
- Speed: 35 kn (65 km/h)
- Complement: 122 officers and enlisted
- Armament: 4 x 4 in (100 mm) guns, 1 x 3 in (76 mm) gun, 12 x 21 inch (533 mm) TT.

USS Simpson (DD-221/APD-27/AG-97) was a Clemson-class destroyer in the United States Navy during World War II. She was the first ship named for Rear Admiral Edward Simpson.

Simpson was laid down on 9 October 1919 by William Cramp & Sons; launched on 28 April 1920; sponsored by Miss Caroline Sterett Simpson, daughter of Rear Admiral Simpson; and commissioned on 3 November 1920.

== Service history ==
Simpson conducted training exercises with the Pacific Fleet during her first year of service, including a cruise to Valparaíso, Chile. She then transited the Panama Canal on 12 December 1921, and after overhaul at Philadelphia, she sailed from Newport, Rhode Island, for the Mediterranean on 6 June 1922. Between 29 June 1922 and 26 February 1924, Simpson served as a unit of the United States Naval Detachment in Turkish waters under Rear Admiral Mark L. Bristol, protecting American interests during the unrest in the Near East following World War I. Simpson was involved in protecting United States citizens, and aiding the work of the American Relief Association in the Black Sea and rescued mainly hundreds of Americans after the great fire of Smyrna on 13 September 1922. After a tour of ports in the western Mediterranean and the English Channel, Simpson departed Southampton, England, on 1 July 1924 for overhaul at Norfolk, Virginia. She then underwent training in the Caribbean and on the United States West Coast before crossing the Pacific for duty with the Asiatic Fleet.

Upon arrival at Chefoo, China, on 14 June 1925, Simpson entered the routine of the Asiatic Fleet, training at bases in Tsingtao and Chefoo in the summer and Manila in the winter, and visiting Chinese ports during the transit each way. During 1925, unrest in China increased, due to the growth in strength of the Kuomintang forces under Chiang Kai-shek and anti-foreign outbreaks at Shanghai and Canton. Destroyers were detached from the fleet to supplement the normal gunboat patrols on the Yangtze River and along the southern coast of China near Canton. Simpson rescued some missionaries at Deep Bay, China, on 2 and 3 July 1925, and during the next several years, carried out numerous patrols in Chinese waters protecting American lives and property. The destroyer was stationed at Nanking when Japan launched an air and sea attack on Shanghai at the end of January 1932, and she supported American diplomats in the southern Chinese capital during the critical early days of the crisis, as well as sending important reports to Washington. On 11 February, she moved to Shanghai and, on 23 February, to Swatow, where she remained until 2 April 1932. On 18 April, Simpson departed Manila with her squadron to return to the United States.

After overhaul at Mare Island, Simpson joined Destroyers, Battle Force, at San Diego, California on 28 September 1932 and conducted fleet exercises and training along the U.S. West Coast during the next several years. During night exercises in a fleet problem off Guantanamo Bay, Simpson collided with Milwaukee, on 7 May 1934, and she underwent repairs at the Philadelphia Navy Yard and summer training at Newport before returning to San Diego on 10 November. She then resumed training with the Pacific Fleet and participated in fleet maneuvers ("problems") annually in 1936, 1937, and 1938.

On 6 March 1939, Simpson transited the Panama Canal to the Atlantic, and between 5 June and 30 August 1939, she carried out three training cruises for Naval Academy midshipmen. She then commenced training cruises for Naval Reservists, but at the outbreak of war in Europe, she was assigned Neutrality Patrol duty and sailed for the Caribbean on 6 September. There she carried out patrols and participated in exercises, including a fleet landing exercise at Culebra from 14 February to 10 March 1940. After one training cruise for midshipmen and one for reservists during the summer, she resumed Neutrality Patrol duties in the Caribbean in October.

=== World War II ===
Simpson was part of a support force formed on 18 March 1941, after the signature of the Lend-Lease Act, to protect convoys between America and Britain in the North Atlantic. After several months of coastal escort and patrol duties, she escorted two convoys from NS Argentia, Newfoundland, to a rendezvous with British escorts off Greenland between 30 June and 3 September 1941. On 24 September, off Iceland, she joined the first westbound convoy to be escorted by American warships and delivered it safely to Argentia on 4 October. After United States entry into the war in December, her convoy trips were extended to the British Isles, and she remained on transatlantic convoy duty until 28 April 1942, when she entered the Boston Navy Yard for overhaul.

For nearly a year after leaving the yard in May 1942, Simpson escorted convoys up and down the United States East Coast. She made one trip to Casablanca in February 1943, and on 28 April 1943, began overhaul at the New York Navy Yard. At sea again in May, Simpson escorted a convoy from New York to Curaçao in the West Indies, and then made two round-trip voyages between Curaçao and Londonderry Port, Northern Ireland. On 29 August 1943, Simpson joined an escort carrier task group centered on Santee and escorted a convoy from Bermuda to Casablanca. The task group then carried out antisubmarine patrols off the Azores. The group joined a westbound convoy on 22 September but resumed antisubmarine sweeps after a submarine was reported near the Azores on 26 September. Simpson returned to the United States on 12 October but was back in the Azores conducting additional patrols between 28 October and 9 December 1943.

Simpson was designated on 1 December 1943 for conversion to a mode of fast transport, APD-27, but was replaced in January 1944 by George E. Badger, whose conversion was in turn cancelled. Resuming her convoy duties, Simpson escorted Antaeus for over three months from 29 December 1943 to 9 April 1944 as she carried troops up and down the U.S. East Coast. During the remainder of 1944 and early 1945, Simpson escorted new heavy combatant ships on shakedown and training exercises along the U.S. East Coast. Among the ships she served were battleships Wisconsin and Missouri, cruiser Alaska, and carriers Ticonderoga and Antietam.

== Convoys escorted ==
Convoy	Escort Group	Dates	Notes
ON 18		24 Sept-2 Oct 1941	from Iceland to Newfoundland prior to US declaration of war
HX 154		12-19 Oct 1941	from Newfoundland to Iceland prior to US declaration of war
ON 30		2-9 Nov 1941	from Iceland to Newfoundland prior to US declaration of war
HX 167		29 Dec 1941-7 Jan 1942	from Newfoundland to Iceland
ON 55		15-16 Jan 1942	from Iceland to Newfoundland
HX 175	MOEF group A4	15-25 Feb 1942	from Newfoundland to Northern Ireland
ON 73	MOEF group A4	6–16 March 1942	from Northern Ireland to Newfoundland
HX 182	MOEF group A4	30 March-7 April 1942	from Newfoundland to Northern Ireland
ON 86	MOEF group A4	14–26 April 1942	from Northern Ireland to Newfoundland
SC 111	MOEF group A3	1-16 Dec 1942	from Newfoundland to Northern Ireland
CU 2		21 May-5 June 1943	from Curacao to Liverpool
UC 3		10–26 June 1943	from Liverpool to Curacao
CU 3		11–24 July 1943	from Curacao to Firth of Clyde
UC 3A		30 July-10 Aug 1943	from Liverpool to Curacao

== Disposal ==
Simpson was reclassified a miscellaneous auxiliary, AG-97, effective 23 May 1945. All her armament was removed, and she was fitted with racks for exercise torpedoes and a winch for handling towed targets. She arrived at Guantanamo Bay, Cuba, on 16 June 1945 and provided training services there for nearly a year. On 11 May 1946, the veteran ship arrived at the Philadelphia Navy Yard for inactivation. Struck from the Navy list on 19 June 1946, Simpson was sold on 21 November 1946 to Northern Metals Company, Philadelphia, for scrapping.
