= Kim Tae-ho =

Kim Tae-ho may refer to:

- Kim Tae-ho (artist) (1948–2022), South Korean abstract painter
- Kim Tae-ho (boxer) (born 1952), South Korean boxer
- Kim Tae-ho (politician) (born 1962), prime minister-designate of South Korea
- Kim Tae-ho (television director) (born 1975), South Korean television director
- Kim Tae-ho (footballer) (born 1989), South Korean footballer
