= Paul Bloodgood =

American artist (1960–2018)

Paul Bloodgood (1960 – May 4, 2018) was an American artist and gallery owner who played an iconoclastic role in the New York art world for multiple decades. Bloodgood produced predominantly abstract paintings, often relating to the works of earlier artists from Jackson Pollock to Paul Cézanne. He co-founded the AC Project Room in Lower Manhattan and held solo exhibitions in several US cities, including New York, San Francisco, and Washington D.C., and at the Andreas Binder Gallery in Germany. His group exhibitions included shows at the Saatchi Gallery in London. He was a 2009 Guggenheim Fellow.

== Life ==
Paul Bloodgood was born in Nyack, New York, and awarded a BA in painting from Yale University in 1982. He moved to New York City in 1986 and received his MFA from Maine College of Art in 2002. He taught painting at Rutgers University, Cooper Union, and the Savannah College of Art, and was a recipient of multiple awards, including the John Simon Guggenheim Memorial Foundation Fellowship in 2009.

Michael Kimmelman wrote in The New York Times, "Mr. Bloodgood pushes things right to the edge, but not over it. The gestures are dizzying, yet not empty or simply derivative of the Abstract Expressionists whose art he inevitably evokes. There's a genuine and exuberant emotional quality here that suggests Mr. Bloodgood is someone to watch."

A 2012 Art in America review of his second solo show at the Newman Popiashvili Gallery described Objects in Pieces (2011) as having "a sense of being in the thick of things, a zooming in, as opposed to a deliberate fracturing and arranging. The accentuated density of elements and the intensity of this particular painting make it his most accessible and instantly gratifying canvas to date." It explained that Bloodgood had recently suffered a head injury, the result of a 2010 mugging, "leaving him with an optical disorder that prevents him from recognizing a whole object if he sees only parts of it... the artist has since changed his process and is relying on his impairment, rather than collages, to create his fragmentary abstractions."

"Standing in front of Bloodgood’s oils," it continued, "one is deeply impressed by the artist’s offbeat perspective and resolute pursuit of his own language."

From 1989 to 2001, Bloodgood operated AC Project Room, an independent, artist-run commercial gallery, initially on Renwick Avenue, later moving to Broome Street in SoHo, New York, along with Alissa Friedman and fellow artist Anne Chu. Together, they organized early, solo exhibits of many important artists' works, including: Louise Lawler, Matthew Ritchie, Isa Genzken, Fiona Banner, Kai Althoff, Verne Dawson, Doug Aitken, Kiki Smith, Jane & Louise Wilson, and Josiah McElheny.

For four years in the early 2000s he worked as a colorist, creating a range of paint colours for Martha Stewart and Lowe's Home Centers based on Paul Klee's color theories from his time at the Bauhaus.

Despite being diagnosed with early onset Alzhiemer's disease following the traumatic 2010 brain injury, Bloodgood continued working in his studio until 2017.

== Exhibitions ==
=== Solo exhibitions ===
- 2018 Paul Bloodgood, White Columns, New York, NY
- 2016 Paul Bloodgood, The Art Complex Museum, Duxbury, MA
- 2013 An Inch of Wholeness, Pei Ling Chan Gallery, Savannah, GA
- 2012 Objects in Pieces, Newman-Popiashvilli Gallery, New York; Paul Bloodgood, Susanna Hilberry Gallery, Detroit, MI
- 2010 Thing Language, Newman Popiashvili Gallery, New York, NY
- 1999 AC Project Room, New York, NY
- 1996 Rena Bransten Gallery, San Francisco, CA; Andreas Binder Gallery, Munich, Germany; Jack’s Name Painting, 303 Gallery, NY.
- 1995 Sandra Gering Gallery, NY; An Epic Poem on the History of Industrialization by R. Buckminster Fuller, Gavin Brown's Enterprise, NY; Baumgartner Gallery, Washington D.C.
- 1994 Baumgartner Gallery, Washington D.C.
- 1993 Paintings and House Poems, Sandra Gering Gallery, NY
- 1992 Margulies Taplin Gallery, Boca Raton, FL
- 1990 House Poems from Mab Library, Daniel Newburg Gallery Project Room, NY;
- 1990 Travels from the Notebook, AC Project Room, NY

=== Group exhibitions ===
- 2014 Abstract America Today, Saatchi Gallery, London
- 2013 Almanac, Newman Popiashvili Gallery, New York
- 2012 A painting show (in two parts) curated by Michelle Grabner, peregrineprogram, Chicago, IL; Loughelton Revisited, Winkleman Gallery, New York; Paint, Saatchi Gallery, London
- 2009 Paul Bloodgood, Anne Chu, Walter Keller Gallery, Zurich, Switzerland; At Close Range, Edward Thorp Gallery, New York
- 2008 Peace Among Topographers, Michel Auder and Paul Bloogood, Newman Popishvili Gallery, New York, NY and Susanne Hilberry Gallery, Ferndale, MI; Unrelated, curated by Matthew Higgs, Wilkinson Gallery, London Paul Bloodgood, Leonard Bullock, Greg Kwiatek, David Zwirner Gallery, NY
- 2007 Looking Back: The White Columns Annual, selected by Clarissa Dalrymple, White Columns, New York; Things From Your Life: An Exhibition in 3 Homes, curated by Kelly Adams and Paul Bloodgood, Jackson Heights, New York; In The Viewing Room, curated by Lisa Sigal, Frederieke Taylor Gallery, NY Jackson, curated by Barry Rosenberg, University of Connecticut Art Galleries, Stoors, CT
- 2000 Collaboration with Matthew Higgs, Matthew Higgs, Murray Guy, New York
- 1998 In The Beginning, Murray Guy, New York New Digs, AC Project Room, New York
- 1997 Paul Bloodgood/Marybeth Edelson, Art Resources Transfer, New York, NY; Shadows curated by Suzanne Joelson, E.S. Vandam; Paul Bloodgood, Paula Hayes, Josiah McElheny, Sandra Vallejos, AC Project Room, New York
- 1996 25th Anniversary, John Weber Gallery, New York; Drawings from the Mab Library, AC Project Room, New York
- 1995 Raw, Postmasters Gallery, New York; Material Abuse, Trans Hudson Gallery, Jersey City, NJ. Curated by Mark Harris
- 1994 Reveillon ‘94, Stux Gallery, New York; Sandra Gering Gallery, New York Shouts and Whispers, Venue, Philadelphia, PA
- 1993 Anxious Art, Bernard Toale Gallery, Boston, MA; Jours Tranquille à Clichy, Paolo Croyannes, Paris, France. Curated by Alain Kirili
- 1992 Bloodgood, Bullock, Cohen & Kinmont, Sandra Gering Gallery, New York.

In 1995 he worked on the Epilepsy Foundation's "Winning Kids" program, helping children with epilepsy create art.
