= Nick Doyle =

American artist (born 1983)

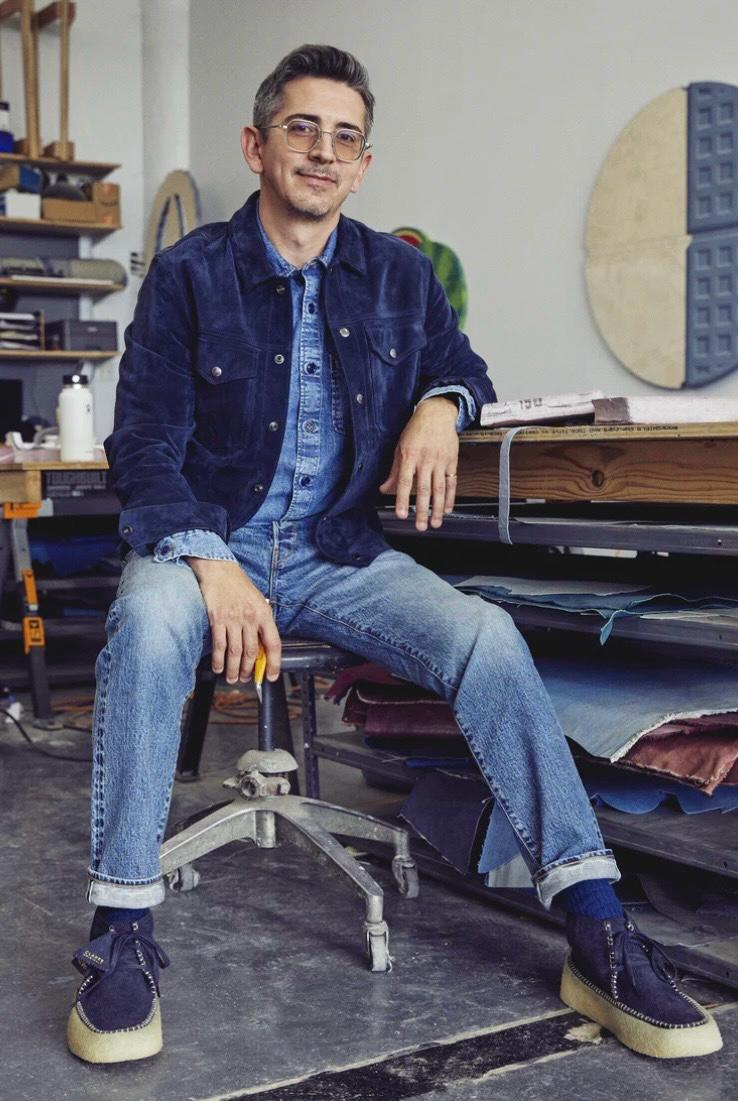
- Nick Doyle in his studio
- Born: 1983 (age 42–43); Los Angeles, California
- Education: MFA CUNY Hunter College, BFA San Francisco Art Institute
- Occupation: Artist

Nick Doyle (born 1983) is an American artist originally from Los Angeles, California and currently living and working in Brooklyn, New York. Known best for sculptural wall works made from collaged denim. His practice frequently engages with themes related to American identity and examines concepts such as greed, excess, and toxic masculinity.

== Early life and education ==
Doyle holds a Bachelor of Fine Arts (BFA) in Interdisciplinary Arts from the San Francisco Art Institute and a Master of Fine Arts (MFA) in Sculpture from CUNY Hunter College. In 2014, he attended the Skowhegan School of Painting and Sculpture. From 2014 to 2017, Doyle was a resident of the Lower Manhattan Cultural Council's Workspace program. In 2013, he was awarded the C12 Emerging Artist Fellowship upon completion of his MFA.

== Work ==
After seven years working in Tom Sachs's studio, Doyle transitioned to a full-time art career, presenting his first solo exhibition, "Everything Is Fine" at Galerie Perrotin in Seoul, Korea in 2021. His second exhibition with the gallery and his first ever in Paris was titled "Ruin" in 2022 which followed the same year another solo show this time at Galerie Perrotin New York.

== Themes ==
Doyle's artistic practice examines the relationship between media culture and the individual, frequently utilizing common materials, notably denim. His work has explored themes related to the American Dream, capitalism, and traditional masculine ideals. He has described denim as possessing a complex symbolism rooted in American history, encompassing associations with slavery, revolution, the American West, masculinity, and high fashion, which he sees as reflecting a history of internal conflict within the United States. His interest extends to Americana as a "production and a performance of American culture," including mid-century signage and architecture.

For instance, his "Executive Toys" series employs kinetic sculptures to explore "some of the shame and pressure involved with executive culture." In his exhibition titled Business, Pleasure, Pressure, Release at Galerie Perrotin Doyle addresses themes of "power dynamics, control mechanisms and hidden desires" in the context of the workplace. It featured an installation inspired from kink clubs.

== Publications ==
- Blue, Nick Doyle, Published by Galerie Perrotin, 2024, ISBN 9791091539432
