= Joyce Burstein =

American Contemporary artist (born 1966)

Joyce Burstein (born 1966) is an American Contemporary artist whose conceptual practice spans sculpture, installation art, public art, and social action. Her work often uses unconventional materials and interactive elements to explore themes of impermanence, selfhood, and existentialism. She lives in New York City.

== Early life and education ==
Burstein earned both her Bachelors of Fine Arts (BFA) and Master of Fine Arts (MFA) in 1984 from the San Francisco Art Institute (SFAI).

She subsequently relocated to New York, where she met and married Thomas McEvilley, an art critic, scholar, poet, and academic.

== Artistic practice ==
Joyce Burstein's art engages spectators as active participants by employing interactive objects and social projects, thereby bridging the divide between public monuments and individual experience. Her practice frequently operates as both sculpture and action, developing over time instead of existing solely as a completed, static object.

=== Work ===
A prominent example of Burstein's interactive public art is The Epitaph Project, permanently located at the Hollywood Forever Cemetery. It features a tombstone carved from slate resembling a chalkboard. Where the public is invited to inscribe their own epitaphs using chalk. Burstein reimagines the monument's historically rigid form as an ephemeral blank slate facilitating the exploration of themes such as life, death, and self-discovery.

The Flag of the Night Sky at the Minnesota Street Project, 2021

Burstein often works with found or discarded materials to create new meaning. In her ongoing project, The Flag of the Night Sky, she deconstructs American flags—specifically those that have been discarded and no longer in use, but are stockpiled at recycling centers due to desecration laws. She meticulously removes the white stars, then reassembles them into a monumental textile work representing the heavens, effectively "liberating" the symbols from their patriotic constraints, later installing them as existential markers in various locations.

Burstein's work is deeply rooted in long-term documentation and personal ritual. In Fingernail Drawings, she collects and arranges her own fingernail clippings with tweezers into delicate, skyline-like compositions—a practice she began over 40 years ago. Artist David Ireland, who also collected his own clippings, has notably supported this work.

== Awards ==
Burstein has received several grants and fellowships from institutions such as the Pollock-Krasner Foundation, the New York Foundation for the Arts (NYFA), Art Matters, the Institute of Noetic Sciences, the Adolph and Esther Gottlieb Foundation, and the Transart Experimental Workshop for Art and Anthropology.
