= Dove Bradshaw =

American artist (born 1949)

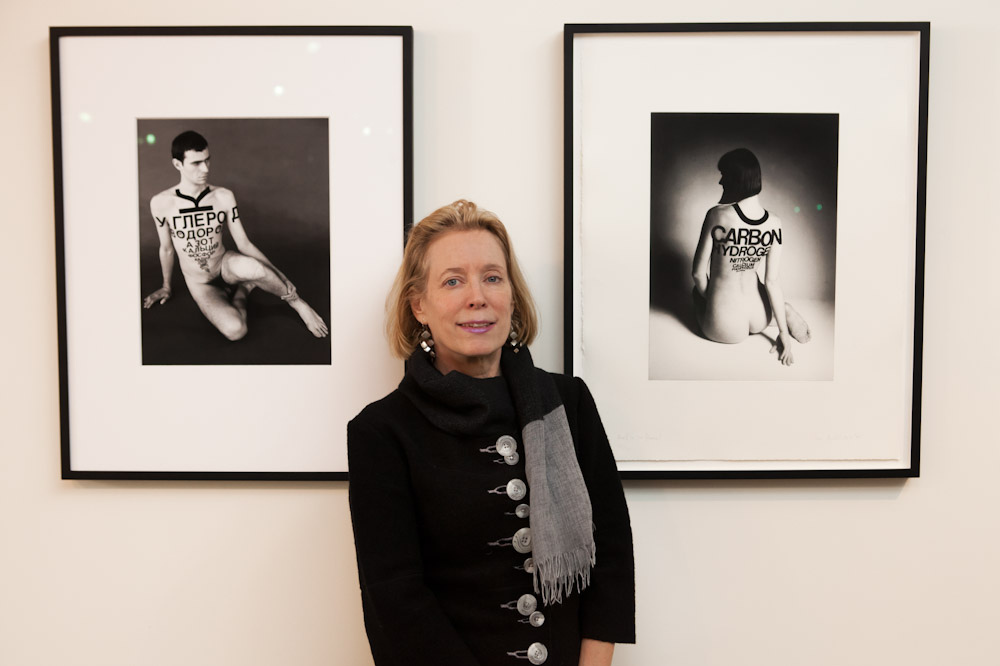
- Dove Bradshaw, 2011
- Born: September 24, 1949 (age 77); New York City
- Education: The School of the Museum of Fine Arts, Boston / Tufts University, BFA and Fifth Year Competition; Boston University
- Known for: Sculpture, installation, photography, performance, video and film

Dove Bradshaw (born September 24, 1949) is an American artist whose work integrates natural processes and environmental factors. She is known for chemical paintings, erosion sculptures, and the use of crystals to capture radio transmissions.

Her notable mid-career exhibitions include:

- 1984 Syracuse University, Utica, New York;
- 1998, the Museum of Contemporary Art, Los Angeles;
- 2003, City University of New York, with the publication of The Art of Dove Bradshaw, Nature, Change and Indeterminacy, text by Thomas McEvilley; and featuring a conversation with John Cage about Dove Bradshaw's work.
- 2008, the "Time Matters" catalogue exhibition took place at the Pierre Menard Gallery in Cambridge, Massachusetts, alongside a catalog publication.

Bradshaw's work has gained recognition by being included in the permanent collections of various prestigious institutions, including the Museum of Modern Art, the Metropolitan Museum of Art, the National Gallery in the United States, the British Museum in Europe, and the Russian State Museum (Marble Palace) in Russia. She regularly participates in international exhibitions and has notably contributed to events such as the Gwangju Biennale in South Korea. She has also held solo exhibitions, including one in Tokyo.

== Education and residencies ==
Dove Bradshaw was born in New York City. She graduated from the College of General Studies, Boston University, and received a BFA from the Boston Museum School of Fine Arts/Tufts University.

She has had residencies at:

2011	Niels Borch Jensen, Printmaker, Copenhagen
2008	Niels Borch Jensen, Printmaker, Copenhagen
2007	The Spirit of Discovery 1 and 2 in Trancoso, Portugal Pont-Aven School of Contemporary Art, France (teaching and resident artist)
2006	The Spirit of Discovery 1 and 2 in Trancoso, Portugal
2005	Niels Borch Jensen, Printmaker, Copenhagen
2003	Palazzo Durini, Bolognano, Italy
2000–2001	Niels Borch Jensen, Printmaker, Copenhagen Statens Vaerksteder for Kunst and Handvaerark, Gammel Dok, Copenhagen, in conjunction with exhibitions: Elements, Stalke Gallery, Copenhagen, and Anastasi Bradshaw Cage at the Museum of Contemporary Art, Roskilde, Denmark
2000	The Sirius Art Center, Cobh, Ireland, inaugurated outdoor sculpture court with placement of Notation II
1995	The Pier Arts Centre, Orkney, Scotland. Accompanying the exhibition were Contingency, Passion, 1993 and Indeterminacy, 1995 – situated in the permanent collection in the Pier Sculpture Court

== Indeterminacy ==
Inspiration from the work of composer John Cage, Bradshaw’s work explores the interaction between natural forces and artistic materials, often incorporating elements of chance. Her 1969 installation Plein Air involved bicycle wheels and floor-mounted targets in a setting that included mourning doves.

Her practice utilizes materials that are sensitive to environmental factors, such as weather and atmospheric changes. These include salt, stone, acetone, mercury, and sulfur, which undergo gradual transformations through natural processes like erosion and chemical reactions.

In 1976, Bradshaw placed a wall label beside a fire hose at the Metropolitan Museum of Art as part of a work titled Performance. The museum later issued an official postcard related to the piece, and the label was added to the museum’s permanent collection in 2007.

Bradshaw has been associated with the Process and Art/Science Movements, creating works such as Contingency Paintings that respond to atmospheric conditions and sculptures that document material transformations over time.

== Three retrospectives and public collections ==
An early survey, Works 1969–1984 was shown at Syracuse University, Utica, New York in 1984. Bradshaw has had three mid-career exhibitions: Dove Bradshaw 1988–1998 at the Museum of Contemporary Art, Los Angeles; Dove Bradshaw, Form formlessness, 1969–2003 at City University of New York; and Time Matters 1969–2008 at the Pierre Menard Gallery, Cambridge, Massachusetts. She is represented in the permanent collections of numerous museums in America and Europe, including one in Russia. She also regularly exhibits internationally.

== Exhibitions ==
Bradshaw was included in the Solomon R. Guggenheim Museum's American Artists Contemplate Asia, 1860–1989, a solo exhibition at Senzatitolo Associazione Culturale, Rome, inclusion in Elements at The Chemical Heritage Museum, Philadelphia for The Year of Chemistry 2011.

== Awards ==
- 1975: National Endowment of the Arts Award for Sculpture
- 1985: The Pollock-Krasner Award for Painting
- 1986: Designed the costumes for the Points In Space video that won the Prague d’Or the following year
- 1987: The Arts Grant for Merce Cunningham Dance (Design and Lighting)
- 2002: Furthermore Grant for The Art of Dove Bradshaw
- 2006: National Science Foundation Artists and Writers Grant.

== Curatorial work ==
She has curated four group exhibitions in memory of Sol LeWitt, ONE at Bjorn Ressle Gallery, New York, 2007, ONE More at the Esbjerg Art Museum, Esbjerg, Denmark, 2008 which was rebuilt for Thomas Rehbein Gallery, Cologne in January, 2009 and ONE, Six Americans/Six Danes Stalke Up North, Copenhagen, 2009. Anastasi, Bradshaw, Cage, Marioni, Rauschenberg, Tobey: Imitating Nature in her Manner of Operation, Sandra Gering Gallery, 1991; 8 Painters: 2005

Anastasi Bradshaw Cage Cunningham, curators: Marianne Bech and Dove Bradshaw, The University Art Museum, The University of California at San Diego; Anastasi Bradshaw Cage Cunningham, curators: Marianne Bech and Dove Bradshaw, The Bayly Museum, The University of Virginia, Charlottesville, Virginia; 2001; Anastasi, Bradshaw, Cage, curators: Marianna Bech and Dove Bradshaw, Museum of Contemporary Art, Roskilde, Denmark, Anastasi, Bradshaw, Cage, Marioni, Rauschenberg, Tobey, Sandra Gering Gallery, New York, 1990; 8 Painters:Jon Abbot, William Anastasi, Dove Bradshaw, Dana Gordon, Bruce Halpin, Carl Kielblock, Theodoros Stamos, Douglas Vogel, The Ericson Gallery, New York, 1981

== Works ==
=== Plein Air (1969) ===
Originally not conceived as art, this work began with a gift of a pair of Ring-necked Mourning doves and led to the design of their environment. The doves were given free rein of the artist's studio. A bicycle wheel was hung for a perch, with an adaptation of a Zen archer's target nailed to the floor below. The material trace of the work lay in photographs and 1969 bronze and silver casts of broken eggshells.

The first exhibition was at the Boston Museum School of Fine Arts in 1969. In 1989, it opened at the Sandra Gering Gallery in New York, and then it opened at the Mattress Factory Museum, Pittsburgh in 1990, and PS1 Contemporary Art Center, New York, in 1991. This was the artist's first sound sculpture—most apparent in the PS1 exhibition. Every day, after eating and preening, one of four birds flew to each corner room-support near the ceiling. Beginning with out-of-phase rounds they gradually came into sync after three-quarters of an hour, winding their song into a hypnotic crescendo nearing the hour. A pause followed, then softly they would start again, and repeated this pattern many times.

=== Contingency (1984) ===
The Contingency Series is Bradshaw's first significant body of two-dimensional work. Beginning in 1984, instead of paint she began using materials reactive to the environment.

Silver, which itself is subject to air, light and humidity, became the ground; liver of sulfur the chemical agent; and metal plates, wood, paper, linen, and the wall itself the various supports. The works range in size from a three and a half inch leaf on paper to paintings five feet in height and width. The appearance and composition of these works changes over time as reactions between the materials and environment occur.

The amount of chemicals used in each piece significantly affects the outcome. Black comes up faster if the solution is dense, yet if it pools, an ashy white appears, flaking at its edges. Fire seems to be the reference. With rain the works sweat—-drip lines become visible pouring from denser pools. Silver and sulfur, alchemical elements, are used because they are highly volatile.

As the artist explains, the process itself could be related to photography: the silver to the emulsion, the liver of sulfur to the developer. Although without using a fixer, the exposure is open-ended.

=== Guilty Marks (1990) ===
These paintings deal with themes of perishability and change. They consist of various chemicals, powdered pigments, ink, and varnish poured and dripped on the canvas. As a Danish reviewer wrote, “What the elements will do to one another only time will tell. The fusion between the materials is the essential – [like] the fusion between culture and nature. Bradshaw facilitates it, but after that, the work is out of her hands. It is nature that takes over."

=== Passion, Notation, Indeterminacy, Material/Immaterial: outdoor sculptures (beginning 1993) ===
After Bradshaw's environmentally reactive works which were the two-dimensional Contingency Series, she searched for a way to make sculptures that would be similarly reactive, but would also change shape.

The first work was a relief, a wall-embedded copper bar titled Passion. It was treated with acetic acid, which left a running stain down the wall. The first outdoor version (1995) was set in the exterior wall of the Pier Art Center, Stromness, Orkney, Scotland. The island atmosphere greatly assisted a natural bleed.

=== Notation (1993) ===
The Notation sculptures consist of copper or bronze cubes or prisms set on marble or limestone and left outdoors to weather. Smaller indoor versions were assisted with ammonium chloride copper sulfate to prompt a bleed.

=== Indeterminacy (1995) ===
The Indeterminacy Stones, begun in 1994, consisted of a chunk of pyrite, set atop a piece of marble, and then left outdoors to weather. The pyrite transformed into limonite when exposed to the elements, leaving a permanent iron rust stain. It may take less than ten years or over a century to dissolve depending on composition and environment. For the first exhibition of these works at Sandra Gering Gallery, New York, 1995, three boulders were gathered—one flat, one vertical, one wedge-shaped.

Ann Barclay Morgan, writing about work in Sculpture Magazine, commented “…the action of “bleeding”...could be seen as the female life-force in the process of being released. The transformation into the deep-colored limonite lends a sensuous quality to the marble....Bradshaw's use of Vermont marble [also] had intriguing implications. This material appears to embody a freeing from the confining notion of purity, emblematic of Carrara marble, toward the reality of life suggested by the veining of the marble itself, calling to mind the arteries of the human body that become more visible with age.”

=== Material/Immaterial (2000) ===
The Material/Immaterial Stones, made in Denmark, coupled local spring and aged calcstone and produced a white bleed on a dark stone.

=== Radio Rocks (1999) ===
Radio Rocks are made up of three different kinds of stones each piled into cairns that in Neolithic times were used as astronomical markers. Bradshaw's cairns, in addition to recalling their ancient use, focus on the aspect of sound by functioning as multi-directional antennas.

In each of these sculptures there are three radios designed to receive frequencies from three different zones. On top of one is a pyrite mixer designed to receive live emissions from Jupiter transmitted via a dedicated line from the radio telescope at Pisgah Astronomical Research Institute in Rosman, North Carolina. On one side, a galena mixer picked up a world-band short wave. On the other hand, a receiver developed by the satellite industry drew live microwaves identified as echoes of the Big Bang. The other two cairns featured fluorite, tourmaline and hematite, acting as non-linear mixers, were computer programmed to attract random local and world-band frequencies. The hematite mixer continuously channeled Weather Radio. Levels of all the radios were set at a murmur. The outer space sounds invoke celestial harmonies that from the quieter time of Pythagoras have been referred to as the “Music of the Spheres.”

=== Six Continents (2003) ===
Six Continents at the 6th Gwangju Biennale, Gwangju, South Korea, 2006 consists of six sculptures made from salt taken from each continent, funnels and water. The various salts, colored by minerals from each locale, react differently when subjected to water. Each sculpture is made of a 150-pound salt mound placed under a suspended funnel, each calibrated to release 7 drops per minute. The salt comes from:

- Antarctica: white salt from McMurdo Bay
- Africa: gray salt from Egypt
- Australia: brown salt from Western Australia
- Eurasia: ivory salt from Gwangju, South Korea
- North America: green salt from the Dominican Republic
- South America: pink salt from Chile

The work premiered at Larry Becker Contemporary Art, Philadelphia, 2005 and traveled to SolwayJones, Los Angeles later that year.

== Books/catalogues solo ==
- Multiples & Objects, Dove Bradshaw, Limited Edition Box of 10; “Artist's Books”, 2010
- Images, text by David Frankel, Limited Edition Box of 10; “Artist's Books”, 2010
- Zero Time, Zero Space, Infinite Heat, Angles, Quick Constructions, Limited Edition Box of 10, “Artist's Books”, 2010
- Contingency, Limited Edition Box of 10, artist text; “Artist's Books”, 2009
- Copper & Stone, Limited Edition Box of 10, artist text; “Artist's Books”, 2009
- Salt, Limited Edition Box of 10, artist text; “Artist's Books”, 2009
- Plain Air, Limited Edition Box of 10, artist text; “Artist's Books”, 2009
- Radio Rocks, Free Forum Natura, Baronessa Lucrezia Durini and Larry Becker Contemporary Art, Philadelphia, Limited Edition Box of 10; “Artist's Books”, 2008
- Time Matters, text by Charles Stuckey, Pierre Menard Gallery, Cambridge, Massachusetts, 2008
- Time & Material, text by Charles Stuckey, Senzatitolo Gallery, Rome, 2007
- Performance, texts by John Cage, Charles Stuckey, Battalion Commander Robert Schildhorn, Wilfredo Chiesa, Stuart Little, Carl Andre, Brian O’Doherty, Thomas McEvilley, James Putnam, Ray Johnson, Sol LeWitt, Ecke Bonk, Evelina Domnitch and Dmitry, David Ross, Marina Abramović, Nick Lawrence, Steve Berg, Antony Haden-Guest, Francis Nauman, Barry Schwabsky, William Anastasi, Robert Barry, Emanuel De Melo Pimenta, George Meyers, Jr., Dove Bradshaw, Timothy Bradshaw, Daniel Charles, Limited Edition of 10 “Artist's Books”, 2004
- ‘’The Art of Dove Bradshaw, Nature, Change and Indeterminacy’’, Thomas McEvilley; including republication of "John Cage and Thomas McEvilley: A Conversation, 1992", Mark Batty Publisher, West New York, NJ, 2003
- Anastasi Bradshaw Cage, Accompanying a three-person exhibition; "we are beginning to get nowhere” interview of William Anastasi and “Still Conversing with Cage” interview of Dove Bradshaw with Jacob Lillemose: Karl Aage Rasmussen, essay, The Museum of Contemporary Art, Roskilde, Denmark, 2001
- Dove Bradshaw / Jan Henle, Introduction by Julie Lazar, “Dove Bradshaw” by Mark Swed, afterword by Barbara Novak; “Jan Henle: Sculpture of No Thing” by Nancy Princenthal, The Museum of Contemporary Art, Los Angeles, 1998
- Dove Bradshaw: Inconsistency, Quotes by Tao Te Ching, Henry David Thoreau, John Cage, Franz Kafka selected by the artist, Sandra Gering Gallery, New York and Stalke Gallery, Copenhagen, 1998
- Dove Bradshaw; Indeterminacy, Anne Morgan, essay, Sandra Gering Gallery, New York and Stalke Kunsthandel, Copenhagen, 1997
- Dove Bradshaw, Contingency and Indeterminacy [Film], Selected quotes about the artist, Stalke Kunsthandel, Denmark, 1996
- Dove Bradshaw, “Living Metal” by Barry Schwabsky, Pier Gallery, Stromness, Orkney, Scotland, 1996
- Dove Bradshaw: Works 1969–1993, "John Cage and Thomas McEvilley: A Conversation", Sandra Gering Gallery, New York, 1993
