= The Shape of Ancient Thought =

2001 book by Thomas McEvilley

- Cover of the first edition
- Author: Thomas McEvilley
- Language: English
- Publisher: Allworth Press
- Publication date: November 1, 2001
- Publication place: United States
- Pages: 768
- ISBN: 978-1-58115-203-6

The Shape of Ancient Thought: Comparative Studies in Greek and Indian Philosophies is a book by the American writer Thomas McEvilley, published in 2001 by Allworth Press.

== Summary ==
Thomas McEvilley traces exchanges between ancient Greek philosophy and ancient Indian philosophy, created through trade, empires and migration. Due to the mutual debts he identifies, often in the form of parallels or documented contacts with Persia, McEvilley argues that the Western world should be considered a product of both Western and Eastern thought.

== Reception ==
In Philosophy East and West, Will S. Rasmussen described The Shape of Ancient Thought as McEvilley's magnum opus, which consists of "an encyclopedic array of texts" and clear arguments for the strong mutual influence between Greece and India. He wrote that McEvilley used "admirable sensitivity" when he rejected dichotomies between the rational and mystical, and covered the often politicized scholarship about the subject.

Emily Kearns wrote in The Classical Review that each chapter can be read as a stimulating essay in its own right. She described The Shape of Ancient Thought overall as eloquent and rarely overstated, as it acknowledges its limits, the possibilities that parallels may be coincidences, and the significant differences that do exist between Greek and Indian philosophy.

== See also ==
- Ancient Greece–Ancient India relations
- Orientalizing period
