= Galerie Perrotin =

Contemporary art gallery in Paris, France

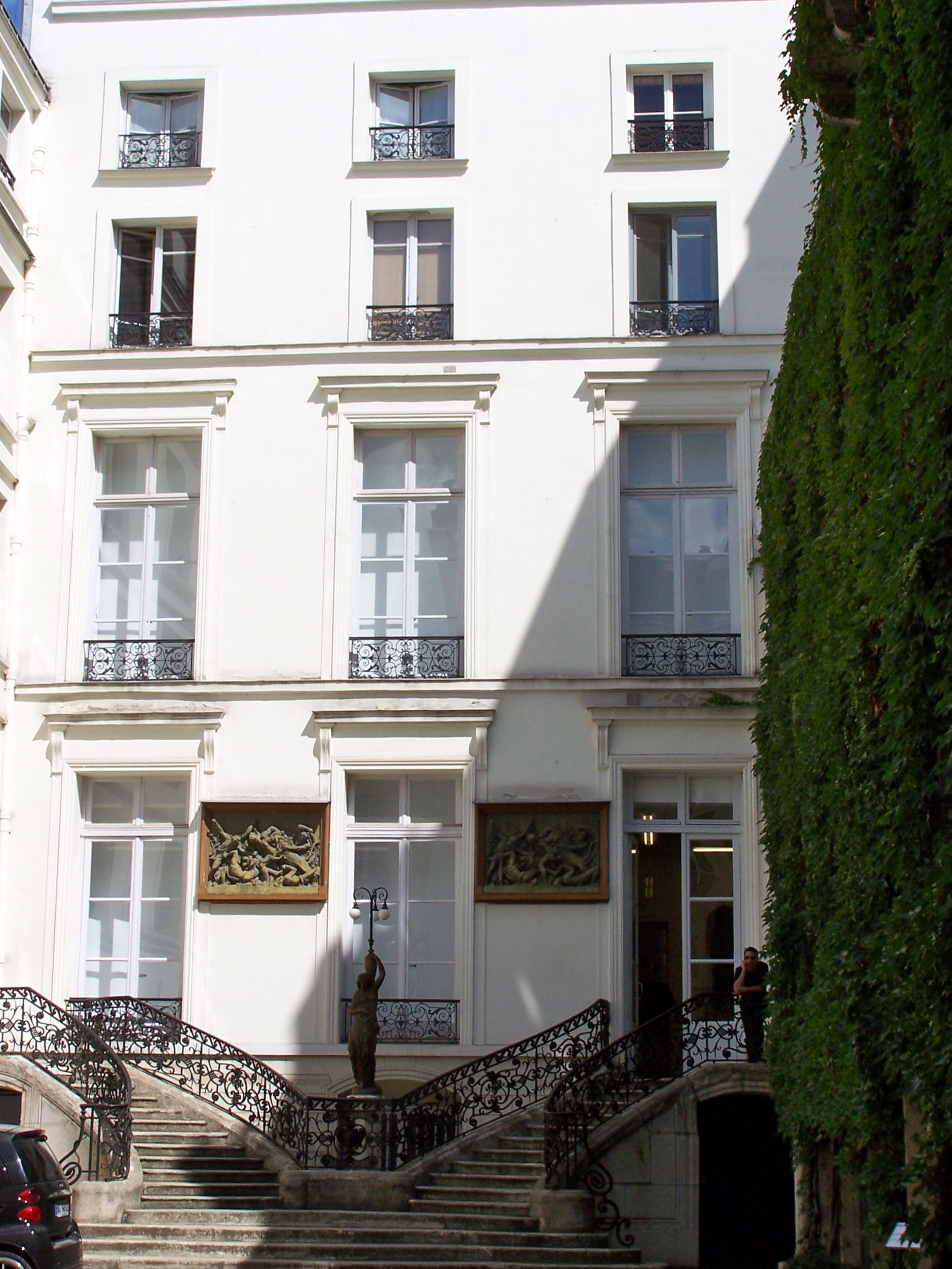
- Perrotin gallery in Paris
- Industry: Art exhibitions, art sales, events, publishing
- Founded: 1990
- Founder: Emmanuel Perrotin
- Headquarters: Paris, France
- Revenue: 140 million euros (France, 2022)
- Number of employees: 180
- Website: perrotin.com

Galerie Perrotin is a contemporary art gallery founded by Emmanuel Perrotin in Paris in the 1990s. It has multiple locations worldwide, including galleries in Paris, Hong Kong, New York, Seoul, Tokyo, Shanghai, and Los Angeles.

== History ==
=== Creation and expansion in Paris ===
Emmanuel Perrotin founded Perrotin gallery in 1990. He initially rented an apartment on Rue de Turbigo and then on Rue de Beaubourg in Paris, which he converted into a gallery. The gallery was then based in various locations in Paris before moving to an 18th-century townhouse in the Marais district in 2005.

In June 2020, the gallery opened a new 70 m^{2} space on Avenue Matignon in western Paris.

The gallery participated in the FIAC (Foire Internationale d'Art Contemporain) in Paris until it closed in 2022. It also participates in Art Paris, Paris+ by Art Basel, and Asia Now.

The Paris gallery welcomes up to 900 visitors daily for certain exhibitions.

=== International expansion ===
In 2012, Perrotin Hong Kong was inaugurated. In 2020, the gallery moved to K11 Atelier, Victoria Dockside, Tsim Sha Tsui.

From 2013 to 2016, Perrotin New York was based in a historic Upper East Side location on Madison Avenue before moving to a landmark building on the Lower East Side. The gallery includes a large bookshop that sells editions and books.

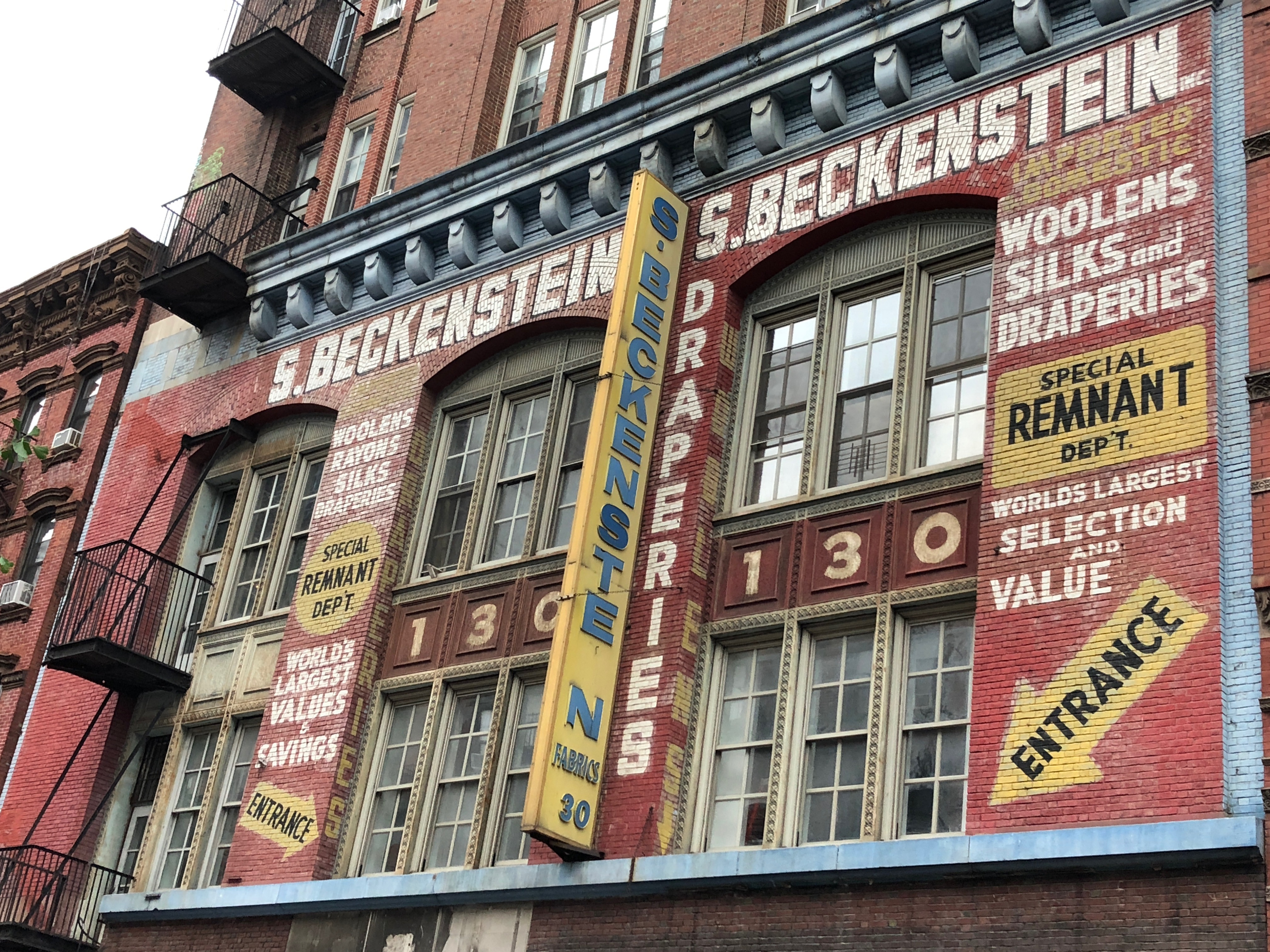
Perrotin's New York façade

In 2016, Perrotin opened a 200 m^{2} gallery in Seoul's Jongno District, next to numerous galleries and museums, opposite the President's residence, the Blue House, and Gyeongbok Palace. In June 2017, Emmanuel Perrotin opened a 140 m^{2} gallery in Tokyo, on the first floor of the Piramide Building at 6-6-9 Roppongi Minato-ku Tokyo, in the heart of Roppongi.

In 2018, a new gallery was inaugurated in Shanghai's Bund district.

In August 2022, Perrotin opened Perrotin Dosan Park in Seoul. The two-story building boasts around 250 square meters of exhibition space and was designed by KIAS (Kentaro Ishida Architects Studio) in collaboration with Yoki Design and Kenny Ho.

In 2022, a new gallery was opened in Dubaï.

In 2020, Perrotin Gallery had a worldwide surface area of 7,100 m^{2}.

Perrotin gallery participates in several annual fairs abroad, including Art Basel (Hong Kong, Basel, Miami), Frieza Art Fair, Art021 & West Bund Art & Design (Shanghai), The Armory Show, and TEFAF New York.

In 2023, Perrotin organized several exhibitions in Los Angeles before opening a new gallery there in 2024.

=== Diversification ===
The gallery also organizes art-related events such as conferences and children's workshops. It produces videos and podcasts ("L'amour de l'art") and publishes artist books, editions, and prints that are sold in its Perrotin Store bookshops. It also has an active presence on social media.

In 2022, Perrotin had a revenue of 140 million euros.

In June 2023, the gallery joined forces with investment fund Colony IM.

== Artist roster (non-exhaustive) ==
- Chiho Aoshima
- Iván Argote
- Hernan Bas
- Sophie Calle
- Maurizio Cattelan
- Julian Charrière
- Johan Creten
- Wim Delvoye
- Elmgreen & Dragset
- Bernard Frize
- Gelitin
- Laurent Grasso
- Hans Hartung
- JR
- Jesper Just
- Bharti Kher
- Julio Le Parc
- Lee Bae
- Barry McGee
- Farhad Moshiri
- Mr.
- Takashi Murakami
- Jean-Michel Othoniel
- Paola Pivi
- Claude Rutault
- Mark Ryden
- Emily Mae Smith
- Pierre Soulages
- Claire Tabouret
- Xavier Veilhan
- Tatiana Trouvé
- Xavier Veilhan
- Bernar Venet
- Xu Zhen
- Nick Doyle
