= Kim Tae-ho (artist) =

South Korean painter (1948–2022)

- 김태호
- Born: 1948; Busan, South Korea
- Died: 4 October 2022 (aged 73–74); Busan, South Korea
- Education: Hongik University (BFA 1972; MA 1984)
- Known for: Painting
- Notable work: Internal Rhythm series
- Movement: Dansaekhwa
- Website: artthkim.com

- Kim Tae-ho
- Hangul: 김태호
- Hanja: 金泰浩
- Revised Romanization: Gim Taeho
- McCune–Reischauer: Kim T'aeho

Kim Tae-ho (Korean: 김태호; Hanja: 金泰浩; 1948 – 4 October 2022) was a South Korean abstract painter associated with Dansaekhwa, the Korean monochrome painting movement. He is best known for his Internal Rhythm (내재율) series, begun in the 1990s, in which more than twenty layers of paint are built up in a grid and then cut back with a blade to expose the colours beneath. The cell-like surfaces of these works led critics to call them "beehive paintings". He taught painting at Hongik University from 1987 to 2016.

== Early life and education ==
Kim was born in Busan in 1948 and lived there until middle school. He then moved to Seoul to attend Seoul Arts High School, where he met Park Seo-bo and became his student.

He studied painting at Hongik University's College of Fine Arts under the abstract painter Yoo Young-kuk and Dansaekhwa painters including Ha Chong-hyun and Chung Sang-hwa. He graduated in 1972 and completed a master's degree in art education at Hongik's Graduate School of Education in 1984.

== Career ==
Kim held his first solo exhibition in 1977, presenting his Form series. In 1982 he won the grand prize at the Gonggan (Space) Print-Making Competition.

He taught in Hongik University's painting department from 1987 to 2016. After retiring, he headed the Kim Tae-ho Formative Research Institute (김태호 조형연구소). He lived and worked in Paju, Gyeonggi Province.

Korean critics generally place him among the "post-Dansaekhwa" painters who followed the movement's first generation, alongside artists such as Lee Bae and Lee Kang-so. In 2021 one of his Internal Rhythm paintings sold for ₩210 million at a Seoul Auction sale. From 2021 he also produced NFT digital works.

== Style and technique ==
Kim's work is commonly divided into three periods: Form paintings made with spray paint, Form works made with hanji (Korean mulberry paper), and the acrylic Internal Rhythm series from the mid-1990s onward.

=== Form in spray paint ===
Begun in 1977, the Form (형상) series hid figurative subjects beneath horizontal bands, an image inspired by the metal shutters covering commercial and bank buildings. Kim made these works mainly with a spray technique.

=== Form in hanji ===
Kim then carried the Form series into hanji, layering the paper onto canvas and shifting his focus from image to material and surface texture. This work led to the Internal Rhythm series.

=== Internal Rhythm ===
For the Internal Rhythm (내재율) series, begun around 1995, Kim drew a fine pencil grid on the canvas. He then applied 20 or more layers of acrylic paint in alternating vertical and horizontal strokes. Once the paint had partly set, he cut into the raised ridges with a specially made carving blade. The cuts reveal the buried colours inside small cell-like pockets between the grid lines. Seen from a distance, a work reads as a single colour; at close range, the hidden layers become visible.

== Death ==
In September 2022, Kim collapsed while visiting Busan. He died there on 4 October 2022, aged 74. The Korean press reported a stroke as the cause of his collapse, while ArtAsiaPacific reported that he died of sepsis. His solo exhibition Traces of Order (질서의 흔적), then on view at Pyo Gallery in Seoul, was extended to 27 October as a memorial exhibition. Park Seo-bo publicly mourned his former student.

== Selected exhibitions ==
- 2022 – Traces of Order, Pyo Gallery, Seoul
- 2022 – Two-person exhibition with Choi Myoung-young, Jeju Dam Studio Gallery, Seogwipo
- 2022 – Internal Rhythms, The Columns Gallery, Singapore
- 2022 – Internal Rhythm – Fractal Microcosmos, Lee Seoul Gallery, Seoul
- 2020–21 – Equilibrium Shifts, Pearl Lam Galleries, Hong Kong
- 2018–19 – The Aesthetics of Lining, Metaphysical Art Gallery, Taipei
- 2016 – Internal Rhythm, Gallery Date, Busan

== Collections ==
Kim's works are held in public collections including the British Museum, London; the National Museum of Modern and Contemporary Art, Korea; the Seoul Museum of Art; the Busan Museum of Art; the Daejeon Museum of Art; the Shimonoseki City Art Museum, Japan; and the museum of the Guangzhou Academy of Fine Arts, China.
