= Hollywood Forever Cemetery =

Cemetery in Los Angeles, California, US

- U.S. National Register of Historic Places
- U.S. Historic district
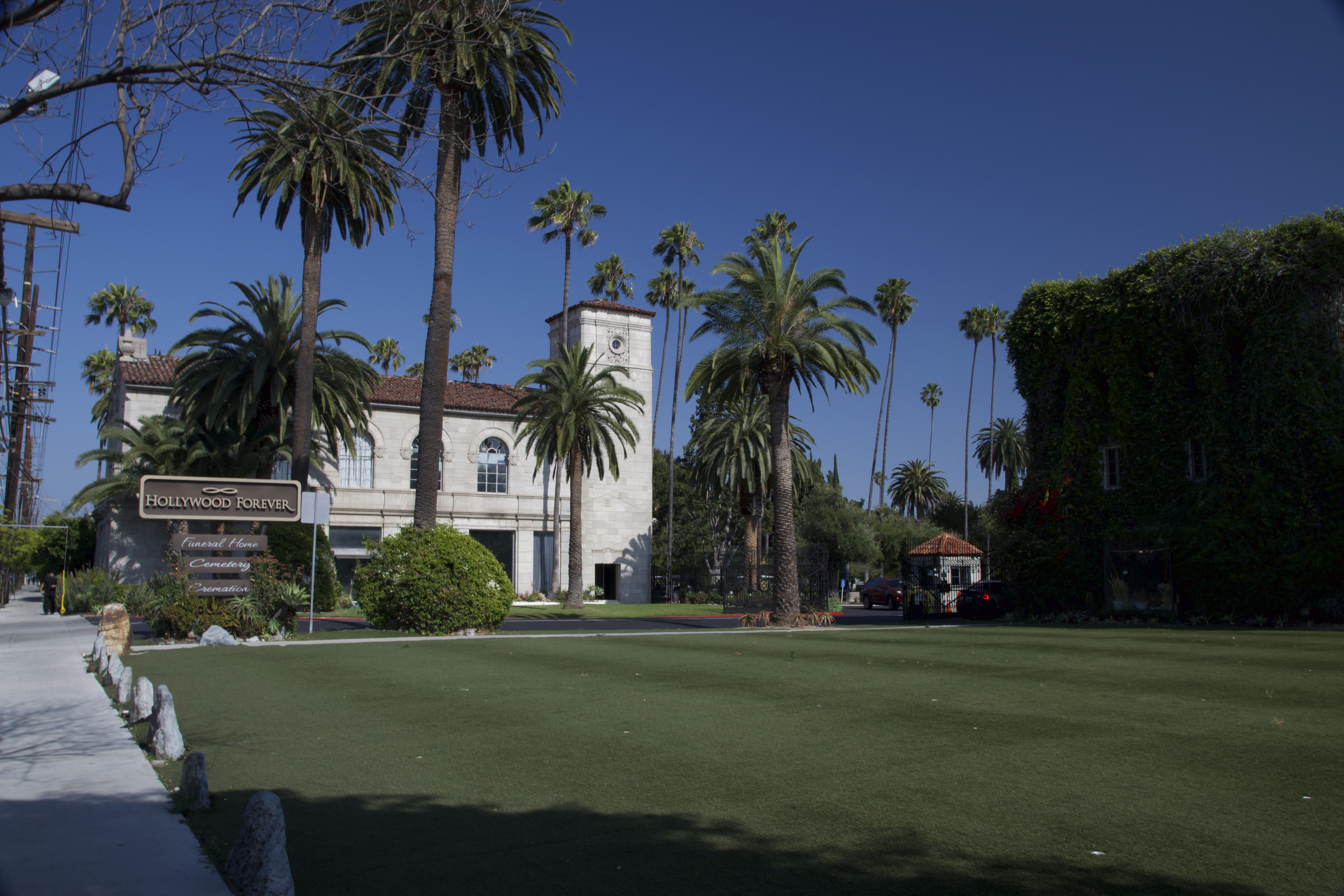
- Entrance of Hollywood Forever

- Location within the Los Angeles metropolitan area Location within California Location within the United States
- Location: 6000 Santa Monica Boulevard; Los Angeles, California; 90038
- Coordinates: 34°5′19″N 118°19′8″W
- Area: 62 acres (25 ha)
- Built: 1899; 127 years ago
- Architect: Multiple
- Architectural style: Exotic Revival, Classical Revival, et al.
- NRHP reference No.: 99000550
- Added to NRHP: May 14, 1999

Hollywood Forever, Inc.
- Type: Private
- Industry: Cemetery
- Predecessor: Hollywood Memorial Park
- Founded: April 3, 1998; 28 years ago
- Headquarters: 6000 Santa Monica Boulevard; Hollywood, California; 90038
- Key people: Tyler Cassity (CEO); Yogu Kanthiah (CFO)
- Owner: Tyler Cassity; Yogu Kanthiah
- Website: hollywoodforever.com

Hollywood Forever Cemetery is a full-service cemetery, funeral home, crematory, and cultural events center which regularly hosts community events such as live music and summer movie screenings. It is one of the oldest cemeteries in Los Angeles, California and is located at 6000 Santa Monica Boulevard in the Los Angeles neighborhood of Hollywood. It was founded in 1899 as Hollywood Cemetery, and starting in 1939 was known as Hollywood Memorial Park, until 1998, when it was given its current name. The studios of Paramount Pictures are located at the south end of the same block, on 40 acres (16 ha) that were once an undeveloped part of the cemetery.

Individuals interred in the cemetery include many famous people from the entertainment industry, as well as people who played vital roles in shaping Los Angeles.

== History ==
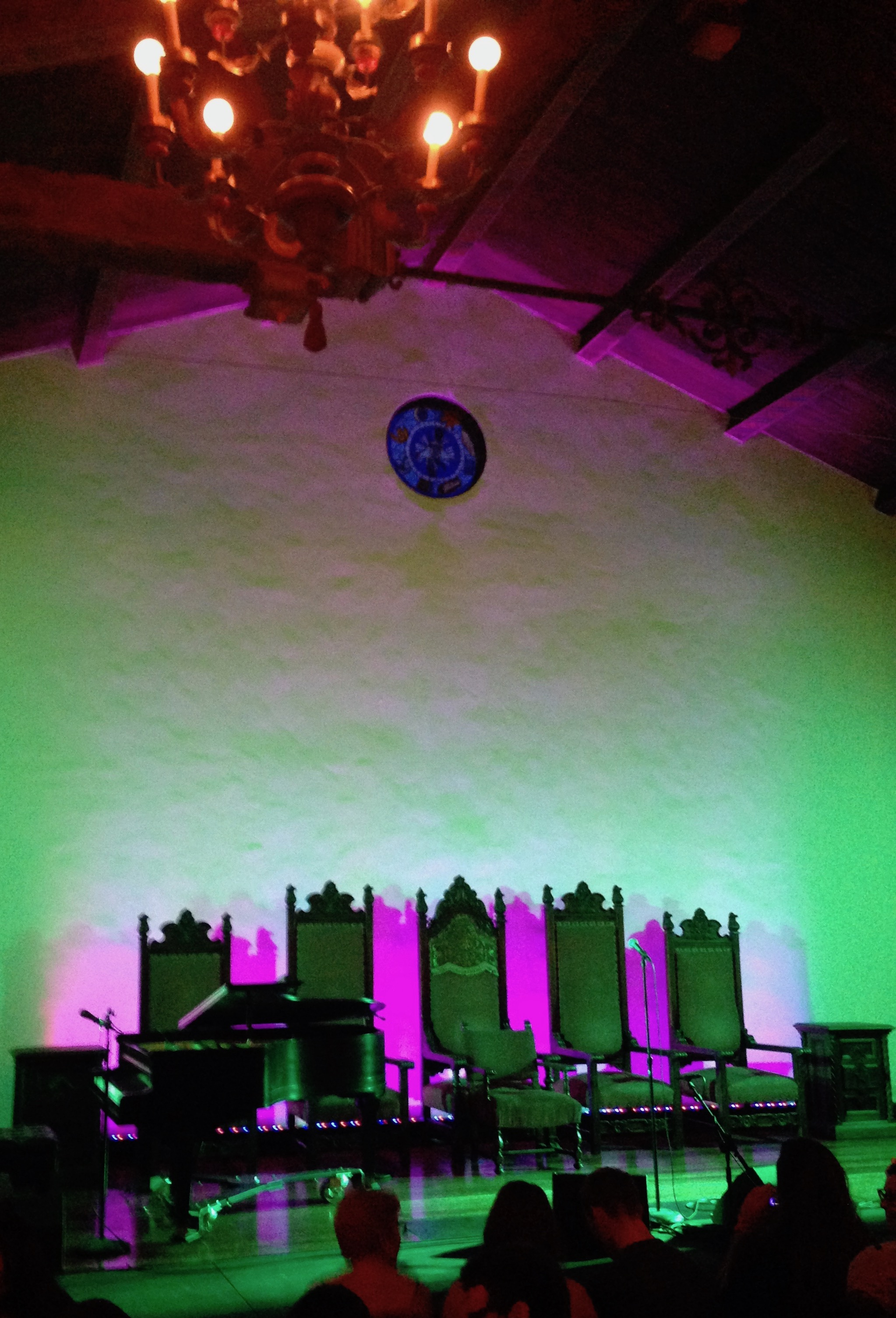
A Masonic lodge on the site is often used as a music venue

The only cemetery actually in Hollywood, Hollywood Forever was founded in 1899 on 100 acres (40 ha) and named "Hollywood Cemetery" by F. W. Samuelson and (first name unknown) Lombard. In 1897, the two men were the owners of a 60 acres (24 ha) tract of land near Hollywood in Los Angeles County. In that year, they—along with Mrs. M. W. Gardner of Santa Monica, Joseph D. Rodford, Gilbert Smith, and Thomas R. Wallace—formed a corporation known as the "Hollywood Cemetery Association". The cemetery sold large tracts to Paramount Pictures, which, with RKO Pictures, bought 40 acres (16 ha) by 1920. Part of the remaining land was set aside for the Beth Olam Cemetery, within the grounds of Hollywood Forever, a dedicated Jewish burial ground for members of the local Jewish community.

Jules Roth (1900–1998) was a convicted felon and millionaire. In 1939, Roth bought a 51% stake in the cemetery, then known as Hollywood Memorial Park, which is the interment site of his parents. He used the money from the cemetery's operations to pay for his personal luxuries, and by the 1980s, the cemetery began to show signs of neglect and disrepair.

Actress Hattie McDaniel, best known for her role as Mammy in the epic movie Gone with the Wind (for which she became the first African American to win an Academy Award), had expressed a desire to be interred at Hollywood Memorial Park. At the time of McDaniel's death in 1952, Hollywood Memorial, like other cemeteries, was segregated. Despite McDaniel's expressed wish, Roth would not allow the actress to be interred in the cemetery, as it was not desegregated until 1959, seven years after her death. In 1999 (the 47th anniversary of McDaniel's death), the cemetery's new owners Tyler and Brent Cassity dedicated a cenotaph in her honor at a prime location south of Sylvan Lake.

In July 1974, the crematory was shut down following the cremation of singer Cass Elliot. According to cemetery grounds supervisor Daniel Ugarte, the crematory was in such disrepair that bricks began falling in around Elliot's remains. The crematory remained closed for twenty-eight years until it was repaired and re-opened on November 28, 2002 with the cremation of an unidentified man. The first cremation to be conducted at the cemetery since the incident, just under a year before the official reopening, was that of George Harrison on November 29, 2001.

By the 1980s, the California Cemetery Board began receiving regular complaints from the families of people interred there. Family members complained that the grounds were not kept up and were disturbed to hear stories about vandalism on the cemetery grounds. The heirs of well-known makeup artist Max Factor (who was interred in the Beth Olam Mausoleum in 1938) moved his and other family members remains to Hillside Memorial Park in Culver City after the mausoleum sustained water damage that discolored the walls.

In 1986, a Los Angeles woman and 1,000 other plot owners filed a class action lawsuit against the cemetery for invasion of privacy after they discovered that Roth allowed employees of Paramount Pictures to park in the cemetery while the studio's parking structure was undergoing construction.

In the late 1980s, Jules Roth sold two lawns totaling 3 acres (12,000 m^{2}) that were facing the Santa Monica Boulevard front of the property. It was reported that the property was paid for with cash. Those lawns are now strip malls that house, among other businesses, an auto parts store and a laundromat.

After the 1994 Northridge earthquake, Roth could not afford to repair the roofs and other damage the earthquake caused to crypts. By that time, Hollywood Memorial was no longer making money and only generated revenue by charging families $500 for disinterments.

In 1997, Roth became ill after he fell in his Hollywood Hills home. He had been embroiled in a scandal regarding another cemetery he owned, Lincoln Memorial Park, in Carson, California in which hundreds of families came forward with a class-action suit over poor record keeping and missing bodies. Several months before his death, Roth was bedridden and disoriented, and during this time, his will was changed to provide for his business associates and maid, who were the only witnesses to his signature. His relatives, who were listed in his previous will, were written out. Roth died on January 4, 1998, and he was interred next to his wife, Virginia, his father, and his mother in the Cathedral Mausoleum. The state of California had revoked the cemetery's license to sell its remaining interment spaces.

After Roth's death, the cemetery's subsequent owners Brent and Tyler Cassity, aka Tyo, LLC, discovered that the endowment care fund—meant to care for the cemetery in perpetuity—was missing about $9 million. Tyler Cassity also claimed that he discovered Roth's bust in an antique shop, and that the bust was part of Roth's personal artifacts that were sold at auction.

Those owners, Tyo, LLC, purchased the now 62-acre (25 ha) property that was on the verge of closure in a bankruptcy proceeding, in 1998 for $375,000. They renamed the cemetery "Hollywood Forever" and set out to give it a complete restoration, investing millions in revitalizing the grounds and also offering documentaries about the deceased that are to be played in perpetuity on kiosks and are posted on the Web, as well as organizing tours to draw visitors.

In 1995, artist Joyce Burstein purchase a burial plot for the sole purpose of creating an artwork and placed a blank slate tombstone designed as a chalkboard, complete with a bronze chalk box and chalk, inviting visitors to write their own epitaphs. Called The Epitaph Project, the permanently installed artwork offers passersby the chance to engage in serious or humorous self-reflection.

Since 2002, the cemetery has screened films on weekends during the summer and on holidays at a gathering called Cinespia. The screenings are held on the Douglas Fairbanks Lawn near the Fairbanks crypt and the films are projected onto the white marble west wall of the Cathedral Mausoleum. Music events take place in the cemetery as well. On June 14 and 15, 2011, The Flaming Lips played at the cemetery in a two-night gig billed "Everyone You Know Someday Will Die", a lyric from their 2002 single "Do You Realize??".

The cemetery contained a Confederate Monument, erected in 1925 and maintained by the Long Beach chapter of the United Daughters of the Confederacy, until August 15, 2017.

On August 17, 2013, electronic/industrial musician Gary Numan recorded a live album at the cemetery during his Splinter World Tour. It was released on February 19, 2016.

Also in 2013, Brent Cassity and his father, James Douglas Cassity, admitted guilt in a $600 million Ponzi scheme involving their control of National Prearranged Services, Inc. Brent Cassity was sentenced to 5 years in federal prison; James "Doug" Cassity was likewise sentenced to 9 years and 7 months. James Douglas Cassity died of natural causes in 2020, following his release by the Federal Bureau of Prisons in an effort to mitigate the spread of COVID-19.

Plans for the Gower Court Mausoleum, a 100-foot-tall mausoleum, began in 2014. A "highrise for the dead," two of the mausoleum's five floors sold out prior to its January 2025 opening. The mausoleum opened with capacity to house over 50,000 deceased, in crypts or niches.

== Cultural references ==
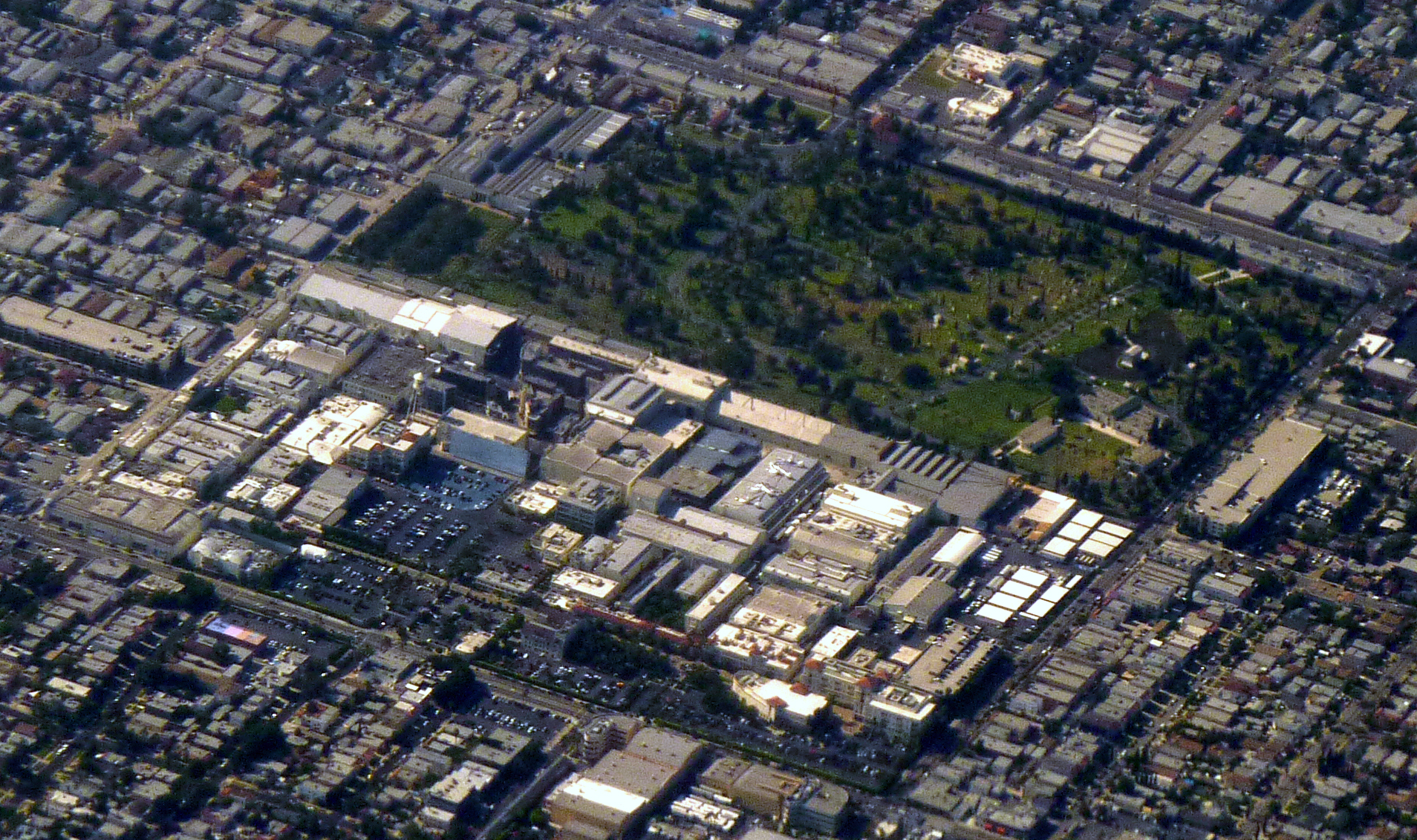
Hollywood Forever Cemetery abuts Paramount Studios on its south end.

The PC game Vampire: The Masquerade – Bloodlines features the cemetery as a playable location.

A documentary about the cemetery called The Young and the Dead, was made in 2000.

The cemetery is briefly shown in the short Stopover in Hollywood. The television series 90210 featured the cemetery in the episode "Hollywood Forever".

Father John Misty released a song titled "Hollywood Forever Cemetery Sings" on his 2012 album titled Fear Fun.

Talking Dead hosted a live 90-minute season premiere on the grounds, immediately following the Season 7 premiere of The Walking Dead. The grounds were also used to air the series finale of Breaking Bad.

A scene in the first episode of American Horror Story: Hotel, "Checking In", was set at Hollywood Forever. It introduced Countess Elizabeth, played by Lady Gaga, and her beau, Donovan played by Matt Bomer.

The cemetery was a featured location in the 2015 Michael Connelly book The Crossing.

The title and opening line of FINNEAS' 2018 song "Hollywood Forever" mentions the cemetery.

David Robert Mitchell's 2018 film Under the Silver Lake depicts a secret music show at the cemetery.

August Ponthier's 2022 song "Hollywood Forever Cemetery" explores the nature of performance and celebrity both in life and after death.

In the 2024 Fallout episode "The Trap," opponents of Vault-Tec hold a covert meeting at the cemetery.

The song "Hollywood Forever" on the 2026 album U by musician Underscores contains the line "Just don't bury me in Hollywood Forever," referring to the singer's ambivalence about becoming famous.

In April 2026, NYC singer-songwriter, Jesse Malin, released a new single, Hollywood Forever - a tribute to his late friend, Howie Pyro.
