= Confederate Monument (Hollywood Forever Cemetery) =

Confederate memorial in Los Angeles

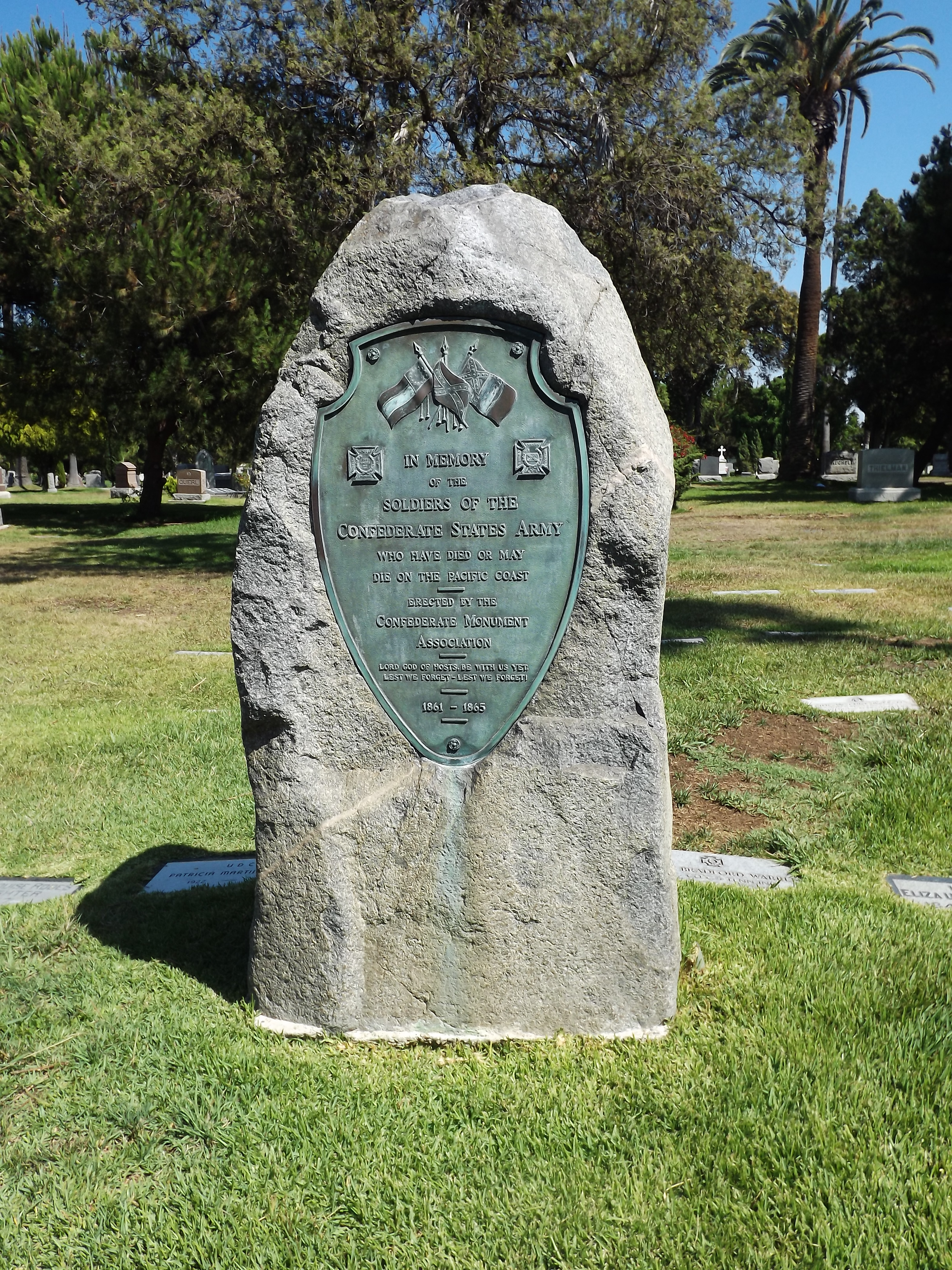
- The monument in 2013
- Location: Hollywood Forever Cemetery, Los Angeles, California, U.S.

The Confederate Monument was a memorial installed in Los Angeles' Hollywood Forever Cemetery, in the U.S. state of California, honoring all Confederates who had died or would die on the Pacific coast. Erected in 1925 in the Confederate section of the cemetery, it was removed in August 2017.

== Description ==
The quotation on the plaque is from Rudyard Kipling's poem "Recessional" (1897): "Lord God of Hosts, be with us yet, Lest we forget—lest we forget!"

== History ==
The monument was "covered with a tarp and whisked away in the middle of the night after activists called for its removal and vandals spray-painted the word 'No' on its back," on August 15, 2017. This was inspired by the events of the white nationalist Unite the Right rally in Charlottesville, Virginia, on August 11–12.

== See also ==
- List of Confederate monuments and memorials
- Removal of Confederate monuments and memorials
