= Thomas McEvilley =

American journalist (1939–2013)

- Born: 13 July 1939; Cincinnati, Ohio, U.S.
- Died: 2 March 2013 (aged 73); New York City, U.S.
- Spouses: Marion McEvilley; Maura Sheehan; Joyce Burstein
- Children: 3

Academic background
- Education: University of Cincinnati (BA, PhD); University of Washington (MA)

Academic work
- Institutions: Rice University; School of Visual Arts; Yale University; School of the Art Institute of Chicago
- Main interests: Philology, art criticism, linguistics, history
- Notable works: Sculpture in the Age of Doubt (1999); The Shape of Ancient Thought: Comparative Studies in Greek and Indian Philosophies (2002)

Thomas McEvilley (/məkˈɛvəli/; July 13, 1939 – March 2, 2013) was an American art critic, poet, novelist, and scholar. He was a Distinguished Lecturer in Art History at Rice University and founder and former chair of the Department of Art Criticism and Writing at the School of Visual Arts in New York City.

== Biography ==
McEvilley was born in Cincinnati. He studied Greek, Latin, Sanskrit, and classical philosophy in the classics programs of the University of Cincinnati where he received a B.A., and the University of Washington, where he received an M.A. He then returned to Cincinnati, where he received a Ph.D. in classical philology. He also retained a strong interest in modern art, reinforced by the artists of his acquaintance.

In 1969, McEvilley joined the faculty of Rice University, where he spent the better part of his teaching career. He was a visiting professor at Yale University and the School of the Art Institute of Chicago, among others. He taught numerous courses in Greek and Indian culture, history of religion and philosophy. In 2008 he retired from teaching after 41 years, residing in New York City and in upstate New York in the Catskills.

He received numerous awards, including the Semple Prize at the University of Cincinnati, a National Endowment for the Arts Critics grant, a Fulbright fellowship in 1993, an NEA critic's grant, and the Frank Jewett Mather Award (1993) for Distinction in Art Criticism from the College Art Association.

McEvilley was a contributing editor of Artforum and editor in chief of Contemporanea.

McEvilley died on March 2, 2013, of complications from cancer at Memorial Sloan-Kettering Cancer Center. He was 73. He is survived by his wife, the artist Joyce Burstein; two sons from a former marriage, Thomas and Monte; a sister, Ellen M. Griffin; and two grandchildren. His son Alexander predeceased him. He was married twice earlier; both marriages ended in divorce.

== Work ==
McEvilley was an expert in the fields of Greek and Indian culture, history of religion and philosophy, and art. He published several books and hundreds of scholarly monographs, articles, catalog essays, and reviews on early Greek and Indian poetry, philosophy, and religion as well as on contemporary art and culture.

=== Art and Otherness ===
In his 1992 book Art and Otherness: Crisis in Cultural Identity, McEvilley collected and revised twelve essays from the 1980s in the midst of the culture wars, the roiling debate regarding the predominance of white, male, Western culture in academia and visual art, and the need for that supremacy to be challenged and opened up to other points of view. McEvilley did this in pointed fashion in "Doctor, Lawyer, Indian Chief," his influential jeremiad against the underlying assumptions that framed the Museum of Modern Art's 1984 exhibition Primitivism and Twentieth Century Art.

=== Toward a Redefinition of Painting for the Post-Modern Era ===
In his 1993 book The Exile’s Return: Toward a Redefinition of Painting for the Post-Modern Era, McEvilley made an important contribution to the late twentieth century "death of painting" debate. He noted that after two decades of decline in importance as a medium, painting revived around 1980. In its return from exile, painting assumed a new theoretical basis in postmodern cultural theory, together with a new kind of self-awareness and interest in its own limitations.

=== Heads It's Form, Tails It's Not Content ===
In the article "Heads it's Form, Tails it's not Content" McEvilley describes a theoretical framework for the formalist project presented by postwar critics such as Clement Greenberg, Michael Fried. He argued that formalist ideas are rooted in Neoplatonism and as such deal with the problem of content by claiming that content is embedded within form. Formalism is based on a linguistic model that Claude Lévi-Strauss argued is given content through the unconscious. In adopting a formalist approach, a critic cannot ignore the content that accompanies every deployment of form.

=== Sculpture in the Age of Doubt ===
In the book Sculpture in the Age of Doubt (1999), McEvilley analyzes the intellectual issues surrounding the postmodern movement in the course of 20th-century sculpture.

=== The Shape of Ancient Thought ===
In The Shape of Ancient Thought, McEvilley explores the foundations of Western civilization. He argues that today's Western world must be considered the product of both Greek and Indian thought, both Western philosophy and Eastern philosophies. He shows how trade, imperialism and currents of migration allowed cultural philosophies to intermingle freely throughout India, Egypt, Greece and the ancient Near East. This book spans thirty years of McEvilley's research, from 1970 to 2000.

== Selected publications ==
Books

- 1964, Party Going (First Novel)
- 1987, North of Yesterday (a Menippean Satire)
- 1991, Art and Discontent
- 1992, Art and Otherness
- 1993, Fusion: West African Artists at the Venice Biennale
- 1993, The Exile’s Return: Toward a Redefinition of Painting for the Post-Modern Era
- 1994, Der Erste Akt
- 1996, Capacity: History, the World, and the Self in Contemporary Art and Criticism (with G. Roger Denson)
- 1999, Sculpture in the Age of Doubt
- 2002, The Shape of Ancient Thought: Comparative Studies in Greek and Indian Philosophies
- 2007, The Triumph of Anti-Art
- 2008, Sappho
- 2010, Art, Love, Friendship: Marina Abramović and Ulay, Together & Apart
- 2010, Yves the Provocateur: Yves Klein and Twentieth-Century Art
- 2013, Charles Dellschau's Aporetic Archive
- 2014, The Arimaspia (Novel, a Menippean Satire)

Monographs

Thomas McEvilley wrote monographs on Yves Klein (1982), Pat Steir, Leon Golub (1993), Jannis Kounellis (1986), James Croak (1999), Dennis Oppenheim, Anselm Kiefer, Dove Bradshaw (2004), Bert Long (2016).

Poetry

- 44 Four Line Poems (1982)
- 17 Ancient Poems (2013)
