= Xavier Veilhan =

French artist (born 1963)

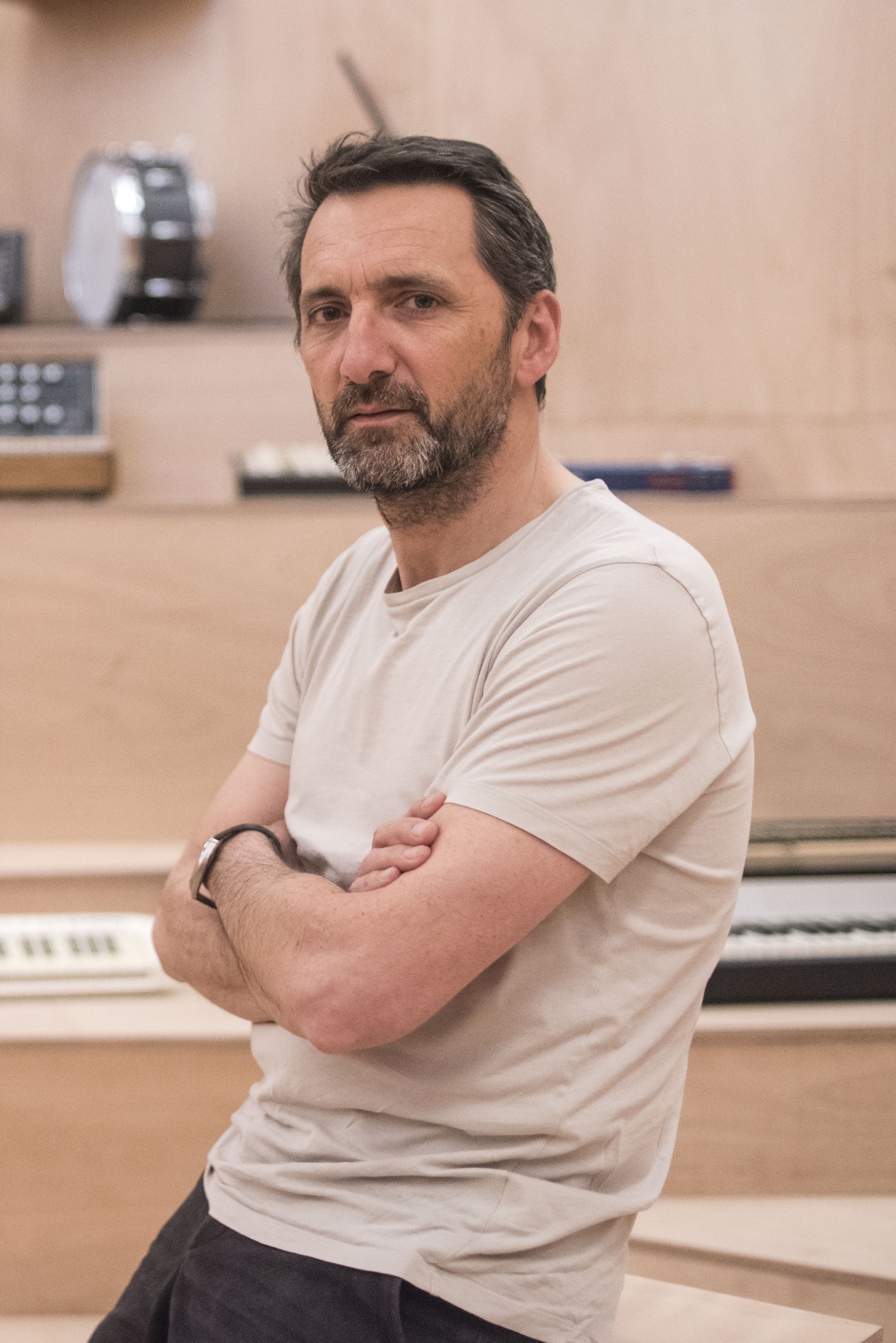
- Veilhan in 2010
- Born: Lyon, France
- Education: ENSAD, Paris
- Known for: Sculpture, installation art, painting, photography, film
- Website: www.veilhan.com

Xavier Veilhan (French pronunciation: [ɡzavje vɛjɑ̃]) is a French artist who works and lives in Paris, France.

== Career ==
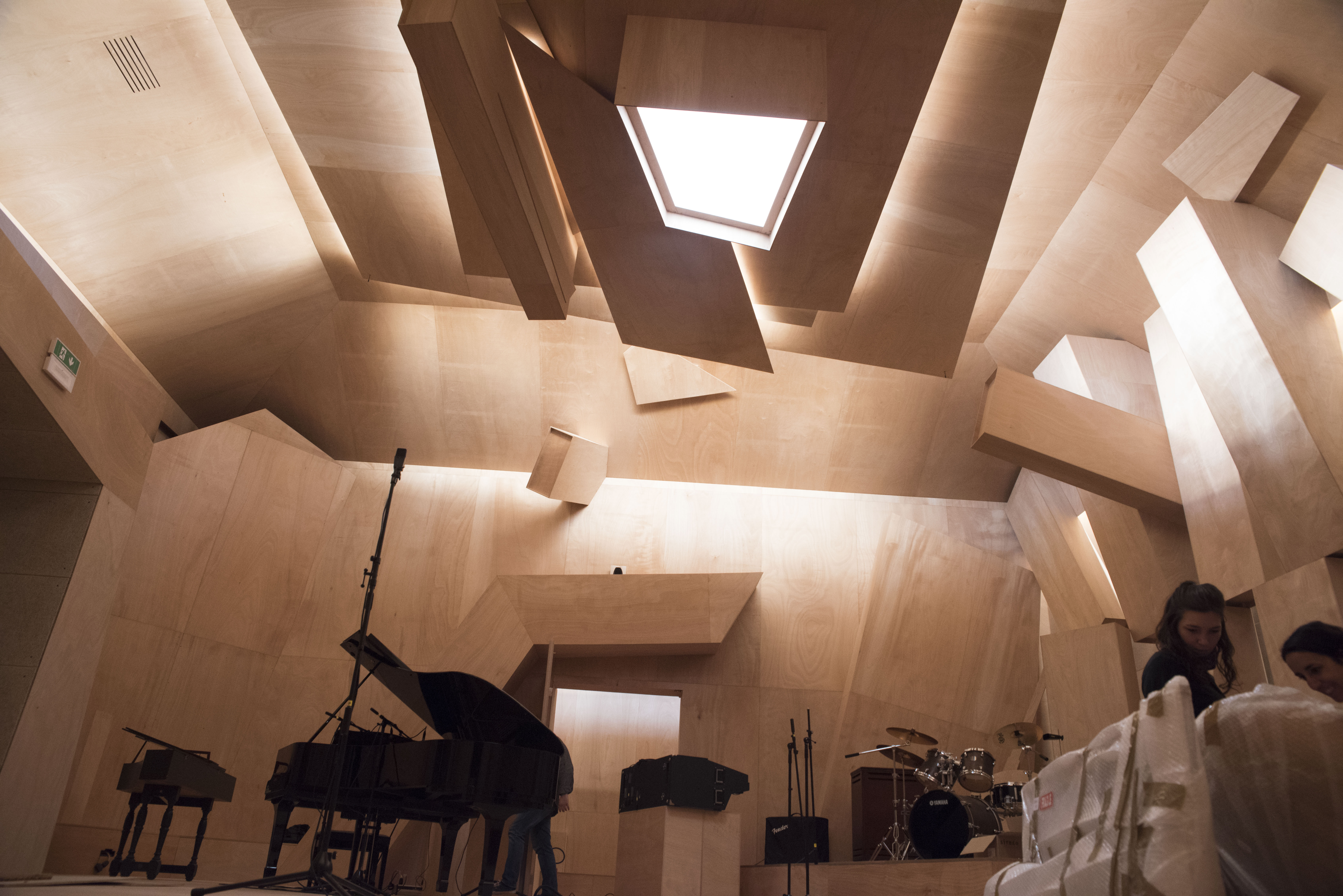
Xavier Veilhan, Studio Venezia (2017) Pavillon français

Significant projects include: Veilhan Versailles at the Palace and Gardens of the Palais de Versailles in 2009; Architectones, a series of interventions between 2012 and 2014 in seven major modernist buildings around the world; Le Château de Rentilly, a continuation and augmentation of his architectural practice, re-designing the entirety of the facades of the building in 2014; the films Vent Moderne (for La Villette, Paris) and Matching Numbers (for 3e Scène, Opéra National de Paris) in 2015.

In 2017 Xavier Veilhan was chosen to represent France at the 57th Venice Art Biennale (May - November 2017). He transformed his national Pavilion into an immersive recording studio dedicated to audio experimentation, curated by Lionel Bovier and Christian Marclay. His Studio Venezia welcomed more than 200 musicians over the course of 7 months. In 2022, he is the first artist invited by CHANEL to imagine the staging of an Haute Couture show.

== Selected exhibitions ==
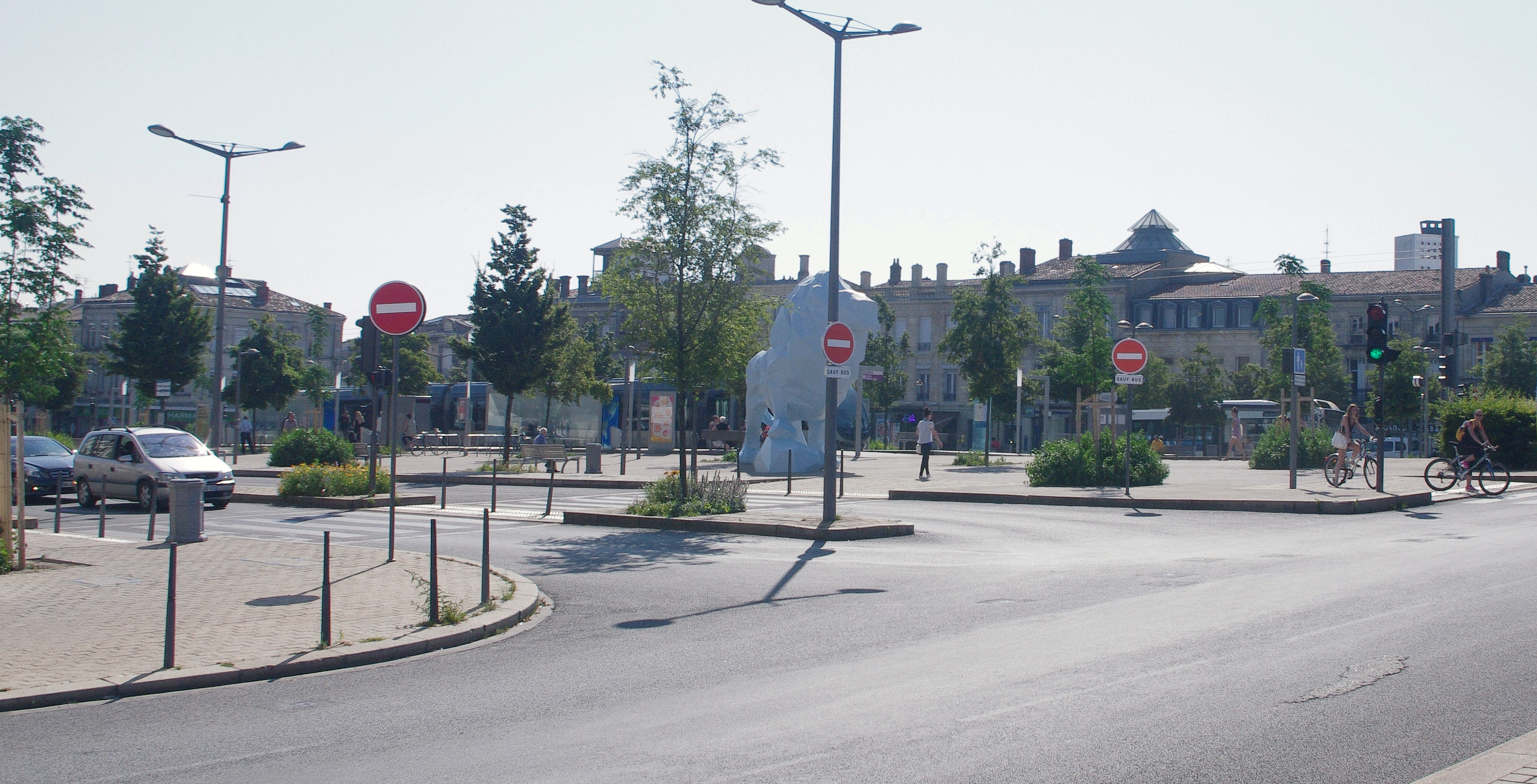
Le Lion, Place Stalingrad (Bordeaux)

Veilhan's art has been exhibited at venues such as Centre Pompidou (Paris), MAMCO (Geneva), The Phillips Collection (Washington), Mori Art Museum (Tokyo) and Fundació Joan Miró, Barbican Centre and Kitakyushu Center for Contemporary Art.

=== Solo exhibitions ===
Year(s)	Title	Venue	Ref
1990	Un peu de biologie	Galleria Fac-Simile, Milano	
1991	Un centimètre égal un mètre	Centre d'art contemporain du parc Saint-Léger	
1993	Xavier Veilhan	Musée d'Art Moderne de Paris, ARC, Paris	
1999	La Ford T	MAMCO, Geneva	
1999	La Forêt	Le Consortium, Dijon	
2000	La Ford T	Musée National d'Art Moderne, Paris	
2000	The Rhinoceros	Yves Saint-Laurent, Wooster Street, New York	
2000	Les Vélos	La Salle de Bains, Lyon	
2000	Xavier Veilhan, une rétrospective	Le Magasin, Grenoble	
2001	Lightworks	Espai 13 in Fundació Joan Miró, Barcelona	
2001	Light Machines	Sandra Gering Gallery, New York	
2002	Xavier Veilhan	Barbican Art Gallery, London	
2002	Installation from the workshop	CCA, Kitakyushu	
2002	Xavier Veilhan	Göteborgs Konsthall	
2003	Keep the Brown	Sandra Gering Gallery	
2004	Vanishing Point	Espace 315 at Centre Pompidou; Écuries de Saint-Hugues, Musée de Cluny	
2004	Light Machines	Fondation Vasarely, Aix-en-Provence	
2004	Le Grand Mobile	Musée National d'Art Moderne, Centre Pompidou, Paris	
2004	The Photorealist Project	National Academy Museum, New York (USA)	
2005	Le Plein emploi	Strasbourg Museum of Modern and Contemporary Art	
2005	Le Projet Hyperréaliste	Rose Art Museum	
2005	People as volume	Andréhn-Schiptjenko, Stockholm	
2005	Fantôme	Centro de Arte Contemporáneo de Burgos (CAB)	
2006	Les Habitants	Cité internationale in Lyon	
2006	Miami Snowflakes	Galerie Perrotin in Miami	
2006	Sculptures automatiques	Galerie Perrotin in Paris	
2007	Xavier Veilhan	Andréhn-Schiptjenko, Stockholm	
2008	Furtivo	Pinacoteca Giovanni e Marella Agnelli	
2009	Veilhan Versailles	Palace of Versailles	
2010	RAL 5015	Artcurial	
2010	Le Carrosse	Place de la République	
2010	Xavier Veilhan	Galerie Perrotin in Miami	
2011	Free Fall	Espace Louis Vuitton, Tokyo	
2011	Dark Matter	Andréhn-Schiptjenko, Stockholm	
2011	Orchestra	Galerie Perrotin in Paris	
2012	Veilhan at Hatfield: Promenade	Hatfield House	
2012	(IN)balance	The Phillips Collection	
2012	Architectones	Neutra VDL Studio and Residences; Bailey House (Los Angeles)	
2012	Rays	La Conservera, Murcia	
2013	Avant	Château de Rentilly	
2013	Mobiles	Galerie Perrotin in Hong Kong	
2013	Architectones	Sheats–Goldstein Residence, Los Angeles; Unité d'habitation, Marseille; Église Sainte-Bernadette du Banlay, Nevers	
2014	Maquettes	Frac Centre	
2014	On/off	Galerie des Galeries	
2014	Architectones	Maison Melnikov in Moscow; Barcelona Pavilion	
2014	Les 30 Ans de Canal+: L'Expo	Palais de Tokyo	
2014	Bodies	313 Art Project, Seoul	
2015	Music	Galerie Perrotin in New York City and in Paris	
2015	Horizonte verde	Galeria Nara Roesler, São Paulo	
2015	Matching Numbers	Paris Opera	
2015	Cedar	Andréhn-Schiptjenko, Stockholm	
2016	Le Baron de Triqueti	Cluny Abbey	
2017	Studio Venezia	Venice Biennale, French pavilion, Venice	
2017	Flying V	Galerie Perrotin in Paris	
2018	Studio Buenos Aires	Kirchner Cultural Centre, Buenos Aires	
2018	Silhouettes (working title)	313 Art Project, Seoul	
2019	PLUS QUE PIERRE	Collégiale-Saint-Martin & FRAC des Pays de la Loire	
2019	Xavier Veilhan	313 Art Project, Seoul	
2019	Channel Orange	Galerie Perrotin in Shanghai	
2019	Nuit mexicaine	Andréhn-Schiptjenko, Stockholm	
2020	The confinement drawings	Perrotin Viewing Room	
2021	Autofocus	Galerie Perrotin in New York City	
2021	Chemin Vert	Galerie Perrotin in Tokyo	
2021	Mobile n°4 (2017)	Musée du Louvre, Paris	
2022	Solo Show	Galeria Nara Roesler, Rio de Janeiro	
2023	Portrait Mode	Galerie Perrotin in Paris	

=== Group exhibitions ===
Year(s)	Title	Venue	Notes	Ref
2000	Xn00	Espace des Arts in Chalon-sur-Saône	Curated by L. Bovier in collaboration with Élisabeth Lebovici, Hans Ulrich Obrist, and others	
2001	Métamorphoses et Clonage	Musée d'art contemporain de Montréal		
2002	Light X Eight	Jewish Museum		
2002	La Part de l'autre	Carré d'Art		
2003	Coollustre	Yvon Lambert Gallery	Curated by Éric Troncy	
2004	None of the Above	Swiss Institute Contemporary Art New York		
2004	L’Eblouissement	Galerie nationale du Jeu de Paume		
2005	Fundacion La Caixa Collection, 20 years with Contemporary Art: New Acquisitions	CaixaForum Barcelona		
2008	Demolition Party	Royal Monceau Palace Hôtel		
2009	Le sort probable de l'homme qui avait avalé le fantôme	Conciergerie		
2010	Catch me	Kunsthaus Graz		
2010	Le Mont Analogue	Centro Cultural Metropolitano		
2011	The Deer	Le Consortium		
2012	Christie's presents House of Cards	Waddesdon Manor		
2014	Le Baron de Triqueti	Cluny Abbey		
2014	Matrix: Mathematicians_Heart of gold and the abyss	National Museum of Modern and Contemporary Art, Korea		
2019	Reshaped Reality. 50 years of Hyperrealistic	Chiang Kai-shek Memorial Hall		
2019	Nouveaux Regards #2	Villa Noailles		
2019	Electro	Musée de la Musique		

== Selected films ==
As a director, Veilhan has worked on:

- 2002: Le Film du Japon
- 2003: Drumball
- 2005: Cruiser
- 2008: Radiator - in collaboration with Michael Elion
- 2008: Furtivo
- 2010: L'affaire Dreyfus
- 2011: Pendule Dripping
- 2015: Vent Moderne
- 2015: Matching Numbers

== Collaborations ==
- Stephen Thompson
  - Compulsory Figures: An installation spectacle and ice performance by Xavier Veilhan for Stephen Thompson, a dancer and ice skater. Co-production: Théâtre National de Bretagne, Espace Malraux-National Scene of Chambéry and Savoie, as part of the European project Corpo Links Cluster, Halles de Schaerbeek/Hallen van Schaarbeek (Brussels), La Villette. Performances: Grande halle de la Villette, Paris (2019); Théâtre National de Bretagne (TNB) (2020) and Espace Malraux in Chambéry.
- Eliane Radigue
  - SYSTEMA OCCAM, 2013: A spectacle by Xavier Veilhan for OCCAM I, a harp piece by Eliane Radigue, performed by Rhodri Davies. Performances: MAMO – Cité Radieuse, Marseille (2013); Florence Gould Hall Theater (Fi:af), New York (2013); Théâtre de la Cité Internationale (Festival New Settings), Paris (2013); Musée national Eugène Delacroix, Paris (2013).
- Sébastien Tellier
  - Sébastien Tellier rencontre Xavier Veilhan, Maison des arts, Créteil, March 25, 2006.
  - Val de Marne, 2006: Xavier Veilhan in collaboration with Sébastien Tellier. MAC VAL, Vitry, December 1–2, 2006.
  - Ville Nouvelle, 2006: Xavier Veilhan in collaboration with Alexis Bertrand. Musical performance with Sébastien Tellier. Nuit blanche, City Hall, Paris.
- Air
  - Artwork - Air's Pocket Symphony album 2007.
  - Aérolite, 2007: Musical performance by Xavier Veilhan with Alexis Bertrand. Music: Air. Centre Georges-Pompidou, Paris, April 7, 2007.
- Daniel Buren
  - La Cabane éclatée aux Paysages fantômes, 2006–2007.
- Ronan & Erwan Bouroullec, facade of Centre Pompidou Metz.
  - Jordan, 2010: Polystyrene, 193.5 × 68 × 40. Erwan & Ronan Bouroullec, 35 Clouds Installation, 2010.
- 120 Nuits
  - Artistic direction, 1983–1984.
