= The Epitaph Project =

Public art installation in Los Angeles, US

Coordinates: 34°05′16″N 118°19′09″W

The Epitaph Project is an interactive public art installation located at Hollywood Forever Cemetery in Los Angeles, established in 1995 by artist Joyce Burstein. It consists of a slate tombstone designed as a chalkboard, with a bronze chalk-box inviting visitors to write their own epitaphs. The project explores themes of mortality, life, and self-discovery.

== Background ==
In 1995, Burstein lived nearby and frequented what was then Hollywood Memorial Park, now Hollywood Forever. The cemetery is the final resting place for many Hollywood legends, including Rudolph Valentino, Mel Blanc, Judy Garland, and Johnny Ramone. Still it had fallen into disrepair and faced financial struggles as it neared its 100th year. During this time, salespeople eager to make a sale offered Burstein a 6x3x9-ft-deep plot at the back of the cemetery for a $68.83 monthly mortgage. Agreeing to the terms, Burstein purchased the plot.

After receiving funds from grants and fellowships, Burstein purchased a solid slate headstone and smoothed its surface to a chalkboard quality. She then had a bronze box made to hold chalk and an eraser, inviting visitors to write their own epitaphs on the slate. Finally, both the headstone and the box were installed at the empty grave plot Burstein had bought to prompt visitors to contemplate life’s impermanence. As Burstein said, “There’s something clarifying about composing or even thinking about one’s own epitaph. There can be a sense of self-discovery as well as both humor and high seriousness.”

Due to the artwork's ephemeral nature, Burstein began documenting the diverse content of visitors' responses as they considered their own epitaphs. Building on this, she assembled a collection of photos documenting the public's interaction with The Epitaph Project. As an extension of the work, Burstein shared those images on a now-defunct website, epitaphproject.com. In addition to an artist's book of the same name, which includes an essay by the philosopher and poet Peter Lamborn Wilson on the transitory nature of the graveyard space and its relationship to Burstein’s project.
