= Lee Bae =

South Korean artist

Lee Bae (born 1956 in Cheongdo, South Korea) is a South Korean visual artist who creates works in black.

During the summer of 2023 a 21 foot high sculpture by the artist, fashioned exclusively from charcoal, was displayed on the pedestrian plaza at Rockefeller Center in Manhattan in New York City. The work was created in continuation of Bae's Issu de Feu series.

Bae lives and works in both Paris and Seoul.

He is represented by Galerie Perrotin.
