= Sandra Gering =

American curator (born 1942)

Sandra Eileen Gering (born Marks 1942) is an American gallerist, curator, and art dealer specializing in modern and contemporary art. She owned and operated commercial galleries in New York City. She is a proponent of conceptual art and interdisciplinary practices.

== Biography ==
Born and raised in Chevy Chase, Maryland, Gering studied dental hygiene at the University of Bridgeport in the early 1960s. From 1964 to 1987, she was married to Norman Charles Gering and lived on Long Island. She took courses in art and arts administration at The New School and at New York University. While a student, Gering began selling art out of her home in Oyster Bay, Long Island. In 1988, she moved to Manhattan and began organizing exhibitions in her West Village townhouse. This period was notable for introducing long-lasting relationships with artists Dove Bradshaw and William Anastasi, as well as the architect Simon Ungers.

== Career ==
Gering opened her first gallery in 1991 on Broome Street in Soho. She held exhibitions there by conceptual artists Janine Antoni, Orlan, Xavier Veilhan, Jose Antonio Hernandez-Diez and George Condo. In 2001, she relocated to New York's Chelsea neighborhood, adding a new focus on technology and diverse media artists John F. Simon Jr., Leo Villareal, Jane Simpson, Craig Kaufman, Matthew McCaslin, Vincent Szarek, David Tremlett, and designer Karim Rashid. From 2006 to 2013, Gering partnered with the Madrid gallerist Javier Lopez, expanding and relocating the gallery to the Crown Building on Fifth Avenue and 57th Street, its large exhibition space designed by the architect Joel Sanders. Gering & Lopez Gallery added pop-influenced artists and exhibitions during this period, including KAWS, Ryan McGinness, Peter Halley, David Levinthal, Michael Bevilacqua and Todd James. The partnership ended in 2013, and Gering moved her gallery to Manhattan's Upper East Side.

Sandra Gering Inc. was located at 14 East 63rd Street. Gering positioned herself as both a gallery and a launching pad for national and international projects. She continues to promote and exhibit emerging and mid-career talent, while expanding her focus to include the management of other activities.

Gering is a member of the Art Dealers Association of America (ADAA), ArtTable, ARCO's International Organizing Committee, and is on the board of directors for Art OMI/The Fields Sculpture Park. Gering maintains a presence in a variety of international art fairs. She participates in panel discussions on contemporary art at venues ranging from the Whitney Museum to the National Arts Club, and is a contributor to arts related fundraisers such as the Stephen Petronio Dance Company.

== E-1027 ==
In 1998, Gering founded Friends of E.1027, an organization dedicated to raising funds and awareness for the restoration and preservation of E-1027: Eileen Gray’s house in Roquebrune-Cap Martin in the south of France. The modernist villa was designed and built by Gray and Jean Badovici between 1926 and 1929. Gray–a pioneer of the modern architecture movement–combined built-in furniture and specific spatial planning to engage the user with the building and site, incorporating the sun and the sea into the house.

Arriving at the site in 1998, Gering found the house in a state of disrepair after years of neglect and vandalism. With Gering's help, the house was purchased by the Conservatoire du littoral, a coastal conservancy agency, and subsequently classified as a French National Cultural Monument in 2000, which insures its survival and recognition as an important site in the world of architecture and design.

Friends of E.1027 has earned not-for-profit status as a sponsored project of the New York Foundation for the Arts, and continues to work with the French government and the township of Roquebrune-Cap Martin. Friends of E.1027 will reopen to the public 2015 as The Eileen Gray Museum, and has a long-term goal of creating a study center and travel grant for architecture and design students.

== Additional ==
In 2013, Gering appeared in Jay-Z’s “Picasso Baby” performance art film, alongside other art industry figures.
