= Jamie Court =

American consumer advocate (born 1967)

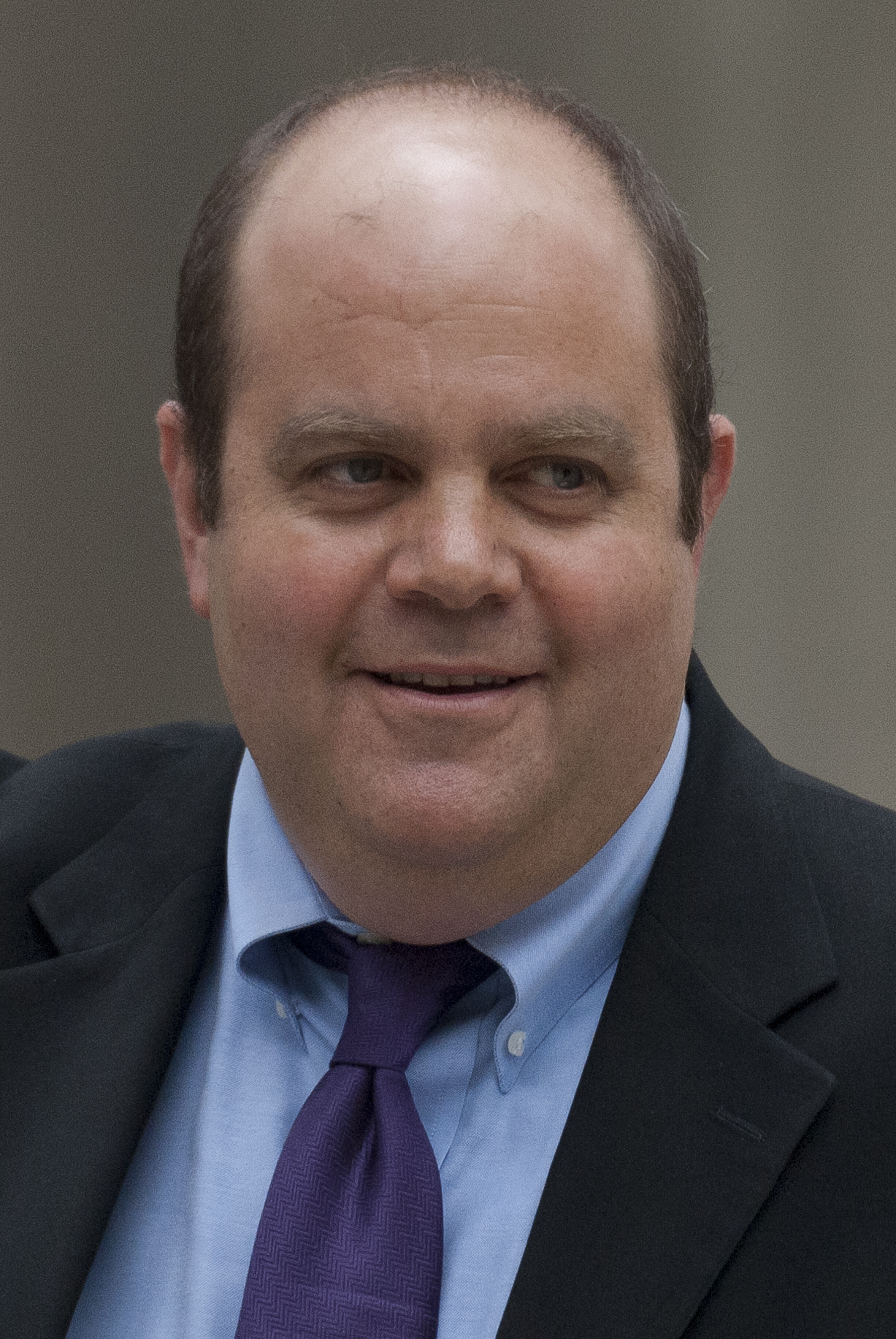
- Born: Jamie Court; April 28, 1967 (age 59); Suffern, New York, U.S.
- Education: Pomona College
- Occupations: Author, political activist, consumer advocate
- Writing career
- Genres: Activism; Politics; Healthcare
- Website: consumerwatchdog.org

Jamie Court (born 1967) is an American author, political activist, lobbyist, and consumer advocate. He serves as president of Consumer Watchdog, a nonprofit public interest group.

Court helped pioneer the HMO patients' rights movement in the United States. He has also led campaigns to reform insurers, politicians, banks, oil companies, and utilities. The Los Angeles Times dubbed Court "a tireless consumer advocate".

Court is the author of Corporateering: How Corporate Power Steals Your Personal Freedom and the co-author of Making A Killing: HMOs And The Threat To Your Health. His newest book, The Progressive's Guide to Raising Hell: How To Win Grassroots Campaigns and Get the Change You Voted For was released September 15, 2010.

Court is also a regular Los Angeles Times op-ed contributor and a commentator on National Public Radio's Marketplace.

== Early career and education ==
Originally from Suffern, New York, Court attended Pomona College in Claremont, California and earned a degree in history. Upon graduation in 1989, Court canvassed door-to-door to raise money for the enforcement of insurance reform ballot initiative California Proposition 103, which passed on November 8, 1988.

From 1990 to 1994, in the wake of President Clinton's welfare reform plan, Court worked as a homeless advocate and community organizer for an interfaith lobbying group called JERICHO and as the associate director of Harbor Interfaith Shelter.

During this period, Court began pioneering the unusual activism tactics he became known for later in life. For example, in an effort to save public assistance programs in Los Angeles County, Court bussed hundreds of homeless people from skid row and signed each of them up for the two-minute public comment, required by law, to talk about their plight and how the city's cuts would affect them.

== Consumer Watchdog ==
In 1994, Court joined fellow consumer activist and Proposition 103 author Harvey Rosenfield to build Consumer Watchdog then known as the Foundation for Taxpayer and Consumer Rights. Consumer Watchdog named Court president of the organization in 2003.

=== HMO patients' rights ===
Court began his career at Consumer Watchdog as the head of Californians for Quality Care, working to reform the HMO system in the state. Here his theatrical style of muckraking matured. For example, during a legislative meeting in Sacramento, Court and his team placed a red herring on the table to signify that the proposed HMO reform was a deliberate attempt to divert attention.

He also created a daily "HMO casualty of the day," where he faxed patient faces and stories to lawmakers to show how HMOs were hurting citizens of the state.

Court's pioneering work for HMO patients' rights made Consumer Watchdog a national voice in the HMO reform debate. In 1996, Court worked with Rosenfield and the California Nurses Association to have a first patients' bill of rights proposition placed on the California ballot. However, Proposition 216 failed to pass garnering only 38.7% of the vote.

In 1998, Consumer Watchdog advocated for legislation, ultimately signed into law by California Governor Gray Davis, to extend broad need rights to HMO patients. To bring attention to the issue, Court dumped a truck load of pinto beans at an HMO industry conference to point out Consumer Watchdog's opposition to HMO "bean counters" overriding doctors' decisions. Most of the legislative package passed with the help of the California Nurses Association in November 1998.

After California had the strongest HMO patient protection laws in America. Many of the provisions of California's bill were included in the national U.S. Patients' Bill of Rights Act, which passed Congress in 2001.

=== Financial privacy ===
Court fought for financial privacy legislation in 2002. The legislation, which required consumers to opt in before financial services companies shared their personal information with other companies, had public support, but lawmakers wouldn't move it forward. Court wanted to expose how much personal information was for sale on the Internet for a relatively cheap price. To prove his point, Court published the partial social security numbers legislators opposed to financial privacy on his website. As a result of his tactics, and the signature gathering help of e-loan's Chris Larsen, Governor Davis signed the "country's toughest financial privacy legislation."

=== Arnold Watch ===
In 2003, Court launched Arnold Watch to expose Governor Arnold Schwarzenegger's ties to special interests. Consumer Watchdog also targeted four Schwarzenegger-backed proposition on the ballot in a special election in 2005. Specifically, Proposition 74, which would have lengthened the time it takes for teachers to get tenure, Proposition 75, which would have limited public employee unions' political spending, Proposition 76, which would have limited California's spending and Proposition 77, which would have removed lawmakers ability to redistrict the state. Consumer Watchdog's grassroots efforts lead to the defeat of the propositions and changed Schwarzenegger's governorship.

=== Oil Watchdog ===
In 2005, Court helped create Oil Watchdog, a subgroup of Consumer Watchdog tasked to "expose about the profiteering, power, and unscrupulous practices of the oil industry". He worked to bring attention to Proposition 87, a "$4 billion program with goal to reduce petroleum consumption by 25%, with research and production incentives for alternative energy, alternative energy vehicles, energy efficient technologies, and for education and training", funded by a "tax of 1.5% to 6% (depending on oil price per barrel) on producers of oil extracted in California." The proposition was voted down by the voters, 54.7% opposed to 45.3% in favor.

=== Insurance reform ===
During 2010, Court and his team fought Proposition 17, a $16 million attempt by Mercury Insurance Group to repeal a key provision of Proposition 103. Consumer Watchdog and its sister organization the Campaign for Consumer Rights "argued that the measure would have allowed Mercury and other companies to impose surcharges of as much as $1,000 on drivers who have not had continuous coverage." To raise awareness of the fact that an insurance company was trying to hide its sponsorship of Proposition 17, and its CEO was afraid to debate the merits of the proposal in public, the group sent a man in a chicken suit to legislative hearings on the measure. The group was outspent 12-to-1, but the measure was defeated on June 8, 2010.

=== Inside Google ===
Court works closely with John Simpson on Consumer Watchdog's Inside Google project. Funded by the Rose Foundation, Inside Google's goal is to educate the general public "about the need for greater online privacy, and to hold Google accountable for tracking consumers online without explicit permission and for exhibiting its monopolistic power in dangerous ways."

In 2010, to bring attention to Google's privacy issues, Consumer Watchdog checked networks in California Representative Jane Harman's home to see if her unencrypted Wi-Fi network might have been tapped when the company captured images for the Google Streetview service of Google Maps.

Also in 2010, the group created a cartoon video of Google CEO Eric Schmidt as an ice-cream truck driver interested in gathering data about the children on his route. The video aired in Times Square and received media attention.

Because of Consumer Watchdog's work, Google allegedly tried to influence the Rose Foundation to halt funding for Inside Google.

=== Controversy ===
In 2011, Court's tactics attacking legislators, described as "Keystone Kops" tactics, were publicly criticized. These tactics included launching a TV ad against a state senator.

In 2017, a Los Angeles Times investigation found that Court and Consumer Watchdog do not disclose contributions to their nonprofit organization, raising questions about certain actions the group has taken.

In 2023, a Politico article described Court's recent successes with Governor Gavin Newsom's administration, having "chalked up some significant policy wins as the costs of climate change have started hitting people's pocketbooks," and noted criticism that he had previously been tagged a "complainer for hire".

In 2022, IRS filings showed that Jamie Court received more than $400,000 in compensation.

== Works ==
=== Making a Killing ===
Published in 1999 by Common Courage Press, Court, with co-author Francis Smith, wrote Making a Killing: HMOs and the Threat to Your Health. The book presents case histories of Americans who have been hurt by the HMO industry. As well, the book suggests ways the HMO system could be more beneficial to consumers. Ralph Nader called the book "a gripping story of excessive power without restraint that comes down hard on powerless and defenseless people.

=== Corporateering ===
Corporateering: How Corporate Power Steals Your Personal Freedom...And What You Can Do About It was published by Tarcher Putnam in 2003. The book's premise is that corporations rob consumers of personal freedoms. Court outlines strategies to reverse the damage. The Associated Press called the book "A thought-provoking look at the condition of American society."

=== The Progressive's Guide to Raising Hell ===
Court's newest book, The Progressive's Guide to Raising Hell: How to Wage Winning Campaigns, Pass Ballot Box Laws and Get the Change We Vote For was released September 15, 2010 by Chelsea Green Publishing.

== Awards ==
- Consumer Attorneys of California Consumer Advocate of the Year
- Los Angeles Business Journal's Who's Who Of Health Care

== Personal ==
Court is married to Michelle Williams Court. The couple live in Los Angeles with two sons.

== See also ==
- Consumer Watchdog
- Harvey Rosenfield
- John M. Simpson
