= John Simpson =

John, Johnny, or Jock Simpson may refer to:

== Politicians ==
- John Simpson (Parliamentarian), politician of the post-English Civil War period, see Thomas Kelsey
- John Simpson (Kentucky politician) (died 1813), American attorney and politician
- John Simpson (MP for Wenlock) (1763–1850), English member of parliament for Wenlock
- John Simpson (Lower Canada politician) (1788–1873), government official and politician in Quebec
- John Simpson (Niagara politician) (1807–1878), Canadian businessman and politician
- John Simpson (Ontario politician) (1812–1885), Ontario banker and member of the Senate of Canada
- Sir John Hope Simpson (1868–1961), British Liberal politician and administrator in India
- John A. Simpson (1854–1916), Canadian politician
- John Thomas Simpson (1870–1965), Conservative member of the Canadian House of Commons
- John Simpson (died 1803), British member of parliament for Mitchell
- John Simpson (Kansas politician) (born 1934), former Kansas state senator

== Cultural figures ==
- John Simpson, bassist in the American R&B band The S.O.S. Band
- John Simpson (artist) (1782–1847), British painter who painted The Captive Slave
- John Simpson (actor/producer), Canadian actor
- Sir John William Simpson (1858–1933), English architect
- John Simpson (architect) (born 1954), British modern-day classical architect
- John Palgrave Simpson (1807–1887), Victorian playwright
- John L. Simpson (born 1963), Australian film and theatre producer, writer and distributor
- John Simpson (journalist) (born 1944), BBC journalist, foreign correspondent and author

== Academic figures ==
- John Simpson (silversmith) (1925–2025), British-born New Zealand teacher and silversmith
- John Baird Simpson (1894–1960), Scottish geologist
- John B. Simpson (born 1947), former president of the University at Buffalo
- John Wistar Simpson (1914–2007), American electrical engineer
- John Simpson (lexicographer) (born 1953)
- John Alexander Simpson (1916–2000), physicist
- John Simpson (British nuclear physicist) (born 1958)

== Sports figures ==
- Jock Simpson (1886–1959), England and Blackburn Rovers footballer
- John Simpson (footballer, born 1918) (1918–2000), English footballer, played for Huddersfield Town and York City
- John Simpson (footballer, born 1933) (1933–1993), English footballer, played for Lincoln City and Gillingham
- John Simpson (boxer) (born 1983), Scottish featherweight boxer
- John Simpson (English cricketer) (born 1988), Sussex County Cricket Club
- John Simpson (New Zealand cricketer) (1907–1980), Auckland cricket team
- John Simpson (fencer) (1927–2016), Australian Olympic fencer
- John Simpson (basketball), professional basketball player
- John Simpson (American football) (born 1997), American football offensive lineman
- Johnny Simpson (1922–2010), New Zealand rugby union player
- John Simpson (rugby union) (1872–1921), Scottish rugby union player

== Military figures ==
- John Simpson (soldier) (1748–1825), American Revolutionary War soldier at the Battle of Bunker Hill
- John Simpson (VC) (1826–1884), Scottish recipient of the Victoria Cross
- John Simpson Kirkpatrick (1892–1915), Australian World War I war hero (who enlisted as "John Simpson")
- John Frederick Simpson (1905–1942), Australian corporal who was executed in the Ration Truck massacre
- John Simpson (RAF officer) (1907–1967), senior RAF officer in the mid-1950s and eighth Commandant Royal Observer Corps
- John Simpson (British Army officer) (1927–2007), British Army officer and director of the SAS

== Miscellaneous figures ==
- John Simpson (journalist/consumer advocate) (born 1948), American consumer rights advocate and former journalist
- John Simpson (Presbyterian) (1740–1808), of South Carolina, in the American Revolutionary War
- John Simpson (Unitarian) (1746–1812), of Bath, English Unitarian minister and religious writer
- John Woodruff Simpson (1850–1920), American lawyer and founding partner at Simpson Thacher & Bartlett
- John D. Simpson (1901–1988), Canadian businessman in the Canadian Mining Hall of Fame
- John Milton Bryan Simpson (1903–1987), American judge
- John Simpson (police official) (1932–2017), director of the U.S. Secret Service and Interpol
- John Simpson (priest) (1933–2019), Anglican clergyman
- John Simpson (trapper), 18th-century hunter and trapper in western Virginia

== See also ==
- John Simson (1668–1740), Scottish theologian
- Jack Simpson (disambiguation)
- Jackie Simpson (disambiguation)
