= List of people from Beckley, West Virginia =

This is a list of people who were born in, lived in, or are closely associated with the city of Beckley, West Virginia.

== Athletics ==
- Joe Goddard, professional baseball player
- Doug Legursky, professional football player
- Bob Pruett, American football coach
- Tamar Slay, basketball player for Sutor Basket Montegranaro, formerly with the New Jersey Nets
- Joe Stydahar, former NFL player and coach, West Virginia Sports Hall of Fame

== Arts & entertainment ==
- Rob Ashford, choreographer
- Mark Carman, producer, songwriter, musician
- Cora Sue Collins, actress
- Little Jimmy Dickens, singer
- Tom Maddox, author
- Scott McClanahan, writer
- Chris Sarandon, actor
- Art Simmons, musician
- Calvin Simon, musician
- Morgan Spurlock, filmmaker
- Bill Withers, musician

== Politics ==
- Jennifer Belcher, former member of the Washington State House of Representatives, first female Washington State Commissioner of Public Lands
- Tom Carper, U.S. senator from Delaware
- Barbara M. Clark, New York state legislator
- Brian Helton, member of West Virginia Senate, from the 9th district
- Todd Kirby, judge of the 14th Circuit Court of West Virginia, former member of West Virginia House of Representatives
- Richard Fred Lewis, justice of the Supreme Court of Florida, 52nd chief justice of Florida
- Nick Rahall, U.S. representative
- Hulett C. Smith, governor of West Virginia
- Joe L. Smith, member of the U.S. House of Representatives, from West Virginia's 6th district

== Other ==
- Natalie Cochran, convicted criminal
- B. Kwaku Duren, lawyer, educator, writer, editor
- George Joseph, founder of Mercury General
- Jon McBride, astronaut
- Stephen M. Pachuta, retired United States Navy admiral
- Christa Pike, convicted murderer
