= Harvey Rosenfield =

American lawyer (born 1952)

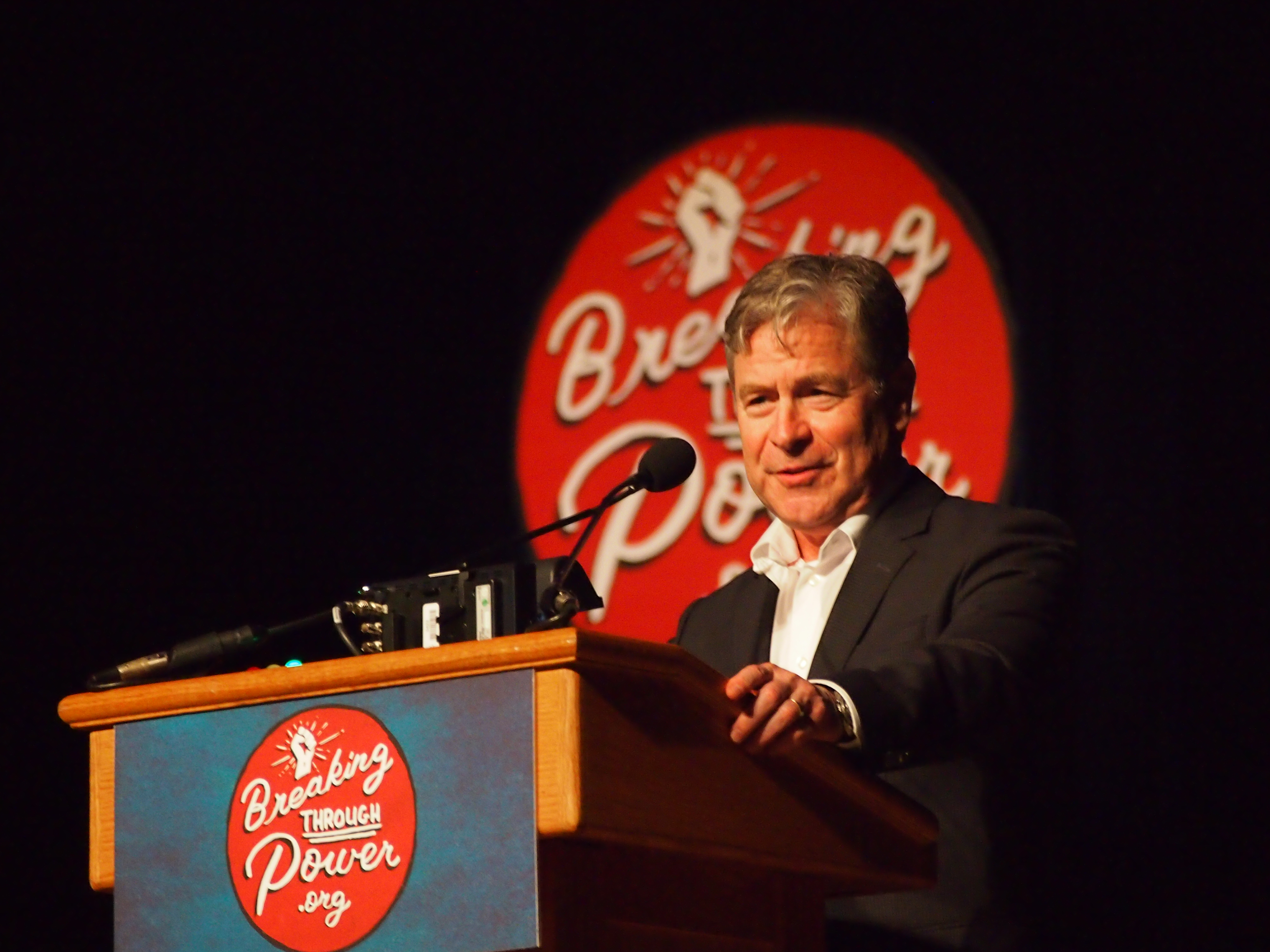
- Rosenfield in 2016
- Born: September 7, 1952 (age 73); Boston, Massachusetts, U.S.
- Education: Amherst College, Georgetown Law School
- Occupations: Lawyer, author, political activist, consumer advocate
- Writing career
- Genres: Activism; Politics; Healthcare
- Website: consumerwatchdog.org

Harvey Rosenfield (born 1952) is an American lawyer, author and consumer advocate. In 1985, he founded Consumer Watchdog, a nationally recognized, nonpartisan nonprofit public interest group. He serves as the group's counsel.

He is best known for drafting, and organizing the campaign for, Proposition 103, a ballot proposal that rolled back automobile insurance rates in California. In 2014, the Consumer Federation of America estimated that Proposition 103 has saved California consumers over $100 billion since 1988. Rosenfield's consumer advocacy work focuses on insurance company overcharges, health care patient protection, and other consumer rights.

== Early life and education ==
Rosenfield was born in Boston, Massachusetts in 1952 and grew up in Randolph. His father was an accountant and his mother, a painter and poet. In 1970, Harvey Rosenfield was involved in his first grass roots campaign: the "Smoke Out" at Randolph High School. The campaign encouraged community members to give up smoking for a day and donate the monetary equivalent of a pack of cigarettes to a scholarship fund. Rosenfield's high school guidance counselor, Art Mullaney, originated the idea and Rosenfield attributes his "success to [Mullaney]" and others who mentored him. The group raised $4500 and attracted the attention of the American Cancer Society, which used the "smokeout" theme in its "Great American Smokeout" campaign, beginning in 1977.

In 1970 Rosenfield entered Amherst College and studied psychology, though he later decided to pursue studies in law. After graduating magna cum laude in 1974, Rosenfield moved to Washington, D.C. to intern with Massachusetts Congressman Michael Harrington. In the fall of 1974, he began a joint degree in law and international affairs at Georgetown University.

== Early career ==
In 1976, Rosenfield took a $600 internship with his future mentor, Ralph Nader at Public Citizen, a Washington D.C. citizen advocacy group. Three years later, after graduating from Georgetown, Rosenfield began working full-time for Nader's Public Citizen Congress Watch as an energy lobbyist opposing nuclear power in 1979. Rosenfield fought for alternative energy sources and environmental conservation in the wake of the 1979 oil crisis when Congress considered a fossil fuels and nuclear strategy for energy independence.

Nader asked Rosenfield to go to California and help grow the California Public Interest Research Group (CALPIRG) in 1981. As program director, he lobbied on a variety of issues including utility and campaign finance reform and public access to government. The goal was to "bring Nader style advocacy to the West Coast."

Rosenfield resigned from CALPIRG in 1985. Later that year, Nader asked him to campaign against Proposition 51, an insurance industry backed initiative on the California ballot that limited damage claims on lawsuits, which the industry claimed were responsible for skyrocketing insurance rates.

== Consumer Watchdog ==
During the same period he was fighting against Proposition 51, Rosenfield founded Consumer Watchdog (originally the Foundation for Taxpayer and Consumer Rights). Proposition 51 passed, but Rosenfield continued to work for insurance rate reductions with his newly formed public interest group. After researching the issue, Rosenfield believed insurance regulation was the only solution to rising rates. In response, Rosenfield drafted new insurance reform legislation, which insurance industry lobbyists killed in the state capitol.

=== Proposition 103 ===
In 1987, Rosenfield began to write a ballot box proposal and formed a campaign to sponsor it called Voter Revolt. The proposal turned into insurance reform Proposition 103 and promised voters a minimum 20% rollback in rates for property, auto and other kinds of insurance. It also required insurance companies to follow the state's consumer protection and civil rights laws. Voter Revolt operated on a $2.9 million budget, a fraction of the insurance industry's $63 million lobbying and advertising effort. The insurance industry, fearing they would not be able to defeat Proposition 103, launched three competing initiative measures in an attempt to confuse voters.

To bring attention to his cause, Rosenfield used grassroots publicity stunts like having guards accompany him while he delivered the signatures that put Proposition 103 on the ballot. As well, he attempted to deliver truckloads of cow manure to the headquarters Farmers Insurance of Los Angeles. Rosenfield often referred to insurance companies as "outlaws" during the campaign. These stunts, many 18-hour days, canvassers knocking on 1 million doors, and the high-profile endorsement of his mentor, Ralph Nader, helped Voter Revolt pass the initiative in November 1988. The win was seen as a huge blow to the insurance industry. After Proposition 103 passed, Rosenfield told the Wall Street Journal that he gotten inquiries from public interest groups "in at least 30 other states expressing interest in launching Proposition 103-style initiatives."

Since then, Rosenfield, and his colleagues at Consumer Watchdog defended Proposition 103 from insurance industry attacks and ensured the proposition's implementation. In 2008, the Consumer Federation for America estimated that Proposition 103 had saved consumers over $63 billion since 1988. That organization updated its estimate in 2013, concluding that Proposition 103 had saved California motorists over $100 billion, an average annual savings of $345 per household, $8,625 per family. Using insurance industry data, CFA found that "between 1989 and 2010, auto insurance premiums actually dropped by 0.3%, while they rose 43.3% nationally during that period. California was the only state in the nation where prices dropped over the 22 year period."

Rosenfield opposed Proposition 17, a $16 million attempt by Mercury Insurance Group to repeal a key provision of Proposition 103 in 2010; it was defeated. The company spent another $17 million on a very similar initiative in 2012; it too was defeated. In 2012, an initiative to control health insurance costs similarly to Prop 103 received over 800,000 signatures and earned a place on the 2014 ballot.

However, critics of California Proposition 103 claim it is responsible for California's insurance crisis. In March 2024, the editorial board of the Orange County Register called for its repeal, saying "Prop. 103 didn't solve California's insurance problems, but made them worse. Time to cancel it."

Proposition 103's benefits to policyholders have been questioned by independent researchers, including the International Center for Law & Economics. Contrary to claims that Proposition 103 saved Californians as much as $154 billion in auto insurance premiums from 1989 to 2015, it found that Californians would have saved nearly $25 billion if they had not passed Proposition 103.

=== Health Care Reform and HMO patients' rights ===
In 1994, during the Clinton healthcare debate, Rosenfield began working to reform the HMO industry. He and his colleague Jamie Court created Californians for Quality Care (a division of Consumer Watchdog) to spearhead the effort. In 1996, the group worked to have the nation's first "patients' bill of rights" proposition placed on the California ballot. However, Proposition 216 failed to pass, garnering only 38.7% of the vote.

In 1998, the group proposed additional HMO patient's rights legislation. To bring attention to the issue, the group dumped a truck load of pinto beans at an HMO industry conference to emphasize Consumer Watchdog's opposition to HMO "bean counters" overriding doctors' decisions. Most of the legislative package later passed with the help of the California Nurses Association in November 1998.

As a result, California has the strongest HMO patient protection laws in America. Many of the provisions of California's bill were included in the national U.S. Patients' Bill of Rights act, which passed Congress in 2001.

In the 2000s, Consumer Watchdog worked to extend Proposition 103's rate protections to health insurance. After the California Legislature repeatedly rejected the legislation, the organization placed the proposal on the November 2014 ballot.

=== Energy Regulation ===
Rosenfield co-authored Proposition 9 in 1998, a ballot initiative to block aspects of the utility deregulation laws passed by California lawmakers in 1996.

Proposition 9 failed due to the $40 million lobbying efforts of the utility industry. Rosenfield claimed his re-regulation efforts could have helped deter the California Energy Crisis exploited by Enron and other energy companies in 2001. Rosenfield talks about the situation in the 2005 documentary, The Smartest Guys in the Room.

=== Litigation ===
Rosenfield is a lawyer in consumer protection lawsuits brought by Consumer Watchdog's legal team challenging abusive practices by companies in the insurance, health care, automobile, cell phone, and satellite television industries, as well as government agencies that violate laws. He also works with Consumer Watchdog in administrative and judicial proceedings to lower insurance rates and enforce Proposition 103.

== Consumer Education Foundation ==
Rosenfield serves as President of the Consumer Education Foundation. The group maintains "Where's Our Money?," a website that discusses the 2008 financial crisis.

== Works ==
Rosenfield wrote Silent Violence, Silent Death: The Hidden Epidemic of Medical Malpractice in 1994. The book was published by Essential Books and outlines the extent of the medical malpractice in the United States, and how consumers can protect themselves. He has written multiple newspaper articles and testified before Congress and many state legislatures on consumer protection.

== Awards ==
- Top 100 California Political Power Brokers by Capitol Weekly
- California Lawyer of the Year
- Top 100 Litigators in California by Los Angeles Daily Journal
- Honorary Doctorate of Humane Letters from Amherst College, 2010
- Speaking Truth to Power by the California Nurses Association

== Personal life ==
Rosenfield lives in Los Angeles, California with his wife, author Georgia Bragg. The couple have two children.

== See also ==
- Consumer Watchdog
- Jamie Court
- Ralph Nader
- John Simpson
