= Robert Klein (disambiguation) =

Robert Klein (born 1942) is an American comedian and actor.

Robert Klein may also refer to:

- Robert Klein (Medal of Honor) (1848–1931), United States Navy sailor
- Robert N. Klein II, property developer and stem cell advocate
- R. Martin Klein (born 1957), American voice actor
- Bob Klein (born 1947), American football tight end
- Robert Klein (gymnast) (1925–2000), German Olympic gymnast
- Robert G. Klein (born 1947), Justice of the Supreme Court of Hawaii

== See also ==
- Bob Cline (1933–2020), American politician
- Bob Kline (1909–1987), American baseball pitcher
- Robert Kleine (born 1941), State Treasurer of Michigan
