= California Proposition 14 =

California Proposition 14 may refer to three different and unrelated propositions proposed in California:

- 1964 California Proposition 14, concerning housing discrimination
- 2010 California Proposition 14, concerning the election system
- 2020 California Proposition 14, concerning biomedical research into embryonic stem cells
