= 2004 California elections =

- November 2, 2004
- Registered: 16,557,273
- Turnout: 76.04% (▲25.47 pp)

Elections were held in California on November 2, 2004. Primary elections were held on March 2. Up for election were all the seats of the State Assembly, 20 seats of the State Senate, and sixteen ballot measures.

== Federal offices ==
=== United States President ===
California had 55 electoral votes in the Electoral College. Democrat John Kerry won with 54% of the vote.

=== United States Senate ===
Incumbent Democrat senator Barbara Boxer won reelection.

=== United States House of Representatives ===
California has 53 congressional districts, electing 20 Republicans and 33 Democrats.

== California State Legislative elections ==
=== State Senate ===
There are 40 seats in the State Senate. For this election, candidates running in odd-numbered districts ran for four-year terms.

California State Senate - 2004	Seats
Democratic-Held	25
Republican-Held	15
2004 Elections
Democratic Held and Uncontested	15
Contested	19
Republican Held and Uncontested	6
Total	40

=== State Assembly ===
All 80 biennially elected seats of the State Assembly were up for election this year. Each seat has a two-year term. The Democrats retained control of the State Assembly.

California State Assembly - 2004	Seats
Democratic-Held	48
Republican-Held	32
2004 Elections
Democratic Incumbent and Uncontested	33
Contested, Open Seats	23
Republican Incumbent and Uncontested	24
Total	80

== Statewide ballot propositions ==
Sixteen ballot propositions qualified to be listed on the general election ballot in California. Nine of these measures were passed, whilst seven failed.

=== Proposition 1A ===
Proposition 1A would protect local funding and tax revenues for locally delivered services and prohibit the State from reducing local governments' property tax proceeds. Proposition 1A passed with 83.6% approval.

Proposition 1A results by county Yes: 80–90%; 70–80%

=== Proposition 59 ===
Proposition 59 would amend the Constitution to provide the public the right to access meetings of government bodies and writings of government officials. Proposition 59 passed with 83.3% approval.

Proposition 59 results by county Yes: 80–90%; 70–80%

=== Proposition 60 ===
Proposition 60 would provide the right for political parties participating in a primary election for partisan office to also participate in the general election for that office. Proposition 60 passed with 67.5% approval.

=== Proposition 60A ===
Proposition 60A would reserve proceeds from sale of surplus state property purchased with General Fund monies to payment of principal, interest on Economic Recovery Bonds approved in March 2004. Proposition 60A passed with 73.2% approval.

=== Proposition 61 ===
Proposition 61 authorizes $750 million in bonds for grants for construction, expansion, remodeling, renovation, furnishing and equipping children's hospitals. Proposition 61 passed with 58.3% approval.

=== Proposition 62 ===
Proposition 62 would allow voters to vote for any state or federal candidate, except for president, regardless of party registration of voter or candidate. Proposition 62 failed with 46.2% approval.

=== Proposition 63 ===
Proposition 63 would establish a 1% tax on taxable personal income above $1 million to fund expanded health services for the mentally ill. Proposition 63 passed with 53.7% approval.

=== Proposition 64 ===
Proposition 64 limits the ability for lawsuits to be filed, only allowing them if there was actual loss. Proposition 64 passed with 58.9% approval.

=== Proposition 65 ===
Proposition 65 would amend the constitution to allow for voter approval of reductions of local fee or tax revenues. Proposition 65 failed with 37.6% approval.

=== Proposition 66 ===
Proposition 66 would limit the three strikes law to violent and serious felonies, allow limited re-sentencing under new definitions, and increase punishment for child sex offenders. Proposition 66 failed with 47.3% approval.

Proposition 66 results by county No: 60–70%; 50–60%; Yes: 60–70%; 50–60%

=== Proposition 67 ===
Proposition 67 would amend the constitution to increase the telephone surcharge be increased and to allocate funds for emergency services. Proposition 67 failed with 28.4% approval.

Proposition 67 results by county No: 80–90%; 70–80%; 60–70%

=== Proposition 68 ===
Proposition 68 would amend the constitution to allow tribal compact amendments, allowing casino gaming for sixteen non-tribal establishments unless tribes accept. Proposition 68 failed with 16.2% approval.

Proposition 68 results by county No: 90–100%; 80–90%; 70–80%

=== Proposition 69 ===
Proposition 69 would require and provide funding for the collection of DNA samples from all felons with submission to the state DNA database. Proposition 69 passed with 62.0% approval.

Proposition 69 results by county Yes: 70–80%; 60–70%; 50–60%; No: 50–60%

=== Proposition 70 ===
Proposition 70 would require the Governor to execute a 99-year gaming compact upon tribe's request, and the tribe would contribute a percentage of its net gaming income to state funds in exchange for expanded, exclusive gaming. Proposition 70 failed with 23.7% approval.

Proposition 70 results by county No: 80–90%; 70–80%; 60–70%

=== Proposition 71 ===
Proposition 71 would establish the California Institute for Regenerative Medicine to regulate and fund stem-cell research, would establish a constitutional right to conduct stem-cell research, and would create a stem-cell research oversight committee. Proposition 71 passed with 59.1% approval.

=== Proposition 72 ===
Proposition 72 would require health care coverage for employees working for large and medium employers. Proposition 72 failed with 49.1% approval.

Proposition 72 results by county No: 70–80%; 60–70%; 50–60%; Yes: 60–70%; 50–60%

== See also ==
- California State Legislature
- California State Assembly
- California State Senate
- Districts in California
- Political party strength in U.S. states
- Political party strength in California
- Elections in California
