= 2006 California Proposition 87 =

California Proposition 87 was a proposition on the ballot for California voters for the November 7, 2006 general election, officially titled Alternative Energy. Research, Production, Incentives. Tax on California Oil Producers. It was rejected by the voters, 54.7% opposed to 45.3% in favor. This was highest-funded campaign on any state ballot and surpassing every campaign in the country in spending except the presidential contest.

The proposition would have established a "$4 billion program with goal to reduce petroleum consumption by 25%, with research and production incentives for alternative energy, alternative energy vehicles, energy efficient technologies, and for education and training", funded by a "tax of 1.5% to 6% (depending on oil price per barrel) on producers of oil extracted in California."

Proposition 87 results by county No: 70–80%; 60–70%; 50–60%; Yes: 70–80%; 60–70%; 50–60%

== Arguments in favor ==
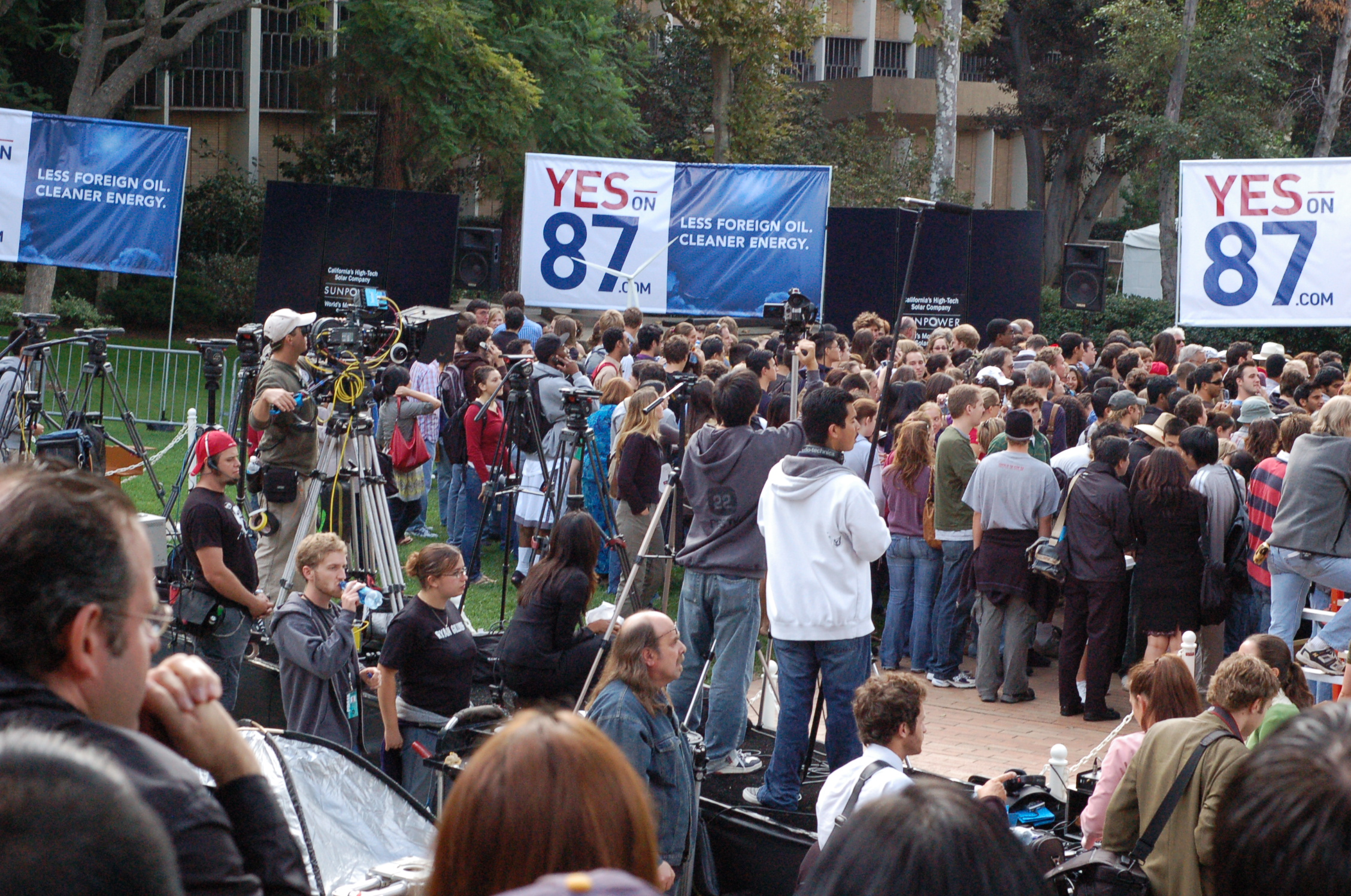
Rally at UCLA in support of the proposition

Proponents of 87 included Laura Keegan Bordeau, CEO of the American Lung Association of California, Winston Hickox, former Secretary of the California Environmental Protection Agency and Jamie Court, President of the Foundation for Taxpayer and Consumer Rights (now Consumer Watchdog (USA). The California Voter Information Guide for the 2006 election contained the following arguments in favor of passage of Proposition 87:

Passage of 87 will make the oil industry pay from their profits for their fair share of research into cleaner energy. It would also make the oil industry pay the same drilling fees as they pay in other states. The proposition would make it illegal for energy companies to pass the added costs on to consumers via increased gas prices. The passage of 87 would also create thousands of jobs and decrease American dependence on oil from Saudi Arabia and Iraq. Consumers would be able to receive rebates for purchasing alternative fuel vehicles and incentives for renewable energy sources resulting in cleaner air and improved health. The tax increase and oversight would be done without creating a new bureaucracy by utilizing an existing state agency.

Another pro 87 argument was that the, "tax will be essentially a tax on extracting oil in California. This tax exists in other states. Alaska drillers pay a 15% tax, Texas drillers pay a 4.6% tax and Louisiana drillers a 12.5% tax. This tax on the California drillers would only be between 1 - 6% depending on the price of a barrel of oil. California is the only large producing state in the US without such a tax." This tax would have been on exporters of oil in California and the language in the proposition prohibited the cost to be passed on to consumers.

Among those claimed to support Proposition 87 were doctors and nurses (the voter guide states "the Coalition for Clean Air and California doctors and nurses ALL SUPPORT"), Nobel Prize–winning scientists, environmental and consumer groups, educators, and labor and agriculture groups. The proponents of 87 point out that the campaign against 87 was funded by the oil industry.

Most of the "Yes on 87" campaign was funded by Steve Bing, a real estate developer, film producer, and philanthropist, who contributed US$39,058,000 as of October 23, 2006. Google co-founder Larry Page gave $1,000,000.

=== Endorsements in favor of 87 ===
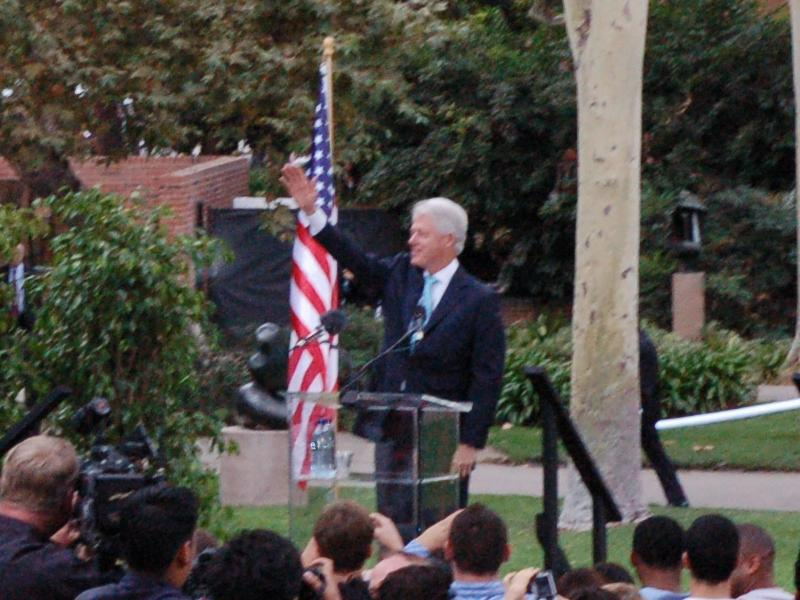
Bill Clinton speaking at UCLA rally in support of the proposition

Amongst Prop 87's supporters were former President Bill Clinton, former vice-president Al Gore, then-Senator Barack Obama, Nobel Prize–winning scientist Dr. Mario Molina, former Secretary of State Madeleine Albright, former U.N. Ambassador Richard Holbrooke, Senator Dianne Feinstein, Democratic gubernatorial nominee Phil Angelides, State Superintendent of Public Instruction Jack O'Connell, the American Lung Association of CA, the California League of Conservation Voters, the Coalition for Clean Air, Americans for Energy Independence, the Foundation for Taxpayer and Consumer Rights, and venture capitalist Vinod Khosla.

== Arguments against ==
Most of the No on 87 campaign was funded by petroleum companies, more than $95,000,000 in contributions was received for the No on 87 Campaign, Chevron Corporation ($30,000,000) and Aera Energy ($27,000,000), more than any other proposition in history. The majority of the remaining contributors opposed to 87 were other oil production companies.

Other opponents included Larry McCarthy, President of the California Taxpayers Association (Cal-Tax), Daniel Cunningham, President of the California Small Business Alliance, Marian Bergeson, Former President of the California School Board Association, Kevin R. Nida, President of the California Firefighters Association, Ray Holdsworth, Former Chair of the California Chamber of Commerce, and Allan Zaremberg, President of Californians Against Higher Taxes. In the California Voter Guide for the 2006 election, they propose the following arguments opposed to passage of Proposition 87.

Passage of 87 is not a tax on profits but is a tax on California oil production. This tax would make California's oil the highest taxes in the nation. This increased tax would reduce production in California resulting in more imported gas with its attendant increase in transportation and refining which could be lawfully passed on to consumers. 87 would result in 50 more political appointees with unlimited staff. No oversight or requirement on how the increased revenue be spent including an exemption from the guaranteed education funding that covers other taxes.

Dr. Philip Romero, former Chief Economist for the California Governor's Office was quoted as saying "Proposition 87 attempts a worthy goal, but does so in a counterproductive and costly manner. It would shrink California's oil supply, increase dependence on foreign oil, and result in higher gasoline prices."

=== Endorsements opposed to 87 ===
Incumbent Republican governor Arnold Schwarzenegger opposed it as well as Republican state senator Tom McClintock.
