= Jack Simpson =

Jack Simpson may refer to:

- Jack Simpson (footballer) (born 1996), English footballer
- Jack Simpson (politician) (1929–2015), Australian politician and footballer
- Jack Simpson (cricketer) (1920–1997), Irish cricketer
- Jack Simpson (golfer) (1859–1895), Scottish golfer
- John Simpson Kirkpatrick (1892–1915), Australian soldier who served as John (Jack) Simpson
- Jack Simpson (rugby league) Australian rugby league player from 1930s; killed in WW2
- Jack Simpson (racing driver) in 1973 NASCAR Winston Cup Series
- Jack Simpson (motorcyclist) from 1963 Grand Prix motorcycle racing season
- Jack Simpson (sailor) from 29er
- Jack Simpson (Prison Fellowship) from Reconciliation, Tolerance, and Unity Bill

== See also ==
- Jack Simpson Gymnasium, Calgary
- Jackie Simpson (disambiguation)
- John Simpson (disambiguation)
- Jock Simpson (1886–1959), English footballer
