= Robert N. Klein II =

American stem cell researcher

Robert Nicholas "Bob" Klein II is a stem cell advocate. He initiated California Proposition 71, which succeeded in establishing the California Institute for Regenerative Medicine, of which Klein was the chairman of the governing board.

Before getting involved in stem cell advocacy, he was a housing developer and lawyer. He lives in Portola Valley, California and works in Palo Alto, where he used to live.

== Stem cell advocacy ==
He was a chief author of Proposition 71 and was the chair of the Yes on 71 campaign. He donated $3 million to the cause, the largest donation, and ran the campaign from the Klein Financial Corporation.

After the election, Proposition 71 became Article XXXV of the California Constitution and the Yes on 71 campaign became the California Research and Cures Coalition, a stem cell advocacy organization. Klein was the head of that organization until he took the position at the California Institute for Regenerative Medicine, the organization created by the ballot initiative. In 2005, he was named as one of TIME Magazine's 100 Most Influential People; and, that same year Scientific American named Klein one of “The Scientific American 50” as a leader shaping the future of science. Klein was honored at the 2010 BIO International Convention as the second annual Biotech Humanitarian. Also, in 2010, Klein received the 2010 Research!America Gordon and Llura Gund Leadership Award for his advocacy of stem cell and diabetes research.

In 2020, the original funding for the Institute for Regenerative Medicine had run out, so Klein spearheaded another initiative to fund it, known as Proposition 14.

== Early career ==
Klein has a Bachelor of Arts in History with Honors from Stanford University and a Juris Doctor from Stanford University Law School, 1970. Additional education includes: Executive Summer Finance Program at Stanford University Business School and an internship with the United Nations Economic and Social Council in Switzerland on Economic Development Policy.

Soon after graduating law school, he joined the firm of William Glikbarg, a Southern California housing developer who also taught housing law at Stanford.

He made his multimillion-dollar fortune primarily in the Modesto area, of the Central Valley, CA, developing low-income housing. He included market-rate units within subsidized projects to help generate financing for projects.

When Nixon administration housing secretary George W. Romney ended public housing subsidies in January 1973, Klein and an associate, Michael J. BeVier, successfully persuaded the California legislature to create the California Housing Finance Agency, which subsidizes housing developments with low-interest bonds. (Klein did not use CHFA money in his real estate deals to eliminate the potential for a conflict of interest.) BeVier wrote about this in the book "Politics Backstage."

== Personal life ==
Robert lives in Portola Valley with his wife Danielle Guttman Klein, as well as her daughter Alyssa. He has two sons and a daughter: Robert, Jordan, and Lauren. Lauren and her husband, Daryl Baltazar have one son named Bennett. Robert cites his son Jordan's autoimmune-mediated (type 1) diabetes as a primary source of his involvement in stem cell research.

Klein's father Robert Klein Sr. (Harvard, UCLA) was an administrator of San Jose, Fresno, Santa Cruz and Menlo Park.

== See also ==
- Proposition 71
- California Institute for Regenerative Medicine
