= Consumer Watchdog =

US non-profit organization

- Formation: 1985; 41 years ago (as Foundation for Taxpayer and Consumer Rights)
- Type: non-profit
- Purpose: taxpayer and consumer advocacy
- Location(s): Santa Monica, California, U.S.
- Region served: United States
- President: Jamie Court
- Website: www.consumerwatchdog.org

Consumer Watchdog (formerly the Foundation for Taxpayer and Consumer Rights) is a US non-profit, progressive organization which advocates for taxpayer and consumer interests, with a focus on insurance, health care, political reform, privacy and energy.

The organization was founded in 1985 by California Proposition 103 author Harvey Rosenfield and is headquartered in Santa Monica, California. Its chief officers include President Jamie Court and Executive Director Carmen Balber.

== Early history ==
After lobbying with consumer advocate Ralph Nader on a number of issues including campaign finance reform and nuclear power proliferation, Rosenfield founded Consumer Watchdog in 1985.

Later, Rosenfield and Nader campaigned against California Proposition 51 (1986), an insurance-industry-backed initiative on the California ballot in 1986 that limited damage claims on lawsuits.

Though Proposition 51 passed, Rosenfield continued to work for insurance rate reductions at his newly formed public interest group. Rosenfield believed insurance regulation was the only solution to rising insurance rates in California. In response, Rosenfield drafted new insurance reform legislation, which insurance industry lobbyists defeated in the state capital.

== Issues ==
=== Insurance reform ===
==== Proposition 103 ====
In 1987, Rosenfield began to write a ballot box proposal to regulate California property and casualty insurance companies and formed a campaign to sponsor it called Voter Revolt. The proposal turned into insurance reform Proposition 103 and promised voters a minimum 20% rollback in rates for property, auto and other kinds of insurance. The measure required auto insurers to base auto insurance premiums primarily on a policyholder's driving safety record, annual mileage driven and years driving experience. Proposition 103 also made the California Insurance Commissioner an elected official, subjected insurers to California's antitrust laws, civil rights laws and unfair business competition law. It also included a provision for "intervenor fees," which has resulted in payments to Rosenfield and his organizations of more than $6 million.

Voter Revolt operated on a $2.9 million budget, a fraction of the insurance industry's $63 million lobbying and advertising effort. The insurance industry, fearing they would not be able to defeat Proposition 103, launched three competing initiative measures in an attempt to confuse voters.

To bring attention to his cause, Rosenfield used publicity stunts like having guards accompany him while he delivered the signatures that got Proposition 103 on the ballot. As well, the group attempted to deliver truckloads of cow manure to the headquarters of Farmers Insurance Group of Los Angeles.

Following this campaign, along with canvassing and the endorsement of Ralph Nader, the initiative was passed in November 1988. Since then, Consumer Watchdog has defended Proposition 103 from insurance industry challenges and ensured the proposition's implementation. In 2008, the Consumer Federation of America estimated that Proposition 103 had saved consumers over $62 billion since 1988.

However, critics of California Proposition 103 claim it is responsible for California's insurance crisis. In March 2024, the editorial board of the Orange County Register called for its repeal, saying "Prop. 103 didn't solve California's insurance problems, but made them worse. Time to cancel it."

Proposition 103's benefits to policyholders have been questioned by independent researchers, including the International Center for Law & Economics. Contrary to claims that Proposition 103 saved Californians as much as $154 billion in auto insurance premiums from 1989 to 2015, it found that Californians would have saved nearly $25 billion if they had not passed Proposition 103.

==== Proposition 17 ====
During 2010, Consumer Watchdog opposed Proposition 17, a ballot measure sponsored by Mercury Insurance Group to repeal a provision of Proposition 103 which prohibits insurance companies from considering a driver's history of prior insurance coverage when determining the price or availability of automobile insurance. Mercury spent $16 million in its effort, funding a group called Californians for Fair Automobile Insurance Rates. Consumer Watchdog argued that the measure would have allowed Mercury and other companies to impose surcharges on drivers who have not had continuous coverage. To raise awareness of the fact that an insurance company was sponsoring of Proposition 17, Consumer Watchdog sent a man in a chicken suit to legislative hearings on the measure. The group was outspent 12-to-1, but the measure was narrowly defeated on June 8, 2010.

=== Healthcare reform ===
==== HMO patients' rights ====
In 1994, during the Clinton healthcare debate, Consumer Watchdog created Californians for Quality Care and appointed Jamie Court to lead the campaign. In 1996, Consumer Watchdog worked to have the first Patients' Bill of Rights proposition in the US placed on the California ballot. However, Proposition 216 failed to pass, garnering only 38.7% of the vote.

In 1998, Consumer Watchdog advocated for legislation, ultimately signed into law by California Governor Gray Davis, to extend broad need rights to HMO patients. To bring attention to the issue, the group dumped a truck load of pinto beans at an HMO industry conference to emphasize Consumer Watchdog's opposition to HMO "bean counters" overriding doctors' decisions. Most of the legislative package later passed with the help of the California Nurses Association in November 1998.

Many of the provisions of California's bill were included in the national U.S. Patients' Bill of Rights act, which passed Congress in 2001.

==== Prescription drug costs ====
During the 2004 election, Consumer Watchdog chartered two private trains, which they called "the Rx Express", to take seniors to Canada to buy cheaper prescription medication. The group wanted to show how Americans pay about 60 percent more for prescription drugs than people in other countries.

The Rx Express train trips generated more than three hundred television appearances, with a Nielsen audience of 65 million, 60 newspaper articles, and 100 radio interviews.

The provision of prescription drug benefits to seniors became a central issue in the election and ultimately translated to an expansion of Medicare.

In 2009, Consumer Watchdog launched with Mayor Antonio Villaraigosa the LARx Prescriptions Savings Card Program, a citywide card program that provides discounts on all pharmaceutical medications and is open to all interested individuals with eligibility restrictions. Consumer Watchdog developed the program with the City of Los Angeles.

=== Energy regulation ===
In 1998, the group co-sponsored Proposition 9, a ballot initiative to block aspects of the utility deregulation laws passed by California lawmakers in 1996. Proposition 9 failed following a $40 million opposition campaign, funded largely by California's three major private utilities – Pacific Gas and Electric Company, Edison International and Sempra Energy. During the 2000-2001 California electricity crisis, Consumer Watchdog strongly opposed a proposed legislative bailout of the three major utilities. The legislature did not enact the proposed bailout.

The group also runs Oil Watchdog, a blog and resource library about the practices of the US oil industry. Leading up to the 2010 California elections, Oil Watchdog wrote a report exposing what they described as the profit motive of Valero Energy Corporation when it donated $5 million into a ballot initiative, which Consumer Watchdog asserted was aimed at undermining California's green energy industries. The group created a controversial video to expose the practices of Koch Industries, which it displayed in Times Square, New York.

=== Political reform ===
In 2003, Consumer Watchdog launched Arnold Watch to expose what they asserted to be Governor Arnold Schwarzenegger's ties to special interests. The group also targeted four Schwarzenegger-backed propositions on the ballot in a special election in 2005. These included California Proposition 74 (2005), which would have lengthened the time it takes for teachers to get tenure, California Proposition 75 (2005), which would have limited public employee unions' political spending, California Proposition 76 (2005), which would have limited California's spending and California Proposition 77 (2005), which the group asserted would have removed lawmakers ability to redistrict the state. All four propositions were defeated, which changed Schwarzenegger's governorship.

The group also helped expose what they asserted to be former Senate majority leader Bill Frist’s conflicts of interest. Frist, a doctor whose family controlled HCA, was then backing a Senate bill to limit legal accountability for doctors and hospitals when they commit medical malpractice. The group publicly demanded that Frist sell at least $25 million of stock he held in the company. At the time, HCA was one of America’s largest hospital companies and owner of HCI, the nation’s fifth biggest medical malpractice insurer.

=== Stem cell oversight ===
Consumer Watchdog created Stem Cell Oversight and Accountability Project to lobby for improved benefits to citizens of California from state funded stem cell research. As the Independent Citizen’s Oversight Committee debated the intellectual property rules of California Proposition 71 (2004), a successful 2004 ballot initiative that created $3 billion in general obligation bonds to fund stem cell research, Consumer Watchdog lobbied to have language put in the regulations that ensure any cures that result from the research be made available to underserved populations and that the state recoup a portion of the taxpayers' investment.

In 2006 Consumer Watchdog, through its attorney the Public Patent Foundation, also challenged three patents held by the Wisconsin Alumni Research Foundation (WARF) that cover fundamental stem cell lines and techniques. The patent office found that none of the patents could stand as they were, but WARF narrowed the claims of all three patents, and the resulting claims were upheld in 2008. Consumer Watchdog was able to appeal on only one of the patents, and it did so, and in 2010 the appeals board decided that the amended claims of the patent were not patentable. However, WARF was able to re-open prosecution of the case and did so, amending the claims again to make them more narrow, and in January 2013 the amended claims were allowed. In July 2013, Consumer Watchdog announced that it would appeal the decision to allow the claims of the '913 patent to the US Court of Appeals for the Federal Circuit (CAFC), the federal appeals court that hears patent cases. At a hearing in December 2013, the CAFC raised the question of whether Consumer Watchdog had legal standing to appeal; the case could not proceed until that issue was resolved.

=== Privacy ===
==== Financial privacy ====
Consumer Watchdog lobbied for financial privacy legislation in 2002. The legislation, which required consumers to opt in before financial services companies shared their personal information with other companies, had public support, but lawmakers wouldn’t move it forward. The group wanted to expose how much personal information was for sale on the Internet for a relatively cheap price. To prove their point, the group published the partial Social Security numbers of legislators opposed to financial privacy on his website. Following this campaign, and the signature gathering help of E-Loan's Chris Larsen, Governor Davis signed the "country's toughest financial privacy legislation."

==== Google and internet privacy ====
Consumer Watchdog has also campaigned for "do not track" rights. The consumer group was recognized by David Vladeck, the consumer protection chief at the U.S. Federal Trade Commission, during an online privacy conference on December 1, 2010 in Washington DC. That morning Vladeck announced that the FTC would recommend that every browser come equipped with a "do not track me" function that prevents companies from collecting data against the user's will.

Google later agreed to fix the privacy problems in its Chrome browser, which it claimed were inadvertent, as well as other, larger privacy changes. In November 2009 Google launched a dashboard offering consumers better knowledge of and control over their information on Google¹s various services. In January 2010 the company began offering SSL encryption using the HTTPS protocol as the default mode for its Gmail service. In May the company began offering an encrypted SSL connection for its search engine as an option. In 2011, Google entered into an overhaul of its privacy policies in a settlement with the FTC that addressed many of the privacy issues Consumer Watchdog has raised.

In 2010, to bring attention to Google's privacy issues, Consumer Watchdog checked networks in California Representative Jane Harman's home to see if her unencrypted Wi-Fi network might have been tapped when the company captured images for the Google Streetview service of Google Maps.

In the summer of 2010, the organization launched a video in Times Square portraying Google chief executive Eric Schmidt as an exploitative ice cream salesman. The cartoon led to criticism of Consumer Watchdog by some in the technology industry media. In 2011, the group created another video of Schmidt in an effort to get him to testify in front of Congress about what they asserted to be Google’s privacy issues.

Because of Consumer Watchdog's work, Google allegedly tried to influence the Rose Foundation to halt funding for Inside Google.

On June 19, 2015, Google announced it would remove links to nonconsensual pornography ("revenge porn") on request. Commentators noted that this was not the same thing as implementing a "right to be forgotten" as the company already has policies in place dealing with sensitive personal data such as social security numbers and credit card numbers. However, Consumer Watchdog subsequently called on Google to extend the right to be forgotten to U.S. users, filing a complaint with the Federal Trade Commission.
