= Jackie Simpson =

Jackie Simpson may refer to:

- Jackie Simpson (linebacker) (1936–1983), American football linebacker
- Jackie Simpson (defensive back) (1934–2017), American football defensive back
- Jackie Simpson (soccer) (born 1994), American soccer player

== See also ==
- Jack Simpson (disambiguation)
- John Simpson (disambiguation)
