= John Simpson (British nuclear physicist) =

British nuclear physicist

John Simpson FInstP
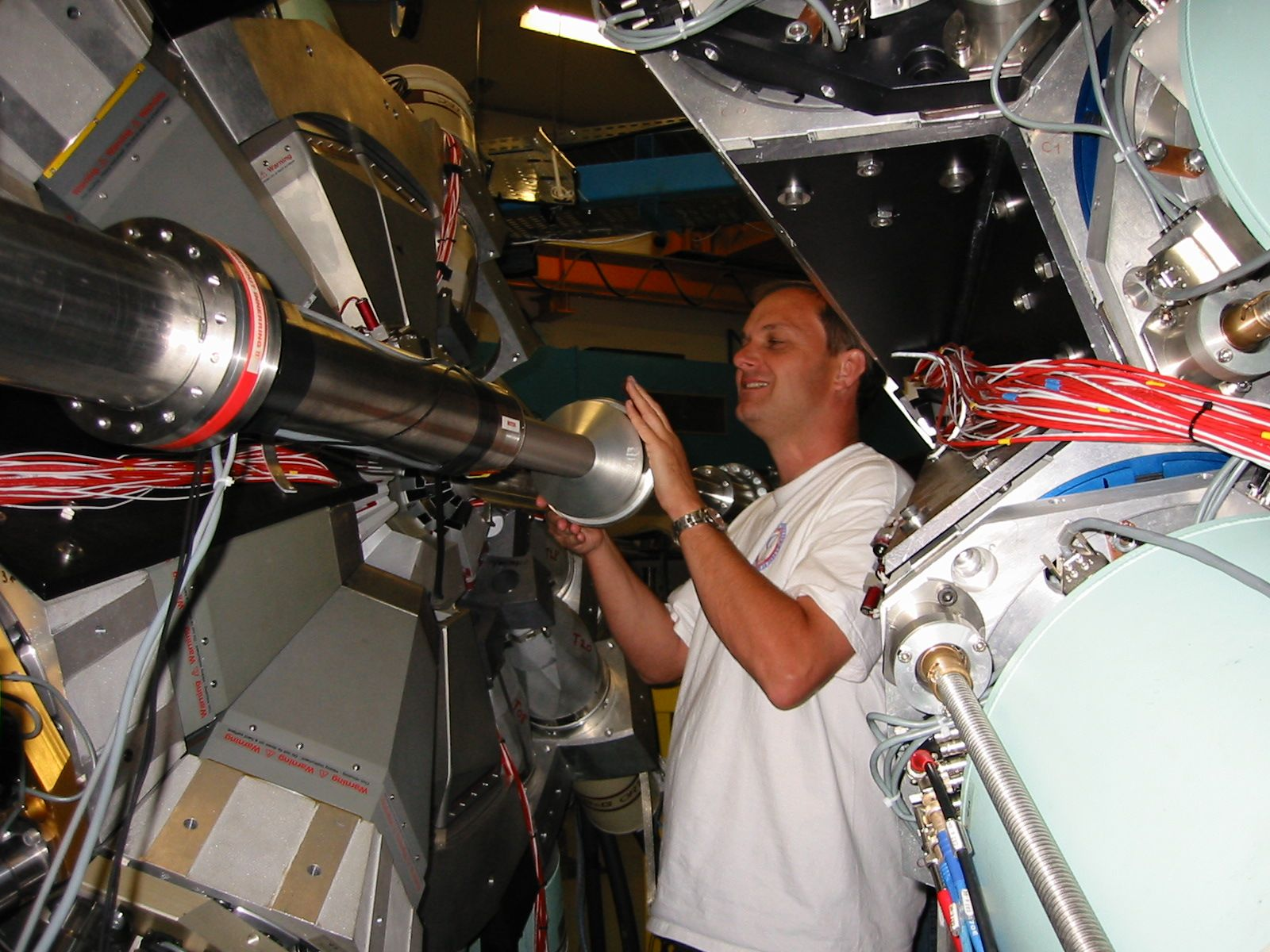
- British nuclear physicist John Simpson closing up the Euroball gamma-ray spectrometer target chamber
- Born: John Simpson; 23 March 1958 (age 68)
- Spouse: Linda Simpson
- Children: Andrew Simpson, Jayne Simpson & Richard Simpson
- Awards: Institute of Physics Ernest Rutherford Medal and Prize (2016)
- Scientific career
- Fields: Nuclear Physics
- Workplaces: Daresbury Laboratory; University of Liverpool
- Website: www.technologysi.stfc.ac.uk/Pages/John-Simpson.aspx

John Simpson FInstP (born 23 March 1958) is a British nuclear physicist. He is known for his work in gamma-ray spectroscopy and detector design. He was Head of Technology, Division of Technology Department. and was Head of the Nuclear Physics Group at STFC Daresbury Laboratory. He is a visiting professor of physics at the University of Liverpool.

== Biography ==
Simpson was educated at University of Liverpool (BSc(Hons) Physics Class 1, 1979) and the University of Liverpool (PhD, 1983).

In 2016, he was awarded the Ernest Rutherford Medal and Prize by the Institute of Physics. The award recognises distinguished research in nuclear physics or nuclear technology. The award citation reads, "For his outstanding leadership in the development of new detector technologies and systems for experimental nuclear physics research within the UK and Europe, and for his seminal contributions to our understanding of the structure of atomic nuclei, especially in revealing new properties of nuclei at the limits of angular momentum, deformation, and stability".

An invited Open Access comment to a special Physica Scripta Focus issue celebrating the 40-year anniversary of the 1975 Nobel Prize in Physics to Aage Bohr, Ben Roy Mottelson and Leo Rainwater edited by Jerzy Dudek, outlines selected highlights from experimental investigations at the Niels Bohr Institute, Denmark, and Daresbury Laboratory, UK, in the late 1970s and early 1980s, many of which have continued at other national laboratories in Europe and the US to the present day.
