= George Joseph (insurer) =

American businessman (1921–2026)

- Born: September 11, 1921; Beckley, West Virginia, U.S.
- Died: August 26, 2026 (aged 104)
- Education: Harvard University (BA)
- Occupation: Businessman in the insurance industry
- Known for: founder of Mercury General Corporation
- Children: 5

George Joseph (September 11, 1921 – August 26, 2026) was an American billionaire businessman who founded the general-line insurance firm Mercury General Corporation in Los Angeles.

== Early life and education ==
George Joseph was born in Beckley, West Virginia, on September 11, 1921, the son of Lebanese immigrants. His father worked as a coal-miner and storekeeper. He served in the United States Air Force as a B-17 navigator in World War II, serving in some 50 missions. In 1949, he earned a degree in Physics and Mathematics from Harvard University in three years on the G.I. Bill.

== Career ==
After he graduated, he took a job with the Occidental Life Insurance Company in Los Angeles, California as a systems analyst. In the evenings, he sold life insurance door-to-door. Noting that many of his customers would inquire about other lines of insurance (auto, property), Joseph proposed for Occidental to expand its offerings. After being rebuffed in 1954, he left Occidental and started his own insurance agency in California that bundled the life insurance policies he was already selling with property and casualty insurance and automobile insurance policies.

At the time, the automobile insurance industry was not flexible, with all drivers paying the same rate, regardless of their driving record or experience. Noting that, Joseph founded Mercury Insurance in 1962. Mercury offered auto insurance policies with differing rates, based on a driver's record and experience, a first in the industry. As of 2013, Mercury employs 4,000 agents and has $4 billion in assets.

Joseph remained actively involved in the operations of Mercury Insurance as the chairman of the board in later life.

== Political activities ==
Joseph was active in the opposition to California Proposition 103 which regulated providers of insurance to individuals in California. Proposition 103 requires insurance carriers to file rates and receive prior approval before using the rates, and required all insurance carriers to roll back rates 20%. Joseph fought to repeal parts of the law in 1993, based on the grounds that the law promoted increased litigation in the insurance industry and that the law restricted competitive actions by insurance carriers.

== Personal life and death ==
Joseph was listed in the Forbes billionaire's list, with an estimated net worth of US$2.5 billion, as of January 2026.

Joseph died on August 26, 2026, at the age of 104.
