= John Simpson (journalist/consumer advocate) =

American consumer rights advocate and former journalist (born 1948)

John M. Simpson
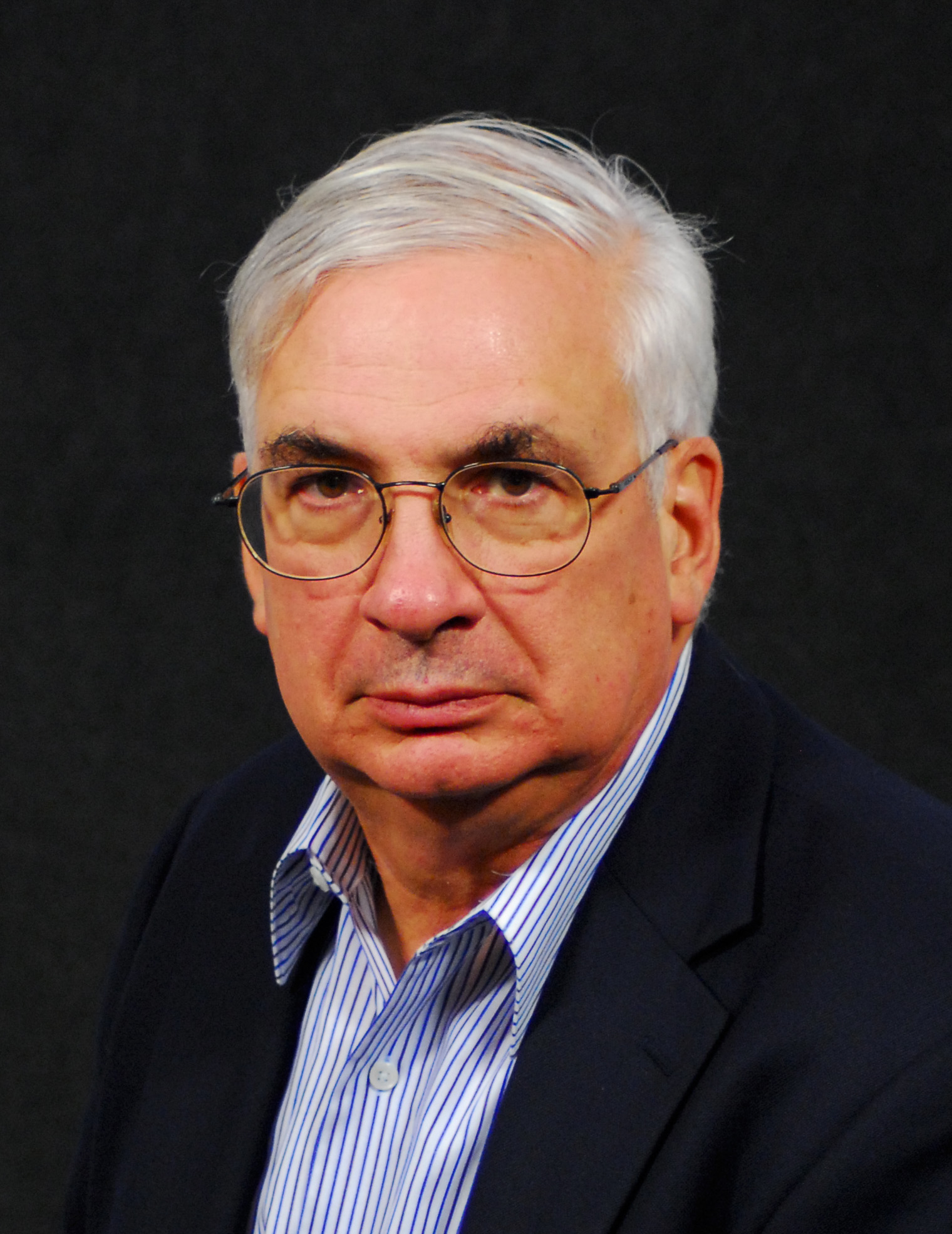
- Born: John M. Simpson; January 7, 1948 (age 78); Madison, Wisconsin, U.S.
- Education: SUNY Binghamton, B.A., 1969; USC, MA, 2006
- Occupations: Journalist, Consumer rights advocate
- Notable credit: USA Today
- Children: Two daughters
- Website: www.consumerwatch.org

John M. Simpson (born 1948) is an American consumer rights advocate and former journalist. Since 2005, he has worked for Consumer Watchdog, a nonpartisan nonprofit public interest group, as the lead researcher on Inside Google, the group's effort to educate the public about Google's dominance over the internet and the need for greater online privacy and as director of the organization's Stem Cell Oversight and Accountability Project to ensure that California’s stem cell program, created by Proposition 71, served the interest of voters.

== Background and early career ==
Simpson attended Harpur College of Arts and Sciences at SUNY Binghamton and earned a degree in philosophy.

Upon graduation, Simpson began working as a reporter for The Sun Bulletin, which was later acquired by Gannett Company, the largest U.S. newspaper publisher, where he worked for the next 30 years as a reporter and editor.

After working at the Gannett-owned Ithaca Journal and Pacific Daily News on Guam, Simpson eventually became the deputy editor of USA Today. Before joining USA Today, Simpson took a year's sabbatical from journalism as a Gannett Fellow at the University of Hawaii's Center for Asian and Pacific Studies. He was the founding managing editor of USA Today's international edition, launched in 1984.

In 1999, Simpson left USA Today when a new top editor eliminated the position of deputy editor. He then taught journalism at Dublin City University in Ireland. While in Ireland he consulted for The Irish Times and The Gleaner, Jamaica's oldest newspaper. After a year abroad, Simpson returned to the United States and became executive editor of Tribune Media Services International, a syndication company owned by the Tribune Company. He worked in that position in the company's Los Angeles office from 2001 until 2004, when Tribune closed its West Coast syndicate operation. He then entered graduate school and earned a master's degree in communication management from the Annenberg School for Communication at the University of Southern California.

Simpson has also served as the president of the World Editors' Forum. He also was Treasurer of the Inter American Press Association, Chairman of the American Society of Newspaper Editors International Communication Committee, and a Member of the World Press Freedom Committee’s Executive Committee.

== Consumer Watchdog ==
After reading a Consumer Watchdog job advertisement for a "hell raiser", Simpson decided to begin a second career as a consumer advocate in 2005.

=== Stem Cell Oversight and Accountability Project ===
In December 2005, Simpson was named director of Consumer Watchdog's Stem Cell Oversight and Accountability Project. Consumer Watchdog created the project to ensure that citizens of California reaped the benefits of state funded stem cell research. As the Independent Citizen’s Oversight Committee hashed out the intellectual property rules of Proposition 71, a successful 2004 ballot initiative that created $3 billion in general obligation bonds to fund stem cell research, Simpson pushed to have language put in the regulations that ensure any cures that result from the research be made available to underserved populations and that the state recoup a portion of the taxpayers' investment.

Simpson and his team, along with the Public Patent Foundation, also challenged patents held by the Wisconsin Alumni Research Foundation (WARF) on the grounds that the patents stymied research.

During the investigation, Simpson described the patent's effects: “under the patent, if any scientist used human embryonic stem cells in any way, he or she owed WARF a royalty, and that is just so outrageous and so detrimental to scientific research in the field.”

The groups' efforts resulted in the United States Patent and Trademark Office revoking two of WARF's patents, though they were later modified and re-instated. Third was rejected, but that decision is being appealed by WARF. After the challenge was filed, WARF substantially eased licensing requirements, making stem cells more readily available for researchers.

=== Inside Google ===
In 2008, Simpson began working for Consumer Watchdog's Inside Google. Funded by the Rose Foundation, Inside Google's goal is to educate the general public "about the need for greater online privacy, and to hold Google accountable for tracking consumers online without explicit permission and for exhibiting its monopolistic power in dangerous ways."

Simpson travels frequently to Washington DC to meet with lawmakers, journalists, lobbyists and regulatory agencies to discuss Google's business practices and expanding influence over the internet.

During consideration of the Google Books settlement agreement in 2008, Simpson testified to members of the United States Congress with regards to competition and privacy concerns.

In 2010, to bring attention to Google's privacy issues, Consumer Watchdog checked networks in California Representative Jane Harman's home to see if her unencrypted Wi-Fi network might have been tapped when the company captured images for the Google Streetview service of Google Maps.

Simpson believes Google's actions are "one of the biggest wire-tapping scandals in U.S. history."

Because of Consumer Watchdog's work, Google allegedly tried to influence the Rose Foundation to halt funding for Inside Google.

== Personal ==
Simpson resides in Redondo Beach, California with his wife, the former Carol R. Flaker. The couple have two grown children, Kate and Alexis.
