= 2004 California Proposition 71 =

Referendum on stem cell research

Proposition 71 of 2004 (or the California Stem Cell Research and Cures Act) is a law enacted by California voters to support stem cell research in the state. It was proposed by means of the initiative process and approved in the 2004 state elections on November 2. The Act amended both the Constitution of California and the Health and Safety Code.

The Act makes conducting stem cell research a state constitutional right. It authorizes the sale of general obligation bonds to allocate three billion dollars over a period of ten years to stem cell research and research facilities. Although the funds could be used to finance all kinds of stem cell research, it gives priority to human embryonic stem cell research.

Proposition 71 created the California Institute for Regenerative Medicine (CIRM), which is in charge of making "grants and loans for stem cell research, for research facilities, and for other vital research opportunities to realize therapies" as well as establishing "the appropriate regulatory standards of oversight bodies for research and facilities development". The Act also establishes a governing body called the Independent Citizen's Oversight Committee (ICOC) to oversee CIRM.

Proposition 71 is unique in at least three ways. Firstly, it uses general obligation bonds, which are usually used to finance brick-and-mortar projects such as bridges or hospitals, to fund scientific research. Secondly, by funding scientific research on such a large scale, California is taking on a role that is typically fulfilled by the U.S. federal government. Thirdly, Proposition 71 establishes the state constitutional right to conduct stem cell research. The initiative also represents a unique instance where the public directly decided to fund scientific research.

By 2020, the funding from proposition 71 was mostly used, and so the California Institute for Regenerative Medicine expected to shut down if it did not receive additional funding. For that reason, another ballot initiative was initiated as part of the 2020 California elections. This initiative, known as Proposition 14, aimed to authorize $5.5 billion in state general authorization bonds to fund the stem cell research at the California Institute for Regenerative Medicine. The initiative passed with 51% of the vote.

Proposition 71 results by county Yes: 70–80%; 60–70%; 50–60%; No: 60–70%; 50–60%

== Provisions ==
Proposition 71 states that "This measure shall be known as the California Stem Cell Research and Cures Act". That is therefore the official citation. However, the measure is also headed as the California Stem Cell Research and Cures Initiative. The Act is long and complex. It amends the state constitution by adding "Article 35 – Medical Research". This article establishes the CIRM and guarantees a right to conduct stem cell research. Proposition 71 also amends the Health and Safety Code, by introducing a provision in Part 5 of Division 106 called "Chapter 3 – California Stem Cell Research and Cures Bond Act". This chapter, among other provisions, establishes the ICOC.

== The new institute ==
=== ICOC membership ===
- (5 members) the chancellors of University of California at San Francisco, Davis, San Diego, Los Angeles, and Irvine.
- (12 members) the Governor, the Lieutenant Governor, the Treasurer, and the Controller each appoints a member from each of the following three categories:
  - A California university, excluding the ones mentioned above.
  - A California nonprofit academic and research institution that is not part of the University of California.
  - A California life science commercial entity that is not actively engaged in researching or developing therapies with pluripotent or progenitor stem cells.
- (2 members) the Governor appoints two members, each from the following disease advocacy groups: Alzheimer's and spinal cord injury.
- (2 members) the Lieutenant Governor appoints two members, each from the following disease advocacy groups: type II diabetes and multiple sclerosis, or amyotrophic lateral sclerosis.
- (2 members) the Treasurer appoints two members, each from the following disease advocacy groups: type I diabetes and heart disease.
- (2 members) the Controller appoints two members, each from the following disease advocacy groups: cancer and Parkinson's disease.
- (1 member) the Speaker of the Assembly appoints a member from a mental health disease advocacy group.
- (1 member) the President pro Tempore of the Senate appoints a member from an HIV/AIDS disease advocacy group.
- (2 members) A chairperson and vice chairperson who shall be elected by the ICOC members.

=== CIRM membership ===
CIRM may have up to 50 employees, who are exempt from civil service. CIRM is divided in three working groups.

- Scientific and Medical Research Funding Working Group; has 23 members:
  - Seven ICOC patient advocates who must be from California.
  - Fifteen stem-cell experts who cannot be from California.
  - The ICOC chair.
- Scientific and Medical Accountability Standards Working Group; has 19 members:
  - Five ICOC patient advocates who must be from California.
  - Nine stem-cell experts.
  - Four ethicists.
  - The ICOC chair.
- Scientific and Medical Research Facilities Working Group; has 11 members:
  - Six members from the Research Funding Work Group.
  - Four real estate specialists who must be from California.
  - The ICOC chair

== Background ==
Human embryonic stem cell research became a public issue in 1998 when two teams of scientists developed "methods for culturing cell lines derived, respectively, from: (1) cells taken from the inner cell mass of early embryos, and (2) the gonadal ridges of aborted fetuses". Since then, this type of research has sparked intense controversy in the United States.

Ever since 1996, Congress has attached to the Health and Human Services appropriations bill (which regulates the funding for the National Institutes of Health) a provision known as the "Dickey–Wicker Amendment". This amendment, named after the former representative Jay Dickey, Republican from Arkansas, prohibits the use of federal monies to fund "research that destroys or seriously endangers human embryos, or creates them for research purposes".

In 1999, however, the General Counsel of the Department of Health and Human Services issued a legal opinion arguing, "that the wording of the law might permit an interpretation under which human embryonic stem cell research could be funded". This interpretation stipulated that the government could fund this research so long as the embryos used had been destroyed by researchers privately paid. Although the Clinton administration adopted this interpretation and wrote the corresponding guidelines, it did not have the time to enforce them. The issue would pass on to the next administration.

On August 9, 2001, President George W. Bush announced his administration's policy regarding human embryonic stem cell research. The President opted to fund only research on the existing 60 cell lines. The small number of cell lines quoted by the President surprised many scientists. Furthermore, they were concerned about the availability and quality of these lines. Scientists also worried about the impact the president's policy could have on the American research community. The United States, they argued, lags behind other countries where governments support stem cell research. This, in turn, could cause American scientists to move to these countries.

Proposition 71 represents a response to the federal policy. The idea for this proposition came about after the California legislature blocked a billion-dollar measure to fund stem cell research. Robert N. Klein II, a real-estate developer from Palo Alto, whose son suffers from diabetes and whose mother has Alzheimer's, became the leader of the campaign effort to pass Proposition 71, and spent three million dollars of his own money in the campaign.

== Campaign ==
=== Proponents ===
The Coalition for Stem Cell Research and Cures comprised a broad group of people and organizations that included: 22 Nobel laureates; celebrities such as Christopher Reeve, Sharyn Rossi, Monica Siegenthaler, Brad Pitt, Saba Motakef, and Michael J. Fox; a number of elected officials such as State Treasurer Phil Angelides, and State Controller Steve Westly, and State Senator Deborah Ortiz; more than fifty patient and disease advocacy groups (e.g., Juvenile Diabetes Research Foundation, Alzheimer's Association California Council, Sickle Cell Disease Foundation of California), medical groups and hospitals (e.g., California Medical Association, Children's Hospital-Los Angeles), groups representing Latinos and African Americans (e.g. National Coalition of Hispanic Organization, California NAACP), women's advocacy groups (e.g., Planned Parenthood, California NOW) and faith-based organizations (e.g. Catholics for a Free Choice).

The Republican Party opposed this initiative, but two key Republican figures endorsed it. They were George P. Shultz, the U.S. Secretary of State in the Reagan Administration and California Governor Arnold Schwarzenegger. Although Schwarzenegger did not endorse it until October 18, 2004, his support may have helped to solidify the proposition's lead in the polls.

This campaign raised approximately $25 million. The contributors included such prominent figures as Bill Gates, who donated $400,000; Pierre M. and Pamela Omidyar, the founders of eBay who together gave $1 million; Gordon Gund, the owner of the Cleveland Cavaliers basketball team, who contributed $1 million; Herbert M. Sandler, chairman of the board of World Savings Bank, who gave $500,000; John Doerr, a Silicon Valley venture capitalist, who donated $2 million; and William Bowes Jr., a founder of Amgen (a biotech company), who gave $600,000.

=== Opposition ===
Those who opposed Proposition 71 included the Roman Catholic Church, Orange County Republicans, and the California Pro-Life Council, an affiliate of the National Right to Life Committee. Among the politicians in this group were State Senator Tom McClintock (R-Thousand Oaks) and Orange County Treasurer-Tax Collector John Moorlach. The Hollywood actor Mel Gibson also joined the efforts to defeat this initiative. Conservative groups, however, were not the only ones opposing Prop. 71; organizations such as the California Nurses Association (CNA), the Green Party, the Center for Genetics and Society, Our Bodies Ourselves, among others, were also against the initiative.

Two prominent groups campaigning to defeat the initiative were the Pro-Choice Alliance Against Proposition 71 and Doctors, Patients, and Taxpayers for Fiscal Responsibility. These two groups lacked the wide range of endorsements that the proponents had (however, the Pro-Choice Alliance Against Proposition 71 was endorsed by seven organizations and a number of university professors). On the Doctors, Patients, and Taxpayers for Fiscal Responsibility website (which no longer exists) there were only fourteen members listed. Among these members were Dr. Vincent Fortanasce, a physician; Diane Beeson, a medical sociologists; Carol Hogan, a spokesperson for the California Catholic Bishops; and Dr. H Rex Greene, an oncologist and hospital administrator.

The four organizations campaigning against the initiative raised almost $400,000. The main contributors were the United States Conference of Catholic Bishops, which donated $50,000 and Howard Ahmanson Jr., founder and president of Fieldstead & Company, who gave $95,000.

=== Analysis ===
Initial analysis and discussion of need for analysis was done in 2007

Sociologist Ruha Benjamin offers the first in-depth analysis of Proposition 71 in People's Science: Bodies and Rights on the Stem Cell Frontier (Stanford University Press 2013). Too frequently the debate over stem cell research devolves in to simple judgments—good or bad, life-saving medicine or bioethical nightmare, symbol of human ingenuity or our fall from grace—ignoring the people affected. Benjamin moves the terms of debate to focus on the shifting relationship between science and society, on the people who benefit—or don't—from Proposition 71 and what this says about democratic commitments to an equitable society. Benjamin discusses issues of race, disability, gender, and socio-economic class that serve to define certain groups as more or less deserving in their political aims and biomedical hopes.

== Results of vote ==

Proposition 71
Choice	Votes	%
For	7,018,059	59.05
Against	4,867,090	40.95
Total	11,885,149	100.00
Valid votes	11,885,149	94.40
Invalid/blank votes	704,534	5.60
Total votes	12,589,683	100.00
Registered voters/turnout	16,557,273	76.04
