= 2020 California Proposition 14 =

Authorizes bonds for funding stem cell research

Proposition 14
- November 3, 2020
- Authorizes Bonds Continuing Stem Cell Research

Results
Choice	Votes	%
Yes	8,588,618	51.09%
No	8,222,154	48.91%
County results
For
60%–70%
50%–60%
Against
70%–80%
60%–70%
50%–60%

California Proposition 14 is a citizen-initiated ballot measure that appeared on the ballot in the 2020 California elections, for November 3, 2020. It authorizes state bonds to be issued worth $5.5 billion, which will fund the California Institute for Regenerative Medicine (CIRM), which serves as the state's center for stem cell research, and enable it to continue its operations. This measure passed with 51% of the vote.

== Background ==
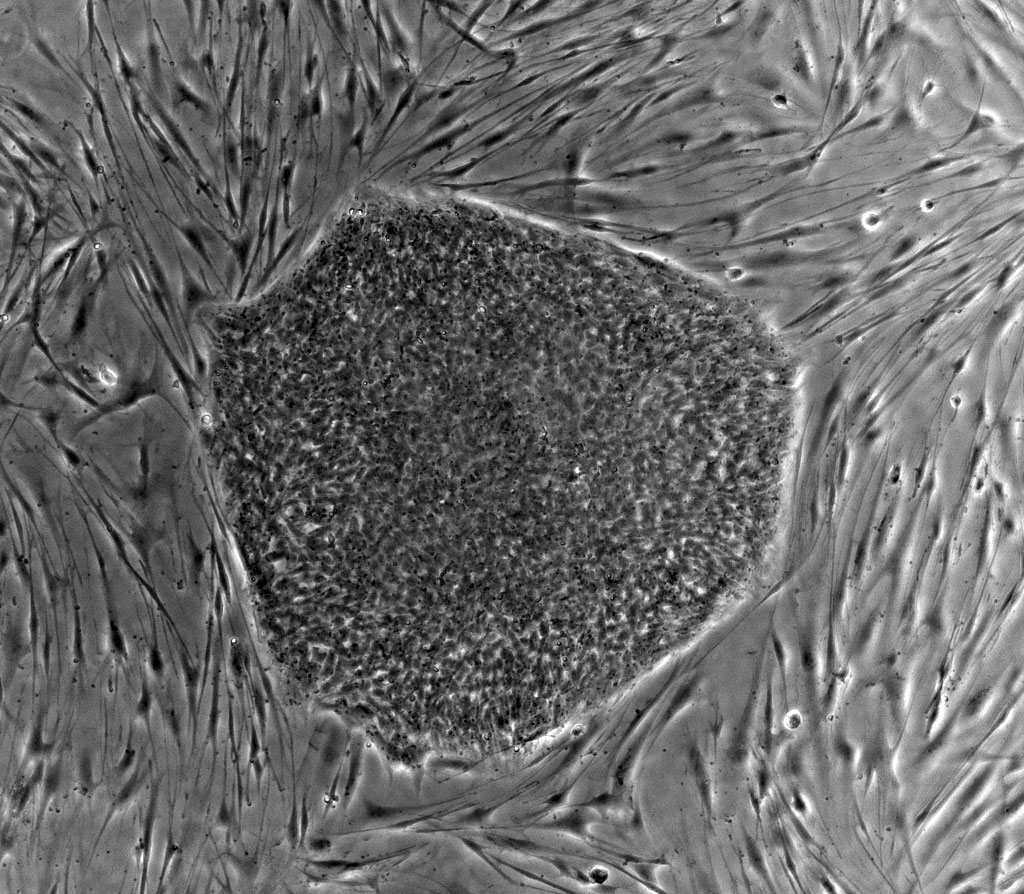

Robert N. Klein II, motivated by the suffering of family members from autoimmune diseases, launched a citizen initiative known as Proposition 71 in 2004, which created a state-funded center for stem cell research - the California Institute for Regenerative Medicine (CIRM). Based in San Francisco, the CIRM is responsible for with making grants and loans to stem cell research initiatives focused on developing treatment methods and completing research for clinical trials. Proposition 71 was approved by 59% of California voters and authorized $3 billion in bonds to fund the CIRM in addition to creating a Governing Board of 29 members as an Independent Citizens' Oversight Committee (ICOC). By 2020, $2.75 billion of the original $3 billion has been used or earmarked for funding of basic research, infrastructure, education, and clinical translational studies. For this reason, Klein spearheaded this initiative to authorize an additional $5.5 billion in bonds for the CIRM to support additional grants and operations under Proposition 14. Research areas of focus at CIRM include stem cell based research to mitigate or cure serious illness and chronic diseases such as cancer, heart disease, kidney disease, respiratory illnesses including COVID-19, diabetes, cancer, HIV/AIDs, paralysis, blindness, and more. A dedicated $1.5 billion under funding from Proposition 14 will be dedicated to research of diseases specific to the central nervous system and brain, including cancer, autism, dementia, Parkinson's and Alzheimers' disease.

Changes to the CIRM program and governance proposed in Proposition 14 include increased focus in improving patient access to stem cell treatments by expanding sites and facilities for human trials, the requirement for income earned from CIRM agreements to reduce the cost of stem cell treatments for patients, increase the ICOC from 29 members to 35 members, and to hire 15 full-time employees whose roles are dedicated to improving patient access to stem cell-derived therapeutics and treatments. Further, proposition 14 stipulates $1.5 billion to be spent researching brain and nervous system diseases, including dementia and Parkinson's disease. Estimated fiscal impact of Proposition 14 would include the initial $5.5 billion in bonds and $2.5 billion in interest, for an overall annual debt payment of $310 million over 25 years. Proposition 14 appropriates money from the general fund in order to fully pay the bond debt service.

== Support ==
In addition to Klein, this measure is supported by the Regents of the University of California. It was also endorsed by governor Gavin Newsom and The Modesto Bee.

Proponents argue that biomedical research is crucial, particularly in light of the COVID-19 pandemic. Proponents of Proposition 14 have raised more than $13.4 million in campaign funds.

== Opposition ==
As with Proposition 71, opposition to Proposition 14 includes many across the political spectrum including the Bakersfield Californian, California Nurses Association, California Catholic Conference, California Republican Party, Center for Genetics and Society, Friends Committee on Legislation of California, Green Party of California, Howard Jarvis Taxpayers Association, Libertarian Party of California, Los Angeles Times, Orange County Register, Peace and Freedom Party, Right to Life of Central California, San Bernardino Sun, San Francisco Chronicle, San Jose Mercury News, Scholl Institute of Bioethics, and CIRM board member Jeff Sheehy.

However, there was no significant organized opposition to Proposition 14, and the "No on Proposition 14" committee raised only $250.
