= California Institute for Regenerative Medicine =

Research institute in California, United States

Coordinates: 37°46′40.65″N 122°23′33.09″W

The California Institute for Regenerative Medicine (CIRM) is a state agency that supports research and education in the fields of stem cell and gene therapies. It was created in 2004 after 59% of California voters approved California Proposition 71: the Research and Cures Initiative, which allocated $3 billion to fund stem cell research in California. In 2020 voters approved Proposition 14 that allocated additional funds to CIRM.

CIRM supports research and training at many stem cell institutes throughout California, including Sanford Consortium, University of California, Santa Cruz, Stanford University, University of California Davis, University of California Irvine, University of California San Francisco, University of California Los Angeles and University of Southern California. In addition, it has supported the establishment of nine "Alpha Stem Cell Clinics" that lead clinical trials for stem cell therapies at City of Hope, University of California San Diego, University of California San Francisco, University of California Davis, a joint clinic at University of California Los Angeles and University of California Irvine, Cedars Sinai, Stanford, and USC/Children's Hospital Los Angeles.

== History ==
CIRM was established via California Proposition 71 (2004). However, its implementation was delayed when out-of-state based opponents incorporated in California to file two lawsuits that challenged the proposition's constitutionality. Opponents argued that the initiative created a taxpayer-funded entity not under state control, that the Independent Citizen's Oversight Committee (ICOC) had a conflict of interest with representatives being eligible for grant money, and that the initiative violated the single-subject requirement of initiatives by funding areas beyond stem cell research. In May 2007, the Supreme Court of California declined to review the two lower court decisions, thereby upholding Proposition 71 as constitutional and permitting CIRM to fund stem cell research in California.

Examples of CIRM funding include:

- In 2019, CIRM awarded a $6.5 million grant to Rocket Pharmaceuticals to support the clinical development of KRESLADI, a gene therapy for Leukocyte Adhesion Deficiency-I (LAD-1). KRESLADI was approved for medical use in the United States in March 2026, making it the first CIRM-funded therapy to be approved by the FDA.
- In 2018, UC San Francisco (UCSF) received a $12 million grant to study severe combined immunodeficiency (SCID). The research UCSF was able to conduct due to the funding the institution received contributed in part to a potential cure in 2019, described in a study published in the New England Journal of Medicine: "Lentiviral Gene Therapy Combined with Low-Dose Busulfan in Infants with SCID-X1".
- In 2017, CIRM awarded $2 million to a University of California San Diego scientist searching for a cure for Zika fever. Research resulted in successfully finding a pre-approved drug to block Zika virus replication and infection, as well as transmission from mother to child.
- In 2011, CIRM awarded $25 million to support a spinal cord injury trial – the first award dedicated to a human clinical trial – to Geron Corporation, which was later taken up by Asterias Biotherapeutics. The clinical trial led to significant benefits to a paralyzed high school student, Jake Javier, who was able to regain function in his upper body.

In late 2019, CIRM had awarded more than $2.67 billion in grant funding across six broad categories: physical and institutional infrastructure, basic research, education and training, research translation, research application and clinical trials.

The $3 billion initially provided to CIRM through Proposition 71 was budgeted to last until 2017. In February 2014, Robert Klein, a leader in the initial campaign for Proposition 71 and former CIRM Board Chair, presented a proposal at the UC San Diego Moores Cancer Center to extend CIRM funding. Another option discussed at that time was for CIRM to become a private, non-profit organization that would rely solely on outside funding.

In 2020, as CIRM's funding from the 2004 Proposition 71 was expiring, another ballot measure, Proposition 14, was advanced in California to add an additional $5.5 billion to CIRM, to enable it to continue its mission. The measure passed with 51% of the vote, and so the CIRM will continue operating.

== Oversight ==
The CIRM Board is composed of members appointed by elected state officers, including the Governor, Lt. Governor, the State Treasurer, the Controller, the Speaker of the California State Assembly, and the President pro tempore of the California State Senate. Only one member shall be appointed from a single university, institution, or entity.

The most recent 2018 audit found CIRM has a collaborative, engaged and performance-oriented culture, is patient-centered and has improved processes to be more efficient and effective since the implementation of CIRM 2.0.

In 2008 the Little Hoover Commission evaluated CIRM at the request of California Senators Sheila Kuehl and George Runner. The Commission commented specifically on the structure of the CIRM governance board and the need for greater transparency and accountability. The Commission provided suggestions on how to improve the structure and enhance the functioning of the CIRM board some of which included: decreasing the size of the ICOC from 29 to 15 members with four having no affiliations with CIRM-funded organizations; allowing board members to serve a maximum of four years; and eliminating the overlapping responsibilities of the agency chair and the board president. In addition, the Commission recommended that CIRM also allow outside experts to evaluate grant proposals.

California Senator Dean Florez, Little Hoover Commission member and State Senate Majority leader at the time, was not satisfied with the report, highlighting several concerns in a letter to the Little Hoover Commission, stating: “I am concerned about the Commission's apparent rush to conclude its report. As one member said at the meeting, five minutes and a sandwich is not adequate time for Commission members to absorb the information that was presented. While I appreciate the substantial effort that Commission members and staff put into drafting the report, I am concerned that due to its rush to approve the report, the Commission gave disproportionate weight to CIRM's critics and did not consider a broader range of views on the complex issues that are the subject of the report.”

A 2008 “Review Of Conflict-Of-Interest Policies, Grant Administration, Administrative Expenses, And Expenditures,” by the State Controller's office, which examined 18 straight months of the agency's operations, found that “CIRM has extensive conflict-of-interest policies and processes that are modeled after and, in some instances, go beyond National Institute of Health requirements. Our conclusion is consistent with the Bureau of State Audits in its audit report of CIRM issued in February 2007.”

In December 2012, the Institute of Medicine (IOM) released a report, “The California Institute for Regenerative Medicine: Science, Governance, and the Pursuit of Cures”, that evaluated CIRM programs and operations since its start in 2004. The IOM committee made recommendations similar to those made in the Little Hoover Commission. In general, the IOM recommended that the ICOC separate their responsibilities as executor and overseer and noted potential conflicts of interest among the CIRM board members. Several active CIRM board members also represented organizations that currently received or benefited from CIRM grants. The IOM committee also recommended that CIRM organize a single Scientific Advisory Board with experts in stem cell biology and cell-based therapies.

In 2014 the integrity of CIRM's grant review process was challenged, after CIRM awarded a Stanford-led consortium $40 million stem cell genomics award, making it the largest CIRM research grant. In February 2013, CIRM reviewers evaluated applications for genomics awards but, for the first time, declined to send any grant proposals to the board for a final decision. Comments were sent back to the researchers and re-submissions were accepted in fall 2013. During the fall 2013 review, CIRM reviewers sent all four genomic award proposals to the CIRM board, recommending that all four projects receive funding despite the projects exceeding the budget of $40 million. The CIRM President, Alan Trounson, became involved in the selection process and the final decision was to fund the Stanford project only, totaling $40 million. The CIRM grant review and scoring process and the role of President Trounson have been questioned, especially by those that did not receive funding like Jeanne Loring from the stem cell program at Scripps Research Institute.
