= Mercury General =

American insurance organization

- Type: Public
- Traded as: NYSE: MCY; S&P 600 Component
- Industry: Insurance
- Founded: 1960
- Headquarters: 4484 Wilshire Boulevard; Los Angeles, California
- Key people: Gabriel Tirador (CEO, Chairman & President); George Joseph (Founder)
- Revenue: US$5.992 billion (2025)
- Operating income: US$663.649 million (2025; income before income taxes)
- Net income: US$541.094 million (2025)
- Total assets: US$9.561 billion (2025)
- Total equity: US$2.417 billion (2025)
- Owner: George Joseph and family (35.3%)
- Number of employees: 4,300 (2017)
- Website: www.mercuryinsurance.com

Mercury General Corporation is a multiple-line insurance organization that offers personal automobiles, homeowners, renters, and business insurance. Mercury's primary focus is automobiles and homeowners' insurance.

Founded in 1961 and located in Los Angeles, Mercury has assets of over $4 billion, employs 4,500 people and more than 8,000 independent agents in Arizona, California, Florida, Georgia, Illinois, Nevada, New Jersey, New York, Oklahoma, Texas, and Virginia.

== History ==
Mercury was founded by George Joseph, who flew 50 World War II missions as a navigator before graduating from Harvard on the G.I. Bill in 1949. Joseph then spent more than a decade in the insurance industry before founding Mercury Insurance in 1961 as a low-cost alternative to larger insurance companies.

Mercury's California expansion began in 1964 with the opening of its first Orange County office. Two years later, the company spread into the San Fernando Valley and also began operations in San Diego. Mercury offices opened in Northern California by 1968. Mercury wrote $1 million in premiums every month by 1970 and sold its first homeowners policy in 1972. The newly created Mercury Insurance Company wrote its first auto policy in 1977.

In 1989, Mercury began expansion outside of California, opening offices in Georgia and Illinois. The company insured more than 1 million vehicles in California by 1998. This led to further expansion to Florida in 1998, New York in 2001, and Virginia in 2001.

== Awards ==
Forbes listed Mercury Insurance on its "100 Most Trustworthy Companies" in 2012 "America’s 50 Most Trusted Financial Companies" in 2014, 2015 and 2016. It has been rated "Excellent" by insurance industry rating agencies AM Best and Fitch. Mercury Insurance was named one of "America’s Best Midsize Employers" by Forbes in 2017.

== Products ==
Mercury provides personal auto insurance from collision, uninsured or underinsured motorist, and roadside assistance. The homeowners insurance includes the structure and belongings coverage. It may provide additional living expenses if policyholders are forced to vacate their homes due to a covered loss or peril. Its umbrella insurance is additional liability protection for personal auto and/or homeowners in the event losses exceed the underlying policy's liability limits.

The dwelling fire insurance is a policy for landlords to protect rental properties. Its extended warranty coverage, also known as mechanical protection, is Mercury's mechanical protection, which pays for covered vehicle repairs after the vehicle manufacturer's warranty expires.

== Driver safety program ==
Mercury Insurance created the Drive Safe Challenge in 2016, promoting teen driver safety. It began as a collaboration between Mercury Insurance, the Anaheim Ducks and the California Highway Patrol in Anaheim, and has since expanded to Florida through a partnership with the Tampa Bay Lightning and Tampa Police Department. Mercury has also developed a free online extension that includes interactive tools and quizzes.

== See also ==
- List of United States insurance companies
