= James Simpson =

James, Jim, or Jimmy Simpson may refer to:

== Politicians ==
- James Simpson (Canadian politician) (1873–1938), Canadian trade unionist and mayor of Toronto (1935)
- James Simpson Ballantyne, Canadian politician
- James Simpson (Ugandan politician) (1908–1994), Minister of Economic Affairs in the first Cabinet of Uganda
- James Simpson Jr. (1905–1960), U.S. Representative from Illinois
- Jim Simpson (Australian politician) (1905–1968), member of the New South Wales Legislative Assembly

== Sportspeople ==
- Jimmy Simpson (footballer, born 1873) (1873–?), Scottish footballer
- Jimmy Simpson (American football) (1897–1979), blocking back in the National Football League
- Jimmy Simpson (motorcyclist) (1898–1981), British motorcycle racer
- Jimmy Simpson (footballer, born 1908) (1908–1972), Scottish footballer
- Jimmy Simpson (footballer, born 1923) (1923–2010), English footballer
- Jim Simpson (sportscaster) (1927–2016), American sportscaster
- Jim Simpson (footballer, born 1959), Scottish footballer
- Jimmy Simpson (racing driver) (born 1992), American racing driver
- James Simpson (wheelchair rugby league), English wheelchair rugby league footballer

== Other people ==
- James Simpson (advocate) (1781–1853), Scottish advocate and author
- James Simpson (businessman), Scottish-American businessman (1874–1939)
- James Simpson (Scottish architect) (1830–1894), Scottish architect
- James Simpson (British Army officer) (1792–1868), general of the British Army
- James Simpson (civil servant) (c. 1792–1857), early Australian civil servant and property developer
- James Simpson (engineer) (1799–1869), president of the Institution of Civil Engineers, 1853–1855
- James Young Simpson (1811–1870), Scottish surgeon and pioneer in use of chloroform as anaesthetic
- James Simpson (Bible Christian) (1812–1859), English deacon and activist
- James H. Simpson (1813–1883), surveyor of the American West for the U.S. Army.
- James Young Simpson (minister) (c. 1843–1898), Methodist minister in South Australia; nephew of the surgeon
- James Simpson (priest) (1865–1948), Dean of Peterborough (1928–1942)
- James Young Simpson (diplomat) (1873–1934), Scottish professor of natural science and a diplomat; great nephew of the surgeon
- James Simpson (explorer) (1911–2002), polar explorer
- James B. Simpson (1927–2002), American journalist and Episcopal priest, known for Simpson's Contemporary Quotations
- James E. Simpson Jr. (1928–1999), Kentucky politician
- James Jenkins Simpson (1881–1936), British entomologist and marine biologist
- James Simpson (academic) (born 1954), Australian academic
- James Simpson (minister) (fl. 1970s–1990s), Moderator of the General Assembly of the Church of Scotland
- Jimmi Simpson (born 1975), American actor
- James Simpson (government official) (fl. 2010s), New Jersey Department of Transportation commissioner and former Federal Transit Administrator for the United States DOT
- Jimbo Simpson (?–2018), Northern Irish paramilitary
- James Alexander Simpson (1805–1880), American painter
- Jim Simpson, founder of Brum Beat, Big Bear Records and Henry's Blueshouse and former manager of Black Sabbath
- James Simpson (writer) (born 1951 or 1952), American author and former budget examiner for the White House Office of Management and Budget

== See also ==
- James Simson (1740–1770), medical academic
- James Simson (surgeon) (1795–1876), Edinburgh surgeon
- Jamie Simpson (born 1986), Australian rugby league coach with the Central Queensland Capras
