= 2013 Firestone Freedom 100 =

Motor race held in Speedway, Indiana (2013)

(United States) 2013 Firestone Freedom 100
Race details
- Race 4 of 12 in the 2013 Indy Lights season
- Layout of Indianapolis Motor Speedway
- Date: May 24, 2013
- Official name: Firestone Freedom 100
- Location: Indianapolis Motor Speedway, Speedway, Indiana, United States
- Course: Permanent racing facility 2.500 mi / 4.023 km
- Distance: 40 laps 100.000 mi / 160.934 km
- Weather: Sunny, dry

Pole position
- Driver: (United States) Sage Karam (Schmidt Peterson Motorsports with Curb–Agajanian)
- Time: 1:35.1160 (2-lap)

Fastest lap
- Driver: (Republic of Ireland) Peter Dempsey (Belardi Auto Racing)
- Time: 46.9312 (on lap 33 of 40)

Podium
- First: (Republic of Ireland) Peter Dempsey (Belardi Auto Racing)
- Second: (Colombia) Gabby Chaves (Schmidt Peterson Motorsports with Curb–Agajanian)
- Third: (United States) Sage Karam (Schmidt Peterson Motorsports with Curb–Agajanian)

The 2013 Firestone Freedom 100 was a Firestone Indy Lights motor race held on May 24, 2013, at Indianapolis Motor Speedway in Speedway, Indiana. It was the fourth of 12 races in the 2013 Firestone Indy Lights and the 11th running of the event. The 40-lap race was won by Belardi Auto Racing driver Peter Dempsey. Gabby Chaves finished second for Schmidt Peterson Motorsports, partnered with Curb–Agajanian, and his teammate Sage Karam was third.

Carlos Muñoz led the Drivers' Championship before the race. Karam earned the first pole position of his career by putting down the fastest two-lap cumulative time of qualifying. He led the race until Muñoz overtook him on lap 13. Muñoz led a total of 27 laps, the most of any driver, but Karam remained close to his rear. On the final lap, Karam drove to the right side of Muñoz on the back stretch and Chaves made the same passing maneuver on him at the entry to the third turn. Dempsey gained a draft from Chaves' car, which allowed him to pass all three drivers and achieve his sole Firestone Indy Lights win with a 0.0026-second margin of victory over Chaves, the closest finish in the track's history until the 2016 Freedom 100.

Muñoz continued leading the Drivers' Championship; Dempsey and Chaves assumed the next two positions in the standings, displacing Karam and Jack Hawksworth with eight races left in the season.

== Background ==
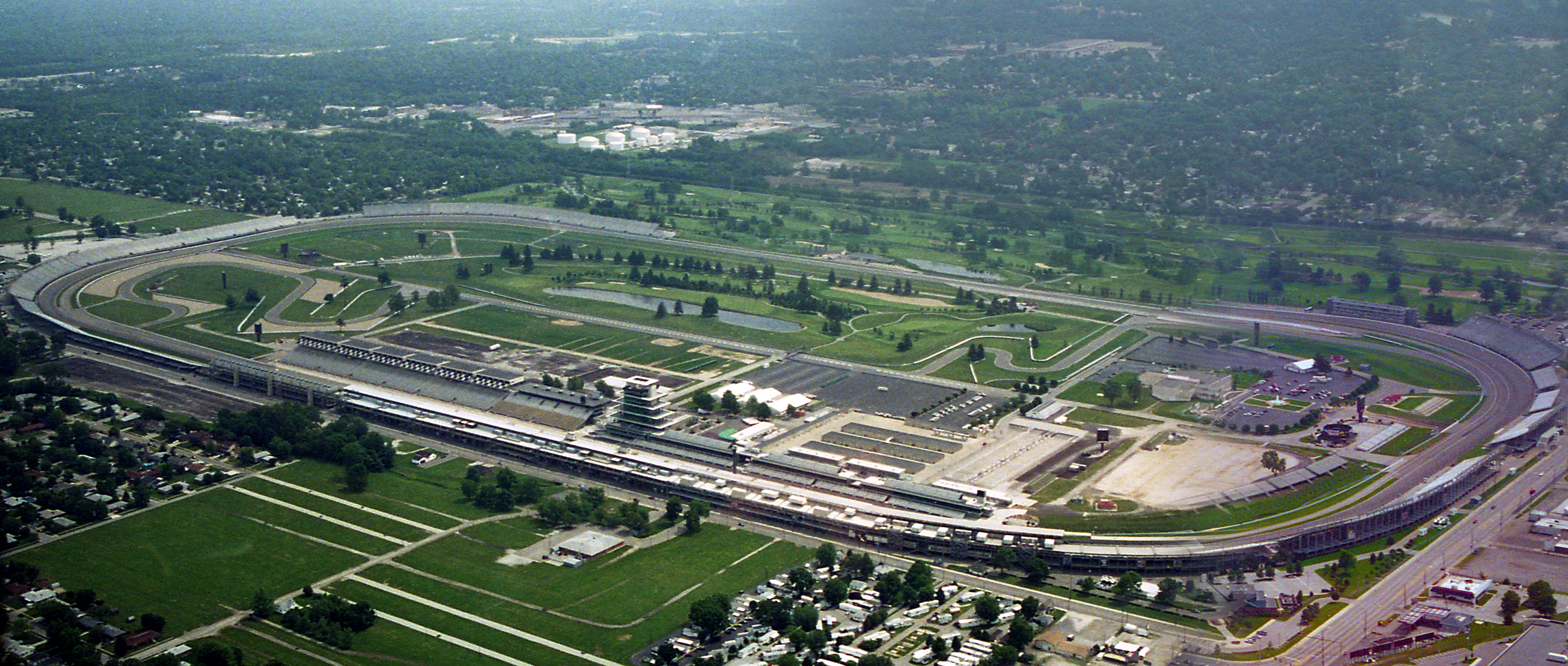
Indianapolis Motor Speedway (pictured in 2001), where the race was held.

The Freedom 100 was introduced to the Firestone Indy Lights schedule in 2003. It was originally held on the second weekend of Indianapolis 500 qualifications, but because of poor attendance rates, it was moved to Carb Day – the Friday before the Indianapolis 500 – in 2005 and quickly became a success among fans. It was considered the series' crown jewel event because it allowed drivers to showcase their talent to teams of the top-level IndyCar Series. Since 2008, the race had been known as the Firestone Freedom 100 after tire supplier Firestone signed on as its title sponsor.

The event's 11th annual iteration was included as the fourth of 12 open-wheel car races in the 2013 Firestone Indy Lights. It was held on Friday, May 24, 2013, at Indianapolis Motor Speedway in Speedway, Indiana and ran for a total of 40 laps over a distance of 100 miles (160 km). The track layout used for the Freedom 100 is a four-turn, 2.5 mi (4.0 km)-long oval track with banking of nine degrees and 12 minutes in each of the turns. The front stretch (where the start-finish line is located) and the back stretch are not banked. Heading into the race, Carlos Muñoz led the Drivers' Championship with 133 points, ahead of Jack Hawksworth with 112 and Sage Karam with 102. Gabby Chaves was fourth on 99 points, and Peter Dempsey and Jorge Goncalvez shared fifth place with 90 points each.

There were 11 cars entered for the race, all of which used Dallara IP2 chassis, Infiniti engines, and Firestone tires. Three of the cars made their season debuts in the Freedom 100. United States Auto Club veteran and Purdue University student Jimmy Simpson partnered with Team Moore Racing for his first Firestone Indy Lights race. Team owner Mark Moore likened him to American open-wheel car racing champions A. J. Foyt and Tony Stewart because of his versatility in different types of racing cars. Kyle O'Gara joined Sarah Fisher Hartman Racing, a team owned by his sister-in-law Sarah Fisher, in partnership with Schmidt Peterson Motorsports, and tested an Indy Lights car at Auto Club Speedway in April. Chase Austin, who achieved two consecutive top-ten results in the past two editions of the Freedom 100, drove a car fielded by Bryan Herta Autosport and Jeffrey Mark Motorsports. Muñoz was the only driver in the field, and the fourth in history, to compete in the Freedom 100 and the Indianapolis 500 on the same weekend. All 11 entries took part in an open test on May 2, which began at 8:00 a.m. Eastern Daylight Time (UTC−04:00) and ended at 5:00 p.m. Zach Veach was the quickest overall driver of the test with a speed of 190.045 miles per hour (305.848 km/h), besting the speeds of O'Gara, Muñoz, Dempsey, and Karam.

== Practice and qualifying ==
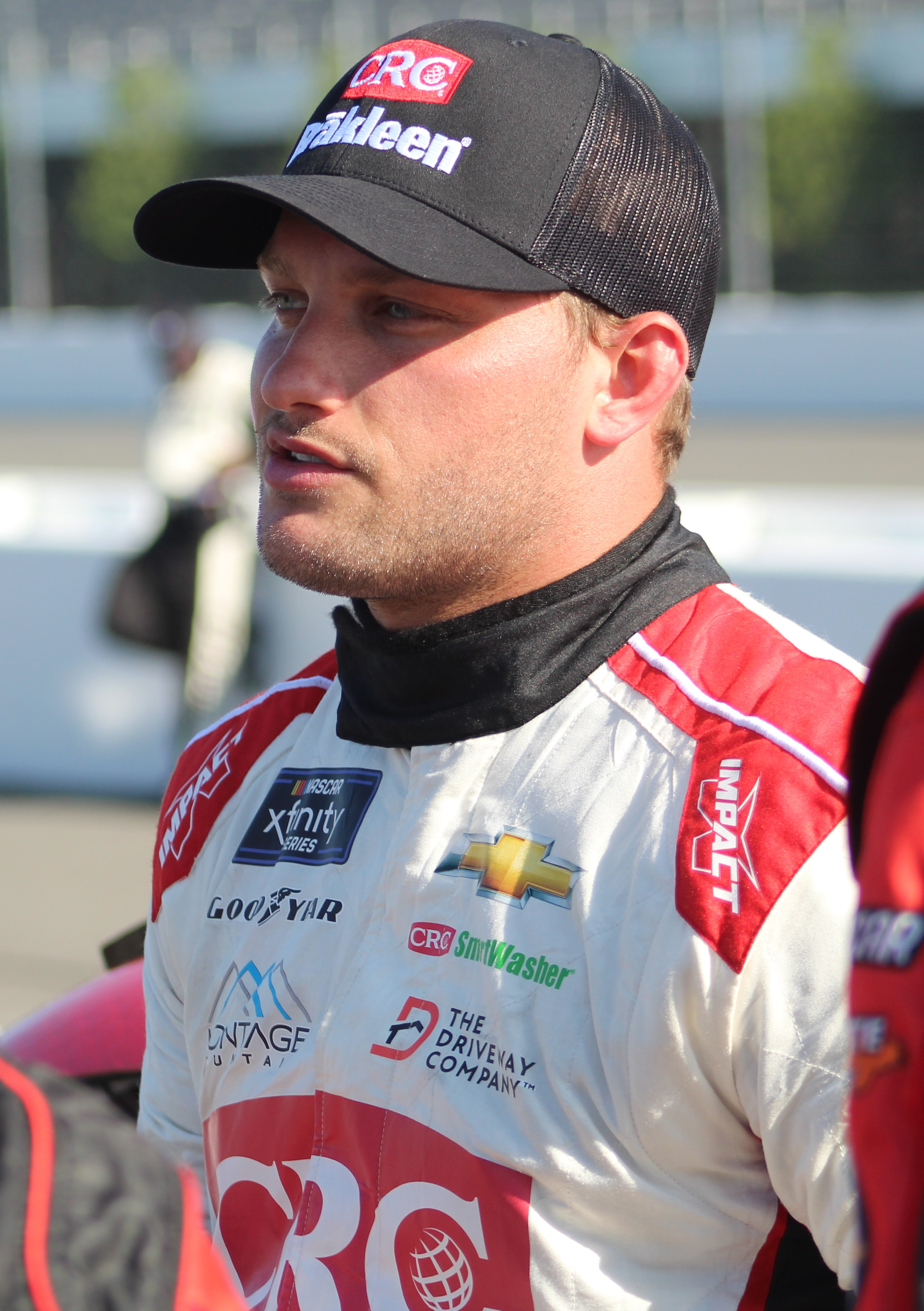
Sage Karam (pictured in 2022) took the pole position, his first in Firestone Indy Lights.

One 180-minute practice session on Thursday morning preceded the Friday race. After overnight showers dampened the track, the start of the session was delayed by 21 minutes in order to clear it. Rain returned 47 minutes in, forcing IndyCar (the series' governing body) to cancel the rest of the session. Karam was the session's quickest driver with a lap time of 47.3732 seconds, ahead of O'Gara, Muñoz, Chaves, and Dempsey.

The light rain that brought an early end to the practice session persisted into the afternoon and pushed the 60-minute qualifying session back three hours from its scheduled start time. During qualifications, each driver was required to complete two timed laps, and their starting position would be determined by their cumulative time. With a time of 1 minute and 35.1160 seconds, Karam achieved the first pole position of his career in his maiden start on an oval track, becoming the first American driver to win the pole for the Freedom 100 since Ken Losch in 2007. He was joined on the grid's front row by Muñoz, who was 0.0703 seconds slower. Chaves, Hawksworth, O'Gara, Veach, Juan Pablo García, Austin, Goncalvez, and Simpson took the remaining positions on the grid. After qualifying, Karam described his pole as a "surprise" because his team was primarily focused on his car's setup for the race.

=== Qualifying classification ===
Final qualifying results
Pos	No.	Driver	Team	Lap 1	Lap 2	Total	Grid
1	8	(United States) Sage Karam	Schmidt Peterson Motorsports with Curb–Agajanian	47.5898	47.5262	1:35.1160	1
2	26	(Colombia) Carlos Muñoz	Andretti Autosport	47.6367	47.5496	1:35.1863	2
3	5	(Republic of Ireland) Peter Dempsey	Belardi Auto Racing	47.8139	47.5287	1:35.3426	3
4	7	(Colombia) Gabby Chaves	Schmidt Peterson Motorsports with Curb–Agajanian	47.9584	47.9035	1:35.8619	4
5	77	(United Kingdom) Jack Hawksworth	Schmidt Peterson Motorsports with Curb–Agajanian	47.9882	48.0577	1:36.0459	5
6	67	(United States) Kyle O'Gara	Sarah Fisher Hartman Racing with Schmidt Peterson Motorsports	48.0274	48.0873	1:36.1147	6
7	12	(United States) Zach Veach	Andretti Autosport	48.1383	48.1116	1:36.2499	7
8	2	(Mexico) Juan Pablo Garcia	Team Moore Racing	48.2453	48.2650	1:36.5103	8
9	28	(United States) Chase Austin	Bryan Herta Autosport with Curb–Agajanian	48.3429	48.2955	1:36.6384	9
10	4	(Venezuela) Jorge Goncalvez	Belardi Auto Racing	48.2760	48.4029	1:36.6789	10
11	22	(United States) Jimmy Simpson	Team Moore Racing	48.3500	48.4412	1:36.7912	11

== Race ==
The 40-lap race began at 12:30 p.m. local time and was televised live in the United States on NBCSN. The weather conditions towards the start of the race were sunny, with an air temperature of 58 °F (14 °C) and a track temperature of 97 °F (36 °C). Simpson spun in turn one on the second and final warm-up lap, but continued. Karam maintained his lead at the start of the race, while Dempsey overtook Muñoz for second place in the first turn. Muñoz reclaimed the position with a maneuver off of turn four. The first caution flag of the race was issued on the second lap when O'Gara spun into the turn four SAFER barrier, sustaining damage to the nose of his car. He resultantly retired from the race. Green-flag racing resumed on the sixth lap, during which Veach claimed fourth place from Chaves and drove alongside third-place Dempsey. By the 11th lap, however, Chaves made his way up to third.

Peter Dempsey (#5 car) beating Gabby Chaves (#7 car), Sage Karam (#8 car), and Carlos Muñoz (#26 car) to win the Firestone Freedom 100.

Muñoz used Karam's slipstream to remain close to the rear of his car, and on lap 13, he completed a pass for the lead in the first and second turns. However, the two drivers raced nose-to-tail over the next 26 laps, as Muñoz was never able to pull more than a tenth of a second clear of Karam. The top-five drivers (Muñoz, Karam, Chaves, Dempsey, and Veach) also stayed within less than a second of each other without changing positions. Meanwhile, Hawksworth became the race's second retiree, having suffered damage to his suspension after hitting the turn-two barrier on the 14th lap. Austin also collided with the wall in turn one three laps later, but carried on in the race.

Muñoz considered giving up the lead to Karam with two laps to go in order to pick up a slipstream, but ultimately stayed in his position. At the beginning of the final lap, Muñoz led Karam by 0.0914 seconds. On the back stretch, Karam drove alongside Muñoz in an attempt to overtake him, and Chaves drove to Karam's outside to set up a three-wide finish through the third and fourth turns. Approaching the checkered flag, Dempsey steered to the inside before drafting off of Chaves to surge by the three leaders on the outermost lane. He raised his left hand in celebration as he took his first Firestone Indy Lights victory in his 20th start. The margin of victory between Dempsey and Chaves was 0.0026 seconds (8.47 inches (215 mm)), the closest finish in the 104-year history of Indianapolis Motor Speedway and the second-closest in series history. (Note: The record was surpassed three years later when Dean Stoneman won the 2016 Freedom 100 by 0.0024 seconds over Ed Jones.) Karam and Muñoz were relegated to third and fourth place, respectively. The last classified finishers were Veach, Goncalvez, Simpson, Austin, and Garcia. There were two lead changes between three different drivers during the race. Muñoz led 27 laps, more than any other driver, while Dempsey only led the final lap.

=== Post-race ===
In an interview after the race, Dempsey said: "Beers are on me tonight. I said it before the race, it’s 40 laps and you go around in circles, but there’s no better place to do that than in Indianapolis Motor Speedway." He thanked his spotter, former Firestone Indy Lights driver Stefan Wilson, for guiding him to the race victory, "I’m glad he spoke to me as much as he did. He won the race for me. He said be patient, get us across the line. They’re going to spread out and you’ll sneak up on them. He’s never won here with himself, but I definitely owe him this one." Second-place Chaves described his thoughts as he reached the finish: "I thought it was going to be three-wide to the finish and all of a sudden here comes Peter [Dempsey] and I'm thinking, oh my gosh, how can I make my car wider?" Karam, in third, called the race "strategic" and believed that "[he] just put [him]self into position to win it." As a result of the race, Muñoz maintained his Drivers' Championship lead with 167 points, while Dempsey was promoted to second place with 140, as did Chaves to third with 139. Karam, on 138 points, dropped to fourth place, and Hawksworth was demoted three positions to fifth on 132 points as eight races remained in the season.

=== Race classification ===
Final race results
Pos	No.	Driver	Team	Laps	Time/Retired	Grid	Points
1	5	(Republic of Ireland) Peter Dempsey	Belardi Auto Racing	40	36:48.6540	3	50
2	7	(Colombia) Gabby Chaves	Schmidt Peterson Motorsports with Curb–Agajanian	40	+0.0026	4	40
3	8	(United States) Sage Karam	Schmidt Peterson Motorsports with Curb–Agajanian	40	+0.0280	1	36^{1}
4	26	(Colombia) Carlos Muñoz	Andretti Autosport	40	+0.0443	2	34^{2}
5	12	(United States) Zach Veach	Andretti Autosport	40	+5.3052	6	30
6	4	(Venezuela) Jorge Goncalvez	Belardi Auto Racing	40	+10.5236	10	28
7	22	(United States) Jimmy Simpson	Team Moore Racing	40	+21.0047	11	26
8	28	(United States) Chase Austin	Bryan Herta Autosport with Curb–Agajanian	40	+21.5583	9	24
9	2	(Mexico) Juan Pablo Garcia	Team Moore Racing	40	+21.6514	7	22
10	77	(United Kingdom) Jack Hawksworth	Schmidt Peterson Motorsports with Curb–Agajanian	14	Contact	5	20
11	67	(United States) Kyle O'Gara	Sarah Fisher Hartman Racing with Schmidt Peterson Motorsports	2	Contact	6	19

Notes

- ^1 – Includes one bonus point for winning the pole position.
- ^2 – Includes two bonus points for leading the most laps.

== Championship standings after the race ==
Drivers' Championship standings
+/–	Pos	Driver	Points
	1	(Colombia) Carlos Muñoz	167
3	2	(Republic of Ireland) Peter Dempsey	140 (–27)
1	3	(Colombia) Gabby Chaves	139 (–28)
1	4	(United States) Sage Karam	138 (–29)
3	5	(United Kingdom) Jack Hawksworth	132 (–35)

- Note: Only the top five positions are included.
