= 2013 Indianapolis 500 =

American motor race

97th Indianapolis 500

Indianapolis Motor Speedway

Indianapolis 500
- Sanctioning body: INDYCAR
- Season: 2013 IndyCar season
- Date: May 26, 2013
- Winner: (Brazil) Tony Kanaan
- Winning team: KV Racing Technology
- Winning Chief Mechanic: Jeff Simon
- Time of race: 2:40:03.4181
- Average speed: 187.433 mph (301.644 km/h)
- Pole position: (United States) Ed Carpenter
- Pole speed: 228.762 mph (368.157 km/h)
- Fastest qualifier: (Australia) Will Power
- Rookie of the Year: (Colombia) Carlos Muñoz
- Most laps led: (United States) Ed Carpenter (37)

Pre-race ceremonies
- National anthem: Sandi Patty
- "Back Home Again in Indiana": Jim Nabors
- Starting command: Mari Hulman George
- Pace car: 2014 Chevrolet Corvette Stingray
- Pace car driver: Jim Harbaugh
- Two-seater: Mario Andretti (driver); Cpl. Barry Walton (passenger)
- Starter: Paul Blevin
- Honorary starter: Michael Peña
- Estimated attendance: TBD

Television in the United States
- Network: ABC
- Announcers: Marty Reid, Scott Goodyear, Eddie Cheever
- Nielsen ratings: 3.7

Chronology
Previous	Next
2012	2014

The 97th Indianapolis 500 was held at the Indianapolis Motor Speedway in Speedway, Indiana on Sunday May 26, 2013. It was the premier event of the 2013 IZOD IndyCar Series season. Tony Kanaan, a native of Brazil, was victorious on a record-setting day. Kanaan became the fourth Brazilian driver to win the Indianapolis 500 joined by Emerson Fittipaldi, Helio Castroneves, and Gil de Ferran.

The track opened for practice on Saturday, May 11. Time trials were held May 18–19, and the final practice, traditionally dubbed "Carb Day", was Friday, May 24. A support race, the Freedom 100 for the Indy Lights series was also held on Carb Day. In time trials, owner/driver Ed Carpenter of Indianapolis won the pole position, the first American-born pole-sitter since 2006, and the first owner/driver to sit on the pole since 1975.

For the first time since 1987, two drivers in the field entered the race attempting to win a fourth Indianapolis 500. Three-time winners Hélio Castroneves (2001, 2002, 2009) and Dario Franchitti (2007, 2010, 2012) attempted to tie A. J. Foyt, Al Unser Sr. and Rick Mears for the most Indy 500 victories. Neither driver was victorious this day, though Castroneves would achieve the feat in 2021. Unknown at the time, the 2013 race would be Franchitti's last; he retired after suffering severe injuries in a crash at Houston about five months later.

After eleven previous attempts, Tony Kanaan, racing for KV Racing Technology, won the race. On a restart with three laps remaining, Kanaan overtook leader Ryan Hunter-Reay in the first turn. Three-time champion Dario Franchitti got loose and crashed into the outside wall bringing out the final caution of the race. Kanaan led Rookie of the Year Carlos Muñoz and Hunter-Reay across the line. The average speed of the race – 187.433 mph (301.644 km/h) – was the fastest Indianapolis 500, breaking the record set in 1990 by Arie Luyendyk. The record would stand until 2021. The 68 lead changes, and 14 different leaders, set during the race were also new records at the time. Other records set (each of which have since been broken) included most cars running at the finish in a race that completed 200 laps (26), fewest caution laps (21), most laps completed by the field (5,863), as well as a 133-lap caution-free segment from lap 61 through 193.

Chevrolet swept the top four finishing positions, and took its first Indianapolis 500 win since 2002, breaking Honda's streak of nine consecutive Indy 500 wins. Chassis manufacturer Dallara won its eighth straight Indy 500, and 13th overall since joining the series in 1997.

== Event background ==
Indianapolis Motor Speedway

- For the first time since 1989, the Indy 500 was part of an Indy car "triple crown" along with Pocono and Fontana. A $1 million bonus prize was offered for any driver to win all three races in the same season.
- Lotus, who fielded underpowered and uncompetitive engines in 2012, was released from its contract, and did not participate from 2013 onwards.
- On December 21, 2012, Firestone signed a five-year contract extension to be the exclusive official tire supplier through 2018.
- Following its popular success during the festivities surrounding Super Bowl XLVI, a zip-line was installed in the infield.
- After missing the 2012 race due to an illness, Jim Nabors returned to perform "Back Home Again in Indiana" during the pre-race ceremonies. It was his 33rd year performing the song in-person, and 35th overall.

=== Selected rules and rule changes ===
- Cars will be allowed 130 kPa of turbocharger "boost" during practice (Saturday through Thursday), Carb Day, and race day. Cars will be allowed 140 kPa of boost for "Fast Friday" practice, and during time trials.
- All entries will be allowed a total of 33 sets of tires for practice, time trials and race day. Rookie orientation participants receive four additional sets for exclusive use during that session, and likewise refresher test participants receive two additional sets for use during that session. Entries that qualify for the Fast Nine "Shootout" on Pole Day will receive an additional new set of tires for use during each shootout qualifying attempt, but they must be returned and can not be used during the race.
- Full-time IndyCar entries must adhere to the required 2,000-mile engine mileage limits. Unapproved engine changes will see a 10-position grid penalty at the next race of the season (Detroit). Most full-time teams will enter the month with the same engine they used earlier in the season (Brazil, Long Beach, etc.). The 2,000 miles on the engine must be exhausted during practice before installing a fresh engine for "Fast Friday" and qualifying. At the close of time trials, an additional fresh engine may be installed for Carb Day and race day, without penalty. However, the time trials engine (and the race day engine) must be re-installed and utilized for later events if it still has miles remaining on it.
- Part-time teams utilizing the "Short" engine program will be provided with one engine for use during practice, time trials, and race day.

== Schedule ==
Race schedule — May 2013
Sun	Mon	Tue	Wed	Thu	Fri	Sat
			1	2	3	4 Mini-Marathon
5 São Paulo	6	7	8	9 Testing	10	11; Practice/ROP
12; Practice/ROP	13; Practice	14; Practice	15; Practice	16; Practice	17; Practice	18; Pole Day
19; Bump Day	20	21	22; Comm. Day	23; Indy Lights	24; Carb Day	25; Legends Day
26; Indy 500	27; Memorial Day	28	29	30	31	

Color	Notes
Green	Practice
Dark blue	Time trials
Silver	Race day
Red	Rained out*
Blank	No track activity

* Includes days where track activity
was significantly limited due to rain

ROP — denotes rookie orientation program

Comm. — denotes 500 Festival Community Day

== Entry list ==
The official entry list was released May 7, featuring 34 entries. The initial entry list included four rookies (A. J. Allmendinger, Conor Daly, Tristan Vautier, Carlos Muñoz) and four former winners in Hélio Castroneves, Dario Franchitti, Scott Dixon and Buddy Lazier.

Ryan Briscoe—who took pole position for the 2012 race—was unable to secure a full-time drive for the 2013 season, but participated in the race in a fourth car entered by Chip Ganassi Racing.

No.	Driver	Status	Entrant	Engine	Sponsor
1	(United States) Ryan Hunter-Reay		Andretti Autosport	Chevrolet	DHL
2	(United States) A. J. Allmendinger	R	Team Penske	Chevrolet	IZOD
3	(Brazil) Hélio Castroneves	W	Team Penske	Chevrolet	Shell V-Power/Pennzoil Ultra
4	(United States) J. R. Hildebrand		Panther Racing	Chevrolet	National Guard/Man of Steel
5	(Venezuela) E. J. Viso		Team Venezuela/Andretti Autosport/HVM	Chevrolet	PDVSA/Citgo
6	(Colombia) Sebastián Saavedra		Dragon Racing	Chevrolet	TrueCar
7	(France) Sébastien Bourdais		Dragon Racing	Chevrolet	McAfee/Microsoft Bing
8	(Australia) Ryan Briscoe		Chip Ganassi Racing	Honda	NTT DATA/Hulu
9	(New Zealand) Scott Dixon	W	Target Chip Ganassi Racing	Honda	Target
10	(United Kingdom) Dario Franchitti	W	Target Chip Ganassi Racing	Honda	Target
11	(Brazil) Tony Kanaan		KV Racing Technology	Chevrolet	Hydroxycut/Mouser
12	(Australia) Will Power		Team Penske	Chevrolet	Verizon
14	(Japan) Takuma Sato		A. J. Foyt Enterprises	Honda	ABC Supply Co./Panasonic
15	(United States) Graham Rahal		Rahal Letterman Lanigan Racing	Honda	Midas/Big O Tires
16	(United Kingdom) James Jakes		Rahal Letterman Lanigan Racing	Honda	Acorn Stairlifts
17	(Mexico) Michel Jourdain Jr.		Rahal Letterman Lanigan Racing	Honda	Office Depot
18	(Brazil) Ana Beatriz		Dale Coyne Racing	Honda	Ipiranga
19	(United Kingdom) Justin Wilson		Dale Coyne Racing	Honda	Boy Scouts of America/Sonny's BBQ
20	(United States) Ed Carpenter		Ed Carpenter Racing	Chevrolet	Fuzzy's Vodka
21	(United States) Josef Newgarden		Sarah Fisher Hartman Racing	Honda	Century 21
22	(Spain) Oriol Servià		Panther DRR	Chevrolet	Mecum Auctions
25	(United States) Marco Andretti		Andretti Autosport	Chevrolet	RC Cola
26	(Colombia) Carlos Muñoz	R	Andretti Autosport	Chevrolet	Electric Energy Straws/Dially-Ser
27	(Canada) James Hinchcliffe		Andretti Autosport	Chevrolet	GoDaddy.com
41	(United States) Conor Daly	R	A. J. Foyt Enterprises	Honda	ABC Supply Co.
55	(France) Tristan Vautier	R	Schmidt Peterson Motorsports	Honda	Lucas Oil
60	(United States) Townsend Bell		Panther Racing	Chevrolet	Sunoco "Turbo"
63	(United Kingdom) Pippa Mann		Dale Coyne Racing	Honda	Cyclops Gear
77	(France) Simon Pagenaud		Schmidt Hamilton Motorsports	Honda	Hewlett-Packard
78	(Switzerland) Simona de Silvestro		KV Racing Technology	Chevrolet	Nuclear Clean Air Energy (Areva)
81	(United Kingdom) Katherine Legge		Schmidt Peterson Motorsports	Honda	Angie's List
83	(United States) Charlie Kimball		Chip Ganassi Racing	Honda	NovoLog FlexPen
91	(United States) Buddy Lazier	W	Lazier Partners Racing	Chevrolet	Advance Auto Parts
98	(Canada) Alex Tagliani		Bryan Herta Autosport	Honda	Barracuda Networks/Bowers & Wilkins

Icon	Meaning
R	Rookie driver
W	Former winner

== Practice and rookie orientation ==
Rookie orientation was scheduled for Thursday, April 11. However, due to a poor weather forecast, was postponed. Instead, rookies will participate in special two-hour sessions during the first two days of Indianapolis 500 practice.

=== Testing – Thursday, May 9 ===
A private test focused on NASCAR driver Kurt Busch, who tested a car for Andretti Autosport. Busch conducted the evaluation test with the possibility of attempting "Double Duty" in 2014. Busch reached a top lap of 218 mph.

=== Practice and rookie orientation – Saturday, May 11 ===
- Weather: 51 °F (11 °C), cloudy
- Practice summary: Opening Day featured veteran practice from 12–2 p.m., rookie orientation from 2–4 p.m., followed by a second session of veteran practice from 4–6 p.m. Hélio Castroneves was the first car to pull out on to the track, while Josef Newgarden was the first to complete a lap. During the first session, nine cars took to the track, with no incidents reported.

Rookie orientation featured three drivers, A. J. Allmendinger, Carlos Muñoz and Tristan Vautier. Conor Daly was absent due to his participation in the GP3 race at Barcelona. All three drivers passed the three-phase rookie test, and became eligible to practice during the veteran sessions. Daly will be given time to complete the test on Monday.

After rookie orientation, a brief rain shower closed the track from 4:00 p.m. to 4:33 p.m. A total of 15 drivers completed 480 laps Saturday without incident.

Top practice speeds
Pos	No.	Driver	Team	Engine	Speed
1	20	(United States) Ed Carpenter	Ed Carpenter Racing	Chevrolet	220.970
2	21T	(United States) Josef Newgarden	Sarah Fisher Hartman Racing	Honda	220.920
3	26	(Colombia) Carlos Muñoz R	Andretti Autosport	Chevrolet	220.720
OFFICIAL DAILY TRACKSIDE REPORT

=== Practice – Sunday, May 12 ===
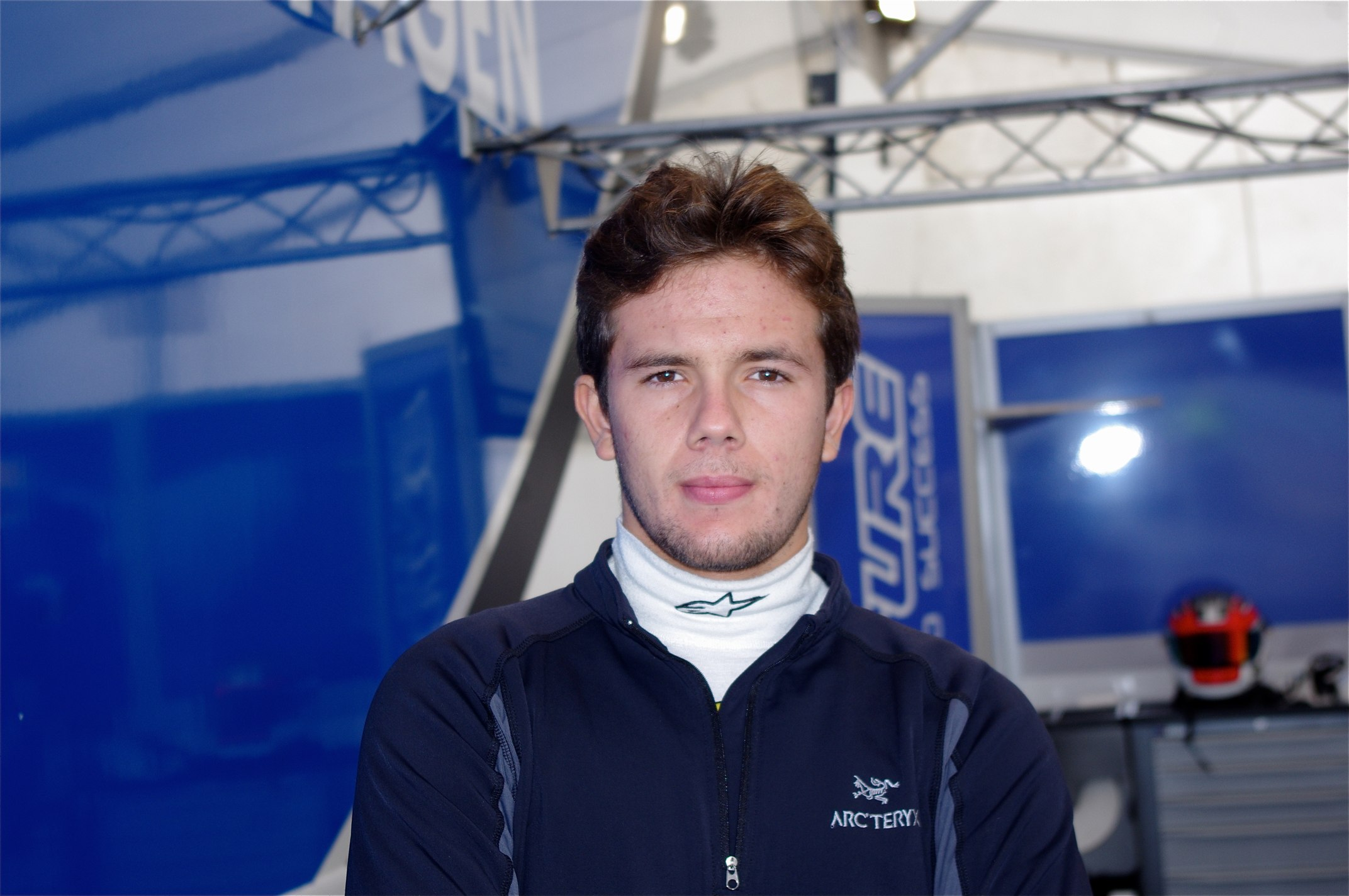
Rookie Carlos Muñoz led practice on two days, and qualified second on the starting grid.

- Weather: 51 °F (11 °C), sunny, windy
- Practice summary: A total of 22 drivers completed 730 laps Sunday, without incident. A cool, windy afternoon kept some teams and drivers off the track for the day. Rookie Carlos Muñoz led the speed chart, while Andretti Autosport teammates swept five of the top six spots for the day.

Top practice speeds
Pos	No.	Driver	Team	Engine	Speed
1	26	(Colombia) Carlos Muñoz R	Andretti Autosport	Chevrolet	223.023
2	1	(United States) Ryan Hunter-Reay	Andretti Autosport	Chevrolet	222.825
3	5	(Venezuela) E. J. Viso	Andretti Autosport	Chevrolet	222.523
OFFICIAL DAILY TRACKSIDE REPORT

=== Practice – Monday, May 13 ===
- Weather: 66 °F (19 °C), sunny
- Practice summary: A total of 32 drivers took laps on a busy day of practice. Favorable weather conditions saw heavy action, with 1,799 laps completed. Andretti Autosport cars again topped the speed chart, with Marco Andretti setting the fastest lap thus far in the month. No incidents were reported. Rookie Conor Daly, who missed rookie orientation due to competing in Spain, completed his three-phase rookie test in the morning. In addition, Pippa Mann completed a refresher test.

Top practice speeds
Pos	No.	Driver	Team	Engine	Speed
1	25	(United States) Marco Andretti	Andretti Autosport	Chevrolet	225.100
2	3	(Brazil) Hélio Castroneves	Team Penske	Chevrolet	225.075
3	1	(United States) Ryan Hunter-Reay	Andretti Autosport	Chevrolet	224.386
OFFICIAL DAILY TRACKSIDE REPORT

=== Practice – Tuesday, May 14 ===
- Weather: 87 °F (31 °C), sunny
- Practice summary: The warmest day of practice thus far saw temperatures in the mid-80s, and sunny skies. A total of 32 drivers took 2,226 laps without incident. James Hinchcliffe drove Marco Andretti's car #25 to a lap of 224.210 mph, for the fastest lap of the day. Andretti himself drove the car to a lap of 223.570 mph, good enough for third on the speed chart. Andretti Autosport took the top spot in practice for the third straight day. The only driver entered to not take any laps during the month has been Buddy Lazier.

Top practice speeds
Pos	No.	Driver	Team	Engine	Speed
1	25	(Canada) James Hinchcliffe	Andretti Autosport	Chevrolet	224.210
2	4	(United States) J. R. Hildebrand	Panther Racing	Chevrolet	223.652
3	25	(United States) Marco Andretti	Andretti Autosport	Chevrolet	223.570
OFFICIAL DAILY TRACKSIDE REPORT

=== Practice – Wednesday, May 15 ===
- Weather: 91 °F (33 °C), sunny
- Practice summary: A total of 32 drivers completed 2,165 laps without any major incidents. Several drivers took time driving in packs, simulating race conditions. Dario Franchitti, along with Honda, topped the speed chart for the first for the month. The only minor incident of the day involved Sebastián Saavedra. His car lost paint and decals off the engine cover, bringing out a yellow for debris and track inspection. Sixteen of the full-time entries had passed the required 2,000-mile threshold, and took to the track Wednesday with fresh powerplants.

Top practice speeds
Pos	No.	Driver	Team	Engine	Speed
1	10	(United Kingdom) Dario Franchitti	Target Chip Ganassi Racing	Honda	224.235
2	60	(United States) Townsend Bell	Panther Racing	Chevrolet	223.716
3	3	(Brazil) Hélio Castroneves	Team Penske	Chevrolet	223.699
OFFICIAL DAILY TRACKSIDE REPORT

=== Practice – Thursday, May 16 ===
- Weather: 83 °F (28 °C), sunny. Brief shower at 12:11 p.m.
- Practice summary: At 2:19 p.m., rookie Conor Daly crashed in turn one, the first major incident of the week. Halfway through the turn, the rear end stepped out, and he made contact with the SAFER barrier at the exit one with the right side. He spun through the southchute, and the car nearly overturned, coming to rest upright in turn 2. Daly exited the car and was uninjured.

For the second time of the week, rookie Carlos Muñoz topped the speed chart, with a lap of 225.163 mph, the fastest of the month. It was Andretti Autosport's fourth day leading practice, and the second time they swept the top three speeds for the day. A total of 2,227 laps were completed, with 33 drivers having taken laps during the month. Buddy Lazier made it 33 as he took the track for the first time. He conducted installation laps in preparations for a refresher test scheduled for Friday.

Top practice speeds
Pos	No.	Driver	Team	Engine	Speed
1	26	(Colombia) Carlos Muñoz R	Andretti Autosport	Chevrolet	225.163
2	1	(United States) Ryan Hunter-Reay	Andretti Autosport	Chevrolet	225.006
3	25	(United States) Marco Andretti	Andretti Autosport	Chevrolet	224.882
OFFICIAL DAILY TRACKSIDE REPORT

=== Fast Friday practice – Friday, May 17 ===
- Weather: 81 °F (27 °C), cloudy; light rain at 2:52 p.m., thunderstorms at 3:15 p.m.
- Practice summary: E. J. Viso led the speed chart with a lap of 229.537 mph, the fastest lap of the month, and the fastest practice lap at the track since 2003. Veteran Buddy Lazier opened the morning with a refresher test. Within a few laps, Lazier was practicing over 219 mph. During the "Fast Friday" practice session, a total of 32 drivers took laps, with Conor Daly the only participant not on the track. Daly was sidelined while the Foyt team rebuilt his car after his Thursday crash. With Andretti Autosport cars again sweeping the top three spots on the speed chart, rain entered the area around 3 p.m. Severe thunderstorms closed the track for the day officially at 3:42 p.m.

Top practice speeds
Pos	No.	Driver	Team	Engine	Speed
1	5	(Venezuela) E. J. Viso	Andretti Autosport	Chevrolet	229.537
2	25	(United States) Marco Andretti	Andretti Autosport	Chevrolet	228.754
3	26	(Colombia) Carlos Muñoz R	Andretti Autosport	Chevrolet	228.520
OFFICIAL DAILY TRACKSIDE REPORT

== Time trials ==
=== Pole Day time trials: segment 1 – Saturday, May 18 ===
- Weather: 81 °F (27 °C), partly sunny
- Qualifying summary: During the morning practice session, Will Power turned the fastest lap of the month at 229.808 mph. At the conclusion of practice, rain fell and delayed the start of time trials. The rain shower was short in duration, and the track was dried. Trials began at 1:28 p.m. Scott Dixon was the first driver in the field. During the afternoon session, a total of 31 drivers completed attempts. Chevrolet swept the top ten spots on the speed chart, and 13 of the top 15. Alex Tagliani, the fastest of the Honda teams, managed only an 11th starting position on the grid. Will Power (228.844 mph) set the fastest speed of Session 1, and the top nine would advance to the Top Nine Shootout.

As the segment came to a close, the attention focused on Graham Rahal, Josef Newgarden and Simona de Silvestro. All three were among the drivers attempting to make the top 24 for the day. Rahal was too slow to make the field, while de Silvestro managed to bump her way in. In the last 30 minutes, Townsend Bell made two attempts, the second of which bumped his way in. With time running out, Newgarden was bumped out by James Jakes. Newgarden ran out of time to get back in line to make an attempt, and would have to wait until Sunday to qualify.

Pole Day – first segment – Saturday, May 18, 2013
Pos.	No.	Driver	Team	Engine	Speed	Pts.
Positions 1–9
1	12	(Australia) Will Power	Team Penske	Chevrolet	228.844	–
2	1	(United States) Ryan Hunter-Reay	Andretti Autosport	Chevrolet	228.282	–
3	26	(Colombia) Carlos Muñoz R	Andretti Autosport	Chevrolet	228.171	–
4	3	(Brazil) Hélio Castroneves	Team Penske	Chevrolet	227.975	–
5	20	(United States) Ed Carpenter	Ed Carpenter Racing	Chevrolet	227.952	–
6	25	(United States) Marco Andretti	Andretti Autosport	Chevrolet	227.893	–
7	2	(United States) A. J. Allmendinger R	Team Penske	Chevrolet	227.761	–
8	5	(Venezuela) E. J. Viso	Andretti Autosport	Chevrolet	227.612	–
9	27	(Canada) James Hinchcliffe	Andretti Autosport	Chevrolet	227.493	–
Positions 10–24
10	4	(United States) J. R. Hildebrand	Panther Racing	Chevrolet	227.441	4
11	98	(Canada) Alex Tagliani	Barracuda Racing	Honda	227.386	4
12	11	(Brazil) Tony Kanaan	KV Racing Technology	Chevrolet	226.949	4
13	22	(Spain) Oriol Servià	Panther DRR	Chevrolet	226.814	4
14	19	(United Kingdom) Justin Wilson	Dale Coyne Racing	Honda	226.370	4
15	7	(France) Sébastien Bourdais	Dragon Racing	Chevrolet	226.196	4
16	9	(New Zealand) Scott Dixon	Chip Ganassi Racing	Honda	226.158	4
17	10	(United Kingdom) Dario Franchitti	Chip Ganassi Racing	Honda	226.069	4
18	14	(Japan) Takuma Sato	A. J. Foyt Enterprises	Honda	225.892	4
19	83	(United States) Charlie Kimball	Chip Ganassi Racing	Honda	225.880	4
20	16	(United Kingdom) James Jakes	Rahal Letterman Lanigan Racing	Honda	225.809	4
21	77	(France) Simon Pagenaud	Schmidt Hamilton Motorsports	Honda	225.674	4
22	60	(United States) Townsend Bell	Panther Racing	Chevrolet	225.643	4
23	8	(Australia) Ryan Briscoe	Chip Ganassi Racing	Honda	225.265	4
24	78	(Switzerland) Simona de Silvestro	KV Racing Technology	Chevrolet	225.226	4
Other attempts
	21	(United States) Josef Newgarden	Sarah Fisher Hartman Racing	Honda	225.210	
	18	(Brazil) Ana Beatriz	Dale Coyne Racing	Honda	225.117	
	15	(United States) Graham Rahal	Rahal Letterman Lanigan Racing	Honda	224.950	
	6	(Colombia) Sebastián Saavedra	Dragon Racing	Chevrolet	224.656	
	55	(France) Tristan Vautier R	Schmidt Peterson Motorsports	Honda	224.156	
	91	(United States) Buddy Lazier	Lazier Partners Racing	Chevrolet	223.073	
	17	(Mexico) Michel Jourdain Jr.	Rahal Letterman Lanigan Racing	Honda	218.329	
	41	(United States) Conor Daly R	A. J. Foyt Enterprises	Honda	Waved Off	
	63	(United Kingdom) Pippa Mann	Dale Coyne Racing	Honda	No Attempt	

=== Pole Day time trials: Fast Nine Shootout – Saturday, May 18 ===
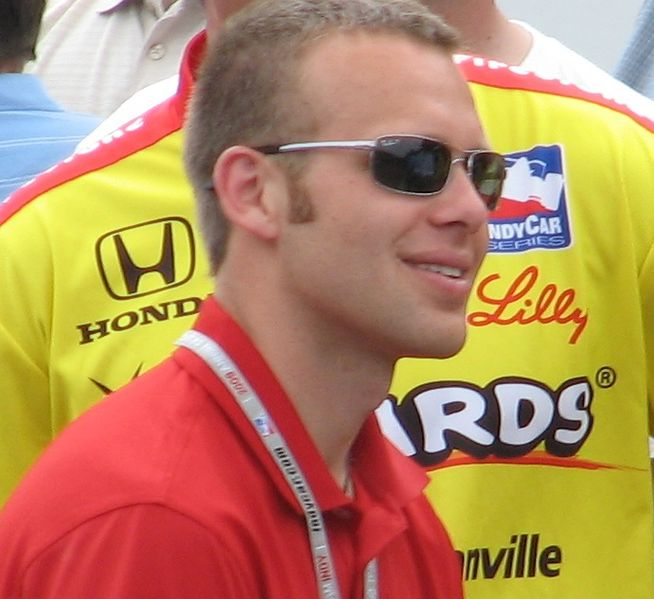
Ed Carpenter won the pole position.

- Weather: 80 °F (27 °C), mostly cloudy
- Summary: The top nine drivers from segment 1 returned to the track for the Fast Nine Shootout to determine the pole position. Due to the rain delay earlier in the afternoon, the Shootout segment was rescheduled for 6:30 p.m. Each of the nine cars would be allowed one qualifying attempt.

Marco Andretti was the first driver to make a significant improvement on his starting position, putting himself tentatively on the pole. The next car out, Ed Carpenter, raised eyebrows with a first lap of 229.347 mph, and a four-lap average of 228.762 mph. Carpenter bumped Andretti off the top spot, but still had four drivers waiting to make attempts. Rookie Carlos Muñoz squeezed himself on to the front row, landing in second starting position. The final driver with a shot for the pole was Will Power, who was fastest in segment 1. Power's first lap was in the 229 mph range, but his third and fourth laps dropped off significantly. Power ended up 6th, and Ed Carpenter secured his first Indy 500 pole position. It was the first pole for an American-born driver since Sam Hornish Jr. in 2006, and the first by an owner/driver since A. J. Foyt in 1975.

Pole Day – Fast Nine Shootout – Saturday, May 18
Pos.	No.	Driver	Team	Engine	Speed	Pts.
1	20	(United States) Ed Carpenter	Ed Carpenter Racing	Chevrolet	228.762	15
2	26	(Colombia) Carlos Muñoz R	Andretti Autosport	Chevrolet	228.342	13
3	25	(United States) Marco Andretti	Andretti Autosport	Chevrolet	228.261	12
4	5	(Venezuela) E. J. Viso	Andretti Autosport	Chevrolet	228.150	11
5	2	(United States) A. J. Allmendinger R	Team Penske	Chevrolet	228.099	10
6	12	(Australia) Will Power	Team Penske	Chevrolet	228.087	9
7	1	(United States) Ryan Hunter-Reay	Andretti Autosport	Chevrolet	227.904	8
8	3	(Brazil) Hélio Castroneves	Team Penske	Chevrolet	227.762	7
9	27	(Canada) James Hinchcliffe	Andretti Autosport	Chevrolet	227.070	6

=== Bump Day time trials – Sunday, May 19 ===
- Weather: Partly Cloudy 82 °F (28 °C)
- Bump Day summary: The day opened with nine spots available in the starting field. A total of ten drivers were preparing to make qualifying attempts. During morning practice, Katherine Legge took practice laps for the first time during the month. At 12 noon, qualifying opened, and in the first hour, the field was filled to 33 cars. At 1 p.m., Katherine Legge was on the bubble, and the only car to not make an attempt was Michel Jourdain Jr. The Rahal Letterman Lanigan Racing team was having considerable difficulty getting Jourdain's car up to speed, and as the afternoon progressed, the team was not making progress. After several drastic changes to the car's set-ups, the team decided to park the car at 5:45 p.m., and did not make a qualifying attempt.

Bump Day – Sunday, May 19, 2013
Pos.	No.	Driver	Team	Engine	Speed	Pts.
25	21	(United States) Josef Newgarden	Sarah Fisher Hartman Racing	Honda	225.731	3
26	15	(United States) Graham Rahal	Rahal Letterman Lanigan Racing	Honda	225.007	3
27	6	(Colombia) Sebastián Saavedra	Dragon Racing	Chevrolet	224.929	3
28	55	(France) Tristan Vautier R	Schmidt Peterson Motorsports	Honda	224.873	3
29	18	(Brazil) Ana Beatriz	Dale Coyne Racing	Honda	224.184	3
30	63	(United Kingdom) Pippa Mann	Dale Coyne Racing	Honda	224.005	3
31	41	(United States) Conor Daly R	A. J. Foyt Enterprises	Honda	223.582	3
32	91	(United States) Buddy Lazier	Lazier Partners Racing	Chevrolet	223.442	3
33	81	(United Kingdom) Katherine Legge	Schmidt Peterson Motorsports	Honda	223.176	3

== Carb Day ==
=== Practice ===
The final practice session was held Friday May 24. Simon Pagenaud (225.827 mph) turned the fastest lap of the day. Three minor incidents were reported. Takuma Sato had a small engine fire at the beginning of the session, but it was extinguished quickly by the team. Ana Beatriz made contact with Carlos Muñoz entering the pits. The car suffered minor damage to the front wing. Ryan Briscoe suffered an engine fire as time expired in the session. He pulled the car over in the warm-up lane of turn four, and climbed from the cockpit uninjured.

=== Pit Stop Challenge ===
The 36th annual Pit Stop Challenge was held on Friday May 24. The competition featured twelve participants in a single-elimination bracket-style match-up. Four teams received byes, while eight teams competed in the first round. The format has two cars competing in a head-to-head layout resembling a drag race. The cars race from a standing start and drive into the pit box, change four tires, simulate a refueling, and race to a finish line a few hundred feet down the pit lane. Team Penske won the pit stop competition for the 14th time, with driver Helio Castroneves (his 6th win individually in the event).

First Round
10	Dario Franchitti (Chip Ganassi Racing)	13.393
27	James Hinchcliffe (Andretti Autosport)	14.427
8	Ryan Briscoe (Chip Ganassi Racing)	13.765
14	Takuma Sato (A. J. Foyt Racing)	No time
11	Tony Kanaan (KV Racing)	14.188
83	Charlie Kimball (Chip Ganassi Racing)
22	Oriol Servià (Panther DRR)	13.719
26	Marco Andretti (Andretti Autosport)	Stalled

Quarterfinals
10	Dario Franchitti (Chip Ganassi Racing)	12.493
12	Will Power (Team Penske)	12.731
1	Ryan Hunter-Reay (Andretti Autosport)	13.574
8	Ryan Briscoe (Chip Ganassi Racing)	14.130
3	Helio Castroneves (Team Penske)	14.178
11	Tony Kanaan (KV Racing)	14.806
22	Oriol Servià (Panther DRR)	13.322
9	Scott Dixon (Chip Ganassi Racing)	13.423

Semifinals
10	Dario Franchitti (Chip Ganassi Racing)	12.330
1	Ryan Hunter-Reay (Andretti Autosport)	13.323
3	Helio Castroneves (Team Penske)	13.225
22	Oriol Servià (Panther DRR)	13.569

Finals
3	Helio Castroneves (Team Penske)	14.475
10	Dario Franchitti (Chip Ganassi Racing)	14.854

== Starting grid ==
(R) = Indianapolis 500 rookie; (W) = Former Indianapolis 500 winner

Row	Inside		Middle		Outside	
1	20	(United States) Ed Carpenter	26	(Colombia) Carlos Muñoz (R)	25	(United States) Marco Andretti
2	5	(Venezuela) E. J. Viso	2	(United States) A. J. Allmendinger (R)	12	(Australia) Will Power
3	1	(United States) Ryan Hunter-Reay	3	(Brazil) Hélio Castroneves (W)	27	(Canada) James Hinchcliffe
4	4	(United States) J. R. Hildebrand	98	(Canada) Alex Tagliani	11	(Brazil) Tony Kanaan
5	22	(Spain) Oriol Servià	19	(United Kingdom) Justin Wilson	7	(France) Sébastien Bourdais
6	9	(New Zealand) Scott Dixon (W)	10	(United Kingdom) Dario Franchitti (W)	14	(Japan) Takuma Sato
7	83	(United States) Charlie Kimball	16	(United Kingdom) James Jakes	77	(France) Simon Pagenaud
8	60	(United States) Townsend Bell	8	(Australia) Ryan Briscoe	78	(Switzerland) Simona de Silvestro
9	21	(United States) Josef Newgarden	15	(United States) Graham Rahal	6	(Colombia) Sebastián Saavedra
10	55	(France) Tristan Vautier (R)	18	(Brazil) Ana Beatriz	63	(United Kingdom) Pippa Mann
11	41	(United States) Conor Daly (R)	91	(United States) Buddy Lazier (W)	81	(United Kingdom) Katherine Legge

- (W) = Former Indianapolis 500 winner
- (R) = Indianapolis 500 rookie

Failed to qualify

- (Mexico) #17 Michel Jourdain Jr. (no attempt)

== Race summary ==
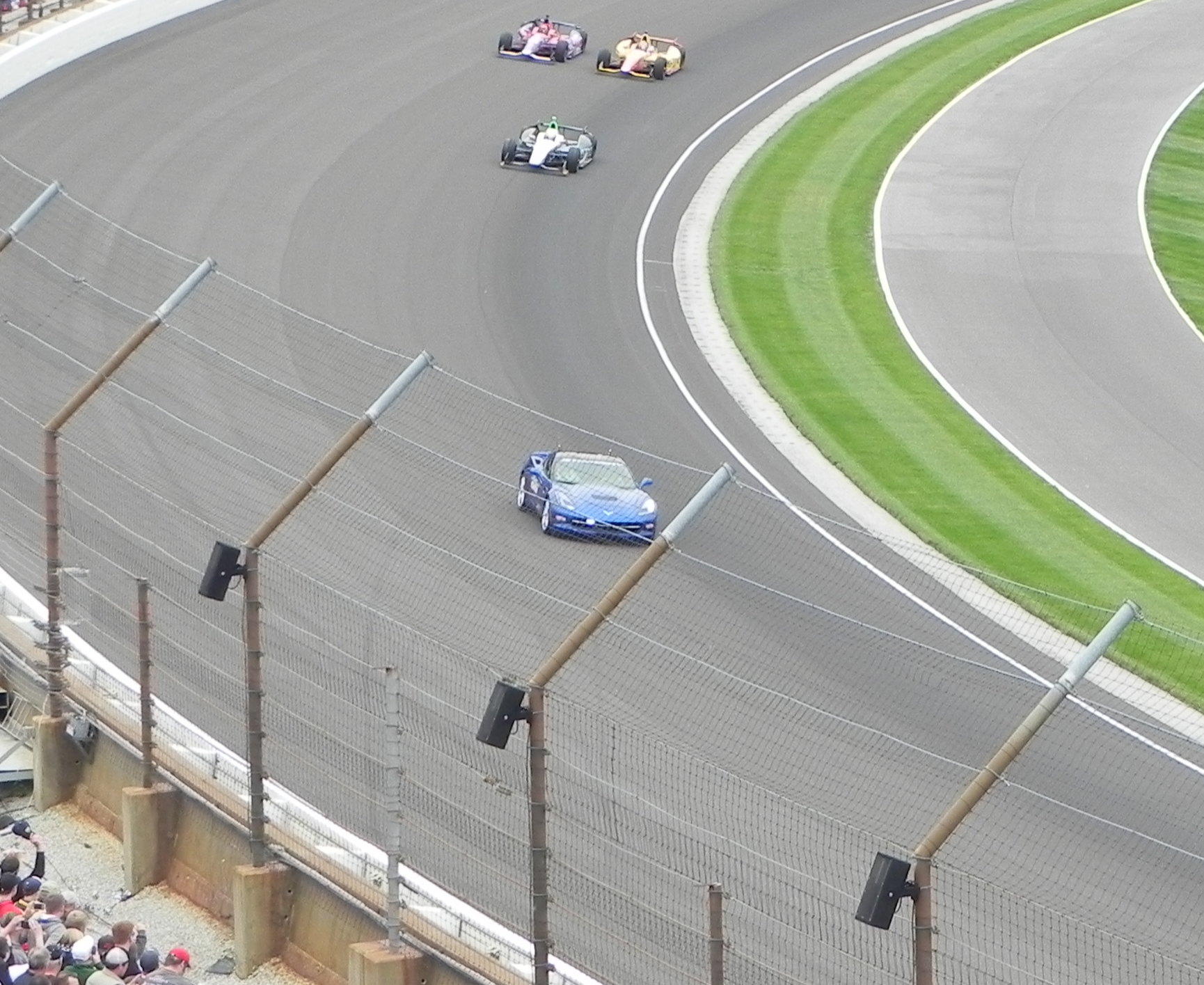
Pace laps

External videos
- 2013 Indy 500 race highlights

=== Start ===
For the first time since 1987, multiple three-time winners of the race were in contention (Franchitti and Castroneves); however, neither driver ended up being a serious threat to win the race. The race started at 12:15 p.m. EDT (4:15 p.m. UTC). Ed Carpenter started in pole position, but Marco Andretti, who started in third position, soon took the lead. The initial start and first laps commenced without any crashes or yellow flags.

=== First half ===
The first caution flag flew when J. R. Hildebrand hit the wall in Turn 2 on the fourth lap of the race, just after posting the fastest time for a lap in the race. Hildebrand had almost won the 2011 Indianapolis 500 but lost due to a crash during the final lap, and then in the 2013 was out of contention after the early crash. On lap 36, driver Sebastián Saavedra was bumped between turns three and four and subsequently crashed into the wall outside of turn four. Driver Pippa Mann later apologized for the accident on her website. The first half of the race featured many lead changes, with Tony Kanaan, Carpenter, and Andretti exchanging the leading spot; however, just before the halfway point in the race, A. J. Allmendinger passed Kanaan to take the lead, with Ryan Hunter-Reay and Andretti following behind in third and fourth, respectively.

=== Second half ===
Allmendinger, leading with under 90 laps to go, had a clasp from his seatbelt come loose and was forced to make a pitstop so his pit crew could refasten it, losing the lead. Driver Graham Rahal then crashed with 7 laps left to go, bringing the race under a yellow caution flag. Ryan Hunter-Reay had been in the lead during this caution flag, but when the caution ended, Kanaan, who ran in the top ten most of the race, slipped by Hunter-Reay to take the lead. Just when Kanaan led in the first turn, Dario Franchitti crashed with three laps left, causing another yellow caution flag that would last for the remainder of the race. Under the yellow flag, Kanaan finished the final 2.5 laps to win his first Indy 500, with Carlos Muñoz in second place and Hunter-Reay in third. The race featured more lead changes than any previous Indianapolis 500 with 68, twice the number of the previous record (34), set in 2012. Kanaan said after the race, "I was looking at the stands, and it was unbelievable ... This is it, man. I made it. Finally they're going to put my ugly face on this trophy".

== Box score ==
Pos	No.	Driver	Team	Chassis	Engine	Laps	Status	Pit stops	Grid	Points
1	11	(Brazil) Tony Kanaan	KV Racing Technology	Dallara DW12	Chevrolet	200	187.433 mph	6	12	55
2	26	(Colombia) Carlos Muñoz R	Andretti Autosport	Dallara DW12	Chevrolet	200	+0.1159	6	2	54
3	1	(United States) Ryan Hunter-Reay	Andretti Autosport	Dallara DW12	Chevrolet	200	+ 0.2480	6	7	44
4	25	(United States) Marco Andretti	Andretti Autosport	Dallara DW12	Chevrolet	200	+0.3634	6	3	45
5	19	(United Kingdom) Justin Wilson	Dale Coyne Racing	Dallara DW12	Honda	200	+0.8138	6	14	34
6	3	(Brazil) Hélio Castroneves W	Team Penske	Dallara DW12	Chevrolet	200	+3.0086	6	8	36
7	2	(United States) A. J. Allmendinger R	Team Penske	Dallara DW12	Chevrolet	200	+4.0107	7	5	37
8	77	(France) Simon Pagenaud	Schmidt Hamilton Motorsports	Dallara DW12	Honda	200	+4.2609	6	21	28
9	83	(United States) Charlie Kimball	Chip Ganassi Racing	Dallara DW12	Honda	200	+5.6864	8	19	26
10	20	(United States) Ed Carpenter	Ed Carpenter Racing	Dallara DW12	Chevrolet	200	+6.8425	6	1	38
11	22	(Spain) Oriol Servià	Panther DRR	Dallara DW12	Chevrolet	200	+7.8633	6	13	23
12	8	(Australia) Ryan Briscoe	Chip Ganassi Racing	Dallara DW12	Honda	200	+8.9216	6	23	22
13	14	(Japan) Takuma Sato	A. J. Foyt Enterprises	Dallara DW12	Honda	200	+10.2602	6	18	21
14	9	(New Zealand) Scott Dixon W	Chip Ganassi Racing	Dallara DW12	Honda	200	+11.3858	6	16	21
15	18	(Brazil) Ana Beatriz	Dale Coyne Racing	Dallara DW12	Honda	200	+12.2657	7	29	18
16	55	(France) Tristan Vautier R	Schmidt Peterson Motorsports	Dallara DW12	Honda	200	+15.3045	6	28	17
17	78	(Switzerland) Simona de Silvestro	KV Racing Technology	Dallara DW12	Chevrolet	200	+15.7201	8	24	17
18	5	(Venezuela) E. J. Viso	Andretti Autosport	Dallara DW12	Chevrolet	200	+17.8056	6	4	24
19	12	(Australia) Will Power	Team Penske	Dallara DW12	Chevrolet	200	+22.5403	7	6	21
20	16	(United Kingdom) James Jakes	Rahal Letterman Lanigan Racing	Dallara DW12	Honda	199	-1 lap	8	20	15
21	27	(Canada) James Hinchcliffe	Andretti Autosport	Dallara DW12	Chevrolet	199	-1 lap	7	9	16
22	41	(United States) Conor Daly R	A. J. Foyt Enterprises	Dallara DW12	Honda	198	-2 laps	7	31	11
23	10	(United Kingdom) Dario Franchitti W	Chip Ganassi Racing	Dallara DW12	Honda	197	Contact	6	17	11
24	98	(Canada) Alex Tagliani	Barracuda Racing	Dallara DW12	Honda	196	-4 laps	6	11	11
25	15	(United States) Graham Rahal	Rahal Letterman Lanigan Racing	Dallara DW12	Honda	193	Contact	7	26	8
26	81	(United Kingdom) Katherine Legge	Schmidt Peterson Motorsports	Dallara DW12	Honda	193	-7 laps	9	33	8
27	60	(United States) Townsend Bell	Panther Racing	Dallara DW12	Chevrolet	192	-8 laps	6	22	10
28	21	(United States) Josef Newgarden	Sarah Fisher Hartman Racing	Dallara DW12	Honda	191	-9 laps	8	25	8
29	7	(France) Sébastien Bourdais	Dragon Racing	Dallara DW12	Chevrolet	178	Contact	5	15	9
30	63	(United Kingdom) Pippa Mann	Dale Coyne Racing	Dallara DW12	Honda	46	Contact	2	30	8
31	91	(United States) Buddy Lazier W	Lazier Partners Racing	Dallara DW12	Chevrolet	44	Mechanical	2	32	8
32	6	(Colombia) Sebastián Saavedra	Dragon Racing	Dallara DW12	Chevrolet	34	Contact	1	27	8
33	4	(United States) J. R. Hildebrand	Panther Racing	Dallara DW12	Chevrolet	3	Contact	0	10	9
Official box score

W Former Indianapolis 500 winner

R Indianapolis 500 Rookie

All entrants utilized Firestone tires.

=== Race statistics ===
- Lead changes: 68 among 14 drivers

Lap leaders
Laps	Leader	Laps	Leader
1–8	Ed Carpenter	123	Alex Tagliani
9	Tony Kanaan	124	Townsend Bell
10–12	Ed Carpenter	125	James Hinchcliffe
13–14	Tony Kanaan	126–130	Marco Andretti
15–16	Marco Andretti	131	Ryan Hunter-Reay
17–20	Tony Kanaan	132–135	E. J. Viso
21–22	Marco Andretti	136	Ryan Hunter-Reay
23	Tony Kanaan	137–142	Allmendinger
24–26	Marco Andretti	143–144	Ryan Hunter-Reay
27–28	Tony Kanaan	145	Hélio Castroneves
29	Marco Andretti	146–150	Marco Andretti
30	Ryan Hunter-Reay	151	Ryan Hunter-Reay
31–32	Will Power	152–154	Carlos Muñoz
33–37	James Jakes	155	Scott Dixon
38–42	Ed Carpenter	156–157	James Hinchcliffe
43	Marco Andretti	158–164	Ryan Hunter-Reay
44–50	Ed Carpenter	165–167	A. J. Allmendinger
51–53	Marco Andretti	168	Marco Andretti
54–58	Ed Carpenter	169	Ryan Hunter-Reay
59–60	Ryan Hunter-Reay	170	Marco Andretti
61	Marco Andretti	171	Ryan Hunter-Reay
62–63	Ryan Hunter-Reay	172–173	Marco Andretti
64–72	Ed Carpenter	174	Tony Kanaan
73–74	Tony Kanaan	175	Marco Andretti
75–88	Will Power	176–177	Tony Kanaan
89	Tony Kanaan	178	Carlos Muñoz
90	E. J. Viso	179	Marco Andretti
91–92	Carlos Muñoz	180–184	Carlos Muñoz
93–97	Tony Kanaan	185–188	James Hinchcliffe
98–111	A. J. Allmendinger	189	Tony Kanaan
112	Tony Kanaan	190	Ryan Hunter-Reay
113–114	Marco Andretti	191–192	Tony Kanaan
115–120	Tony Kanaan	193–197	Ryan Hunter-Reay
121	Ryan Hunter-Reay	198–200	Tony Kanaan
122	Carlos Muñoz		

Total laps led
Driver	Laps
Ed Carpenter	37
Tony Kanaan	34
Marco Andretti	31
Ryan Hunter-Reay	26
A. J. Allmendinger	23
Will Power	16
Carlos Muñoz	12
James Hinchcliffe	7
James Jakes	5
E. J. Viso	5
Hélio Castroneves	1
Townsend Bell	1
Alex Tagliani	1
Scott Dixon	1

Cautions: 5 for 21 laps
Laps	Reason
4–6	J. R. Hildebrand crash in turn 2
35–42	Sebastián Saavedra crash in turn 4
57–60	Takuma Sato spin in turn 2
194–196	Graham Rahal crash in turn 2
198–200	Dario Franchitti crash in turn 1

=== Record and milestones ===
Numerous race records and statistical milestones were set during the race:

- The race was completed in 2 hours, 40 minutes, 3.4181 second at an average speed of 187.433 mph. It was the fastest Indy 500 in history to-date, breaking the record set by Arie Luyendyk in 1990 (185.981 mph). The speed record stood until 2021.
- There were 68 official lead changes, breaking the record of 34 set in 2012. This record still stands as of 2021.
- There were 14 different leaders, breaking the record of 12 set in 1993 (this record was later broken in 2017 and 2018 with 15).
  - Unofficially, there were 84 lead changes between 15 drivers. Lead changes and leaders are only scored at the start/finish line. However, there were 16 additional interim lead changes during the course of the race, and one additional driver, Dario Franchitti, briefly led the field exiting the pit area on lap 189.
- A total of 26 cars were running at the finish, tying the record set in 1911 (40 cars started that year). This record was broken in 2021 (30).
- A total of 19 cars finished on the lead lap, tying the record set in 2009. This record was broken in 2021 (22).
- The 33-car field completed a record total of 5,863 laps out of a possible 6,600 (88.8%). This record was broken in 2021 (6,308).
- There was a green flag stint from lap 61 through 193 (a total of 133 consecutive laps without a caution). That breaks the record in the modern era for most consecutive laps completed without a caution. Since the "pack-up" rule was adopted in 1979, the previous longest stretch of green flags laps occurred in 2002 (74 consecutive laps). Note that this record was later broken in 2014 (149 consecutive laps).
- There were only 21 laps run under caution, breaking the modern era record of 26 set in 1990 for a full 500-mile race. This record was broken in 2021 (18 laps).
- Winner Tony Kanaan won the race in his 12th attempt, matching the mark set by Sam Hanks (1957). Hanks qualified 13 times, but started only 12 due to an injury in 1941.
- Car #11 won for the first time.
- Hélio Castroneves completed the full 500 miles without relief for a record 9th time in his career. Ted Horn and A. J. Foyt had done so eight times.
- Scott Dixon completed the full 500 miles for a record-tying 6th consecutive year.
- Scott Dixon has completed a record 1,566 consecutive laps dating back to the start of the 2006 race.
- Ed Carpenter led the most laps during the race with 37. That is the lowest total by the driver leading the most laps during a single race. In 1996, Roberto Guerrero had previously set that low mark when he led the most laps in 1996, his total was 47.
- There were seven different leaders in a seven-lap stretch during laps 120–126. This betters a mark set in 1981 when there were five different leaders over a five-lap stretch from lap 56–60.
- For the third year in a row, the lead changed hands with less than three laps to go.
- Unknown to all at the time, this would be Dario Franchitti's final Indy 500. On October 6, 2013, Franchitti was involved in a serious crash in the Grand Prix of Houston, when his car flew into catch-fencing after contact with the cars of Takuma Sato and E. J. Viso. Franchitti suffered 2 fractured vertebrae, a broken ankle, and a concussion in the crash. A month later, on 14 November, Franchitti announced his immediate retirement from motor racing on medical advice; he retired with 31 victories from 265 starts in his American open-wheel racing career, a tally which put him in a tie for ninth on the all-time wins list with former teammate Paul Tracy.

Source: Daily Trackside Report

== Broadcasting ==
=== Television ===
The race was broadcast live in high definition in the United States on ABC. A newcomer to the telecast was Lindsay Czarniak, served as host. Brent Musburger, who served as host from 2005 to 2012, departed the broadcast crew.

Australian broadcasts moved to Foxtel for 2013.

Time trials, Carb Day, and the 500 Festival Parade were covered live in the United States on NBC Sports Network. Two separate crews will be used for the qualifying weekend and final practice.

For qualifying, the on-air crew was Leigh Diffey, Gil de Ferran and Jon Beekhuis in the booth, with Kevin Lee, Marty Snider, Robin Miller and Will Buxton in the pits and garage area. de Ferran substituted for regular Townsend Bell, who was participating in the event.

For final practice, the on-air crew was Bob Jenkins, Jon Beekhuis and Wally Dallenbach Jr. in the booth, with pit reporters Snider, Lee and Miller. Jenkins was filling in for Diffey, who was leading NBC's Monaco Grand Prix broadcast. The Freedom 100 was covered by Mike King, Davey Hamilton and Josef Newgarden, with Jake Query covering the pits, and the parade coverage on Saturday was anchored by Jenkins, Diane Willis and Lee.

ABC Television
Booth announcers	Pit/garage reporters
Host: Lindsay Czarniak; Announcer: Marty Reid; Color: Scott Goodyear; Color: Eddie Cheever	Jerry Punch; Vince Welch; Jamie Little; Rick DeBruhl

=== Radio ===
The IMS Radio Network broadcast the race live on approximately 400 affiliates, as well as AFN, the LeSEA broadcasting network, and World Harvest Radio. The broadcast was carried on XM channel 94 and Sirius channel 212. Mike King served as anchor for the 15th and unknown to all final year. King resigned his position in late October 2013. Historian Donald Davidson celebrated his 50th year as an official member of the network broadcast. Several drivers, including A. J. Foyt and Bobby Unser recorded celebratory greetings. The commercial out-cues used in 2013 were the drivers (like 2010) during the pre-race coverage, and the historical chief announcers during the race (like 2011-2012).

Katie Hargitt, who had worked other races during the year as a pit reporter, joined the crew for the first time. Her duties were limited to interviews during the pre-race coverage. During the first half of the race, Mike King interviewed future Vice President of the United States and current Indiana Governor Mike Pence in the broadcast booth.

1070 The Fan broadcast nightly with Trackside with Curt Cavin and Kevin Lee, followed by Donald Davidson's The Talk of Gasoline Alley.

Indianapolis Motor Speedway Radio Network
Booth announcers	Turn reporters	Pit/garage reporters
Chief Announcer: Mike King; Driver expert: Davey Hamilton; Color: Paul Page; Historian: Donald Davidson; Analyst: Jerry Baker	Turn 1: not used Turn 2: Jake Query; Turn 3: Mark Jaynes; Turn 4: Chris Denari	Dave Furst (north pits); Michael Young (north-center pits); Nick Yeoman (south-center pits); Kevin Lee (south pits); Katie Hargitt (pre-race); Dave Wilson (garages)

Previous race: 2013 São Paulo Indy 300	IndyCar Series; 2013 season	Next race: 2013 Detroit Belle Isle Grand Prix
Previous race: 2012 Indianapolis 500	Indianapolis 500	Next race: 2014 Indianapolis 500
Preceded by 185.981 mph (1990 Indianapolis 500)	Record for the Indianapolis 500 fastest average speed 187.433 mph	Succeeded by 190.690 mph 2021 Indianapolis 500
