= James E. Simpson Jr. =

American politician

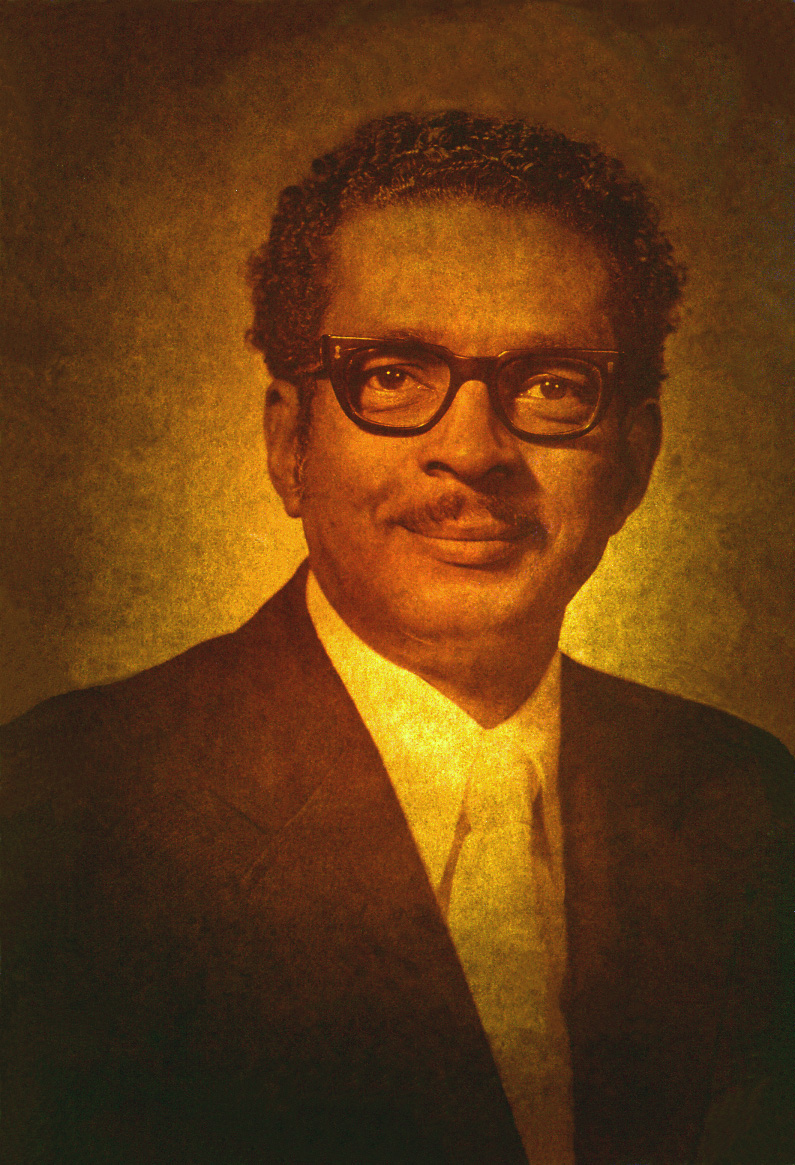
James E Simpson-Jr commissioner photo, city of Covington, 1994.

James Simpson Jr (1928–1999) was the first African American to win a city commission election in the history of Covington, Kentucky. Simpson was one of nearly 30 people who filed to run for the City Commission in 1971. He finished third, winning one of four seats and making political history. Simpson served the full two-year term. He later finished an un-expired term on the commission in 1991. Simpson was active in many other civic groups. He served on the following boards: Kenton County Airport Board (8 years - in 1978 he was elected Chairman), People's Liberty Bank Board of Directors, Booth Hospital in Covington, St. Elizabeth Hospital in Covington and the Kenton County TB Sanatorium. Simpson was also one of the founders of the Northern Kentucky Community Center in the Eastside Neighborhood of Covington. James Edward Simpson Jr is father to State Representative Arnold Ray Simpson who serves the 65th district of Kentucky, the first African American to hold this seat at the Kentucky State Assembly.

== Personal life ==
James Simpson was born on July 24, 1928, in Somerset, Kentucky. Following his education in the public schools, Simpson joined the United States Army in 1947. He took advantage of GI Bill funds to finance his education at the Cincinnati College of Mortuary Science. He graduated with a degree in 1951. In 1952, he began working at the African American C.E. Jones Funeral Home in Covington, which was located at 633 Scott Street. In May, 1961, Anna Jones, the owner of the funeral home retired. At this time, James Simpson took over the operation of the C.E. Jones Funeral Home, the name of which was changed to Jones & Simpson Funeral Home. In 1972, the City of Covington acquired the original funeral home site for additional parking. A new location was found at 1129 Garrard Street. In 1971, James Simpson ran successfully for Covington City Commission.

Simpson had three sons James Simpson – III, (late) Ronald Lee Simpson, Rep. Arnold Ray Simpson (D), and a daughter Adrienne Simpson. His wife Zona Simpson died in 2003. He was known for his jolly laugh and sense of humor. Simpson loved woodworking where he learned cabinet making from Chester Rice at the Lincoln Grant School, a black only school during segregation in Covington. He talked to people about business, about politics, and about how to progress while maintaining one's dignity.

== Death ==
James Simpson Jr. died on February 18, 1999 in his home from complications he suffered from emphysema. He was survived by his widow, Zona Simpson, and four children: James Simpson III, Ronald Simpson, Adrienne Simpson, and Rep Arnold Simpson (D)KY, a former City Manager of Covington and State Representative. Funeral services were held at the First Baptist Church on 9th Street in Covington with burial at Highland Cemetery in Fort Mitchell, Kentucky.

== Accomplishments ==
In 1993, Simpson was one of eight people to receive a Martin Luther King Achievement Award, which were sponsored by the United Community Christian Church Disciples of Christ. He served eight years on the board that operates the Cincinnati/Northern Kentucky Airport, and was its chairman in 1978. He was a trustee for the St. Elizabeth Medical Center board for 17 years, and served on the board of Booth Hospital before that.

Simpson had a special role in Covington's African American community. He helped found the community center, now named for a contemporary, William Martin, who died in 1997. Honored by the Veterans of Foreign Wars Post.

- 1970 - Served as a Deputy Sheriff for Kenton County
- 1971 - Received United Funeral Directors Of Greater Cincinnati 50 Year Service Award
- 1973 - Appointed to the Board of Directors of the Kenton County Airport (CVG)
- 1978 - Elected Chairman of the Kenton County Airport Board of Directors (CVG)
- 1977 - Named to St. Elizabeth Medical Center Board of Directors
- 1978 - Named to Peoples Liberty Bank Board Of Directors
- 1982 - Received Northern Kentucky Community Center Service Award
- 1989 - Received St. Elizabeth Medical Center Service Award
- 1990 - Elected to Covington Black Hall Of Fame
- 1991 - Received Star Bank Service Award
- 1991 - Received Covington City Commission Outstanding Service Award
- 2000 - Nominated to Kentucky Human Rights Commission Hall Of Fame
- 2001 - Nominated to Kentucky Human Rights Commission Hall Of Fame
- 2001 - Namesake nominated for the Licking River bridge connecting 12th Street to Newport.
- 2008 - Namesake attached to street linking new St. Elizabeth Medical Center in Covington.

He also served on the Board Of Trustees at the First Baptist Church, Kenton County Sheriff's Office as Deputy Sheriff, Covington Civil Service Commission, GC/NKY Airport Board, NKY Community Center, St. Elizabeth Hospital Board, Star Bank Board, NKY Health/Welfare Planning Board, and many more.

== Honored by street in Covington ==
In 2008 the City of Covington voted to name the street leading to the main entrance of the new St. Elizabeth hospital (finished in 2009) as "James Simpson Jr Way" in honor of James Simpson Jr.

== Additional sources ==
- Kentucky Enquirer, November 3, 1971, p. 1A
- Kentucky Post, February 2, 1987, p. 4K, February 20, 1999, p. 13A, February 23, 1999, p. 2K, June 28, 2001, p. 3K
