= James Young Simpson (minister) =

Scottish-Australian minister (c. 1843–1898)

Rev. James Young Simpson (c. 1843 – 10 September 1898) was a Wesleyan Methodist minister in South Australia, born in Scotland, a nephew and namesake of James Young Simpson, the celebrated pioneer of chloroform as an anaesthetic.

== History ==
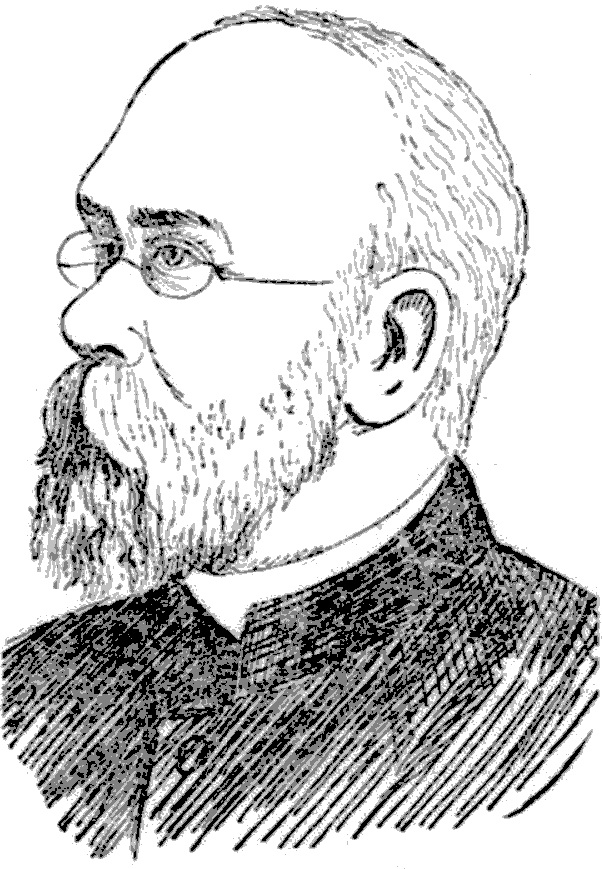
Rev J. Young Simpson

Simpson was born in Scotland, a son of David Simpson (c. 1804–1865) and grandson of David Simpson (1760-1830). The family emigrated to Victoria, Australia, aboard the Storm Queen, from the Clyde, departing 16 March 1858, and arriving Melbourne on 27 June 1858 with cargo and the Simpson family.

He was raised a Presbyterian, but became a member of the Wesleyan Methodist communion and in 1866 joined the ministry in Victoria. His first appointment was to the Geelong church, then in April 1867 was sent over the border to Norwood, South Australia replacing Rev. J. D. Robin, who was off to Tasmania. The Methodist churches had a principle of moving their pastors regularly, and in December 1869 he was sent by the Stationing Committee to Port Wallaroo, stopping for a few days at Moonta, where he regaled the (mostly Cornish) miners with a humorous talk on Scotland, possibly the same one he gave at Wallaroo a week later. The following year he had charge of the Wesleyan chapel at Strathalbyn, where he and Rev. Backhouse of the Presbyterian congregation cheerfully swapped pulpits on occasion. Simpson's stay in Strathalbyn culminated in the erection of a new chapel and his marriage to the only daughter of Captain R. M. Phillips, of Clapton Park, London.

Simpson's next charge was the old Wesleyan church near the gasworks, Brompton, South Australia, when a replacement was in process; the new one on the Port Road had its foundation stone laid on 22 March 1875 and Simpson preached the first sermon there a year later, on 3 March 1876. His next posting was to Gawler in 1876. He was elected President of the Wesleyan Conference of South Australia 1877. He was next called to the Mount Gambier circuit, raising the stipend to £250 per annum. At the 1881 conference he was given the Norwood church and in 1883 appointed Secretary and Convener of the Probationers' Examination Committee; he returned to the Mount Gambier circuit as a deputy for the British and Foreign Bible Society. At the 1884 conference he was, by an overwhelming vote, elected Secretary and given charge of the Draper Memorial church in the city. In 1887 he was elected president and given the Glenelg church.

In March 1890 he left South Australia for an appointment as chairman of the Western Australian district, which then in the South Australian conference, and superintendent of the Perth circuit. At the end of his three-year appointment he requested a return to South Australia in the hope it would benefit his wife's deteriorating health. Consequently, he was given oversight of the Prospect circuit, which encompassed Port Adelaide and Semaphore in 1893. Mrs Simpson, whose health had deteriorated while in Perth, died at Prospect in September 1895 aged 52. In 1896 Simpson was appointed to the Kooringa church, Kooringa being the town attached to the Burra. This was around the time of Methodist Union which entailed rationalizing of redundant assets of the Wesleyan and Bible Christian churches, and many hard decisions had to be made and implemented. 1898 was the Jubilee year of the Burra church, and he was active in organising celebrations, which included editing a compendium of oral histories from the many ministers who had experiences of the Burra churches.

Around this time his health began to suffer. He had a tendency to obesity, probably inherited, and his medical advisers were concerned for his heart. In August 1898 his case became so serious he was unable to perform his usual duties, and despite an apparent rallying, he died suddenly and unexpectedly on the evening of 10 September 1898. His doctors were called but he was dead when they arrived.

== Family ==
Simpson's father, David Simpson (c. 1804 – 26 March 1865), died at his home, Lonsdale Street, Hamilton, Victoria.

Simpson married Martha Jane Phillips (c. 1843 – 2 September 1895) on 7 April 1874. Martha was only daughter of Captain R M. Phillips, Clapton Park, London. This was the first marriage solemnised in the Wesleyan Church, Strathalbyn.

- David James Simpson (4 October 1875 – 1931)
- Robert Gawler Simpson (30 April 1877 – )
- Martha Doris "Patty" Simpson (27 February 1879 – 9 March 1953)
- Ruth Norwood Simpson (5 May 1881 – ) married Ewart E. Harris of Kent on 4 April 1917

He had three sisters in Adelaide, of whom two married brothers of his wife; both partners in the firm of D. & J. Fowler Ltd.

- Grace Ann Simpson ( – 1905) married his brother-in-law Robert James Phillips (c. 1847 – 9 February 1913) on 3 January 1876. They had a daughter Helen Young Phillips.
- Jane Eliza Young "Jeanie" Simpson ( – 12 April 1926) married his brother-in-law James Howard Phillips (c. 1850 – 12 November 1906) on 10 June 1875.

The third was living in Kooringa at the time of her brother's last illness, and may have been nursing him:

- Helen Young Simpson (c. 1836 – 10 April 1920) In a newspaper interview she recounted memories of her famous Uncle James.
