= 2016 Citizen Soldier 400 =

Race details
- Race 29 of 36 in the 2016 NASCAR Sprint Cup Series
- Date: October 2, 2016
- Location: Dover International Speedway in Dover, Delaware
- Course: Permanent racing facility
- Course length: 1 miles (1.6 km)
- Distance: 400 laps, 400 mi (640 km)
- Weather: Cloudy with a temperature of 73 °F (23 °C); wind out of the northeast at 5 mph (8.0 km/h)
- Average speed: 130.969 miles per hour (210.774 km/h)

Pole position
Driver	Brad Keselowski	Team Penske
- Time: N/A

Most laps led
Driver	Martin Truex Jr.	Furniture Row Racing
- Laps: 187

Winner
No. 78	Martin Truex Jr.	Furniture Row Racing

Television in the United States
- Network: NBCSN
- Announcers: Rick Allen, Jeff Burton and Steve Letarte

Radio in the United States
- Radio: MRN
- Booth announcers: Joe Moore, Jeff Striegle and Rusty Wallace
- Turn announcers: Mike Bagley (Backstretch)

The 2016 Citizen Soldier 400 was a NASCAR Sprint Cup Series race that was held on October 2, 2016, at Dover International Speedway in Dover, Delaware. Contested over 400 laps on the one-mile (1.6 km) concrete speedway, it was the 29th race of the 2016 NASCAR Sprint Cup Series season, third race of the Chase and final race of the Round of 16.

== Entry list ==
No.	Driver	Team	Manufacturer
1	Jamie McMurray	Chip Ganassi Racing	Chevrolet
2	Brad Keselowski	Team Penske	Ford
3	Austin Dillon	Richard Childress Racing	Chevrolet
4	Kevin Harvick	Stewart–Haas Racing	Chevrolet
5	Kasey Kahne	Hendrick Motorsports	Chevrolet
6	Trevor Bayne	Roush Fenway Racing	Ford
7	Regan Smith	Tommy Baldwin Racing	Chevrolet
10	Danica Patrick	Stewart–Haas Racing	Chevrolet
11	Denny Hamlin	Joe Gibbs Racing	Toyota
13	Casey Mears	Germain Racing	Chevrolet
14	Tony Stewart	Stewart–Haas Racing	Chevrolet
15	Clint Bowyer	HScott Motorsports	Chevrolet
16	Greg Biffle	Roush Fenway Racing	Ford
17	Ricky Stenhouse Jr.	Roush Fenway Racing	Ford
18	Kyle Busch	Joe Gibbs Racing	Toyota
19	Carl Edwards	Joe Gibbs Racing	Toyota
20	Matt Kenseth	Joe Gibbs Racing	Toyota
21	Ryan Blaney (R)	Wood Brothers Racing	Ford
22	Joey Logano	Team Penske	Ford
23	David Ragan	BK Racing	Toyota
24	Chase Elliott (R)	Hendrick Motorsports	Chevrolet
27	Paul Menard	Richard Childress Racing	Chevrolet
30	Josh Wise	The Motorsports Group	Chevrolet
31	Ryan Newman	Richard Childress Racing	Chevrolet
32	Jeffrey Earnhardt (R)	Go FAS Racing	Ford
34	Chris Buescher (R)	Front Row Motorsports	Ford
38	Landon Cassill	Front Row Motorsports	Ford
41	Kurt Busch	Stewart–Haas Racing	Chevrolet
42	Kyle Larson	Chip Ganassi Racing	Chevrolet
43	Aric Almirola	Richard Petty Motorsports	Ford
44	Brian Scott (R)	Richard Petty Motorsports	Ford
46	Michael Annett	HScott Motorsports	Chevrolet
47	A. J. Allmendinger	JTG Daugherty Racing	Chevrolet
48	Jimmie Johnson	Hendrick Motorsports	Chevrolet
55	Reed Sorenson	Premium Motorsports	Chevrolet
78	Martin Truex Jr.	Furniture Row Racing	Toyota
83	Matt DiBenedetto	BK Racing	Toyota
88	Jeff Gordon	Hendrick Motorsports	Chevrolet
95	Ty Dillon (i)	Circle Sport – Leavine Family Racing	Chevrolet
98	Timmy Hill (i)	Premium Motorsports	Chevrolet
Official entry list

== Practice ==
=== First practice ===
Kyle Larson was the fastest in the first practice session with a time of 21.742 and a speed of 165.578 mph (266.472 km/h).

Pos	No.	Driver	Team	Manufacturer	Time	Speed
1	42	Kyle Larson	Chip Ganassi Racing	Chevrolet	21.742	165.578
2	19	Carl Edwards	Joe Gibbs Racing	Toyota	21.802	165.122
3	20	Matt Kenseth	Joe Gibbs Racing	Toyota	21.848	164.775
Official first practice results

=== Second practice ===
Jeff Gordon was the fastest in the second practice session with a time of 22.428 and a speed of 160.514 mph (258.322 km/h).

Pos	No.	Driver	Team	Manufacturer	Time	Speed
1	88	Jeff Gordon	Hendrick Motorsports	Chevrolet	22.428	160.514
2	17	Ricky Stenhouse Jr.	Roush Fenway Racing	Ford	22.555	159.610
3	31	Ryan Newman	Richard Childress Racing	Chevrolet	22.582	159.419
Official second practice results

=== Final practice ===
Final practice was cancelled due to rain.

== Qualifying ==
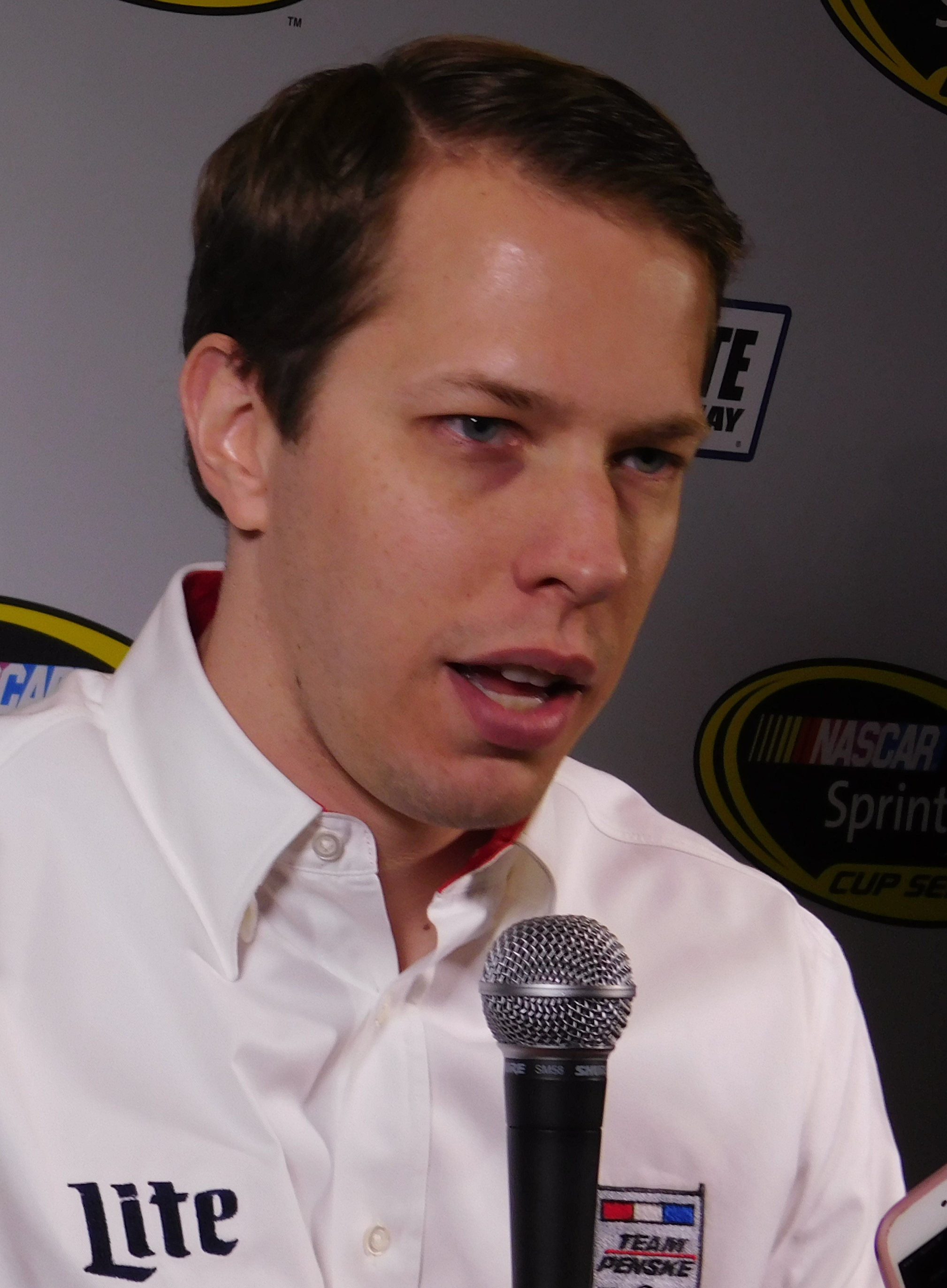
Brad Keselowski won the pole.

Qualifying for Friday was cancelled due to rain. Brad Keselowski was awarded the pole position as a result.

=== Starting lineup ===
Pos	No.	Driver	Team	Manufacturer
1	2	Brad Keselowski	Team Penske	Ford
2	78	Martin Truex Jr.	Furniture Row Racing	Toyota
3	18	Kyle Busch	Joe Gibbs Racing	Toyota
4	20	Matt Kenseth	Joe Gibbs Racing	Toyota
5	22	Joey Logano	Team Penske	Ford
6	4	Kevin Harvick	Stewart–Haas Racing	Chevrolet
7	11	Denny Hamlin	Joe Gibbs Racing	Toyota
8	48	Jimmie Johnson	Hendrick Motorsports	Chevrolet
9	24	Chase Elliott (R)	Hendrick Motorsports	Chevrolet
10	19	Carl Edwards	Joe Gibbs Racing	Toyota
11	41	Kurt Busch	Stewart–Haas Racing	Chevrolet
12	42	Kyle Larson	Chip Ganassi Racing	Chevrolet
13	1	Jamie McMurray	Chip Ganassi Racing	Chevrolet
14	3	Austin Dillon	Richard Childress Racing	Chevrolet
15	14	Tony Stewart	Stewart–Haas Racing	Chevrolet
16	34	Chris Buescher (R)	Front Row Motorsports	Ford
17	5	Kasey Kahne	Hendrick Motorsports	Chevrolet
18	88	Jeff Gordon	Hendrick Motorsports	Chevrolet
19	31	Ryan Newman	Richard Childress Racing	Chevrolet
20	21	Ryan Blaney (R)	Wood Brothers Racing	Ford
21	47	A. J. Allmendinger	JTG Daugherty Racing	Chevrolet
22	17	Ricky Stenhouse Jr.	Roush Fenway Racing	Ford
23	6	Trevor Bayne	Roush Fenway Racing	Ford
24	10	Danica Patrick	Stewart–Haas Racing	Chevrolet
25	16	Greg Biffle	Roush Fenway Racing	Ford
26	27	Paul Menard	Richard Childress Racing	Chevrolet
27	43	Aric Almirola	Richard Petty Motorsports	Ford
28	15	Clint Bowyer	HScott Motorsports	Chevrolet
29	13	Casey Mears	Germain Racing	Chevrolet
30	95	Ty Dillon (i)	Circle Sport – Leavine Family Racing	Chevrolet
31	38	Landon Cassill	Front Row Motorsports	Ford
32	23	David Ragan	BK Racing	Toyota
33	7	Regan Smith	Tommy Baldwin Racing	Chevrolet
34	44	Brian Scott (R)	Richard Petty Motorsports	Ford
35	83	Matt DiBenedetto	BK Racing	Toyota
36	98	Timmy Hill (i)	Premium Motorsports	Chevrolet
37	46	Michael Annett	HScott Motorsports	Chevrolet
38	32	Jeffrey Earnhardt (R)	Go FAS Racing	Ford
39	55	Reed Sorenson	Premium Motorsports	Chevrolet
40	30	Josh Wise	The Motorsports Group	Chevrolet
Official starting lineup

== Race ==
=== First half ===
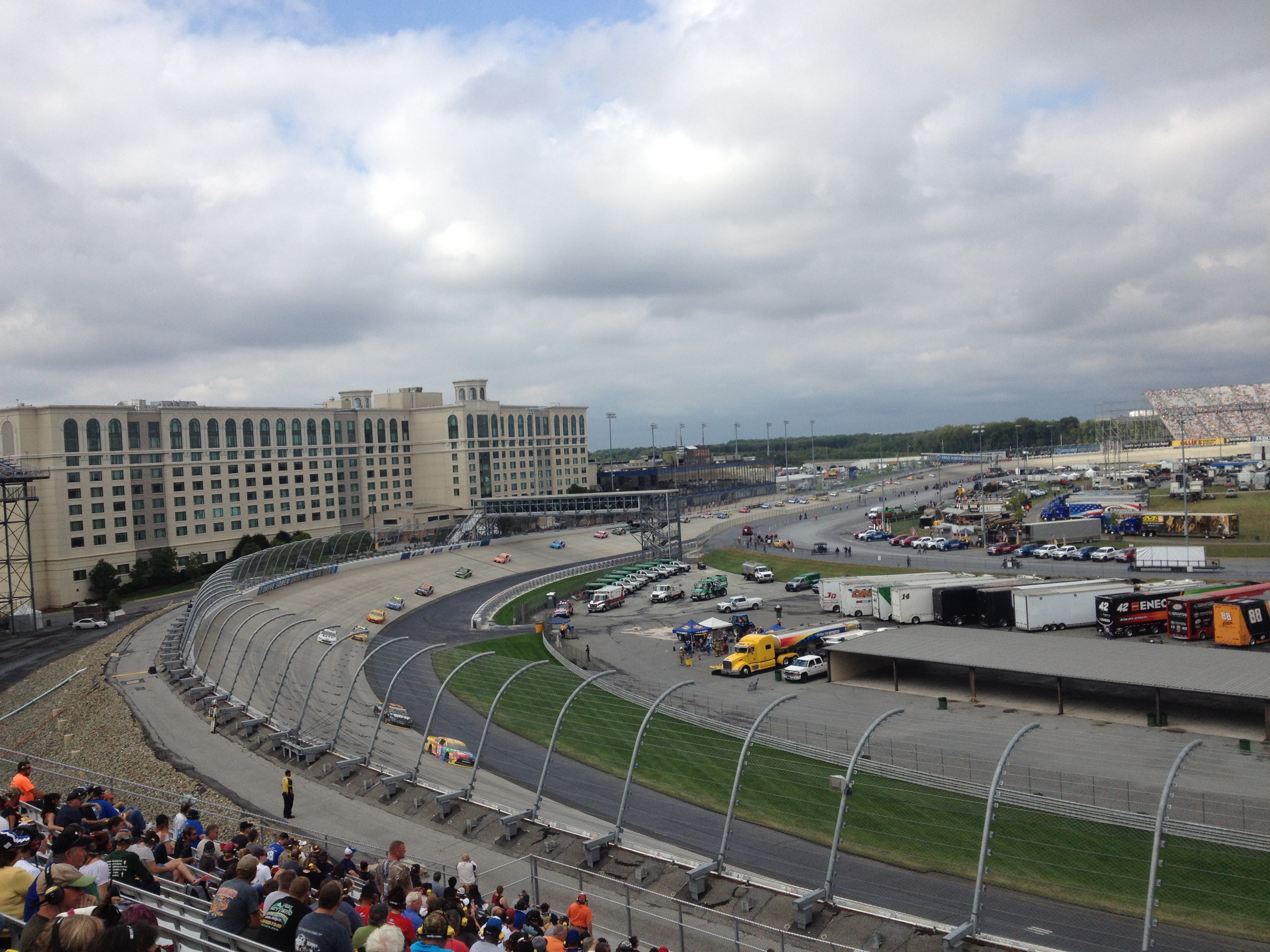
Kyle Busch leads during the first half of the race

Under overcast Delaware skies, Brad Keselowski led the field to the green flag at 2:17 p.m. He held the lead for the first few laps until Martin Truex Jr. passed him going into turn 1 with ease to take the lead on the seventh lap. Kyle Busch powered by Truex in turn 2 on the outside to take the lead on lap 21. Debris coming from Kevin Harvick's car brought out the first caution of the race on lap 34. The issue was a flat right-rear tire related to a broken track bar mount. Trevor Bayne was sent to the tail end of the field for speeding on pit road. Kyle Larson fell down a lap after making a stop to deal with electrical issues. He said after the race that he didn't "know what happened with the battery or whatever. If we didn’t have the (penalty), we probably would have been alright because I was only a lap down. Nice little Christmas present for Austin (Dillon) there with both Ganassi cars going down."

The race restarted on lap 40. Busch held the lead for nearly 40 laps before Truex retook it on lap 80, but Busch powered by him to take it back on lap 81. The second caution of the race flew on lap 104 for Ryan Blaney hitting the wall exiting turn 2.

The race restarted on lap 111. Truex worked under Busch in turn 2 to retake the lead on lap 130. Jamie McMurray was running 10th when he reported engine issues and started falling back on lap 167. The third caution of the race flew on lap 182 for Larson suffering a right-front tire blowout and slamming the wall in turn 1. He said afterwards that there wasn't much he "could do. I cut the right-front tire down and got in the wall and still had good speed in the race car after that but it just didn’t work out. Our team has come a long way this season from where we started the year. We were pretty awful at the start of the season but then got a win at Michigan to lock ourselves in the Chase. That was good. I know we have the speed to have made it past a couple of rounds but it’s my typical luck I guess, where it just doesn’t work out.”

The race restarted on lap 190. Jimmie Johnson beat Truex on the restart to take the lead on the ensuing lap. McMurray brought out the fourth caution of the race after suffering an engine failure on the frontstretch. He said afterwards that the engine "vibrated earlier in the race and it went away. And it's weird because engine issues usually don't go away. It felt like it had power and then I don't know about 40 laps before it finally blew up, it just started vibrating real bad. Very unfortunate. It is just the way it goes. The No. 42 had their problem early in the race and then at that point I'm like, ‘Well it's kind of Austin (Dillon) and I that are going to battle this out.’ Our cars are pretty close so this is going to be a pretty good battle down to the end.” He also added that keeping the car out as long as he did with engine issues was "wishful thinking at that point. No one wants to stay out and blow up, not to oil the track down. Also it's hard to diagnose the problem if the motor's blown up. Because you're in a position this weekend where you just have to go for it and what you hope is you've got something as simple as a plug wire or a spark plug that you can replace and the motor's not going to grenade. We came here and looked at it, and actually on the digital dash, we have a little diagnosis page and nothing is showing up, so we didn't know what was wrong. We were just going to salvage as long as we could." He went on to finish 40th.

=== Second half ===
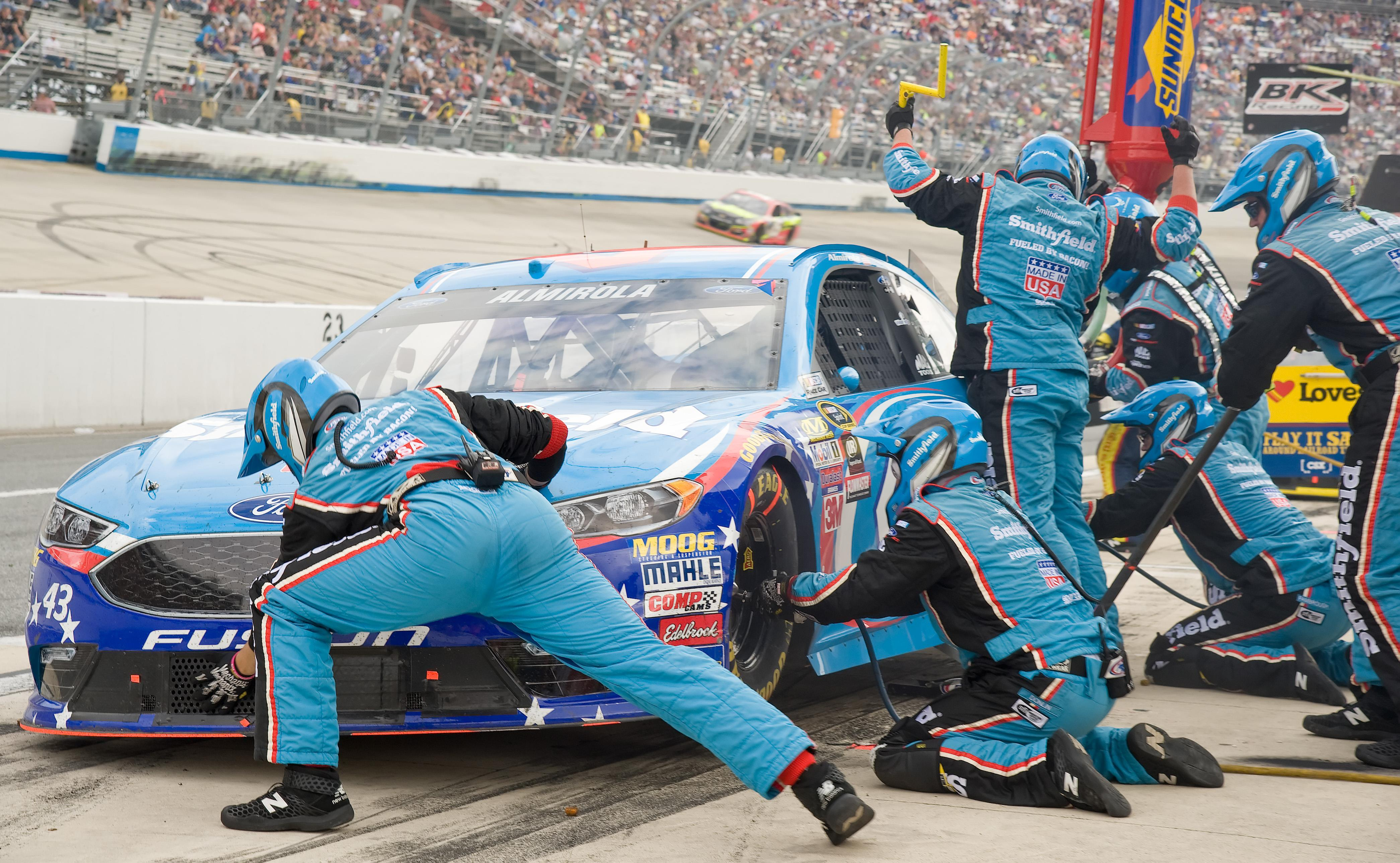
Almirola comes in for a pit stop

The race restarted on lap 199. Green flag stops started on lap 277. Johnson pitted from the lead on lap 279 and handed it to Keselowski. He pitted the next lap and handed the lead to Greg Biffle. He pitted on lap 287 and the lead cycled to Truex. Johnson was handed a pass through penalty for his crew being over the wall too soon. After the race, he said that what happened was "a unique circumstance on pit road. We had the No. 18 in the pit before us getting ready to pull out, the No. 43 leaving his stall. I got slowed up and had to check up and get behind two cars and unfortunately, I think it just threw the rhythm off of the pit stop."

The final round of green flag stops began with 43 laps to go. Truex pitted from the lead with 36 laps to go and handed it to Johnson. He pitted with 34 to go and handed the lead to Jeff Gordon. He pitted with 27 laps to go and the lead cycled back to Truex. David Ragan was handed a pass through penalty for speeding on pit road.

Truex drove on to score the victory.

== Post-race ==
=== Driver comments ===
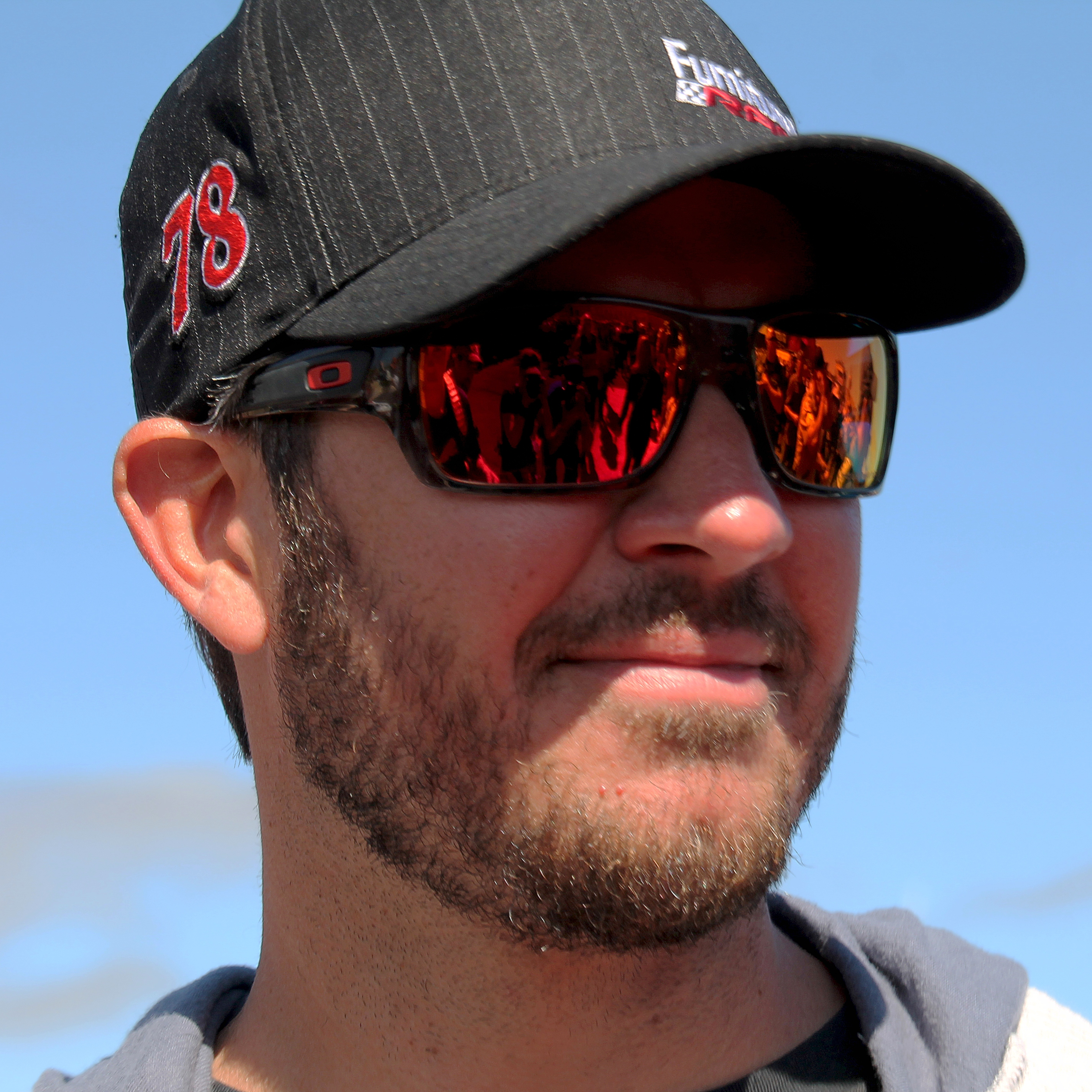
Martin Truex Jr. won the race.

Truex said in victory lane that he "can't even believe it man -- it’s just living a dream right now. It’s a fairytale. I don’t even know what to say" and that his team just needs "to go out there each week and try to be as prepared as we can. We’re not going to change who we are. We didn’t do that before the Chase started. We just got hot and we got momentum, and hopefully we don’t lose it. I mean, I don’t know how we got it, I don’t know how to keep it, I just know that we’re going to continue to approach these races the same way, and hopefully it works out for us.”

“What an awesome weekend for us, I love this place,” he added in the media center following the race. “I’ve had a lot of heartbreaks since my first win here back in ’07. I’ve had a lot of heartbreaks. I’ve led a lot of laps. I’ve been in position to win multiple times, and it never seemed to work out for multiple reasons. Today I’m just thankful to have a great team, to have been able to lead lap 400 and get back to victory lane at a track that’s so special to me.”

After advancing into the Round of 12 with an eighth-place finish, Austin Dillon said that his team "just stayed focused, and once again, God just blessed us because I'm still awestruck. Things like this just don't happen. I'm proud to be going on to the final 12 and having race cars that are capable of keep on moving on.”

Following his first top-10 finish in relief for Dale Earnhardt Jr., Gordon said of his 10th-place finish that he "felt like we had a really good race car all weekend long,’’ Gordon told NBC Sports after the race. “I realized real early on we were going to have our work cut out for us, starting 18th. It was really tough getting through traffic. I kind of led them down a path. We were loose that first run and over-tightened it and that didn’t do us any favors. But we got it tuned up and had some great pit stops and got our way into the top 10. I wanted to get a top-10 in this car before my time in the car is over. We got that. Now let’s go get a top-five or something better at Martinsville.’’

"We were much better than we were yesterday [in practice]," Tony Stewart said after being knocked out of his final Chase appearance with a 13th-place finish. "[I'm] really proud of our team. We kept making it better all day. That is good as we had."

== Race results ==
Pos	No.	Driver	Team	Manufacturer	Laps	Points
1	78	Martin Truex Jr.	Furniture Row Racing	Toyota	400	45
2	18	Kyle Busch	Joe Gibbs Racing	Toyota	400	40
3	24	Chase Elliott (R)	Hendrick Motorsports	Chevrolet	400	38
4	2	Brad Keselowski	Team Penske	Ford	400	38
5	20	Matt Kenseth	Joe Gibbs Racing	Toyota	400	36
6	22	Joey Logano	Team Penske	Ford	400	35
7	48	Jimmie Johnson	Hendrick Motorsports	Chevrolet	399	35
8	3	Austin Dillon	Richard Childress Racing	Chevrolet	399	33
9	11	Denny Hamlin	Joe Gibbs Racing	Toyota	399	32
10	88	Jeff Gordon	Hendrick Motorsports	Chevrolet	399	32
11	17	Ricky Stenhouse Jr.	Roush Fenway Racing	Ford	399	30
12	5	Kasey Kahne	Hendrick Motorsports	Chevrolet	399	29
13	14	Tony Stewart	Stewart–Haas Racing	Chevrolet	399	28
14	19	Carl Edwards	Joe Gibbs Racing	Toyota	399	27
15	41	Kurt Busch	Stewart–Haas Racing	Chevrolet	398	26
16	43	Aric Almirola	Richard Petty Motorsports	Ford	398	25
17	31	Ryan Newman	Richard Childress Racing	Chevrolet	397	24
18	16	Greg Biffle	Roush Fenway Racing	Ford	396	24
19	47	A. J. Allmendinger	JTG Daugherty Racing	Chevrolet	396	22
20	6	Trevor Bayne	Roush Fenway Racing	Ford	395	21
21	44	Brian Scott (R)	Richard Petty Motorsports	Ford	395	20
22	27	Paul Menard	Richard Childress Racing	Chevrolet	395	19
23	34	Chris Buescher (R)	Front Row Motorsports	Ford	394	18
24	15	Clint Bowyer	HScott Motorsports	Chevrolet	394	17
25	42	Kyle Larson	Chip Ganassi Racing	Chevrolet	394	16
26	13	Casey Mears	Germain Racing	Chevrolet	394	15
27	83	Matt DiBenedetto	BK Racing	Toyota	393	14
28	10	Danica Patrick	Stewart–Haas Racing	Chevrolet	393	13
29	38	Landon Cassill	Front Row Motorsports	Ford	392	12
30	23	David Ragan	BK Racing	Toyota	392	11
31	7	Regan Smith	Tommy Baldwin Racing	Chevrolet	391	10
32	95	Ty Dillon (i)	Circle Sport – Leavine Family Racing	Chevrolet	390	0
33	46	Michael Annett	HScott Motorsports	Chevrolet	387	8
34	98	Timmy Hill (i)	Premium Motorsports	Chevrolet	386	0
35	55	Reed Sorenson	Premium Motorsports	Chevrolet	385	6
36	32	Jeffrey Earnhardt (R)	Go FAS Racing	Ford	384	5
37	4	Kevin Harvick	Stewart–Haas Racing	Chevrolet	354	4
38	21	Ryan Blaney (R)	Wood Brothers Racing	Ford	281	3
39	30	Josh Wise	The Motorsports Group	Chevrolet	196	2
40	1	Jamie McMurray	Chip Ganassi Racing	Chevrolet	192	1
Official race results

=== Race summary ===
- Lead changes: 6 among different drivers
- Cautions/Laps: 4 for 22
- Red flags: 0
- Time of race: 3 hours, 3 minutes and 15 seconds
- Average speed: 130.969 miles per hour (210.774 km/h)

== Media ==
=== Television ===
NBCSN covered the race on the television side. Rick Allen, Jeff Burton, and Steve Letarte had the call in the booth for the race. Dave Burns, Mike Massaro, Marty Snider and Kelli Stavast handled pit road on the television side.

NBCSN
Booth announcers	Pit reporters
Lap-by-lap: Rick Allen; Color-commentator: Jeff Burton; Color-commentator: Steve Letarte	Dave Burns; Mike Massaro; Marty Snider; Kelli Stavast

=== Radio ===
MRN had the radio call for the race, which was simulcast on Sirius XM NASCAR Radio.

MRN
Booth announcers	Turn announcers	Pit reporters
Lead announcer: Joe Moore; Announcer: Jeff Striegle; Announcer: Rusty Wallace	Backstretch: Mike Bagley	Alex Hayden; Winston Kelley; Steve Post

== Standings after the race ==
Drivers' Championship standings

	Pos	Driver	Points
1	1	Martin Truex Jr.	3,000
4	2	Kevin Harvick	3,000 (–0)
	3	Kyle Busch	3,000 (–0)
	4	Matt Kenseth	3,000 (–0)
	5	Joey Logano	3,000 (–0)
3	6	Chase Elliott	3,000 (–0)
6	7	Brad Keselowski	3,000 (–0)
3	8	Kurt Busch	3,000 (–0)
2	9	Denny Hamlin	3,000 (–0)
	10	Carl Edwards	3,000 (–0)
3	11	Jimmie Johnson	3,000 (–0)
1	12	Austin Dillon	3,000 (–0)
2	13	Tony Stewart	2,074 (–926)
2	14	Kyle Larson	2,073 (–927)
1	15	Jamie McMurray	2,053 (–947)
	16	Chris Buescher	2,045 (–955)
Official driver's standings

Manufacturers' Championship standings

Pos	Manufacturer	Points
1	Toyota	1,201
2	Chevrolet	1,166 (–35)
3	Ford	1,110 (–91)
Official manufacturers' standings

- Note: Only the first 16 positions are included for the driver standings.

Previous race: 2016 Bad Boy Off Road 300	Sprint Cup Series; 2016 season	Next race: 2016 Bank of America 500
