= 2016 Bank of America 500 =

Race details
- Race 30 of 36 in the 2016 NASCAR Sprint Cup Series
- Date: October 9, 2016 (postponed from October 8, 2016)
- Location: Charlotte Motor Speedway in Concord, North Carolina
- Course: Permanent racing facility
- Course length: 1.5 miles (2.4 km)
- Distance: 334 laps, 501 mi (801.6 km)
- Average speed: 134.929 miles per hour (217.147 km/h)

Pole position
Driver	Kevin Harvick	Stewart–Haas Racing
- Time: 27.547

Most laps led
Driver	Jimmie Johnson	Hendrick Motorsports
- Laps: 155

Winner
No. 48	Jimmie Johnson	Hendrick Motorsports

Television in the United States
- Network: NBC
- Announcers: Rick Allen, Jeff Burton and Steve Letarte

Radio in the United States
- Radio: PRN
- Booth announcers: Doug Rice, Mark Garrow and Wendy Venturini
- Turn announcers: Rob Albright (1 & 2) and Pat Patterson (3 & 4)

The 2016 Bank of America 500 was a NASCAR Sprint Cup Series race that was scheduled to be held on October 8, 2016, but was postponed to October 9, 2016, because of Hurricane Matthew, at Charlotte Motor Speedway in Concord, North Carolina. Contested over 334 laps on the 1.5 mile (2.4 km) intermediate speedway, it was the 30th race of the 2016 NASCAR Sprint Cup Series season, fourth race of the Chase, and first race of the Round of 12.

== Entry list ==
No.	Driver	Team	Manufacturer
1	Jamie McMurray	Chip Ganassi Racing	Chevrolet
2	Brad Keselowski	Team Penske	Ford
3	Austin Dillon	Richard Childress Racing	Chevrolet
4	Kevin Harvick	Stewart–Haas Racing	Chevrolet
5	Kasey Kahne	Hendrick Motorsports	Chevrolet
6	Trevor Bayne	Roush Fenway Racing	Ford
7	Regan Smith	Tommy Baldwin Racing	Chevrolet
10	Danica Patrick	Stewart–Haas Racing	Chevrolet
11	Denny Hamlin	Joe Gibbs Racing	Toyota
13	Casey Mears	Germain Racing	Chevrolet
14	Tony Stewart	Stewart–Haas Racing	Chevrolet
15	Clint Bowyer	HScott Motorsports	Chevrolet
16	Greg Biffle	Roush Fenway Racing	Ford
17	Ricky Stenhouse Jr.	Roush Fenway Racing	Ford
18	Kyle Busch	Joe Gibbs Racing	Toyota
19	Carl Edwards	Joe Gibbs Racing	Toyota
20	Matt Kenseth	Joe Gibbs Racing	Toyota
21	Ryan Blaney (R)	Wood Brothers Racing	Ford
22	Joey Logano	Team Penske	Ford
23	David Ragan	BK Racing	Toyota
24	Chase Elliott (R)	Hendrick Motorsports	Chevrolet
27	Paul Menard	Richard Childress Racing	Chevrolet
30	Josh Wise	The Motorsports Group	Chevrolet
31	Ryan Newman	Richard Childress Racing	Chevrolet
32	Jeffrey Earnhardt (R)	Go FAS Racing	Ford
34	Chris Buescher (R)	Front Row Motorsports	Ford
38	Landon Cassill	Front Row Motorsports	Ford
41	Kurt Busch	Stewart–Haas Racing	Chevrolet
42	Kyle Larson	Chip Ganassi Racing	Chevrolet
43	Aric Almirola	Richard Petty Motorsports	Ford
44	Brian Scott (R)	Richard Petty Motorsports	Ford
46	Michael Annett	HScott Motorsports	Chevrolet
47	A. J. Allmendinger	JTG Daugherty Racing	Chevrolet
48	Jimmie Johnson	Hendrick Motorsports	Chevrolet
55	Reed Sorenson	Premium Motorsports	Chevrolet
78	Martin Truex Jr.	Furniture Row Racing	Toyota
83	Matt DiBenedetto	BK Racing	Toyota
88	Alex Bowman (i)	Hendrick Motorsports	Chevrolet
95	Michael McDowell	Circle Sport – Leavine Family Racing	Chevrolet
98	Cole Whitt	Premium Motorsports	Chevrolet
Official entry list

== Practice ==
=== First practice ===
Kevin Harvick was the fastest in the first practice session with a time of 27.870 and a speed of 193.757 mph (311.822 km/h).

Pos	No.	Driver	Team	Manufacturer	Time	Speed
1	4	Kevin Harvick	Stewart–Haas Racing	Chevrolet	27.870	193.757
2	88	Alex Bowman (i)	Hendrick Motorsports	Chevrolet	27.996	192.885
3	78	Martin Truex Jr.	Furniture Row Racing	Toyota	28.034	192.623
Official first practice results

=== Practice (post-qualifying) ===
Both practice sessions scheduled for Friday following qualifying was cancelled due to rain stemming from Hurricane Matthew.

== Qualifying ==
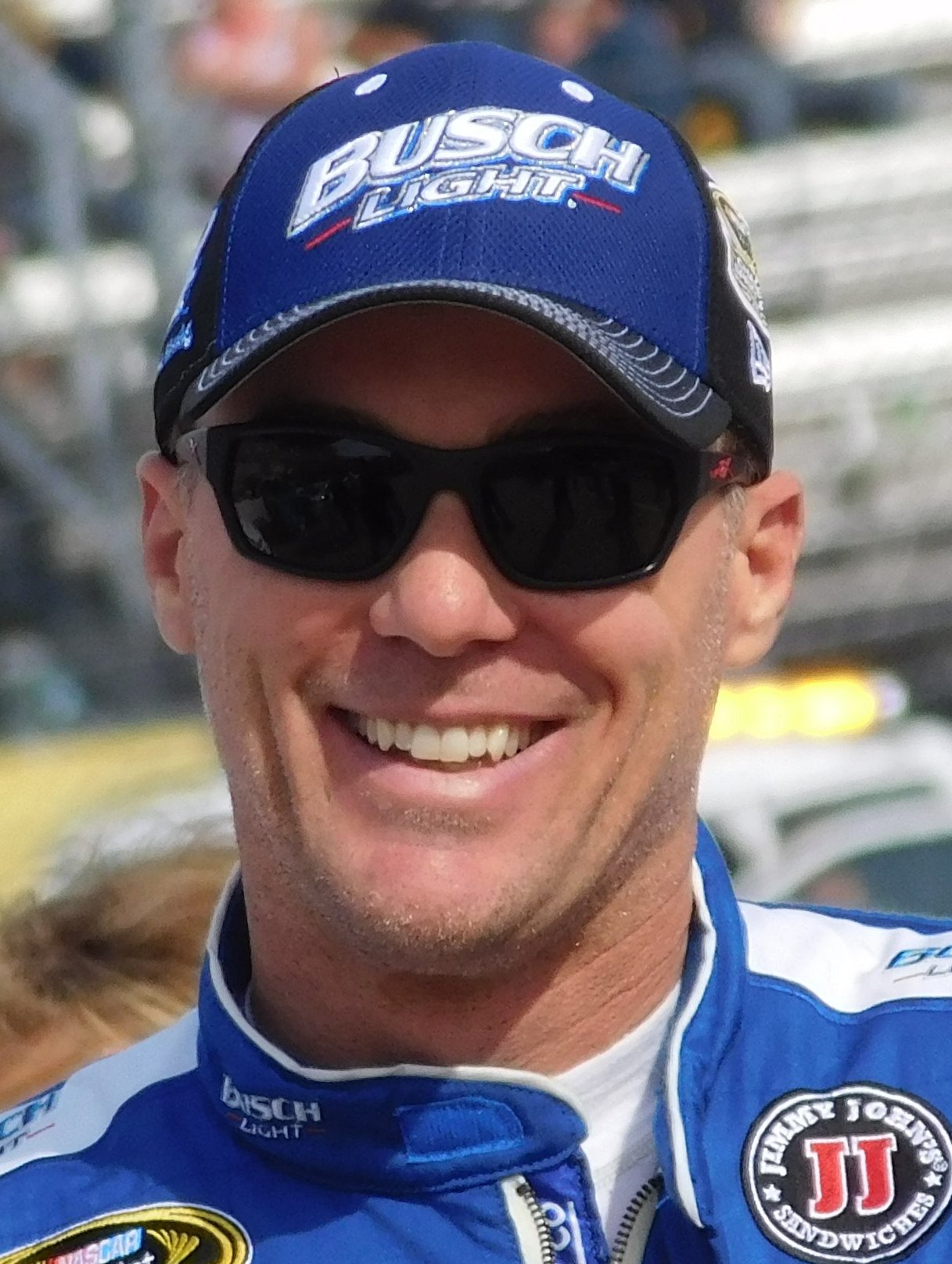
Kevin Harvick scored the pole position.

Kevin Harvick scored the pole for the race with a time of 27.547 and a speed of 196.026 mph (315.473 km/h). He said afterwards that he "just got to the green a little bit better. The car was too loose the time before. And I got to the green better. It was good in (Turns) 1 and 2; but I felt like I gave up a little something in (Turns) 3 and 4 coming to the checkered. But, I’ve just got to thank all my sponsors and everybody on this team, Chevrolet and Hendrick engines and chassis for everything that they do and for everything that Stewart-Haas (Racing) does. This has just been a fun car to drive today. Hopefully we can get it dialed in race trim.”

Alex Bowman, who qualified second, said he "didn't put the greatest lap together. In (Turns) 1 and 2, we were a little free in (into the corner) and didn't really keep it on the bottom like I needed to. Turns 3 and 4 were really good. It means so much for Hendrick Motorsports to take a chance on me for these races. I'm really thankful to be here. I hate that we didn't get the pole. We were so close. It's definitely my best starting spot by a bunch, but you'd always like that pole."

=== Qualifying results ===
Pos	No.	Driver	Team	Manufacturer	R1	R2	R3
1	4	Kevin Harvick	Stewart–Haas Racing	Chevrolet	27.727	27.635	27.547
2	88	Alex Bowman (i)	Hendrick Motorsports	Chevrolet	27.815	27.523	27.551
3	24	Chase Elliott (R)	Hendrick Motorsports	Chevrolet	27.994	27.660	27.585
4	18	Kyle Busch	Joe Gibbs Racing	Toyota	27.934	27.746	27.660
5	14	Tony Stewart	Stewart–Haas Racing	Chevrolet	27.864	27.787	27.660
6	47	A. J. Allmendinger	JTG Daugherty Racing	Chevrolet	27.799	27.734	27.680
7	78	Martin Truex Jr.	Furniture Row Racing	Toyota	27.978	27.703	27.717
8	19	Carl Edwards	Joe Gibbs Racing	Toyota	27.898	27.776	27.756
9	11	Denny Hamlin	Joe Gibbs Racing	Toyota	27.859	27.710	27.811
10	22	Joey Logano	Team Penske	Ford	27.950	27.741	27.828
11	48	Jimmie Johnson	Hendrick Motorsports	Chevrolet	28.097	27.800	28.033
12	5	Kasey Kahne	Hendrick Motorsports	Chevrolet	28.021	27.680	28.640
13	10	Danica Patrick	Stewart–Haas Racing	Chevrolet	28.009	27.812	
14	16	Greg Biffle	Roush Fenway Racing	Ford	28.103	27.834	
15	17	Ricky Stenhouse Jr.	Roush Fenway Racing	Ford	27.858	27.840	
16	1	Jamie McMurray	Chip Ganassi Racing	Chevrolet	28.050	27.854	
17	20	Matt Kenseth	Joe Gibbs Racing	Toyota	27.903	27.865	
18	21	Ryan Blaney (R)	Wood Brothers Racing	Ford	28.049	27.873	
19	3	Austin Dillon	Richard Childress Racing	Chevrolet	27.925	27.875	
20	2	Brad Keselowski	Team Penske	Ford	28.067	27.889	
21	31	Ryan Newman	Richard Childress Racing	Chevrolet	28.033	27.949	
22	95	Michael McDowell	Circle Sport – Leavine Family Racing	Chevrolet	28.084	27.978	
23	41	Kurt Busch	Stewart–Haas Racing	Chevrolet	28.017	28.095	
24	93	Matt DiBenedetto	BK Racing	Toyota	28.068	28.200	
25	42	Kyle Larson	Chip Ganassi Racing	Chevrolet	28.128		
26	34	Chris Buescher (R)	Front Row Motorsports	Ford	28.150		
27	6	Trevor Bayne	Roush Fenway Racing	Ford	28.192		
28	27	Paul Menard	Richard Childress Racing	Chevrolet	28.194		
29	13	Casey Mears	Germain Racing	Chevrolet	28.203		
30	44	Brian Scott (R)	Richard Petty Motorsports	Ford	28.216		
31	15	Clint Bowyer	HScott Motorsports	Chevrolet	28.279		
32	38	Landon Cassill	Front Row Motorsports	Ford	28.329		
33	43	Aric Almirola	Richard Petty Motorsports	Ford	28.337		
34	23	David Ragan	BK Racing	Toyota	28.413		
35	7	Regan Smith	Tommy Baldwin Racing	Chevrolet	28.592		
36	98	Cole Whitt	Premium Motorsports	Chevrolet	29.032		
37	46	Michael Annett	HScott Motorsports	Chevrolet	29.036		
38	32	Jeffrey Earnhardt (R)	Go FAS Racing	Ford	29.183		
39	55	Reed Sorenson	Premium Motorsports	Chevrolet	29.400		
40	30	Josh Wise	The Motorsports Group	Chevrolet	29.453		
Official qualifying results

== Race ==
=== First half ===
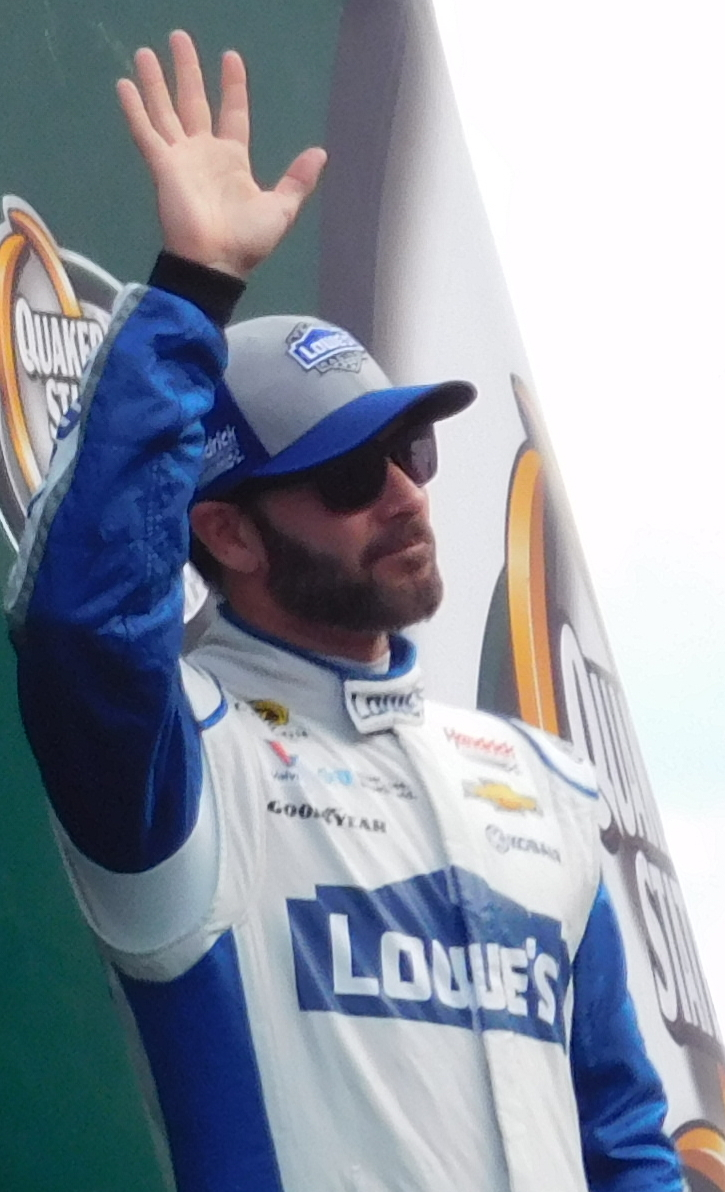
Jimmie Johnson won the race.

Under clear blue North Carolina skies, Kevin Harvick led the field to the green flag at 12:05 p.m. He led the first 12 laps before Chase Elliott got a run on him exiting turn 4 and took the lead on lap 13. The first caution flew on lap 25. It was a scheduled competition caution. Five drivers – Aric Almirola, Jeffrey Earnhardt, Matt Kenseth and Paul Menard for their crews being over the wall too soon, and Michael Annett for speeding – were sent to the tail end of the field for the restart.

The race restarted on lap 31. The second caution flew on lap 62 for a two-car wreck in turn 3 that started when Alex Bowman suffered a right-front tire blowout and slammed the wall, as well as Casey Mears, in turn 3. “Blew a tire I guess,” Bowman said. "It’s really unfortunate. I hate it for these Axalta guys. Everybody at Hendrick Motorsports worked so hard. They brought a great race car here, brand new and destroyed it. Really unfortunate, but it’s not anybody’s fault. We didn’t hit anything we just must have run over something." Mears said he "was going into the corner and I saw him come up all of a sudden. I don’t know. It’s too bad he didn’t put us out of our misery there. We were having a rough start of it. We were just kind of hanging on and actually those guys were going by us. They either blew a right-front (tire) or had something come loose or something and came up into us.” Mears went on to finish 40th. Brad Keselowski was sent to the tail end for his crew being over the wall too soon.

The race restarted on lap 71. Kyle Busch made an unscheduled stop from third on lap 90 for a right-front tire "delamination." Kyle Larson made an unscheduled stop a few laps later for the same issue. Green flag stops began on lap 111. Elliott pitted from the lead on lap 115 and handed it to Joey Logano. The third caution of the race flew on lap 117 after Logano suffered a right-front tire blowout and slammed the wall in turn 1. This handed the lead to Jimmie Johnson. Tony Stewart was sent to the tail end of the field for speeding.

The race restarted on lap 125. Denny Hamlin beat Johnson on the restart to take the lead. Harvick was running third when his engine shut off and began to fade on lap 156. He said in the garage that he "thought it was a power issue. So I cycled through everything. By the time I figured out what happened it just shut off. It looks like low oil pressure. I hate it for everybody ... they made some great adjustments today and got our car back where we needed to be to run up front and everything was going fine." The fourth caution of the race flew on the same lap for Logano suffering another right-front tire blowout and slamming the wall in turn 1 again. When asked what the issue was that caused him to wreck twice, he said he didn't "know. Tires are popping. We’re not the only car that had the issue, but we’re the ones that hit the wall when it happen, so that's not the best place to have them go down. We had a fast car. Our car was capable of winning the race. We drove up from 10th and were up to third and running down the leaders, so I felt really good about what we had. I don't know. Things happen. It's part of racing, I guess.”

=== Second half ===
The race restarted on lap 162. Johnson drove by Hamlin in turn 3 to retake the lead on lap 177. Another round of green flag stops started on lap 213. Johnson pitted from the lead the following lap and handed it to Ryan Newman. He pitted the next lap and handed the lead to Clint Bowyer. He pitted on lap 219 and the lead cycled back to Johnson. Ricky Stenhouse Jr. was given a pass through penalty for speeding.

Debris on the frontstretch brought out the fifth caution of the race on lap 228.

The race restarted with 98 laps to go. The sixth caution flew with 81 laps to go after A. J. Allmendinger suffered a right-front tire blowout and slammed the wall in turn 2.

The race restarted with 76 laps to go and the seventh caution of the race flew for a multi-car wreck on the frontstretch that started when Martin Truex Jr., wanting to push Austin Dillon ahead of race leader Johnson, got him loose, sent his car down the track and slammed hard into the inside barrier just past the exit of pit road. Elliott braked and swerved to the right to avoid Dillon. Unfortunately, Busch swerved to the left at the same time and hooked him into the wall and was rammed by Ryan Blaney and Paul Menard. After being released from the infield care center, Dillon said he was "fine, it just sucks. We will have to work hard the next two weeks to get the points back. I felt like I got to third gear pretty clean and then the next thing – I feel contact and I am spinning through the grass. It’s part of it and we took two tires there and you know the risk when you get into it. You just hope that doesn’t happen obviously. I got to third without spinning the tires, and I felt like we got contacted.” Elliott said he thought "the No. 3 they stayed out on tires and tried to get some track position. The No. 78 ended up getting him out of shape and then after that I tried to check up. I don't think the No. 18 saw it, got into us and got us turned the wrong way. It happens we just got to go and try to have more runs like that next week.” The race was red-flagged for 10 minutes and 48 seconds.

The race restarted with 69 laps to go. The eighth caution of the race flew for Denny Hamlin losing an engine on the fronstretch with 26 laps to go. Kenseth exited pit road with the race lead.

The race restarted with 18 laps to go. Johnson beat Kenseth on the restart to take the lead and drove on to score the victory.

== Post-race ==
=== Driver comments ===
“When you drive for Rick Hendrick and have all the great people at Hendrick Motorsports working for you, there are just so many great people behind us and that support us to make this happen,” Johnson said in victory lane. “We knew we would get back. It was slower than we wanted it to be but to be here today and have this victory is great."

Kenseth said afterwards that his run "was a great second. I think this is one of the toughest tracks there is on the circuit to pass at. It was better during the day than it is at night and that's a good thing, because we had to go to the back twice, so we were able to make up some ground and finish okay.”

== Race results ==
Pos	No.	Driver	Team	Manufacturer	Laps	Points
1	48	Jimmie Johnson	Hendrick Motorsports	Chevrolet	334	45
2	20	Matt Kenseth	Joe Gibbs Racing	Toyota	334	40
3	5	Kasey Kahne	Hendrick Motorsports	Chevrolet	334	38
4	31	Ryan Newman	Richard Childress Racing	Chevrolet	334	38
5	42	Kyle Larson	Chip Ganassi Racing	Chevrolet	334	36
6	18	Kyle Busch	Joe Gibbs Racing	Toyota	334	36
7	2	Brad Keselowski	Team Penske	Ford	334	34
8	41	Kurt Busch	Stewart–Haas Racing	Chevrolet	334	33
9	14	Tony Stewart	Stewart–Haas Racing	Chevrolet	334	32
10	1	Jamie McMurray	Chip Ganassi Racing	Chevrolet	334	31
11	10	Danica Patrick	Stewart–Haas Racing	Chevrolet	334	30
12	19	Carl Edwards	Joe Gibbs Racing	Toyota	334	29
13	78	Martin Truex Jr.	Furniture Row Racing	Toyota	334	28
14	95	Michael McDowell	Circle Sport – Leavine Family Racing	Chevrolet	334	27
15	43	Aric Almirola	Richard Petty Motorsports	Ford	334	26
16	34	Chris Buescher (R)	Front Row Motorsports	Ford	334	25
17	15	Clint Bowyer	HScott Motorsports	Chevrolet	334	25
18	6	Trevor Bayne	Roush Fenway Racing	Ford	334	23
19	38	Landon Cassill	Front Row Motorsports	Ford	334	22
20	17	Ricky Stenhouse Jr.	Roush Fenway Racing	Ford	333	21
21	7	Regan Smith	Tommy Baldwin Racing	Chevrolet	333	20
22	44	Brian Scott (R)	Richard Petty Motorsports	Ford	333	19
23	23	David Ragan	BK Racing	Toyota	331	18
24	46	Michael Annett	HScott Motorsports	Chevrolet	330	17
25	83	Matt DiBenedetto	BK Racing	Toyota	329	16
26	32	Jeffrey Earnhardt (R)	Go FAS Racing	Ford	328	15
27	98	Cole Whitt	Premium Motorsports	Chevrolet	327	14
28	55	Reed Sorenson	Premium Motorsports	Chevrolet	321	13
29	30	Josh Wise	The Motorsports Group	Chevrolet	320	12
30	11	Denny Hamlin	Joe Gibbs Racing	Toyota	308	12
31	21	Ryan Blaney (R)	Wood Brothers Racing	Ford	307	10
32	3	Austin Dillon	Richard Childress Racing	Chevrolet	258	9
33	24	Chase Elliott (R)	Hendrick Motorsports	Chevrolet	258	9
34	27	Paul Menard	Richard Childress Racing	Chevrolet	258	7
35	16	Greg Biffle	Roush Fenway Racing	Ford	257	6
36	22	Joey Logano	Team Penske	Ford	254	6
37	47	A. J. Allmendinger	JTG Daugherty Racing	Chevrolet	252	4
38	4	Kevin Harvick	Stewart–Haas Racing	Chevrolet	155	4
39	88	Alex Bowman (i)	Hendrick Motorsports	Chevrolet	61	0
40	13	Casey Mears	Germain Racing	Chevrolet	61	1
Official race results

=== Race summary ===
- Lead changes: 9 among different drivers
- Cautions/Laps: 8 for 51
- Red flags: 1 for 10 minutes and 49 seconds
- Time of race: 3 hours, 42 minutes and 47 seconds
- Average speed: 134.929 miles per hour (217.147 km/h)

== Media ==
=== Television ===
NBC covered the race on the television side. Rick Allen, Jeff Burton and Steve Letarte had the call in the booth for the race. Dave Burns, Mike Massaro, Marty Snider and Kelli Stavast will handle pit road on the television side.

NBC
Booth announcers	Pit reporters
Lap-by-lap: Rick Allen; Color-commentator: Jeff Burton; Color-commentator: Steve Letarte	Dave Burns; Mike Massaro; Marty Snider; Kelli Stavast

=== Radio ===
The Performance Racing Network had the radio call for the race, which was simulcast on Sirius XM NASCAR Radio.

PRN
Booth announcers	Turn announcers	Pit reporters
Lead announcer: Doug Rice; Announcer: Mark Garrow; Announcer: Wendy Venturini	Turns 1 & 2: Rob Albright; Turns 3 & 4: Pat Patterson	Brad Gillie; Brett McMillan; Jim Noble; Steve Richards

== Standings after the race ==
Drivers' Championship standings

	Pos	Driver	Points
10	1	Jimmie Johnson	3,045
2	2	Matt Kenseth	3,040 (–5)
	3	Kyle Busch	3,036 (–9)
3	4	Brad Keselowski	3,034 (–11)
3	5	Kurt Busch	3,033 (–12)
4	6	Carl Edwards	3,029 (–16)
6	7	Martin Truex Jr.	3,028 (–17)
1	8	Denny Hamlin	3,012 (–33)
3	9	Austin Dillon	3,009 (–36)
4	10	Chase Elliott	3,009 (–36)
6	11	Joey Logano	3,006 (–39)
10	12	Kevin Harvick	3,004 (–41)
1	13	Kyle Larson	2,109 (–936)
1	14	Tony Stewart	2,106 (–939)
	15	Jamie McMurray	2,084 (–961)
	16	Chris Buescher	2,070 (–975)
Official driver's standings

Manufacturers' Championship standings

Pos	Manufacturer	Points
1	Toyota	1,241
2	Chevrolet	1,211 (–30)
3	Ford	1,144 (–97)
Official manufacturers' standings

- Note: Only the first 16 positions are included for the driver standings.

Previous race: 2016 Citizen Soldier 400	Sprint Cup Series; 2016 season	Next race: 2016 Hollywood Casino 400
