= 2015 Ford EcoBoost 400 =

Race details
- Race 36 of 36 in the 2015 NASCAR Sprint Cup Series
- Date: November 22, 2015
- Location: Homestead-Miami Speedway in Homestead, Florida
- Course: Permanent racing facility
- Course length: 1.5 miles (2.4 km)
- Distance: 267 laps, 400.5 mi (640.8 km)
- Weather: Mostly sunny skies with a temperature of 81 °F (27 °C); wind out of the west/southwest at 13 mph (21 km/h)
- Average speed: 131.755 mph (212.039 km/h)

Pole position
Driver	Denny Hamlin	Joe Gibbs Racing
- Time: 30.568

Most laps led
Driver	Brad Keselowski	Team Penske
- Laps: 86

Winner
No. 18	Kyle Busch	Joe Gibbs Racing

Television in the United States
- Network: NBC
- Announcers: Rick Allen, Jeff Burton and Steve Letarte
- Nielsen ratings: 4.4/10 (Overnight); 4.4/10 (Final); 7.6 Million viewers

Radio in the United States
- Radio: MRN
- Booth announcers: Joe Moore, Jeff Striegle and Rusty Wallace
- Turn announcers: Dave Moody (1 & 2) and Mike Bagley (3 & 4)

The 2015 Ford EcoBoost 400 was a NASCAR Sprint Cup Series race held on November 22, 2015, at Homestead–Miami Speedway in Homestead, Florida. Contested over 267 laps on the 1.5 mile (2.4 km) oval, it was the 36th and final race of the 2015 NASCAR Sprint Cup Series season. Kyle Busch won the race and the championship, his fifth of the season and first of his career. Kevin Harvick finished second. Brad Keselowski, Joey Logano and Kyle Larson rounded out the top-five. Jeff Gordon finished sixth in his 797th and final scheduled career start and Martin Truex Jr. rounded out the Chase drivers in 14th.

Denny Hamlin won the pole for the race and led zero laps on his way to a 10th-place finish. Keselowski led a race high of 86 laps on his way to a third-place finish. The race had 18 lead changes among eight different drivers, as well as seven caution flag periods for 30 laps.

This was the 34th victory for Busch, fifth of the season, first at Homestead–Miami Speedway and sixth at the track for Joe Gibbs Racing. It clinched his first career Sprint Cup Series championship. Despite being the winning manufacturer, Toyota finished the season 68-points back of Chevrolet who had clinched the manufacturers championship the week prior at Phoenix.

With the introduction of NASCAR's team charter program in 2016, this race marks the final race with a 43-car field.

The Ford EcoBoost 400 was carried by NBC Sports on the broadcast NBC network for the American television audience. The radio broadcast for the race was carried by the Motor Racing Network and Sirius XM NASCAR Radio.

This was the final race for Michael Waltrip Racing.

== Report ==
=== Background ===
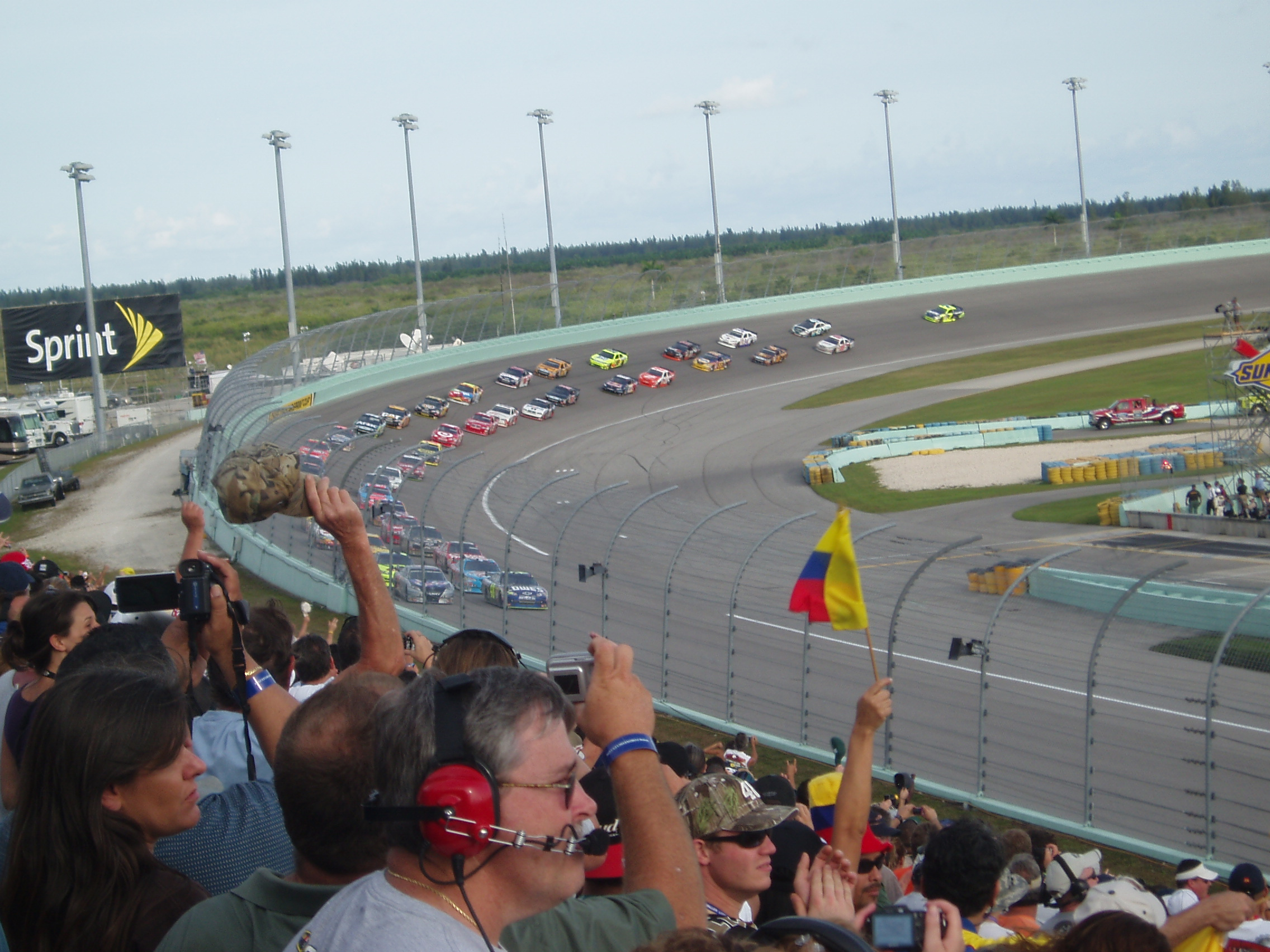
Homestead–Miami Speedway, the track where the race was held

Homestead–Miami Speedway is a 1.500 mi (2.414 km) oval-shaped intermediate speedway in Homestead, Florida.

==== Championship drivers ====
Jeff Gordon was the first of the four drivers to clinch a spot in the championship four, winning the first race of the Eliminator Round at Martinsville. Gordon, running in his final full-time season of Sprint Cup Series racing, seeks his fifth Sprint Cup championship and first since 2001. Entering his 797th Sprint Cup race, he had six consecutive top-10 finishes, including a sixth-place at Phoenix; altogether, he had recorded 20 top-10s in 2015, along with four poles, which include three at the schedule's four restrictor plate races. Gordon struggled during the early portion of the season, being involved in crashes in the first two races and was as low as 35th in points. However, he managed to gain positions in the standings with eight consecutive top-10s after the Kobalt 400. During the remainder of the regular season, he was between ninth and 13th-place in the points. In the first six Chase races, he finished in the top-10 in all but two races (at Chicagoland and Dover). At Martinsville, he clinched a spot in the final four by taking advantage of Team Penske drivers Joey Logano and Brad Keselowski's accidents to claim his 93rd career victory.

Kevin Harvick, the defending Cup champion, finished second behind Dale Earnhardt Jr. at Phoenix to clinch his place in the championship race. Harvick, who had won the 2014 Ford EcoBoost 400, had dominated the regular season, leading the points for 23 straight races (from Las Vegas to Darlington), while also winning at Vegas and Phoenix. However, Harvick struggled in the first two races of the Chase, crashing at Chicago and running out of fuel while leading at Loudon. Being required to win to advance to the Contender Round, he capitalized on Jimmie Johnson's mechanical failure to win at Dover. At Talladega, Harvick – once again faced with the possibility of being eliminated from the Chase and a struggling car – was involved in a controversial restart crash on the green–white–checker finish when he collided with Trevor Bayne and caused a crash with intentions of defending his Chase spot.

Kyle Busch finished fourth at Phoenix to clinch his spot in the championship race. He did not start the first 11 races of the season due to breaking his right leg and left foot when he crashed in the Xfinity Series race at Daytona International Speedway. He returned to racing at the All-Star Race, with his first points race return being an 11th-place finish in the Coca-Cola 600 at Charlotte Motor Speedway. For Busch to qualify for the Chase, he had to record at least one win and make the top 30. The next three races were marred by crashes in two, but scored his first win of the season in the Toyota/Save Mart 350. He then proceeded to win three consecutive races, making him the first driver since the 2007 season to accomplish the feat. The following week, he won his first pole of the year at Pocono. The week after, he entered the top-30 in points. In the first nine Chase races, Busch finished in the top-20 in all but one race (Loudon).

Martin Truex Jr. was the last driver to click his spot in the championship race after the Phoenix race was stopped, beating Carl Edwards by five-points with his 14th-place finish. Truex, considered as the underdog of the championship four, had a strong regular season under new crew chief Cole Pearn. He recorded top-10 finishes in the first seven races. From Kansas to Dover, Truex led a combined 239 laps, but failed to win. The following race at Pocono, Truex was able to claim his first victory of the season, third of his career and first since the 2013 Toyota/Save Mart 350 at Sonoma Raceway. Despite being as high as second in points, Truex's finishes during the remainder of the regular season dropped him down to ninth. During the Chase, he finished in the top-20 in every race, with a best finish of third at Charlotte.

==== Drivers making final start with team ====
A number of drivers made their final start with their respective 2015 team.

While nothing was officially announced, Richard Petty Motorsports team owner Richard Petty said that he didn't expect Sam Hornish Jr. to return to the No. 9 Ford in 2016. He said that the team has "to look at sponsorship as much as anything else. It's a combination deal. We can't just go with the driver and then not have the money. We can't go with the money and not have a driver."

On August 22, 2015, Michael Waltrip Racing announced that the team would terminate operations at the end of the 2015 season. On September 28, 2015, HScott Motorsports announced that Clint Bowyer would drive the No. 51 car in 2016. This displaced Justin Allgaier who returned to the Xfinity Series in 2016 to drive for JR Motorsports.

David Ragan – who drove for Front Row Motorsports, Joe Gibbs Racing and MWR in the 2015 season – was without a ride going into the offseason. He said that a few "teams have reached out to me. I've reached out to a few teams. Ultimately I don't have anything in the works or coming together right now. I'm trying to be as patient as I can just to see what happens. A lot of times things change that are unexpected with some of these top teams in the last months of the season. We've had guys get fired after Homestead before. Drivers have issues, different things happen, so I'm patiently waiting for the right opportunity." Eventually, he would be with BK Racing for 2016, in the #23 J.J. Yeley (later Jeb Burton) were in.

==== Entry list ====
The entry list for the Ford EcoBoost 400 was released on Monday, November 16 at 12:15 p.m. Eastern time. Forty-five drivers were entered for the race. All but Ryan Blaney and Michael McDowell were entered in the previous week's race at Phoenix. After serving a two-race suspension, Matt Kenseth returned to the seat of the No. 20 Joe Gibbs Racing Toyota. Josh Wise drove the No. 32 Go FAS Racing Ford. Ty Dillon returned to the seat of the No. 33 Hillman-Circle Sport LLC Chevrolet. Reed Sorenson drove the No. 62 Premium Motorsports Ford.

No.	Driver	Team	Manufacturer
1	Jamie McMurray	Chip Ganassi Racing	Chevrolet
2	Brad Keselowski (PC3)	Team Penske	Ford
3	Austin Dillon	Richard Childress Racing	Chevrolet
4	Kevin Harvick (PC1) (CC)	Stewart–Haas Racing	Chevrolet
5	Kasey Kahne	Hendrick Motorsports	Chevrolet
6	Trevor Bayne	Roush Fenway Racing	Ford
7	Alex Bowman	Tommy Baldwin Racing	Chevrolet
9	Sam Hornish Jr.	Richard Petty Motorsports	Ford
10	Danica Patrick	Stewart–Haas Racing	Chevrolet
11	Denny Hamlin	Joe Gibbs Racing	Toyota
13	Casey Mears	Germain Racing	Chevrolet
14	Tony Stewart (PC4)	Stewart–Haas Racing	Chevrolet
15	Clint Bowyer	Michael Waltrip Racing	Toyota
16	Greg Biffle	Roush Fenway Racing	Ford
17	Ricky Stenhouse Jr.	Roush Fenway Racing	Ford
18	Kyle Busch (CC)	Joe Gibbs Racing	Toyota
19	Carl Edwards	Joe Gibbs Racing	Toyota
20	Matt Kenseth (PC6)	Joe Gibbs Racing	Toyota
21	Ryan Blaney (i)	Wood Brothers Racing	Ford
22	Joey Logano	Team Penske	Ford
23	Jeb Burton (R)	BK Racing	Toyota
24	Jeff Gordon (PC7) (CC)	Hendrick Motorsports	Chevrolet
26	J. J. Yeley (i)	BK Racing	Toyota
27	Paul Menard	Richard Childress Racing	Chevrolet
31	Ryan Newman	Richard Childress Racing	Chevrolet
32	Josh Wise	Go FAS Racing	Ford
33	Ty Dillon (i)	Hillman-Circle Sport LLC	Chevrolet
34	Brett Moffitt (R)	Front Row Motorsports	Ford
35	Cole Whitt	Front Row Motorsports	Ford
38	David Gilliland	Front Row Motorsports	Ford
40	Landon Cassill (i)	Hillman-Circle Sport LLC	Chevrolet
41	Kurt Busch (PC5)	Stewart–Haas Racing	Chevrolet
42	Kyle Larson	Chip Ganassi Racing	Chevrolet
43	Aric Almirola	Richard Petty Motorsports	Ford
46	Michael Annett	HScott Motorsports	Chevrolet
47	A. J. Allmendinger	JTG Daugherty Racing	Chevrolet
48	Jimmie Johnson (PC2)	Hendrick Motorsports	Chevrolet
51	Justin Allgaier	HScott Motorsports	Chevrolet
55	David Ragan	Michael Waltrip Racing	Toyota
62	Reed Sorenson	Premium Motorsports	Chevrolet
78	Martin Truex Jr. (CC)	Furniture Row Racing	Chevrolet
83	Matt DiBenedetto (R)	BK Racing	Toyota
88	Dale Earnhardt Jr.	Hendrick Motorsports	Chevrolet
95	Michael McDowell	Leavine Family Racing	Ford
98	Ryan Preece	Premium Motorsports	Ford
Official initial entry list
Official updated entry list

Key	Meaning
(R)	Rookie
(i)	Ineligible for points
(PC#)	Past champions provisional
(CC)	Championship Contender

== Practice ==
=== First practice ===
Carl Edwards was the fastest in the first practice session with a time of 30.832 and a speed of 175.143 mph (281.865 km/h). The session was red-flagged 39 minutes in when Ryan Preece went up in smoke and started leaking power steering fluid.

Pos	No.	Driver	Team	Manufacturer	Time	Speed
1	19	Carl Edwards	Joe Gibbs Racing	Toyota	30.832	175.143
2	2	Brad Keselowski	Team Penske	Ford	30.954	174.452
3	78	Martin Truex Jr.	Furniture Row Racing	Chevrolet	30.968	174.374
Official first practice results

=== Second practice ===
Kyle Larson was the fastest in the second practice session with a time of 30.680 and a speed of 176.010 mph (283.261 km/h).

Pos	No.	Driver	Team	Manufacturer	Time	Speed
1	42	Kyle Larson	Chip Ganassi Racing	Chevrolet	30.680	176.010
2	4	Kevin Harvick	Stewart–Haas Racing	Chevrolet	30.823	175.194
3	19	Carl Edwards	Joe Gibbs Racing	Toyota	30.968	174.374
Official second practice results

=== Final practice ===
Joey Logano was the fastest in the final practice session with a time of 30.786 and a speed of 175.404 mph (282.285 km/h).

Pos	No.	Driver	Team	Manufacturer	Time	Speed
1	22	Joey Logano	Team Penske	Ford	30.786	175.404
2	5	Kasey Kahne	Hendrick Motorsports	Chevrolet	30.843	175.080
3	88	Dale Earnhardt Jr.	Hendrick Motorsports	Chevrolet	30.851	175.035
Official final practice results

== Qualifying ==
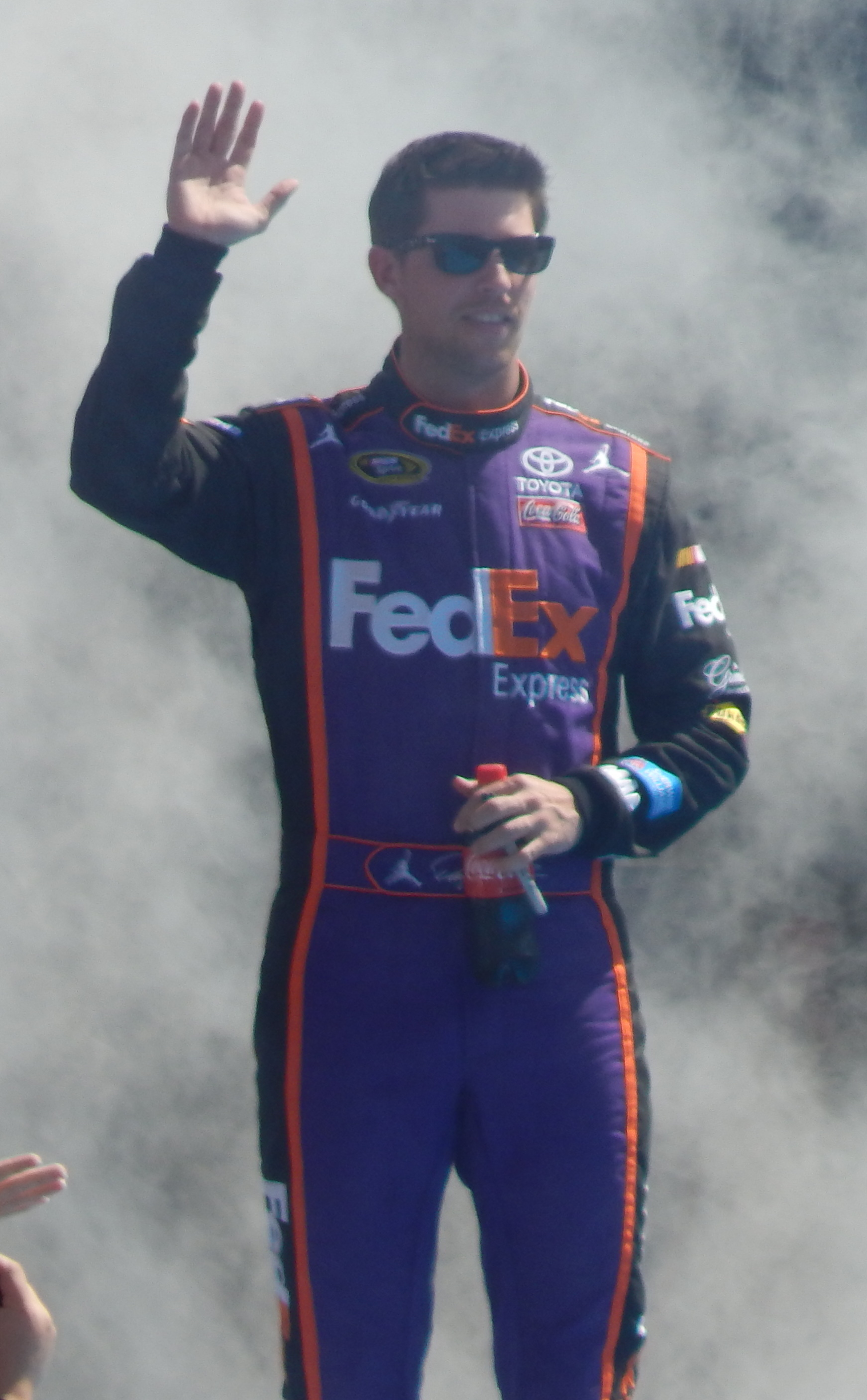
Denny Hamlin scored the pole for the race.

Denny Hamlin won the pole for the race with a time of 30.568 and a speed of 176.655 mph (284.299 km/h). He said afterwards that he wished his team "were a part of it (championship four)...unfortunately[,] a couple mechanical things took us out of this Chase, but we're going to hopefully go out with a bang." Joey Logano, who qualified second, said that he wasn't "quite fast enough. It felt like after practice we didn't get a qualifying run before the rain and it was an unknown to us. My team did a good job with the changeover to qualifying trim though and I am proud of what my team was able to do there, just wish we were a little faster in that third round.” Kyle Busch, who qualified third, said that where you qualify at Homestead "doesn't matter much. Nothing to hang our heads about right now.” Jeff Gordon, who qualified fifth for his 797th and final career start, said he's "having a blast. It's a win-win no matter what happens. When it goes the way it went in qualifying...man that's fun. How could I not be having the time of my life? We have a very strong race car in this Axalta Chevrolet, obviously, because to be able to do that the next couple of runs; I'm pretty proud of those laps. I had to make up to this team what I did on the first run, so I was glad I was able to make it up. It's pretty awesome to get top five. I'm really happy and proud of that.”

=== Qualifying results ===
Pos	No.	Driver	Team	Manufacturer	R1	R2	R3
1	11	Denny Hamlin	Joe Gibbs Racing	Toyota	30.665	30.689	30.568
2	22	Joey Logano	Team Penske	Ford	30.520	30.519	30.636
3	18	Kyle Busch (CC)	Joe Gibbs Racing	Toyota	30.691	30.587	30.671
4	31	Ryan Newman	Richard Childress Racing	Chevrolet	30.590	30.748	30.796
5	24	Jeff Gordon (CC)	Hendrick Motorsports	Chevrolet	30.758	30.705	30.806
6	21	Ryan Blaney (i)	Wood Brothers Racing	Ford	30.681	30.756	30.832
7	19	Carl Edwards	Joe Gibbs Racing	Toyota	30.525	30.777	30.846
8	2	Brad Keselowski	Team Penske	Ford	30.571	30.666	30.849
9	88	Dale Earnhardt Jr.	Hendrick Motorsports	Chevrolet	30.587	30.771	30.914
10	3	Austin Dillon	Richard Childress Racing	Chevrolet	30.621	30.752	30.922
11	78	Martin Truex Jr. (CC)	Furniture Row Racing	Chevrolet	30.645	30.776	30.946
12	48	Jimmie Johnson	Hendrick Motorsports	Chevrolet	30.856	30.703	31.017
13	4	Kevin Harvick (CC)	Stewart–Haas Racing	Chevrolet	30.363	30.779	—
14	43	Aric Almirola	Richard Petty Motorsports	Ford	30.677	30.786	—
15	41	Kurt Busch	Stewart–Haas Racing	Chevrolet	30.492	30.793	—
16	17	Ricky Stenhouse Jr.	Roush Fenway Racing	Ford	30.734	30.808	—
17	27	Paul Menard	Richard Childress Racing	Chevrolet	30.597	30.815	—
18	5	Kasey Kahne	Hendrick Motorsports	Chevrolet	30.826	30.815	—
19	20	Matt Kenseth	Joe Gibbs Racing	Toyota	30.636	30.820	—
20	47	A. J. Allmendinger	JTG Daugherty Racing	Chevrolet	30.798	30.882	—
21	16	Greg Biffle	Roush Fenway Racing	Ford	30.867	30.960	—
22	1	Jamie McMurray	Chip Ganassi Racing	Chevrolet	30.741	30.974	—
23	42	Kyle Larson	Chip Ganassi Racing	Chevrolet	30.817	31.024	—
24	15	Clint Bowyer	Michael Waltrip Racing	Toyota	30.878	31.277	—
25	33	Ty Dillon (i)	Hillman-Circle Sport LLC	Chevrolet	30.884	—	—
26	6	Trevor Bayne	Roush Fenway Racing	Ford	31.014	—	—
27	13	Casey Mears	Germain Racing	Chevrolet	31.065	—	—
28	9	Sam Hornish Jr.	Richard Petty Motorsports	Ford	31.084	—	—
29	95	Michael McDowell	Leavine Family Racing	Ford	31.097	—	—
30	51	Justin Allgaier	HScott Motorsports	Chevrolet	31.142	—	—
31	26	J. J. Yeley (i)	BK Racing	Toyota	31.178	—	—
32	32	Josh Wise	Go FAS Racing	Ford	31.244	—	—
33	7	Alex Bowman	Tommy Baldwin Racing	Chevrolet	31.259	—	—
34	40	Landon Cassill (i)	Hillman-Circle Sport LLC	Chevrolet	31.283	—	—
35	10	Danica Patrick	Stewart–Haas Racing	Chevrolet	31.311	—	—
36	14	Tony Stewart	Stewart–Haas Racing	Chevrolet	31.345	—	—
37	83	Matt DiBenedetto (R)	BK Racing	Toyota	31.361	—	—
38	55	David Ragan	Michael Waltrip Racing	Toyota	31.411	—	—
39	46	Michael Annett	HScott Motorsports	Chevrolet	31.469	—	—
40	35	Cole Whitt	Front Row Motorsports	Ford	31.499	—	—
41	38	David Gilliland (Note: David Gilliland started from the rear of the field after a transmission change.)	Front Row Motorsports	Ford	31.549	—	—
42	34	Brett Moffitt (R)	Front Row Motorsports	Ford	31.581	—	—
43	98	Ryan Preece	Premium Motorsports	Ford	31.771	—	—
Failed to qualify
44	23	Jeb Burton (R)	BK Racing	Toyota	31.749	—	—
45	62	Reed Sorenson	Premium Motorsports	Chevrolet	31.850	—	—
Official qualifying results

== Race ==
=== First half ===
==== Start ====
The race was scheduled to start at 3:15 p.m., but was delayed by rain. The track was dried and under mostly sunny Florida skies, Denny Hamlin led the field to the green flag at 5:15 p.m.. It would be Joey Logano, however, who would lead the first lap. Hamlin followed closely to not lose ground on him. Fluid in turn 1 brought out the first caution of the race on lap 13. The fluid came from the No. 11 Toyota. Logano opted not to pit while most of the field came down pit road.

The race restarted on lap 19. Kyle Busch on four new tires had no trouble passing Logano for the lead on lap 21. The second caution of the race flew on lap 31. It was a scheduled competition caution for overnight and pre-race rain showers.

The race restarted on lap 36. Jeff Gordon drove underneath Busch and Carl Edwards to take the lead the next lap. The third caution of the race flew on lap 40 for a single-car wreck in turn 1. Kasey Kahne suffered a right-rear tire blowout and hit the wall.

The race restarted on lap 45. Kevin Harvick drove by Gordon exiting turn 2 to take the lead the next lap. The fourth caution of the race flew on lap 47 for a multi-car wreck on the backstretch. Exiting turn 2, Clint Bowyer bounced off Ty Dillon overcorrected, turned up the track, clipped Dale Earnhardt Jr. and sent him into the inside wall. Aric Almirola slammed into the rear of Bowyer. Casey Mears got clipped by Earnhardt and hit the inside wall. David Ragan hit Earnhardt and damaged his car. After being released from the infield care center, Bowyer said that exiting "two, my car got loose, and I couldn't catch it. We lost the handling on the car big-time. I hate for it to end this way. I wanted to end on a strong note for MWR. I appreciate everybody's hard work over the years, but unfortunately it's over." He would go on to finish 43rd. Jimmie Johnson was running fourth when race control called him onto pit road to fix the right-side of the car after the jackman inadvertently pushed in the right-rear side skirt when he was making a wedge adjustment to the car. He was also forced to serve a drive-through penalty when the race went back to green.

==== Second quarter ====
The race restarted on lap 54. Martin Truex Jr. kicked off a round of green flag stops on lap 89. Harvick pitted from the lead on lap 91 and handed it to Kyle Larson. He pitted the next lap and the lead cycled to Logano.

Truex started the next round of green flag stops when he pitted on lap 138. During his stop, a fire started in his pit stall that forced his gas man to cease fueling the car before it was completed. Logano stopped from the lead on lap 139 and handed it to Kyle Busch. He pitted the next lap and the lead cycled to Edwards.

=== Second half ===
==== Halfway ====
Debris on the backstretch brought out the fifth caution of the race on lap 148. The debris came from the back of the No. 88 Chevrolet of Earnhardt Jr. Kyle Busch exited pit road with the race lead.

The race restarted on lap 155. The sixth caution of the race flew on lap 167 for a single-car wreck in turn 1. Josh Wise suffered a right-front tire blowout and slammed the wall. Truex exited pit road with the race lead after taking just right-side tires.

The race restarted with 96 laps to go. Brad Keselowski passed Truex with ease on the backstretch and took the lead with 95 to go. Truex started the final round of green flag stops with 54 laps to go. Keselowski pitted with 53 laps to go and handed the lead to Kyle Busch. He pitted the next lap and the lead cycled back to Keselowski.

==== Fourth quarter ====
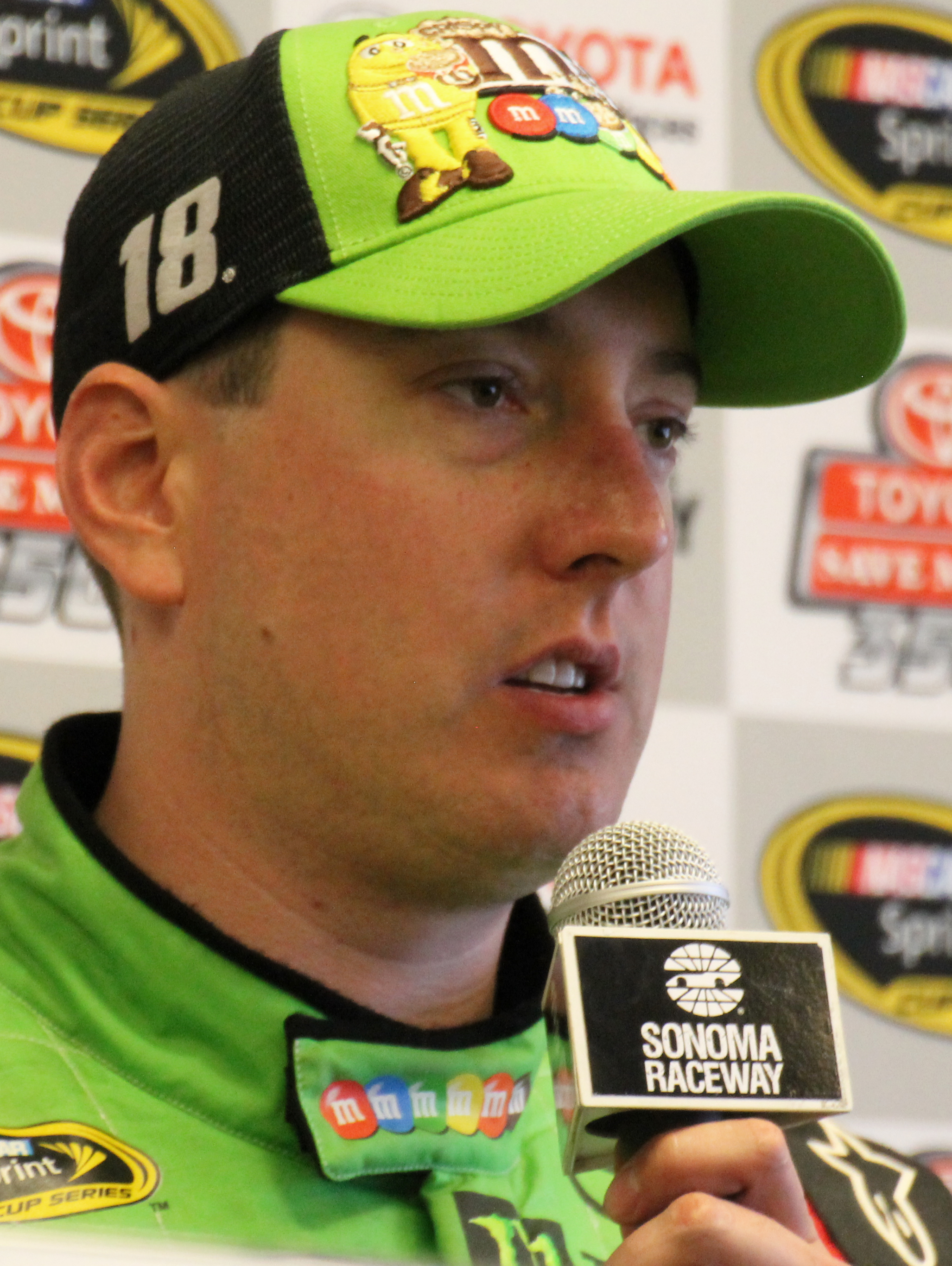
Kyle Busch, seen here at Sonoma, scored his 34th career victory and his first championship

After the final stop, Kyle Busch continued to run in second until he was passed by Larson with 14 laps to go. Harvick continued to run in fourth. Gordon ran in 10th and Truex ran between 12th and 14th in the running order. After passing Busch for second, Larson began to reel in race leader Keselowski. Debris on the front stretch brought out the seventh caution of the race with 12 laps to go. It was for a piece of metal lying under the flag stand while NBC mistakenly showed what appeared to be a plastic bottle on the apron as the debris that brought out the caution. Keselowski's crew chief Paul Wolfe told FoxSports.com after the race that he was "trying to understand what it was for. I didn't ever really see what it was for, but I guess that's just the way it goes. I figured we obviously had a nice lead there and should have been able to cruise into Victory Lane, but I guess it just wasn't meant to be."

The race restarted with seven laps to go. Kyle Busch powered by Keselowski exiting turn 2 to take the lead with six to go. He would go on to win the race and earn his first ever NASCAR Sprint Cup Series championship.

== Post-race ==
=== Driver comments ===
Busch said afterwards that winning the title was "pretty unbelievable. It's a dream of a lifetime, a dream come true, it's something that happens only every so often. I just can't believe with everything that happened this year, all the turmoil that I went through, my wife went through, my family went through and people around me went through. This championship is for these guys, my wife, my family and everyone who sacrificed to get me here.”

Harvick's 13th runner-up finish in 2015 broke a tie with Bobby Allison for most second-place finishes in a single season. He joked after the race that second was "the theme of our season." He also added that he was "just really proud of everybody on our team. We were definitely a little bit off tonight, and we just kept throwing stuff at it, and we never really found anything that really helped the car that was like, oh, man, that's what we needed right there. I thought there at the end that the restart, we might do a little better than that, but obviously either the splitter was on the ground or the car was just tighter than it probably needed to be, and just I couldn't hustle it and got it tight and got it up the racetrack and got behind.”

Following a third-place finish, Keselowski said that he "led a lot of laps. The last four races, we have run pretty strong, maybe not as strong at Phoenix as we wanted, but three of the four races, we were really strong, and we just didn't have enough to close it at the end. I was really proud of my team tonight, really happy with what they were able to give me, and we were able to take a run at it, we just didn't quite have enough at the end on that final restart to hold those guys off."

Following a fourth-place finish, Logano said that he "didn't win and that's what we wanted to do. We had a few good runs and made an adjustment that just took it out of the track and by the time we got it back we lost too much track position. We had a bad pit stop under green and lost more there, so it was too little, too late. We couldn't redeem ourselves after a couple mistakes.”

After a fifth-place finish, Larson said that he "didn't need that last caution. It probably cost me or Brad (Keselowski) a win, but it did make it somewhat exciting at the end. Disappointed that we didn't get the win because I really thought we were about two to three laps away from passing Brad for the lead. We will just go back next season and try and fight for some more wins."

A sixth-place finish wasn't enough to deliver Gordon a fifth Sprint Cup Series championship. He said afterwards that he was "a little disappointed," but all in all, a good way to go out. It doesn't mean I had to win a championship or even compete for a championship, but I wanted to win a race, at least. I wanted to show that I still had what it takes, and I think the Chase showed that. I'm extremely proud of my driving and our effort these last 10 races. That's something that's going to stick with me for a long time - in how I made the announcement and how we approached this season and how we finished it."

Following a 12th-place finish, Truex said that it was "a little disappointing where we ended up. We definitely didn't come in here saying we'd be OK with fourth. We tried our best, but it just wasn't in the cards for us tonight. It's frustrating to have a day like this because everything was on the line.”

== Race results ==
Pos	No.	Driver	Team	Manufacturer	Laps	Points
1	18	Kyle Busch	Joe Gibbs Racing	Toyota	267	43
2	4	Kevin Harvick	Stewart–Haas Racing	Chevrolet	267	42
3	2	Brad Keselowski	Team Penske	Ford	267	43
4	22	Joey Logano	Team Penske	Ford	267	41
5	42	Kyle Larson	Chip Ganassi Racing	Chevrolet	267	40
6	24	Jeff Gordon	Hendrick Motorsports	Chevrolet	267	38
7	20	Matt Kenseth	Joe Gibbs Racing	Toyota	267	37
8	41	Kurt Busch	Stewart–Haas Racing	Chevrolet	267	36
9	48	Jimmie Johnson	Hendrick Motorsports	Chevrolet	267	35
10	11	Denny Hamlin	Joe Gibbs Racing	Toyota	267	34
11	19	Carl Edwards	Joe Gibbs Racing	Toyota	267	34
12	78	Martin Truex Jr.	Furniture Row Racing	Chevrolet	267	32
13	1	Jamie McMurray	Chip Ganassi Racing	Chevrolet	267	31
14	3	Austin Dillon	Richard Childress Racing	Chevrolet	267	30
15	16	Greg Biffle	Roush Fenway Racing	Ford	267	29
16	31	Ryan Newman	Richard Childress Racing	Chevrolet	267	28
17	21	Ryan Blaney (i)	Wood Brothers Racing	Ford	267	0
18	6	Trevor Bayne	Roush Fenway Racing	Ford	267	26
19	5	Kasey Kahne	Hendrick Motorsports	Chevrolet	267	25
20	47	A. J. Allmendinger	JTG Daugherty Racing	Chevrolet	266	24
21	27	Paul Menard	Richard Childress Racing	Chevrolet	266	23
22	17	Ricky Stenhouse Jr.	Roush Fenway Racing	Ford	266	22
23	33	Ty Dillon (i)	Hillman-Circle Sport LLC	Chevrolet	266	0
24	10	Danica Patrick	Stewart–Haas Racing	Chevrolet	266	20
25	9	Sam Hornish Jr.	Richard Petty Motorsports	Ford	266	19
26	7	Alex Bowman	Tommy Baldwin Racing	Chevrolet	265	18
27	55	David Ragan	Michael Waltrip Racing	Toyota	265	17
28	35	Cole Whitt	Front Row Motorsports	Ford	265	16
29	14	Tony Stewart	Stewart–Haas Racing	Chevrolet	265	15
30	46	Michael Annett	HScott Motorsports	Chevrolet	264	14
31	34	Brett Moffitt (R)	Front Row Motorsports	Ford	264	13
32	38	David Gilliland	Front Row Motorsports	Ford	264	12
33	95	Michael McDowell	Leavine Family Racing	Ford	264	11
34	26	J. J. Yeley (i)	BK Racing	Toyota	264	0
35	40	Landon Cassill (i)	Hillman-Circle Sport LLC	Chevrolet	263	0
36	51	Justin Allgaier	HScott Motorsports	Chevrolet	263	8
37	83	Matt DiBenedetto (R)	BK Racing	Toyota	263	7
38	98	Ryan Preece	Premium Motorsports	Ford	262	6
39	32	Josh Wise	Go FAS Racing	Ford	247	5
40	88	Dale Earnhardt Jr.	Hendrick Motorsports	Chevrolet	241	4
41	43	Aric Almirola	Richard Petty Motorsports	Ford	209	3
42	13	Casey Mears	Germain Racing	Chevrolet	104	2
43	15	Clint Bowyer	Michael Waltrip Racing	Toyota	46	1
Official Ford EcoBoost 400 results

=== Race statistics ===
- 18 lead changes among 8 different drivers
- 7 cautions for 30 laps
- Time of race: 3 hours, 2 minutes, 23 seconds
- Average speed: 131.755 mph (212.039 km/h)
- Kyle Busch took home $346,506 in winnings

Lap leaders
Laps	Leader
1-19	Joey Logano
20-35	Kyle Busch
36-44	Jeff Gordon
45-90	Kevin Harvick
91-92	Kyle Larson
93-138	Joey Logano
139	Kyle Busch
140-144	Carl Edwards
145-151	Joey Logano
152-154	Carl Edwards
155-168	Kyle Busch
169-171	Martin Truex Jr.
172-214	Brad Keselowski
215-216	Kyle Busch
217-257	Brad Keselowski
258	Kyle Busch
259-260	Brad Keselowski
261-267	Kyle Busch

Total laps led
Leader	Laps
Brad Keselowski	86
Joey Logano	72
Kevin Harvick	46
Kyle Busch	41
Jeff Gordon	9
Carl Edwards	8
Martin Truex Jr.	3
Kyle Larson	2

==== Race awards ====
- Coors Light Pole Award: Denny Hamlin (30.568, 176.655 mph (284.299 km/h))
- 3M Lap Leader: Brad Keselowski (86 laps)
- American Ethanol Green Flag Restart Award: Kyle Busch
- Duralast Brakes "Bake In The Race" Award: Joey Logano
- Freescale "Wide Open": Kevin Harvick
- Ingersoll Rand Power Move: Alex Bowman (5 positions)
- MAHLE Clevite Engine Builder of the Race: Roush-Yates Engines, #2
- Mobil 1 Driver of the Race: Kyle Busch (136.0 driver rating)
- Moog Steering and Suspension Problem Solver of The Race: Kurt Busch (crew chief Tony Gibson (0.117 seconds))
- NASCAR Sprint Cup Leader Bonus: Kyle Busch ($30,000)
- Sherwin-Williams Fastest Lap: Denny Hamlin (Lap 2, 30.717, 175.798 mph (282.919 km/h))
- Sunoco Rookie of The Race: Brett Moffitt

== Media ==
=== Television ===
NBC covered the race on the television side. Rick Allen, Jeff Burton and Steve Letarte had the call in the booth for the race. Dave Burns, Mike Massaro, Marty Snider and Kelli Stavast handled pit road on the television side. While the race itself aired on NBC, NBCSN aired NBCSN NASCAR Hot Pass, a simultaneous live feed dedicated to each of the Chase drivers, with commentary by Leigh Diffey and Dale Jarrett. Also, three different angles from in-car cameras and a track map tracked the driver's position and changes throughout the field.

NBC
Booth announcers	Pit reporters
Lap-by-lap: Rick Allen; Color-commentator: Jeff Burton; Color-commentator: Steve Letarte	Dave Burns; Mike Massaro; Marty Snider; Kelli Stavast

=== Radio ===
MRN had the radio call for the race, which was simulcast on Sirius XM NASCAR Radio. Joe Moore, Jeff Striegle and Rusty Wallace called the race from the booth when the field was racing down the frontstretch. Dave Moody called the race from a billboard outside turn 2 when the field was racing through turns 1 and 2. Mike Bagley called the race from a billboard outside turn 3 when the field was racing through turns 3 and 4. Alex Hayden, Winston Kelley and Steve Post handled pit road on the radio side.

MRN
Booth announcers	Turn announcers	Pit reporters
Lead announcer: Joe Moore; Announcer: Jeff Striegle; Announcer: Rusty Wallace	Turns 1 & 2: Dave Moody; Turns 3 & 4: Mike Bagley	Alex Hayden; Winston Kelley; Steve Post

== Final season standings ==
Drivers' Championship standings

	Pos	Driver	Points
2	1	Kyle Busch	5,043
1	2	Kevin Harvick	5,042 (–1)
1	3	Jeff Gordon	5,038 (–5)
	4	Martin Truex Jr.	5,032 (–11)
	5	Carl Edwards	2,368 (–2,675)
	6	Joey Logano	2,360 (–2,683)
1	7	Brad Keselowski	2,347 (–2,696)
1	8	Kurt Busch	2,333 (–2,710)
1	9	Denny Hamlin	2,327 (–2,716)
2	10	Jimmie Johnson	2,315 (–2,728)
	11	Ryan Newman	2,314 (–2,729)
5	12	Dale Earnhardt Jr.	2,310 (–2,733)
	13	Jamie McMurray	2,295 (–2,748)
	14	Paul Menard	2,262 (–2,781)
	15	Matt Kenseth	2,234 (–2,809)
	16	Clint Bowyer	2,175 (–2,868)

Manufacturers' Championship standings

Pos	Manufacturer	Points
1	Chevrolet	1,584
2	Toyota	1,516 (–68)
3	Ford	1,498 (–86)

- Note: Only the first sixteen positions are included for the driver standings.

== Note ==
Previous race: 2015 Quicken Loans Race for Heroes 500	Sprint Cup Series; 2015 season	Next race: 2016 Daytona 500
