= Nicole Briscoe =

American sportscaster (born 1980)

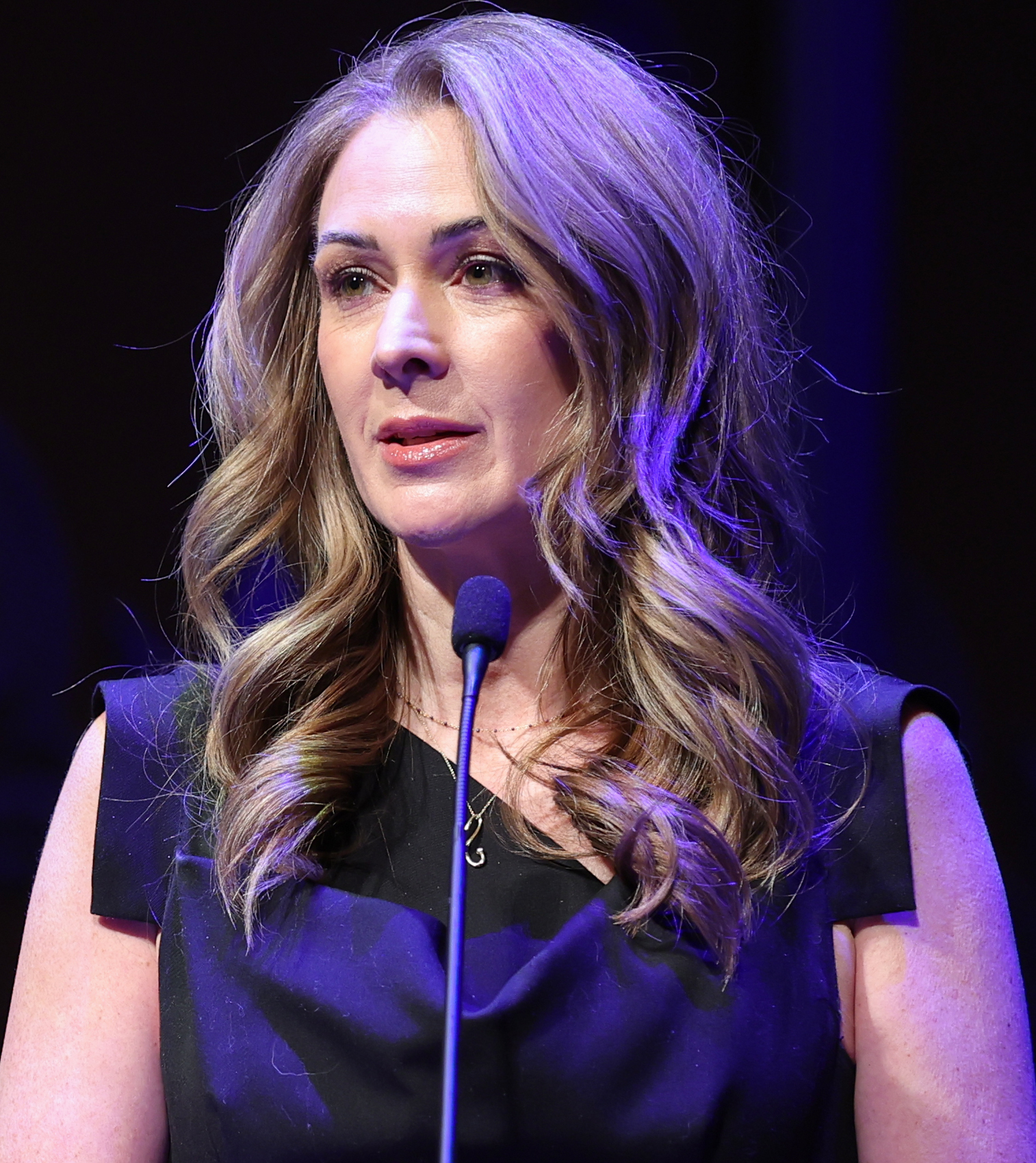
- Briscoe in 2026
- Born: Nicole Manske; July 2, 1980 (age 46); Wausau, Wisconsin, U.S.
- Education: Northern Illinois University
- Occupations: Broadcast journalist; sportscaster
- Years active: 1998–present
- Spouse: Ryan Briscoe (m. 2009)
- Children: 2

Nicole Briscoe (née Manske; born July 2, 1980) is an American sportscaster who is employed by ESPN. Originally focused on covering auto racing for the network, which included stints as the host of NASCAR Countdown and NASCAR Now, Briscoe became a SportsCenter anchor in 2015. She is married to IndyCar Series driver Ryan Briscoe.

== Early life ==
A native of Roscoe north of Rockford, Illinois, she graduated from Hononegah Community High School in Rockton, Illinois in 1998. She and future auto racer Danica Patrick were cheerleaders there in 1996. Briscoe also was in racing.

Briscoe was Miss Illinois Teen USA 1998 and competed in the Miss Teen USA pageant in Shreveport, Louisiana in August 1998. She was a semi-finalist in the pageant, placing third (of 10) in the evening gown competition, seventh in swimsuit, and tenth in interview. She was eighth overall on average. Two years after passing on her title, she competed in the Miss Illinois USA 2001 pageant finishing as first runner-up to Rebecca Ambrosi.

== Career ==
Briscoe attended Northern Illinois University in Dekalb, Illinois, earning her first job while at Northern Illinois for WREX-TV, the NBC station in Rockford. She worked as a general assignment reporter for WANE-TV in Fort Wayne, Indiana before reporting at WISH-TV in Indianapolis, Indiana, in April 2004. During her career at WISH-TV, she covered the Indianapolis 500, the United States Grand Prix, the NFL's Indianapolis Colts, and the NBA's Indiana Pacers. She was also a pit reporter for the Indianapolis Motor Speedway Radio Network. On the May 15, 2006 in the Indianapolis Star, Briscoe announced that she would be leaving WISH-TV for Speed Channel in Charlotte, North Carolina, with the 2006 Indianapolis 500 on May 28 being her last day.

Briscoe was the co-host of The Speed Report (formerly Speed News), a Sunday motorsports program on Speed Channel. She replaced Connie LeGrand, and hosted the show from July 1, 2006, to January 27, 2008, when she left to become the new host of the daily news show NASCAR Now on ESPN2.

From 2008 to 2014, Briscoe co-hosted the NASCAR pre-race shown on ESPN/ABC. Since 2015, she has worked as a SportsCenter anchor on ESPN.

== Personal life ==
She and Ryan Briscoe were married in an outdoor ceremony in Maui, Hawaii on December 19, 2009, and they have two daughters, Finley and Blake. In 2018, Ryan became a naturalized American citizen. In an April 2021 article in People about National Infertility Awareness Week, Nicole Briscoe talked about her "harrowing journey toward becoming a mother." She had six intrauterine inseminations, multiple rounds of in vitro fertilization and several miscarriages.

Preceded by Autumn Waterbury	Miss Illinois Teen USA; 1998	Succeeded by Amber Dusak
Preceded by Connie LeGrand (2002–2006) with Bob Varsha (1996–2006), Bob Jenkins (2005–2006), Ralph Sheheen (2004–2006), and Drew Johnson (2006–present)	Host of The Speed Report with Drew Johnson; 2006–2008	Succeeded by Krista Voda (part-time), and Bob Varsha
Preceded by Allen Bestwick and Ryan Burr (2007)	Host of NASCAR Now with Allen Bestwick and Ryan Burr; 2008–2014	Succeeded by Show discontinued
