= Marty Smith (reporter) =

American sports journalist (born 1976)

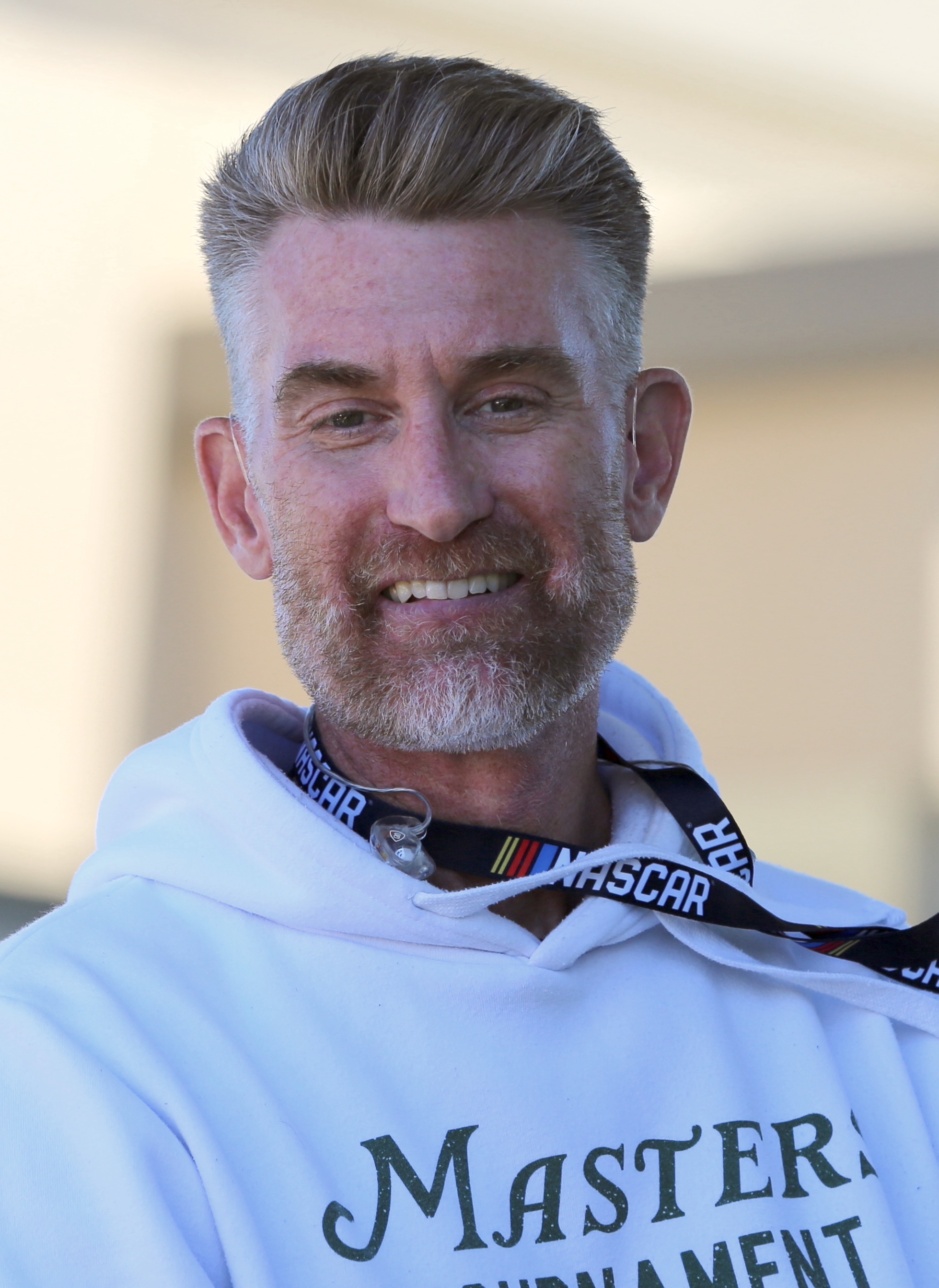
- Smith at Sonoma Raceway in 2026
- Born: April 15, 1976 (age 50); Pearisburg, Virginia, U.S.
- Education: Radford University
- Occupation: Television personality
- Notable credit: SportsCenter Presents: Marty Smith’s America

Martin Cameron Smith (born April 15, 1976) is an American sports journalist, best known for his work with ESPN. Smith was hired by the network in 2006 for NASCAR coverage. He hosted an interview show titled SportsCenter Presents: Marty Smith’s America.

== Early life ==
Smith is a native of Pearisburg, Virginia. He attended Giles High School, where he was a member of the school's 1993 state champion football team. Smith later attended Radford University.

After one year at Carson–Newman University, Smith transferred to Radford University and tried out for the Highlanders baseball team as a walk-on but was cut. He stayed at the school and graduated in 1998.

== Career ==
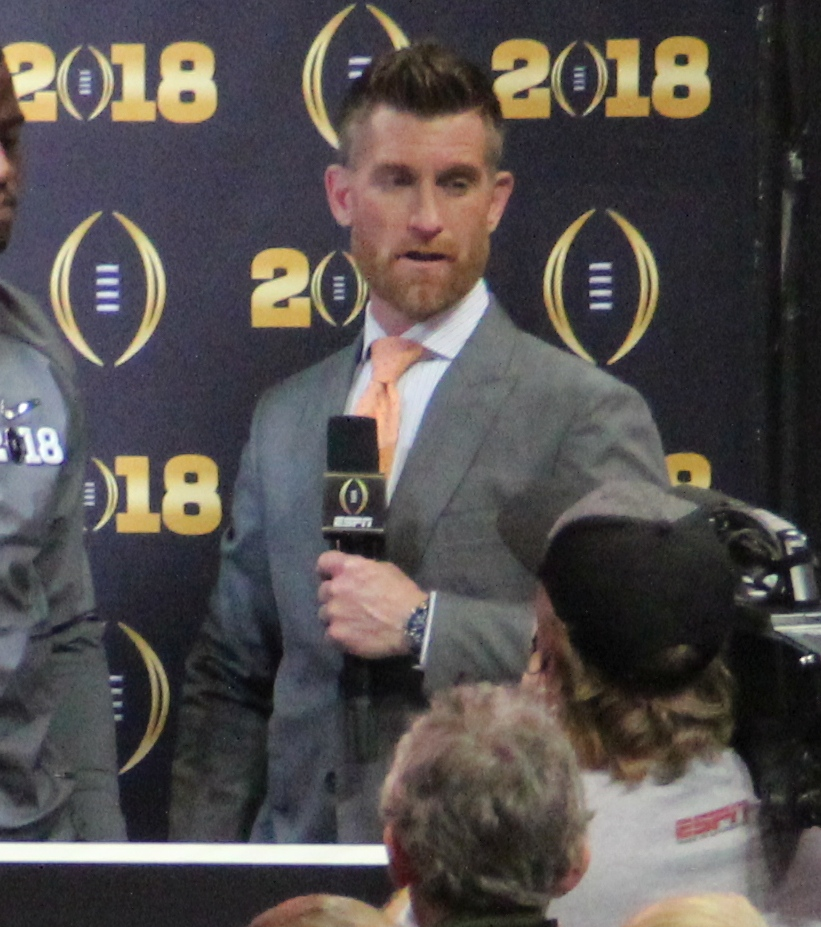
Smith in 2018

Smith started his career with The Roanoke Times covering high school sports and the New River Valley Speedway, while still attending college. As a senior, he was assigned by The Washington Post to be the beat writer for Virginia Tech football. (Note: occurs at 8:42) He started covering basketball as a reporter with The News & Advance. (Note: occurs at 9:10)

Smith was hired by NASCAR as a Senior Writer in 1999. (Note: occurs at 11:08)

Smith was hired by ESPN in 2006 to serve as their NASCAR reporter. In addition to coverage for SportsCenter, he also appeared on NASCAR Countdown and NASCAR Now.

In 2017, Smith hosted SportsCenter Presents: Marty Smith’s America, where he interviewed athletes such as Tim Tebow, Cristiano Ronaldo, and Cam Newton. In addition to appearances on SportsCenter and other ESPN shows, Smith hosts the Marty Smith's America podcast.

Smith co-hosts the Marty & McGee podcast alongside Ryan McGee. In 2015, the podcast was promoted to a regular weekend time slot on ESPN Radio and in 2018 a TV version of the show began on the SEC Network.

Smith covered Euro 2016 for ESPN including flying out to Iceland.

He was part of the team covering the 2025 Masters Tournament on behalf of ESPN, and will return for the 2026 tournament.

In 2026, Smith returned to covering NASCAR in a studio show on the TNT Sports portion of the Cup Series schedule.

== Personal life ==
Smith met his wife Lainie while attending Radford University. (Note: occurs at 7:23) His first child was born in 2005. (Note: occurs at 19:40) He and his wife have three children.
