= Tim Brewer =

NASCAR crew chief

Timothy Ivan Brewer (born February 4, 1955) is an American former stock car racing crew chief and television analyst for NASCAR on ESPN. He was part of NASCAR Countdown, the pre-race show, with host Brent Musburger and fellow analyst Brad Daugherty. He was also a contributor to NASCAR Now, the daily NASCAR information program on ESPN2. During each race, Brewer returned to the coverage to analyze race stories by using a "cut-away" car, which was a show car provided by Chevrolet.

Brewer won two championships as a crew chief working for owner Junior Johnson. His first was with driver Cale Yarborough in 1978 and his second was with Darrell Waltrip in 1981, though he was later replaced by Jeff Hammond. Incidentally, both worked for competing networks (Hammond at Fox NASCAR) in similar roles.

Brewer eventually moved to Morgan-McClure Motorsports. In 1997, he joined Geoff Bodine Racing as team manager, but became Geoff Bodine's crew chief during the August race at Bristol Motor Speedway; when Bodine fell two laps down, Brewer attempted to intervene in radio communications when crew chief Pat Tryson abruptly quit.

Brewer's drivers won 53 Cup points races and 55 Cup points pole positions. He is supported on the ESPN productions by Nelson Crozier, a premier innovator in the NASCAR environment for over 40 years.

With Nelson Crozier, Brewer was a partner in T and N Products, an intellectual properties LLC that has a patent pending on a unique safety indicating lug nut. Their company also serves as an expert witness for the major Detroit auto manufacturers and nationally known law firms.
