= Allen Bestwick =

American sportscaster (born 1961)

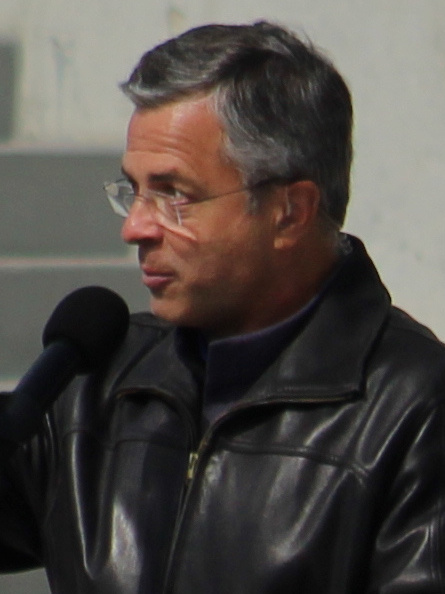
- Bestwick in 2021
- Born: September 24, 1961 (age 64); Newport, Rhode Island, U.S.
- Occupation: Sportscaster
- Employers: NBC (1999–2006); Turner Sports (2001–2006); ESPN (2007–2018, 2023)

Allen Bestwick (born September 24, 1961) is an American sportscaster. Known for his work covering NASCAR for NBC and ESPN, he is one of the lead track announcers at the Indianapolis Motor Speedway along with Dave Calabro. He formerly was the lead play-by-play voice for University of Connecticut women's basketball telecasts for SNY and the lead broadcaster for the Superstar Racing Experience.

== Early life and career ==
Bestwick was born in Newport, Rhode Island. His broadcasting career began at the age of 15, when he did on-air work for his high school radio station in Coventry, Rhode Island. Bestwick began announcing auto racing at age 16, when he called the action at Seekonk Speedway, where his father raced.

He then was hired by Charlie Roberts, founder of MotorNet in New Jersey, to be the radio network's Director of Affiliates and Associate Producer.

In 1985, Bestwick joined Motor Racing Network (MRN) as a race reporter and eventually became co-lead announcer with Joe Moore and Barney Hall. While still employed at MRN, Bestwick took over for Ken Squier as TBS' lead NASCAR commentator for its abbreviated schedule.

== NBC Sports and Turner Sports ==
Bestwick joined NBC in 1999 as its lap-by-lap commentator for its lone race, the Pennzoil 400 at Homestead-Miami Speedway. When NBC acquired rights to the second half of the NASCAR season, Bestwick was joined by Benny Parsons and Wally Dallenbach Jr. as the network's full-time broadcast team. Bestwick also continued to work for Turner Sports, as TNT served as NBC's broadcast partner on cable.

In 2005, Bestwick and Bill Weber switched positions on the broadcast. Bestwick took Weber's position as lead pit reporter while Weber, who had substituted for Bestwick for two races in 2004 as he recuperated from a broken leg, moved to the booth. Bestwick substituted for Weber from 2005 to 2006 at Standalone Busch Series races.

Also in 2005, Bestwick made a cameo appearance as himself, being the lead announcer, in the movie Herbie: Fully Loaded. During his tenure at NBC, Bestwick also called Arena football games, as well as other minor duties.

After NBC lost rights to NASCAR following the 2006 season, Bestwick decided to leave the network after seven years. Despite TNT retaining its NASCAR rights in the new contract that was signed, Bestwick opted not to stay with them and instead signed on with ESPN.

== ESPN ==
For 2007, Bestwick joined the NASCAR on ESPN package as lead pit reporter, as well as occasionally being race coverage host and play-by-play announcer on Nationwide Series races, and occasional NASCAR Now hosting duties. In 2008, he was moved up to full-time race coverage host and hosts a weekly Monday roundtable edition of NASCAR Now. As lead pit reporter, from 2008 to 2010, he also hosted NASCAR Countdown.

On July 20, 2011, it was announced that Bestwick would replace Marty Reid for the 17 Sprint Cup races hosted by ESPN alongside Dale Jarrett and Andy Petree. Nicole Briscoe would replace him as host of NASCAR Countdown alongside Rusty Wallace and Brad Daugherty. Bestwick replaced Marty Reid as play-by-play announcer for the Sprint Cup Series races starting at the Brickyard 400, returning him to the position for the first time since 2004. Bestwick also called the Nationwide Series for the remainder of the 2013 season after Reid was fired from ESPN.

With the end of ESPN's NASCAR coverage after the 2014 season, Bestwick became the lead announcer for ESPN's broadcasts of IndyCar races for ABC beginning in 2014, also replacing Reid. Bestwick also began to perform play-by-play duties for non-racing events, including college football.

On Halloween night in 2015, Bestwick called the Miami-Duke college football game, when Miami was down 27–24 with 6 seconds in the game and won the game on a controversial kickoff return touchdown after lateraling the ball eight times.

Taken short... lateral... they practiced that on Wednesday. Time's going to expire on the game, so this either goes or this doesn't. Ball's still alive! It's got to be a backwards lateral! Get behind it... still alive. They've got blockers, they've got blockers! They've got a lane! 40 yard line! No black shirts between the goal line! CAN YOU BELIEVE WHAT YOU JUST SAW?!?!

On April 28, 2017, Bestwick confirmed that he was being released by ESPN after the 2017 IndyCar double-header Detroit Grand Prix and would call his last Indy 500. However, in February 2018, ESPN announced that they would be bringing Bestwick back to call the Indy 500 in 2018.

In 2023, the Superstar Racing Experience signed a deal with ESPN to broadcast the 2023 season on their channels with Allen Bestwick returning as play by play commentator for the broadcasts.

== CBS ==
On April 14, 2021, it was announced that Bestwick will be the play–by–play commentator for the Superstar Racing Experience (SRX) racing series for CBS starting in 2021. Bestwick also did PA work for IMS during the Month of May the same year in addition to the NASCAR-IndyCar doubleheader weekend in August.

In the summer and autumn of 2022, Bestwick was a sideline reporter during the inaugural season of the Professional Bull Riders (PBR) Team Series.

| Preceded by Marty Reid | Television voice of the Indianapolis 500; 2014–2018 | Succeeded by Leigh Diffey |
