= Connie LeGrand =

American television journalist

- Born: Columbus, Ohio, U.S.
- Other name: Connie Laurens
- Education: Clemson University; University of Georgia
- Occupation: Television journalist
- Children: 1

Connie LeGrand (born in Columbus, Ohio) is an American television journalist who has served in broadcasting in South Carolina and was host of Speed News (now The Speed Report) from 2004 to 2006.

== Early years ==
Growing up in "Bobby Rahal country," LeGrand attended her first auto race in the 1980s: The Indianapolis 500. She went on to graduate from Clemson University with a degree in marketing. LeGrand would then earn a Master's degree from the University of Georgia before going into broadcasting. While attending UGA, LeGrand worked as a radio announcer for Athens radio station 960 AM WRFC and sister station Bulldog 103.7 under the pseudonym Connie Laurens.

== Professional career ==
She served as co-host of Speed News (now The Speed Report), a motorsports news program (30 minutes during motorsports season on Saturdays and 60 minutes on Sundays) produced by Speed Channel, with Drew Johnson. She was on the show from 2004 to June 25, 2006. During the first part of the 2004 NASCAR Cup Series season, LeGrand also anchored the Speed TV series NASCAR Nation.

Prior to her position at Speed Channel, LeGrand served as a correspondent with WSPA-TV from 1996 to 1999 in Spartanburg, South Carolina, which at the time was the CBS affiliate for Upstate South Carolina and Western North Carolina (Greenville, South Carolina, Anderson, South Carolina, Spartanburg, South Carolina, and Asheville, North Carolina).

During the 1990s, WSPA-TV assisted WHNS-TV in their television news development. When the Fox affiliate finally got its own production staff, LeGrand was the only WSPA-TV correspondent to remain with WHNS-TV. For her efforts, LeGrand was promoted to the main female news anchor position in 1997, a position she would hold until her move to Speed Channel in 2004.

In the 2006/2007 academic year, LeGrand was an instructor of in Mass Communication in the Department of Fine Arts and Communication Studies at the University of South Carolina Upstate in Spartanburg. She returned to WSPA-TV as 5:30 weeknight anchor in January 2007 and also covered education and health issues for the affiliate. In December 2010, LeGrand became Director of Marketing and Public Relations for the Mary Black Health System, an integrated healthcare delivery system in Spartanburg, South Carolina.

== Personal life ==
LeGrand is divorced and lives in Spartanburg, South Carolina. She has a son named Cole and a black Labrador Retriever named "Big Dog". She currently works at the High Point Academy high school as the head of media.

== Sources ==
- Mary Black Health System. Press Release: LeGrand Named Director of Marketing and Public Relations of Mary Black Health System. December 20, 2010
- University of South Carolina Upstate. "Forty New Faculty Members Contribute To Economic Impact". August 16, 2006
- WSPA TV. Profile for Connie LeGrand

Preceded by Dave Despain (2000–2001) and Bob Varsha (1996–2006) (then Speedvision News Race Week)	Host of Speed News with Bob Varsha (1996–2006), Bob Jenkins (2005–06), Ralph Sheehan (2004–06), and Drew Johnson (2006–2013); 2002–2006	Succeeded by Drew Johnson and Nicole Manske (2006–2008)
