= NASCAR Now =

- Starring: Allen Bestwick; Mike Massaro; Nicole Briscoe; Shannon Spake
- Country of origin: United States

Production
- Running time: 30 minutes

Original release
- Network: ESPN2
- Release: February 5, 2007 – June 11, 2014

NASCAR Now was a NASCAR news and analysis show that aired year round Tuesday through Saturday as a thirty-minute show at 2:00am ET on ESPN2. NASCAR Now, that debuted on February 5, 2007, was broadcast in HD from Bristol, Connecticut and also had a daily segment on SportsCenter. ESPN2 also aired editions of the show on the day of all NASCAR Sprint Cup Series races, starting with the Daytona 500. A race preview show aired at 10 A.M. ET on race day, with a post-race edition running on ESPN2 on the evening following the event.

Unlike its predecessor, RPM 2Night, NASCAR Now covered only NASCAR news and information and there were no highlight restrictions on the program; both video and still photos were available for its use. It was part of ESPN's new television package with NASCAR, which gave them the opportunity to produce and air a daily show about the sanctioning body. Previously, Speed Channel had the exclusive rights to produce daily NASCAR magazine shows.

Beginning in 2012, the start time of the show was moved from a 5:00pm ET to a 2:00am ET start time due to other conflicts on the network. The show remained on ESPN2. On June 23, 2014 ESPN announced that it had cancelled NASCAR Now.

== Personalities ==
The lead host of the show was former Speed Channel anchor Nicole Briscoe. Mike Massaro was also another regular host, and Allen Bestwick hosted a special "roundtable" edition of the show on Mondays from 2008 to 2010. Bestwick also hosted regular editions of the show on other days. In 2008, Marty Smith was named lead reporter for the program after being a "NASCAR Insider" for the show in 2007. NASCAR Insiders for the program included award-winning journalists Tim Cowlishaw, Angelique Chengelis, Terry Blount and David Newton. The program also included current drivers Stacy Compton and Boris Said.

Here is a list of all of the past personalities on NASCAR Now.

=== Former ===
Hosts

- Allen Bestwick: (host, 2007–2014)
- Mike Massaro: (host, 2009–2014) (correspondent, 2007–2014)
- Nicole Briscoe: (host, 2008–2014) (correspondent, 2008–2014)
- Shannon Spake: (host, 2010–2014) (correspondent, 2007–2014)
- Doug Banks: (host, 2007)
- Erik Kuselias: (host, 2007)
- Chris Fowler: (host, 2007)
- Ryan Burr: (host, 2007–2008)

Analysts

- Tim Brewer: (lead analyst, 2007–2014)
- Stacy Compton: (lead analyst, 2007)
- Tim Cowlishaw: (analyst, 2007–2009)
- Brad Daugherty: (lead analyst, 2007–2014)
- Mark Johnson: (analyst, 2007–2014)
- Boris Said: (analyst, 2007–2009)
- Rusty Wallace: (analyst, 2007–2014)
- Ray Evernham: (analyst, 2008–2010)
- Christopher Harris: (fantasy analyst, 2007–2014)

Reporters

- Marty Smith: (lead reporter, 2007–2014)
- David Newton: (reporter, 2007–2014)
- Terry Blount: (reporter, 2007–2014)
- Angelique Chengelis: (reporter, 2007–2014)
- Ryan McGee: (reporter/analyst, 2009–2014)

=== Special co-hosts ===
- Ricky Craven: (co-host on post/pre-race shows, 2008–2014)

=== Fill-in hosts ===
- Mike Yam: (host, 2011–2014)
- Marty Reid: (host, 2012–2014)
- Jonathan Coachman: (host, 2012–2014)

== Segments ==
NASCAR Now featured numerous segments that appear both during the show and also during evening editions of SportsCenter. Some of the segments are listed below.

- Pit Pass: This segment mostly appeared during SportsCenter, when they ran through the top stories in NASCAR with news, analysis and debate.
- Starting Grid: This was the opening segment of the program when they run through the top stories at the hour in the world of NASCAR.
- Under the Hood: This segment appeared before every commercial break when the host runs through everything coming up on the show.
- Over the Wall: This segment appeared every week when D. J. Copp went over what to watch out for during pit stops on Sunday.

== Special episodes ==
On April 29, 2008, the show hosted a special one-hour edition of NASCAR Now to commemorate Dale Earnhardt Day.

On August 19, 2009, President Barack Obama did a live interview on the program after honoring the defending Sprint Cup Series champion Jimmie Johnson and the rest of the 2008 Chase for the Sprint Cup drivers at the White House.

== See also ==
- NASCAR on ESPN
- NASCAR Countdown
- ESPN2 Garage
