= Ryan Burr =

American sports journalist (born 1972)

Ryan Burr (born March 17, 1972, Pittsburgh, Pennsylvania) is a sports television journalist. Burr worked for the NBC Sports Group from 2012 to 2021, with his duties mainly consisting of hosting all programs on Golf Channel and college basketball coverage. For college basketball, he mainly works as a play-by-play announcer on East Coast telecasts airing on the NBC Sports Network. Before joining the NBC Sports Group, Burr was previously a studio host and SportsCenter anchor for ESPN. Burr is the founder of the Notah Begay Junior Golf National Championship which is broadcast on Golf Channel. In 2025 10 thousand junior golfers played the tour. Burr currently broadcasts College golf on golf channel and the PGA Tour on ESPN+.

== Early life and career ==
Burr grew up in Pittsburgh and graduated in 1994 from the Newhouse School of Public Communications at Syracuse University, earning a bachelor's degree in Broadcast Journalism. While a student at Syracuse, Burr regularly worked as a television play-by-play announcer, studio host, and radio personality for several media outlets.

== Career ==
In 1994, Burr began working as a play-by-play announcer and studio host for Time Warner in Clearwater, Florida.

Prior to joining ESPN, Burr worked at Fox Sports Net in Pittsburgh, (serving the pre-game host for the Pirates and Penguins telecasts) and ABC owned and operated station WTVG-TV in Toledo, Ohio. Previously he was sports director WKTV-TV in Utica, New York where he received a local AP Broadcaster-of-the-Year award, and at Channel 9 in Tampa, Florida.

=== At ESPN ===
Burr left FSN in Pittsburgh in August 2005 for Bristol, Connecticut. He began working for ESPNews. In April 2007 he was named a host of NASCAR Now, ESPN's first daily program dedicated solely to NASCAR news and information. In November 2008 Burr moved to the college basketball studios where he was named host of the ESPN program Midnight Madness (now College Basketball Final). Burr worked on SportsCenter and anchored the 6pm SportsCenter every Saturday and Sunday. In addition he hosted college football and college basketball for ESPN, as a host for College Football Live & College Basketball Final.

On March 13, 2012, Burr created controversy by sending out a message on his Twitter account to Nerlens Noel, the #1 player in 2012 high school class, that he should come to Syracuse (Burr's alma mater) to replace Fab Melo, who earlier in the day was ruled academically ineligible and is expected to enter the upcoming NBA Draft.

On July 2, 2012, he announced he would leaving ESPN for NBC Sports and the Golf Channel.

In 2021, Burr called men's and women's tennis events in the 2020 Tokyo Olympics.

In 2022, Burr went back to ESPN to cover the PGA Tours.

== Works ==
Burr published his first novel in 2014 titled "The Fix" a nonfiction tale about a college football player who gets caught up in gambling.
