= Dave Burns (sportscaster) =

American motorsports commentator

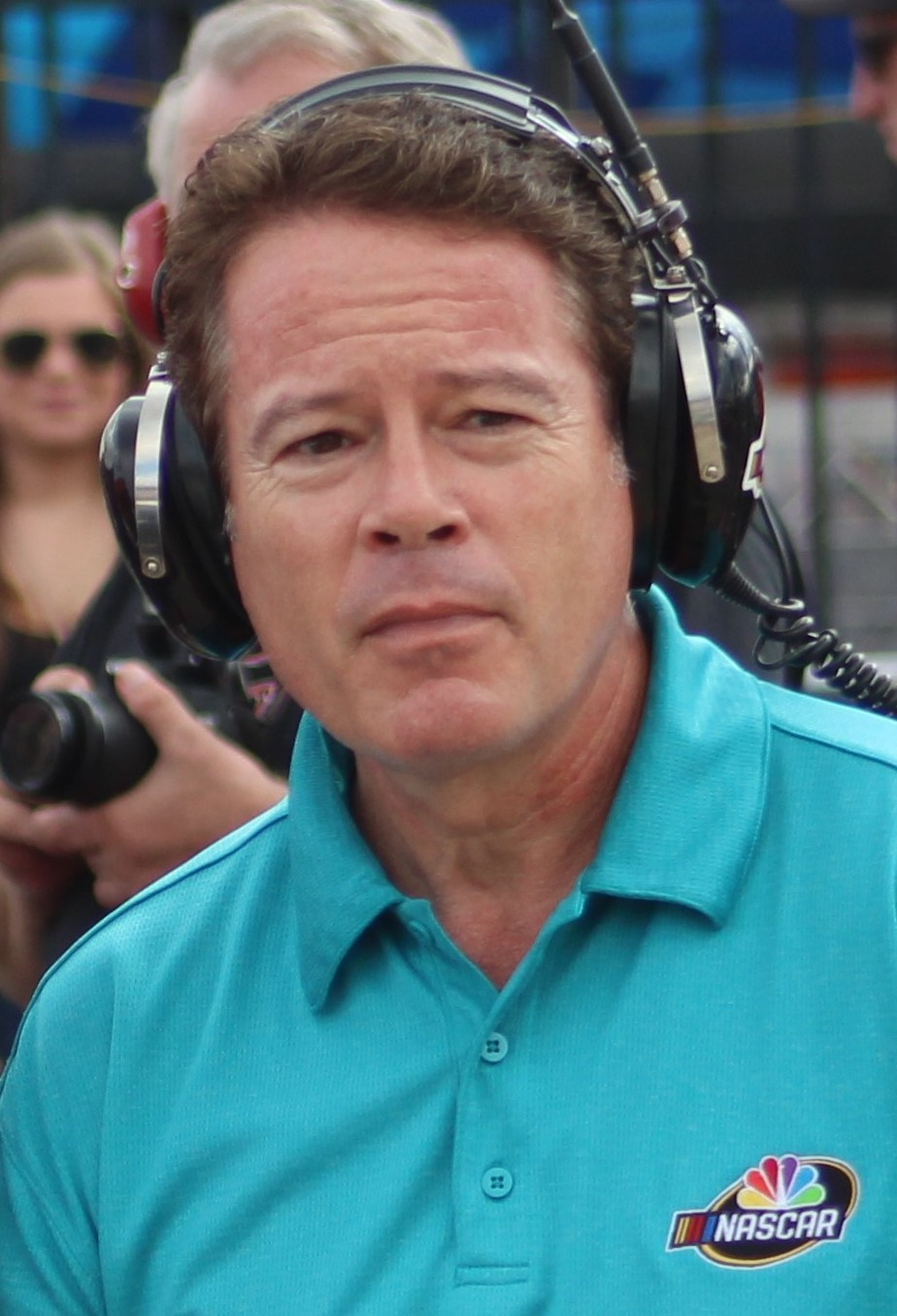
- Burns in 2018
- Born: David Burns; 1963 (age 61–62); Kalamazoo, Michigan, U.S.
- Occupation: TV sports announcer
- Years active: 1996–present
- Known for: Reporter on NASCAR on NBC
- Spouse: (Married)
- Children: 1

David Burns (born 1963) is an American sportscaster who works for NASCAR on NBC as a pit reporter for the NASCAR Cup Series and Xfinity Series as well as a substitute play-by-play on standalone Xfinity Series races. He has been a motorsports analyst for over 25 years and counting.

== Career ==
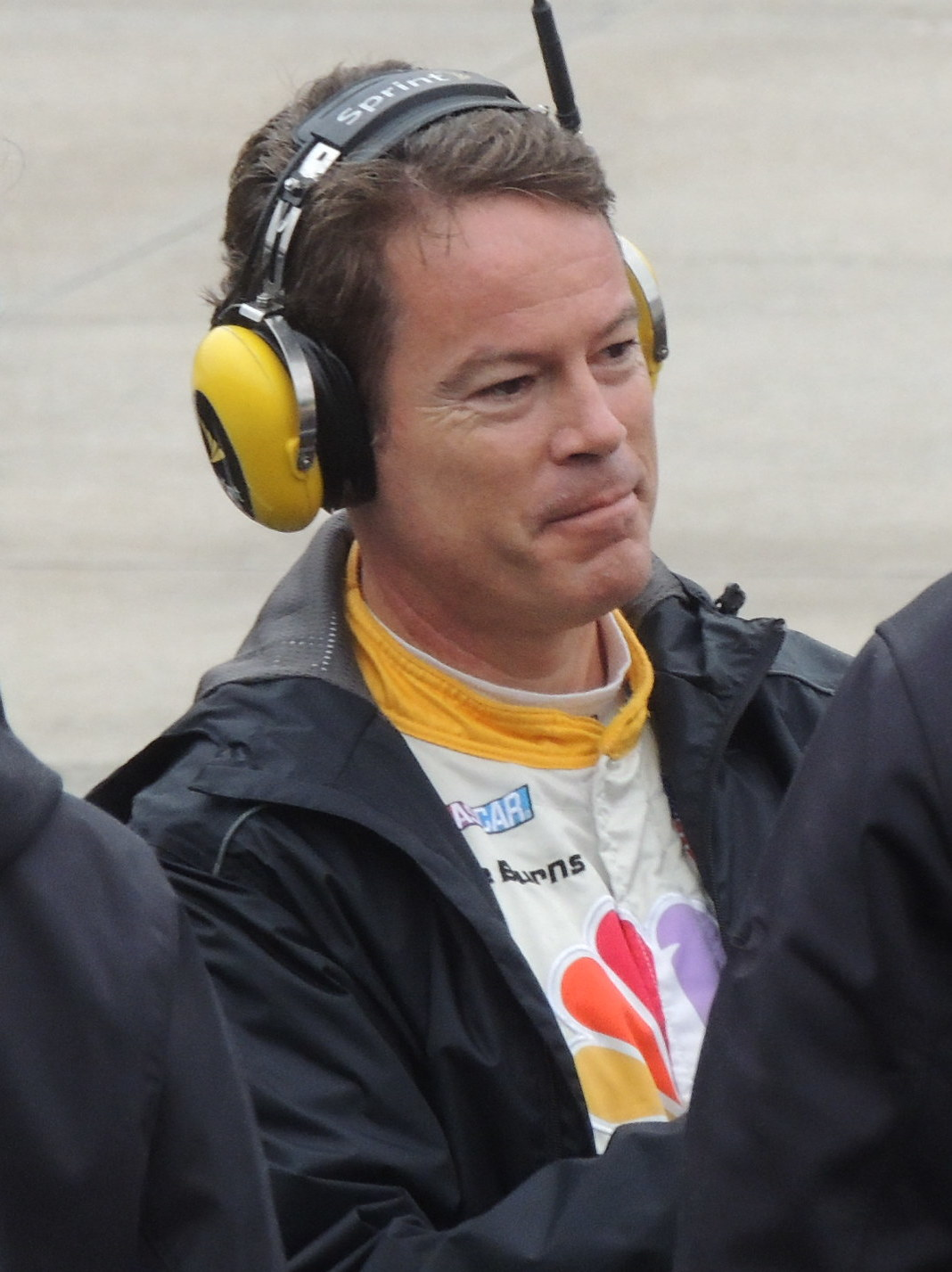
Burns in his first year back with NBC in 2015

After ESPN lost its rights to broadcasting NASCAR races, Burns returned to NBC (who replaced TNT and ESPN after outbidding both networks for the TV coverage) and became one of four pit reporters for the network's Cup and Xfinity Series (previously Nationwide) events, along with Mike Massaro (who also moved over from ESPN), Marty Snider (who also was a NASCAR on NBC pit reporter with Burns from 2001 to 2006), and Kelli Stavast. Burns and Massaro were signed by NBC to join the broadcast team on November 6, 2014.

== Personal life ==
Burns grew up in Kalamazoo, Michigan and graduated from Kalamazoo Central High School in 1981. He then attended Taylor University. Since working in the NASCAR industry, he has lived in Concord, North Carolina, which is in the Charlotte metropolitan area where NASCAR teams are based.
