= NASCAR Countdown =

- Starring: Nicole Briscoe; Brad Daugherty; Rusty Wallace; Andy Petree; Dale Jarrett
- Country of origin: United States

Production
- Running time: 1 hour (NSCS); 30 minutes (NNS)

Original release
- Network: ESPN; ESPN2; ABC
- Release: February 17, 2007 – November 16, 2014

NASCAR Countdown is a NASCAR Sprint Cup Series and Nationwide Series prerace show that debuted on February 17, 2007. It was a live on-site pre-race show for all Sprint Cup and Nationwide Series races televised on ESPN, ESPN2 and ABC. It came as a result of ESPN getting broadcast rights to NASCAR races, including the Chase for the Sprint Cup.

The program was also available in high-definition on either ESPN, ESPN2 or ABC. Along with the press release of this program, ESPN also announced plans for a daily show devoted to NASCAR entitled NASCAR Now. NASCAR Countdown was telecast from a new, state-of-the-art mobile pit studio, similar to NASCAR on Fox's "Hollywood Hotel."

At Sprint Cup events, the program was always hosted by Nicole Briscoe. Joining Briscoe was five-time NBA All-Star and former winning NASCAR team owner Brad Daugherty and former Cup champion Rusty Wallace. Andy Petree and Dale Jarrett also contributed to the program from the broadcast booth.

== Variations ==
- On February 17, at the Orbitz 300 at Daytona International Speedway, Brent Musburger broadcast from a separate studio between turns 3 and 4, while Chris Fowler took his place in the pit studio alongside Daugherty and Tim Brewer. Both sets were used in the program.
- On March 4, Fowler substituted for Musburger again, this time as the only host. ESPN did not explain Musburger's absence, but the race was held in Mexico City and it is possible that Musburger could not enter Mexico due to a lack of a valid passport. (Since January 23, 2007, U.S. Immigration and Customs Enforcement, or ICE for short, has required all visitors from the U.S. to either Canada or Mexico to carry passports in those countries. The law took immediate effect for air travelers, such as those working the NASCAR on ESPN broadcasts.)
- On March 10, the first of the six races on broadcast sister ABC, the two-studio setup returned at Las Vegas Motor Speedway and Musburger and Fowler co-hosted once again.
- In addition to Musburger and Fowler, Erik Kuselias and Allen Bestwick have served as hosts.
- Countdown was pre-empted in consecutive weeks on April 7 and 14 because women's tennis matches, the preceding programs on ESPN2, ran long both weeks. It was also pre-empted on October 13 because the Arizona-Southern California football game ran longer than anticipated that day.
- Musburger returned as the host for the June 30, 2007 Busch Series telecast from New Hampshire on ABC.

== See also ==
- NASCAR on ESPN
- NASCAR Now
- ESPN auto racing broadcast teams
