= Mike Massaro =

American sportscaster

- Born: Michael Massaro; August 7, 1970 (age 54); Manchester, Connecticut, U.S.
- Occupation: TV sportscaster
- Employer(s): NASCAR on ESPN, NASCAR on NBC, ARCA on MAVTV, RFK Racing

Michael Massaro (born August 7, 1970) is an American sportscaster and journalist. He has worked for RFK Racing in their Marketing and Communications department since 2025. He previously worked as a pit reporter and host for NASCAR on ESPN from 2007 to 2014, a pit reporter for NASCAR on NBC from 2015 to 2016 and a pit reporter for the ARCA Menards Series on MAVTV in 2022.

== Career ==
Massaro was born and raised in Manchester, Connecticut. He worked as a pit reporter for NASCAR on ESPN and also hosted NASCAR Now, a NASCAR news and highlights show, from 2009 to 2014. He had previously worked as a reporter for RPM 2Night during ESPN's first stint covering NASCAR which ended in 2000 (and 2002 for the Truck Series).

In late 2014, Massaro would join NASCAR on NBC as a pit reporter for Cup and Xfinity Series races starting in 2015.

In December 2016, Massaro announced on his Facebook page that he would not be returning to NASCAR on NBC in 2017. Parker Kligerman would replace him as a pit reporter on NBC's Cup and Xfinity Series broadcasts. Massaro would remain with NBC and join NBC Connecticut as a news reporter. In 2022, Massaro returned to calling races as the pit reporter for MAVTV's ARCA Menards Series races, replacing Dave Reiff. MAVTV would lose the TV rights for ARCA to Fox in 2023, leaving Massaro without a job.

On January 23, 2025, it was announced that Massaro would be returning to NASCAR in 2025, working for RFK Racing on their Marketing and Communications staff.
