= List of Indianapolis 500 broadcasters =

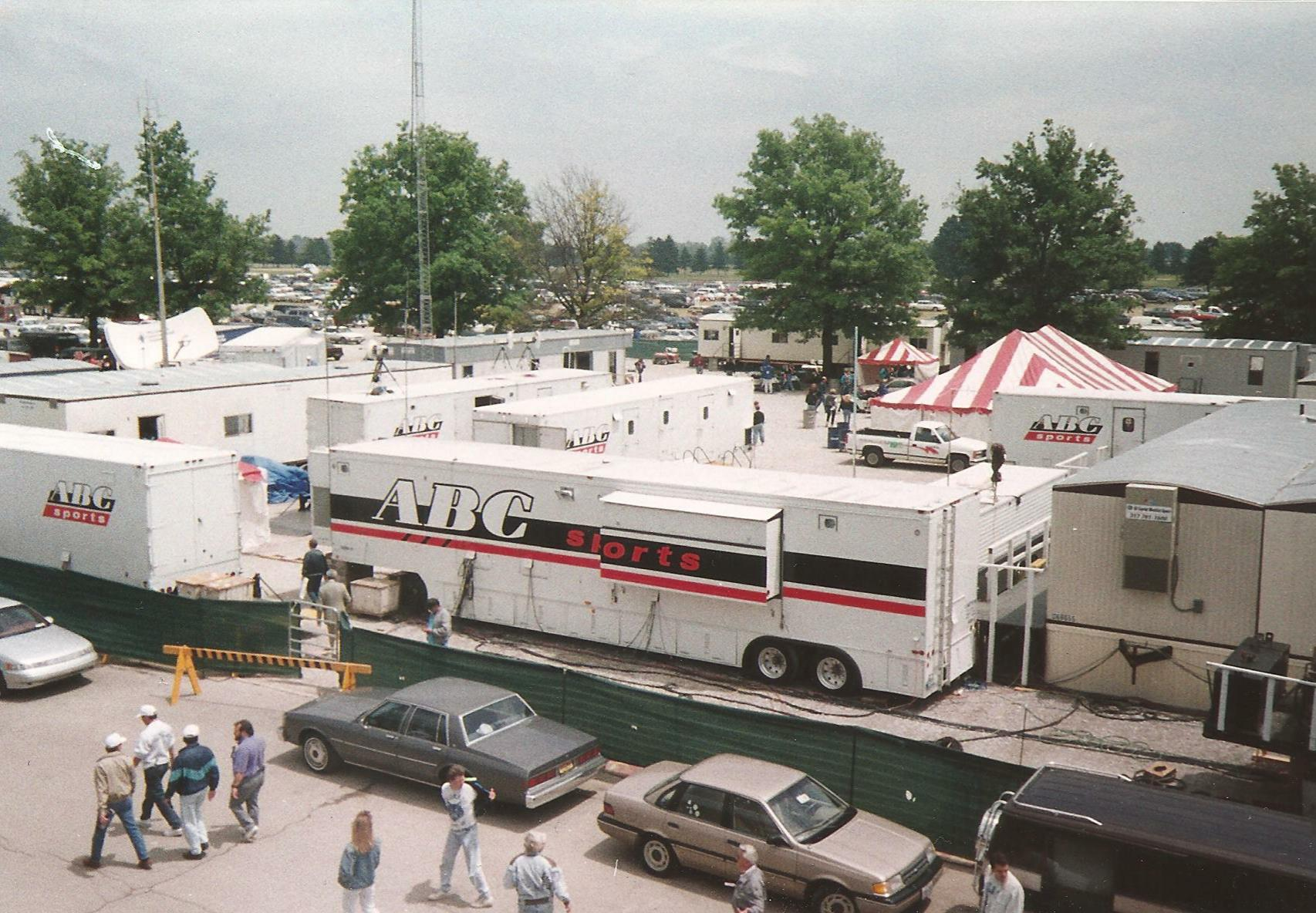
The ABC-TV Sports broadcasting complex at the 1993 Indianapolis 500.

The Indianapolis 500 has been broadcast on network television in the United States since 1965. As of 2025, the race airs on FOX. From 1965 to 2018, the event was broadcast by ABC, making it the second-longest-running relationship between an individual sporting event and television network, surpassed only by CBS Sports' relationship with the Masters Tournament (since 1956). In 2014, ABC celebrated fifty years televising the Indianapolis 500, not including 1961 through 1964 when reports and highlights of time trials were aired on ABC's Wide World of Sports. From 2019 to 2024, the race aired on NBC.

From 1965 to 1970, ABC televised a combination of filmed and/or taped recorded highlights of the race the following weekend on their flagship anthology series Wide World of Sports. The 1965 and 1966 presentations were in black-and-white, while all subsequent presentations have been in color. From 1971 to 1985, the Indianapolis 500 was shown on a same-day tape delay basis. Races were edited to a two-hour or three-hour broadcast, and shown in prime time.

Starting in 1986, the race has been shown live in "flag-to-flag" coverage. In the Indianapolis market, as well as other parts of Indiana, the live telecast is blacked out and shown tape delayed to encourage gate attendance. Through 1991, the local tape-delay broadcast aired one or two weeks after the race, and during the 1970s, it aired as long a month after the race. In 1992 the local tape-delay broadcast was pushed forward to same-day tape on Sunday evening. In 2016, the tickets for the race were completely sold out, such that the local blackout was lifted for that year. Since 2007, the race has been aired in high definition.

Currently, the television voice of the Indy 500 is Will Buxton, a role he will assume for the first time in 2025. Previous television anchors include Chris Schenkel, Jim McKay, Keith Jackson, Jim Lampley, Paul Page, Bob Jenkins, Todd Harris, Marty Reid, and Allen Bestwick (all of ABC); followed by Leigh Diffey, who called the race on NBC in 2019–2024. Other longtime fixtures of the broadcast include Jack Arute, Sam Posey, Jackie Stewart, Chris Economaki, Bobby Unser, Jerry Punch, and Scott Goodyear.

On August 10, 2011, ABC extended their exclusive contract to carry the Indianapolis 500 through 2018. Starting in 2014, the contract also includes live coverage of the IndyCar Grand Prix on the road course.

In 2019, the Indianapolis 500 moved to NBC, as part of a new three-year contract that unifies the IndyCar Series' television rights with NBC Sports (the parent division of IndyCar's then-current cable partner NBCSN), and replaces the separate package of five races broadcast by ABC. The Indianapolis 500 is one of eight races televised by NBC as part of the new deal, which ended ABC's 54-year tenure as broadcaster of the event. WTHR is the local broadcaster of the race under this contract; the existing blackout policy is expected to continue should the race not sell out. As no spectators were allowed for the 2020 Indianapolis 500, the race was aired live in the Indianapolis market. Two subsequent live broadcasts occurred in 2021, when the number of spectators was limited under local public health orders, and 2024, after a significant weather delay.

Fox Sports took over rights to IndyCar, including the Indianapolis 500, beginning in 2025. The Speedway is expected to continue to enforce the live local blackout on Indianapolis Fox affiliate WXIN. After a grandstand sellout was announced, however, the local blackout was lifted for 2025. WXIN initially prepared to broadcast Memorial Day related programs in the window that networks like FOX would have used to air prime time programs in a transposed broadcast.

== Live coverage ==
=== FOX era ===
Year	Network	Pre-race	Lap-by-lap announcer	Color commentator	Pit reporters	Features reporters
2026	FOX	Chris Myers (Host); Danica Patrick (Studio Analyst); Tony Stewart (Studio Analyst)	Will Buxton	Townsend Bell; James Hinchcliffe; Jack Harvey (reports)	Georgia Henneberry; Kevin Lee; Jamie Little	Tom Rinaldi
2025	FOX	Chris Myers (Host); Danica Patrick (Studio Analyst); Tony Stewart (Studio Analyst)	Will Buxton	Townsend Bell; James Hinchcliffe; Jack Harvey (reports)	Georgia Henneberry; Kevin Lee; Jamie Little	Erin Andrews; Tom Rinaldi

=== NBC era ===
Year	Network	Pre-race	Lap-by-lap announcer	Color commentator	Pit reporters	Roving Reporters
2024	NBC	Mike Tirico (Host); Danica Patrick (Studio Analyst); Jimmie Johnson (Studio Analyst)	Leigh Diffey	Townsend Bell; James Hinchcliffe	Marty Snider; Dave Burns; Kevin Lee; Dillon Welch	Jeff Burton; Kim Coon
2023	NBC	Mike Tirico (Host); Danica Patrick (Studio Analyst)	Leigh Diffey	Townsend Bell; James Hinchcliffe	Marty Snider; Dave Burns; Kevin Lee; Dillon Welch	Dale Earnhardt Jr. Steve Letarte
2022	NBC	Mike Tirico (Host); Danica Patrick (Studio Analyst)	Leigh Diffey	Townsend Bell; James Hinchcliffe	Marty Snider; Dave Burns; Kevin Lee; Dillon Welch	Dale Earnhardt Jr. Rutledge Wood
2021	NBC	Mike Tirico (NBC Host); Jac Collinsworth (NBCSN Host); Danica Patrick (Studio Analyst); Jimmie Johnson (Studio Analyst); Steve Letarte (Studio Analyst)	Leigh Diffey	Townsend Bell; Paul Tracy	Marty Snider; Kelli Stavast; Dave Burns; Kevin Lee	Dale Earnhardt Jr. Rutledge Wood
2020	NBC	Mike Tirico (Host); Danica Patrick (Studio Analyst)	Leigh Diffey	Townsend Bell; Paul Tracy (turn two)	Marty Snider; Kelli Stavast; Kevin Lee	Rutledge Wood
2019	NBC	Mike Tirico (NBC Host); Krista Voda (NBCSN Host); Danica Patrick (Studio Analyst)	Leigh Diffey	Townsend Bell; Paul Tracy	Marty Snider; Kelli Stavast; Jon Beekhuis; Kevin Lee	Dale Earnhardt Jr. Rutledge Wood; Robin Miller; Dillon Welch

- Dillon Welch is the first second-generation broadcaster to be involved in the race telecast. His father Vince worked the race in the ABC era until 2014.

=== ABC era ===
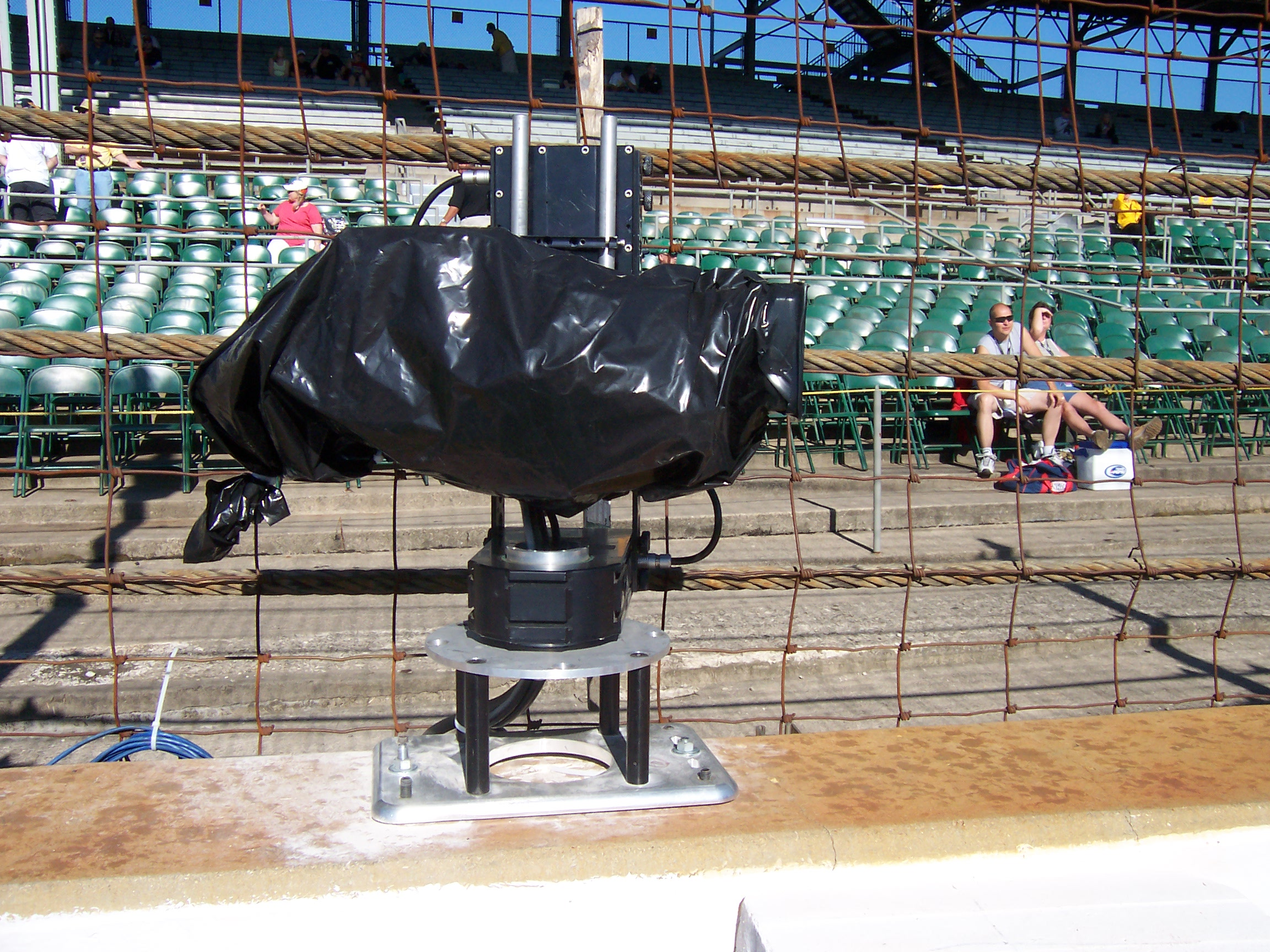
ABC Sports television camera mounted along the outside wall at the Indianapolis Motor Speedway for the 2005 Indianapolis 500.

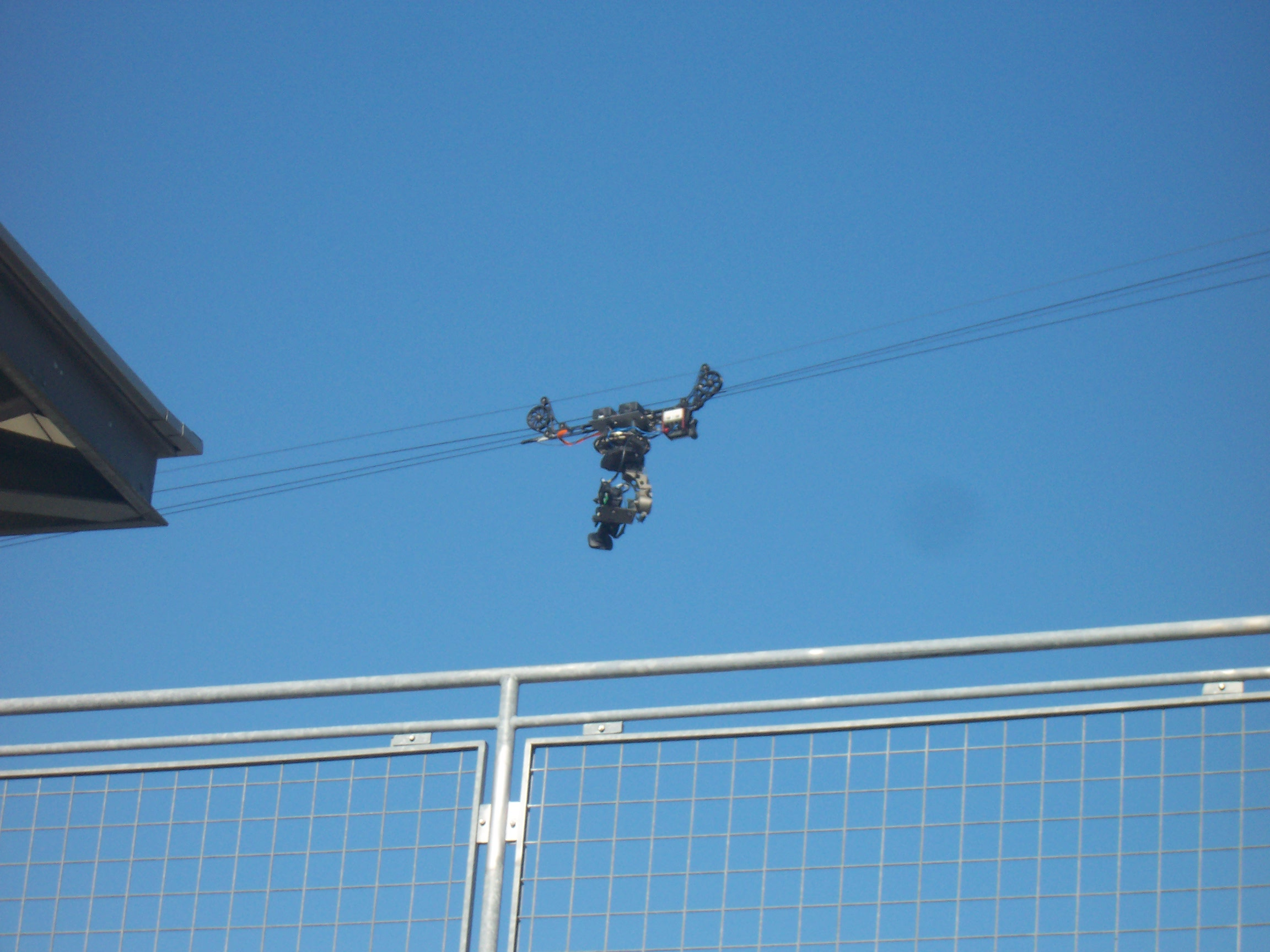
ABC Sports Skycam at the 2008 Indianapolis 500.

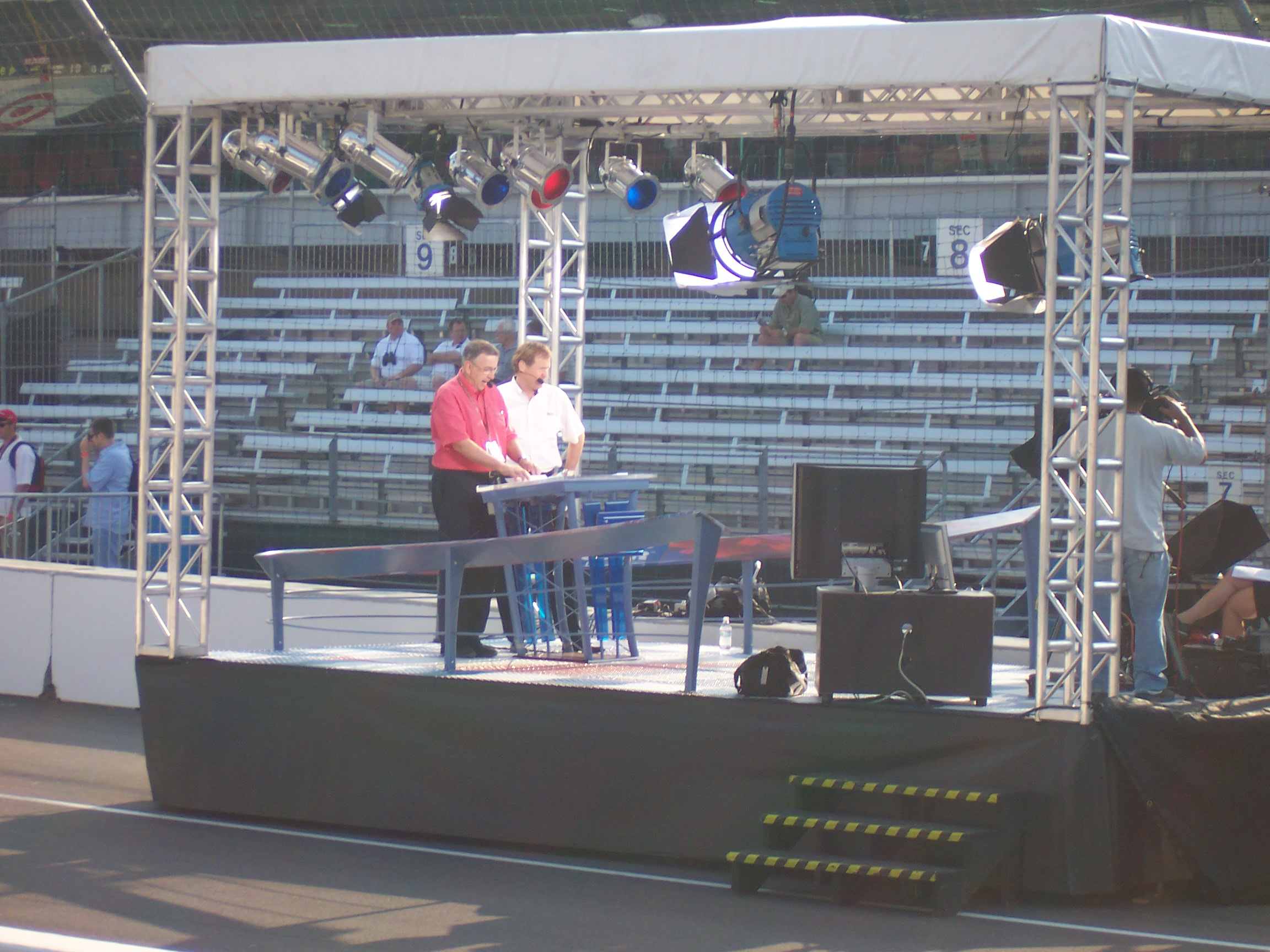
Brent Musburger and Rusty Wallace prepare to report from the ABC-TV pre-race stage at the 2006 Indianapolis 500.

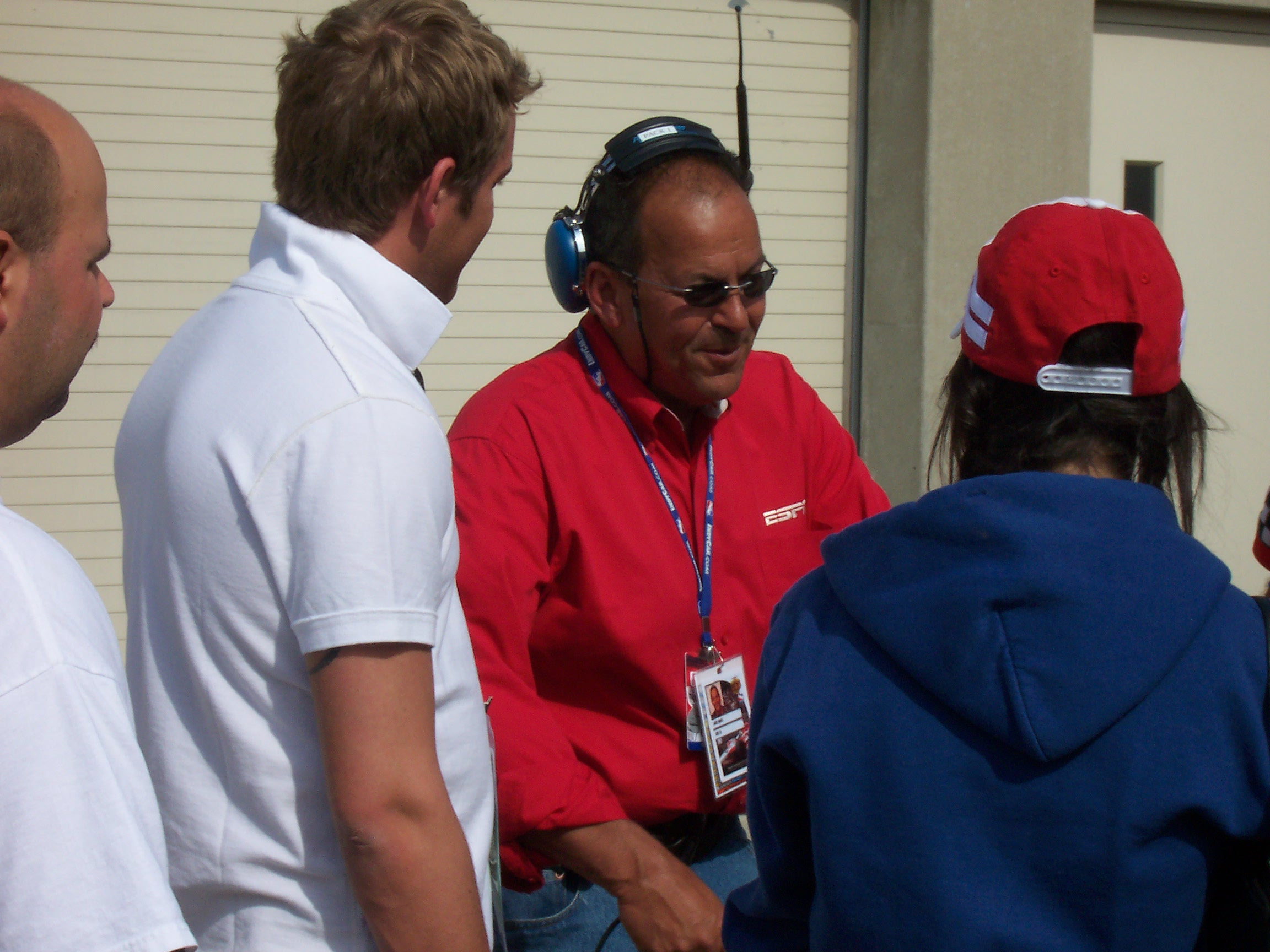
Jack Arute of ABC Sports in the garage area at the 2006 Indianapolis 500.

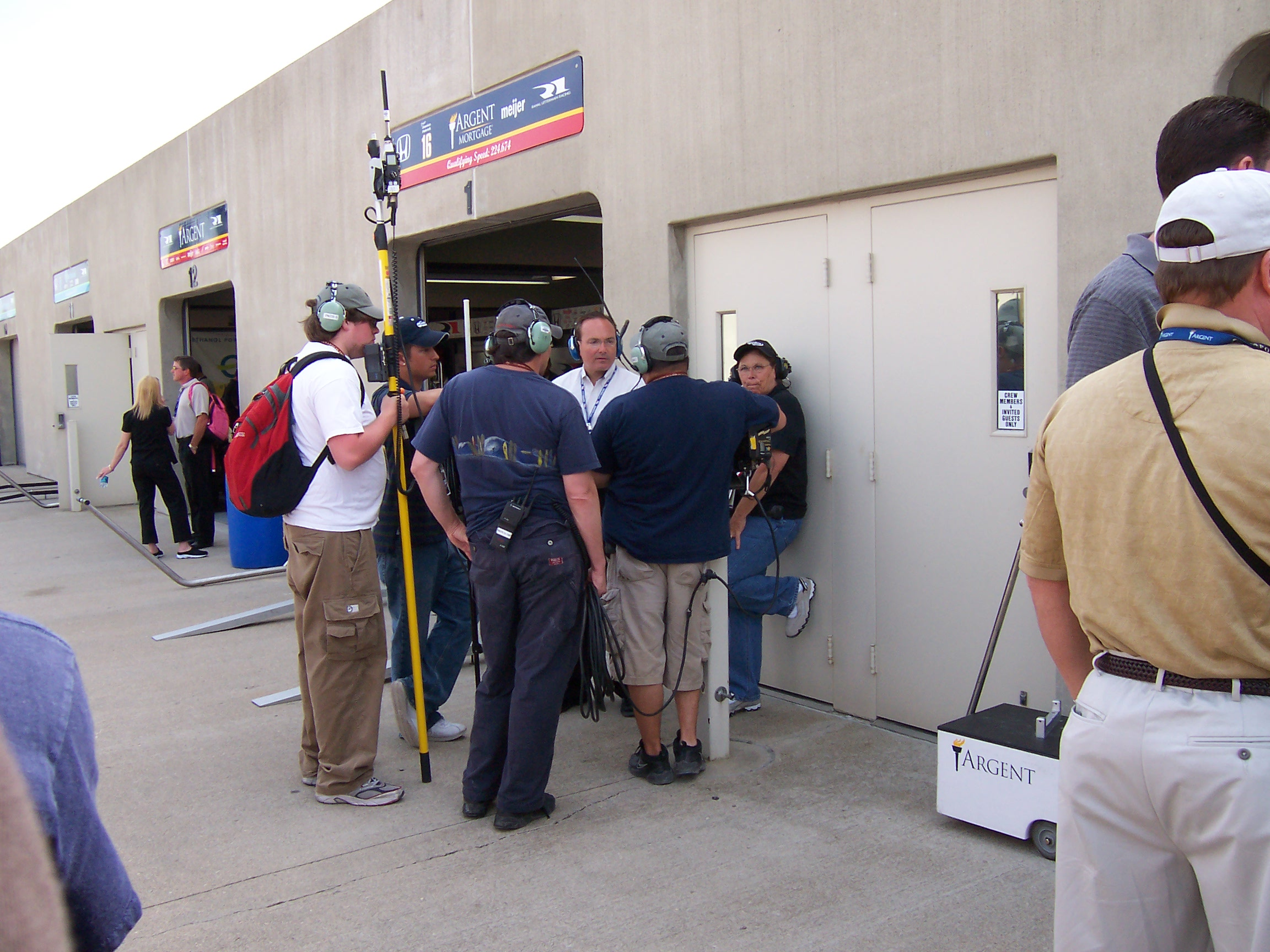
Dr. Jerry Punch of ABC Sports in the garage area at the 2006 Indianapolis 500.

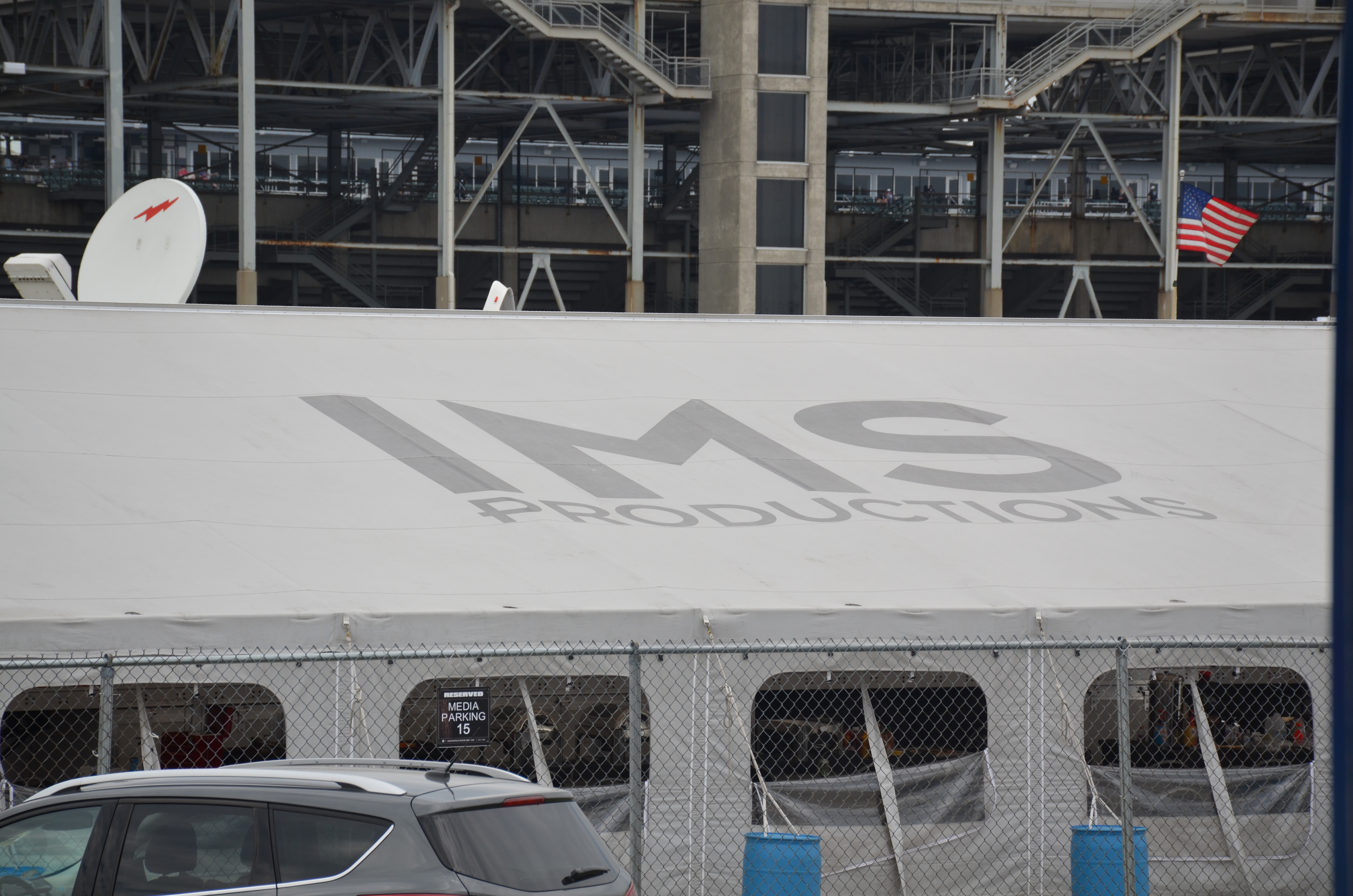
IMS Productions / ABC-TV broadcasting compound at the 2016 Indianapolis 500.

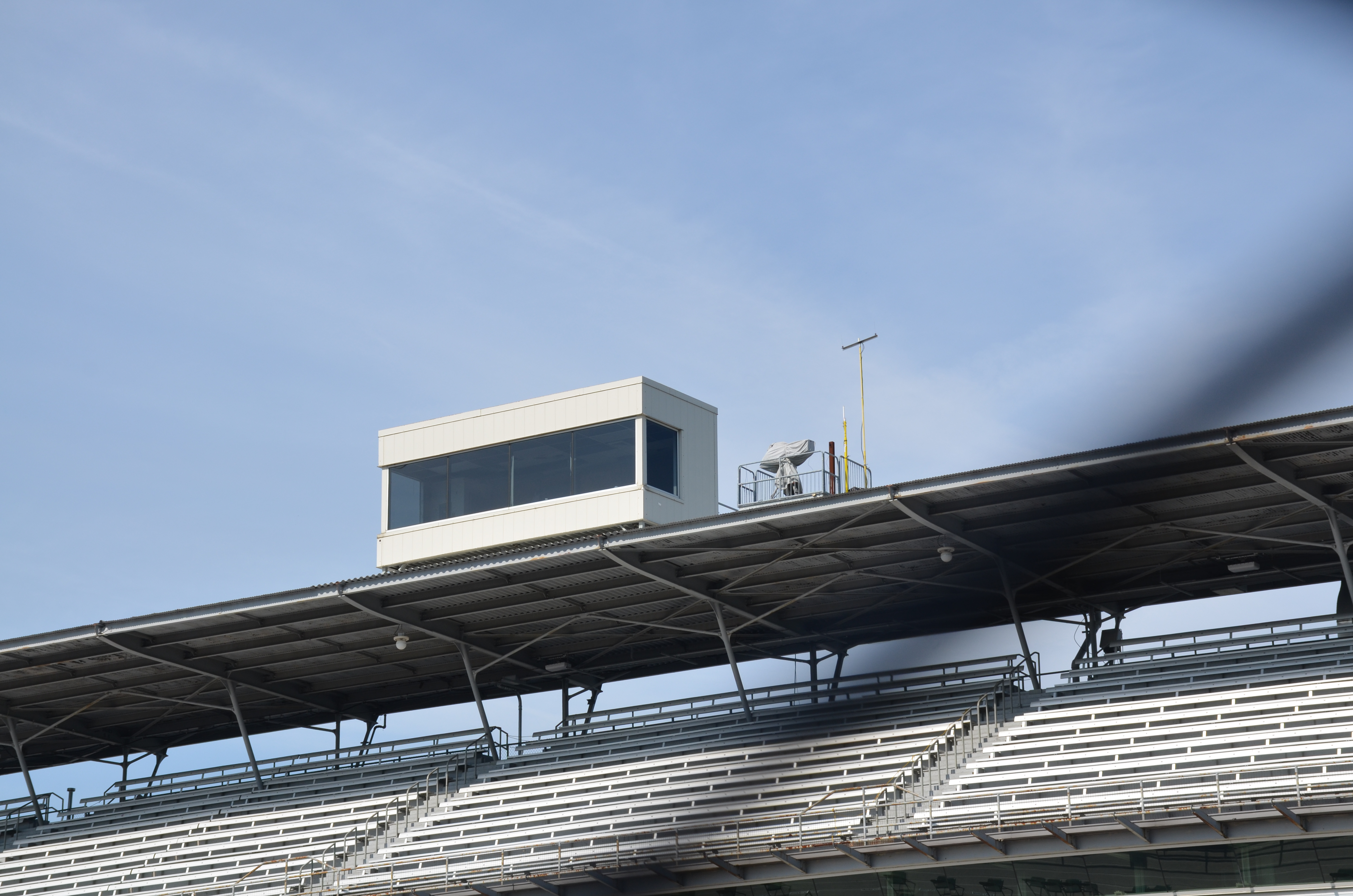
ABC television booth at the Indianapolis Motor Speedway. This booth was used by the ABC commentators from 1987 to 2003, and was later demolished after the 2015 race.

Year	Network	Host	Lap-by-lap announcer	Color commentator	Pit reporters
2018	ABC	Nicole Briscoe	Allen Bestwick	Scott Goodyear; Eddie Cheever	Jerry Punch; Jon Beekhuis; Rick DeBruhl; Marty Smith
2017	ABC	Lindsay Czarniak	Allen Bestwick	Scott Goodyear; Eddie Cheever	Jerry Punch; Jon Beekhuis; Rick DeBruhl; Marty Smith
2016	ABC	Lindsay Czarniak	Allen Bestwick	Scott Goodyear; Eddie Cheever	Jerry Punch; Jon Beekhuis; Rick DeBruhl; Marty Smith
2015	ABC	Lindsay Czarniak	Allen Bestwick	Scott Goodyear; Eddie Cheever	Jerry Punch; Jon Beekhuis; Rick DeBruhl
2014	ABC	Lindsay Czarniak	Allen Bestwick	Scott Goodyear; Eddie Cheever	Jerry Punch; Vince Welch; Jamie Little; Rick DeBruhl
2013	ABC	Lindsay Czarniak	Marty Reid	Scott Goodyear; Eddie Cheever	Jerry Punch; Vince Welch; Jamie Little; Rick DeBruhl
2012	ABC	Brent Musburger	Marty Reid	Scott Goodyear; Eddie Cheever	Jerry Punch; Vince Welch; Jamie Little; Rick DeBruhl
2011	ABC	Brent Musburger	Marty Reid	Scott Goodyear; Eddie Cheever	Jerry Punch; Vince Welch; Jamie Little; Rick DeBruhl
2010	ABC	Brent Musburger	Marty Reid	Scott Goodyear; Eddie Cheever	Jerry Punch; Vince Welch; Jamie Little; Rick DeBruhl
2009	ABC	Brent Musburger	Marty Reid	Scott Goodyear; Eddie Cheever	Jack Arute; Vince Welch; Brienne Pedigo; Jamie Little
2008	ABC	Brent Musburger	Marty Reid	Scott Goodyear; Eddie Cheever	Jack Arute; Vince Welch; Brienne Pedigo; Jamie Little
2007	ABC	Brent Musburger	Marty Reid	Scott Goodyear; Rusty Wallace	Jack Arute; Vince Welch; Brienne Pedigo; Jamie Little
2006	ABC	Brent Musburger	Marty Reid	Scott Goodyear; Rusty Wallace	Jack Arute; Jerry Punch; Vince Welch; Jamie Little
2005	ABC	Brent Musburger	Todd Harris	Scott Goodyear	Jack Arute; Jerry Punch; Vince Welch; Jamie Little
2004	ABC	Terry Gannon	Paul Page	Scott Goodyear; Jack Arute	Jerry Punch; Gary Gerould; Vince Welch; Todd Harris; Jamie Little
2003	ABC	Bob Jenkins	Paul Page	Scott Goodyear	Jack Arute; Jerry Punch; Gary Gerould; Vince Welch
2002	ABC	Bob Jenkins	Paul Page	Scott Goodyear	Jack Arute; Jerry Punch; Gary Gerould; Vince Welch
2001	ABC	Al Michaels	Bob Jenkins	Larry Rice; Jason Priestley	Jack Arute; Jerry Punch; Vince Welch; Leslie Gudel
2000	ABC	Al Michaels	Bob Jenkins	Tom Sneva; Arie Luyendyk	Jack Arute; Jerry Punch; Vince Welch; Leslie Gudel
1999	ABC	Al Michaels	Bob Jenkins	Tom Sneva	Jerry Punch; Gary Gerould; Jon Beekhuis
1998	ABC	Paul Page	Paul Page	Tom Sneva	Jack Arute; Jerry Punch; Gary Gerould
1997	ABC	Paul Page	Paul Page	Danny Sullivan (turn four); Bobby Unser (turn two); Tom Sneva	Jack Arute; Jerry Punch; Gary Gerould
1996	ABC	Paul Page	Paul Page	Danny Sullivan; Bobby Unser (turn two)	Jack Arute; Jerry Punch; Gary Gerould
1995	ABC	Paul Page	Paul Page	Bobby Unser (turn two); Sam Posey	Jack Arute; Jerry Punch; Gary Gerould
1994	ABC	Paul Page	Paul Page	Danny Sullivan (turn four); Bobby Unser (turn two); Sam Posey	Jack Arute; Jerry Punch; Gary Gerould
1993	ABC	Paul Page	Paul Page	Bobby Unser (turn two); Sam Posey	Jack Arute; Jerry Punch; Gary Gerould
1992	ABC	Paul Page	Paul Page	Bobby Unser; Sam Posey	Jack Arute; Jerry Punch; Gary Gerould
1991	ABC	Paul Page	Paul Page	Bobby Unser; Sam Posey	Jack Arute; Jerry Punch; Gary Gerould
1990	ABC	Paul Page	Paul Page	Bobby Unser; Sam Posey	Jack Arute; Jerry Punch; Gary Gerould
1989	ABC	Paul Page	Paul Page	Bobby Unser; Sam Posey	Jack Arute; Jerry Punch; Brian Hammons
1988	ABC	Paul Page	Paul Page	Bobby Unser; Sam Posey	Jack Arute; Brian Hammons
1987	ABC	Jim McKay	Jim Lampley	Bobby Unser; Sam Posey	Jack Arute; Al Trautwig; Jerry Gappens
1986	ABC	Jim McKay	Jim Lampley	Sam Posey	Jack Arute; Al Trautwig; Larry Nuber; Donna de Varona

- Starting in 1986, the race was shown live in its entirety. The 1986 race, however, was postponed for six days due to rain.
- From 2007 to 2018, live coverage was produced by ESPN. Also in 2007, Rusty Wallace and Jamie Little worked the 500, but did not cover any other races that season.
- Rupert Boneham once worked as part of the ABC Sports production crew at Indy.

=== ABC-TV live telecast gallery ===
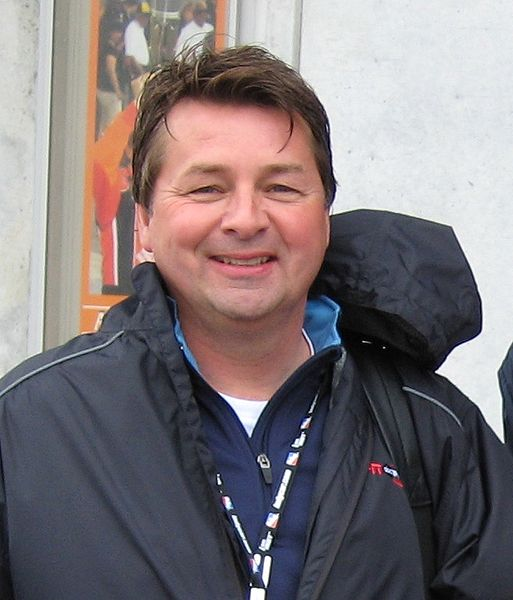
Scott Goodyear

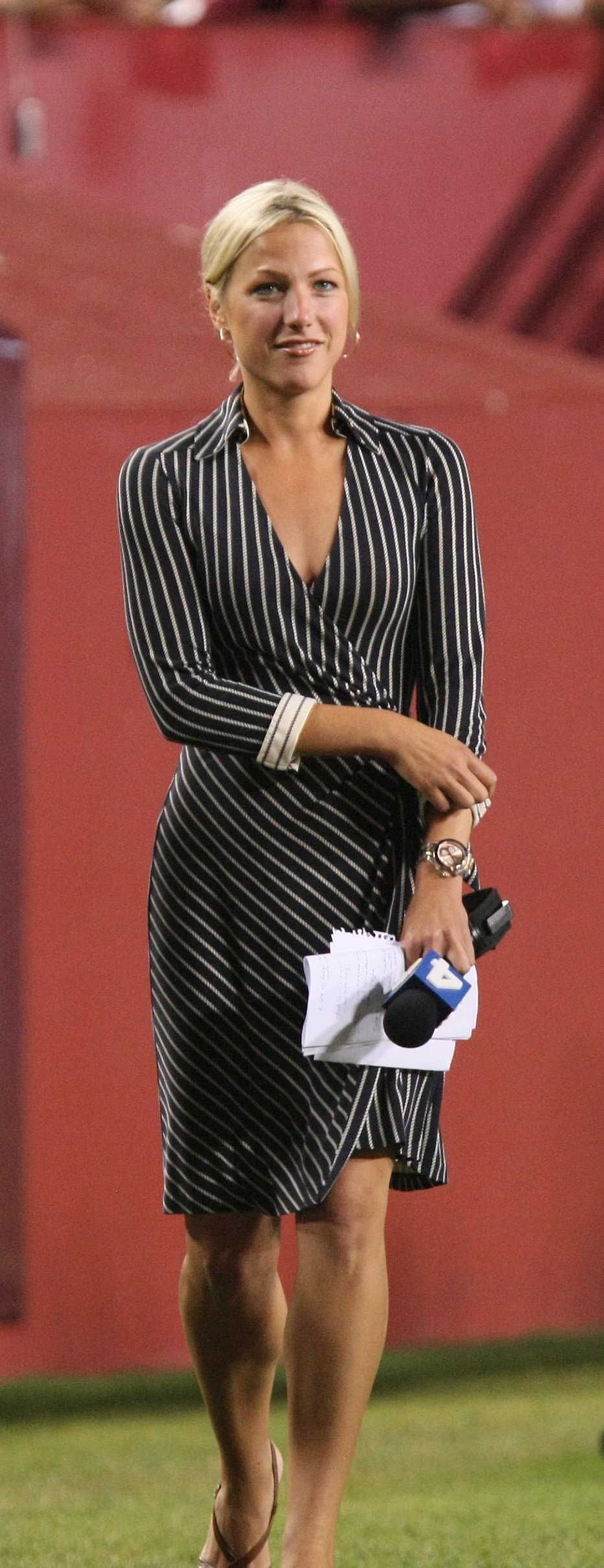
Lindsay Czarniak

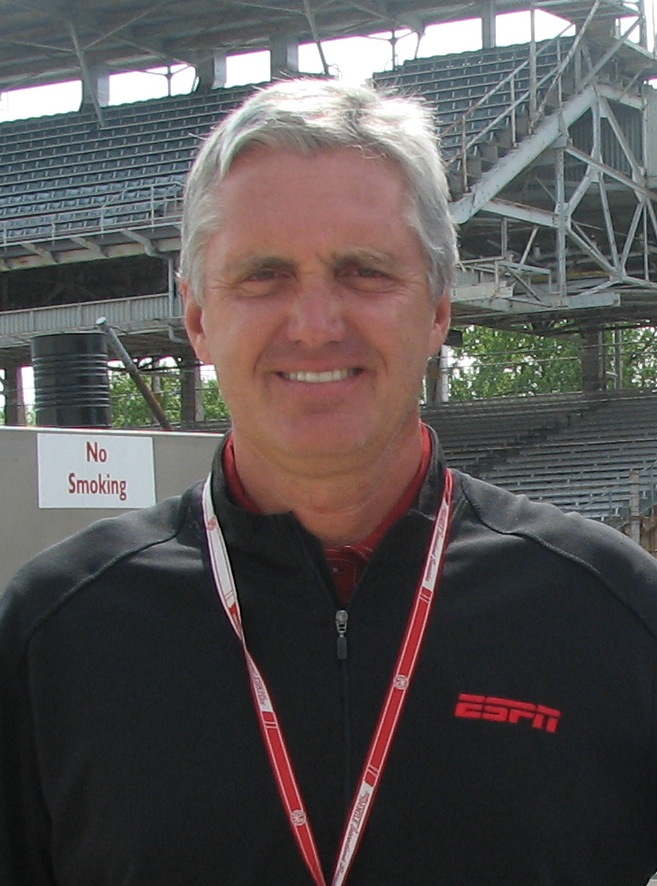
Eddie Cheever

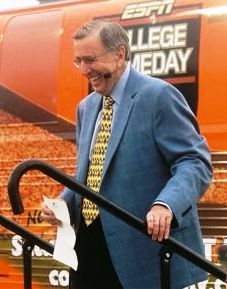
Brent Musburger

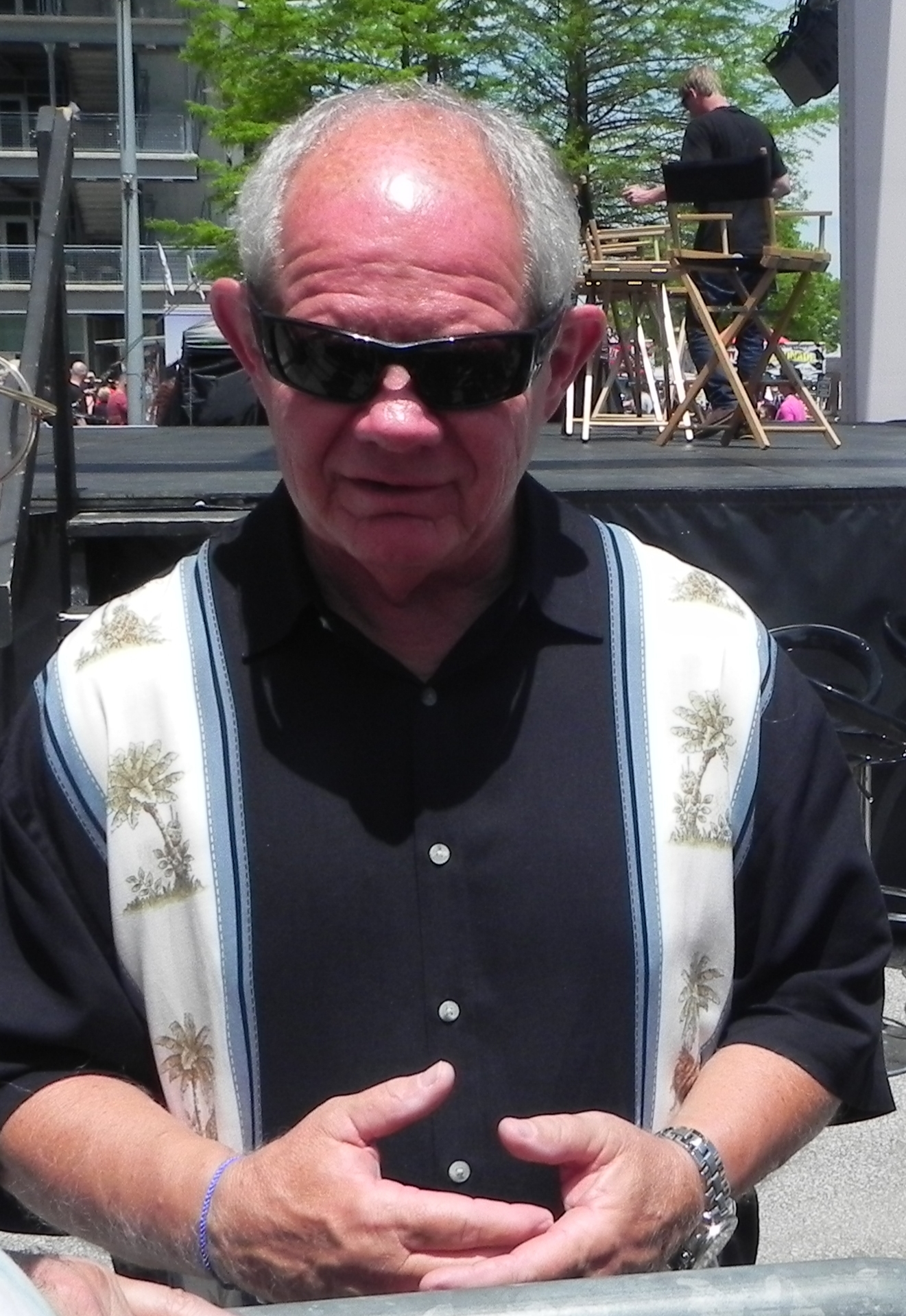
Paul Page

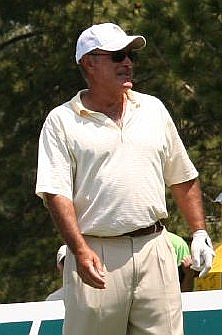
Al Michaels

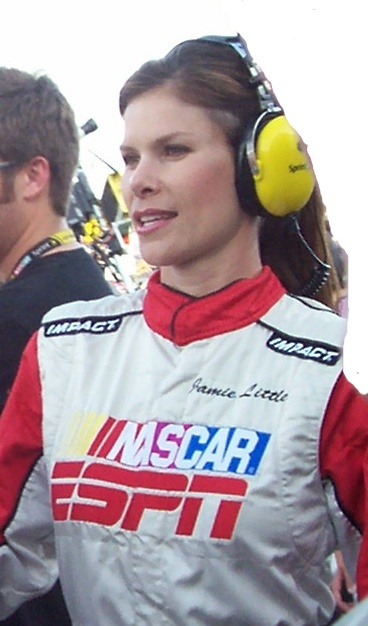
Jamie Little

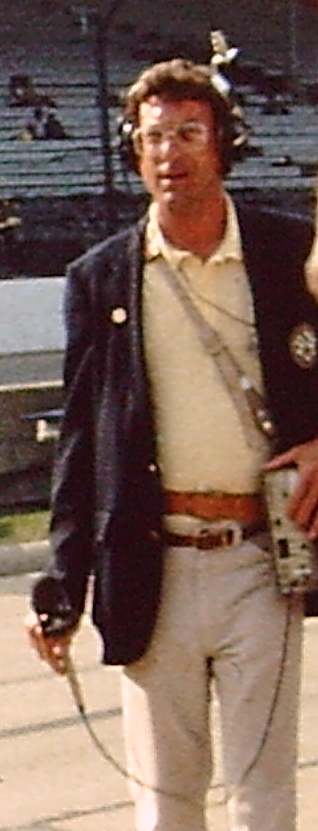
Bob Jenkins

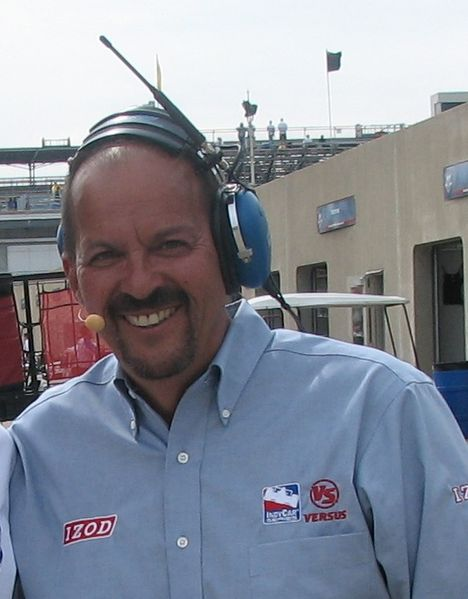
Jack Arute

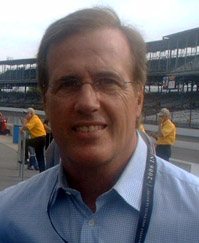
Danny Sullivan

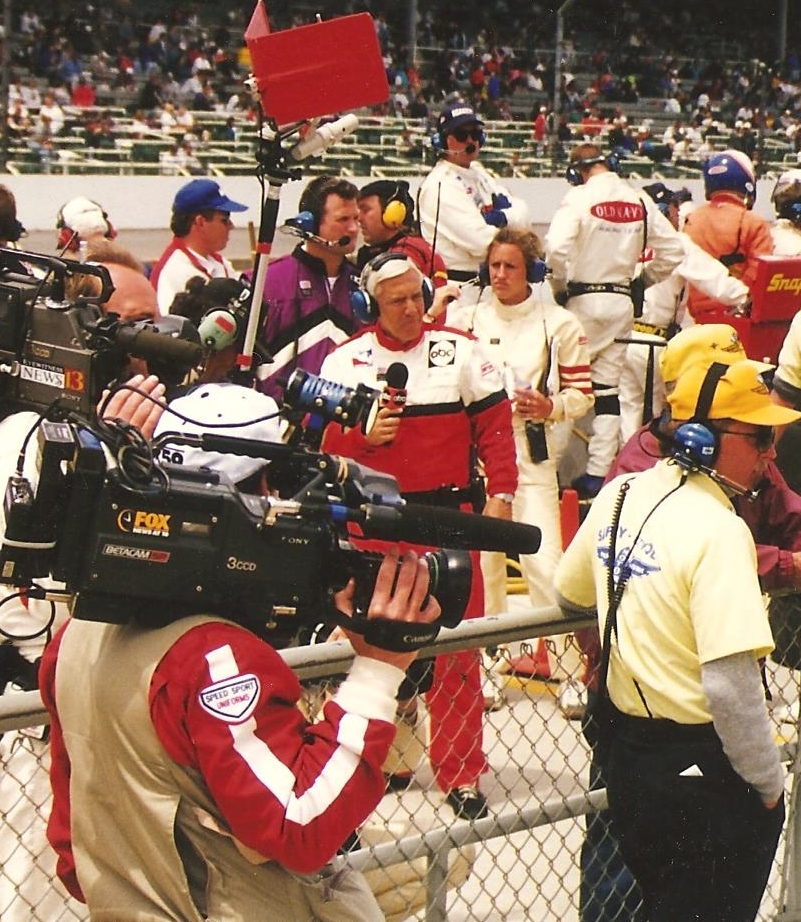
Gary Gerould

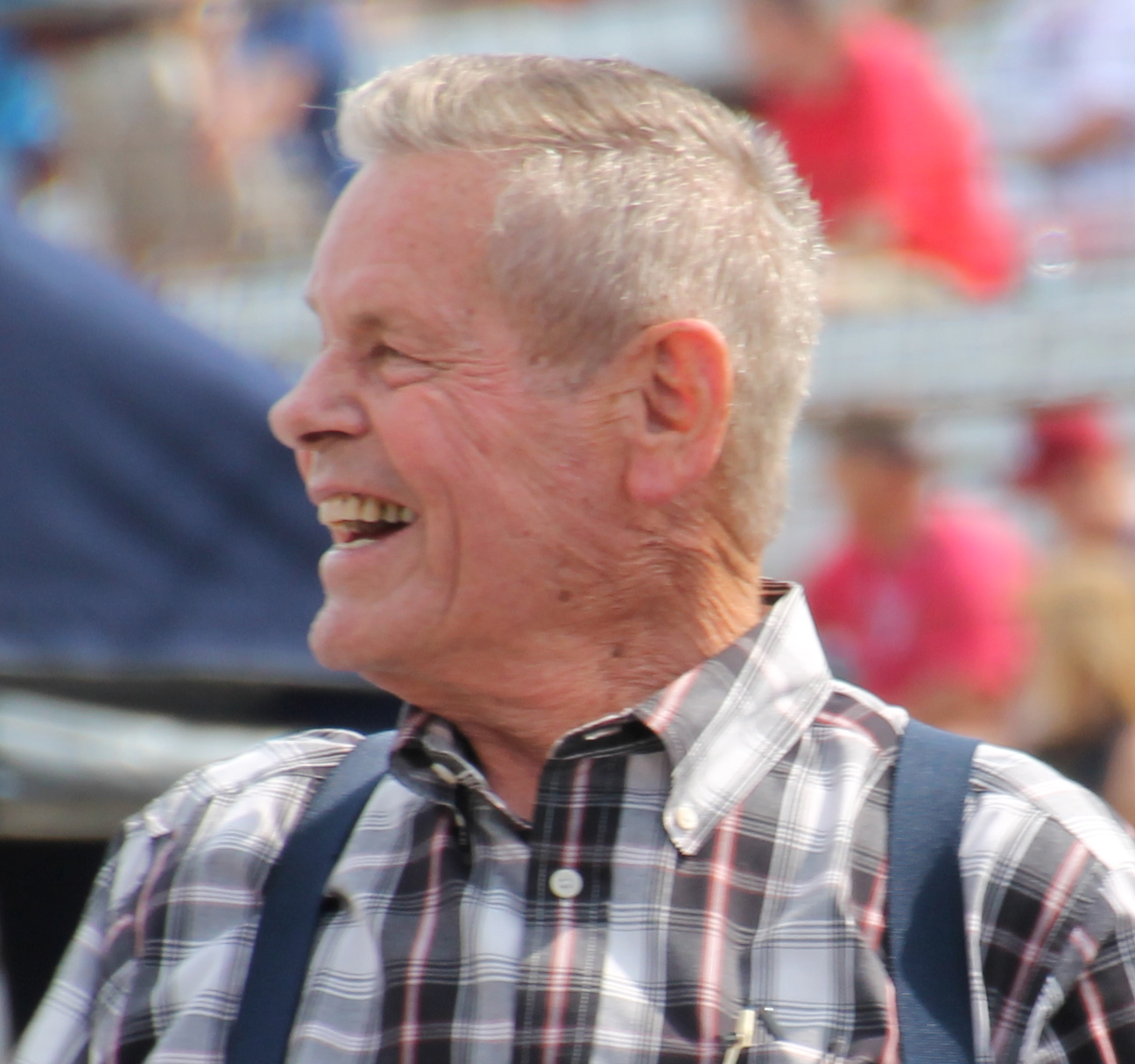
Bobby Unser

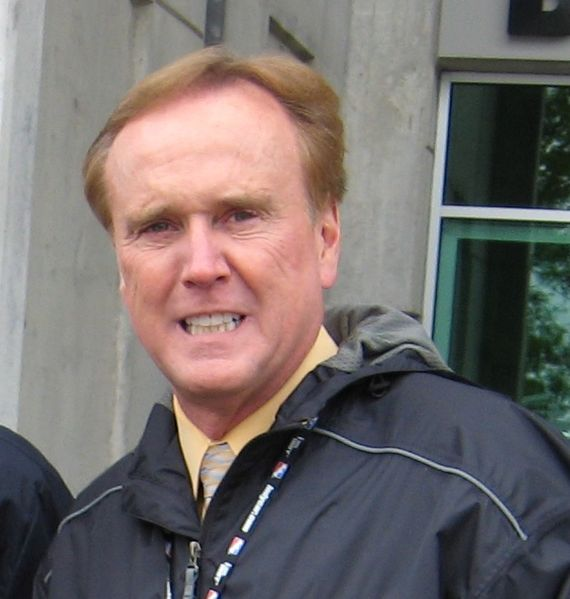
Marty Reid

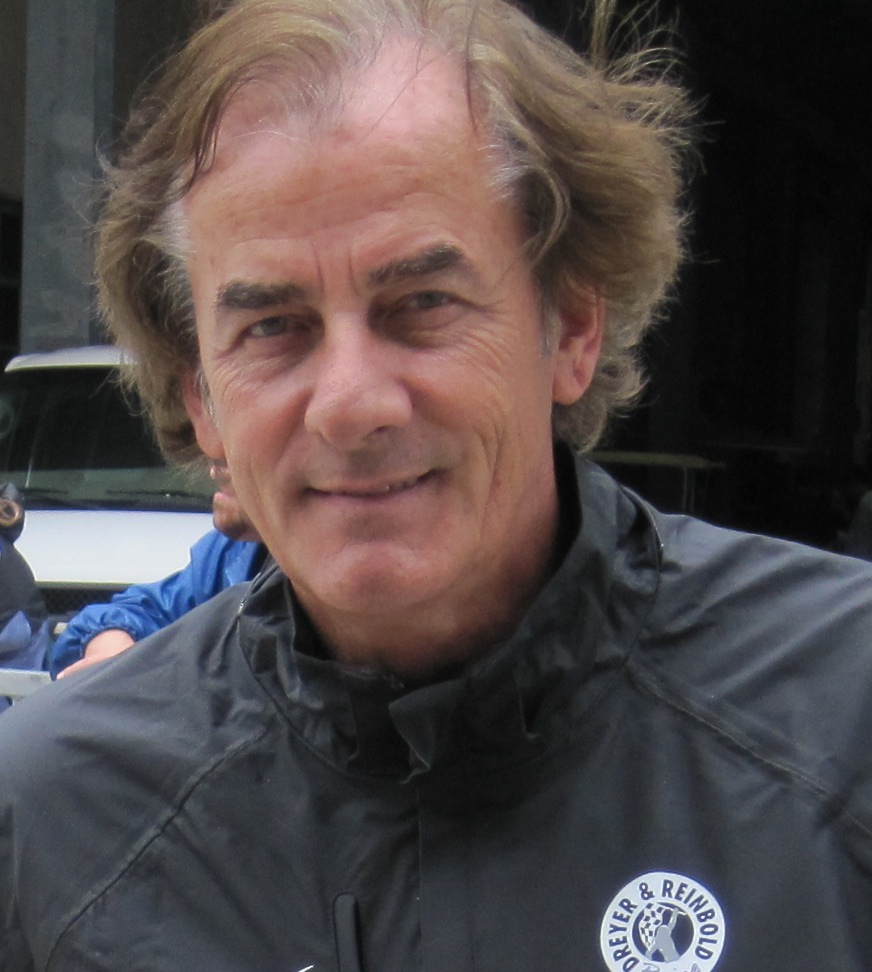
Arie Luyendyk

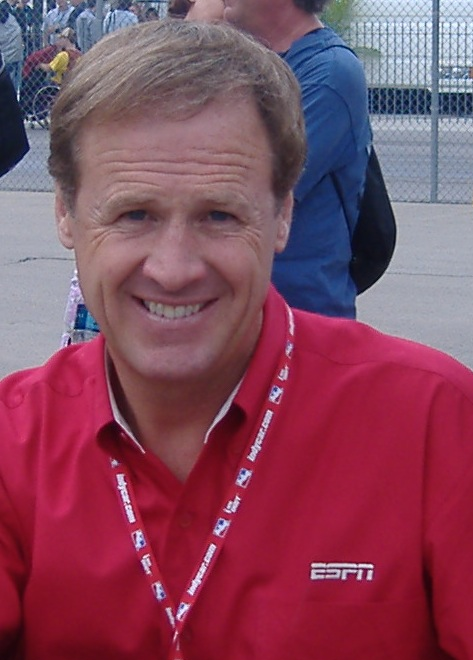
Rusty Wallace

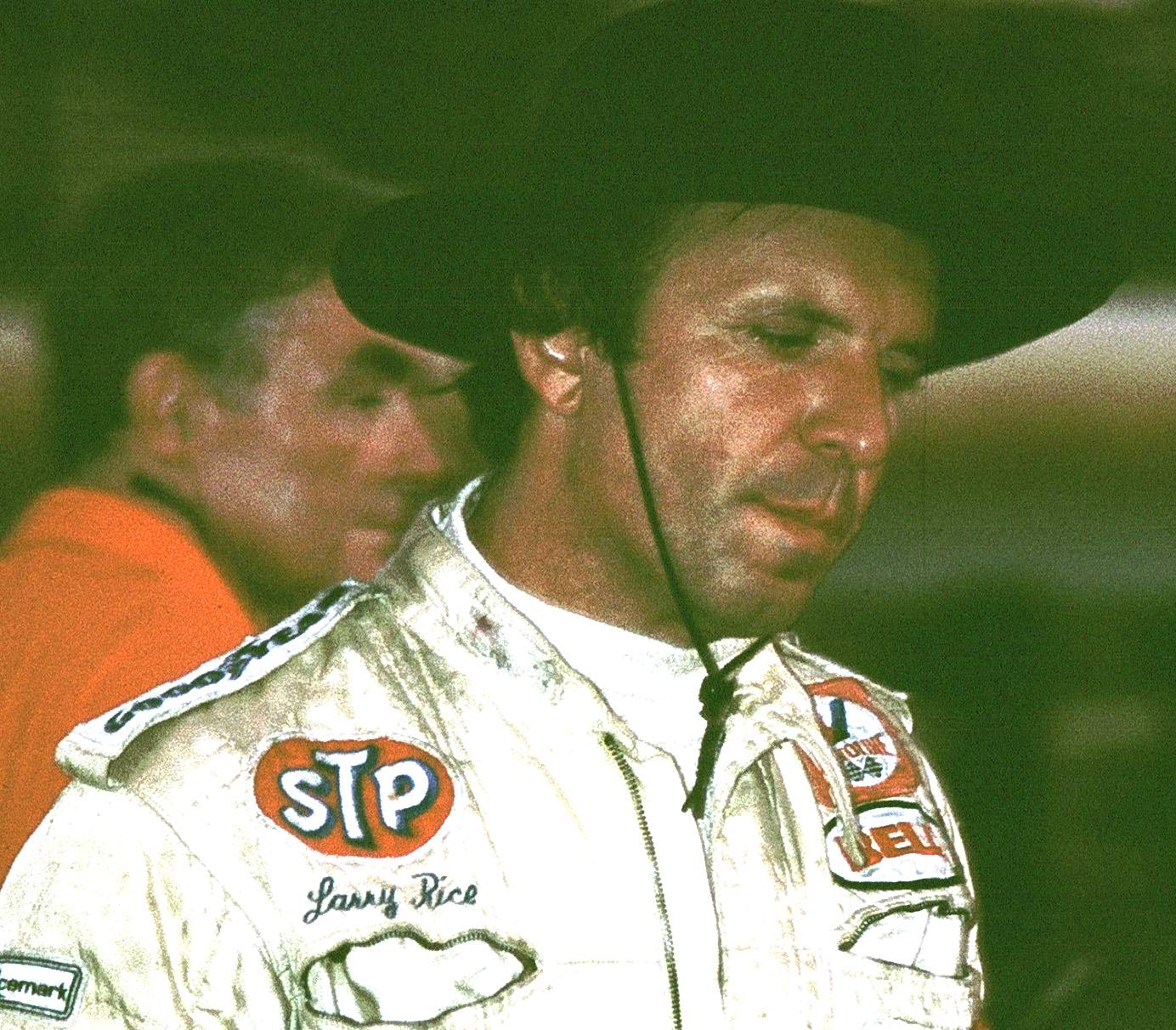
Larry Rice

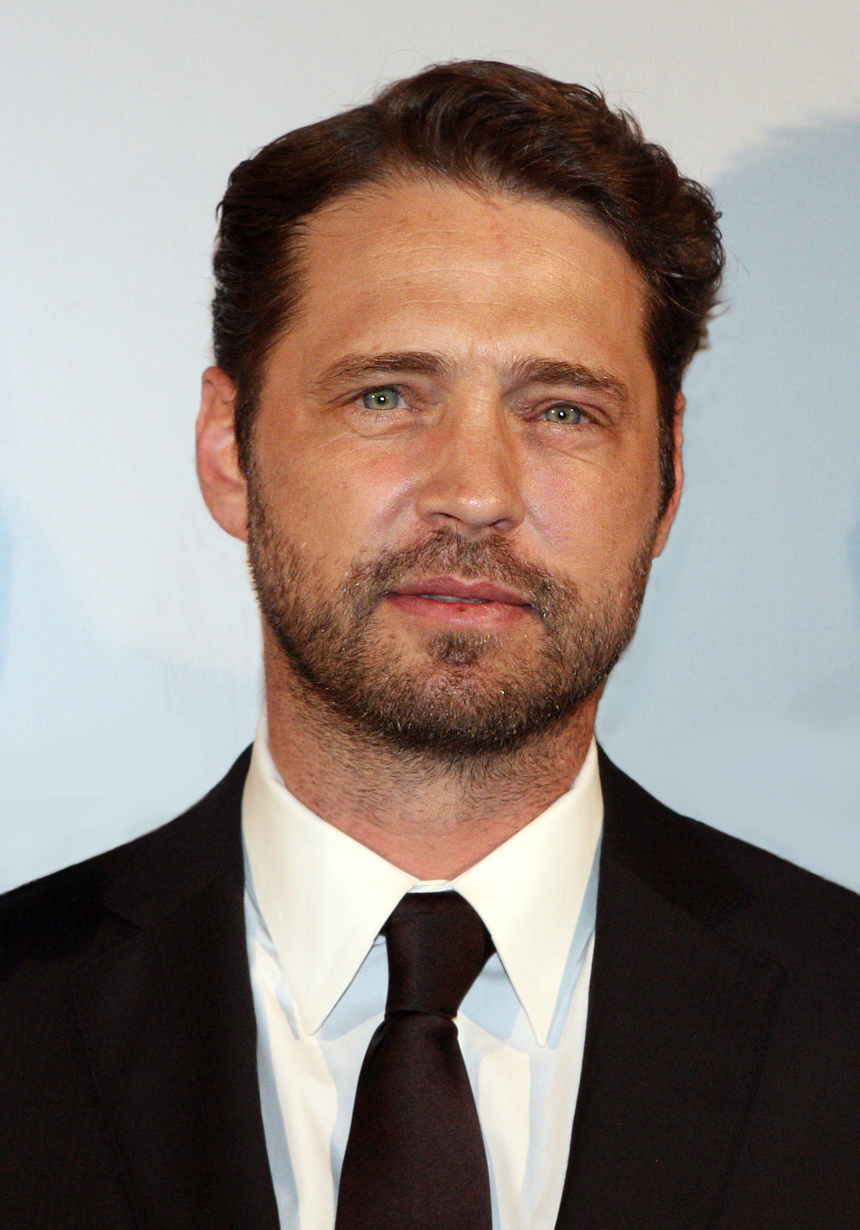
Jason Priestley

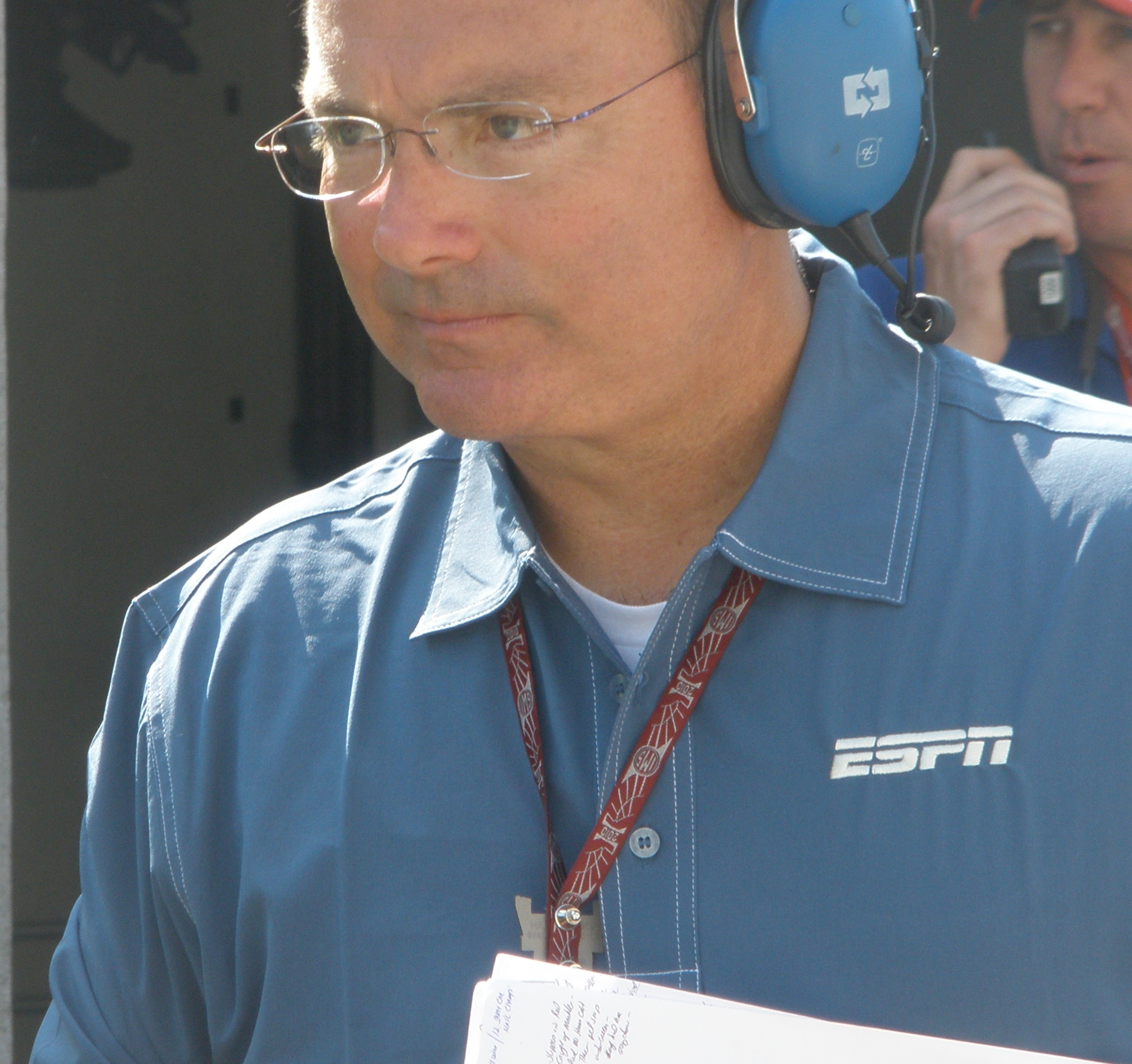
Jerry Punch

== Same-day tape delay coverage ==
From 1971 to 1985, the Indianapolis 500 was shown on a same-day tape delay basis. Races were edited down to a between two and three hour broadcast, and shown in prime time. It was also blacked out in the Indianapolis market until a later date. The broadcasts would typically open with the rendition of "Back Home Again in Indiana", and the starting command, but no other pre-race ceremonies. In addition, the broadcast was supplemented with some pre-recorded, in-depth featurettes, aired during down times. Later telecasts included live introductions at the top and bottom of the broadcast, with the closing segment sometimes an interview with the race winner, which by that time, had been revealed to the viewers. During this period, the announcers' commentary at both the start and finish of the race were recorded as those events transpired. However, the commentary of the middle parts of the race was semi-scripted, and recorded in post-production, and edited into the broadcast as it was being aired.

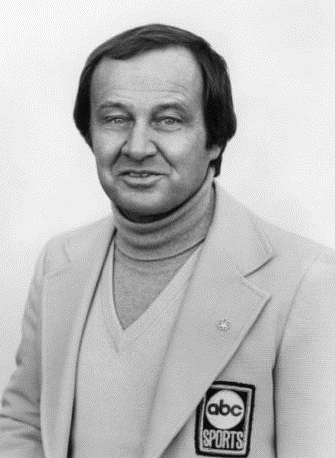
Jim McKay

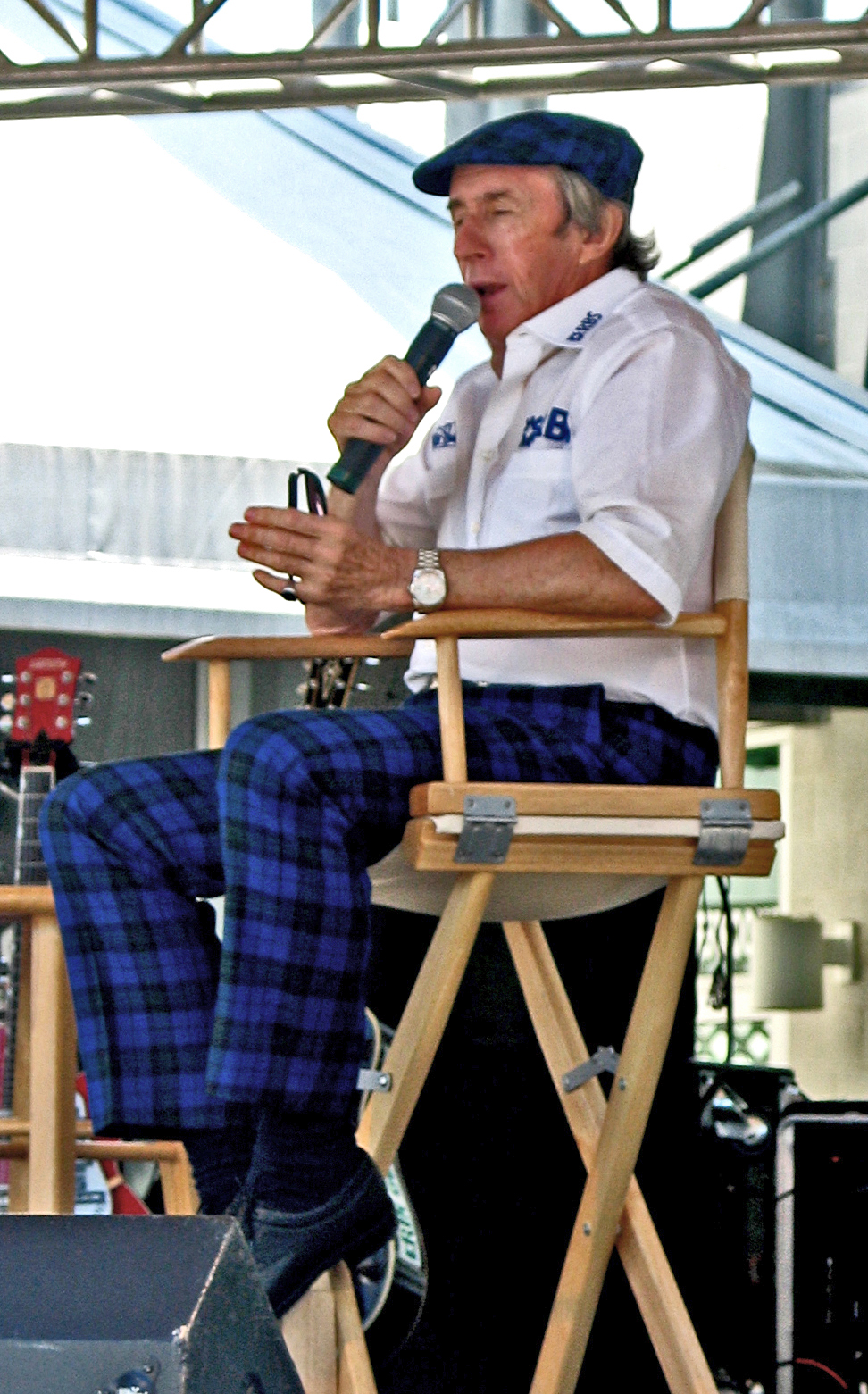
Jackie Stewart

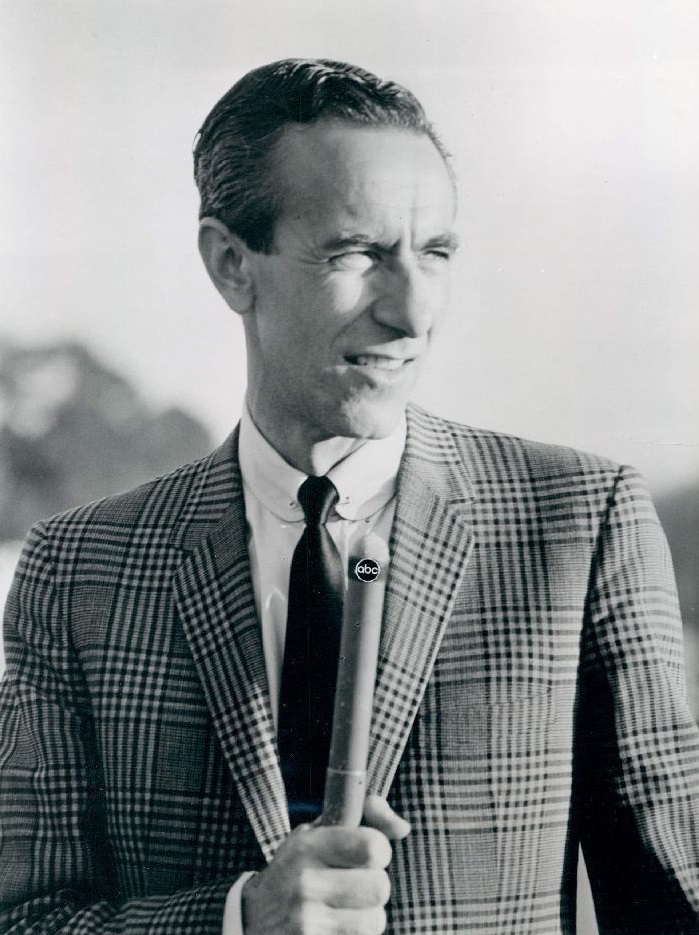
Chris Schenkel

Year	Network	Host	Lap-by-lap announcer	Color commentators	Pit reporters
1985	ABC	Jim McKay	Jim McKay	Sam Posey	Jack Arute; Jim Lampley; Bill Flemming
1984	ABC	Jackie Stewart	Jim McKay	Sam Posey	Jack Arute; Larry Nuber; Bill Flemming; Ray Gandolf
1983	ABC	Jackie Stewart	Jim McKay	Sam Posey	Chris Economaki; Bill Flemming; Jim Lampley; Anne Simon
1982	ABC	Jackie Stewart	Jim McKay	Sam Posey	Chris Economaki; Bill Flemming; Jack Whitaker; Clyde Lee
1981	ABC	Dave Diles	Jim McKay	Jackie Stewart	Chris Economaki; Bill Flemming; Sam Posey
1980	ABC	Chris Schenkel; Dave Diles	Jim McKay	Jackie Stewart	Chris Economaki; Sam Posey
1979	ABC	Chris Schenkel	Jim McKay	Jackie Stewart	Chris Economaki; Dave Diles
1978	ABC	Chris Schenkel	Jim McKay	Jackie Stewart	Chris Economaki; Bill Flemming; Sam Posey
1977	ABC	Chris Schenkel	Jim McKay	Jackie Stewart	Chris Economaki; Bill Flemming
1976	ABC	Chris Schenkel	Jim McKay	Sam Posey	Chris Economaki; Bill Flemming; Jackie Stewart (Features)
1975	ABC	Chris Schenkel	Keith Jackson	Jackie Stewart	Chris Economaki; Sam Posey
1974	ABC	Chris Schenkel	Jim McKay	Sam Posey	Chris Economaki; Bill Flemming; Jackie Stewart (Features)
1973	ABC	Chris Schenkel	Jim McKay	Jackie Stewart; Chris Economaki*	Dave Diles; Don Hein
1972	ABC	Chris Schenkel	Jim McKay	Jackie Stewart	Chris Economaki
1971	ABC	Chris Schenkel	Jim McKay	Jackie Stewart	Chris Economaki; Bill Flemming; Keith Jackson; David Letterman

- In 1973, Jackie Stewart was scheduled to be the color commentator. The race however, was red flagged on Monday due to the Salt Walther crash, and rain delayed the start until Wednesday. Stewart was unable to stay for the race running on Wednesday since he was due to compete the following weekend as a driver in the Grand Prix of Monaco, so Chris Economaki took his place.
- In 1974 and 1976, Sam Posey provided the color commentary in place of Jackie Stewart due to the Indy 500 and Monaco Grand Prix clashing on the same weekend. Stewart did pre recorded features at Indy during qualifying week which were aired on race day before going to Monaco to cover the grand prix for ABC.
- In 1971 Chris Schenkel was supposed to be the telecast host, but was injured when the pace car crashed coming into the pits at the start of the race.
- In 1971, a young David Letterman, who then worked at ABC's then-Indianapolis affiliate WLWI-TV, was one of the roving turn reporters.

== Wide World of Sports & closed-circuit coverage ==
Race commentary for ABC's Wide World of Sports broadcasts was recorded during post-production. During the actual running of the race, anchor Jim McKay occasionally served as a roving reporter, recording interviews in the pits and garage area, which was later edited into the broadcast. In some years the broadcast also included highlights of time trials. From 1964 to 1970, the Indianapolis 500 was shown live on closed-circuit television in theaters and other similar venues across the United States. All live closed circuit broadcasts were anchored by Charlie Brockman.

Wide World of Sports
Year	Network	Lap-by-lap announcer	Color commentator	Pit reporters
1970	ABC	Jim McKay	Rodger Ward	Chris Economaki
1969	ABC	Jim McKay	Rodger Ward	Chris Economaki
1968	ABC	Jim McKay	Rodger Ward	Chris Economaki
1967	ABC	Jim McKay	Rodger Ward	Chris Economaki
1966	ABC	Chris Schenkel	not used	
1965	ABC	Charlie Brockman	Rodger Ward	

Closed Circuit television
Year	Network	Lap-by-lap announcer	Color commentator	Pit reporters
1970	MCA	Charlie Brockman	Rodger Ward; Jackie Stewart	
1969	MCA	Charlie Brockman	Rodger Ward	Jim Wilson
1968	MCA	Charlie Brockman	Rodger Ward	Chris Economaki; Parnelli Jones
1967	MCA	Charlie Brockman	Rodger Ward; Chick Hearn	Chris Economaki; Sam Hanks
1966	MCA	Charlie Brockman	Sam Hanks	Chris Economaki
1965	MCA	Charlie Brockman	Rodger Ward; Sam Hanks; Bernie Herman	Chris Economaki
1964	MCA	Charlie Brockman	Sam Hanks; Bernie Herman	Chris Economaki; Darl Wible

== Local live coverage ==
The Indianapolis 500 was first broadcast on television from 1949 to 1950 on WFBM (now WRTV) in Indianapolis. It was done to boost sales of television sets. At the time, there was consideration for the race to be broadcast nationally by 1951 or 1952, possibly through a network syndication arrangement originating through WFBM. After two years, however, the Speedway management decided to eliminate live television coverage, fearful that live local television coverage would hurt gate attendance. Likewise, the cost to expand the broadcast nationally was considered prohibitive. For 1951, WFBM-TV was permitted to televise time trials live, but not the race itself. In future years, local live coverage of time trials would continue in various forms, but the race itself was to be blacked out in the Indianapolis area. Only thrice (2016, 2021, and 2024) would the local blackout be lifted on race day.

Year	Network	host	Lap-by-lap announcer	Color commentators	Pit reporters
1950	WFBM	Earl Townsend	Earl Townsend	Dick Pittenger	Paul Roberts
1949	WFBM	Earl Townsend	Earl Townsend	Dick Pittenger; Paul Roberts	Robert Robbins

== Time trials and practice ==
ABC carried highlights of time trials for the first time in 1961. ABC continued to cover time trials exclusively through the 1970s and early 1980s. In 1987 ESPN began covering portions of time trials. From 1987 to 2008, time trials was aired over a combination of ABC, ESPN, and ESPN2, in varying levels of air time. From 2009 to 2013, time trials was aired on Versus/NBCSN. Time trials returned to ABC in 2014–2018. NBC, NBCSN, and Peacock aired time trials from 2019 to 2024. Time trials began airing on Fox, FS1, and FS2 in 2025.

In 1993, ESPN began covering daily practice session, with a wrap-up show each afternoon. The "Indy Live Daily Reports" continued through 2006, and in some years were packaged as part of RPM 2Night or SportsCenter. From 2009 to 2021, Carb Day aired on Versus/NBCSN. Carb Day began airing on FS1 in 2025. Live streaming of practice began in 2001. Streaming providers have included: Indy500.com official site (2001, 2004), Yahoo! (2002–2003, 2006), WhiteBoxPC/NeuLion (2009), YouTube (2010–2018), NBC Sports Gold (2019–2020) and Peacock Premium (2021–2024).

== Footnotes ==
=== See also ===
- Indianapolis Motor Speedway Radio Network
- Indianapolis 500 in film and media

=== Works cited ===
- Daytona 500 Indy 500 Live
- Johnson's Indy 500 - Indy on TV
- Fang's Bites: The Indy 500 On ABC
- Indianapolis 500 numbers game.
- Record Low Ratings For Indianapolis 500
