= IndyCar Series on NBC =

- Genre: Auto racing telecasts
- Presented by: See commentators section below
- Country of origin: United States
- Original language: English

Production
- Producer: Terry Lingner
- Camera setup: Multi-camera
- Running time: Pre-race: 30 minutes Race: 2 to 5 hours (depending on race length) Post-race: 30 minutes
- Production company: NBC Sports IMS Productions

Original release
- Network: NBC (2019–2024); Versus/NBCSN (2009–2021); USA Network (2022–2024); Telemundo (2015–2024); Universo (2015–2024); NBC Sports Gold (2019–2021); Peacock (2022–2024)
- Release: April 5, 2009 – September 15, 2024

Related
- IndyCar Series on ABC; NASCAR on NBC; NASCAR on Fox

IndyCar Series on NBC is the blanket title used for telecasts of IndyCar Series racing produced by NBC Sports.

NBC Sports' most recent involvement with the IndyCar Series dates back to the 2009 season, when Comcast-owned sports network Versus acquired the cable rights to the IndyCar Series under a 10-year deal. Versus was merged into the NBC Sports division and renamed NBC Sports Network (NBCSN) in 2012 after Comcast acquired a controlling stake in NBC Universal.

In 2019, NBC Sports reached a three-year extension to its contract, which also saw NBC acquire the broadcast television rights to the IndyCar Series (replacing ABC). As a result, NBC gained the broadcast rights to the IndyCar Series' flagship event, the Indianapolis 500. NBC's contract expired after the 2024 season, and starting in 2025, Fox Sports acquired the television rights to the entirety of both the IndyCar Series and Indy NXT schedules.

== Overview ==
=== Background ===
==== Early years ====
When the CART Series was created in 1979, NBC broadcast the races as part of the sports anthology series Sportsworld. NBC soon became the exclusive broadcast partner of CART – although the series' most prestigious race, the Indianapolis 500 was sanctioned by USAC, and had a contract with ABC Sports. NBC carried races from 1979 to 1990, with the Michigan 500, Pocono 500, and Meadowlands their top events. Additionally, NBC televised a close father-son championship duel at Tamiami Park in 1985 between Al Unser and Al Unser Jr., with Big Al defeating Little Al by a single point.

Paul Page was the chief announcer, with Bobby Unser a frequent analyst before both made separate moves to ABC Sports in 1987.

==== Downturn ====
In the mid-1980s, CART began airing races on ABC and ESPN. The number of races NBC covered each season began to dwindle during the late portion of the decade. In addition, the broadcasts on NBC were more often tape-delayed and edited, while those on ABC and ESPN were usually live and "flag-to-flag". As the sport was growing in popularity, the organization naturally preferred the more desirable live telecasts.

By 1990, NBC carried only one race each year in July, the Meadowlands Grand Prix. After a three-year hiatus, the final season that NBC had aired a CART race was in 1994, with its coverage of the Toronto race. Jim Lampley (who called the Indy 500 on ABC in 1986-1987) was the anchor for the 1994 telecast.

NBC went away from auto racing after 1994, and did not air another major race until the 1999 Grand Prix of Sonoma for the American Le Mans Series.

==== Champ Car ====
In the early 2000s, NBC covered occasional American Le Mans Series races and secured a multi-year TV contract with NASCAR, but in 2005, NBC agreed to cover the Champ Car World Series (formerly CART) in Long Beach and Montreal, using Champ Car's new in-house broadcasting team of (at the time) Rick Benjamin, Derek Daly, Jon Beekhuis and Calvin Fish. These races were renewed in 2006, with the addition of San Jose. In 2007, NBC used Bill Weber and Wally Dallenbach Jr., both of whom still were contracted to the network despite NBC dropping their rights to NASCAR following the 2006 season, alongside permanent Champ Car driver analyst Jon Beekhuis, and added their own Marty Snider to the CCWS pitlane team of Michelle Beisner, Cameron Steele and Bill Stephens. With ESPN once again covering the bulk of the calendar, NBC only covered the first two races of the season, in Las Vegas and Long Beach.

==== Versus/NBCSN ====
On August 7, 2008, Versus announced a ten-year deal to broadcast at least 13 IndyCar Series events per-season, beginning with the 2009 season. ABC would continue to broadcast the Indianapolis 500, as well as four additional races. Through the deal, Versus began airing one-hour pre-race shows the day before a given race. The channel's parent company Comcast would acquire NBC Universal in 2011, and Versus was re-branded as NBC Sports Network (NBCSN) in 2012.

==== Expansion to NBC ====
On March 21, 2018, NBC Sports announced that it had agreed to a new, three-year extension of its contract beginning in the 2019 season, and also acquired the broadcast television rights to replace ABC. As before, NBCSN would continue airing the vast majority of the races, but eight races per-season would be televised by the main NBC network (an expansion over the previous ABC deal, where only five races were shown on broadcast television). The broadcast television package includes the Indianapolis 500, marking the race's move from ABC after 54 consecutive years. NBC Sports Gold also offered a subscription service with IndyCar-related content not broadcast on television. The content was later moved to NBCUniversal's streaming service Peacock Premium in 2021.

In July 2021, IndyCar announced a three-year extension of its contract with NBC Sports beginning in 2022; with NBCSN shutting down at the end of 2021, the broadcast television package would expand to at least 13 races per-season, and cable coverage would move to USA Network. Up to two races per-season would be exclusive to Peacock. The 2022 season would feature 14 races on NBC, and one race was carried exclusively by Peacock.

On June 13, 2024 IndyCar announced that the series will be moving to Fox Sports after six seasons on NBC.

===== Indianapolis 500 coverage =====
NBC televised the 2019 race in the United States, having assumed the broadcast rights as part of a new, three-year deal to televise the entire IndyCar Series, replacing ABC for the first time since 1965 (NBCSN held cable rights over the previous contract, but selected races, including the Indianapolis 500, were part of a separate package sold to ABC). The race was called by NBC's commentary team of Leigh Diffey, Townsend Bell, and Paul Tracy. Mike Tirico served as on-air host for pre-race coverage, joined by Danica Patrick and Dale Earnhardt Jr. as analysts. Dillon Welch, whose father was a former ESPN pit reporter for the Indianapolis 500, was also a reporter.

Portions of pre-race activities were exclusive to NBC Sports Gold's IndyCar Pass subscription, including most practice sessions and all of the first day of qualifying with the final hour simulcast by NBCSN along with the entirety of Carb Day also simulcast. Bump and Pole Day were exclusive to NBCSN; while NBC had a scheduled window, the session was delayed due to rain, and NBC had commitments to air an NHL playoff game. The season-long broadcast team of Jake Query, Anders Krohn, and Katie Hargitt covered the Indy Lights Freedom 100. NBCSN broadcast a two-hour pre-race show and a one-hour post-race show on race day.

The 2019 Indianapolis 500 saw an average of 5.4 million viewers, and a 3.9 overnight rating—a 15% increase over the 2018 edition (which was the least-viewed 500 since the introduction of live flag-to-flag coverage).

The 2020 race was televised on NBC in the United States; also, for the first time since 2016, the race was not blacked out in the Indianapolis area, airing live on WTHR (channel 13), as ticket sales ended four weeks prior to the race, and under regulations of the Speedway and Marion County Public Health Department's orders regarding capacity limits for events, announced two weeks before tickets were revoked under Marion County orders. On the original date of the race, NBC aired an encore of the 2019 edition of the race, Back Home Again, with Mike Tirico joined by Simon Pagenaud and Alexander Rossi (645,000 viewers)

On August 23, the live coverage on NBC was scheduled to begin at 1 p.m. eastern, following live coverage of The AIG Open Championship. The start of the race was moved from 12:45 p.m. to 2:30 p.m. During coverage of practice, time trials, and race day, driver analyst Paul Tracy moved out of the Pagoda and reported from the Turn Two Suites. This mimicked the position Bobby Unser utilized from 1993 to 1997. Tracy's position offered unique perspective, as well as promoted social distancing among the reporters.

Absent from the crew was Dale Earnhardt Jr., who drove the pace car and served as analyst in 2019. Earnhardt was instead covering the NASCAR Drydene Twin 500km that aired on NBCSN. Also absent was Robin Miller, who relinquished on-air duties due to battling bone cancer. Miller did contribute to the broadcasts, providing narration to pre-taped features during practice and time trials.

The Nielsen rating of 2.26 (3.699 million viewers) was an all-time low for the event.

The 2021 race was televised on NBC in the United States. The coverage began at 11:00 a.m. EDT. On May 28, it was announced that the race was not blacked out in the Indianapolis area for the fifth time in race history, airing live on WTHR (Channel 13), as all tickets had been sold out and reached 40 percent of venue capacity. This event hosted 135,000 fans on the circuit.

Mike Tirico and Danica Patrick returned for pre and post-race coverage, as they had done the previous two years. Patrick also drove the pace car during pre-race festivities. Jac Collinsworth made his Indy 500 debut as the Prerace Host on NBCSN. Dale Earnhardt Jr. returned for pre-race coverage after being absent for the 2020 event as a result of rescheduling (Earnhardt and Letarte were covering the Drydene Twin 500km at Dover International Speedway on the rescheduled weekend).

On May 4, Jimmie Johnson was announced as part of the broadcast team as part of the "Peacock Pit Box" crew alongside Steve Letarte.

The 2021 race was the final "500" for Robin Miller, who had covered the event for roughly fifty years at The Indianapolis Star, Racer, and on television through ESPN, Speed, and NBC. Miller died of leukemia on August 25, 2021.

The 2022 race was televised on NBC and Peacock Premium in the United States. The terrestrial television broadcast was subject to blackout in Central Indiana. The streaming broadcast on Peacock was not subject to blackout, as the platform does not currently have the ability to enforce such restrictions at a local level. NBC received special consent from IMS to stream the race within the blackout region for 2022 only, under the presumption that the required capabilities would be implemented prior to the 2023 race. This was only the sixth time in race history that the race was available to be seen live in the Central Indiana market.

Former driver James Hinchcliffe joined the NBC broadcast team for 2022 as a color commentator, replacing Paul Tracy, who had been in the role for the previous three years for the race.

On May 4, NBC announced their full crew for the race broadcast. Mike Tirico and Danica Patrick returned as the hosts for pre-race and post-race coverage, while Dale Earnhardt Jr. and Rutledge Wood returned for pre-race coverage. Tirico, Patrick, and Earnhardt were also announced as part of the "Peacock Pit Box" crew for mid-race coverage. Dillon Welch joined the crew as a pit reporter, replacing Kelli Stavast, who had been part of NBC's coverage since 2019.

The 2023 race was televised on NBC and Peacock Premium in the United States. Mike Tirico and Danica Patrick returned for pre-race and post-race coverage, as they had together since 2019. Leigh Diffey, Townsend Bell, and James Hinchcliffe were the booth announcers for the race. Two additional hours of pre-race coverage on race day was carried exclusively on Peacock.

On May 8, 2023, it was confirmed that, in line with longstanding policy that had been suspended during the COVID-19 pandemic, the live broadcast would be blacked-out in the Indianapolis area on both local television and Peacock, marking the first Indy 500 local blackout since the 2019 Indianapolis 500.

==== Loss of IndyCar rights ====
On June 13, 2024, it was announced that IndyCar agreed to a new media rights deal with Fox Sports starting in 2025, putting an end to IndyCar's relationship with NBC Sports.

NBC broadcast their final IndyCar event on September 15, 2024, during the 2024 Big Machine Music City Grand Prix at Nashville Superspeedway.

== Commentators ==
Bob Jenkins (who was signed as the chief announcer, and returned to IndyCar Racing full-time for the first time since 2001), Jon Beekhuis and Robbie Buhl were initially on the network's broadcast team, along with Jack Arute, Robbie Floyd and Lindy Thackston as pit reporters.

In August 2009, Indianapolis Star reporter Curt Cavin said that Arute would be leaving ESPN at the end of 2009 and join Versus full-time. He was fired from the network due to cost-cutting moves instituted by the network's new Comcast ownership following its merger with NBCUniversal. He was replaced by Kevin Lee, who is also a pit reporter for the Indianapolis Motor Speedway Network. Wally Dallenbach Jr. joined the Versus broadcast team following the merger, replacing Robbie Buhl.

Mike Tirico, Danica Patrick, and Dale Earnhardt Jr. have augmented NBC's broadcast team for the Indianapolis 500.

=== English-language commentators ===
==== Lap-by-lap anchors ====
- Leigh Diffey (2013–2024)
- Kevin Lee – reserve broadcaster (2015–2024) (fill-in)
- Omar Amador – lead Spanish-language broadcaster

==== Color commentators ====
- Townsend Bell (2013–2024)
- James Hinchcliffe (2020, 2022–2024)

==== Pit reporters ====
- Kevin Lee (2011–2024)
- Dillon Welch (2019–2024)
- Dave Burns (2020–2024)
- Marty Snider (2011–2024)
- Nate Ryan (2022–2024)
- Georgia Henneberry (2023–2024)
- Charlie Kimball (2024)

==== Host of IndyCar Live ====
- Mike Tirico (2019–2024) (NBC Host)
- Leigh Diffey
- Kevin Lee

==== Pre-Race Analysts/Presenters ====
- Danica Patrick (2019–2024)

=== Spanish-language commentators ===
- Lap-by-lap anchor: Sergio Rodríguez
- Color commentator: Jaime Macias
- Pitlane reporter: Ariana Figuera
- Studio host: Verónica Rodríguez

=== Former commentators ===
==== Lap-by-lap ====
- Rick Allen
- Rick Benjamin
- Don Criqui
- Bob Jenkins
- Charlie Jones
- Jim Lampley
- Paul Page
- Brian Till
- Bob Varsha
- Bill Weber

==== Driver analysts ====
- Jon Beekhuis
- Robbie Buhl (Versus only)
- Wally Dallenbach Jr.
- Derek Daly
- David Hobbs
- Sam Hornish Jr.
- Tommy Kendall
- Steve Matchett
- Tim Richmond
- Johnny Rutherford
- Jackie Stewart
- Bobby Unser
- Dan Wheldon (Versus only)
- A. J. Allmendinger (2019)
- Paul Tracy

==== Pit reporters ====
- Jack Arute (Versus only)
- Michelle Beisner
- Calvin Fish
- Robbie Floyd (Versus only)
- Gary Gerould
- Brian Hammons
- Bruce Jenner
- Anders Krohn
- Sally Larvick
- Cameron Steele
- Bill Stephens
- Lindy Thackston (Versus only)
- Hélio Castroneves
- Robin Miller
- Jon Beekhuis
- Will Buxton

==== Pre-Race Analysts/Presenters ====
- Dale Earnhardt Jr.
- Rutledge Wood
- Dale Jarrett

| Preceded by ABC/ESPN | Indianapolis 500 television broadcaster 2019–2024 | Succeeded by Fox/FS1 |
| Preceded by None | IndyCar Series pay television carrier in the United States; 2009–2024 (shared with ESPN from 2009–2018; NBCSN from 2019–2021 and USA/Peacock from 2022–2024) | Succeeded by Fox/FS1 |
