= IndyCar Series on ABC =

- Also known as: IndyCar Series on ESPN
- Genre: Auto racing telecasts
- Presented by: Allen Bestwick; Scott Goodyear; Eddie Cheever; Jon Beekhuis; Rick DeBruhl
- Country of origin: United States
- Original language: English

Production
- Camera setup: Multi-camera
- Running time: 180 minutes or until race ends
- Production company: ESPN on ABC

Original release
- Network: ABC
- Release: May 31, 1965 – June 3, 2018

Related
- IndyCar Series on NBC; NASCAR on ESPN

The IndyCar Series on ABC, also known as the IndyCar Series on ESPN, is the branding used for coverage of the IndyCar Series produced by ESPN, and formerly broadcast on ABC television network in the United States (through its ESPN on ABC division) between 1965 and 2018.

== Overview ==
ABC first began airing races that are now part of the IndyCar Series in 1965 with that year's running of the Indianapolis 500 on its Wide World of Sports anthology series, with the network having broadcast the 500 every year until 2019.

By the late 1980s, ABC carried many of the CART PPG IndyCar World Series races that supported the Indy 500. In late 1987, Paul Page was recruited from NBC Sports to join Bobby Unser (who worked with Paul at NBC) and Sam Posey in the broadcast booth to form what remains as one of the most memorable trios in American auto racing broadcasting. Page provided enthusiasm (and popular Indy 500 intros with the theme music from Delta Force), Unser his unmistakable directness, and Posey his signature artistic and poetic perspective of the sport. In 1989 and 1990, their presentation of the Indy 500 earned the network the Sports Emmy for the year's Outstanding Live Sports Special. By then, their pit reporters were Jack Arute, Gary Gerould, and Dr. Jerry Punch. All 6 men were often on ABC's broadcasts of the International Race of Champions and of NASCAR Winston Cup.

In 1996, Indianapolis Motor Speedway President Tony George led a group of breakaway owners in the founding of the Indy Racing League, with the 500 being its premier event. ABC added coverage of IRL races to the 500, and continued to broadcast CART Championship races through 2001. From the league's inception in 1996 through 2008, ESPN and ESPN2 also each carried several of the IndyCar Series, before losing the cable television rights to the series to Versus (now NBCSN). ABC and ESPN were IndyCar's exclusive television partners from 2000 to 2008. Despite losing the cable rights, on August 10, 2011, ESPN renewed ABC's end of its broadcast deal with the league through 2018.

Under that contract the network typically aired five races annually, though it had occasionally aired six during the season. In 2014, ABC celebrated its 50th consecutive broadcast of the Indianapolis 500.

ABC's coverage of the 2013 Firestone 550 at Texas Motor Speedway was the first prime time broadcast of IndyCar racing for the network. At the 2017 Indianapolis 500, ABC introduced "Race Strategist" (which featured predictive analysis of race conditions) and first-person "visor cam" views from Graham Rahal and Josef Newgarden.

=== Criticism ===
IndyCar fans who have criticized ESPN on ABC's race broadcasts have used "Always Bad Coverage" as a derisive backronym pertaining to the poor quality of the ABC telecasts.

=== Loss of IndyCar coverage ===
On March 21, 2018, NBC Sports announced that it had acquired the television rights to the IndyCar Series (after previously serving as cable rightsholder through NBCSN or CNBC for races not aired by ABC), replacing the package of races on ABC with a package of eight races on NBC, including the Indianapolis 500 (ending ABC's 54-year tenure as broadcaster of the event).

ABC’s final IndyCar telecast was the second race of the Detroit Grand Prix on June 3, 2018.

== On-air staff ==
=== 2018 team ===
Allen Bestwick was the lap-by-lap commentator while former IndyCar drivers Scott Goodyear and Eddie Cheever served as color commentators. Former driver Jon Beekhuis and Rick DeBruhl reported from the pits.

=== Former hosts ===
This includes ABC's coverage of USAC, CART and Champ Car, as well as IRL and INDYCAR-sanctioned races, from 1965 through 2018:

- Nicole Briscoe
- Charlie Brockman
- Lindsay Czarniak
- Dave Diles
- Terry Gannon
- Keith Jackson
- Bob Jenkins
- Jim McKay
- Al Michaels
- Brent Musburger
- Paul Page
- Chris Schenkel
- Jackie Stewart

=== Former play-by-play ===
- Rick Benjamin
- Allen Bestwick
- Charlie Brockman
- Todd Harris
- Keith Jackson
- Bob Jenkins
- Jim Lampley
- Jim McKay
- Paul Page
- Marty Reid
- Chris Schenkel
- Jackie Stewart
- Al Trautwig
- Bob Varsha

=== Former analysts ===
- Jack Arute
- Jon Beekhuis
- Eddie Cheever, 1998 Indianapolis 500 winner
- Gil de Ferran, 2003 Indianapolis 500 winner
- Chris Economaki
- Scott Goodyear
- Parker Johnstone
- Arie Luyendyk, 2 time Indy 500 winner
- Sam Posey
- Jason Priestley
- Larry Rice
- Tom Sneva, 1983 Indianapolis 500 winner
- Lyn St. James
- Jackie Stewart
- Danny Sullivan, 1985 Indianapolis 500 winner
- Bobby Unser, 3 time Indy 500 winner
- Rusty Wallace
- Rodger Ward, 2 time Indy 500 winner

=== Former pit reporters ===
- Jack Arute
- Jon Beekhuis
- Michelle Beisner
- Charlie Brockman
- Donna de Varona
- Rick DeBruhl
- Dave Diles
- Chris Economaki
- Bill Flemming
- Ray Gandolf
- Jerry Gappens
- Gary Gerould
- Leslie Gudel
- Brian Hammons
- Todd Harris
- Don Hein
- Penn Holderness
- Keith Jackson
- Jim Lampley
- David Letterman
- Jamie Little
- Jim McKay
- Larry Nuber
- Brienne Pedigo
- Jerry Punch
- Sam Posey
- Scott Pruett
- Marty Reid
- Lyn St. James
- Chris Schenkel
- Anne Simon
- Cameron Steele
- Bill Stephens
- Al Trautwig
- Vince Welch
- Jack Whitaker

== List of Broadcasts ==
=== USAC ===
Year	Date	Event	Track	Network	Coverage	Commentary		Pit Reporters
Year	Date	Event	Track	Network	Coverage	Lap-by-lap	Color	Pit Reporters
1977	March 27	(United States) Jimmy Bryan 150	Phoenix	ABC	Live	Jim McKay	Jackie Stewart	Chris Economaki
1977	April 30	(United States) Trenton 200	Trenton	ABC	Live	Jim McKay	Jackie Stewart	Chris Economaki
1977	May 29	(United States) Indianapolis 500	Indianapolis	ABC	Delayed	Jim McKay	Jackie Stewart	Chris Economaki; Bill Flemming
1977	September 17	(United States) Gould Grand Prix	Michigan	ABC	Highlights	Jim McKay	Jackie Stewart	Chris Economaki
1978	March 18	(United States) Jimmy Bryan 150	Phoenix	ABC	Live	Jim McKay	Sam Posey	Chris Economaki
1978	April 23	(United States) Gabriel 200	Trenton	ABC	Live	Jim McKay	Jackie Stewart	Chris Economaki
1978	May 28	(United States) Indianapolis 500	Indianapolis	ABC	Delayed	Jim McKay	Jackie Stewart	Chris Economaki; Bill Flemming; Sam Posey
1978	September 16	(United States) Gould Grand Prix	Michigan	ABC	Highlights	Jim McKay	Jackie Stewart	Chris Economaki
1978	October 1	(United Kingdom) Daily Express Indy Silverstone	Silverstone	ABC	Highlights	Jim McKay	Jackie Stewart	Chris Economaki

=== CART / Champ Car ===
==== ABC ====
Year	Date	Event	Track	Network	Coverage	Commentary		Pit Reporters
Year	Date	Event	Track	Network	Coverage	Lap-by-lap	Color	Pit Reporters
1979	April 22	Gould Twin Dixie 125	Atlanta	ABC	Highlights / Live	Al Michaels	Jackie Stewart	Chris Economaki
1979	May 27	Indianapolis 500	Indianapolis	ABC	Delayed	Jim McKay	Jackie Stewart	Chris Economaki; Bill Flemming
1987	April 12	Checker 200	Phoenix	ABC	Live	Jim Lampley	Sam Posey	Jack Arute; Bobby Unser
1987	May 24	71st Indianapolis 500	Indianapolis	ABC	Live	Jim Lampley	Sam Posey; Bobby Unser	Jack Arute; Al Trautwig; Jerry Gappens
1987	July 5	Budweiser Grand Prix of Cleveland	Cleveland	ABC	Live	Al Trautwig	Sam Posey; Bobby Unser	Jack Arute
1987	August 2	Marlboro 500	Michigan	ABC	Live	Al Trautwig	Sam Posey; Bobby Unser	Jack Arute; Jerry Gappens
1987	September 20	Bosch Spark Plug Grand Prix	Nazareth	ABC	Live	Paul Page	Sam Posey; Bobby Unser	Jack Arute
1987	November 1	Nissan Indy Challenge	Tamiami Park	ABC	Live	Paul Page	Sam Posey; Bobby Unser	Jack Arute
1991	April 14	Toyota Grand Prix of Long Beach	Long Beach	ABC	Live	Paul Page	Sam Posey; Bobby Unser	Jack Arute; Gary Gerould
1991	April 21	Valvoline 200	Phoenix	ABC	Live	Paul Page	Sam Posey; Bobby Unser	Jack Arute; Gary Gerould
1991	May 26	75th Indianapolis 500	Indianapolis	ABC	Live	Paul Page	Sam Posey; Bobby Unser	Jack Arute; Gary Gerould; Jerry Punch
1991	June 2	Miller Genuine Draft 200, in Honor of Rex Mays	Milwaukee	ABC	Live	Paul Page	Sam Posey; Bobby Unser	Gary Gerould; Jerry Punch
1991	August 4	Marlboro 500	Michigan	ABC	Live	Paul Page	Sam Posey; Bobby Unser	Jack Arute; Gary Gerould
1991	August 25	Texaco/Havoline Grand Prix of Denver	Streets of Denver	ABC	Live	Paul Page	Sam Posey; Bobby Unser	Jack Arute; Gary Gerould
1992	April 5	Valvoline 200	Phoenix	ABC	Live	Paul Page	Sam Posey; Bobby Unser	Jack Arute; Gary Gerould
1992	April 12	Toyota Grand Prix of Long Beach	Long Beach	ABC	Live	Paul Page	Sam Posey; Bobby Unser	Jack Arute; Gary Gerould
1992	May 24	76th Indianapolis 500	Indianapolis	ABC	Live	Paul Page	Sam Posey; Bobby Unser	Jack Arute; Gary Gerould; Jerry Punch
1992	June 12	ITT Automotive Detroit Grand Prix	Belle Isle	ABC	Live	Paul Page	Sam Posey; Bobby Unser	Jack Arute; Gary Gerould
1992	June 28	Miller Genuine Draft 200	Milwaukee	ABC	Live	Paul Page	Sam Posey; Bobby Unser	Jack Arute; Gary Gerould
1992	July 19	Molson Indy Toronto	Exhibition Place	ABC	Live	Paul Page	Sam Posey; Bobby Unser	Jack Arute; Gary Gerould
1992	August 2	Marlboro 500	Michigan	ABC	Live	Paul Page	Sam Posey; Bobby Unser	Jack Arute; Gary Gerould
1993	March 21	Australian FAI IndyCar Grand Prix	Surfers Paradise	ABC	Delayed	Paul Page	Bobby Unser	Jack Arute; Gary Gerould
1993	April 4	Valvoline 200	Phoenix	ABC	Live	Paul Page	Sam Posey; Bobby Unser	Jack Arute; Gary Gerould
1993	April 18	Toyota Grand Prix of Long Beach	Long Beach	ABC	Live	Paul Page	Sam Posey; Bobby Unser	Jack Arute; Gary Gerould
1993	May 30	77th Indianapolis 500	Indianapolis	ABC	Live	Paul Page	Sam Posey; Bobby Unser	Jack Arute; Gary Gerould; Jerry Punch
1993	June 6	Miller Genuine Draft 200	Milwaukee	ABC	Live	Paul Page	Sam Posey; Bobby Unser	Jack Arute; Gary Gerould
1993	June 13	ITT Automotive Detroit Grand Prix	Belle Isle	ABC	Live	Paul Page	Sam Posey; Bobby Unser	Jack Arute; Gary Gerould
1993	July 11	Budweiser Grand Prix of Cleveland	Cleveland	ABC	Live	Paul Page	Sam Posey; Bobby Unser	Jack Arute; Gary Gerould
1993	July 18	Molson Indy Toronto	Exhibition Place	ABC	Live	Paul Page	Sam Posey; Bobby Unser	Jack Arute; Gary Gerould
1993	August 1	Marlboro 500	Michigan	ABC	Live	Paul Page	Sam Posey; Bobby Unser	Jack Arute; Gary Gerould
1994	March 19	Australian FAI IndyCar Grand Prix	Surfers Paradise	ABC	Delayed	Paul Page	Sam Posey; Bobby Unser	Jack Arute; Gary Gerould
1994	April 10	Toyota Grand Prix of Long Beach	Long Beach	ABC	Live	Paul Page	Sam Posey; Bobby Unser	Jack Arute; Gary Gerould
1994	May 29	78th Indianapolis 500	Indianapolis	ABC	Live	Paul Page	Sam Posey; Bobby Unser; Danny Sullivan	Jack Arute; Gary Gerould; Jerry Punch
1994	June 5	Miller Genuine Draft 200	Milwaukee	ABC	Live	Paul Page	Sam Posey; Bobby Unser	Jack Arute; Gary Gerould
1994	June 12	ITT Automotive Detroit Grand Prix	Belle Isle	ABC	Live	Paul Page	Sam Posey; Bobby Unser	Jack Arute; Gary Gerould
1994	July 10	Budweiser Grand Prix of Cleveland	Cleveland	ABC	Live	Paul Page	Sam Posey; Bobby Unser	Jack Arute; Gary Gerould
1994	August 14	Miller Genuine Draft 200	Mid Ohio	ABC	Live	Paul Page	Sam Posey; Bobby Unser	Jack Arute; Gary Gerould
1995	March 5	Marlboro Grand Prix of Miami	Bicentennial Park	ABC	Live	Paul Page	Sam Posey; Bobby Unser	Jack Arute; Gary Gerould
1995	March 19	IndyCar Australia	Surfers Paradise	ABC	Delayed	Paul Page	Sam Posey; Bobby Unser	Jack Arute; Gary Gerould
1995	April 2	Slick 50 200	Phoenix	ABC	Live	Paul Page	Sam Posey; Bobby Unser	Jack Arute; Gary Gerould
1995	April 9	Toyota Grand Prix of Long Beach	Long Beach	ABC	Live	Paul Page	Sam Posey; Bobby Unser	Jack Arute; Gary Gerould
1995	May 28	79th Indianapolis 500	Indianapolis	ABC	Live	Paul Page	Sam Posey; Bobby Unser	Jack Arute; Gary Gerould; Jerry Punch
1995	June 4	Miller Genuine Draft 200	Milwaukee	ABC	Live	Paul Page	Sam Posey; Bobby Unser	Jack Arute; Gary Gerould
1995	June 11	ITT Automotive Detroit Grand Prix	Belle Isle	ABC	Live	Paul Page	Sam Posey; Bobby Unser	Jack Arute; Lyn St. James
1995	July 16	Molson Indy Toronto	Exhibition Place	ABC	Live	Paul Page	Sam Posey; Lyn St. James	Jack Arute; Gary Gerould
1995	July 23	Medic Drug Grand Prix of Cleveland	Cleveland	ABC	Live	Paul Page	Sam Posey; Lyn St. James	Jack Arute; Gary Gerould
1995	July 30	Marlboro 500	Michigan	ABC	Live	Paul Page	Sam Posey; Bobby Unser	Jack Arute; Gary Gerould
1995	August 13	Miller Genuine Draft 200	Mid Ohio	ABC	Live	Paul Page	Sam Posey; Bobby Unser	Jack Arute; Gary Gerould
1996	March 3	Marlboro Grand Prix of Miami	Homestead-Miami	ABC; ESPN	Live	Paul Page	Danny Sullivan	Jack Arute; Gary Gerould
1996	March 17	IndyCar Rio 400	Jacarepaguá	ABC	Delayed	Paul Page	Danny Sullivan	Jack Arute; Gary Gerould
1996	March 31	Bartercard Indycar Australia	Surfers Paradise	ABC	Delayed	Paul Page	Danny Sullivan	Jack Arute; Jon Beekhuis
1996	April 14	Toyota Grand Prix of Long Beach	Long Beach	ABC	Live	Paul Page	Danny Sullivan	Jack Arute; Gary Gerould
1996	April 28	Bosch Spark Plug Grand Prix	Nazareth	ABC	Live	Paul Page	Bobby Unser	Jack Arute; Gary Gerould
1996	June 2	Miller 200	Milwaukee	ABC	Live	Paul Page	Danny Sullivan	Jack Arute; Gary Gerould
1996	June 11	ITT Automotive Detroit Grand Prix	Belle Isle	ABC	Live	Paul Page	Danny Sullivan	Jack Arute; Jerry Punch
1996	June 23	Budweiser/G. I. Joe's 200	Portland	ABC	Live	Paul Page	Danny Sullivan	Jack Arute; Gary Gerould
1996	June 30	Medic Drug Grand Prix of Cleveland	Cleveland	ABC	Live	Paul Page	Danny Sullivan	Jack Arute; Gary Gerould
1996	July 14	Molson Indy Toronto	Exhibition Place	ABC	Live	Paul Page	Danny Sullivan	Jack Arute; Gary Gerould
1996	July 28	Marlboro 500	Michigan	ABC	Delayed	Paul Page	Danny Sullivan	Jack Arute; Gary Gerould
1996	August 13	Miller 200	Mid Ohio	ABC	Live	Paul Page	Danny Sullivan	Jack Arute; Gary Gerould
1997	March 2	Marlboro Grand Prix of Miami	Homestead-Miami	ABC	Live	Bob Varsha	Danny Sullivan	Jack Arute; Gary Gerould
1997	April 6	Sunbelt IndyCarnival	Surfers Paradise	ABC	Delayed	Bob Varsha	Jon Beekhuis	Jack Arute; Gary Gerould
1997	April 13	Toyota Grand Prix of Long Beach	Long Beach	ABC	Live	Bob Varsha	Danny Sullivan	Jack Arute; Gary Gerould
1997	April 27	Bosch Spark Plug Grand Prix	Nazareth	ABC	Live	Bob Varsha	Danny Sullivan	Jack Arute; Gary Gerould
1997	May 11	Hollywood Rio 400K	Jacarepaguá	ABC	Delayed	Bob Varsha	Danny Sullivan	Jon Beekhuis; Marty Reid
1997	May 24	Motorola 300	Gateway	ABC	Live	Bob Varsha	Danny Sullivan	Jon Beekhuis; Marty Reid
1997	June 8	ITT Automotive Detroit Grand Prix	Belle Isle	ABC	Live	Bob Varsha	Danny Sullivan	Jack Arute; Gary Gerould
1997	July 13	Medic Drug Grand Prix of Cleveland	Cleveland	ABC	Live	Bob Varsha	Danny Sullivan	Gary Gerould; Jon Beekhuis
1997	July 20	Molson Indy Toronto	Exhibition Place	ABC	Live	Bob Varsha	Danny Sullivan	Gary Gerould; Marty Reid
1997	July 27	U.S. 500	Michigan	ABC	Live	Bob Varsha	Danny Sullivan	Jack Arute; Gary Gerould
1997	August 13	Miller 200	Mid Ohio	ABC	Live	Bob Varsha	Danny Sullivan	Jack Arute; Gary Gerould

==== ESPN ====
Year	Date	Event	Track	Network	Coverage	Commentary		Pit Reporters
Year	Date	Event	Track	Network	Coverage	Lap-by-lap	Color	Pit Reporters
1991	June 23	Texaco/Havoline Presents the Budweiser/G. I. Joe's 200	Portland	ESPN	Live	Paul Page	Derek Daly	Gary Gerould; Jon Beekhuis
1991	July 8	Budweiser Grand Prix of Cleveland	Cleveland	ESPN	Live	Paul Page	Derek Daly	Gary Gerould; Jon Beekhuis
1991	July 14	Marlboro Grand Prix	Meadowlands	ESPN	Live	Paul Page	Derek Daly	Gary Gerould; Jon Beekhuis
1991	July 21	Molson Indy Toronto	Exhibition Place	ESPN	Live	Paul Page	Derek Daly	Gary Gerould; Jon Beekhuis
1991	September 1	Molson Indy Vancouver	Vancouver	ESPN	Live	Paul Page	Derek Daly	Gary Gerould; Jon Beekhuis
1991	September 15	Pioneer Electronics 200	Mid Ohio	ESPN	Live	Paul Page	Derek Daly	Gary Gerould; Jon Beekhuis
1991	September 22	The Chicago Tribune Presents the Texaco/Havoline 200	Road America	ESPN	Live	Paul Page	Derek Daly	Gary Gerould; Jon Beekhuis
1991	October 6	Bosch Spark Plug Grand Prix	Nazareth	ESPN	Delayed	Paul Page	Derek Daly	Gary Gerould; Jon Beekhuis
1991	October 19	Marlboro Challenge	Laguna Seca	ESPN	Delayed	Paul Page	Derek Daly	Gary Gerould; Jon Beekhuis
1991	October 20	Kodalux Processing 300	Laguna Seca	ESPN	Delayed	Paul Page	Derek Daly	Gary Gerould; Jon Beekhuis
1992	March 22	Daikyo IndyCar Grand Prix	Surfers Paradise	ESPN	Live	Paul Page	Tom Sneva	Gary Gerould; Jon Beekhuis
1992	June 21	Texaco/Havoline Presents the Budweiser/G. I. Joe's 200	Portland	ESPN	Live	Paul Page	Derek Daly	Gary Gerould; Jon Beekhuis
1992	July 5	New England 200	New Hampshire	ESPN	Live	Paul Page	Derek Daly	Gary Gerould; Jon Beekhuis
1992	August 9	Budweiser Grand Prix of Cleveland	Cleveland	ESPN	Live	Paul Page	Derek Daly	Gary Gerould; Jon Beekhuis
1992	August 23	The Chicago Tribune Presents the Texaco/Havoline 200	Road America	ESPN	Live	Paul Page	Derek Daly	Gary Gerould; Jon Beekhuis
1992	August 30	Molson Indy Vancouver	Vancouver	ESPN	Live	Paul Page	Derek Daly	Gary Gerould; Jon Beekhuis
1992	September 13	Pioneer Electronics 200	Mid Ohio	ESPN	Live	Paul Page	Derek Daly	Gary Gerould; Jon Beekhuis
1992	October 3	Marlboro Challenge	Nazareth	ESPN	Delayed	Paul Page	Derek Daly	Gary Gerould; Jon Beekhuis
1992	October 4	Bosch Spark Plug Grand Prix	Nazareth	ESPN	Delayed	Paul Page	Derek Daly	Gary Gerould; Jon Beekhuis
1992	October 18	Kodalux Processing 300	Laguna Seca	ESPN	Delayed	Paul Page	Derek Daly	Gary Gerould; Jon Beekhuis
1993	June 27	Texaco/Havoline Presents the Budweiser/G. I. Joe's 200	Portland	ESPN	Live	Paul Page	Derek Daly	Gary Gerould; Jon Beekhuis
1993	August 8	New England 200	New Hampshire	ESPN	Live	Paul Page	Derek Daly	Gary Gerould; Jon Beekhuis
1993	August 22	The Chicago Tribune Presents the Texaco/Havoline 200	Road America	ESPN	Live	Paul Page	Derek Daly	Gary Gerould; Jon Beekhuis
1993	August 29	Molson Indy Vancouver	Vancouver	ESPN	Live	Paul Page	Derek Daly	Gary Gerould; Jon Beekhuis
1993	September 12	Pioneer Electronics 200	Mid Ohio	ESPN	Live	Paul Page	Derek Daly	Gary Gerould; Jon Beekhuis
1993	September 19	Bosch Spark Plug Grand Prix	Nazareth	ESPN	Delayed	Paul Page	Derek Daly	Gary Gerould; Jon Beekhuis
1993	October 3	Makita 300	Laguna Seca	ESPN2	Delayed	Paul Page	Derek Daly	Gary Gerould; Jon Beekhuis
1994	April 2	Slick 50 200	Phoenix	ESPN	Live	Paul Page	Derek Daly	Gary Gerould; Jon Beekhuis
1994	June 26	Texaco/Havoline Presents the Budweiser/G. I. Joe's 200	Portland	ESPN	Live	Paul Page	Derek Daly	Gary Gerould; Jon Beekhuis
1994	July 31	Marlboro 500	Michigan	ESPN	Live	Paul Page	Derek Daly	Gary Gerould; Jon Beekhuis
1994	August 21	New England 200	New Hampshire	ESPN	Live	Paul Page	Derek Daly	Gary Gerould; Jon Beekhuis
1994	September 4	Molson Indy Vancouver	Vancouver	ESPN	Delayed	Paul Page	Derek Daly	Gary Gerould; Jon Beekhuis
1994	September 11	The Chicago Tribune Presents the Texaco/Havoline 200	Road America	ESPN	Live	Paul Page	Derek Daly	Gary Gerould; Jon Beekhuis
1994	September 18	Bosch Spark Plug Grand Prix	Nazareth	ESPN	Live	Paul Page	Derek Daly	Gary Gerould; Jon Beekhuis
1994	October 9	Bank of America 300	Laguna Seca	ESPN	Live	Paul Page	Derek Daly	Gary Gerould; Jon Beekhuis
1995	June 25	Texaco/Havoline Presents the Budweiser/G. I. Joe's 200	Portland	ESPN	Live	Paul Page	Derek Daly	Gary Gerould; Jon Beekhuis
1995	July 9	The Chicago Tribune Presents the Texaco/Havoline 200	Road America	ESPN	Live	Paul Page	Derek Daly	Gary Gerould; Jon Beekhuis
1995	August 20	New England 200	New Hampshire	ESPN2	Live	Paul Page	Derek Daly	Gary Gerould; Jon Beekhuis
1995	September 3	Molson Indy Vancouver	Vancouver	ESPN	Live	Paul Page	Derek Daly	Gary Gerould; Jon Beekhuis
1995	September 10	Bank of America 300	Laguna Seca	ESPN2	Live	Paul Page	Derek Daly	Gary Gerould; Jon Beekhuis
1996	May 26	U.S. 500	Michigan	ESPN	Live	Bob Varsha	Scott Goodyear	Jon Beekhuis; Marty Reid; James Allen
1996	August 18	The Chicago Tribune Presents the Texaco/Havoline 200	Road America	ESPN2	Live	Bob Varsha	Danny Sullivan	Jon Beekhuis; Marty Reid
1996	September 1	Molson Indy Vancouver	Vancouver	ESPN2	Live	Paul Page	Danny Sullivan	Gary Gerould; Jon Beekhuis
1996	September 8	Bank of America 300	Laguna Seca	ESPN	Live	Paul Page	Danny Sullivan	Gary Gerould; Jon Beekhuis
1997	June 1	Miller 200	Milwaukee	ESPN	Live	Bob Varsha	Danny Sullivan	Gary Gerould; Jon Beekhuis
1997	June 22	Budweiser/G. I. Joe's 200 Presented by Texaco/Havoline	Portland	ESPN	Live	Bob Varsha	Danny Sullivan	Gary Gerould; Marty Reid
1997	August 17	The Chicago Tribune Presents the Texaco/Havoline 200	Road America	ESPN	Live	Bob Varsha	Danny Sullivan	Gary Gerould; Marty Reid
1997	August 31	Molson Indy Vancouver	Vancouver	ESPN	Live	Bob Varsha	Danny Sullivan	Gary Gerould; Jon Beekhuis
1997	September 7	Texaco/Havoline 300	Laguna Seca	ESPN	Live	Bob Varsha	Danny Sullivan	Gary Gerould; Jon Beekhuis
1997	September 21	Marlboro 500	Auto Club	ESPN	Delayed	Bob Varsha	Danny Sullivan	Gary Gerould; Jon Beekhuis

=== IRL / IndyCar ===
Year	Date	Event	Track	Network	Coverage	Commentary		Pit Reporters
Year	Date	Event	Track	Network	Coverage	Lap-by-lap	Color	Pit Reporters
1996	January 27	Indy 200 at Walt Disney World	Walt Disney World	ABC	Live	Paul Page	Bobby Unser; Danny Sullivan	Jack Arute; Gary Gerould
1996	March 24	Dura Lube 200	Phoenix	ABC	Live	Paul Page	Bobby Unser; Danny Sullivan	Jack Arute; Gary Gerould
1996	May 26	80th Indianapolis 500	Indianapolis	ABC	Live	Paul Page	Bobby Unser; Danny Sullivan	Jack Arute; Gary Gerould; Jerry Punch
1996-97	August 18	True Value 200	New Hampshire	ABC	Live	Paul Page	Bobby Unser	Jack Arute; Gary Gerould
1996-97	September 15	1996 Las Vegas 500K	Las Vegas	ABC	Live	Paul Page	Bobby Unser; Danny Sullivan	Jack Arute; Gary Gerould
1996-97	January 25	Indy 200 at Walt Disney World	Walt Disney World	ABC	Live	Paul Page	Tom Sneva	Jack Arute; Gary Gerould
1996-97	March 25	Phoenix 200	Phoenix	ABC	Live	Paul Page	Tom Sneva	Jack Arute; Gary Gerould
1996-97	~~May 25~~; ~~May 26~~; May 27	81st Indianapolis 500	Indianapolis	ABC	Live (Note: The 1997 Indianapolis 500 was scheduled to be on May 25th but was rained out, was rescheduled for May 26th but ran 15 laps and was rained out and was rescheduled for May 27th.)	Paul Page	Tom Sneva; Bobby Unser; Danny Sullivan	Jack Arute; Gary Gerould; Jerry Punch
1996-97	June 7	True Value 500	Texas	ESPN2	Live	Paul Page	Jon Beekhuis	Jerry Punch; Marty Reid
1996-97	June 29	Samsonite 200	Pikes Peak	ABC	Live	Paul Page	Tom Sneva	Jack Arute; Jon Beekhuis
1996-97	August 17	Pennzoil 200	New Hampshire	ABC	Live	Paul Page	Tom Sneva	Jack Arute; Jon Beekhuis
1996-97	October 11	1997 Las Vegas 500K	Las Vegas	ABC	Live	Paul Page	Tom Sneva	Gary Gerould; Jon Beekhuis
1998	January 24	Indy 200 at Walt Disney World	Walt Disney World	ABC	Live	Paul Page	Tom Sneva	Jack Arute; Gary Gerould
1998	March 22	Dura Lube 200	Phoenix	ABC	Live	Paul Page	Tom Sneva	Jack Arute; Gary Gerould
1998	May 24	82nd Indianapolis 500	Indianapolis	ABC	Live	Paul Page	Tom Sneva	Jack Arute; Gary Gerould; Jerry Punch
1998	August 16	Radisson 200	Pikes Peak	ABC	Live	Paul Page	Mike Groff	Jack Arute; Jon Beekhuis
1998	September 20	Lone Star 500	Texas	ABC	Live	Paul Page	Mike Groff	Jack Arute; Jon Beekhuis
1999	January 24	TransWorld Diversified Services Indy 200	Walt Disney World	ABC	Live	Paul Page	Tom Sneva	Jack Arute; Gary Gerould
1999	May 30	82nd Indianapolis 500	Indianapolis	ABC	Live	Bob Jenkins	Tom Sneva	Jerry Punch; Gary Gerould; Jon Beekhuis
1999	September 26	Vegas.com 500	Las Vegas	ESPN2	Live	Bob Jenkins	Arie Luyendyk	Jack Arute; Vince Welch
1999	October 17	Mall.com 500	Texas	ABC; ESPN2	Live	Jack Arute	Arie Luyendyk	Marty Reid; Vince Welch
2013	May 26	97th Indianapolis 500	Indianapolis	ABC	Live	Marty Reid	Scott Goodyear; Eddie Cheever	Vince Welch; Jamie Little; Rick DeBruhl; Jerry Punch
2013	June 1	Chevrolet Indy Dual in Detroit Race 1	Belle Isle	ABC	Live	Marty Reid	Scott Goodyear; Eddie Cheever	Vince Welch; Jamie Little; Rick DeBruhl
2013	June 2	Chevrolet Indy Dual in Detroit Race 2	Belle Isle	ABC	Live	Marty Reid	Scott Goodyear; Eddie Cheever	Vince Welch; Jamie Little; Rick DeBruhl
2013	June 8	Firestone 550	Texas	ABC	Live	Marty Reid	Scott Goodyear; Eddie Cheever	Vince Welch; Jamie Little; Rick DeBruhl
2013	June 23	Iowa Corn Indy 250	Iowa Speedway	ABC	Live	Marty Reid	Scott Goodyear; Eddie Cheever	Vince Welch; Jamie Little; Rick DeBruhl
2013	July 7	Pocono IndyCar 400 fueled by Sunoco	Pocono Raceway	ABC	Live	Marty Reid	Scott Goodyear; Eddie Cheever	Vince Welch; Jamie Little; Rick DeBruhl
2017	March 12	Firestone Grand Prix of St. Petersburg	Streets of St. Petersburg	ABC	Live	Allen Bestwick	Scott Goodyear; Eddie Cheever	Jon Beekhuis; Rick DeBruhl; Jerry Punch
2017	May 13	IndyCar Grand Prix	Indianapolis Road Course	ABC	Live	Allen Bestwick	Scott Goodyear; Eddie Cheever	Jon Beekhuis; Rick DeBruhl; Jerry Punch
2017	May 28	101st Indianapolis 500	Indianapolis	ABC	Live	Allen Bestwick	Scott Goodyear; Eddie Cheever	Jon Beekhuis; Rick DeBruhl; Jerry Punch; Marty Smith
2017	June 3	Chevrolet Detroit Grand Prix Race 1	Belle Isle	ABC	Live	Allen Bestwick	Scott Goodyear; Eddie Cheever	Jon Beekhuis; Rick DeBruhl; Jerry Punch
2017	June 4	Chevrolet Detroit Grand Prix Race 2	Belle Isle	ABC	Live	Allen Bestwick	Scott Goodyear; Eddie Cheever	Jon Beekhuis; Rick DeBruhl; Jerry Punch
2018	March 11	Firestone Grand Prix of St. Petersburg	Streets of St. Petersburg	ABC	Live	Allen Bestwick	Scott Goodyear; Eddie Cheever	Jon Beekhuis; Rick DeBruhl
2018	May 12	IndyCar Grand Prix	Indianapolis Road Course	ABC	Live	Allen Bestwick	Scott Goodyear; Eddie Cheever	Jon Beekhuis; Rick DeBruhl; Jerry Punch
2018	May 27	102nd Indianapolis 500	Indianapolis	ABC	Live	Allen Bestwick	Scott Goodyear; Eddie Cheever	Jon Beekhuis; Rick DeBruhl; Jerry Punch; Marty Smith
2018	June 2	Chevrolet Detroit Grand Prix Race 1	Belle Isle	ABC	Live	Allen Bestwick	Scott Goodyear; Eddie Cheever	Jon Beekhuis; Rick DeBruhl
2018	June 3	Chevrolet Detroit Grand Prix Race 2	Belle Isle	ABC	Live	Allen Bestwick	Scott Goodyear; Eddie Cheever	Jon Beekhuis; Rick DeBruhl
