= Jon Beekhuis =

American race car driver (born 1960)

Jon Beekhuis (/ˌjɒn ˈbiːkəs/; born March 31, 1960) is an American former race car driver. Beekhuis was born in Zurich, Switzerland while his American father was studying at ETH Zurich, and grew up in California. Beekhuis was the 1988 ARS (Indy Lights) champion, and subsequently drove in 14 CART series races from 1989 to 1992. However, he never drove in the Indianapolis 500. His best finish was an 8th at the 1990 Michigan 500.

Starting in 1991, Beekhuis became a pit reporter for ESPN and ABC and then SPEED/CBS coverage of CART and Champ Car World Series races. Beekhuis moved to the booth as Champ Car television's lead analyst in 2007, but the 2007 season was the last for CCWS. In 2008, he was the pit reporter for select IndyCar Series races at Edmonton and Surfers Paradise.

From 2009 to 2018, Beekhuis served as one of the lead pit reporters for Versus/NBCSN telecasts of the IndyCar Series. From 2015 to 2018, Beekhuis also worked the pits for ABC's package of five IndyCar races, which included the Indianapolis 500.

Beekhuis' daughter, Jaye, is a published author.

== Racing record ==
=== American open–wheel racing results ===
(key)

==== Indy Lights ====
Year	Team	1	2	3	4	5	6	7	8	9	10	11	12	Rank	Points
1988	Enterprise Racing	PHX; 16	MIL; 4	POR; 3	CLE; 4	TOR; 4	MWL; 1	POC; 12	MDO; 1	ROA; 2	NAZ; 5	LAG; 2	MIA; 5	1st	147

==== CART ====
Year	Team	1	2	3	4	5	6	7	8	9	10	11	12	13	14	15	16	17	Rank	Points	Ref
1989	Bettenhausen Racing	PHX	LBH	INDY	MIL	DET	POR	CLE	MEA	TOR; 13	MIS	POC	MDO	ROA; 24	NAZ	LS; 15			36th	0	
1990	P. I. G. Racing	PHX	LBH; 16	INDY	MIL	DET; 18	POR	CLE	MEA	TOR; 25		DEN; 22	VAN; 21	MDO; 24	ROA; 11	NAZ	LS; 27		21st	7	
1990	Gohr Racing										MIS; 8								21st	7	
1991	Walker Motorsport	SRF	LBH	PHX	INDY	MIL	DET	POR	CLE	MEA	TOR	MIS; DNS	DEN	VAN	MDO	ROA	NAZ	LS	NC	–	
1992	A. J. Foyt Enterprises	SRF	PHX	LBH	INDY	DET	POR	MIL	NHA	TOR; 18									47th	0	
1992	Walker Motorsport										MIS; 21	CLE	ROA	VAN	MDO	NAZ	LS		47th	0	

== Notes ==
Sporting positions
Preceded by Didier Theys	American Racing Series Champion; 1988	Succeeded by Mike Groff
