= Gary Gerould =

American sports broadcaster

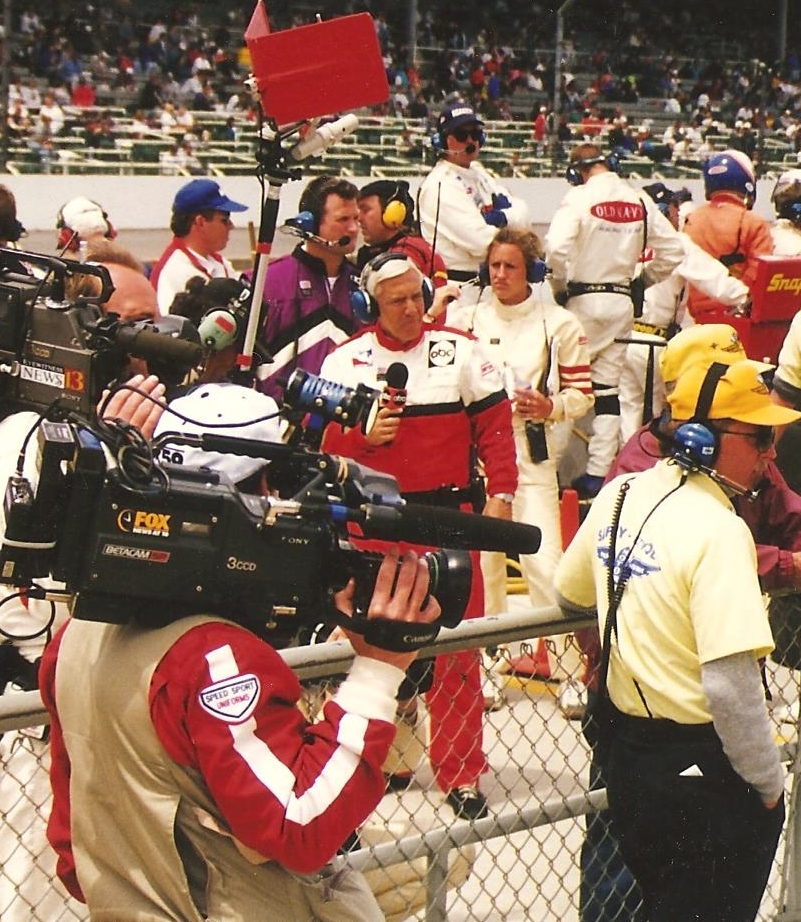
Gary Gerould at the 1997 Indianapolis 500

Gary Gerould, nicknamed “The G-Man”, is an American sportscaster, best known as the radio voice of the Sacramento Kings of the National Basketball Association since 1985, a role where he continues working as of 2026. He ws also a motorsports reporter for NBC, ABC and ESPN on IndyCar Series, NASCAR and NHRA broadcasts.

== Career ==
Gerould was born in Midland, Michigan and got his start in broadcasting at the age of 15 on a local telegraph station. He graduated at Anderson University in Indiana.

Then he moved to Chico, California to work as a sports repirter for KHSL Radio, covering local football, basketball and motorsports. Later he moved to KCRA-AM and KCRA TV.

Geroud began working on NBC Sports in 1979, usually as a pit reporter on USAC, CART and NASCAR Cup auto races. He also filled that role for the Formula One Caesars Palace Grand Prix in 1981 and 1982. Geroud also called play-by-play for NBC's NFL coverage in the early 1980s, and had the opportunity to cover the 1988 Summer Olympics for the network.

In 1985 as the Kansas City Kings moved to Sacramento, Gerould was tabbed as their radio play-by-play announcer. During the 2010–11 season, Gerould completed his 2,000 Kings broadcast, ranking fifth among active NBA announcers.

In the 1980s and 1990s, he also worked for the motorsports program American Sports Cavalcade.

Giroud added ESPN auto races to his schedule in 1989. In 1990 he left NBC for ABC, where he continued as a pit reporter for CART/Champ Car and the IndyCar Series, including the Indianapolis 500, as well as for NASCAR and the National Hot Rod Association.

Geroud made a comeback into pit reporting for ABC's coverage of the IndyCar race at the New Hampshire International Speedway in August 2011.

In October 2015, Gerould announced his retirement from television sportscasting; However, it was announced on June 25, 2020, that Gerould would briefly return as the TV play-by-play announcer for the Kings during the resumption of the suspended NBA season following the resignation of Grant Napear.

Gerould runs his own public relations outfit. His son Bob is also a sports broadcaster.
