= Jack Arute =

American former sportscaster

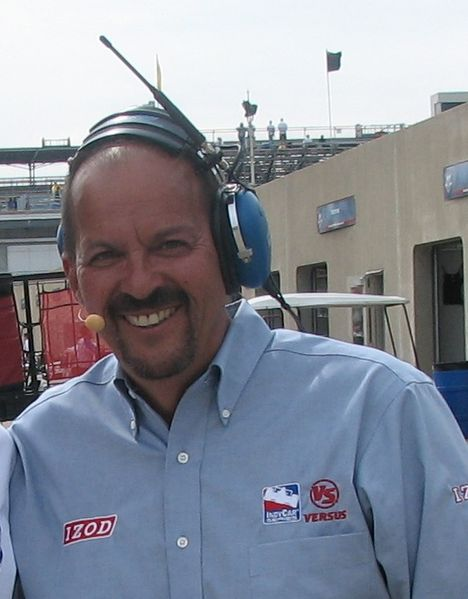
- Arute at the Indianapolis Motor Speedway in 2009
- Born: September 28, 1950 (age 76); New Britain, Connecticut, U.S.
- Education: University of Vermont
- Occupation: Sportscaster

Jack Arute III (/əˈruːt/ ə-ROOT; born September 28, 1950) is an American former sportscaster for the NFL and college sports for SiriusXM Radio. He was formerly an auto racing pit reporter and college football sideline reporter for ESPN and ABC, and covered the Izod IndyCar Series and the NASCAR Whelen Modified Tour on Versus.

== Biography ==
Arute was born in New Britain, Connecticut, the son of Jack Arute Jr. and grandson of Jack Arute Sr., owners of a prominent construction company in the state. Arute Field, a football stadium in New Britain, is named for the family. Arute is a graduate of the University of Vermont.

Arute began his work with ABC Sports and ESPN in 1984, after serving as a radio commentator for the Motor Racing Network from 1972 to 1980, where he was known as "Jackie Arute" as to distinguish him from his father. He then served as Vice President of Charlotte Motor Speedway in 1980. In recent years, he has served as president of the family-owned Stafford Motor Speedway, a regional NASCAR track in Stafford Springs, Connecticut, a track that the family has owned since 1970. His brother Mark is the CEO of the track.

Arute was one of the track announcers during the 1970s, establishing the circuit as a top race track in the Northeast, establishing a strong link of announcers, which also included Mike Joy.

Arute worked as a pit reporter on CART, Indy Racing League (IRL), and NASCAR telecasts on ESPN and ABC from 1984 to 1998 and 2000 to 2009. In 1999, he covered the IRL for Fox Sports Net and Speedvision. In some instances, namely in 2004, Arute served as a booth announcer. During the same time period at ESPN and ABC, during the off-season of auto racing, Arute served as a sideline reporter for college football and during at least one NFL playoff game.

In 2009, Arute joined the Versus television on-air crew for the 2009 IndyCar season, serving on both the Versus and ABC telecasts. In August 2009, Indianapolis Star reporter Curt Cavin said that Arute would be leaving ESPN at the end of 2009 in favor of Versus full-time. He was fired from Versus due to cost-cutting moves after the acquisition of NBC Universal by Comcast. He was replaced by Kevin Lee, who is also a pit reporter for the Indianapolis Motor Speedway Radio Network.

Currently, Arute does radio work with SiriusXM's Channel 90 with Trading Paint with Chocolate Myers on Thursdays and Fridays. Arute lives in Hampden, Massachusetts.
