= IndyCar on television =

The television rights to broadcast the IndyCar Series in the United States have varied between different broadcasters since the series' founding as the Indy Racing League (IRL) in 1995 as a competitor to the Championship Auto Racing Teams (CART).

== Race broadcasters ==
=== Current ===
- Fox: 1999, 2025–present
- FS1: 2025–present (practice/qualifying only)
- FS2: 2025–present (practice/qualifying only)

=== Former ===
- ABC: 1996–2014
- CBS: 1997–1998
- NBC: 2018–2024
- ESPN: 2000–2008
- ESPN2: 1997, 2008
- ESPN Classic:
- USA: 2020, 2022–2024
- Versus/NBCSN: 2009–2021
- CNBC: 2015–2016, 2018
- TNN: 1998
- Fox Sports Net: 1999
- Peacock: 2022–2024

== History ==
=== 1996–1999: A variety of partners ===
For the inaugural season of the IRL championship, which consisted of only three races, all events were telecast by ABC Sports. For the series' second season, spanning 1996 and 1997, a single race―TBA―was picked up for broadcast by CBS Sports.

On March 27, 1997, a new television contract was announced for the 1998 season. ABC retained the rights to broadcast four events, including the Indianapolis 500, with ancillary programming surrounding the marquee race airing on ESPN. CBS also returned as a broadcaster for three other events. A new addition for the season was CBS' cable partner The Nashville Network (TNN; now Paramount Network), which would broadcast three races. This new arrangement would last only a single season, with IRL announcing a new agreement for 1999. For the following season, IRL announced another new contract. The sanctioning body revealed on December 23, 1998, that it had struck a deal with Fox Sports to become a major television partner. For the 1999 season, Fox broadcast nine out of eleven events, with a majority of races on the regional sports network system Fox Sports Net. ABC Sports retained rights to air just two races–the Indianapolis 500 and the race at Walt Disney World Speedway. A television contract for qualifying at the series races, excluding the 500, was carved out for Speedvision, which also aired the ill-fated Charlotte race.

=== 2000–2008: Settling with ABC/ESPN ===
With the first four years of IRL marked by changing television partners, the series made the decision to settle down with a primary partner. Beginning with the 2000 season, the league signed a multi-year deal with ABC and ESPN. The contract, worth $13 million annually over five years, covered ten races, split between the broadcast and cable network. The relationship between IRL and ABC/ESPN was deepened in 2001, when the two sides agreed to extend their deal through the 2007 season. A key aspect to this extension was an exclusive sporting relationship between the two, locking CART out of a broadcasting relationship with ABC/ESPN.

=== 2009–2014: A split contract ===
In August 2008, a now-unified IndyCar Series announced two separate television deals worth $10.9 million annually for the 2009 season. ABC renewed with a deal significantly smaller than its previous arrangement. The broadcast network would only air five races per season, including the 500, under a $4.2 million per year, three-year deal. Meanwhile, burgeoning cable sports network Versus signed a ten-year deal to cover thirteen races annually from the series through the 2018 season. ABC later renewed their deal to broadcast the 500 plus four other races through 2019, coinciding with the end of the Versus contract. In 2011, Comcast, owner of Versus, purchased a majority stake in NBCUniversal, completing a full acquisition in 2013. As a result, in 2012, Versus was folded into NBC Sports and rebranded as NBC Sports Network (NBCSN).

=== 2015–2024: Exclusivity with NBC ===
As ABC/ESPN and NBCSN's respective deals neared expiring after the 2018 season, both networks were considered front runners for deals to exclusively televise the series from 2019 onward. According to sources, each network offered the series a significant jump in races on over-the-air television, with ABC offering ten races annually and NBC eight. On March 21, 2018, IndyCar and NBC Sports announced a three-year deal to become the exclusive rightsholder to races through the 2021 season. As per reports, at least eight races were slated to air on NBC, with the others remaining on NBCSN. Practice and qualifying sessions became part of a seasonal package on NBC Sports Gold. The deal ended ABC's coverage of the Indianapolis 500 after 50-plus years.

NBC Sports renewed its exclusive television deal on July 20, 2021. A few aspects changed in the new contract. The majority of the series races would now be broadcast on NBC (13 in 2022). In a series' first, up to two races per season would be aired on NBCUniversal's new subscription streaming service Peacock, in addition to practice and qualifying sessions. USA Network would also become NBC's new cable outlet, following the shuttering of NBCSN at the end of 2021, airing all races not on NBC or Peacock.

=== 2025–present: New contract with Fox ===
On February 14, 2024, Racer reported that Fox Sports was preparing to make a serious bid for the series' television rights for the 2025 season and beyond. However, on April 5, it was reported that both Fox and NBC were in frontrunner positions for a new television contract. IndyCar announced a multi-year television contract with Fox Sports on June 12, 2025. Under this new contract, all seventeen points races will be broadcast on the main Fox network. Additionally, two sessions of time trials for the Indianapolis 500 will be televised on Fox, bringing the total annual windows on the network to nineteen. All other practice and qualifying coverage will air on a combination of FS1 and FS2, as will races from the Indy NXT series.

== Races televised ==
=== 1996 ===
Date	Event (track)	Network	Commentary		Pit reporters
Date	Event (track)	Network	Lap-by-lap	Color	Pit reporters
January 27	Indy 200 (Walt Disney World)	ABC	Paul Page	Danny Sullivan; Bobby Unser	Jack Arute; Gary Gerould
March 24	Dura Lube 200 (Phoenix)	ABC	Paul Page	Danny Sullivan; Bobby Unser	Jack Arute; Gary Gerould
May 26	Indianapolis 500	ABC	Paul Page	Danny Sullivan; Bobby Unser	Jack Arute; Gary Gerould; Jerry Punch

=== 1996–97 ===
Date	Event (track)	Network	Commentary		Pit reporters
Date	Event (track)	Network	Lap-by-lap	Color	Pit reporters
August 18	True Value 200 (New Hampshire)	ABC	Paul Page	Bobby Unser	Jack Arute; Gary Gerould
September 15	Las Vegas 500K	ABC	Paul Page	Danny Sullivan; Bobby Unser	Jack Arute; Gary Gerould
January 25	Indy 200 (Walt Disney World)	ABC	Paul Page	Bobby Unser	Jack Arute; Gary Gerould
March 23	Phoenix 200	ABC	Paul Page	Tom Sneva	Jack Arute; Gary Gerould
May 25–27	81st Indianapolis 500	ABC	Paul Page	Tom Sneva; Danny Sullivan; Bobby Unser	Jack Arute; Gary Gerould; Jerry Punch
June 7	True Value 500 (Texas)	ESPN2	Paul Page	Jon Beekhuis	Jerry Punch; Marty Reid
June 29	Samsonite 200 (Pikes Peak)	ABC	Paul Page	Tom Sneva	Jack Arute; Jon Beekhuis
July 26	VisionAire 500 (Charlotte)	CBS	Mike Joy	Scott Sharp	Brian Hammons; Mike King
August 17	Pennzoil 200 (New Hampshire)	ABC	Paul Page	Tom Sneva	Jack Arute; Jon Beekhuis
October 11	Las Vegas 500K	ABC	Paul Page	Tom Sneva	Jon Beekhuis; Gary Gerould

=== 1998 ===
Date	Event (track)	Network	Commentary		Pit reporters
Date	Event (track)	Network	Lap-by-lap	Color	Pit reporters
January 24	Indy 200 (Walt Disney World)	ABC	Paul Page	Tom Sneva	Jack Arute; Gary Gerould
March 22	Dura Lube 200 (Phoenix)	ABC	Paul Page	Tom Sneva	Jack Arute; Gary Gerould
May 24	82nd Indianapolis 500	ABC	Paul Page	Tom Sneva	Jack Arute; Gary Gerould; Jerry Punch
June 6	True Value 500 (Texas)	TNN	Mike Joy	Tom Sneva	Ralph Sheheen; Vince Welch
June 28	New England 200 (New Hampshire)	CBS	Mike Joy	Tom Sneva	Dick Berggren; Ralph Sheheen
July 19	Pep Boys 400K (Dover)	CBS	Mike Joy	Tom Sneva	Dick Berggren; Ralph Sheheen
July 25	VisionAire 500K (Charlotte)	TNN	Eli Gold	Tom Sneva	Bobby Gerould; Vince Welch
August 16	Radisson 200 (Pikes Peak)	ABC	Paul Page	Mike Groff	Jack Arute; Jon Beekhuis
August 29	Atlanta 500 Classic	TNN	Mike Joy	Tom Sneva	Ralph Sheheen; Vince Welch
September 20	Lone Star 500 (Texas)	ABC	Paul Page	Mike Groff	Jon Beekhuis; Gary Gerould
October 11	Las Vegas 500K	TNN	Mike Joy	Tom Sneva	Ralph Sheheen; Vince Welch

=== 1999 ===
Date	Event (track)	Network	Commentary		Pit reporters
Date	Event (track)	Network	Lap-by-lap	Color	Pit reporters
January 24	TransWorld Diversified Services Indy 200 (Walt Disney World)	ABC	Paul Page	Tom Sneva	Jack Arute; Gary Gerould
March 28	MCI WorldCom 200 (Phoenix)	FSN	Dave Calabro	Jack Arute; Arie Luyendyk	Calvin Fish; Vince Welch
May 1	VisionAire 500K (Charlotte)	Speedvision	Dave Calabro	Jack Arute; Arie Luyendyk	Calvin Fish; Vince Welch
May 30	83rd Indianapolis 500	ABC	Bob Jenkins	Tom Sneva	Jon Beekhuis; Gary Gerould; Jerry Punch
June 12	Longhorn 500 (Texas)	FSN	Dave Calabro	Jack Arute; Arie Luyendyk	Calvin Fish; Vince Welch
June 27	Radisson 200 (Pikes Peak)	FSN	Dave Calabro	Jack Arute; Arie Luyendyk	Calvin Fish; Vince Welch
July 1	Kobalt Mechanics Tools 500 (Atlanta)	FSN	Dave Calabro	Jack Arute; Arie Luyendyk	Calvin Fish; Vince Welch
August 1	MBNA Mid-Atlantic 200 (Dover)	Fox	Jack Arute	Vince Welch; Arie Luyendyk	Calvin Fish; Steve Roggie
August 29	Colorado Indy 200 (Pikes Peak)	FSN	Dave Calabro	Jack Arute; Arie Luyendyk	Calvin Fish; Vince Welch
September 26	Vegas.com 500	ESPN2	Bob Jenkins	Arie Luyendyk	Jack Arute; Vince Welch
October 17	Mall.com 500 (Texas)	ABC; ESPN2	Jack Arute	Arie Luyendyk	Marty Reid; Vince Welch

=== 2000 ===
Date	Event (track)	Network	Commentary		Pit reporters
Date	Event (track)	Network	Lap-by-lap	Color	Pit reporters
January 29	Delphi Indy 200 (Walt Disney World)	ABC	Bob Jenkins	Tom Sneva	Jack Arute; Vince Welch
March 19	MCI WorldCom Indy 200 (Phoenix)	ABC	Bob Jenkins	Tom Sneva	Jack Arute; Vince Welch
April 22	Vegas Indy 300 (Las Vegas)	ABC	Bob Jenkins	Tom Sneva	Jack Arute; Vince Welch
May 28	84th Indianapolis 500	ABC	Bob Jenkins	Tom Sneva; Arie Luyendyk	Jack Arute; Leslie Gudel; Jerry Punch; Vince Welch
June 11	Casino Magic 500 (Texas)	ESPN2	Bob Jenkins	Tom Sneva	Jack Arute; Vince Welch
June 18	Radisson 200 (Pikes Peak)	ABC	Bob Jenkins	Tom Sneva	Jack Arute; Vince Welch
July 15	Midas 500 Classic (Atlanta)	ESPN	Bob Jenkins	Tom Sneva	Jack Arute; Vince Welch
August 27	Belterra Resort Indy 300 (Kentucky)	ESPN	Bob Jenkins	Tom Sneva	Jack Arute; Vince Welch
October 15	Excite 500 (Texas)	ABC	Bob Jenkins	Tom Sneva	Jack Arute; Vince Welch

=== 2001 ===
Date	Event (track)	Network	Commentary		Pit reporters
Date	Event (track)	Network	Lap-by-lap	Color	Pit reporters
March 18	Pennzoil Copper World Indy 200 (Phoenix)	ABC	Bob Jenkins	Larry Rice; Jason Priestley	Jack Arute; Vince Welch
April 8	Infiniti Grand Prix of Miami (Homestead)	ABC	Bob Jenkins	Larry Rice; Jason Priestley	Jack Arute; Vince Welch
April 28	zMax 500 (Atlanta)	ESPN2	Bob Jenkins	Larry Rice; Jason Priestley	Jack Arute; Vince Welch
May 27	85th Indianapolis 500	ABC	Bob Jenkins	Larry Rice; Jason Priestley	Jack Arute; Leslie Gudel; Jerry Punch; Vince Welch
June 9	Casino Magic 500 (Texas)	ESPN	Bob Jenkins	Larry Rice; Jason Priestley	Jack Arute; Vince Welch
June 17	Radisson Indy 200 (Pikes Peak)	ABC	Bob Jenkins	Larry Rice; Jason Priestley	Jack Arute; Vince Welch
June 30	SunTrust Indy Challenge (Richmond)	ESPN	Bob Jenkins	Larry Rice; Jason Priestley	Jack Arute; Vince Welch
July 8	Ameristar Casino Indy 200 (Kansas)	ABC	Bob Jenkins	Larry Rice; Jason Priestley	Jack Arute; Vince Welch
July 21	Harrah's 200 (Nashville)	ESPN	Bob Jenkins	Larry Rice; Jason Priestley	Vince Welch
August 12	Belterra Resort Indy 300 (Kentucky)	ABC	Bob Jenkins	Larry Rice; Jason Priestley	Vince Welch
August 26	Gateway Indy 250	ESPN	Bob Jenkins	Larry Rice; Jason Priestley	Vince Welch
September 2	Delphi Indy 300 (Chicagoland)	ABC	Bob Jenkins	Larry Rice; Jason Priestley	Vince Welch
October 6	Chevy 500 (Texas)	ESPN2	Bob Jenkins	Larry Rice; Jason Priestley	Jerry Punch; Vince Welch

=== 2002 ===
Date	Event (track)	Network	Commentary		Pit reporters
Date	Event (track)	Network	Lap-by-lap	Color	Pit reporters
March 2	Grand Prix of Miami (Homestead)	ABC	Paul Page	Scott Goodyear	Jack Arute; Gary Gerould
March 17	Bombardier ATV Copper World 200 (Phoenix)	ABC	Paul Page	Scott Goodyear	Jack Arute; Gary Gerould
March 24	Yamaha Indy 400 (California)	ESPN	Paul Page	Scott Goodyear	Jack Arute; Gary Gerould; Vince Welch
April 21	Firestone Indy 225 (Nazareth)	ABC	Paul Page	Scott Goodyear	Jack Arute; Gary Gerould
May 26	86th Indianapolis 500	ABC	Paul Page	Scott Goodyear	Jack Arute; Gary Gerould; Jerry Punch; Vince Welch
June 8	Boomtown 500 (Texas)	ESPN	Paul Page	Scott Goodyear	Jack Arute; Gary Gerould
June 16	Radisson Indy 225 (Pikes Peak)	ABC	Paul Page	Scott Goodyear	Jack Arute; Gary Gerould
June 29	SunTrust Indy Challenge (Richmond)	ESPN	Paul Page	Scott Goodyear	Jack Arute; Gary Gerould
July 7	Ameristar Casino Indy 200 (Kansas)	ABC	Paul Page	Scott Goodyear	Jack Arute; Gary Gerould
July 20	Firestone Indy 200 (Nashville)	ESPN2	Paul Page	Scott Goodyear	Jack Arute; Gary Gerould
July 28	Michigan Indy 400	ABC	Paul Page	Scott Goodyear	Jack Arute; Gary Gerould; Vince Welch
August 11	Belterra Casino Indy 300 (Kentucky)	ABC	Paul Page	Scott Goodyear	Jack Arute; Gary Gerould
August 25	Gateway Indy 250	ESPN	Paul Page	Scott Goodyear	Jack Arute; Gary Gerould
September 8	Delphi Indy 300 (Chicagoland)	ABC	Paul Page	Scott Goodyear	Jack Arute; Gary Gerould
September 15	Chevy 500 (Texas)	ABC	Paul Page	Scott Goodyear	Jack Arute; Gary Gerould; Vince Welch

=== 2003 ===
Date	Event (track)	Network	Commentary		Pit reporters
Date	Event (track)	Network	Lap-by-lap	Color	Pit reporters
March 2	Toyota Indy 300 (Homestead)	ABC	Paul Page	Scott Goodyear	Jack Arute; Gary Gerould
March 23	Purex Dial Indy 200 (Phoenix)	ABC	Paul Page	Scott Goodyear	Jack Arute; Gary Gerould
April 13	Indy Japan 300 (Motegi)	ABC	Paul Page	Scott Goodyear	Jack Arute
May 25	87th Indianapolis 500	ABC	Paul Page	Scott Goodyear	Jack Arute; Gary Gerould; Jerry Punch; Vince Welch
June 7	Bombardier 500 (Texas)	ESPN	Paul Page	Scott Goodyear	Jack Arute; Gary Gerould; Jerry Punch
June 15	Honda Indy 225 (Pikes Peak)	ABC	Paul Page	Scott Goodyear	Jack Arute; Gary Gerould
June 28	SunTrust Indy Challenge (Richmond)	ESPN	Paul Page	Scott Goodyear	Jack Arute; Gary Gerould
July 6	Kansas Indy 300	ABC	Paul Page	Scott Goodyear	Jack Arute; Gary Gerould
July 19	Firestone Indy 200 (Nashville)	ESPN2	Paul Page	Scott Goodyear	Jack Arute; Gary Gerould
July 27	Firestone Indy 400 (Michigan)	ABC	Paul Page	Scott Goodyear	Jack Arute; Gary Gerould; Jerry Punch
August 10	Emerson Indy 250 (Gateway)	ABC	Paul Page	Scott Goodyear	Jack Arute; Gary Gerould
August 17	Belterra Casino Indy 300 (Kentucky)	ABC	Paul Page	Scott Goodyear	Jack Arute; Gary Gerould
August 24	Firestone Indy 225 (Nazareth)	ESPN	Paul Page	Scott Goodyear	Jack Arute; Gary Gerould
September 7	Delphi Indy 300 (Chicagoland)	ABC	Paul Page	Scott Goodyear	Jack Arute; Gary Gerould
September 21	Toyota Indy 400 (California)	ABC	Paul Page	Scott Goodyear	Jack Arute; Gary Gerould; Jerry Punch
October 12	Chevy 500 (Texas)	ESPN	Paul Page	Scott Goodyear	Jack Arute; Gary Gerould; Jerry Punch

=== 2004 ===
Date	Event (track)	Network	Commentary		Pit reporters
Date	Event (track)	Network	Lap-by-lap	Color	Pit reporters
February 29	Toyota Indy 300 (Homestead)	ESPN	Paul Page	Scott Goodyear	Jack Arute; Jamie Little; Jerry Punch
March 21	Copper World Indy 200 (Phoenix)	ABC	Paul Page	Scott Goodyear	Jack Arute; Vince Welch
April 17	Indy Japan 300 (Motegi)	ESPN2	Paul Page	Scott Goodyear	Jack Arute
May 30	88th Indianapolis 500	ABC	Paul Page	Scott Goodyear; Jack Arute	Gary Gerould; Todd Harris; Jamie Little; Jerry Punch; Vince Welch
June 12	Bombardier 500 (Texas)	ESPN	Paul Page	Scott Goodyear; Gil de Ferran	Jack Arute; Jamie Little; Jerry Punch
June 26	SunTrust Indy Challenge (Richmond)	ESPN2	Paul Page	Scott Goodyear	Jack Arute; Jamie Little; Jerry Punch
July 4	Argent Mortgage 300 (Kansas)	ABC	Paul Page	Scott Goodyear; Jack Arute	Todd Harris; Jerry Punch
July 17	Firestone Indy 200 (Nashville)	ESPN	Paul Page	Scott Goodyear	Jack Arute; Jamie Little; Jerry Punch
July 25	Menards A.J. Foyt 225 (Milwaukee)	ABC	Paul Page	Scott Goodyear; Jack Arute	Todd Harris; Jerry Punch
August 1	Michigan Indy 400	ABC	Paul Page	Scott Goodyear; Jack Arute	Todd Harris; Jamie Little; Jerry Punch
August 15	Belterra Casino Indy 300 (Kentucky)	ABC	Paul Page	Scott Goodyear; Jack Arute	Todd Harris; Jerry Punch
August 22	Honda Indy 225 (Pikes Peak)	ABC	Paul Page	Scott Goodyear; Jack Arute	Todd Harris; Jerry Punch
August 29	Firestone Indy 225 (Nazareth)	ABC	Paul Page	Scott Goodyear; Jack Arute	Todd Harris; Jerry Punch
September 12	Delphi Indy 300 (Chicagoland)	ABC	Paul Page	Scott Goodyear; Jack Arute	Todd Harris; Jamie Little; Jerry Punch
October 3	Toyota Indy 400 (California)	ESPN	Paul Page	Scott Goodyear; Gil de Ferran	Jack Arute; Gary Gerould; Jamie Little
October 17	Chevy 500 (Texas)	ABC	Paul Page	Scott Goodyear; Jack Arute	Todd Harris; Jamie Little; Darren Manning; Jerry Punch

=== 2005 ===
Date	Event (track)	Network	Commentary		Pit reporters
Date	Event (track)	Network	Lap-by-lap	Color	Pit reporters
March 6	Toyota Indy 300 (Homestead)	ESPN	Todd Harris	Scott Goodyear; Gil de Ferran	Jamie Little; Jerry Punch; Vince Welch
March 6	Toyota Indy 300 (Homestead)	ESPN2	Gary Gerould	Jaques Lazier	Jamie Little; Jerry Punch; Vince Welch
March 19	XM Satellite Radio Indy 200 (Phoenix)	ABC	Todd Harris	Scott Goodyear; Gil de Ferran	Jack Arute; Jamie Little; Jerry Punch
April 3	Honda Grand Prix (St. Petersburg)	ESPN	Todd Harris	Scott Goodyear; Gil de Ferran	Jamie Little; Jerry Punch; Vince Welch
April 30	Indy Japan 300 (Motegi)	ESPN	Todd Harris	Scott Goodyear	Jerry Punch
May 29	89th Indianapolis 500	ABC	Todd Harris	Scott Goodyear	Jack Arute; Jamie Little; Jerry Punch; Vince Welch
June 11	Bombardier Learjet 500 (Texas)	ESPN	Todd Harris	Scott Goodyear	Jamie Little; Jerry Punch; Vince Welch
June 25	SunTrust Indy Challenge (Richmond)	ESPN2	Todd Harris	Scott Goodyear	Jamie Little; Jerry Punch; Vince Welch
July 3	Argent Mortgage Indy 300 (Kansas)	ESPN	Todd Harris	Scott Goodyear	Jamie Little; Jerry Punch; Vince Welch
July 16	Firestone Indy 200 (Nashville)	ESPN	Todd Harris	Scott Goodyear	Jamie Little; Jerry Punch; Vince Welch
July 24	ABC Supply Company A.J. Foyt 225 (Milwaukee)	ESPN	Todd Harris	Scott Goodyear	Jamie Little; Jerry Punch; Vince Welch
July 31	Firestone Indy 400 (Michigan)	ABC	Todd Harris	Scott Goodyear	Jack Arute; Jamie Little; Jerry Punch
August 14	AMBER Alert Portal Indy 300 (Kentucky)	ABC	Todd Harris	Scott Goodyear	Jack Arute; Jamie Little; Jerry Punch
August 21	Honda Indy 225 (Pikes Peak)	ABC	Todd Harris	Scott Goodyear	Jack Arute; Jamie Little; Jerry Punch
August 28	Argent Mortgage Indy Grand Prix (Sonoma)	ESPN	Todd Harris	Scott Goodyear	Jack Arute; Jamie Little; Jerry Punch
September 11	Peak Antifreeze Indy 300 (Chicagoland)	ABC	Todd Harris	Scott Goodyear	Jamie Little; Jerry Punch
September 25	Watkins Glen Indy Grand Prix	ABC	Todd Harris	Scott Goodyear	Jamie Little; Jerry Punch; Vince Welch
October 16	Toyota Indy 400 (California)	ESPN	Todd Harris	Scott Goodyear	Jamie Little; Jerry Punch; Vince Welch

=== 2006 ===
Date	Event (track)	Network	Commentary		Pit reporters
Date	Event (track)	Network	Lap-by-lap	Color	Pit reporters
March 26	Toyota Indy 300 (Homestead)	ABC	Marty Reid	Scott Goodyear; Rusty Wallace	Jack Arute; Jamie Little; Jerry Punch
April 2	Honda Grand Prix of St. Petersburg	ESPN	Marty Reid	Scott Goodyear; Rusty Wallace	Jack Arute; Jamie Little; Jerry Punch
April 22	Indy Japan 300 (Motegi)	ESPN	Marty Reid	Scott Goodyear; Rusty Wallace	Jerry Punch
May 28	90th Indianapolis 500	ABC	Marty Reid	Scott Goodyear; Rusty Wallace	Jack Arute; Jamie Little; Jerry Punch; Vince Welch
June 4	Watkins Glen Indy Grand Prix	ABC	Marty Reid	Scott Goodyear; Rusty Wallace	Jack Arute; Jamie Little; Jerry Punch
June 10	Bombardier Learjet 500 (Texas)	ESPN	Marty Reid	Scott Goodyear; Rusty Wallace	Jack Arute; Jamie Little; Jerry Punch
June 24	SunTrust Indy Challenge (Richmond)	ESPN2	Marty Reid	Scott Goodyear; Rusty Wallace	Jack Arute; Jamie Little; Jerry Punch
July 2	Kansas Lottery Indy 300 (Kansas)	ABC	Marty Reid	Scott Goodyear; Rusty Wallace	Jack Arute; Jamie Little; Jerry Punch
July 15	Firestone Indy 200 (Nashville)	ESPN	Marty Reid	Scott Goodyear; Rusty Wallace	Jack Arute; Jamie Little; Jerry Punch
July 23	ABC Supply Company A.J. Foyt 225 (Milwaukee)	ESPN	Marty Reid	Scott Goodyear; Rusty Wallace	Jack Arute; Jamie Little; Jerry Punch
July 30	Firestone Indy 400 (Michigan)	ABC; ESPN2	Marty Reid	Scott Goodyear; Rusty Wallace	Jack Arute; Jamie Little; Jerry Punch
August 13	Meijer Indy 300 (Kentucky)	ABC	Marty Reid	Scott Goodyear; Rusty Wallace	Jack Arute; Jamie Little; Jerry Punch
August 27	Indy Grand Prix of Sonoma	ESPN	Marty Reid	Scott Goodyear; Rusty Wallace	Jack Arute; Jamie Little; Jerry Punch
September 10	Peak Antifreeze Indy 300 (Chicagoland)	ABC	Marty Reid	Scott Goodyear; Rusty Wallace	Jack Arute; Jamie Little; Vince Welch

=== 2007 ===
Date	Event (track)	Network	Commentary		Pit reporters
Date	Event (track)	Network	Lap-by-lap	Color	Pit reporters
March 24	XM Satellite Radio Indy 300 (Homestead)	ESPN2	Marty Reid	Scott Goodyear	Jack Arute; Brienne Pedigo; Vince Welch
April 1	Honda Grand Prix of St. Petersburg	ESPN	Marty Reid	Scott Goodyear	Jack Arute; Brienne Pedigo; Vince Welch
April 21	Indy Japan 300 (Motegi)	ESPN	Marty Reid	Scott Goodyear	Jack Arute
April 29	Kansas Lottery Indy 300	ESPN2	Marty Reid	Scott Goodyear	Jack Arute; Brienne Pedigo; Vince Welch
May 27	91st Indianapolis 500	ABC	Marty Reid	Scott Goodyear; Rusty Wallace	Jack Arute; Brienne Pedigo; Jamie Little; Vince Welch
June 3	ABC Supply Company A.J. Foyt 225 (Milwaukee)	ABC	Marty Reid	Scott Goodyear	Jack Arute; Brienne Pedigo; Vince Welch
June 9	Bombardier Learjet 550 (Texas)	ESPN2	Marty Reid	Scott Goodyear	Jack Arute; Brienne Pedigo; Vince Welch
June 24	Iowa Corn Indy 250	ABC	Marty Reid	Scott Goodyear	Jack Arute; Brienne Pedigo; Vince Welch
June 30	SunTrust Indy Challenge (Richmond)	ESPN	Marty Reid	Scott Goodyear	Jack Arute; Brienne Pedigo; Vince Welch
July 8	Camping World Grand Prix (Watkins Glen)	ABC	Marty Reid	Scott Goodyear	Jack Arute; Brienne Pedigo; Vince Welch
July 15	Firestone Indy 200 (Nashville)	ESPN2	Marty Reid	Scott Goodyear	Jack Arute; Brienne Pedigo; Vince Welch
July 22	Honda 200 (Mid-Ohio)	ESPN; ABC	Marty Reid	Scott Goodyear	Jack Arute; Brienne Pedigo; Vince Welch
August 5	Firestone Indy 400 (Michigan)	ESPN Classic	Marty Reid	Scott Goodyear	Jack Arute; Brienne Pedigo
August 11	Meijer Indy 300 (Kentucky)	ESPN2	Marty Reid	Scott Goodyear	Jack Arute; Brienne Pedigo; Vince Welch
August 26	Motorola Indy 300 (Sonoma)	ESPN	Marty Reid	Scott Goodyear	Jack Arute; Brienne Pedigo; Vince Welch
September 2	Detroit Indy Grand Prix	ABC	Marty Reid	Scott Goodyear	Jack Arute; Brienne Pedigo; Vince Welch
September 9	Peak Antifreeze Indy 300 (Chicagoland)	ABC	Marty Reid	Scott Goodyear	Jack Arute; Brienne Pedigo; Vince Welch

=== 2008 ===
Date	Event (track)	Network	Commentary		Pit reporters
Date	Event (track)	Network	Lap-by-lap	Color	Pit reporters
March 29	GAINSCO Auto Insurance Indy 300 (Homestead)	ESPN2	Marty Reid	Scott Goodyear	Jack Arute; Brienne Pedigo; Vince Welch
April 6	Honda Grand Prix of St. Petersburg	ESPN	Marty Reid	Scott Goodyear	Jack Arute; Brienne Pedigo; Vince Welch
April 20	Indy Japan 300 (Motegi)	ESPN	Marty Reid	Scott Goodyear	Jack Arute
April 20	Toyota Grand Prix of Long Beach	ESPN2	Marty Reid	Scott Goodyear	Jack Arute; Jamie Little; Brienne Pedigo
April 27	RoadRunner Turbo Indy 300 (Kansas)	ESPN Classic; ESPN2	Marty Reid	Scott Goodyear	Jack Arute; Brienne Pedigo; Vince Welch
May 25	92nd Indianapolis 500	ABC	Marty Reid	Scott Goodyear; Eddie Cheever	Jack Arute; Jamie Little; Brienne Pedigo; Vince Welch
June 1	ABC Supply Company A.J. Foyt 225 (Milwaukee)	ABC	Marty Reid	Scott Goodyear	Jack Arute; Brienne Pedigo; Vince Welch
June 7	Bombardier Learjet 550 (Texas)	ESPN2	Marty Reid	Scott Goodyear	Jack Arute; Brienne Pedigo; Vince Welch
June 22	Iowa Corn Indy 250	ABC	Marty Reid	Scott Goodyear	Jack Arute; Brienne Pedigo; Vince Welch
June 28	SunTrust Indy Challenge (Richmond)	ESPN	Marty Reid	Scott Goodyear	Jack Arute; Brienne Pedigo; Vince Welch
July 6	Camping World Indy Grand Prix (Watkins Glen)	ABC	Marty Reid	Scott Goodyear	Jack Arute; Brienne Pedigo; Vince Welch
July 12	Firestone Indy 200 (Nashville)	ESPN	Marty Reid	Scott Goodyear	Jack Arute; Brienne Pedigo; Vince Welch
July 20	Honda 200 (Mid-Ohio)	ABC	Marty Reid	Scott Goodyear	Jack Arute; Brienne Pedigo; Vince Welch
July 26	Rexall Edmonton Indy	ESPN	Bob Jenkins	Scott Goodyear	Jon Beekhuis; Brienne Pedigo
August 9	Meijer Indy 300 (Kentucky)	ESPN2	Marty Reid	Scott Goodyear	Jack Arute; Brienne Pedigo; Vince Welch
August 24	Peak Antifreeze Indy Grand Prix (Sonoma)	ESPN2	Marty Reid	Scott Goodyear	Jack Arute; Brienne Pedigo; Vince Welch
August 31	Detroit Indy Grand Prix	ABC	Marty Reid	Scott Goodyear	Jack Arute; Brienne Pedigo; Vince Welch
September 7	Peak Antifreeze Indy 300 (Chicagoland)	ABC	Marty Reid	Scott Goodyear	Jack Arute; Brienne Pedigo; Vince Welch
October 26	Nikon Indy 300 (Surfers Paradise)	ESPN	Bob Jenkins	Scott Goodyear	Jon Beekhuis

=== 2009 ===
Date	Event (track)	Network	Commentary		Pit reporters
Date	Event (track)	Network	Lap-by-lap	Color	Pit reporters
April 5	Honda Grand Prix of St. Petersburg	Versus	Bob Jenkins	Robbie Buhl; Jon Beekhuis	Jack Arute; Robbie Floyd; Lindy Thackston
April 19	Toyota Grand Prix of Long Beach	Versus	Bob Jenkins	Robbie Buhl; Jon Beekhuis	Jack Arute; Robbie Floyd; Lindy Thackston
April 26	RoadRunner Turbo Indy 300 (Kansas)	Versus	Bob Jenkins	Robbie Buhl; Jon Beekhuis	Jack Arute; Robbie Floyd; Lindy Thackston
May 24	93rd Indianapolis 500	ABC	Marty Reid	Scott Goodyear; Eddie Cheever	Jack Arute; Jamie Little; Brienne Pedigo; Vince Welch
May 31	ABC Supply Company A.J. Foyt 225 (Milwaukee)	ABC	Marty Reid	Scott Goodyear	Jack Arute; Brienne Pedigo; Vince Welch
June 6	Bombardier Learjet 550 (Texas)	Versus	Bob Jenkins	Robbie Buhl; Jon Beekhuis	Jack Arute; Robbie Floyd; Lindy Thackston
June 21	Iowa Corn Indy 250	ABC	Marty Reid	Scott Goodyear	Jack Arute; Brienne Pedigo; Vince Welch
June 27	SunTrust Indy Challenge (Richmond)	Versus	Bob Jenkins	Robbie Buhl; Jon Beekhuis	Jack Arute; Robbie Floyd; Lindy Thackston
July 5	Camping World Grand Prix (Watkins Glen)	ABC	Marty Reid	Scott Goodyear	Jack Arute; Brienne Pedigo; Vince Welch
July 12	Honda Indy Toronto	ABC	Marty Reid	Scott Goodyear	Jack Arute; Brienne Pedigo; Vince Welch
July 26	Rexall Edmonton Indy	Versus	Bob Jenkins	Robbie Buhl; Jon Beekhuis	Robbie Floyd; Kevin Lee; Lindy Thackston
August 1	Meijer Indy 300 (Kentucky)	Versus	Bob Jenkins	Robbie Buhl; Jon Beekhuis	Robbie Floyd; Kevin Lee; Lindy Thackston
August 9	Honda Indy 200 (Mid-Ohio)	Versus	Bob Jenkins	Robbie Buhl; Jon Beekhuis	Jack Arute; Robbie Floyd; Lindy Thackston
August 23	Indy Grand Prix of Sonoma	Versus	Bob Jenkins	Robbie Buhl; Jon Beekhuis	Jack Arute; Robbie Floyd; Lindy Thackston
August 29	Peak Antifreeze & Motor Oil Indy 300 (Chicagoland)	Versus	Bob Jenkins	Robbie Buhl; Jon Beekhuis	Jack Arute; Robbie Floyd; Lindy Thackston
September 19	Indy Japan 300 (Motegi)	Versus	Bob Jenkins	Robbie Buhl; Jon Beekhuis	Jack Arute
October 10	Firestone Indy 300 (Homestead)	Versus	Bob Jenkins	Robbie Buhl; Jon Beekhuis	Jack Arute; Robbie Floyd; Lindy Thackston

=== 2010 ===
Date	Event (track)	Network	Commentary		Pit reporters
Date	Event (track)	Network	Lap-by-lap	Color	Pit reporters
March 14	São Paulo Indy 300	Versus	Bob Jenkins	Robbie Buhl; Jon Beekhuis	Jack Arute
March 29	Honda Grand Prix of St. Petersburg	ESPN2	Marty Reid	Scott Goodyear	Rick DeBruhl; Jamie Little; Vince Welch
April 11	Indy Grand Prix of Alabama (Barber)	Versus	Bob Jenkins	Robbie Buhl; Jon Beekhuis	Jack Arute; Robbie Floyd; Lindy Thackston
April 18	Toyota Grand Prix of Long Beach	Versus	Bob Jenkins	Robbie Buhl; Jon Beekhuis	Jack Arute; Robbie Floyd; Lindy Thackston
May 1	RoadRunner Turbo Indy 300 (Kansas)	ABC	Marty Reid	Scott Goodyear	Rick DeBruhl; Jamie Little; Vince Welch
May 30	94th Indianapolis 500	ABC	Marty Reid	Scott Goodyear; Eddie Cheever	Rick DeBruhl; Jamie Little; Jerry Punch; Vince Welch
June 5	Firestone 550 (Texas)	Versus	Bob Jenkins	Robbie Buhl; Jon Beekhuis	Jack Arute; Robbie Floyd; Lindy Thackston
June 20	Iowa Corn Indy 250	Versus	Bob Jenkins	Robbie Buhl; Jon Beekhuis	Jack Arute; Robbie Floyd; Lindy Thackston
July 4	Camping World Grand Prix (Watkins Glen)	ABC	Marty Reid	Scott Goodyear	Rick DeBruhl; Jamie Little; Vince Welch
July 18	Honda Indy Toronto	ABC	Marty Reid	Scott Goodyear	Rick DeBruhl; Jamie Little; Vince Welch
July 25	Honda Indy Edmonton	Versus	Bob Jenkins	Robbie Buhl; Jon Beekhuis	Jack Arute; Robbie Floyd; Lindy Thackston
August 8	Honda Indy 200 (Mid-Ohio)	Versus	Bob Jenkins	Robbie Buhl; Jon Beekhuis	Jack Arute; Robbie Floyd; Lindy Thackston
August 22	Indy Grand Prix of Sonoma	Versus	Bob Jenkins	Robbie Buhl; Jon Beekhuis	Jack Arute; Robbie Floyd; Lindy Thackston
August 28	Peak Antifreeze & Motor Oil 300 (Chicagoland)	Versus	Bob Jenkins	Robbie Buhl; Jon Beekhuis	Jack Arute; Robbie Floyd; Lindy Thackston
September 4	Kentucky Indy 300	Versus	Bob Jenkins	Robbie Buhl; Jon Beekhuis	Jack Arute; Robbie Floyd; Lindy Thackston
September 19	Indy Japan 300 (Motegi)	Versus	Bob Jenkins	Robbie Buhl; Jon Beekhuis	Jack Arute
October 2	Cafés do Brasil Indy 300 (Homestead)	Versus	Bob Jenkins	Robbie Buhl; Jon Beekhuis	Jack Arute; Robbie Floyd; Lindy Thackston

=== 2011 ===
Date	Event (track)	Network	Commentary		Pit reporters
Date	Event (track)	Network	Lap-by-lap	Color	Pit reporters
March 27	Honda Grand Prix of St. Petersburg	ABC	Marty Reid	Scott Goodyear	Rick DeBruhl; Jamie Little; Vince Welch
April 10	Indy Grand Prix of Alabama	Versus	Bob Jenkins	Wally Dallenbach Jr. Jon Beekhuis	Kevin Lee; Robin Miller; Marty Snider; Lindy Thackston
April 17	Toyota Grand Prix of Long Beach	Versus	Bob Jenkins	Wally Dallenbach Jr. Jon Beekhuis	Kevin Lee; Robin Miller; Marty Snider; Lindy Thackston
May 1	São Paulo Indy 300	Versus	Bob Jenkins	Wally Dallenbach Jr. Jon Beekhuis; Robin Miller	Kevin Lee
May 29	95th Indianapolis 500	ABC	Marty Reid	Scott Goodyear; Eddie Cheever	Rick DeBruhl; Jamie Little; Jerry Punch; Vince Welch
June 11	Firestone Twin 275s (Texas)	Versus	Bob Jenkins	Dan Wheldon; Jon Beekhuis	Robbie Floyd; Kevin Lee; Robin Miller; Lindy Thackston
June 19	Milwaukee 225	ABC	Marty Reid	Scott Goodyear	Rick DeBruhl; Jamie Little; Vince Welch
June 25	Iowa Corn Indy 250	Versus	Bob Jenkins	Dan Wheldon; Jon Beekhuis	Robbie Floyd; Kevin Lee; Robin Miller; Lindy Thackston
July 10	Honda Indy Toronto	Versus	Bob Jenkins	Wally Dallenbach Jr. Jon Beekhuis	Robbie Floyd; Kevin Lee; Robin Miller; Lindy Thackston; Dan Wheldon
July 24	Edmonton Indy	Versus	Bob Jenkins	Wally Dallenbach Jr. Jon Beekhuis	Robbie Floyd; Kevin Lee; Robin Miller; Lindy Thackston
August 7	Honda Indy 200 (Mid-Ohio)	Versus	Bob Jenkins	Wally Dallenbach Jr. Jon Beekhuis	Kevin Lee; Robin Miller; Marty Snider; Lindy Thackston
August 14	MoveThatBlock.com Indy 225 (New Hampshire)	ABC	Marty Reid	Scott Goodyear	Rick DeBruhl; Gary Gerould; Jamie Little
August 28	Indy Grand Prix of Sonoma	Versus	Bob Jenkins	Wally Dallenbach Jr. Jon Beekhuis	Kevin Lee; Robin Miller; Marty Snider; Lindy Thackston
September 4	Baltimore Grand Prix	Versus	Bob Jenkins	Wally Dallenbach Jr. Jon Beekhuis	Kevin Lee; Robin Miller; Marty Snider; Lindy Thackston
September 18	Indy Japan: The Final (Motegi)	Versus	Bob Jenkins	Wally Dallenbach Jr. Jon Beekhuis; Robin Miller	Kevin Lee
October 2	Kentucky Indy 300	Versus	Bob Jenkins	Wally Dallenbach Jr. Jon Beekhuis	Kevin Lee; Robin Miller; Marty Snider; Lindy Thackston
October 16	IZOD IndyCar World Championship (Las Vegas)	ABC	Marty Reid	Scott Goodyear; Eddie Cheever	Rick DeBruhl; Jamie Little; Vince Welch

=== 2012 ===
Date	Event (track)	Network	Commentary		Pit reporters
Date	Event (track)	Network	Lap-by-lap	Color	Pit reporters
March 25	Honda Grand Prix of St. Petersburg	ABC	Marty Reid	Scott Goodyear	Rick DeBruhl; Jamie Little; Vince Welch
April 1	Indy Grand Prix of Alabama (Barber)	NBCSN	Bob Jenkins	Wally Dallenbach Jr. Jon Beekhuis	Townsend Bell; Kevin Lee; Robin Miller; Marty Snider
April 15	Toyota Grand Prix of Long Beach	NBCSN	Bob Jenkins	Wally Dallenbach Jr. Jon Beekhuis	Townsend Bell; Kevin Lee; Robin Miller; Marty Snider
April 29	Itaipava São Paulo Indy 300	NBCSN	Bob Jenkins	Wally Dallenbach Jr. Jon Beekhuis; Robin Miller	Kevin Lee
May 27	96th Indianapolis 500	ABC	Marty Reid	Scott Goodyear; Eddie Cheever	Rick DeBruhl; Jamie Little; Jerry Punch; Vince Welch
June 3	Chevrolet Detroit Belle Isle Grand Prix	ABC	Marty Reid	Scott Goodyear	Rick DeBruhl; Jamie Little; Vince Welch
June 9	Firestone 550 (Texas)	NBCSN	Bob Jenkins	Tommy Kendall; Jon Beekhuis	Townsend Bell; Kevin Lee; Robin Miller
June 16	Milwaukee IndyFest	ABC; ESPNews	Marty Reid	Scott Goodyear	Rick DeBruhl; Jamie Little; Vince Welch
June 23	Iowa Corn Indy 250	NBCSN	Bob Jenkins	Tommy Kendall; Jon Beekhuis	Townsend Bell; Kevin Lee; Robin Miller
July 8	Honda Indy Toronto	ABC	Marty Reid	Scott Goodyear	Rick DeBruhl; Jamie Little; Vince Welch
July 22	Edmonton Indy	NBCSN	Bob Jenkins	Wally Dallenbach Jr. Jon Beekhuis	Kevin Lee; Robin Miller; Marty Snider
August 5	Honda Indy 200 (Mid-Ohio)	ABC	Bob Jenkins	Wally Dallenbach Jr. Jon Beekhuis	Townsend Bell; Kevin Lee; Marty Snider
August 26	GoPro Indy Grand Prix (Sonoma)	NBCSN	Bob Jenkins	Wally Dallenbach Jr. Jon Beekhuis	Townsend Bell; Kevin Lee; Robin Miller; Marty Snider
September 2	Grand Prix of Baltimore	NBCSN	Brian Till	Wally Dallenbach Jr. Jon Beekhuis	Townsend Bell; Kevin Lee; Robin Miller; Marty Snider
September 15	MAVTV 500 IndyCar World Championships (California)	NBCSN	Bob Jenkins	Wally Dallenbach Jr. Jon Beekhuis	Kevin Lee; Robin Miller; Chris Neville; Marty Snider

=== 2013 ===
Date	Event (track)	Network	Commentary		Pit reporters
Date	Event (track)	Network	Lap-by-lap	Color	Pit reporters
March 24	Honda Grand Prix of St. Petersburg	NBCSN	Leigh Diffey	Townsend Bell; Wally Dallenbach Jr.	Jon Beekhuis; Kevin Lee; Robin Miller; Brian Till
April 7	Honda Indy Grand Prix of Alabama (Barber)	NBCSN	Leigh Diffey	Townsend Bell; Wally Dallenbach Jr.	Jon Beekhuis; Kevin Lee; Robin Miller; Marty Snider
April 21	Toyota Grand Prix of Long Beach	NBCSN	Brian Till	Townsend Bell; Wally Dallenbach Jr.	Jon Beekhuis; Kevin Lee; Robin Miller; Marty Snider
May 5	São Paulo Indy 300	NBCSN	Leigh Diffey	Townsend Bell; Jon Beekhuis; Robin Miller	Kevin Lee
May 26	97th Indianapolis 500	ABC	Marty Reid	Scott Goodyear; Eddie Cheever	Rick DeBruhl; Jamie Little; Jerry Punch; Vince Welch
June 1	Chevrolet Indy Dual in Detroit - Race 1	ABC	Marty Reid	Eddie Cheever; Scott Goodyear	Rick DeBruhl; Jamie Little; Vince Welch
June 2	Chevrolet Indy Dual in Detroit - Race 2	ABC	Marty Reid	Eddie Cheever; Scott Goodyear	Rick DeBruhl; Jamie Little; Vince Welch
June 8	Firestone 550 (Texas)	ABC	Marty Reid	Eddie Cheever; Scott Goodyear	Rick DeBruhl; Jamie Little; Vince Welch
June 15	Milwaukee IndyFest	NBCSN	Leigh Diffey	Townsend Bell; David Hobbs	Jon Beekhuis; Will Buxton; Kevin Lee; Robin Miller
June 23	Iowa Corn Indy 250	ABC	Marty Reid	Eddie Cheever; Scott Goodyear	Rick DeBruhl; Jamie Little; Vince Welch
July 7	Pocono IndyCar 400	ABC	Marty Reid	Eddie Cheever; Scott Goodyear	Rick DeBruhl; Jamie Little; Vince Welch
July 13	Honda Indy Toronto - Race 1	NBCSN	Leigh Diffey	Townsend Bell; Steve Matchett	Jon Beekhuis; Kevin Lee; Brian Till
July 14	Honda Indy Toronto - Race 2	NBCSN	Leigh Diffey	Townsend Bell; Steve Matchett	Jon Beekhuis; Kevin Lee; Robin Miller; Brian Till
August 4	Honda Indy 200 (Mid-Ohio)	NBCSN	Leigh Diffey	Townsend Bell; Ryan Briscoe	Jon Beekhuis; Kevin Lee; Robin Miller; Marty Snider
August 25	GoPro Indy Grand Prix (Sonoma)	NBCSN	Leigh Diffey	Townsend Bell; Wally Dallenbach Jr.	Jon Beekhuis; Kevin Lee; Robin Miller; Marty Snider
September 1	Grand Prix of Baltimore	NBCSN	Leigh Diffey	Townsend Bell; Wally Dallenbach Jr.	Jon Beekhuis; Kevin Lee; Robin Miller; Marty Snider
October 5	Shell-Pennzoil Grand Prix of Houston–Race 1	NBCSN	Leigh Diffey	Wally Dallenbach Jr. Robin Miller	Jon Beekhuis; Kevin Lee; Marty Snider
October 6	Shell-Pennzoil Grand Prix of Houston–Race 2	NBCSN	Leigh Diffey	Townsend Bell; Wally Dallenbach Jr.	Jon Beekhuis; Kevin Lee; Robin Miller; Marty Snider
October 19	MAVTV 500 IndyCar World Championships (California)	NBCSN	Leigh Diffey	Townsend Bell; Wally Dallenbach Jr.	Jon Beekhuis; Kevin Lee; Robin Miller; Marty Snider

=== 2014 ===
Date	Event (track)	Network	Commentary		Pit reporters
Date	Event (track)	Network	Lap-by-lap	Color	Pit reporters
March 30	Firestone Grand Prix of St. Petersburg	ABC	Allen Bestwick	Scott Goodyear; Eddie Cheever	Rick DeBruhl; Jamie Little; Vince Welch
April 13	Toyota Grand Prix of Long Beach	NBCSN	Leigh Diffey	Townsend Bell; Paul Tracy	Kevin Lee; Marty Snider; Kelli Stavast
April 27	Honda Indy Grand Prix of Alabama (Barber)	NBCSN	Leigh Diffey	Townsend Bell; Wally Dallenbach Jr.	Jon Beekhuis; Kevin Lee; Kelli Stavast
May 10	Grand Prix of Indianapolis	ABC	Allen Bestwick	Eddie Cheever; Scott Goodyear	Rick DeBruhl; Jamie Little; Jerry Punch; Vince Welch
May 25	98th Indianapolis 500	ABC	Allen Bestwick	Eddie Cheever; Scott Goodyear	Rick DeBruhl; Jamie Little; Jerry Punch; Vince Welch
May 31	Chevrolet Indy Dual in Detroit–Race 1	ABC	Allen Bestwick	Eddie Cheever; Scott Goodyear	Rick DeBruhl; Jamie Little; Jerry Punch
June 1	Chevrolet Indy Dual in Detroit–Race 2	ABC	Allen Bestwick	Eddie Cheever; Scott Goodyear	Rick DeBruhl; Jamie Little; Jerry Punch
June 7	Firestone 600 (Texas)	NBCSN	Brian Till	Townsend Bell; Paul Tracy	Jon Beekhuis; Kevin Lee; Kelli Stavast
June 28	Shell and Pennzoil Grand Prix of Houston–Race 1	NBCSN	Leigh Diffey	Steve Matchett; Paul Tracy	Jon Beekhuis; Kevin Lee; Robin Miller; Kelli Stavast
June 29	Shell and Pennzoil Grand Prix of Houston–Race 2	NBCSN	Leigh Diffey	Steve Matchett; Paul Tracy	Jon Beekhuis; Kevin Lee; Robin Miller; Kelli Stavast
July 6	Pocono IndyCar 500	NBCSN	Bob Varsha	Townsend Bell; Paul Tracy	Jon Beekhuis; Kevin Lee; Robin Miller; Kelli Stavast
July 12	Iowa Corn Indy 300	NBCSN	Leigh Diffey	David Hobbs; Paul Tracy	Jon Beekhuis; Kevin Lee; Robin Miller; Kelli Stavast
July 20	Honda Indy Toronto–Race 1	NBCSN	Bob Varsha	Townsend Bell; Paul Tracy	Kevin Lee; Robin Miller; Marty Snider; Kelli Stavast
July 20	Honda Indy Toronto–Race 2	NBCSN	Bob Varsha	Townsend Bell; Paul Tracy	Kevin Lee; Robin Miller; Marty Snider; Kelli Stavast
August 3	Honda Indy 200 (Mid-Ohio)	NBCSN	Leigh Diffey	David Hobbs; Townsend Bell	Kevin Lee; Robin Miller; Marty Snider; Kelli Stavast
August 17	ABC Supply Wisconsin 250 (Milwaukee)	NBCSN	Leigh Diffey	David Hobbs; Townsend Bell	Kevin Lee; Robin Miller; Marty Snider; Kelli Stavast
August 24	GoPro Indy Grand Prix (Sonoma)	NBCSN	Brian Till	Sam Hornish Jr. Paul Tracy	Kevin Lee; Robin Miller; Marty Snider; Kelli Stavast
August 30	MAVTV 500 IndyCar World Championships (California)	NBCSN	Leigh Diffey	Townsend Bell; Paul Tracy	Kevin Lee; Marty Snider; Kelli Stavast

=== 2015 ===
Date	Event (track)	Network	Commentary		Pit reporters
Date	Event (track)	Network	Lap-by-lap	Color	Pit reporters
March 29	Firestone Grand Prix of St. Petersburg	ABC	Allen Bestwick	Eddie Cheever; Scott Goodyear	Jon Beekhuis; Rick DeBruhl; Jerry Punch
April 12	Indy Grand Prix of Louisiana (NOLA)	NBCSN	Brian Till	Townsend Bell; Paul Tracy	Kevin Lee; Marty Snider; Kelli Stavast
April 19	Toyota Grand Prix of Long Beach	NBCSN	Brian Till	Townsend Bell; Paul Tracy	Kevin Lee; Marty Snider; Kelli Stavast
April 26	Honda Indy Grand Prix of Alabama (Barber)	NBCSN	Leigh Diffey	Townsend Bell; Steve Matchett	Kevin Lee; Marty Snider; Kelli Stavast
May 9	Angie's List Grand Prix of Indianapolis	ABC	Allen Bestwick	Eddie Cheever; Scott Goodyear	Jon Beekhuis; Rick DeBruhl; Jerry Punch
May 24	99th Indianapolis 500	ABC	Allen Bestwick	Eddie Cheever; Scott Goodyear	Jon Beekhuis; Rick DeBruhl; Jerry Punch
May 30	Chevrolet Detroit Belle Isle Grand Prix–Race 1	ABC	Allen Bestwick	Scott Goodyear; Eddie Cheever	Jon Beekhuis; Rick DeBruhl; Jerry Punch
May 31	Chevrolet Detroit Belle Isle Grand Prix–Race 2	ABC	Allen Bestwick	Eddie Cheever; Scott Goodyear	Jon Beekhuis; Rick DeBruhl; Jerry Punch
June 6	Firestone 600 (Texas)	NBCSN	Brian Till	Townsend Bell; Paul Tracy	Kevin Lee; Marty Snider; Kelli Stavast
June 14	Honda Indy Toronto	NBCSN	Leigh Diffey	Steve Matchett; Paul Tracy	Jon Beekhuis; Kevin Lee; Katie Hargitt; Robin Miller
June 27	MAVTV 500 (California)	NBCSN	Leigh Diffey	Steve Matchett; Paul Tracy	Jon Beekhuis; Kevin Lee; Robin Miller; Kelli Stavast
July 12	ABC Supply Wisconsin 250 (Milwaukee)	NBCSN	Leigh Diffey	Townsend Bell; Paul Tracy	Jon Beekhuis; Katie Hargitt; Kevin Lee; Robin Miller
July 18	Iowa Corn 300	NBCSN	Leigh Diffey	Townsend Bell; Paul Tracy	Jon Beekhuis; Katie Hargitt; Kevin Lee; Robin Miller
August 2	Honda Indy 200 (Mid-Ohio)	NBCSN	Leigh Diffey	Townsend Bell; David Hobbs	Jon Beekhuis; Katie Hargitt; Kevin Lee; Robin Miller
August 23	ABC Supply 500 (Pocono)	NBCSN	Leigh Diffey	Paul Tracy; Steve Matchett	Jon Beekhuis; Katie Hargitt; Kevin Lee; Robin Miller
August 30	GoPro Grand Prix (Sonoma)	NBCSN	Leigh Diffey	Townsend Bell; Paul Tracy	Jon Beekhuis; Katie Hargitt; Kevin Lee; Robin Miller; Marty Snider

=== 2016 ===
Date	Event (track)	Network	Commentary		Pit reporters
Date	Event (track)	Network	Lap-by-lap	Color	Pit reporters
March 13	Firestone Grand Prix of St. Petersburg	ABC	Allen Bestwick	Scott Goodyear; Eddie Cheever	Jon Beekhuis; Rick DeBruhl; Jerry Punch
April 2	Desert Diamond West Valley Phoenix Grand Prix	NBCSN	Rick Allen	Townsend Bell; Paul Tracy	Katie Hargitt; Kevin Lee; Robin Miller; Marty Snider
April 17	Toyota Grand Prix of Long Beach	NBCSN	Rick Allen	Townsend Bell; Paul Tracy	Katie Hargitt; Kevin Lee; Robin Miller; Marty Snider
April 24	Honda Indy Grand Prix of Alabama (Barber)	NBCSN	Rick Allen	Townsend Bell; Paul Tracy	Katie Hargitt; Kevin Lee; Marty Snider
May 14	Angie's List Grand Prix of Indianapolis	ABC	Allen Bestwick	Eddie Cheever; Scott Goodyear	Jon Beekhuis; Rick DeBruhl; Jerry Punch
May 29	100th Indianapolis 500	ABC	Allen Bestwick	Eddie Cheever; Scott Goodyear	Jon Beekhuis; Rick DeBruhl; Jerry Punch
June 4	Chevrolet Dual in Detroit–Race 1 (Belle Isle)	ABC	Allen Bestwick	Eddie Cheever; Scott Goodyear	Jon Beekhuis; Rick DeBruhl; Jerry Punch
June 5	Chevrolet Dual in Detroit–Race 2 (Belle Isle)	ABC	Allen Bestwick	Eddie Cheever; Scott Goodyear	Jon Beekhuis; Rick DeBruhl; Jerry Punch
June 26	Kohler Grand Prix (Road America)	NBCSN	Leigh Diffey	Townsend Bell; Paul Tracy	Katie Hargitt; Kevin Lee; Robin Miller; Marty Snider
July 10	Iowa Corn 300	NBCSN	Brian Till	Townsend Bell; Paul Tracy	Jon Beekhuis; Katie Hargitt; Kevin Lee; Robin Miller
July 17	Honda Indy Toronto	NBCSN	Leigh Diffey	Townsend Bell; Paul Tracy	Jon Beekhuis; Katie Hargitt; Kevin Lee; Robin Miller
July 31	Honda Indy 200 (Mid-Ohio)	CNBC	Brian Till	Townsend Bell; Paul Tracy	Jon Beekhuis; Katie Hargitt; Kevin Lee; Robin Miller
August 22	ABC Supply 500 (Pocono)	NBCSN	Brian Till	Townsend Bell; Robin Miller	Jon Beekhuis; Katie Hargitt; Kevin Lee
August 27	Firestone 600 (Texas)	NBCSN	Kevin Lee	Townsend Bell; Paul Tracy	Jon Beekhuis; Conor Daly; Katie Hargitt; Robin Miller
September 4	IndyCar Grand Prix at The Glen	NBCSN	Kevin Lee	Townsend Bell; Paul Tracy	Jon Beekhuis; Katie Hargitt; Robin Miller
September 18	GoPro Grand Prix (Sonoma)	NBCSN	Leigh Diffey	Townsend Bell; Paul Tracy	Jon Beekhuis; Katie Hargitt; Kevin Lee; Robin Miller

=== 2017 ===
Date	Event (track)	Network	Commentary		Pit reporters
Date	Event (track)	Network	Lap-by-lap	Color	Pit reporters
March 12	Firestone Grand Prix of St. Petersburg	ABC	Allen Bestwick	Eddie Cheever; Scott Goodyear	Jon Beekhuis; Rick DeBruhl; Jerry Punch
April 9	Toyota Grand Prix of Long Beach	NBCSN	Rick Allen	Townsend Bell; Paul Tracy	Katie Hargitt; Kevin Lee; Robin Miller; Marty Snider
April 23	Honda Indy Grand Prix of Alabama (Barber)	NBCSN	Leigh Diffey	Townsend Bell; Paul Tracy	Katie Hargitt; Kevin Lee; Robin Miller; Marty Snider
April 29	Desert Diamond West Valley Phoenix Grand Prix	NBCSN	Rick Allen	Townsend Bell; Paul Tracy	Katie Hargitt; Kevin Lee; Robin Miller; Marty Snider
May 13	IndyCar Grand Prix (Indy RC)	ABC	Allen Bestwick	Eddie Cheever; Scott Goodyear	Jon Beekhuis; Rick DeBruhl; Jerry Punch
May 28	101st Indianapolis 500	ABC	Allen Bestwick	Eddie Cheever; Scott Goodyear	Jon Beekhuis; Rick DeBruhl; Jerry Punch
June 3	Chevrolet Detroit Grand Prix–Race 1 (Belle Isle)	ABC	Allen Bestwick	Eddie Cheever; Scott Goodyear	Jon Beekhuis; Rick DeBruhl; Jerry Punch
June 4	Chevrolet Detroit Grand Prix–Race 2 (Belle Isle)	ABC	Allen Bestwick	Eddie Cheever; Scott Goodyear	Jon Beekhuis; Rick DeBruhl; Jerry Punch
June 10	Rainguard Water Sealers 600 (Texas)	NBCSN	Kevin Lee	Townsend Bell; Paul Tracy	Jon Beekhuis; Katie Hargitt; Robin Miller; Marty Snider
June 25	Kohler Grand Prix (Road America)	NBCSN	Kevin Lee	Townsend Bell; Paul Tracy	Jon Beekhuis; Katie Hargitt; Robin Miller; Marty Snider
July 9	Iowa Corn 300	NBCSN	Kevin Lee	Townsend Bell; Paul Tracy	Jon Beekhuis; Katie Hargitt; Anders Krohn; Robin Miller
July 16	Honda Indy Toronto	CNBC	Kevin Lee	Townsend Bell; Paul Tracy	Jon Beekhuis; Katie Hargitt; Anders Krohn; Robin Miller
July 30	Honda Indy 200 (Mid-Ohio)	CNBC	Kevin Lee	Townsend Bell; Paul Tracy	Jon Beekhuis; Katie Hargitt; Anders Krohn; Robin Miller
August 20	ABC Supply 500 (Pocono)	NBCSN	Kevin Lee	Townsend Bell; Paul Tracy	Jon Beekhuis; Katie Hargitt; Anders Krohn; Robin Miller
August 26	Bommarito Automotive Group 500 (Gateway)	NBCSN	Kevin Lee	Townsend Bell; Paul Tracy	Jon Beekhuis; Katie Hargitt; Anders Krohn; Robin Miller
September 3	IndyCar Grand Prix (Watkins Glen)	NBCSN	Leigh Diffey	Townsend Bell; Paul Tracy	Jon Beekhuis; Katie Hargitt; Kevin Lee; Robin Miller
September 17	GoPro Grand Prix (Sonoma)	NBCSN	Leigh Diffey	Townsend Bell; Paul Tracy	Jon Beekhuis; Katie Hargitt; Kevin Lee; Robin Miller

=== 2018 ===
Date	Event (track)	Network	Commentary		Pit reporters
Date	Event (track)	Network	Lap-by-lap	Color	Pit reporters
March 11	Firestone Grand Prix of St. Petersburg	ABC	Allen Bestwick	Scott Goodyear; Eddie Cheever	Jon Beekhuis; Rick DeBruhl
April 7	Desert Diamond West Valley Phoenix Grand Prix	NBCSN	Leigh Diffey	Townsend Bell; Paul Tracy	Katie Hargitt; Kevin Lee; Robin Miller; Marty Snider
April 15	Toyota Grand Prix of Long Beach	NBCSN	Leigh Diffey	Townsend Bell; Paul Tracy	Katie Hargitt; Kevin Lee; Robin Miller; Marty Snider
April 22–23	Honda Indy Grand Prix of Alabama (Barber)	NBCSN	Leigh Diffey	Townsend Bell; Paul Tracy	Katie Hargitt; Kevin Lee; Robin Miller; Marty Snider
May 12	IndyCar Grand Prix (Indy RC)	ABC	Allen Bestwick	Scott Goodyear; Eddie Cheever	Jon Beekhuis; Rick DeBruhl; Jerry Punch
May 27	102nd Indianapolis 500	ABC	Allen Bestwick	Scott Goodyear; Eddie Cheever	Jon Beekhuis; Rick DeBruhl; Jerry Punch
June 2	Chevrolet Detroit Grand Prix–Race 1 (Belle Isle)	ABC	Allen Bestwick	Scott Goodyear; Eddie Cheever	Jon Beekhuis; Rick DeBruhl
June 3	Chevrolet Detroit Grand Prix–Race 2 (Belle Isle)	ABC	Allen Bestwick	Scott Goodyear; Eddie Cheever	Jon Beekhuis; Rick DeBruhl
June 9	DXC Technology 600 (Texas)	NBCSN	Leigh Diffey	Townsend Bell; Paul Tracy	Katie Hargitt; Kevin Lee; Robin Miller; Marty Snider; Kelli Stavast
June 24	Kohler Grand Prix (Road America)	NBCSN	Leigh Diffey	Townsend Bell; Paul Tracy	Katie Hargitt; Kevin Lee; Robin Miller; Marty Snider; Kelli Stavast
July 9	Iowa Corn 300	NBCSN	Leigh Diffey	Townsend Bell; Paul Tracy	Jon Beekhuis; Katie Hargitt; Kevin Lee; Robin Miller
July 15	Honda Indy Toronto	NBCSN	Leigh Diffey	Townsend Bell; Paul Tracy	Jon Beekhuis; Katie Hargitt; Kevin Lee; Robin Miller
July 29	Honda Indy 200 (Mid-Ohio)	CNBC	Leigh Diffey	Townsend Bell; Paul Tracy	Jon Beekhuis; Katie Hargitt; Kevin Lee; Robin Miller
August 19	ABC Supply 500 (Pocono)	NBCSN	Leigh Diffey	Townsend Bell; Paul Tracy	Jon Beekhuis; Katie Hargitt; Kevin Lee; Robin Miller
August 25	Bommarito Automotive Group 500 (Gateway)	NBCSN	Kevin Lee	Townsend Bell; Paul Tracy	Jon Beekhuis; Katie Hargitt; Anders Krohn; Robin Miller
September 2	Grand Prix of Portland	NBCSN	Leigh Diffey	Townsend Bell; Paul Tracy	Jon Beekhuis; Katie Hargitt; Kevin Lee; Robin Miller
September 16	GoPro Grand Prix (Sonoma)	NBCSN	Leigh Diffey	Townsend Bell; Paul Tracy	Jon Beekhuis; Katie Hargitt; Kevin Lee; Robin Miller

=== 2019 ===
Date	Event (track)	Network	Commentary		Pit reporters
Date	Event (track)	Network	Lap-by-lap	Color	Pit reporters
March 10	Firestone Grand Prix of St. Petersburg	NBCSN	Leigh Diffey	Townsend Bell; Paul Tracy	Jon Beekhuis; Kevin Lee; Robin Miller; Marty Snider; Kelli Stavast
March 24	IndyCar Classic (COTA)	NBCSN	Leigh Diffey	Townsend Bell; Paul Tracy	Kevin Lee; Robin Miller; Marty Snider; Kelli Stavast
April 7	Honda Indy Grand Prix of Alabama (Barber)	NBCSN	Leigh Diffey	Townsend Bell; Paul Tracy	Kevin Lee; Robin Miller; Marty Snider; Kelli Stavast
April 14	Acura Grand Prix of Long Beach	NBCSN	Leigh Diffey	Townsend Bell; Paul Tracy	Kevin Lee; Robin Miller; Marty Snider; Kelli Stavast
May 11	IndyCar Grand Prix (Indy RC)	NBC	Leigh Diffey	Townsend Bell; Paul Tracy	Kevin Lee; Robin Miller; Marty Snider; Kelli Stavast
May 26	103rd Indianapolis 500	NBC	Leigh Diffey	Townsend Bell; Paul Tracy	Jon Beekhuis; Kevin Lee; Robin Miller; Marty Snider; Kelli Stavast
June 1	Chevrolet Detroit Grand Prix–Race 1 (Belle Isle)	NBC	Leigh Diffey	Townsend Bell; Paul Tracy	Jon Beekhuis; Kevin Lee; Robin Miller; Marty Snider
June 2	Chevrolet Detroit Grand Prix–Race 2 (Belle Isle)	NBC	Leigh Diffey	Townsend Bell; Paul Tracy	Jon Beekhuis; Kevin Lee; Robin Miller; Marty Snider
June 8	DXC Technology 600 (Texas)	NBCSN	Leigh Diffey	Townsend Bell; Paul Tracy	Jon Beekhuis; Kevin Lee; Robin Miller; Kelli Stavast
June 23	REV Group Grand Prix (Road America)	NBC	Leigh Diffey	Townsend Bell; Paul Tracy	Kevin Lee; Robin Miller; Marty Snider; Dillon Welch
July 14	Honda Indy Toronto	NBCSN	Leigh Diffey	Townsend Bell; Paul Tracy	Jon Beekhuis; Robin Miller; Dillon Welch
July 20	Iowa 300	NBCSN	Leigh Diffey	A. J. Allmendinger; Paul Tracy	Kevin Lee; Robin Miller; Dillon Welch
July 28	Honda Indy 200 (Mid-Ohio)	NBC	Leigh Diffey	Townsend Bell; Paul Tracy	Jon Beekhuis; Robin Miller
August 18	ABC Supply 500 (Pocono)	NBCSN	Leigh Diffey	Townsend Bell; Paul Tracy	Kevin Lee; Robin Miller; Dillon Welch
August 24	Bommarito Automotive Group 500 (Gateway)	NBCSN	Leigh Diffey	Townsend Bell; Paul Tracy	Kevin Lee; Robin Miller; Kelli Stavast
September 1	Grand Prix of Portland	NBC	Leigh Diffey	Townsend Bell; Paul Tracy	Jon Beekhuis; Kevin Lee; Robin Miller; Dillon Welch
September 22	Firestone Grand Prix of Monterey (Laguna Seca)	NBC	Leigh Diffey	Townsend Bell; Paul Tracy	Jon Beekhuis; Kevin Lee; Robin Miller; Marty Snider

=== 2020 ===
Date	Event (track)	Network	Commentary		Pit reporters
Date	Event (track)	Network	Lap-by-lap	Color	Pit reporters
June 6	Genesys 300 (Texas)	NBC	Leigh Diffey	Townsend Bell; Paul Tracy	Marty Snider; Kelli Stavast
July 4	GMR Grand Prix (Indy RC)	NBC	Leigh Diffey	Townsend Bell; Paul Tracy	Dave Burns; Marty Snider
July 11	REV Group Grand Prix–Race 1	NBCSN	Leigh Diffey	Townsend Bell; Paul Tracy	Dave Burns; James Hinchcliffe
July 12	REV Group Grand Prix–Race 2	NBC	Leigh Diffey	Townsend Bell; Paul Tracy	Dave Burns; James Hinchcliffe
July 17	Iowa IndyCar 250s–Race 1	NBCSN	Leigh Diffey	Paul Tracy; James Hinchcliffe	Kelli Stavast; Dillon Welch
July 18	Iowa IndyCar 250s–Race 2	NBCSN	Leigh Diffey	Paul Tracy; James Hinchcliffe	Kelli Stavast; Dillon Welch
August 23	104th Indianapolis 500	NBC	Leigh Diffey	Townsend Bell; Paul Tracy	Kevin Lee; Marty Snider; Kelli Stavast
August 29	Bommarito Automotive Group 500–Race 1	NBCSN	Leigh Diffey	Townsend Bell; Paul Tracy; James Hinchcliffe	Kevin Lee
August 30	Bommarito Automotive Group 500–Race 2	NBCSN	Leigh Diffey	Townsend Bell; Paul Tracy; James Hinchcliffe	Kevin Lee
September 12	Honda Indy 200–Race 1 (Mid-Ohio)	NBCSN	Leigh Diffey	Townsend Bell; Paul Tracy	James Hinchcliffe; Kelli Stavast
September 13	Honda Indy 200–Race 2	NBC	Leigh Diffey	Townsend Bell; Paul Tracy	James Hinchcliffe; Kelli Stavast
October 2	Harvest Grand Prix–Race 1	USA	Leigh Diffey	Townsend Bell; Paul Tracy	Kevin Lee; Dillon Welch
October 3	Harvest Grand Prix–Race 2	NBC	Leigh Diffey	Townsend Bell; Paul Tracy	Kevin Lee; Dillon Welch
October 25	Firestone Grand Prix of St. Petersburg	NBC	Leigh Diffey	Townsend Bell; Paul Tracy	Kevin Lee; Marty Snider

=== 2021 ===
Date	Event (track)	Network	Commentary		Pit reporters
Date	Event (track)	Network	Lap-by-lap	Color	Pit reporters
April 18	Honda Indy Grand Prix of Alabama (Barber)	NBC	Leigh Diffey	Townsend Bell; Paul Tracy	Dave Burns; Marty Snider; Kelli Stavast
April 25	Firestone Grand Prix of St. Petersburg	NBC	Leigh Diffey	Townsend Bell; Paul Tracy	Dave Burns; Marty Snider
May 1	Genesys 300 (Texas)	NBCSN	Leigh Diffey	Townsend Bell; Paul Tracy	Marty Snider; Kelli Stavast
May 2	XPEL 375 (Texas)	NBCSN	Leigh Diffey	Townsend Bell; Paul Tracy	Marty Snider; Kelli Stavast
May 15	GMR Grand Prix (Indy RC)	NBC	Leigh Diffey	Townsend Bell; Paul Tracy	Kevin Lee; Marty Snider
May 30	105th Indianapolis 500	NBC	Leigh Diffey	Townsend Bell; Paul Tracy	Dave Burns; Kevin Lee; Marty Snider; Kelli Stavast
June 12	Chevrolet Detroit Grand Prix–Race 1 (Belle Isle)	NBC	Leigh Diffey	Townsend Bell	Kevin Lee; Marty Snider
June 13	Chevrolet Detroit Grand Prix–Race 2 (Belle Isle)	NBC	Leigh Diffey	Townsend Bell	Kevin Lee; Marty Snider
June 20	REV Group Grand Prix (Road America)	NBCSN	Kevin Lee	Townsend Bell	Dave Burns; Dillon Welch
July 4	Honda Indy 200 (Mid-Ohio)	NBC	Leigh Diffey	Townsend Bell	Kevin Lee; Kelli Stavast
August 8	Big Machine Music City Grand Prix	NBCSN	Kevin Lee	Townsend Bell; Paul Tracy	Dave Burns; Marty Snider
August 14	Big Machine Spiked Coolers Grand Prix (Indy RC)	NBCSN	Leigh Diffey	Townsend Bell; Paul Tracy	Kevin Lee; Marty Snider
August 21	Bommarito Automotive Group 500 (Gateway)	NBCSN	Leigh Diffey	Townsend Bell; Paul Tracy	Kevin Lee; Kelli Stavast
September 12	Grand Prix of Portland	NBC; Peacock	Leigh Diffey	Townsend Bell; Paul Tracy	Kevin Lee; Kelli Stavast
September 19	Firestone Grand Prix of Monterey (Laguna Seca)	NBC; Peacock	Leigh Diffey	Townsend Bell; Paul Tracy	Kevin Lee; Kelli Stavast
September 26	Acura Grand Prix of Long Beach	NBCSN	Leigh Diffey	Townsend Bell; Paul Tracy	Kevin Lee; Marty Snider

=== 2022 ===
Date	Event (track)	Network	Commentary		Pit reporters
Date	Event (track)	Network	Lap-by-lap	Color	Pit reporters
February 27	Firestone Grand Prix of St. Petersburg	NBC; Peacock	Leigh Diffey	Townsend Bell; James Hinchcliffe	Dave Burns; Kevin Lee; Marty Snider
March 20	XPEL 375 (Texas)	NBC; Peacock	Leigh Diffey	Townsend Bell; James Hinchcliffe	Kevin Lee; Marty Snider
April 10	Acura Grand Prix of Long Beach	NBC; Peacock	Leigh Diffey	Townsend Bell; James Hinchcliffe	Dave Burns; Kevin Lee; Marty Snider
May 1	Honda Indy Grand Prix of Alabama (Barber)	NBC; Peacock	Leigh Diffey	Townsend Bell; James Hinchcliffe	Kevin Lee; Marty Snider; Dillon Welch
May 14	GMR Grand Prix (Indy RC)	NBC; Peacock	Leigh Diffey	Townsend Bell; James Hinchcliffe	Kevin Lee; Marty Snider; Dillon Welch
May 29	106th Indianapolis 500	NBC; Peacock	Leigh Diffey	Townsend Bell; James Hinchcliffe	Dave Burns; Kevin Lee; Marty Snider; Dillon Welch
June 5	Chevrolet Detroit Grand Prix (Belle Isle)	USA; Peacock	Leigh Diffey	Townsend Bell; James Hinchcliffe	Dave Burns; Kevin Lee; Marty Snider
June 12	Sonsio Grand Prix (Road America)	NBC; Peacock	Leigh Diffey	Townsend Bell; James Hinchcliffe	Dave Burns; Kevin Lee; Marty Snider
July 3	Honda Indy 200 (Mid-Ohio)	NBC; Peacock	Leigh Diffey	Townsend Bell; James Hinchcliffe	Kevin Lee; Dillon Welch
July 17	Honda Indy Toronto	Peacock	Kevin Lee	Townsend Bell; James Hinchcliffe	Dave Burns; Dillon Welch
July 23	Hy-VeeDeals.com 250 (Iowa)	NBC; Peacock	Kevin Lee	Townsend Bell; James Hinchcliffe	Dave Burns; Nate Ryan; Dillon Welch
July 24	Hy-Vee Salute to Farmers 300 (Iowa)	NBC; Peacock	Kevin Lee	Townsend Bell; James Hinchcliffe	Dave Burns; Nate Ryan; Dillon Welch
July 30	Gallagher Grand Prix (Indy RC)	NBC; Peacock	Leigh Diffey	Townsend Bell; James Hinchcliffe; Dale Earnhardt Jr.	Kevin Lee; Dillon Welch
August 7	Big Machine Music City Grand Prix	NBC; Peacock	Leigh Diffey	Townsend Bell; James Hinchcliffe	Dave Burns; Kevin Lee; Dillon Welch
August 20	Bommarito Automotive Group 500 (Gateway)	USA; Peacock	Leigh Diffey	Townsend Bell; James Hinchcliffe	Kevin Lee; Dillon Welch
September 4	Grand Prix of Portland	NBC; Peacock	Leigh Diffey	Townsend Bell; James Hinchcliffe	Kevin Lee; Dillon Welch
September 11	Firestone Grand Prix of Monterey (Laguna Seca)	NBC; Peacock	Leigh Diffey	Townsend Bell; James Hinchcliffe	Kevin Lee; Marty Snider; Dillon Welch

=== 2023 ===
Date	Event (track)	Network	Commentary		Pit reporters
Date	Event (track)	Network	Lap-by-lap	Color	Pit reporters
March 5	Firestone Grand Prix of St. Petersburg	NBC; Peacock	Leigh Diffey	Townsend Bell; James Hinchcliffe	Dave Burns; Kevin Lee; Marty Snider
April 2	PPG 375 (Texas)	NBC; Peacock	Leigh Diffey	Townsend Bell; James Hinchcliffe	Dave Burns; Marty Snider
April 16	Acura Grand Prix of Long Beach	NBC; Peacock	Leigh Diffey	Townsend Bell; James Hinchcliffe	Dave Burns; Kevin Lee; Marty Snider
April 30	Children's of Alabama Indy Grand Prix (Barber)	NBC; Peacock	Leigh Diffey	Townsend Bell; James Hinchcliffe	Dave Burns; Kevin Lee; Marty Snider
May 13	GMR Grand Prix (Indy RC)	NBC; Peacock	Leigh Diffey	Townsend Bell; James Hinchcliffe	Kevin Lee; Marty Snider
May 28	107th Indianapolis 500	NBC; Peacock	Leigh Diffey	Townsend Bell; James Hinchcliffe	Dave Burns; Kevin Lee; Marty Snider; Dillon Welch
June 4	Chevrolet Detroit Grand Prix	NBC; Peacock	Leigh Diffey	Townsend Bell; James Hinchcliffe	Dave Burns; Kevin Lee; Marty Snider
June 18	Sonsio Grand Prix (Road America)	USA; Peacock	Leigh Diffey	Townsend Bell; James Hinchcliffe	Kevin Lee; Dillon Welch
July 2	Honda Indy 200 (Mid-Ohio)	USA; Peacock	Leigh Diffey	Townsend Bell; James Hinchcliffe	Kevin Lee; Dillon Welch
July 16	Honda Indy Toronto	Peacock	Leigh Diffey	Townsend Bell; James Hinchcliffe	Kevin Lee; Dillon Welch
July 22	Hy-Vee Homefront 250	NBC; Peacock	Leigh Diffey	Townsend Bell; James Hinchcliffe	Dave Burns; Kevin Lee
July 23	Hy-Vee One Step 250	NBC; Peacock	Leigh Diffey	Townsend Bell; James Hinchcliffe	Dave Burns; Kevin Lee
August 6	Big Machine Music City Grand Prix	NBC; Peacock	Leigh Diffey	Townsend Bell; Paul Tracy	Dave Burns; Kevin Lee; Dillon Welch
August 12	Gallagher Grand Prix (Indy RC)	USA; Peacock	Leigh Diffey	Townsend Bell; James Hinchcliffe	Kevin Lee; Dillon Welch
August 27	Bommarito Automotive Group 500 (Gateway)	NBC; Peacock	Kevin Lee	Townsend Bell; James Hinchcliffe	Georgia Henneberry; Dillon Welch
September 3	BitNile.com Grand Prix of Portland	NBC; Peacock	Leigh Diffey	Townsend Bell; James Hinchcliffe	Kevin Lee; Dillon Welch
September 10	Firestone Grand Prix of Monterey (Laguna Seca)	NBC; Peacock	Leigh Diffey	Townsend Bell; James Hinchcliffe	Kevin Lee; Marty Snider; Dillon Welch

=== 2024 ===
Date	Event (track)	Network	Commentary		Pit reporters
Date	Event (track)	Network	Lap-by-lap	Color	Pit reporters
March 10	Firestone Grand Prix of St. Petersburg	NBC; Peacock	Leigh Diffey	Townsend Bell; James Hinchcliffe	Georgia Henneberry; Kevin Lee; Marty Snider
March 24	$1 Million Challenge (Thermal)	NBC; Peacock	Leigh Diffey	Townsend Bell; James Hinchcliffe	Kevin Lee; Marty Snider
April 21	Acura Grand Prix of Long Beach	USA; Peacock	Leigh Diffey	Townsend Bell; James Hinchcliffe	Kevin Lee; Marty Snider; Dillon Welch
April 28	Children's of Alabama Indy Grand Prix (Barber)	NBC; Peacock	Leigh Diffey	Townsend Bell; James Hinchcliffe	Kevin Lee; Marty Snider; Dillon Welch
May 11	Sonsio Grand Prix (Indy RC)	NBC; Peacock	Leigh Diffey	Townsend Bell; James Hinchcliffe	Kevin Lee; Marty Snider
May 26	108th Indianapolis 500	NBC; Peacock	Leigh Diffey	Townsend Bell; James Hinchcliffe	Dave Burns; Kevin Lee; Marty Snider; Dillon Welch
June 2	Chevrolet Detroit Grand Prix	USA; Peacock	Leigh Diffey	Townsend Bell; James Hinchcliffe	Kevin Lee; Marty Snider; Dillon Welch
June 9	XPEL Grand Prix (Road America)	NBC; Peacock	Leigh Diffey	Townsend Bell; James Hinchcliffe	Georgia Henneberry; Kevin Lee; Marty Snider
June 23	Firestone Grand Prix of Monterey (Laguna Seca)	CNBC; USA; Peacock	Kevin Lee	Townsend Bell; James Hinchcliffe	Georgia Henneberry; Dillon Welch
July 7	Honda Indy 200 (Mid-Ohio)	NBC; Peacock	Kevin Lee	Townsend Bell; James Hinchcliffe	Georgia Henneberry; Charlie Kimball
July 13	Hy-Vee Homefront 250 (Iowa)	CNBC; Peacock	Leigh Diffey	Townsend Bell; James Hinchcliffe	Georgia Henneberry; Kevin Lee; Dillon Welch
July 14	Hy-Vee One Step 250 (Iowa)	NBC; Peacock	Leigh Diffey	Townsend Bell; James Hinchcliffe	Georgia Henneberry; Kevin Lee; Dillon Welch
July 21	Ontario Honda Dealers Indy Toronto	Peacock	Kevin Lee	Townsend Bell; James Hinchcliffe	Charlie Kimball; Dillon Welch
August 17	Bommarito Automotive Group 500 (Gateway)	USA; Peacock	Kevin Lee	Townsend Bell; James Hinchcliffe	Georgia Henneberry; Dillon Welch
August 25	BitNile.com Grand Prix (Portland)	USA; Peacock	Kevin Lee	Townsend Bell; James Hinchcliffe	Georgia Henneberry; Dillon Welch
August 31	Hy-Vee Milwaukee Mile 250–Race 1	Peacock	Kevin Lee	Townsend Bell; James Hinchcliffe	Georgia Henneberry; Dillon Welch
September 1	Hy-Vee Milwaukee Mile 250–Race 2	USA; Peacock	Kevin Lee	Townsend Bell; James Hinchcliffe	Georgia Henneberry; Dillon Welch
September 15	Big Machine Music City Grand Prix (Nashville)	NBC; Peacock	Kevin Lee	Townsend Bell; James Hinchcliffe	Dave Burns; Georgia Henneberry

=== 2025 ===
Date	Event (track)	Network	Commentary		Pit reporters
Date	Event (track)	Network	Lap-by-lap	Color	Pit reporters
March 2	Firestone Grand Prix of St. Petersburg	Fox	Will Buxton	Townsend Bell; James Hinchcliffe	Jack Harvey; Kevin Lee; Jamie Little
March 23	Thermal Club IndyCar Grand Prix	Fox	Will Buxton	Townsend Bell; James Hinchcliffe	Jack Harvey; Kevin Lee
April 13	Acura Grand Prix of Long Beach	Fox	Will Buxton	Townsend Bell; James Hinchcliffe	Jack Harvey; Kevin Lee
May 4	Children's of Alabama Indy Grand Prix (Barber)	Fox	Will Buxton	Townsend Bell; James Hinchcliffe	Jack Harvey; Georgia Henneberry; Kevin Lee
May 10	Sonsio Grand Prix (Indy RC)	Fox	Will Buxton	Townsend Bell; James Hinchcliffe	Jack Harvey; Georgia Henneberry; Kevin Lee
May 25	109th Indianapolis 500	Fox	Will Buxton	Townsend Bell; James Hinchcliffe	Georgia Henneberry; Kevin Lee; Jamie Little
June 1	Chevrolet Detroit Grand Prix	Fox	Will Buxton	Townsend Bell; James Hinchcliffe	Jack Harvey; Georgia Henneberry; Kevin Lee
