= Diffey =

Diffey is a surname. Notable people with the surname include:

- Leigh Diffey (born 1971), Australian-American auto racing commentator
- Lot Diffey (1877–1952), Australian politician
