= Marty Reid =

American motorsport announcer

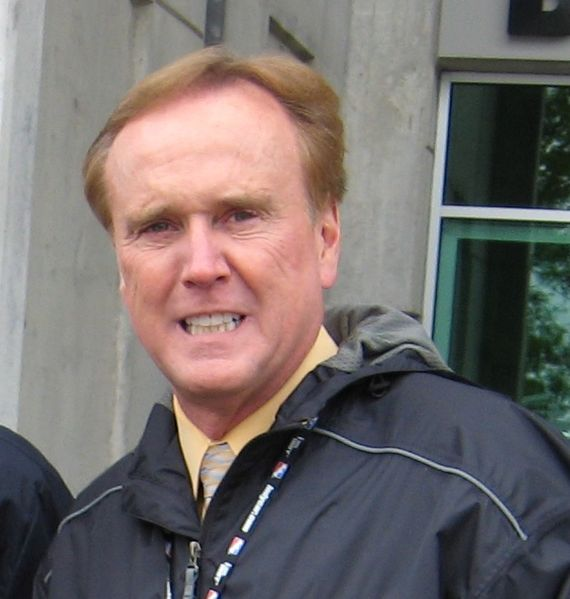
- Reid at the 2008 Indianapolis 500 Qualifying Day
- Born: Martin Reid Klinegman; February 3, 1953 (age 73); Darby, Pennsylvania, U.S.
- Education: Marietta College
- Occupation: Sportscaster
- Political party: Democratic
- Spouse: Karla (m. 1996)

Martin Reid Klingeman (born February 3, 1953) is an American television sportscaster who worked for ESPN from 1982 to 2013, covering motorsports for the network. Reid served as the network's lead IndyCar Series and Indianapolis 500 announcer from 2006 until that year, and did lap-by-lap for ESPN's NASCAR Sprint Cup Series telecasts in 2010.

== Career ==
Reid first dabbled in radio when his older brother, a disc jockey, needed another voice for a radio ad. In the following years, Reid worked on his sportscasting by calling Hershey Bears games into a tape recorder.

As Reid developed, he gained the opportunity to call Marietta College athletics while a student there. Upon graduation, he joined WCMH-TV in Columbus, Ohio in 1975. Among his duties were announcing Ohio State University hockey and Columbus Clippers telecasts. After turning down an opportunity to leave Columbus and call Charleston Charlies games, Reid—a former drag racing mechanic—had the opportunity to substitute on an NHRA telecast for ESPN.

In 1988, he started Marty Reid Enterprises, a video production company that worked closely with ESPN. He founded the short course off-road racing series Championship Off-Road Racing (CORR) in 1997 and sold it to Jim Baldwin in 2005.

Concurrently, Reid commentated off-road racing, the 24 Hours of Le Mans, and IMSA for ESPN, while also making appearances as a pit reporter on Formula One, CART, and lower division NASCAR broadcasts. Despite a hectic schedule, Reid did call one NHL game for ESPN in 1993, Los Angeles vs. Ottawa. Reid also found the time to serve as a spotter for Fermín Vélez and Team Scandia in the 1997 Indianapolis 500.

In 1998, the utility player Reid was rewarded with the play-by-play role for ESPN's coverage of the NASCAR Craftsman Truck Series. Reid held this role through 2000, working alongside Benny Parsons, Jeremy Dale, Larry Rice, and others. As needed, Reid would also fill-in on NASCAR Busch Series telecasts with the cable network, where he was partnered with Ned Jarrett and again with Dale.

Reid then returned to his drag racing roots as the lead TV announcer for the NHRA on ESPN from 2001 to 2006. Also in 2001, Reid debuted at the Indianapolis Motor Speedway, calling time trials as a fill-in for Bob Jenkins during ESPN's extensive coverage.

After Reid's work with the NHRA, ESPN and ABC Sports moved Reid to the IndyCar Series, where he succeeded Todd Harris as the television voice of the Indianapolis 500. Reid remained on the coverage in 2007, when ABC Sports dissolved into ESPN, and held his position through the 2013 season. Always partnered with Scott Goodyear, who became a personal friend, Reid also shared the booth with Rusty Wallace and Eddie Cheever.

When NASCAR returned to ESPN's family of networks in 2007, Reid joined the rotation of announcers for the Nationwide Series telecasts, relieving lead announcer Jerry Punch as needed. In 2010, Reid replaced Punch altogether as ESPN's voice for Sprint Cup Series and Nationwide Series broadcasts. Reid's role did not last long, however, with Allen Bestwick succeeding him by the end of July 2011. In his new position, Reid called the Nationwide races during ESPN's portion of the Cup schedule, while Bestwick handled both the first part of the Nationwide schedule and all the Cup broadcasts. While on play-by-play duty for ESPN, Reid worked with Andy Petree, Dale Jarrett, Ricky Craven, Randy LaJoie, Brad Daugherty, and Wallace, among others.

On September 29, 2013, Reid called his final race for ESPN, accidentally giving the win of the Kentucky 300 to eventual victor Ryan Blaney one lap early. Though the mistake was never confirmed to be the reason of Reid's departure from ESPN, he was nevertheless replaced by Bestwick in his NASCAR job for 2013 forward, and in the IndyCar position from 2014.

After a thirty-one-year career with ESPN and its related networks, Reid did not return to television or radio.

== Personal life ==
When Reid was a teenager, his older brother died in a motorcycle crash in Roanoke, VA. Reid's father, Robert Klingeman, passed in 1998, the year Reid took over as play-by-play announcer for NASCAR's Truck Series. In 2006, Reid's mother, Anne Klingeman, died just one day before Reid was asked to take over the Indianapolis 500 and IndyCar coverage for ABC and ESPN.

Reid and his wife, Karla, reside in Brownsburg, IN.

After years out of the spotlight, Reid would announce that he was running as a Democrat for county council in Hendricks County for the 2020 election. Reid would lose, scoring only 11 percent of the vote. All three Democratic challengers lost.

Preceded by Todd Harris	Television voice of the Indianapolis 500; 2006-2013	Succeeded by Allen Bestwick
