= Robin Miller (journalist) =

American journalist (1949–2021)

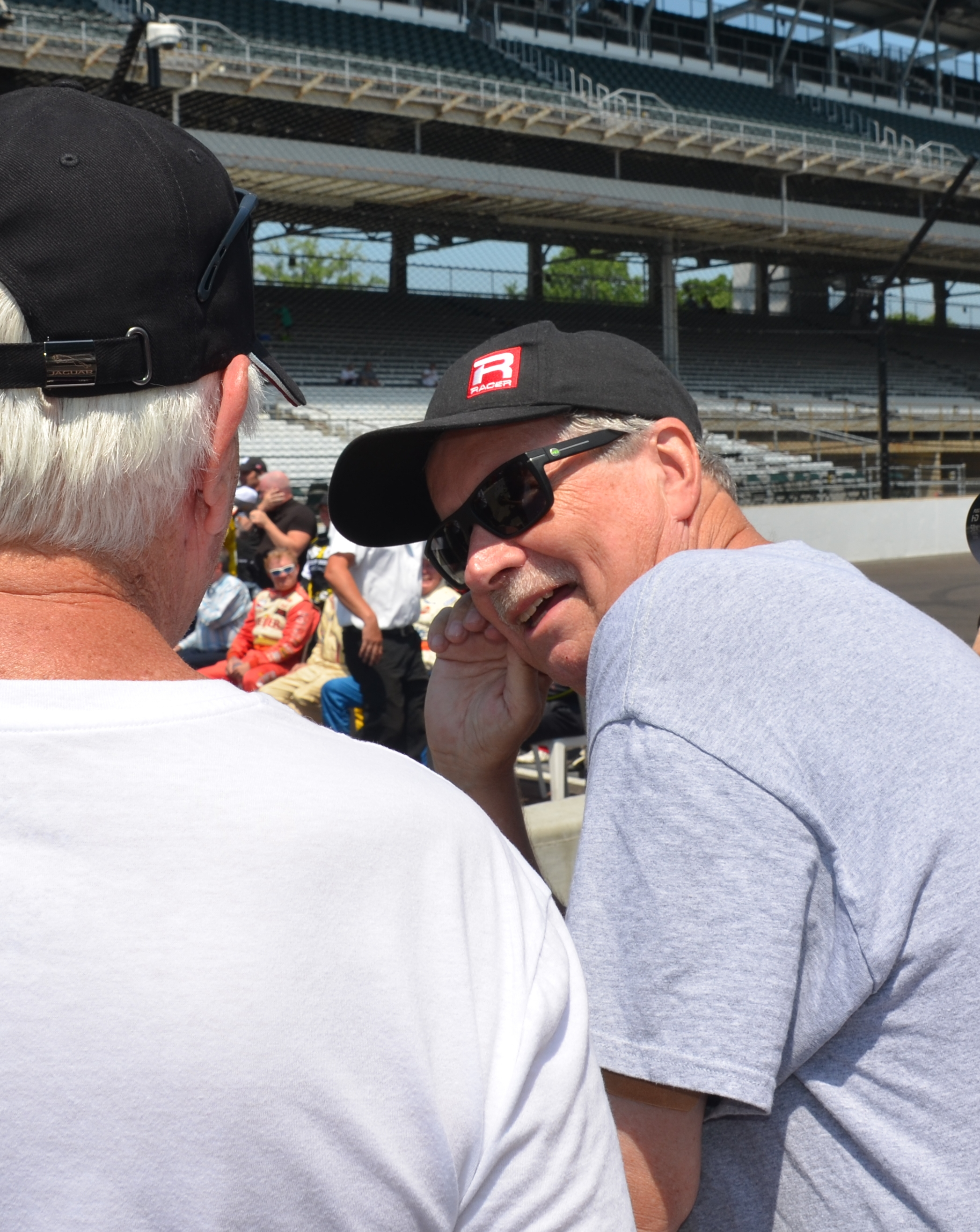
- Robin Miller at the Indianapolis Motor Speedway in 2018
- Born: October 27, 1949; Anderson, Indiana, U.S.
- Died: August 25, 2021 (aged 71); Indianapolis, Indiana, U.S.
- Occupation: Journalist
- Years active: 1968–2021
- Employer(s): RACER; NBCSN; The Indianapolis Star (former)
- Awards: 2021 Motorsports Hall of Fame of America inductee 2022 National Sprint Car Hall of Fame inductee

Robin Lee Miller (October 27, 1949 – August 25, 2021) was an American motorsports journalist. Miller was best known for being a writer at The Indianapolis Star from 1968 to 2001. He also wrote for Autoweek, Car and Driver, ESPN and Speed. At the time of his death, he was a correspondent and senior writer for RACER magazine and website, while also reporting on IndyCar Series broadcasts for NBCSN.

== Racing career ==
Miller first visited the Indianapolis Motor Speedway in 1957, and attended his first Indianapolis 500 in 1959. In 1968, at the age of 18, he got to "stooge" for his driving hero Jim Hurtubise at Indy. Miller was hired for free to do odd jobs with the pit crew, but was fired before the end of the month after he ruined the paint job on Hurtubise's car.

Miller became friends with chief mechanic Bill Finley, and driver Art Pollard. From 1971 to 1978 (concurrent to his work with The Star), Miller began working on pit crews at the Indianapolis 500. It was common during that time for racing teams to hire extra freelance help for the Indy 500 due to the extended (month-long) work commitment. He was assigned to various jobs, such as the pit board and vent man, but never worked mechanically on the cars. Finley, one of the last true chief mechanics at Indianapolis, described Miller as "without a mechanical bone in his body."

In 1972, Miller bought his first race car, from Andy Granatelli. He raced a Formula Ford in 1972, and then bought a midget car in 1974 from Gary Bettenhausen. He then competed in USAC midgets from 1975 to 1983. Miller's best race came in 1980 when he qualified 5th out of 93 cars for the annual "Hut 100" at the Terre Haute Action Track, a dirt race that featured 33 starters in 11 rows of three like Indy and also sported several top Indy drivers of the time. He considered that race the highlight of his career, however, he blew his engine and dropped out.

After about ten years, Miller quit driving due to his lack of mechanical knowledge, and massive debts.

== Media career ==
=== The Indianapolis Star ===
Miller was hired at The Indianapolis Star in 1968. His first duties included answering telephones in the sports department. A year later, he was moved into the sports department as a writer. One of his early assignments was a traveling reporter following the Indiana Pacers. During his career, he became a polarizing figure. In 1981, he gained attention when he accused A. J. Foyt of cheating, for which Foyt punched Miller, and the paper issued a retraction. Miller also stirred up controversy, taking on Bobby Knight, the Irsay family, girls' basketball, and female golfers. One of his heated columns led to the girls' basketball team from Franklin College challenging the paper's sports department to a match, and the sportswriters won the game.

Miller worked for 33 years at The Indianapolis Star, becoming one of the nation's best known sports writers for Indy car racing. He started covering the Indianapolis 500 in 1969. During the month of May for the Indy 500, in addition to his daily columns, Miller would have side gigs on WNAP-FM, WIBC, WTHR, and The Bob & Tom Show. In almost every year from 1978 to 1997, he served as the emcee of the popular Last Row Party. Miller also wrote and reported occasionally about NASCAR, including extensive coverage of the Brickyard 400. Following the 1996 open wheel split, Miller was highly critical of the Indy Racing League and Indianapolis Motor Speedway president Tony George. For this, he drew considerable ire from many locals and from various city leaders, but likewise gained a considerable following from CART supporters. However, he typically stopped short of directly criticizing most of the actual IRL drivers and crew members, explaining that most were hard-working and passionate about their sport, and merely intermixed in a political situation that was largely out of their control. He lost his radio show on WIBC and television job at Channel 13 for his anti-George stance. Eventually, after the department reorganized, Miller's duties shifted from columnist to focus solely on auto racing.

In January 2001, Miller was fired from the Star. The reasons given for his release were violations of the company's e-mail policy as well as the ethics policy. He reportedly sent abusive e-mails to readers, sent pornographic material to co-workers, and sent defamatory e-mails about local community leaders (namely Tony George and Colts officials). He also was charged with accepting $2,500 from Kenny Bräck for work on his web site (Miller claims he never received the money), and being paid to write promotional material for CART, which violated company policy. Miller filed a grievance over the dismissal, however, it was dismissed. An outside arbitrator ruled that the firing was justified due to "gross misconduct" on the job. Miller contended that the Indianapolis Motor Speedway president Tony George conspired to have him fired, due to his ongoing bad press about the IRL, and that behind the scenes, the Speedway would accept The Star as a business partner only if Miller was fired.

=== Subsequent jobs ===
Miller worked as a racing writer/reporter at ESPN from 2001 to 2004. He appeared on programs such as RPM 2Night and SportsCentury. During that time, he also wrote freelance for Champ Car's website. He was fired in March 2007 from Champ Car after he wrote a critical column that was perceived as undue criticism. The series eventually collapsed and merged with the IRL.

In 2004, Miller joined Speed as a writer and Indy Car "insider." He became a regular contributor to SpeedTV.com, SPEED Center, and WindTunnel with Dave Despain. He remained at the position until Speed's conversion to Fox Sports 1 in 2013. He was also a writer for Racer. With many trusted sources throughout the paddock, Miller has broken several big stories regarding IndyCar racing and the Indy 500, including the 2008 IRL/CCWS unification.

Even though his main focus was IndyCar, Miller also would break big news in the NASCAR world. Through a high source within the sport, Miller was told that RJ Reynolds was leaving NASCAR at the end of 2003. Which meant that Winston would no longer be the title sponsor for NASCAR. Miller would also break the news that Brian France would replace Mike Helton the following year.

Miller was asked later on about these reports by one of his colleagues, Marty Smith, who mainly covered NASCAR at that time. Smith asked how Miller, who does not make NASCAR his priority of writing in racing, broke two of the biggest stories NASCAR has had in a decade. Miller responded by saying, "I'm an old guy Marty, I have friends." Miller would never say who that source was.

=== Versus / NBC Sports Network ===
Starting in 2011, Miller served as an analyst for IndyCar coverage on Versus/NBC Sports Network. His duties included pre-race interviews, commentary, and various pit/garage area reports. At the 2011 Iowa Corn 250, he helped start the popular "grid walk" feature. He later served on the NBC telecasts of the Indianapolis 500 after NBC gained rights to the race in 2019.

== Personal life ==
Miller graduated from Southport High School in Indianapolis and flunked out of Ball State University "after two very enjoyable quarters." He also spent one semester at IUPUI. His first car was a 1962 Ford Galaxie.

Miller never married.

He claimed to have lost over $250,000 in gambling and stated that the worst moment in his career was when he lost his friend Art Pollard during practice for the Indy 500 in 1973.

Miller announced he had terminal leukemia in July 2021. He died in Indianapolis on August 25, 2021, at age 71. His death came twelve days after he was honored at a special Hall of Fame induction ceremony during the Brickyard weekend at the Indianapolis Motor Speedway.

== Legacy ==
Miller was inducted into the Motorsports Hall of Fame of America as part of the class of 2021. He was inducted in the National Sprint Car Hall of Fame in 2022 as a journalist.

After his death, Miller was awarded the Sagamore of the Wabash award by Governor Eric Holcomb, the highest honor presented to a citizen of Indiana by the governor.
