= Bob Varsha =

American broadcast journalist (born 1951)

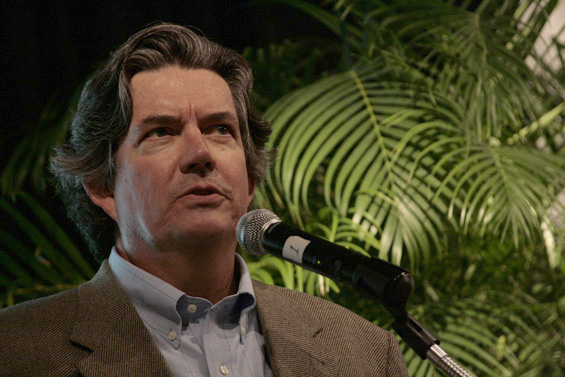
- Varsha at the 2010 Legends of Motorsport event at Barber Motorsports Park
- Born: Robert August Varsha; April 21, 1951 (age 75); Northport, New York, U.S.
- Education: Dartmouth College (BA); Emory University (JD)
- Occupations: Announcer, commentator

Robert August Varsha (born April 21, 1951) is an American broadcast journalist who specializes in covering motorsports. He is best known for being the lap-by-lap commentator for Formula 1 and CART series races for ESPN, ABC Sports, and Speed Channel among others.

== Early years ==
Varsha was born in Northport, New York, and graduated from Dartmouth College in 1973 with a Bachelor of Arts degree in foreign language. While attending Dartmouth, Varsha won varsity letters in cross country and track. He made the finals of the U.S. Olympic Trials marathon event twice, doing so while attending Emory University School of Law. Varsha won the inaugural Peach Bowl Half Marathon in 1980 at a time of 1:08:23.

Varsha practiced law in Atlanta, but his life took a different direction when TBS asked him to cover the Peachtree Road Race, which he headed as part of the Atlanta Track Club in 1980. He did so well that TBS offered him a part-time job. In 1986, Varsha joined ESPN, where he hosted the network's Formula One coverage as well the CART, the 24 Hours of Le Mans and many other sports including gymnastics, figure skating and track & field.

== Speed and Fox Broadcasting ==
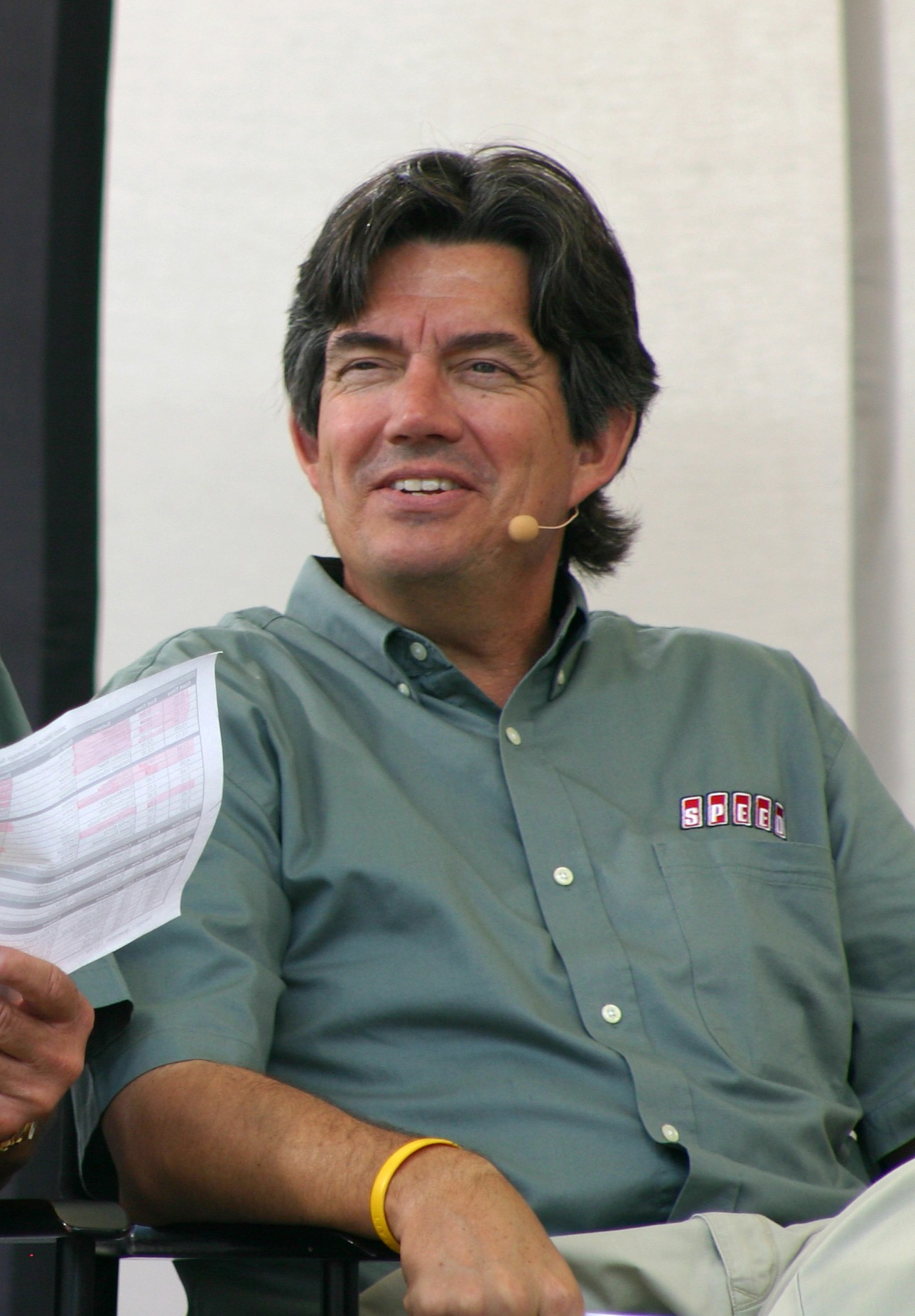
Varsha hosting Speed's coverage of the US Grand Prix at Indianapolis Motor Speedway in 2006

In 1999, Varsha moved to Speed, then known as SpeedVision. In 2002 and 2003, Varsha was the host of Speed's Champ Car coverage. Rick DeBruhl took over Varsha's Formula One host chair for that period. In 2004, Varsha returned to his Formula One hosting duties. In 2004, Varsha was also a part-time host/narrator for Speed's coverage of the World Rally Championship, even reporting on-site from the WRC's inaugural event in Mexico. Varsha also commentated on the Barrett-Jackson Collector Car Auction on Speed Channel in Scottsdale, Arizona, Palm Beach, Florida, Orange County, California and Las Vegas, Nevada annually.

At the end of the 2012 Formula 1 season, it was announced that Speed and Fox would no longer present the entire live Formula 1 schedule for the United States market. Varsha, who was under contract to Speed, was quoted as saying that this merely represented "one single apex in a life of innumerable apices." Varsha was the lead broadcaster for the WeatherTech SportsCar Championship on Fox Sports 1 & Fox Sports 2 through the end of the 2016 season. He is also leader of the network's FIA World Endurance Championship coverage, including the 24 Hours of Le Mans.

Varsha was the original studio host for the Formula E series on Fox Sports. Starting in the 2016-17 season, he joined the world feed as a host and continued this role in the 2017–18 season.

== Other networks ==
CBS "borrowed" Varsha and other talent from Speed when they broadcast Champ Car races in 2002 & 2003.

Varsha was permitted by Fox to host three F1 races during the 2013 season for the NBC Sports Network (the three races that are on the same day as an IZOD IndyCar Series race (Malaysia, Belgium, and Korea) as regular lead host Leigh Diffey was also lead host on IndyCar broadcasts for NBCSN), which carried F1 in the United States until the end of 2017. In 2014, Varsha was again permitted to work with NBCSN's coverage, but NBCSN decided instead to have Varsha be lead broadcaster for the Verizon IndyCar Series races instead of Formula 1, where Diffey remained lead broadcaster for the entire season. In 2014, Varsha worked Carb Day, Pocono, and the Toronto IndyCar race weekends.

Varsha called the 2016 Belgian Grand Prix on NBCSN with Steve Matchett and David Hobbs filling in for regular F1 announcer Leigh Diffey who was ill after he called the Olympics for NBC. Varsha also covered for Diffey on NBCSN's coverage of the F1 Singapore Grand Prix on September 17, 2017, as Diffey was on assignment covering the IndyCar Series finale the same weekend.

== Radio ==
In January 2002 Varsha joined Focus On Racing Radio, syndicated by Westwood One. The show originates from Memphis, Tennessee, but Varsha hosts from Atlanta, Georgia and from the Speed TV studios in Charlotte, North Carolina Varsha's co-host on the show is Forrest Goodman of Memphis, Tennessee. The radio program is delivered in a magazine-style format and features interviews with top drivers from all forms of motorsports. The show's slogan is "The Fastest Hour In Radio!"

Varsha was play-by-play radio announcer for the 2014 United States Grand Prix in Austin, Texas.

== Personal life ==
Varsha's son, Matt, drove in the Star Mazda Series for most of 2006, but had to withdraw near season's end due to lack of financial backing.

In January 2020, Varsha revealed that he had been diagnosed with prostate cancer and would begin chemotherapy treatment.
