= Will Buxton =

British motorsport commentator (born 1981)

- Buxton in 2024
- Born: William Thomas Buxton; 14 February 1981 (age 45); Portsmouth, England
- Education: University of Leeds
- Occupations: Presenter; Journalist; Sports commentator Author
- Years active: 2002–present
- Employer: Fox Sports

William Thomas Buxton (born 14 February 1981) is a British motorsport journalist, commentator and presenter who is currently the lead commentator for Fox Sports' coverage of the IndyCar Series beginning with the 2025 season. He is best known for his coverage of Formula One with the Formula One Group from 2018 to 2024.

== Early and personal life ==
Buxton was born in Portsmouth, Hampshire, but grew up in Malvern, Worcestershire. He attended King's School, Worcester, where he was a chorister at Worcester Cathedral under Donald Hunt. He went on to study at Lord Wandsworth College and Sixth Form College, Farnborough, in Hampshire before studying politics at the University of Leeds.

In 2018, Buxton announced he was engaged to Victoria Helyar, who worked in marketing for the Racing Point F1 Team. They got married in April 2022. The couple have two children, a daughter born 5 July 2023 and a son born 12 November 2025. Buxton also has a daughter from a previous relationship.

== Racing career ==
In 2014, Buxton was invited to participate in the inaugural Florida Winter Series. He drove at three events, alongside future Formula One drivers Max Verstappen, Lance Stroll and Nicholas Latifi.

== Motorsports journalism ==
Buxton got his start in motorsport journalism writing for GrandPrix.com whilst at university before joining the Official Formula 1 Magazine as a staff writer in 2002 until its discontinuation in February 2004, when he went on to freelance work.

Buxton became the press officer for the inaugural GP2 Series in 2005, and was later promoted to Director of Communications. In 2008 he became editor of the GPWeek virtual magazine, and in 2009 he started providing live commentary for the GP2 Series and GP2 Asia Series for Formula One Group.

In 2010, Buxton joined Speed, an American motorsports cable channel which was owned by Fox Sports, as their Formula 1 pit-lane reporter until they lost the rights to broadcast F1 at the end of 2012, which Buxton claimed he found out about through posts by Speed Channel colleagues on Twitter. In 2013, the American broadcasting rights for Formula 1 went to NBC Sports, where he resumed his role as pit-lane reporter, as well as later joining NBC's broadcast team for the IndyCar Series, until 2017.

In a Sky Sports F1 interview in December 2017, Buxton supported the changes Liberty Media had made whilst running Formula 1, despite these changes having lost him his job at NBC Sports.

Buxton returned to Formula 1 in an official capacity in 2018, becoming Formula One Group's first Digital Presenter. He hosted a number of features on F1 TV and the official F1 YouTube channel, including Weekend Warm-Up (formerly Paddock Pass), a feature he carried over from NBC.

Buxton has appeared in all seven seasons of the Netflix documentary series Formula 1: Drive to Survive based on the 2018, 2019, 2020, 2021, 2022, 2023, 2024 and 2025 Formula 1 seasons, giving his opinions on the events covered in the series. He is often used by the show's producers as a reference point for new viewers, explaining racing concepts and terminology for non-motorsport fans. Many of his sound bites have become memes in the Formula 1 community, a fact Buxton is aware of.

In 2019, Buxton released his first book, titled: My Greatest Defeat: Stories of Hardship and Hope from Motor Racing's Finest Heroes, featuring illustrations from Giuseppe Camuncoli. In 2024, Buxton released his second book Grand Prix: An Illustrated History of Formula 1.

On 14 January 2025, Fox Sports announced Buxton as its lead commentator for its first season covering the IndyCar Series in 2025, alongside James Hinchcliffe and Townsend Bell as race analysts. As a result, Buxton left his roles with F1TV.

On 10 February 2026 Buxton started the F1 podcast "Up To Speed" featuring as his co-hosts David Coulthard, Naomi Schiff and Jolie Sharpe.

== Filmography ==
Film
Year	Title	Role	Notes	Ref.
2025	F1	Himself	Cameo	

Television
Year	Title	Role	Network	Notes	Ref.
2019–2025	Formula 1: Drive to Survive	Himself	Netflix		

Web
Year	Title	Role	Network	Notes	Ref.
2018–2022	Paddock Pass	Himself	F1TV	2018, 2019, 2020, 2021, and 2022 season.	

== Games ==
Year	Title	Type	Platform	Developer	Ref.
2020	F1 2020	Sport	PlayStation, Xbox and PC	Codemasters	
2021	F1 2021	Sport	PlayStation, Xbox and PC	Codemasters and EA Sports	
2022	F1 22	Sport	PlayStation, Xbox and PC	Codemasters and EA Sports	

Preceded by Leigh Diffey	Television voice of the Indianapolis 500; 2025–current	Succeeded by incumbent
