= Todd Harris =

American sports announcer and reporter

- Born: June 4, 1970 (age 56); Los Angeles, California, U.S.
- Education: BA Brigham Young University MA St Marys University, London UK
- Occupations: Sports announcer and reporter

Todd Harris (born June 4, 1970) is an American sports announcer and reporter for NBC Sports, currently focusing on Olympic and extreme sports.

== ESPN ==
Harris is a graduate of Brigham Young University with a bachelor's degree in communications and broadcast journalism, as well as a Masters degree from St Mary's University in London in International Sports Journalism. Harris' sports media career began in 1991 with ESPN. While employed there through 2007, his workload mainly consisted of college football, the X Games, and IndyCar, which included the role of lap-by-lap announcer for ABC's coverage of the 2005 Indianapolis 500.

Harris gained notoriety at a young age as the 15 year host of ESPN's coverage of the World's Strongest Man, hosting alongside 4x champion Bill Kazmeier. Harris was also given high profiled jobs with Hall of Famers Keith Jackson and Dan Fouts on the ABC college football game of the week.

== Turner Sports ==
From 1998 through 2004, Harris contributed to Turner Sports' coverage of the NBA playoffs and the 1998 Winter Olympics.

== CBS Sports Network ==
During the 2011 college football season, Harris served as a play-by-play announcer for CBS Sports Network

Harris was announced as the new lead play-by-play voice of the SailGP world tour. He debuted in Bermuda in April 2021 with his contract with SailGP running through 2022. He would announce the series with seasoned sailors Freddie Carr and Stevie Morrison. Aly Vance would serve as an on course reporter. Shows aired in 175 countries and in the US on CBS Sports Network.

== NBC Sports ==
Harris joined NBC Sports in 2009. NBC currently uses Harris in a wide variety of assignments. He, and broadcast partner Todd Richards received high marks for their coverage of Shaun White's Gold medal final run in Pyeongchang, South Korea at the 2018 Olympic Winter Games.

Harris has also acted as host for the Tour de France and the network's coverage of the annual IronMan event in Kailua Kona, Hawaii. Todd Harris was the main play-by-play announcer for NBC's venture with both the World Series of Fighting and the Pro Fight League.

Starting in 2021, Harris splits the lead commentating duties with Leigh Diffey doing Supercross on NBCSN with Ricky Carmichael, Daniel Blair, and Will Christien.

== Personal life ==
His son is Brigham Harris, a reporter at ABC affiliate WWSB-TV in Sarasota, Florida.
