= Bobby Gerould =

American sports multimedia personality

Bobby Gerould is an American sports multimedia personality. Gerould was most visible as a pit reporter for World of Outlaws sprint car races telecast on CBS Sports Network, ESPN, Speed, and TNN. In his career, Bobby has been employed in some capacity by nearly every major sanctioning body of American auto-racing, including AMA, ASA, CART, IndyCar, King of the West, NARC, NASCAR, National Sprint Tour, NHRA, SCCA, TORC, USAC, and the World of Outlaws.

Gerould was also the public address announcer at Thunderbowl Raceway in Tulare, California from 1997 through 2022. His voice is featured on the video game, Ratbag World of Outlaws Sprint Cars.

Gerould's "life-study" and passion is basketball player evaluation. Gerould owns HoopObsession.com. He is frequently a guest on sports-talk radio, and television, leaned on for his knowledge of the NBA (specifically the NBA Draft). Gerould spent two seasons working full-time for the Sacramento Kings as a radio host, and TV sideline reporter. Bobby is the son of Gary Gerould, the "voice" of the Sacramento Kings for over 38 years.

The multi-faceted Gerould is also a DJ and emcee who hosts the live-streamed, Soulful and Funky Show.

== Early years ==
Gerould grew up in Sacramento, California. He attended his first basketball game at just a few weeks old. Gerould's father Gary worked as a sportscaster for the local NBC affiliate. This led father and son to attend Sac State games regularly. Bobby 'grew up' in the local Northern California sports scene. He watched the races his father announced every weekend at dirt race tracks. Through observation and from constantly being in a sporting environment, Bobby began carving out ideas for his media career.

== Sacramento State University ==
With proximity to home being a major consideration, Gerould decided to attend Sacramento State University. In 1986 Bobby had little desire to become a television announcer. Instead Gerould focused on doing public address interviews at sprint car races, while working side gigs as a DJ for house parties, wedding receptions, and special events. All the while, Gerould was taking classes in his major communication studies, and keeping statistics for the Hornet's Men's Basketball team under Coach Joey Anders.

== Professional media career ==
- Gerould has been the voice of the Louie Vermeil classic sprint and midget car race since the inaugural event.
- 1993-95 Sacramento Kings Broadcast Team. Pre-Game radio host. In-arena video host. TV sideline reporter. Post Game radio host. Public Address Announcer.
- 1995 Knoxville Nationals (First ever LIVE broadcast of Knoxville Nationals - TNN - TV Pit reporter.
- 1998 ProTruck Racing Series - TNN - TV Pit reporter.
- 1998 - IRL at Charlotte - TNN - TV Pit Reporter
- 1999-2000 NHRA Drag Racing - TNN - TV Pit reporter.
- 2002 - Voice on Ratbag World of Outlaws Sprint Cars video game.
- 2003 World of Outlaws - TV Pit Reporter - Speed.
- 2004-06 United States Auto Club (USAC) Western Media Coordinator.
- 2007 World of Outlaws - TV Play by Play - ESPN2
- 2007-10 World of Outlaws - TV Play by Play - Speed
- 2011–2012 World of Outlaws pit reporter - Speed
- 2013 - Play by play / Host of TORC Off Road Championship - Speed (Fox Sports)
- 2013–2017: Reporter, World of Outlaws on CBS Sports Network.
- 2018: Inducted into Calistoga Speedway Hall of Fame.
