= Lindy Thackston =

American reporter and anchor

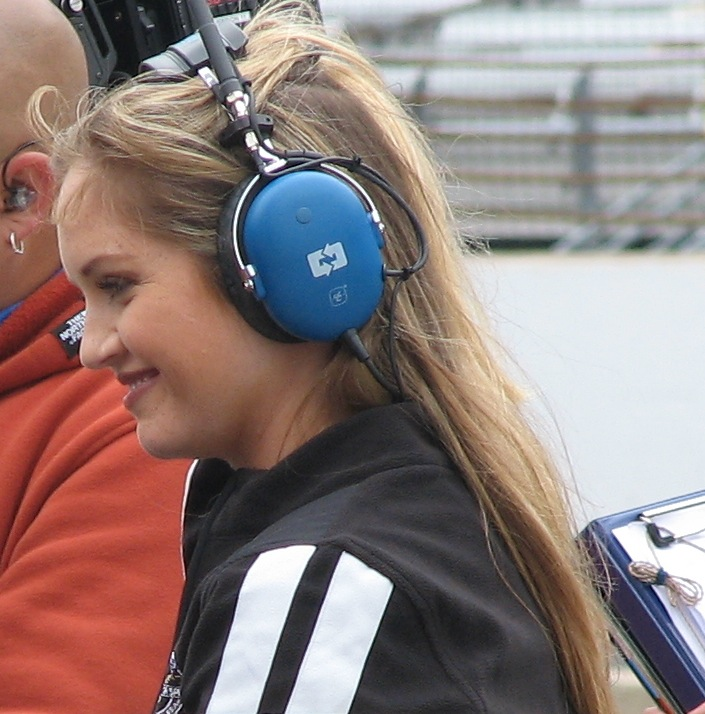
- Thackston at the 2009 Indianapolis 500 Pole Day.
- Born: Lindy Thackston Hogue; Frankfort, Indiana
- Education: Frankfort High School
- Alma mater: Purdue University
- Occupation(s): Anchor; Reporter
- Years active: 2000s–present
- Spouse: Christian Hogue
- Children: 1

Lindy Thackston Hogue is an American reporter and anchor. She has worked as a trackside and pit lane reporter for Versus coverage of the IndyCar Series, as well as college football, and has worked for various television stations over the course of her career. Since October 2016, Thackston has co-anchored the morning newscast on Fox affiliate WXIN with Scott Jones.

== Biography ==
Thackston is from Frankfort, Indiana. She has one brother. Thackston attended Frankfort High School until she moved to Frankfort Christian Heritage School after completing her sophomore year. She graduated in 1999. Thackston graduated from Purdue University with a degree in broadcast journalism in 2002. The previous year, Thackson's interest in American Open Wheel Racing was enhanced when she served as an Indy 500 Princess in May 2001, having spent her childhood listing to the sport via radio. She worked for Southern Illinois television station WSIL-TV for two years. Thackston later worked for First Coast News in Jacksonville, Florida. She stated her favorite news item was about a series of date-rape drugs in 2006. It won Thackston two Edward R. Murrow awards and a Gannett Award.

She hosted a program on the United States' sailing cup competition called Quest for the Cup on HDNet in October 2007. For its 2008 season, the American Le Mans Series asked Thackston if she had an interest in becoming a pit lane reporter which she accepted. She was working for Versus and became their pit lane reporter for the channel's coverage of the IndyCar Series in March 2009 and moved to Orlando, Florida. Thackston was an occasional host for the channel's IndyCar Series coverage. She also worked as a college football sideline reporter for Versus. Thackston served as a stand-in host for Versus' show The Daily Buzz, and worked for the Big East Conference's website as a host of a weekly review program during the men's football and basketball season. She relocated to Indianapolis for the start of the 2011 IndyCar Series, meaning she was no longer able to do college football work for Versus.

Thackston left the channel in 2012 and went to perform social media work for Ed Carpenter Racing. She was replaced by former driver Townsend Bell. Thackston has also served as a trackside reporter for Indianapolis Motor Speedway's public announcement system, and has been involved with the morning newscast on Fox affiliate WXIN since October 2013. On October 10, 2016, she was made co-anchor alongside Scott Jones, replacing the outgoing Kristin Kane.

She married her husband Christian Hogue, who worked as a crew member for various IndyCar teams including Ed Carpenter Racing, in January 2014. They have a son. In May 2020 she announced she was diagnosed with colorectal cancer, and would undergo chemotherapy and radiotherapy.
