= Brienne Pedigo =

American sports reporter

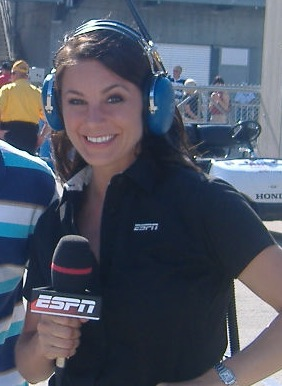
- Pedigo at the Indianapolis Motor Speedway in 2007.
- Occupations: Journalist; reporter
- Notable credits: IRL; ESPN
- Spouses: Tyler Christopher (m. 2008; div. 2021) Cory Williams (m. 2021)
- Children: 2

Brienne Pedigo is an American auto racing pit reporter, formerly employed by ESPN and ESPN on ABC for the Indy Racing League and currently working for the Motor Racing Network as pit reporter.

== Career ==
In 2007, Pedigo took over as a pit reporter for Jamie Little, who moved to ESPN's NASCAR coverage. She was formerly a pit reporter for The Outdoor Channel's USAC sprint and midget car races, and a reporter for CBS' coverage of the NCAA Final Four. In 2022, she joined the Motor Racing Network as a pit reporter for the NASCAR Cup Series.

== Personal life ==
Her father, Gary, was the owner of Pedigo Chevrolet in Camby, Marion County, Indiana (now part of Indianapolis), and was a former joint owner of Panther Racing, an IndyCar Series team.

Pedigo and General Hospital star Tyler Christopher publicly announced their engagement in October 2006. Pedigo and Christopher married September 27, 2008. The couple had their first child, Greysun James Christopher on October 3, 2009. In October 2014, it was announced that Christopher and his wife were expecting their second child due in May 2015. On May 3, 2015, Christopher confirmed on his official Twitter that Pedigo had given birth to a baby girl, Boheme. Pedigo filed for divorce in February 2019. Pedigo has since married singer-songwriter Cory Williams.
