= Rick DeBruhl =

American television announcer

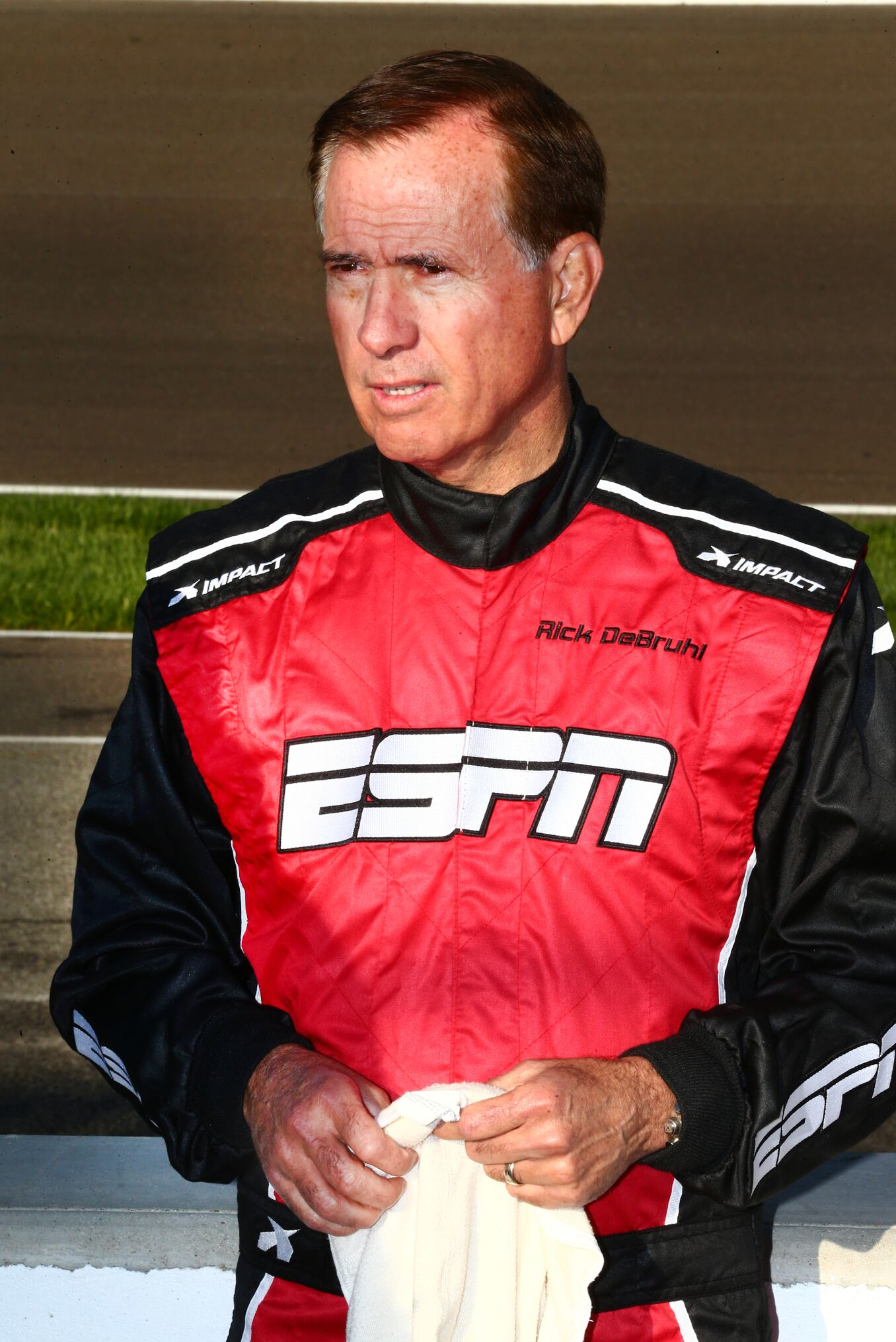
- DeBruhl in 2016
- Born: Richard DeBruhl; June 22, 1955 (age 71); Canoga Park, California, U.S.
- Education: California Polytechnic State University
- Occupation: Television announcer
- Known for: IndyCar and NASCAR on ESPN commentator

Richard DeBruhl (born June 22, 1955) is an American auto racing and automobile auction commentator. He is the TV voice of the Barrett Jackson collector car auctions on the A&E Networks. DeBruhl previously worked in radio before becoming a television personality and journalist for the NBC affiliate in Phoenix, Arizona. His motorsports work began on ESPN in 1988 and lasted for nearly thirty years.

== Biography ==
DeBruhl grew up in Canoga Park, California and graduated from California Polytechnic State University at San Luis Obispo with a degree in journalism. He later received a Master's in Journalism from the University of Missouri. He began his career at KATY Radio in San Luis Obispo, CA, then moved into television at KCOY-TV in Santa Maria, CA. He is married with two sons.

== Career ==
As of 2020 Rick DeBruhl covers the Barrett Jackson collector car auctions for the A&E Networks (The History Channel and FYI,). He previously worked as a pit reporter for ESPN covering the IndyCar Series airing on ABC. He also worked as an American local television sportscaster, reporter and anchor, working with the NBC affiliate KPNX-TV from 1978 to 2009.

DeBruhl began his work with ESPN in 1988, after writing freelance articles for the Detroit-based publication Autoweek. Beginning in 1988 DeBruhl worked on coverage of various forms of racing including International Motor Sports Association (IMSA), Trans-Am Series, Formula One, Champ Car, off-road, Superbike racing and NASCAR. He also previously hosted the Thursday Night Thunder anthology series. In 2002, he moved to Speed (TV channel) as the play-by-play voice for Formula One and began covering the Barrett-Jackson Collector Car Auctions. DeBruhl returned to ESPN in 2009 as a pit reporter for their Verizon IndyCar Series coverage as well as selected American LeMans Series events. He would later also serve as a substitute pit reporter for the network's NASCAR coverage at the standalone NASCAR Nationwide Series races such as Montreal. DeBruhl would work for ESPN until 2018, when the network experienced financial problems and lost their television rights for IndyCar and the Indianapolis 500 to NBC.

== Awards ==
DeBruhl has won numerous awards for reporting including three Rocky Mountain Emmy Awards. He also received awards from the Arizona Press Club, Arizona Associated Press, the Arizona chapter of the American Women in Radio and Television (Reporter of the Year award in 1999), and Arizona State University (Diversity award in 2006). DeBruhl was also inducted into the National Academy of Television Arts and Science's Silver Circle in 2001.

== Books ==
DeBruhl has written two books, Communicating at the Right Speed: 52 Ways to Fix Your Professional Communication Troubles and The Insider's Guide to Media Training: 99 Tips to Survive Your Interview in the Digital Age (with Kevin Riggs).
