= Racer (magazine) =

US motorsports magazine

- Cover of issue #330 (September–October 2024), featuring March 881
- Editor-in-Chief: Laurence Foster
- Former editors: John Zimmerman
- Categories: Motor sport
- Frequency: 8 time per year
- Founder: Paul F. Pfanner
- Founded: 1992
- First issue: May 1992; 34 years ago
- Company: Racer Media & Marketing Inc.
- Country: US
- Based in: Irvine, California
- Language: English
- Website: www.racer.com
- ISSN: 1066-6060

Racer (stylized RACER) is an American motorsports magazine based in Irvine, California. Owned by Racer Media & Marketing, it is published six times a year. It has a news and commentary website Racer.com along with The RACER Channel on YouTube and the Racer Network (formerly MAVTV) on television.

== Overview ==
The magazine has feature articles relating to most of the world's major auto racing series, including NASCAR, Formula One, the IndyCar Series, the WeatherTech SportsCar Championship, NHRA Drag Racing, and the World Rally Championship, as well as local racing categories and feeder series. The magazine includes extensive photography of race vehicles. In addition to the magazine, Racer also has a custom publishing division, that has produced SportsCar magazine for the Sports Car Club of America.

In June 2019, Racer Media & Marketing acquired Vintage Motorsport magazine.

== History ==
The magazine debuted with the May 1992, issue with the cover story about the "engine war" in the CART, and the cover photo was a head-on shot of Emerson Fittipaldi’s Penske-Chevrolet Indycar by Michael C. Brown. The magazine was launched by Paul F. Pfanner, and originally published by Racer Communications, Inc. which was a sister company of Pfanner Communications, Inc. that published SportsCar magazine for the Sports Car Club of America and Champ Car magazine. Racer's founding Publisher was Bill Sparks and the founding Editor was John Zimmermann. Jeff Zwart was also a co-founder. It was listed as one of the "12 best magazines in America" by M.I.N. Magazine in 1999. The company and the title was later purchased by London-based Haymarket Publishing (now Haymarket Media Group) in early 2001. The magazine was sold back to its founders in 2012 and is now run by Racer Media & Marketing Inc. Laurence Foster remained editor-in-chief. Sparks serves as the Publisher and company COO. The main investors of the magazine also returned to the publication, including Chris Dyson and Rob Dyson.

== Publishers ==
- 1992: Racer Communications, Inc.
- 2001: Haymarket
- 2012: Racer Media & Marketing Inc.
