= Leigh Diffey =

Australian sports commentator

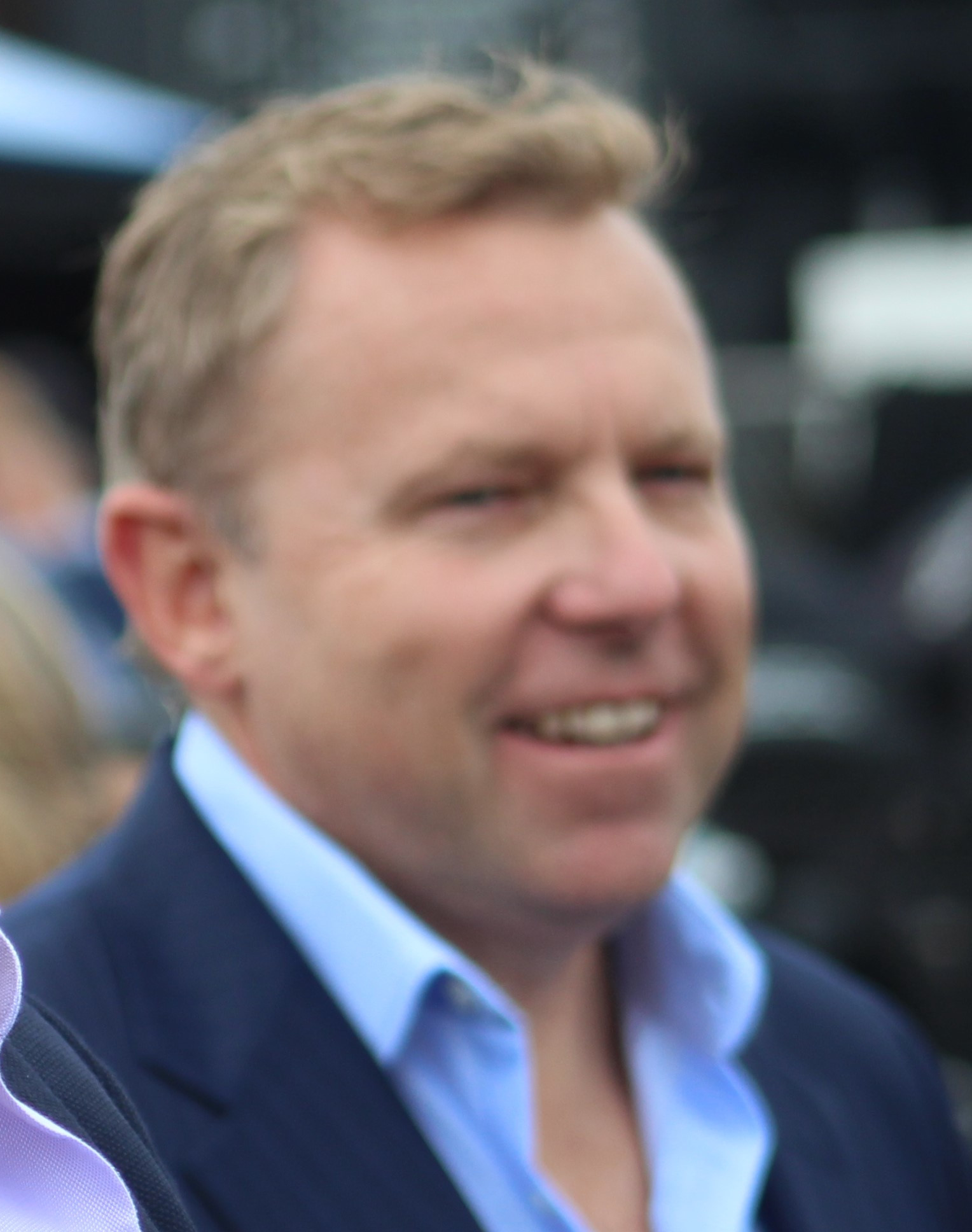
- Diffey at the 2018 ABC Supply 500
- Born: 3 March 1971 (age 55); Brisbane, Queensland, Australia
- Citizenship: United States; Australia
- Occupation: Sports commentator
- Years active: 1995–present
- Employer: NBC Sports
- Known for: NASCAR on NBC; Olympics on NBC

Leigh Diffey (born 3 March 1971) is an Australian-American auto racing and track and field commentator. He is best known for being the lead play-by-play announcer for much of NBC Sports' motorsports coverage, currently calling NASCAR Cup Series on USA Sports, IMSA sports car races for the network and AMA Supercross. Before this, he was the lead voice of NBC's Formula One and IndyCar Series coverage. Diffey has also worked play-by-play for NBC's coverage of the Summer and Winter Olympic Games, most notably becoming the network's lead track and field sportscaster prior to the 2020 Summer Olympics in Tokyo, Japan.

Diffey's broadcasting career began by calling motorcycle races in his home country. His career has included stints with Network Ten in Australia and the BBC in the United Kingdom covering various forms of motorsport. In the United States, Diffey joined Speed Channel in 2003 before moving to NBC when Formula One's US television rights were transferred to the network in 2013.

== Early career: Network Ten and BBC ==
Diffey grew up in Queensland, Australia, where he briefly raced motorcycles with his friend Daryl Beattie, who eventually became a professional motorcycle racer. Diffey worked as a physical education teacher at Ipswich Grammar School. Meanwhile, he began working in motorsports broadcasting; his first job came in 1990 at the age of 19, calling Ipswich Motorcycle Club racing at Tivoli Raceway. In 1995 he left his teacher job to pursue a full-time career in sports television.

After two years with the Australian Super Touring Championship broadcasting team for Network Ten, Diffey became the V8 Supercars lead announcer in 1997, partnering with Greg Rust, Barry Sheene, Bill Woods and Mark Oastler. He also covered the 12 Hours of Sebring, an event for he would call for a total of ten years.

Diffey moved to the United Kingdom in 2000, where he worked as the lead commentator of the Superbike World Championship and presented coverage of the World Rally Championship for the BBC, working alongside Steve Parrish and Suzi Perry.

== 2003–2012: Speed Channel and return to Network Ten ==
In 2001, Diffey moved to the US to cover the American-based open-wheel racing CART series, while still working for the BBC. Two years later in 2003, Diffey made a full-time move to the States when he was hired by Speed Channel, which later simply became "Speed". At Speed, Diffey was the play-by-play announcer for the network's coverage of the Speed World Challenge, the American Le Mans Series, the Rolex Sports Car Series, the Rolex Grand-Am Cup, the SCCA Trans-Am Series, and a regular anchor of The Speed Report and Speed Center. Diffey occasionally filled in for Speed commentator Bob Varsha during the network's Formula One broadcasts. He also commentated selected rounds of the AMA Superbike and AMA Motocross Championships. Diffey also served as a pit reporter for NASCAR practice and qualifying sessions.

Diffey also worked with Speed to call several sports car races during his tenure with the network, including the 24 Hours of Daytona and the 24 Hours of Le Mans. During this time, Diffey also worked with Network Ten in Australia as a regular host for the network's nightly sports wrap, Sports Tonight. He also covered other two other sports for the Australian network: sailing, hosting coverage of the Sydney to Hobart Yacht Race, and golf, which he covered for five years. In 2011 alone, he covered no fewer than sixteen individual divisions of motorsport on Speed.

== 2013–present: NBC Sports ==
=== Motorsports ===
==== Formula One and IndyCar ====
In November 2012, NBC Sports announced that Diffey would join its network to become the play-by-play announcer for its broadcasts of both Formula One and IndyCar events starting in 2013. Diffey called the day of the announcement "one of the best days of my life. People have been so complimentary." The announcement named David Hobbs and Steve Matchett as the analysts who would work alongside him for the Formula One broadcasts. In December 2015, Diffey, Hobbs and Matchett were given an Honorable Mention in a list of Best Broadcast Teams of the year published on the Sports Illustrated website SI.com.

On two occasions, Diffey covered both series on the same day. On 23 August 2015, he called the Belgian Grand Prix from NBC's base in Stamford, Connecticut, before he and Matchett traveled to Pocono Raceway for the ABC Supply 500. Likewise, on 3 September 2017, Diffey called the Italian Grand Prix in Connecticut and then traveled to Watkins Glen International for the IndyCar Grand Prix at The Glen. Diffey's open-wheel focus shifted solely to IndyCar in 2018 when the US Formula One television rights were transferred to ESPN, and they chose to take commentary from Sky Sports instead of making their own.

==== NASCAR ====
Diffey was one of several recurring co-hosts of NASCAR America, a weekday NBCSN program dedicated to NASCAR. While he had covered NASCAR practice and qualifying sessions with Speed, it was not until his tenure with NBC that he made his NASCAR debut as a play-by-play announcer for a race, covering the Xfinity Series (NXS) at Mid-Ohio Sports Car Course on 15 August 2015. After calling the race, Diffey spoke of the experience as "a thrill...I've been a NASCAR fan and dabbled in it, and for that to be my first race was something else." He also commentated the Richmond, Dover, and Kansas NXS races.

Diffey made his Sprint Cup Series broadcasting debut alongside Dale Jarrett at Homestead-Miami Speedway in 2015, leading NBCSN's "Hot Pass" coverage of NASCAR's championship race, which focused solely on the four drivers still eligible for the series championship. Diffey reprised this role with Parker Kligerman in the 2016 Homestead race, and again with Jarrett in 2017, 2018, and 2019.

In August 2017, Diffey served as the lead announcer for NASCAR on NBC's primary coverage of the renamed Monster Energy Cup Series for two races (the I Love New York 355 at The Glen and the Pure Michigan 400), filling in for regular announcer Rick Allen who was working in London with NBC's coverage of the 2017 IAAF World Championships.

On 13 March 2024, it was reported that Diffey would replace Allen in NBC's NASCAR Cup Series booth shortly after the 2024 Summer Olympics. The Indianapolis Star reported on 8 August that Diffey's first race would be the Coke Zero Sugar 400 at Daytona International Speedway. Diffey was officially confirmed by NBC on 20 August as the network's new play-by-play voice for the Cup Series. Consequently, Kevin Lee filled in for him in the IndyCar booth for the rest of the year.

==== IMSA ====
Diffey returned to sports car racing in 2019 as the lead announcer for NBC Sports' coverage of IMSA's WeatherTech SportsCar Championship, beginning with the 2019 24 Hours of Daytona.

==== Motorcycles ====
Diffey began calling the AMA Supercross Championship in 2020, working play-by-play for NBC for the series along with Ralph Sheheen. Diffey took over the lead commentating role replacing Sheheen starting the 2021 season with Ricky Carmichael, Daniel Blair, and Will Christien. He also served as a studio host for the network's MotoGP and Moto2 coverage.

==== Global Rallycross ====
Diffey served as lead announcer for several events of NBCSN's coverage of Red Bull Global Rallycross beginning with the opening event from Fort Lauderdale in the 2015 season. He continued to cover the series for the network until the series folded, doing play-by-play for the final round of the 2017 season from the Port of Los Angeles on 14 October.

==== Dakar Rally ====
Diffey served as the US announcer for the daily world feed highlight broadcast of the Dakar Rally on NBCSN.

=== Other ventures ===
Diffey has worked on NBC's coverage of the Olympic Games, covering luge, skeleton, and bobsled at the 2014 Winter Games in Sochi. NBC executive Sam Flood had expressed interest in having him serve as an announcer outside of motorsports while negotiating his contract with the network, and he prepared Diffey for the Olympics by having him host the Penn Relays and the Luge World Cup. Diffey remarked of serving in the Olympics: "Never in my wildest dreams did I imagine this is where my career would take me. Just working for NBC, that alone made my life. Now going to the Olympics for NBC? I just pinch myself as if to wonder is this really happening?" He returned to the Olympics to cover rowing at the 2016 Summer Olympics in Rio de Janeiro, and also called the same events he had in Sochi at the 2018 Winter Games in Pyongchang.

Beyond the Olympics, Diffey has covered rugby, anchoring studio coverage of Premiership Rugby and doing play-by-play for the Collegiate Rugby Championship. He also covered the Prefontaine Classic in 2018, as well as the 2019 World Athletics Championships.

In 2021, Diffey took over as the NBC track and field commentator, covering both the US Olympic trials and the 2020 Summer Olympics.

At the 2024 Summer Olympics in Paris, Diffey botched the call of the men's 100 metre final, hastily declaring Jamaican Kishane Thompson the winner in a photo finish which found American sprinter Noah Lyles officially winning the gold medal. Diffey took responsibility for the mistake in a social media post the following day, saying, "My eyes [and] instinct told me Kishane Thompson won. Obviously, that wasn't the case. I shouldn't have been so bold to call it, but I genuinely thought he won. I got it wrong."

Diffey makes a cameo in the movie F1 (2025), providing commentary for the film's opening scene at the 24 Hours of Daytona.

== Personal life ==
Diffey obtained his United States citizenship in 2011, explaining, "This country has given me so much, and I felt I needed to give back. That's why I accepted US citizenship. I'm Australian and I'm also American." A former resident of Charlotte, North Carolina, he currently resides in Connecticut with his wife and two children.

Preceded by Allen Bestwick	Television voice of the Indianapolis 500; 2019–2024	Succeeded by Will Buxton
