= Indianapolis 500 firsts =

== Wins, Leaders and Race Competition ==
Year	First	Achiever(s)	Notes
1911	Winning driver	(United States) Ray Harroun	Retired from racing competition upon victory
1911	Winning owner	(United States) Nordyke & Marmon Company	Withdrew from racing competition upon victory
1911	Rear-view mirror mounted, and winning, car	(United States) Marmon Wasp	First entry with rear-view mirror, all international motorsports competition
1913	Rookie winner (excluding first race)	(France) Jules Goux	First to win in first career start, excluding first race
1913	Non-American winner	(France) Jules Goux	
1913	European winner	(France) Jules Goux	
1913	(France) French winner	(France) Jules Goux	
1915	(Italy) Italian winner	(United States) Ralph DePalma	Italian-born DePalma emigrated to America as a child
1916	Multiple-winning owner(s)	(France) Peugeot	Winning owners, 1913, 1916
1916	(United Kingdom) British winner	(United Kingdom) Dario Resta	Italian-born Resta emigrated to Great Britain as a child
1922	Winner from pole position	(United States) Jimmy Murphy	
1922	Winner leading first lap	(United States) Jimmy Murphy	
1922	Driver-Owner winner	(United States) Jimmy Murphy	
1922	Race and Grand Prix winning car	(United States) Duesenberg 1921 GP	Won 1921 French Grand Prix
1923	Two-time winner	(United States) Tommy Milton	Winner, 1921, 1923
1924	Co-winners	(United States) Lora L. Corum (United States) Joe Boyer	Corum starting, Boyer finishing
1924	Repeat-winning owner(s)	(United States) Duesenberg	
1925	Repeat-winning owner(s)	(United States) Duesenberg	
1926	Rain-shortened race winner	(United States) Frank Lockhart	Race concluded by rain at 160 laps, 400 miles (640 km), with Lockhart holding a two lap lead
1936	Three-time winner	(United States) Louis Meyer	Winner, 1928, 1933, 1936
1939	Repeat-winning driver Repeat-winning car	(United States) Wilbur Shaw (Italy) Maserati 8CTF	
1940	Repeat-winning driver Repeat-winning car	(United States) Wilbur Shaw (Italy) Maserati 8CTF	
1946	(England) English winner	(United States) George Robson	English-born Robson emigrated to America as a child
1947	First-and-second-place finish by teammates	(United States) Mauri Rose	Rose victorious
1947	First-and-second-place finish by teammates	(United States) Bill Holland	Holland second
1947	Three consecutive-winning owner	(United States) Lou Moore	
1948	Three consecutive-winning owner	(United States) Lou Moore	
1949	Three consecutive-winning owner	(United States) Lou Moore	
1952	Rookie of the Year award winner	(United States) Art Cross	First awarded in 36th running of the race
1952	Youngest winner	(United States) Troy Ruttman	Winner with 22 years and 80 days
1965	Race and World Championship winner, and in same year	(United Kingdom) Jim Clark	
1965	(Scotland) Scottish winner	(United Kingdom) Jim Clark	Drivers originating from countries within the United Kingdom traditionally operate under British classification
1965	Rear-engined winning car	(United Kingdom) Lotus 38	(United Kingdom) Team Lotus, entrant
1966	Race and Monaco Grand Prix winner	(United Kingdom) Graham Hill	Winner, 1963, 1964, 1965, 1968, and 1969 Monaco Grand Prix
1967	Race and 24 Hours of Le Mans winner, and in same year	(United States) A. J. Foyt	(United States) Dan Gurney, Le Mans teammate and co-driver
1969	Race and Daytona 500 winner	(United States) Mario Andretti	Winner, 1967 Daytona 500
1969	Race and 12 Hours of Sebring winner	(United States) Mario Andretti	Winner, 1967, 1970, and 1972 12 Hours of Sebring
1972	Race and 24 Hours of Daytona winner	(United States) Mario Andretti	Winner, 1969 and 1978 World Championships; First year competed after winning 1972 24 Hours of Daytona
1972	Wing-mounted winning car	(United Kingdom) McLaren M16	Entered by (United States) Roger Penske, driven by (United States) Mark Donohue
1977	Four-time winner	(United States) A. J. Foyt	Winner, 1961, 1964, 1967, 1977
1977	Female qualifier	(United States) Janet Guthrie	Qualified 26th, finished 29th out of 33 drivers
1981	Non-American Fastest Rookie of the Year award winner	(Mexico) Josele Garza	
1987	Oldest winner	(United States) Al Unser	Winner with 47 years and 360 days, Winner, 1970, 1971, 1978, 1987
1989	South American winner	(Brazil) Emerson Fittipaldi	
1989	(Brazil) Brazilian winner	(Brazil) Emerson Fittipaldi	
1990	(Netherlands) Dutch winner	(Netherlands) Arie Luyendyk	
1991	African-American qualifier	(United States) Willy T. Ribbs	Qualified 29th, finished 32 out of 33 drivers
1992	Female Rookie of the Year	(United States) Lyn St. James	Finished 13th
1993	Two-time Race and two-time World Championship winner	(Brazil) Emerson Fittipaldi	Winner, 1989; Winner, 1972 and 1974 World Championships
1995	(Canada) Canadian winner	(Canada) Jacques Villeneuve	Winner, 1997 World Championships
1999	(Sweden) Swedish winner	(Sweden) Kenny Bräck	
2000	(Colombia) Colombian winner	(Colombia) Juan Pablo Montoya	Winner, 2000, 2015, Won 2003 Monaco Grand Prix and won the 24 Hours of Daytona in 2007, 2008 and 2013
2001	Rookie and sophomore winner	(Brazil) Hélio Castroneves	First to win in first two career starts
2002	Rookie and sophomore winner	(Brazil) Hélio Castroneves	First to win in first two career starts
2005	Female leader	(United States) Danica Patrick	Led 19 laps; Lap 192, latest
2006	Final lap lead change	(United States) Sam Hornish Jr.	Overtook (United States) Marco Andretti on the final straight line.
2008	New Zealand winner	(New Zealand) Scott Dixon	
2009	Three females both starting and finishing Race	(United States) Danica Patrick (United States) Sarah Fisher (Venezuela) Milka Duno	Danica Patrick finished 3rd, becoming the highest finishing female in race history.
2011	Winner leading only final lap	(United Kingdom) Dan Wheldon	Took lead from (United States) J. R. Hildebrand on the final lap.
2017	Asian winner	(Japan) Takuma Sato	
2017	(Japan) Japanese winner	(Japan) Takuma Sato	
2018	(Australia) Australian winner	(Australia) Will Power	
2021	Non-American four-time winner	(Brazil) Hélio Castroneves	Winner, 2001, 2002, 2009, 2021
2025	(Spain) Spanish winner	(Spain) Álex Palou	

== Race Average Finishing Speeds ==
Year	Speed; Barrier	Race Winner	Time	Average Speed		Notes
Year	Speed; Barrier	Race Winner	Time	(mph)	(km/h)	Notes
1911	70 mph	(United States) Ray Harroun	6:42:08.92	74.602	129.060	First race
1914	80 mph	(France) René Thomas	6:03:46.12	82.47	132.72	
1922	90 mph	(United States) Jimmy Murphy	5:17:30.79	94.48	152.05	Victory in 1921 French Grand Prix winning car
1925	100 mph	(United States) Peter DePaolo	4:56:39.45	101.127	162.748	First race completed in under 5 hours
1937	110 mph	(United States) Wilbur Shaw	4:24:07.08	113.580	182.789	Last two-seat winning car
1949	120 mph	(United States) Bill Holland	4:07:14.97	121.327	195.257	
1954	130 mph	(United States) Bill Vukovich	3:49:17.27	130.840	210.567	
1962	140 mph	(United States) Rodger Ward	3:33:50.33	140.293	225.780	
1965	150 mph	(United Kingdom) Jim Clark	3:19:05.34	150.686	242.506	
1972	160 mph	(United States) Mark Donohue	3:04:05.54	162.962	262.262	
1986	170 mph	(United States) Bobby Rahal	2:55:43.470	170.722	274.750	First race completed in under 3 hours
1990	180 mph	(Netherlands) Arie Luyendyk	2:41:18.404	185.981	299.307	Currently third-fastest time for 500 miles
2021	190 mph	(Brazil) Hélio Castroneves	2:37:19.3846	190.690	306.886	Currently fastest Indy 500 in average speed

== Qualifications ==
=== Pole Position ===
Year	Speed; Barrier	Driver	Speed		Notes
Year	Speed; Barrier	Driver	(mph)	(km/h)	Notes
1911	N/A	(United States) Lewis Strang	No full lap		First race; grid determined by entry date
1915	90 mph	(United States) Howdy Wilcox	98.90	159.16	First year, grid position determined by qualification speed
1919	100 mph	(France) René Thomas	104.780	168.627	
1925	110 mph	(United States) Leon Duray	113.196	182.171	
1927	120 mph	(United States) Frank Lockhart	120.100	193.282	
1939	130 mph	(United States) Jimmy Snyder	130.138	209.437	
1954	140 mph	(United States) Jack McGrath	141.033	226.971	Engine augmented with nitromethane additive, then legal
1962	150 mph	(United States) Parnelli Jones	150.370	241.997	
1965	160 mph	(United States) A. J. Foyt	161.233	259.479	
1968	170 mph	(United States) Joe Leonard	171.559	276.097	Turbine-engined car
1972	180 mph	(United States) Bobby Unser†	195.940	315.335	17 mph (27 km/h) increase in pole record speed, largest margin to date
1972	190 mph	(United States) Bobby Unser†	195.940	315.335	17 mph (27 km/h) increase in pole record speed, largest margin to date
1978	200 mph	(United States) Tom Sneva	202.156	325.339	Broke one-lap 200 mph qualifying barrier in 1977
1984	210 mph	(United States) Tom Sneva	210.029	338.009	
1989	220 mph	(United States) Rick Mears	223.885	360.308	
1992	230 mph	(Colombia) Roberto Guerrero	232.482	374.144	

†- During time trials, Bill Vukovich II turned his first lap at 185.797 mph (299.011 km/h), to set the one-lap track record, and was the first driver to officially break the 180 mph (290 km/h) barrier. He, however, crashed on his second lap, and did not complete the four-lap qualifying run. Later in the afternoon, Joe Leonard qualified a four-lap average of 185.223 mph (298.088 km/h) to break the four-lap 180 mph (290 km/h) barrier. Later in the day, however, Bobby Unser qualified even faster, over 190 mph (310 km/h), and became the first pole position winner to break 180 mph (290 km/h) and 190 mph (310 km/h) for his four-lap average.

== Miscellenia ==
- 1913: Jules Goux is the first winner to go the full race distance without a relief driver, and is both the first French and European victor. Goux's Peugeot entry is the first to win using wire wheels instead of wooden-spoke wheels.
- 1915: Ralph DePalma is the first Italian-born victor.
- 1919: Victory by state native Howdy Wilcox prompts crowd to sing Back Home Again in Indiana for the first time, immediately after conclusion of the race. Wilcox's Peugeot is owned and entered by the Indianapolis Motor Speedway, the first winning entry to be directly affiliated with the facility itself.
- 1920: Gaston Chevrolet is killed in a race at Beverly Hills and is the first '500' winner to die.
- 1921: Howdy Wilcox is the first driver to finish in first and last place (1919 & 1921).
- 1923: Jimmy Murphy is the first defending winner to lead the first lap.
- 1929: Cliff Woodbury is the first pole winner to finish last (crash on lap 3).
- 1936: Louis Meyer becomes the first driver to drink milk in victory lane. He also becomes the first driver to receive the pace car for his winning effort. The Borg-Warner Trophy makes its first appearance.
- 1946: George Robson is the first English-born victor.
- 1948: The Speedway institutes its own 'Safety Patrol' to replace the Indiana National Guard as policing force for the event, which had served in such capacity since the inaugural race.
- 1949: Local station WTTV provides television coverage of the race during competition for the first time.
- 1950: Walt Faulkner becomes the first rookie to qualify for the pole position.
- 1952: Art Cross becomes the first Rookie of the Year. The Indianapolis Motor Speedway Radio Network broadcasts flag-to-flag coverage of the race for the first time.
- 1958: The front row drivers (Dick Rathmann, Ed Elisian and Jimmy Reece) fail to lead a lap, the only time this has occurred to date.
- 1965: Jim Clark is the first former World Drivers' Champion to win the race, the first driver to win the race en route to winning the Formula 1 World Championship and the first Scottish victor.
- 1966: Rookie Graham Hill, the first English-born victor, wins the race but not the Rookie of the Year award (instead awarded to teammate Jackie Stewart), the only time this has occurred to date. Jim Clark is the first driver to spin and recover twice in the same race.
- 1971: Bettie Cadou becomes the first female reporter to be given a silver credential badge that permits access to the pit and garage areas.
- 1974: The Speedway rescinds its "never on a Sunday" policy, altering a tradition dating to 1911; the race is scheduled to be run, for the first time, on the Sunday before the national observance of Memorial Day, the last Monday of May.
- 1978: The timing and scoring computer system designed by Arthur W Graham III (Indianapolis 500 Director) was first used to accurately track drivers times and simultaneously display race leaders and laps.
- 1980: Tom Sneva becomes the first driver to lead the race after starting from dead last, finishing 2nd.
- 1983: Al Unser and son Al Unser Jr. are the first father and son to compete together in the same race.
- 1984: Michael Andretti becomes the first son of a previous Rookie of the Year award winner (Mario Andretti, 1965) to win the award himself, shared with Colombian Roberto Guerrero.
- 1986: ABC Sports provides flag-to-flag television coverage for the first time.
- 1988: Bill Vukovich III becomes the first third-generation driver to qualify and drive in the race, following his two-time winning grandfather and once second-place finishing father.
- 1992: Al Unser Jr. becomes the first second-generation winner of the race, following his four-time winning father.
- 2002: Hélio Castroneves becomes the first rookie winner to become a multiple-race winner.
- 2005: Danica Patrick becomes the first female driver to lead the race, for a total of 19 laps.
- 2006: Marco Andretti becomes the first third-generation winner of the Rookie of the Year award (Mario Andretti, 1965; Michael Andretti, co-1984).
- 2007: First Indy 500 race with three women competing in the field (Duno, Fisher, Patrick); also the first race where two women were running at the completion of the event (Fisher, Patrick).
- 2009: First Indy 500 race where three females finished the race, (Duno, Fisher, Patrick). Also the highest finish for a woman, 3rd(Patrick).
- 2010: First Indy 500 race with four women competing in the field (Fisher, Patrick, Silvestro, Beatriz); The Rookie of the year it was for the Swiss driver (Silvestro).
- 2017: Takuma Sato of Japan becomes the first Asian-born victor.
- 2018: Will Power becomes the first Australian-born victor.
- 2019: First Indy 500 race broadcast by NBC Sports.
- 2020: First Indy 500 to be run in August.
- 2021: First Indy 500 to have at least 30 cars running at the finish.
