= Dan Wheldon =

British racing driver (1978–2011)

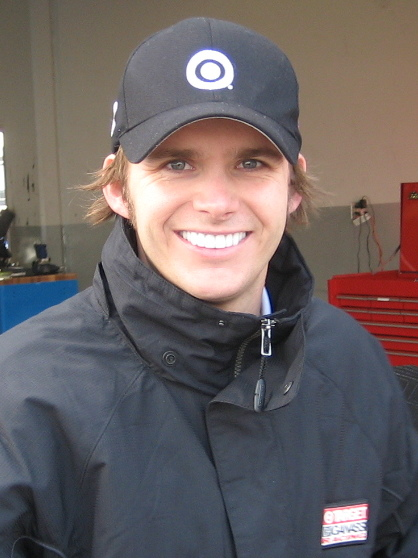
- Wheldon at Daytona in 2008
- Born: Daniel Clive Wheldon; 22 June 1978; Emberton, Buckinghamshire, England
- Died: 16 October 2011 (aged 33); Las Vegas, Nevada, U.S.
- Cause of death: Blunt force trauma sustained at the 2011 IZOD IndyCar World Championship
- Resting place: Calvary Catholic Cemetery, Clearwater, Florida
- Children: 2, including Sebastian

IRL IndyCar Series
- Years active: 2002–2011
- Teams: Panther Racing (2002, 2009–2010); Andretti Green Racing (2003–2005); Chip Ganassi Racing (2006–2008); Bryan Herta Autosport/Sam Schmidt Motorsports (2011)
- Starts: 128
- Wins: 16
- Poles: 5
- Best finish: 1st in 2005

Previous series
- 2005–2008 2001 2000 1999: Grand-Am Rolex Sports Car Series; Indy Lights; Toyota Atlantic Championship; U.S. F2000 National Championship

Championship titles
- 2006 2005, 2011 2005 1999: 24 Hours of Daytona; Indianapolis 500; IndyCar Series; U.S. F2000 National Championship

Awards
- 2003 2011 2019: IndyCar Series Rookie of the Year; IndyCar Series Most Popular Driver (posthumously); Indianapolis Motor Speedway Hall of Fame (posthumously)

Signature
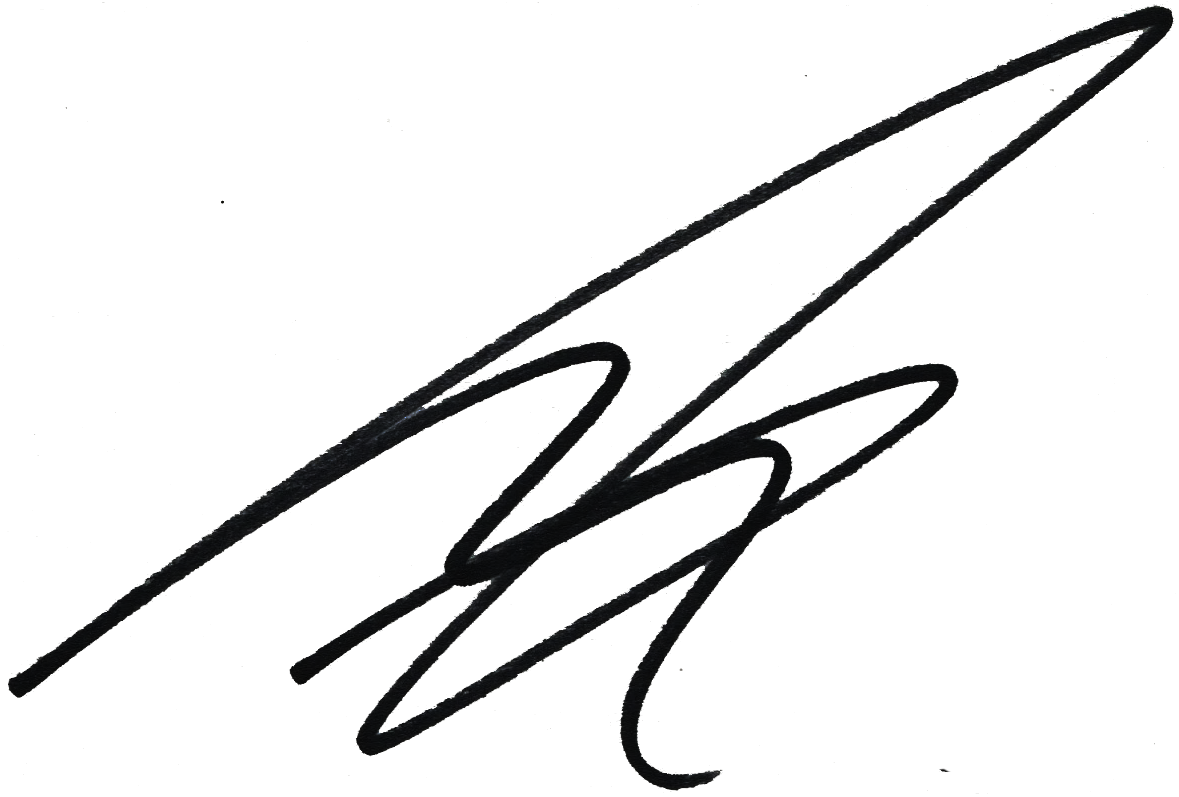

Daniel Clive Wheldon (22 June 1978 – 16 October 2011) was a British motor racing driver who won the 2005 IndyCar Series for Andretti Green Racing (AGR). He won the Indianapolis 500 in 2005 and 2011, and was co-winner of the 2006 24 Hours of Daytona with Chip Ganassi Racing (CGR).

Wheldon began competitive karting at the age of eight and achieved early success, before progressing to open-wheel car racing in the U.S. F2000 National Championship, the Toyota Atlantic Championship and Indy Lights. He began driving in IndyCar with Panther Racing in 2002. The following year, Wheldon moved to AGR, finishing as runner-up in the 2004 championship. He won the drivers' title in 2005 with the record for most victories (including that year's Indianapolis 500) during a season. In the 2006 season, he moved to CGR, tying Sam Hornish Jr. in points but finishing second because of count-back on the number of victories taken by both drivers. During the 2007 and 2008 seasons, Wheldon's form lowered but he won four additional races to place fourth overall in both years.

Wheldon returned to Panther Racing for the 2009 and 2010 seasons, failing to win a race but taking a further four podium results during this period. Wheldon left the team at the conclusion of the season. He drove part-time for Bryan Herta Autosport and later Sam Schmidt Motorsports in the 2011 season. He won his second Indianapolis 500 in May of that year. At the season-ending IZOD IndyCar World Championship at Las Vegas Motor Speedway, Wheldon was killed in a multicar accident, when his car became airborne and collided with a catch fence post, alongside the circuit on the race's eleventh lap. He was 33 years old and the first driver to die in IndyCar competition since Paul Dana in 2006.

== Early and personal life ==
Wheldon was born in the village of Emberton near the town of Olney, Buckinghamshire, England on 22 June 1978. He was the son of plumber and domestic heat electrician Clive Wheldon and his wife Sue. Wheldon was of Irish descent. He had three younger brothers and a sister. Wheldon's family was connected to motorsport; his father had competed in karting from an early age and his mother acted as Clive's timekeeper. He attended Bedford School until he completed his GCSE examinations at the age of sixteen. Wheldon attained good reading grades and excelled in cross-country running, rugby and squash. He was also captain of the school cricket team.

Wheldon married his long-time personal assistant Susie Behm of Armstrong, British Columbia in 2008. They have two children, Sebastian and Oliver, who compete in go-karting events. Their sons have been supported by Andretti Autosport since 2021.

Wheldon was a guest voice over for the television series Hot Wheels Battle Force 5, and assisted in the physics development for Ignite Game Technologies's online simulation racing game Simraceway. He partook in philanthropic activities, such as raising money for Alzheimer's disease research, contributed to the Sam Schmidt Paralysis Foundation, and met unwell children at the Peyton Manning Children's Cancer Hospital in Indianapolis every year. Wheldon was a spokesperson for the National Guard's Youth Challenge Program, which provides services to vulnerable young Americans. He edited and published a coffee table book of photographs of his life, called Lionheart in 2010.

== Junior career ==
Wheldon began go-kart racing at the age of four but did not partake in competitive racing until he was eight due to age limits. He drove a self-built 60cc kart during the intervals before switching to a 100cc kart later on. Wheldon was inspired by racing driver Nigel Mansell, and he was sponsored by All Kart owner Bruno Ferrari and his father helped to better his son's driving ability at Rye House Kart Circuit. After the Royal Automobile Club (RAC) introduced the Cadet category, he won the RAC British Cadet Karting Championship three times in 1988, 1989 and 1990. Wheldon went on to win the British B Junior title driving a Wright chassis in 1992. He was later advised by Mark Rose and Terry Fullerton as he progressed to the international level. Wheldon won the 1995 FIA Formula Ayrton Senna Memorial World Cup at Suzuka with Fullerton's team. Aged seventeen, he progressed to car racing, competing in the Formula Vauxhall Junior Championship for Team JLR in 1996, winning the Brands Hatch, Silverstone and Oulton Park races and taking seven top-three results to finish second overall, following a title duel with Luciano Burti and Tim Mullen.

The following year, Wheldon was fourth in both the British Formula Ford Championship and the European Formula Ford Championship for Andy Welch Racing, with three victories in the British series. He was named a finalist for the McLaren Autosport BRDC Young Driver of the Year Award in 1996 and 1997. Wheldon improved to third in those two series with the Van Diemen team, driving a Mygale in 1998. That year, he finished second in the Formula Ford Festival at Brands Hatch. It was during this period he developed a rivalry with fellow driver and future Formula One World Champion Jenson Button. Wheldon did not have the necessary level of funding from his father and sponsors to further his career in the United Kingdom and progress into either the British Formula 3 International Series or the British Formula Renault Championship.

At the suggestion of his former team principal and car manufacturer Ralph Firman Sr., he flew to the United States in January 1999 to test a Formula Ford 2000 car. Wheldon also observed an Indy Lights and Toyota Atlantic test session for future preparation. His funding was provided by Jayhard/Primus Racing owner Jon Baytos and Van Diemen. He competed in the U.S. F2000 National Championship in 1999 in Jayhard/Primus Racing's Van Diemen Ford RF99 car, achieving six wins and eleven top-ten finishes to become the first British and European series champion at his first attempt. Wheldon's early performance was affected by jet lag from constant travel to the United Kingdom to visit his family and his desire to compete in Formula Three. He stopped doing so after about three months, when Baytos urged him to concentrate on racing. Wheldon was named the series' Rookie of the Year, and was inducted into its Hall of Fame in 2012 as a 1999 graduate.

Wheldon progressed to the 2000 Toyota Atlantic Championship, driving for PPI Motorsports in its No. 3 Swift 008.a vehicle, winning the season-opening Homestead–Miami Speedway round to become the first driver in series history to win on his debut. He won the Laguna Seca race, finishing runner-up in the championship standings with 159 points and a further nine top-ten finishes. Wheldon was named the series' Rookie of the Year. For the 2001 season, Wheldon moved to the PacWest Lights team to compete in the higher-tier Indy Lights Championship. In the No. 1 Lola T97/20-Buick 3800 V6, he won two races in the championship's second half (Gateway Motorsports Park and Road Atlanta) and placed in the top-ten in all twelve events to finish runner-up in the drivers' championship with 149 points. Wheldon was named the 2001 Indy Lights Rookie of the Year.

== IndyCar Series ==
=== 2002–2004 ===
After his objective of obtaining a seat in Championship Auto Racing Teams (later Champ Car World Series) went unfulfilled, Wheldon spent most of 2002 not racing as a result of the economic impact on the United States following the September 11 attacks. He began his association with the rival Indy Racing League (IRL) by joining Panther Racing as its test driver in June 2002. (Note: The Indy Racing League was formed in 1994 as a separate low-cost American-based open-wheel car championship by Indianapolis Motor Speedway president Tony George, who resigned from the board of Championship Auto Racing Teams, in a move called the CART/IRL split.) Wheldon brought money to the team and drove their second car for the final two races of the 2002 season. Wheldon qualified seventh in the No. 15 Dallara IR02 Chevrolet V8 and finished tenth in his first IRL race, the Delphi Indy 300 at Chicagoland Speedway. He came 15th in the season-closing Chevy 500 at Texas Motor Speedway to finish his two-race campaign 36th in the points standings with 35 accrued. When funding for a second Panther Racing car fell through, Andretti Green Racing (AGR) co-owner Kim Green contacted Wheldon in October and asked him to test its IRL car and develop its Honda engine at Homestead–Miami Speedway the following month. Wheldon was signed to be the team's test driver in November as they sought sponsorship to enable his participation in the 2003 season.

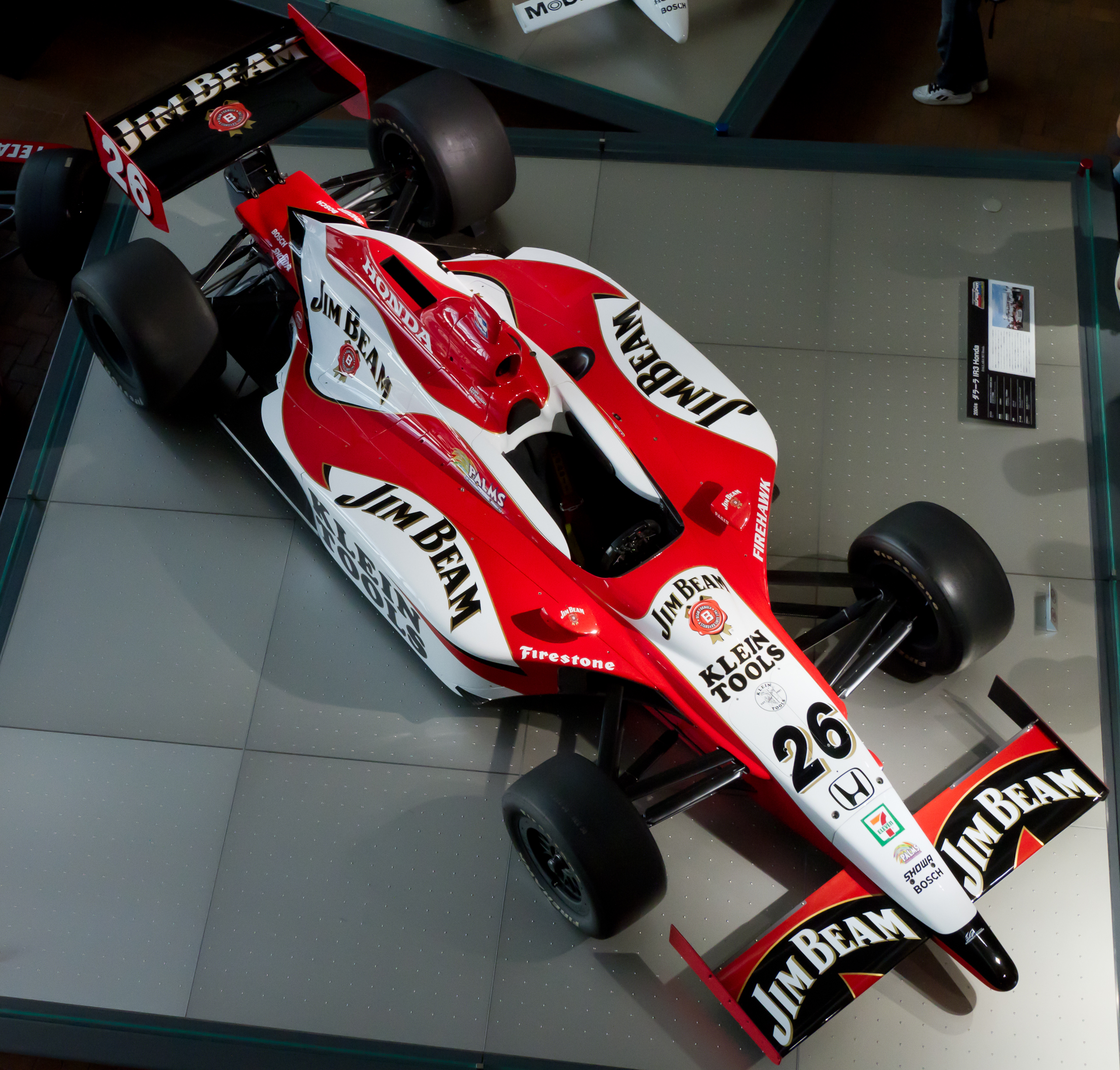
The Dallara IR03 car Wheldon drove to achieve his first IRL victory in the 2004 Indy Japan 300

The lack of sponsorship prevented him from starting the season though he was called up to drive when regular driver Dario Franchitti broke his vertebrae in a motor bike accident in Scotland. In his first race driving the No. 27 Dallara IR-03 Honda HI3R V8 car, at the Indy Japan 300 at Twin Ring Motegi, Wheldon qualified fifth and finished the accident-shortened race seventh. Wheldon qualified fifth for his first Indianapolis 500. Late in the race, he struck a concrete retaining wall and somersaulted into the air before landing upside down, which relegated him to finishing nineteenth. After Franchitti returned, Wheldon was retained as a driver following the retirement of team owner and mentor Michael Andretti. He drove well thereafter with another eight top-ten finishes. Starting tenth at Chicagoland Speedway, Wheldon led for a season-high 38 laps and came fourth. He ended the season finishing third at Texas Motor Speedway, scoring 312 points for 11th in the point standings. Wheldon's performances enhanced his reputation, and he demonstrated an accord with oval track racing that many European drivers lacked. He was awarded the 2003 IndyCar Rookie of the Year, and was voted the 2003 Autosport Rookie of the Year.

Wheldon returned to AGR for the 2004 season. At Phoenix International Raceway, the season's second race, Wheldon won his first career pole position and finished third. He took his first series win at Twin Ring Motegi, leading an event-high 192 laps from pole position. Wheldon qualified second for the Indianapolis 500; he led 26 laps to finish the rain-shortened race third. His second win of the season came at Richmond International Raceway after holding off Team Penske's Hélio Castroneves on the last lap. Wheldon took four top-ten finishes in four of the next six races, before achieving his third series victory in Nazareth Speedway's final motor race to move into second in the drivers' championship. His title challenge to his teammate Tony Kanaan ended in the season's penultimate round at California Speedway, but secured second overall from Buddy Rice at the season-ending Texas Motor Speedway race with 533 points.

=== 2005–2007 ===
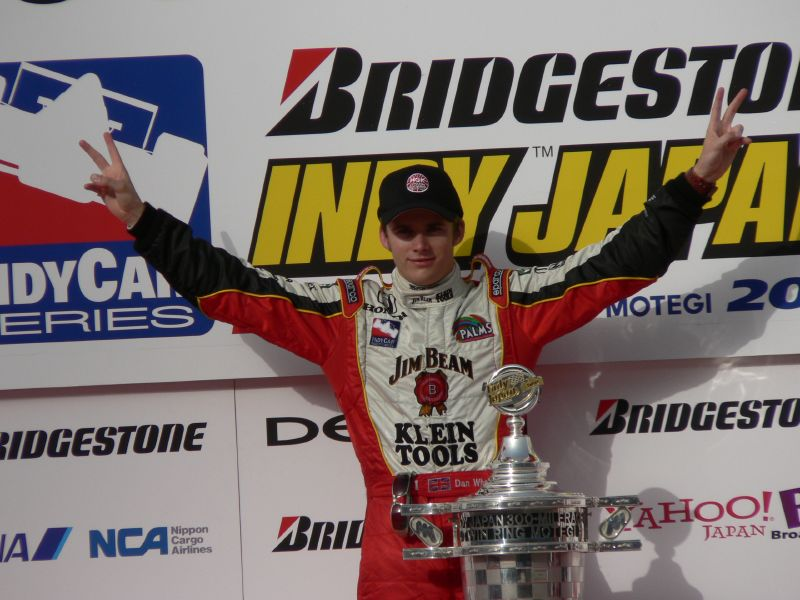
Wheldon celebrating his victory at the 2005 Indy Japan 300

For the 2005 season, Wheldon again drove for AGR. He started from eleventh to lead a race-high 158 of 200 laps of the Homestead–Miami Speedway season-opener to win. After that, Wheldon went on to win consecutive races at the Grand Prix of St. Petersburg (his first and only road course series win), and the Indy Japan 300 for the second successive year. His season highlight was the Indianapolis 500 where he exchanged the lead with Danica Patrick until she slowed due to a lack of fuel. Wheldon made the race-victory overtake with seven laps to go to become the first British driver to win the event since Graham Hill in 1966. He continued to drive consistently in the top six in the next seven races. At Pikes Peak International Raceway, Wheldon took his fifth win of the season (after leading 67 laps) to equal Sam Hornish Jr.'s 2002 record of five victories during a season. Two races later, at Chicagoland Speedway, he led a race-high 88 laps to surpass Hornish's series record with his sixth win of the year. Wheldon won the championship before starting the season's penultimate round by setting a single practice lap of Watkins Glen International. Since the last place finisher scored twelve points, his 102-point lead clinched the title with one race remaining. (Note: Wheldon became the first British driver to win an American open-wheel championship since Nigel Mansell in 1993, and the first driver to win both the Indianapolis 500 and the title since Jacques Villeneuve in 1995.) With a sixth-place finish at the season-closing California Speedway round, Wheldon won the championship with 628 points. He was awarded the 2005 Autosport British Competition Driver of the Year.

When Chip Ganassi Racing (CGR) owner Chip Ganassi was informed of rumours that Wheldon might leave AGR, he engaged in informal discussions with him, which led to an agreement in principle at a meeting in August 2005. His AGR contract expired on 31 October and formal discussions began soon after. CGR resigned Wheldon for the 2006 season and the team changed manufacturers from Panoz to Dallara and engine suppliers to Honda after Toyota withdrew. Wheldon made the switch because he wanted to ensure his stay in the IRL and remain competitive. To begin the season, Wheldon won the Toyota Indy 300 at Homestead–Miami Speedway. At the Indianapolis 500, he qualified in third place, and led a race-high 148 laps before falling to fourth because he had to make a pit stop to replace a puncture on the 183rd lap. Wheldon achieved eight top-ten finishes and two pole positions (at Kansas Speedway and Nashville Speedway), and entered the season's final round at Chicagoland Speedway as one of four drivers in contention for the championship. Wheldon won the race but lost the championship on tiebreak to Sam Hornish Jr, who had won four races to Wheldon's two.

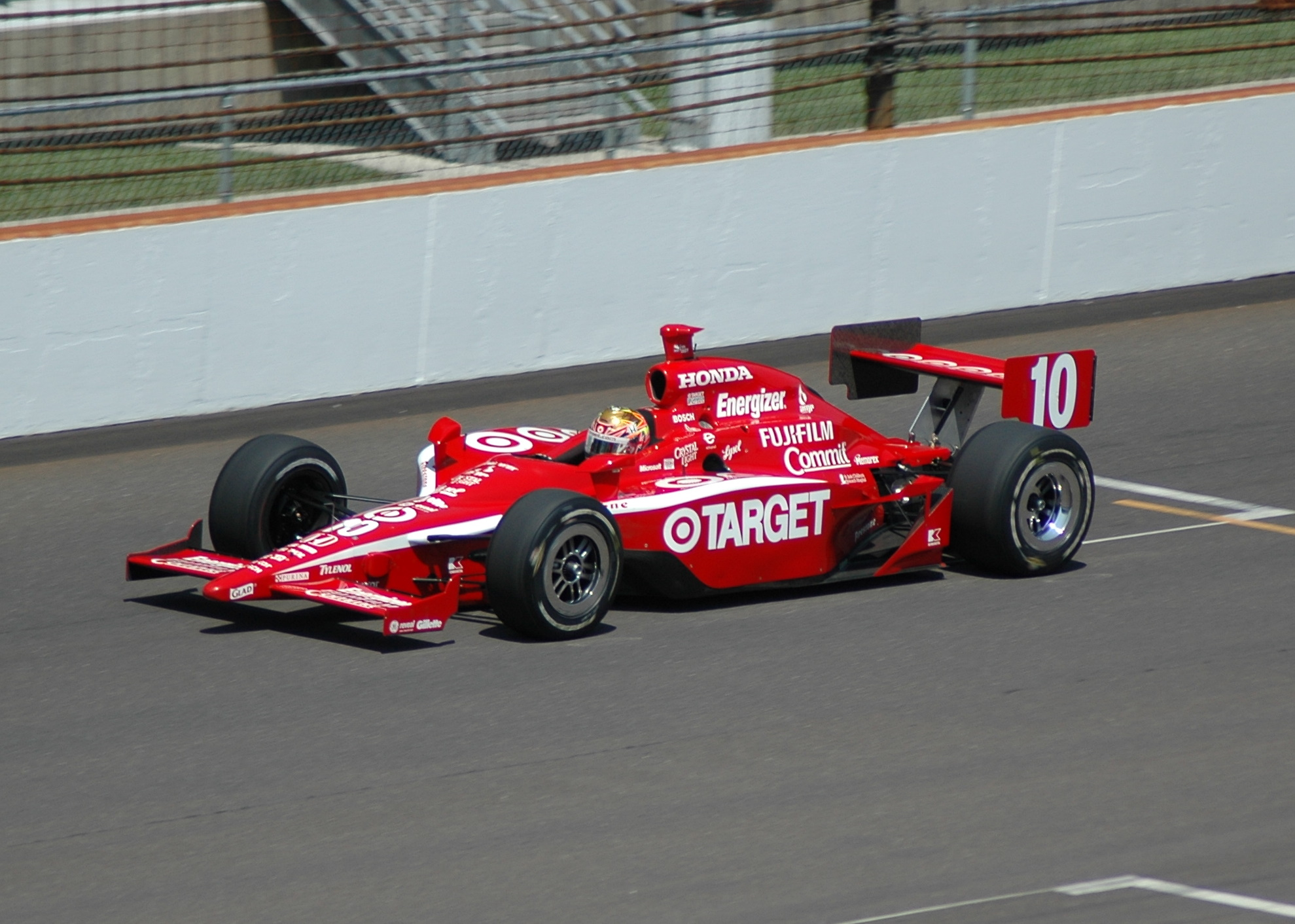
Wheldon practicing for the 2007 Indianapolis 500

Wheldon remained with CGR for the 2007 season. He began the season with pole position at the season-opening XM Satellite Radio Indy 300 at Homestead–Miami Speedway, and led 177 of 200 laps to win his third successive event at the track, a new series record. Wheldon went on to lead a race-high 177 laps to win the Kansas Lottery Indy 300 at Kansas Speedway, his second of the season. After qualifying sixth for the Indianapolis 500, he retired from the rain-shortened race after a late-event collision with Marco Andretti, losing Wheldon the lead of the drivers' championship. His third-place finish in the ABC Supply Company A.J. Foyt 225 at Milwaukee Mile was overshadowed by a physical confrontation with Patrick following a collision on the 88th lap; the two reconciled after a private meeting with IndyCar president Brian Barnhart. The rest of Wheldon's season was modest, with four retirements and two further third-place finishes in the SunTrust Indy Challenge and the Detroit Indy Grand Prix. He came fourth in the final points standings with 466 accrued.

=== 2008–2011 ===
For the 2008 season, Wheldon stayed with CGR. He began the year finishing third at the season-opening Gainsco Auto Insurance Indy 300 at Homestead–Miami Speedway after moving through the field starting from 22nd. Wheldon won the RoadRunner Turbo Indy 300 at Kansas Speedway three races later, becoming IndyCar's first driver to claim two consecutive victories at the track. He started second in the Indianapolis 500 finishing ten places lower in twelfth due to handling problems in the final fifty laps. Wheldon took his second (and final) victory of the season in the Iowa Corn Indy 250 at Iowa Speedway. He donated his winnings to help the victims of the recent tornadoes and flooding which had occurred in Iowa. As IndyCar had become more orientated towards road and street circuits following the merger of it and the Champ Car World Series, his performance diminished in the remaining races since his driving on such tracks were not as good as on ovals. He achieved one further podium finish, a second-place at Nashville Speedway, and five top-seven finishes for fourth in the drivers' championship with 492 points.

Wheldon planned to extend his CGR contract when Chip Ganassi provided him with an offer in May 2008. He decided against doing so when he learnt AGR's Kanaan had begun discussions with the team. Though Kanaan ultimately ended up staying with AGR, Wheldon felt betrayed and began talking to other teams. Wheldon told CGR three months later in Detroit of his decision to leave them at the season's conclusion. On 2 September, CGR announced that Wheldon would be released from his contract at the end of the season as Dario Franchitti left NASCAR and returned to IndyCar. Wheldon returned to the full-time one-car Panther Racing team for the 2009 season following an agreement with his management and team owner John Barnes in mid-August. He struggled to perform in the first three races, but he took his first top-ten finish with a fifth at the Toyota Grand Prix of Long Beach. At the Indianapolis 500, Wheldon qualified in eighteenth and finished second. The rest of Wheldon's season saw him achieve a best finish of fourth at Iowa Speedway and three top-tens. He did not attain those results in seven of the last eight races. He was tenth in the championship standings with 354 points, his lowest finish since he placed eleventh in 2003.

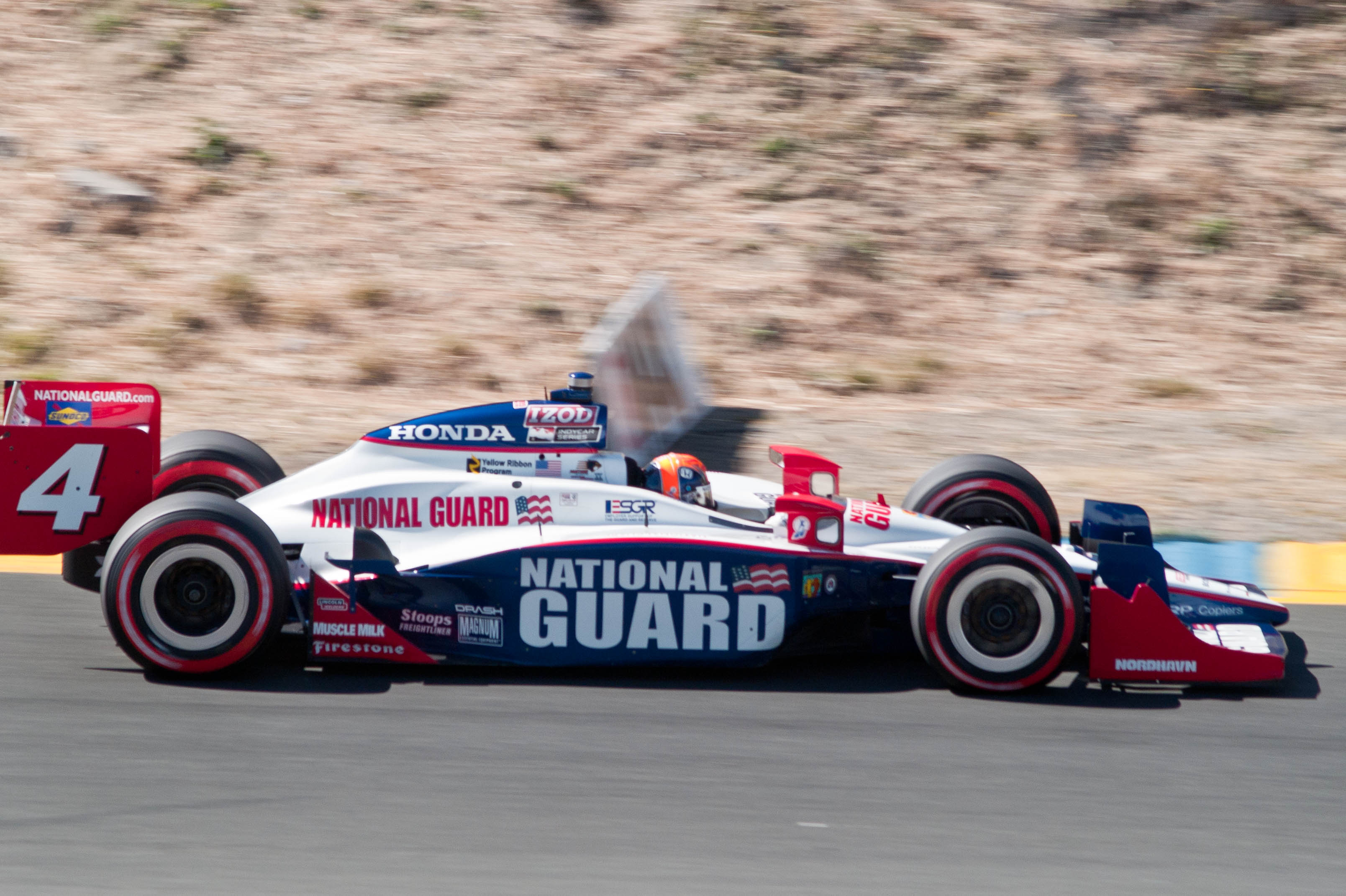
Wheldon practicing for the 2010 Indy Grand Prix of Sonoma

Wheldon remained with Panther Racing for the 2010 season. During the season-opening São Paulo Indy 300, he made contact with Alex Tagliani, which sent him into Kanaan; he recovered to finish fifth. Three races later at the Toyota Grand Prix of Long Beach, Wheldon took a second top-ten result with a ninth. In the Indianapolis 500, Wheldon started from eighteenth. He advanced through the field on pit stop strategy to come second for the second year in a row. Wheldon remained competitive all year; challenging for wins on oval tracks. Despite strong showings, he could not claim a race victory during his time with Panther Racing, which frustrated Barnes. In the Indy Grand Prix of Sonoma at Infineon Raceway (now Sonoma Raceway), Wheldon made contact with Bertrand Baguette's car during a warm-up lap before the start of the event. He flipped upside down and pirouetted several times but emerged unhurt. His best finish of the year was a second place in the Peak Antifreeze & Motor Oil Indy 300 at Chicagoland Speedway. He came ninth at the season-ending Cafés do Brasil Indy 300 at Homestead–Miami Speedway, to rank ninth in the drivers' standings with 388 points.

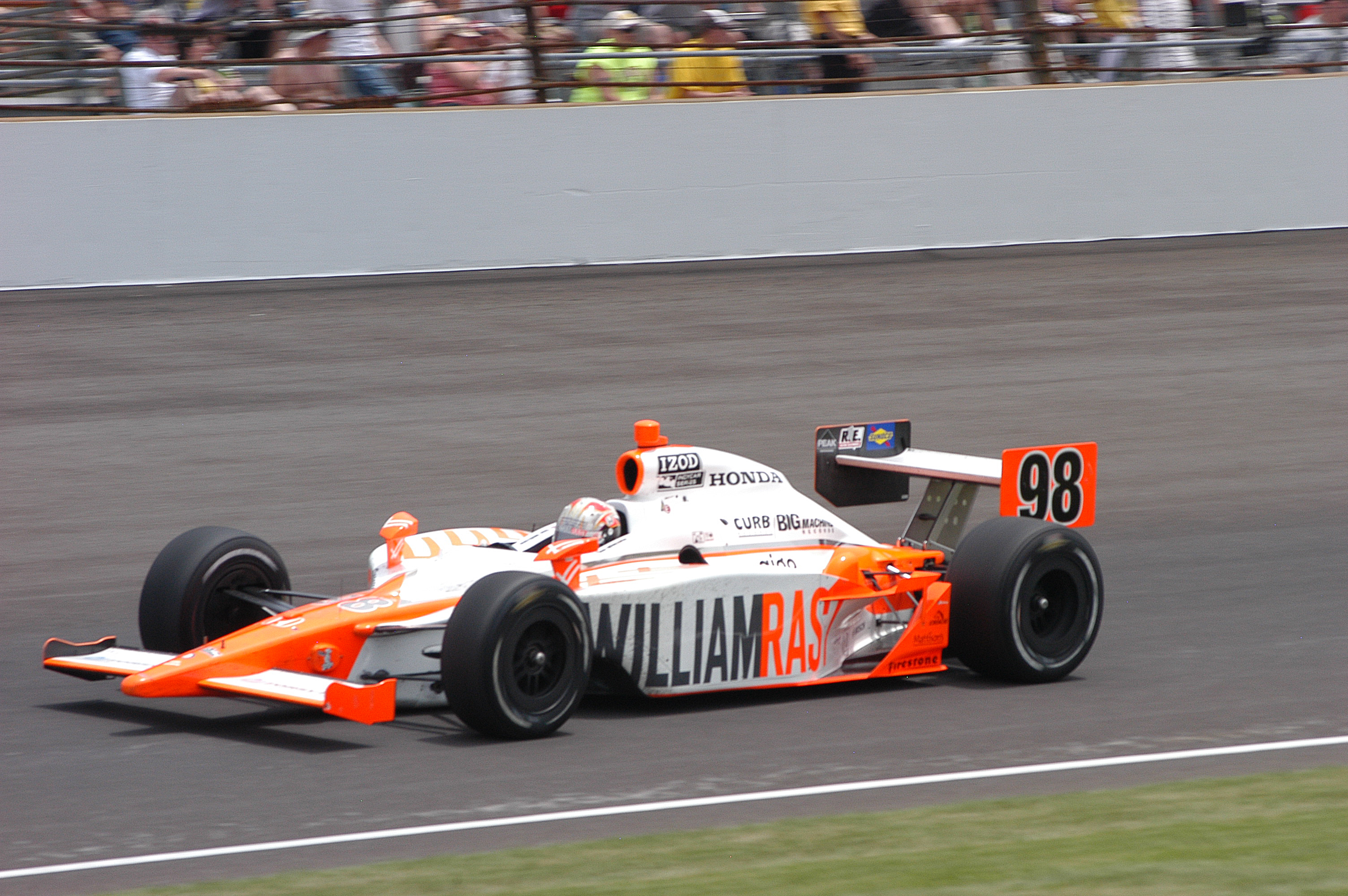
Wheldon competing for Bryan Herta Autosport at the 2011 Indianapolis 500

After the season, Wheldon left Panther Racing because of a lack of sponsorship and the No. 4 car was driven by rookie J. R. Hildebrand. He filed a $383,400 lawsuit against Barnes in Marion County Superior Court on 18 August for late payment of his salary and of his share of earnings from his on-track achievements as well as taxation issues. The two reached a settlement on 1 October. Wheldon did not have a full-time seat for the 2011 season, and he missed the season's first four races as he sought employment with another team to compete in the Indianapolis 500. Talks with several teams, including with Dreyer & Reinbold Racing co-owner Robbie Buhl to share a car with Mike Conway fell through. He then spoke to his friend and former AGR teammate Bryan Herta who offered to assemble a car from his own low-budget operation, Bryan Herta Autosport (BHA), for Wheldon and he agreed. He drove a Dallara car from 2003 leased to Herta by BHA's technical partner Sam Schmidt Motorsports and Curb-Agajanian Motorsports. He qualified in sixth place; in the race, Wheldon was in second place on the final lap when Hildebrand crashed leaving turn four. He took the lead to become the first driver to win the Indianapolis 500 leading only the final lap.

Wheldon's contract expired at midnight on 30 May. He then became a color commentator and pit lane reporter for the cable television channel Versus (now NBCSN) for three IndyCar Series events (Iowa, Texas and Toronto), believing he would not race again in 2011. He impressed viewers with his expertise, quick wit and ease in interacting with other commentators. Wheldon was also employed by IndyCar, car manufacturer Dallara and designer Tony Cotman to test and develop the official prototype model of a new one-specification chassis that debuted at the beginning of the 2012 season. In early October, he drove Tagliani's No. 77 Sam Schmidt Motorsports car for the Kentucky Indy 300 at Kentucky Speedway as preparation for the season-ending IZOD IndyCar World Championship at Las Vegas Motor Speedway. Wheldon qualified in 28th place after failing to set a qualifying time because his car did not pass a technical inspection; he finished fourteenth. On the morning of 16 October, he signed a multi-year contract to replace Patrick at Andretti Autosport from 2012 on. (Note: After Wheldon's death, his car was driven by the 2011 Rookie of the Year James Hinchcliffe.)

== Other racing ventures ==
Wheldon made his endurance racing debut at the 2005 24 Hours of Daytona, sharing the No. 2 Howard-Boss Motorsports Pontiac Crawford DP03 with Dario Franchitti, Marino Franchitti and Milka Duno in the Daytona Prototype (DP) class. Their car finished sixteenth in its class and 33rd overall after Duno crashed with less than six hours to go. In the 2005 off-season, he competed as a wild card entrant in the 2005 Race of Champions, being eliminated from the round of 16 by Sébastien Bourdais. That year, he was offered a test driver role with BMW's Formula One squad by team principal Mario Theissen. He declined when he discovered that he would not be assured a race seat for the 2007 season; he also felt emotionally attached to the United States. Wheldon also turned down an offer to compete for Great Britain in the inaugural A1 Grand Prix season.

In 2006, Wheldon returned to compete in the season-opening 24 Hours of Daytona for Chip Ganassi Racing with Scott Dixon and Casey Mears in the DP class. The trio won overall, completing 734 laps in the No. 02 Riley MkXI Lexus. He returned with the same team for the following year's race, again partnered by Dixon, and they were joined by Memo Rojas. The trio retired after 538 laps because Rojas crashed the No. 2 entry on the saturated track in the race's 21st hour. They were classified 21st in class and 41st overall. Wheldon returned for a fourth time to participate in the 24 Hours of Daytona for Chip Ganassi Racing with Dixon, Alex Lloyd and Salvador Durán. Their car, starting in tenth in its category and overall, finished 44th overall (eighteenth in its class) after it retired with 515 laps completed due to sustaining three accidents during the event.

== Death ==
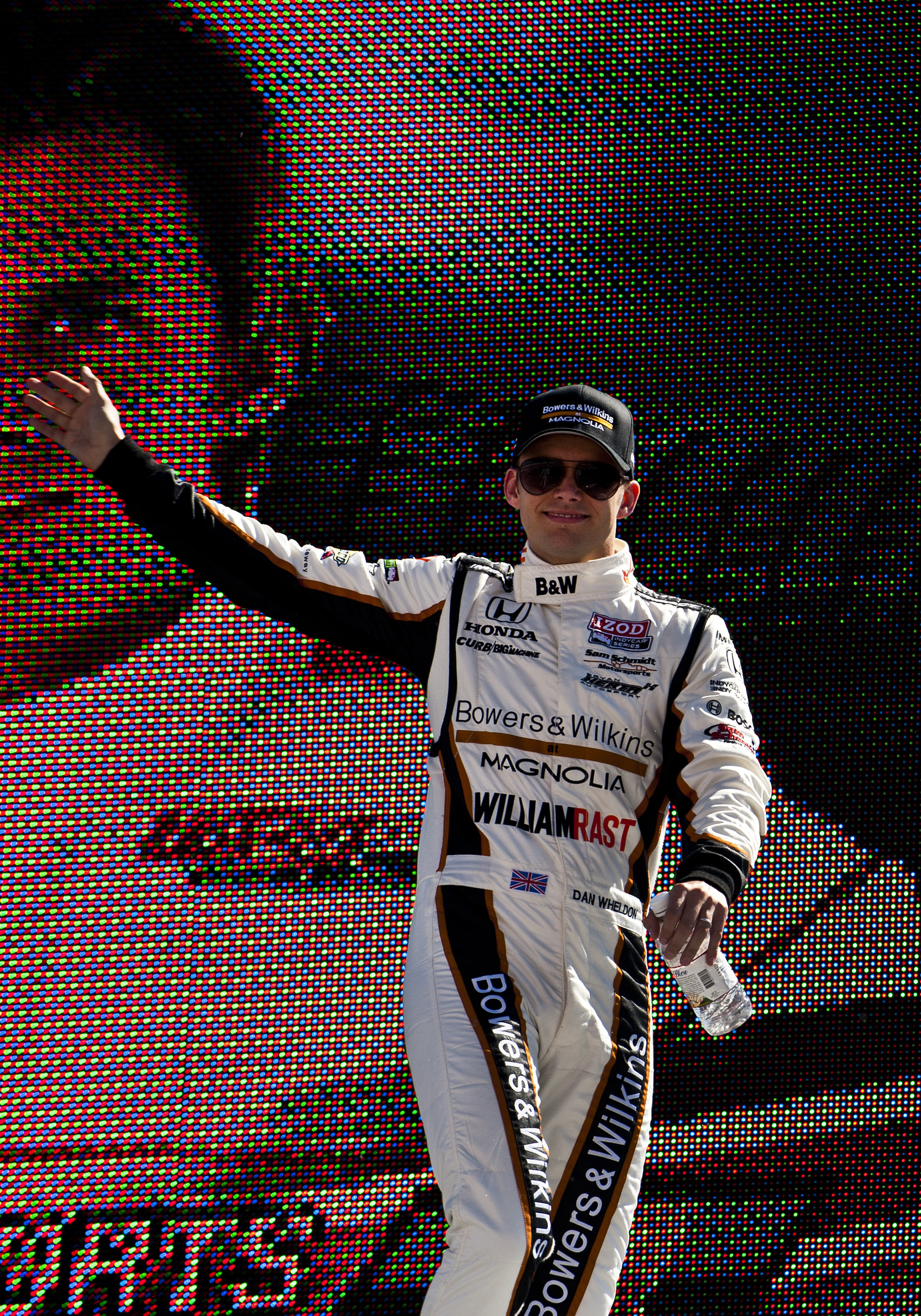
Wheldon waving during driver introductions shortly before his fatal accident

IndyCar Series CEO Randy Bernard set up a challenge for the season-ending 2011 IZOD IndyCar World Championship at Las Vegas Motor Speedway on 16 October. A prize of $5 million would be divided equally between a driver and a randomly selected fan if the driver won from the back of the grid. He was unable to get an international racing driver so he offered the challenge to Wheldon who accepted. He was frustrated about his car being more than 3 mph (4.8 km/h) slower than others and felt it would be difficult to remain with the pack if the issue was not resolved. Wheldon was also ABC's in-race reporter and spoke in defense of his participation in the event and IndyCar to the network's commentary team during the warm-up laps. On lap 11 out of the planned 200, a fifteen-car accident occurred between turns one and two in which Wheldon was involved. The accident began when James Hinchcliffe was clipped by Wade Cunningham. Cunningham and J. R. Hildebrand then collided when Cunningham swerved and Hildebrand drove over the rear of his car. Hildebrand's car became airborne and Cunningham collected Jay Howard on the inside and then Townsend Bell on the outside before crashing into the wall. Attempting to avoid the crash ahead, Vítor Meira lost control, spinning inward collecting both Charlie Kimball and E. J. Viso. At the same time Meira lost control, Tomas Scheckter was also attempting to avoid the first crash by rapidly slowing down on the outside. This led to Paul Tracy crashing into the back of Scheckter and a rapidly approaching Pippa Mann to launch over the top of Tracy after jerking to the outside to avoid crashing into Alex Lloyd. Wheldon was in 24th and traveling on the left-hand side of the track at 224 mph (360 km/h) in an attempt to avoid the pile-up and flying debris. Meira, Kimball and Viso blocked Wheldon's path, and he decelerated to 10% of throttle usage before he hit the left rear wheel of Kimball's car at 165 mph (266 km/h). He was launched semi-airborne for approximately 325 ft (99 m) and rotated towards the right-hand side catchfence.

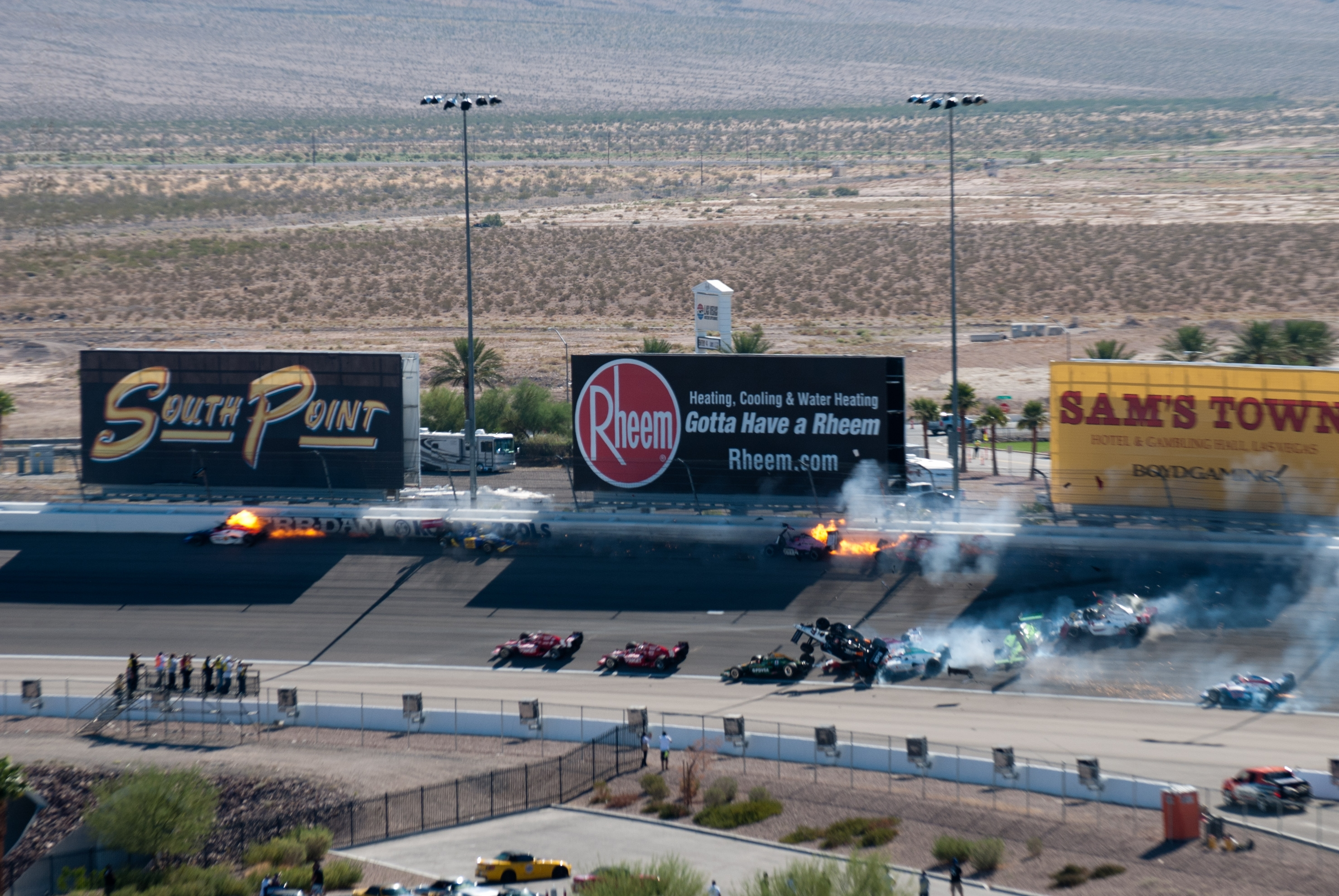
The crash scene just shortly after it began. Wheldon's car, seen at the bottom of the picture, has just left the racing surface.

Wheldon's vehicle rotated and traveled parallel to the catchfence above the concrete wall behind the SAFER barrier alongside the track. He collided with a fencepost along his car's right-hand side, creating a deep defect in the chassis that went from the upper pedal bulkhead and through the cockpit. That deformed its roll hoop and the top of the chassis above the fuel cell compartment, which were sheared from the car. The post penetrated the cockpit and struck the lower portion of the right-hand side of Wheldon's helmet in an impact measured at −30 g lateral, 47 g longitudinal, and −25 g vertical to the chassis as he sustained "two distinct impacts" to his head. The race was stopped after one caution lap. He was extricated from his car by the trackside safety team and airlifted to University Medical Center of Southern Nevada for his critical injuries. Wheldon was pronounced dead on arrival. After input from drivers and team owners, officials declared they would abandon the race. A five-lap, three-wide formation salute was held in Wheldon's honor, along with "Danny Boy" and "Amazing Grace" played on the bagpipes in the background. His No. 77 was displayed alone atop of the scoring pylon.

An autopsy conducted by Clark County Coroner Michael Murphy on 17 October determined that Wheldon died of blunt trauma to his head. He was the first driver to be killed in IndyCar competition since Paul Dana died in an accident during practice for the 2006 Toyota Indy 300 at Homestead–Miami Speedway. On 22 October, Wheldon was given a funeral at First Presbyterian Church of St. Petersburg attended by almost 1,000 mourners. Fellow drivers Franchitti, Dixon, Kanaan and Wheldon's three brothers acted as pallbearers. The next day, IndyCar held a public memorial service for him at Conseco Fieldhouse (now Gainbridge Fieldhouse) in Indianapolis, attended by members of the motor racing community and his family and fans. A second memorial service took place at All Saints' Church in his home town of Emberton on 6 November. He is buried at Calvary Catholic Cemetery in Clearwater, Florida.

Three days after the accident, series organizers, with assistance from the Automobile Competition Committee for the United States, the United States's national governing body of motor racing, and motorsport's world governing body, the Fédération Internationale de l'Automobile, began subjecting the race to a full investigation. The results of the investigation into Wheldon's death were released on 15 December 2011. According to the report, there was no single cause for the crash. Contributing factors included the catchfence around the track, and the unlimited track movement while racing that increased contact between cars, making it difficult to predict what would occur around the drivers, and increased the likelihood of a major accident. "Whilst several factors coincided to produce a perfect storm, none of them can be singled out as the sole cause of the accident. For this reason it is impossible to determine with certainty that the result would have been any different if one or more of the factors did not exist."

== Personality and legacy ==
Marcus Simmons, a writer for the British motor racing magazine Autosport, called Wheldon "one of a golden crop of richly-talented British drivers to graduate from karting to junior single-seaters in the mid to late-1990s", and, "a man who embodied the ideal of the immigrant to the 'New World' fulfilling the American Dream." Although he had a brash and confident persona that made him "cocky yet likeable", journalist Maurice Hamilton noted that Wheldon was seen by many as "a devoted family man, deeply respected and universally liked despite, or perhaps because of, a cheeky sense of self-awareness and a clever cultivation of his image". He had charisma, a sense of humour and warmth that made him a favourite amongst motor racing fans and the media, despite being unrecognisable in England due to Formula One being the country's most popular motor racing series. Wheldon was a keen learner, and was focused on accomplishing his objectives.

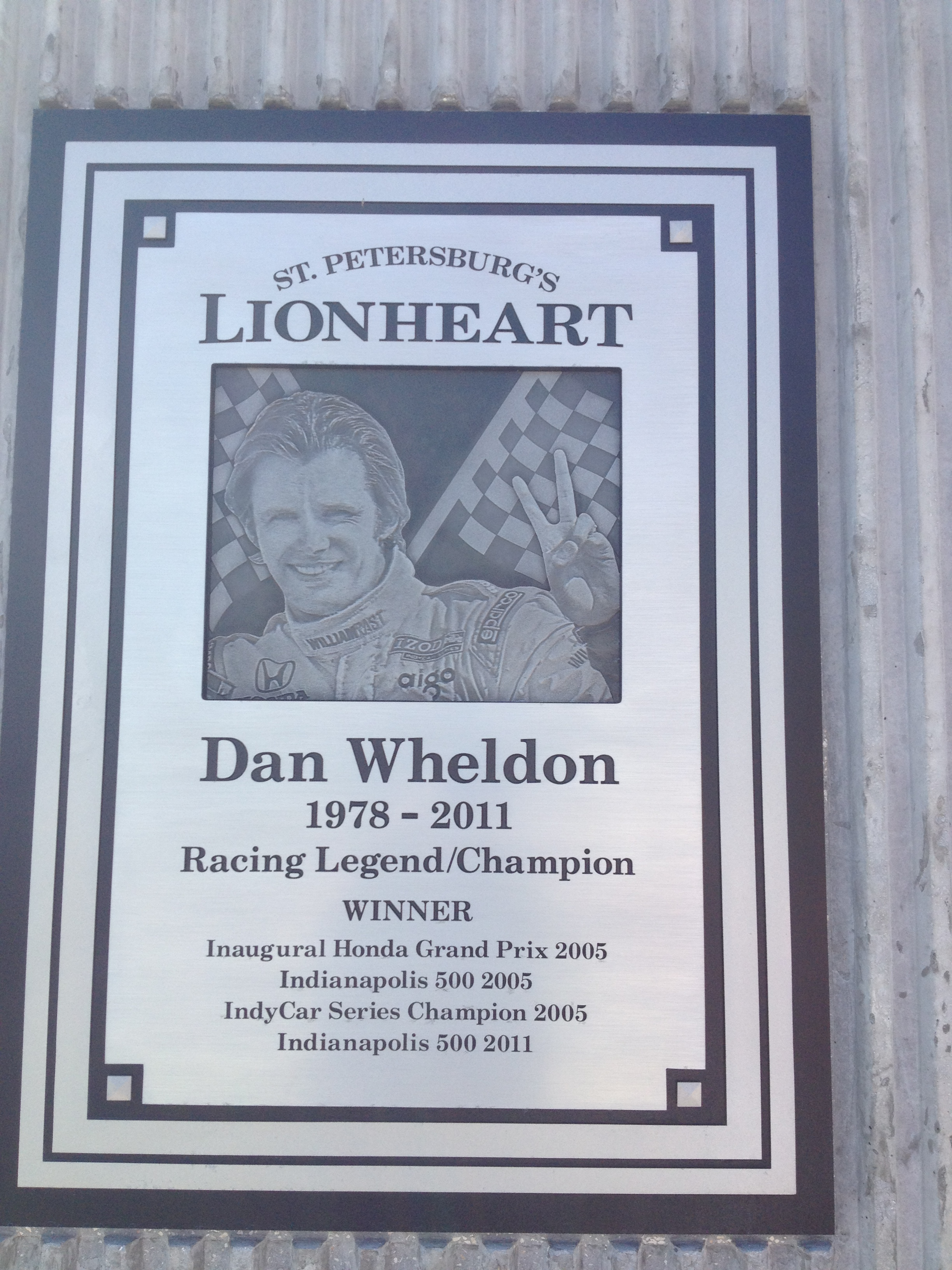
A memorial plaque dedicated to Wheldon's memory in 2013

Two days after his death, Dallara named their new one-specification chassis in Wheldon's honour. The DW12, with the new bumper/nerf bar section being featured, was designed to prevent many similar single-seater crashes such as the one that killed him. A charity race in Wheldon's honour was held in Milton Keynes on 6 December with drivers such as Franchitti, Jenson Button and Anthony Davidson competing. Proceeds from the event were donated to a charity selected by Wheldon's family. That month, Wheldon was posthumously awarded the Gregor Grant Award for his lifetime career achievements that his father Clive and Franchitti collected. Former racing driver Mark Dismore's New Castle Motorsports Park, which organises the Robo-Pong 200 endurance karting event that Wheldon won in 2005, named the trophy the Dan Wheldon Cup in 2012. The Wheldon family added a Wheldon Memorial Pro-Am to the event in 2013. On 7 March 2012, Wheldon's widow Susie and mayor Bill Foster unveiled a street sign in St. Petersburg, Florida. Named "Dan Wheldon Way", the sign was placed at the corner of Bayshore Drive and Albert Whitted Park (turn ten). A permanent memorial is also located across from the Salvador Dalí Museum.

Franchitti won the 2012 Indianapolis 500 on 27 May and dedicated his victory to Wheldon and wore white sunglasses in his honour. That year Wheldon was memorialised by a resolution passed by the Indiana Senate. A memorial plaque featuring his likeness and career achievements was unveiled in St. Petersburg outside the second turn of its street track in March 2013 and a wall in which each of the winners of the race was etched. Four months later, Autosport magazine named Wheldon one of the 50 greatest drivers to have never raced in Formula One. The Wheldons were honoured with the "Dan and Susie Wheldon Make a Difference Award" in September 2014. This included a $1,000 donation to charity and became part of the annual IndyCar Series prize-giving banquet. During the 2016 Kobalt 400 at Las Vegas Motor Speedway, pit lane reporter Jamie Little and motorsport publicist Brent Brush placed a Dan Wheldon Memorial plaque outside turn two, near the point where he was killed. In May 2016, a book on his life and career with contributions from the motor racing community entitled Lionheart: Remembering Dan Wheldon was published. Wheldon was inducted into the Indianapolis Motor Speedway Hall of Fame in May 2019. His death and legacy are the subject of the 2023 sports documentary The Lionheart.

=== Dan Wheldon International Driver Trophy ===
The Dan Wheldon International Driver Trophy was awarded to the best performing international driver over the race weekend of the Australian V8 Supercars Gold Coast 600. The trophy was named after Wheldon following his death, which took place a week prior to the 2011 event in which he was scheduled to participate with the Holden Racing Team. (Note: FIA GT1 World Championship driver Darren Turner took over Wheldon's place for the 2011 Armor All Gold Coast 600.) The international drivers' trophy had been unnamed when it debuted in 2010. The trophy was discontinued after 2012 when regulation changes removed the need for compulsory international co-drivers in the race.

| Season | Driver | Team | Ref(s) |
|---|---|---|---|
| 2010 | Andy Priaulx | Triple Eight Race Engineering | |
| 2011–2012 | Sébastien Bourdais | Triple Eight Race Engineering | |

== Motorsport career results ==
=== Racing career summary ===
| Season | Series | Team | Races | Wins | Podium | Poles | Point | Position |
|---|---|---|---|---|---|---|---|---|
| 1996 | Formula Vauxhall Junior Championship | Team JLR | 15 | 3 | 7 | - | 117 | **2nd** |
| 1997 | British Formula Ford Championship | Andy Welch Racing | 14 | 3 | - | - | 75 | 4th |
| 1997 | Formula Ford EuroCup | Andy Welch Racing | 4 | 0 | - | - | - | 4th |
| 1998 | British Formula Ford Championship | Duckhams | 14 | 4 | 7 | - | 104 | **3rd** |
| 1998 | Formula Ford EuroCup | Van Diemen | 4 | 0 | 2 | 0 | 38 | **3rd** |
| 1999 | U. S. F2000 National Championship | Jayhard/Primus Racing | 14 | 6 | 11 | 5 | 315 | **1st** |
| 2000 | Toyota Atlantic Championship | PPI Motorsports | 12 | 2 | 7 | 4 | 159 | **2nd** |
| 2001 | CART PPG/Dayton Indy Lights Championship | PacWest Lights | 12 | 2 | 7 | 0 | 149 | **2nd** |
| 2002 | Indy Racing League | Panther Racing | 2 | 0 | 0 | 0 | 35 | 36th |
| 2003 | IRL IndyCar Series | Andretti Green Racing | 14 | 0 | 1 | 0 | 312 | 11th |
| 2004 | IRL IndyCar Series | Andretti Green Racing | 16 | 3 | 11 | 2 | 533 | **2nd** |
| 2005 | IRL IndyCar Series | Andretti Green Racing | 17 | 6 | 9 | 0 | 628 | **1st** |
| 2005 | Rolex Sports Car Series | Howard-Boss Motorsports | 1 | 0 | 0 | 0 | 15 | 79th |
| 2006 | IRL IndyCar Series | Chip Ganassi Racing | 14 | 2 | 7 | 2 | 475 | **2nd** |
| 2006 | Rolex Sports Car Series | Chip Ganassi Racing | 1 | 0 | 0 | 0 | 35 | 77th |
| 2007 | IRL IndyCar Series | Chip Ganassi Racing | 17 | 2 | 6 | 1 | 466 | 4th |
| 2007 | Rolex Sports Car Series | Chip Ganassi Racing | 1 | 0 | 0 | 0 | 10 | 75th |
| 2008 | IndyCar Series | Chip Ganassi Racing | 18 | 2 | 4 | 0 | 492 | 4th |
| 2008 | IndyCar Series | Panther Racing | 1 | 0 | 0 | 0 | 492 | 4th |
| 2008 | Rolex Sports Car Series | Chip Ganassi Racing | 1 | 0 | 0 | 0 | 13 | 60th |
| 2009 | IndyCar Series | Panther Racing | 17 | 0 | 1 | 0 | 354 | 10th |
| 2010 | IZOD IndyCar Series | Panther Racing | 17 | 0 | 3 | 0 | 388 | 9th |
| 2011 | IZOD IndyCar Series | Bryan Herta Autosport | 1 | 1 | 0 | 0 | 75 | 28th |
| 2011 | IZOD IndyCar Series | Sam Schmidt Motorsports | 2 | 0 | 0 | 0 | 75 | 28th |

=== American open-wheel racing results ===
(key) (Races in bold indicate pole position and italics indicate fastest lap; small number denotes the finishing position)

==== Toyota Atlantic Championship ====
| Year | Team | 1 | 2 | 3 | 4 | 5 | 6 | 7 | 8 | 9 | 10 | 11 | 12 | Rank | Points | Ref |
|---|---|---|---|---|---|---|---|---|---|---|---|---|---|---|---|---|
| 2000 | PPI Motorsports | HMS1; 1 | **HMS2**; 2 | **LBH**; 4 | **MIL**; 13 | MTL; 3 | CLE; 6 | TOR; 3 | TRR; 2 | ROA; 2 | **LS**; 1 | GAT; 7 | HOU; 4 | **2nd** | **159** | |

==== Indy Lights ====
| Year | Team | 1 | 2 | 3 | 4 | 5 | 6 | 7 | 8 | 9 | 10 | 11 | 12 | Rank | Points | Ref |
|---|---|---|---|---|---|---|---|---|---|---|---|---|---|---|---|---|
| 2001 | PacWest Lights | MTY; 5 | LBH; 2 | TXS; 10 | MIL; 3 | POR; 10 | KAN; 3 | TOR; 7 | MOH; 2 | GAT; 1 | ATL; 1 | LS; 5 | FON; 2 | **2nd** | **149** | |

==== IndyCar Series ====
| Year | Team | No. | Chassis | Engine | 1 | 2 | 3 | 4 | 5 | 6 | 7 | 8 | 9 | 10 | 11 | 12 | 13 | 14 | 15 | 16 | 17 | 18 | 19 | Rank | Points | Ref |
|---|---|---|---|---|---|---|---|---|---|---|---|---|---|---|---|---|---|---|---|---|---|---|---|---|---|---|
| 2002 | Panther Racing | 15 | Dallara | Chevrolet | HMS | PHX | FON | NZR | INDY | TXS | PPIR | RIR | KAN | NSH | MIS | KTY | STL | CHI; 10 | TX2; 15 | | | | | 36th | 35 | |
| 2003 | Andretti Green Racing | 26 | Dallara | Honda | HMS | PHX | MOT; 7 | INDY; 19 | TXS; 20 | PPIR; 19 | RIR; 8 | KAN; 21 | NSH; 4 | MIS; 20 | STL; 5 | KTY; 8 | NZR; 7 | CHI; 4 | FON; 4 | TX2; 3 | | | | 11th | 312 | |
| 2004 | Andretti Green Racing | 26 | Dallara | Honda | HMS; 3 | **PHX**; 3 | **MOT**; 1 | INDY; 3 | TXS; 13 | RIR; 1 | KAN; 9 | NSH; 13 | MIL; 18 | MIS; 3 | KTY; 3 | PPIR; 3 | NZR; 1 | CHI; 4 | FON; 3 | TX2; 3 | | | | 2nd | 533 | |
| 2005 | Andretti Green Racing | 26 | Dallara | Honda | HMS; 1 | PHX; 6 | STP; 1 | MOT; 1 | INDY; 1 | TXS; 6 | RIR; 5 | KAN; 2 | NSH; 21 | MIL; 5 | MIS; 2 | KTY; 3 | PPIR; 1 | SNM; 18 | CHI; 1 | WGL; 5 | FON; 6 | | | 1st | 628 | |
| 2006 | Chip Ganassi Racing | 10 | Dallara | Honda | HMS; 1 | STP; 16 | MOT; 2 | INDY; 4 | WGL; 15 | TXS; 3 | RIR; 9 | **KAN**; 2 | **NSH**; 2 | MIL; 8 | MIS; 3 | KTY; 4 | SNM; 6 | CHI; 1 | | | | | | 2nd^{a} | 475 | |
| 2007 | Chip Ganassi Racing | 10 | Dallara | Honda | **HMS**; 1 | STP; 9 | MOT; 2 | KAN; 1 | INDY; 22 | MIL; 3 | TXS; 15 | IOW; 11 | RIR; 3 | WGL; 7 | NSH; 8 | MOH; 10 | MIS; 12 | KTY; 17 | SNM; 7 | DET; 3 | CHI; 13 | | | 4th | 466 | |
| 2008 | Chip Ganassi Racing | 10 | Dallara | Honda | HMS; 3 | STP; 12 | MOT^{1} 4 | LBH^{1} DNP | KAN; 1 | INDY; 12 | MIL; 4 | TXS; 4 | IOW; 1 | RIR; 4 | WGL; 24 | NSH; 2 | MOH; 17 | EDM; 7 | KTY; 5 | SNM; 4 | DET; 20 | CHI; 6 | | 4th | 492 | |
| 2008 | Panther Racing | 4 | Dallara | Honda | | | | | | | | | | | | | | | | | | | SRF^{2} 11 | 4th | 492 | |
| 2009 | Panther Racing | 4 | Dallara | Honda | STP; 14 | LBH; 5 | KAN; 10 | INDY; 2 | MIL; 10 | TXS; 7 | IOW; 4 | RIR; 10 | WGL; 10 | TOR; 14 | EDM; 15 | KTY; 11 | MOH; 16 | SNM; 12 | CHI; 22 | MOT; 8 | HMS; 21 | | | 10th | 354 | |
| 2010 | Panther Racing | 4 | Dallara | Honda | SAO; 5 | STP; 20 | ALA; 11 | LBH; 9 | KAN; 15 | INDY; 2 | TXS; 9 | IOW; 11 | WGL; 6 | TOR; 10 | EDM; 20 | MOH; 14 | SNM; 25 | CHI; 2 | KTY; 3 | MOT; 10 | HMS; 9 | | | 9th | 388 | |
| 2011 | BHA with Curb Agajanian Sam Schmidt Motorsports | 98 | Dallara | Honda | STP | ALA | LBH | SAO | INDY; 1 | TXS1 | TXS2 | MIL | IOW | TOR | EDM | MOH | NHM | SNM | BAL | MOT | | | | 28th | 75 | |
| 2011 | Sam Schmidt Motorsports | 77 | Dallara | Honda | | | | | | | | | | | | | | | | | KTY; 14 | LVS^{3} C | | 28th | 75 | |

^{a} Wheldon lost the title on the tiebreaker—he won only 2 races compared to Sam Hornish Jr.'s 4 after both tied on 475 points
^{1} Run on same day
^{2} Non-points race
^{3} Race abandoned after 15-car crash on lap 11 involving Wheldon, who would later succumb to injuries sustained in the accident.

| Years | Teams | Races | Poles | Wins | Podiums (non-win)** | Top 10s (non-podium)*** | Indianapolis 500 wins | Championships | Ref |
|---|---|---|---|---|---|---|---|---|---|
| 10 | 5 | 133 | 5 | 16 | 27 | 50 | 2 (2005, 2011) | 1 (2005) | |

** Podium (non-win) indicates second or third place finishes.
*** Top 10s (non-podium) indicates fourth through tenth place finishes.

===== Indianapolis 500 results =====
| Year | Chassis | Engine | Start | Finish | Team | Status |
|---|---|---|---|---|---|---|
| 2003 | Dallara | Honda | 5 | 19 | Andretti Green Racing | Wrecked in turn 4, flipped |
| 2004 | Dallara | Honda | 2 | 3 | Andretti Green Racing | Running |
| 2005 | Dallara | Honda | 16 | **1** | Andretti Green Racing | Running; 157.603 mph |
| 2006 | Dallara | Honda | 3 | 4 | Chip Ganassi Racing | Running |
| 2007 | Dallara | Honda | 6 | 22 | Chip Ganassi Racing | Crashed on backstretch |
| 2008 | Dallara | Honda | 2 | 12 | Chip Ganassi Racing | Running |
| 2009 | Dallara | Honda | 18 | 2 | Panther Racing | Running |
| 2010 | Dallara | Honda | 18 | 2 | Panther Racing | Running |
| 2011 | Dallara | Honda | 6 | **1** | Bryan Herta Autosport | Running; 170.265 mph |

=== Sports car racing ===
(DNF signifies Did Not Finish)

==== 24 Hours of Daytona results ====
24 Hours of Daytona results
| Year | Class | No. | Team | Car | Engine | Co-drivers | Laps | Position | Class Pos. |
|---|---|---|---|---|---|---|---|---|---|
| 2005 | DP | 2 | Howard-Boss Motorsports | Crawford | Pontiac | Dario Franchitti; Milka Duno; Marino Franchitti | 528 | 33 ^{DNF} | 16 ^{DNF} |
| 2006 | DP | 02 | Target Chip Ganassi Racing | Riley MkXI | Lexus | Scott Dixon; Casey Mears | 734 | **1** | **1** |
| 2007 | DP | 02 | Target Chip Ganassi Racing | Riley MkXI | Lexus 5.0L V8 | Scott Dixon; Memo Rojas | 538 | 41 ^{DNF} | 21 ^{DNF} |
| 2008 | DP | 02 | Target Chip Ganassi Racing | Riley MkXI | Lexus 5.0L V8 | Scott Dixon; Alex Lloyd; Salvador Durán | 515 | 44 ^{DNF} | 18 ^{DNF} |

==== Grand-Am Rolex Sports Car Series ====
(key) (Races in bold indicate pole position, Results are overall/class)

| Year | Team | Make | Engine | Class | 1 | 2 | 3 | 4 | 5 | 6 | 7 | 8 | 9 | 10 | 11 | 12 | 13 | 14 | 15 | Rank | Points | Ref |
|---|---|---|---|---|---|---|---|---|---|---|---|---|---|---|---|---|---|---|---|---|---|---|
| 2005 | Howard-Boss Motorsports | Crawford | Pontiac | DP | DAY; **33/16** | HOM | CAL | LAG | CMT | WAT1 | BAR | WAT2 | DAY2 | MOH | PHX | WAT3 | VIR | MEX | | **79th** | **15** | |
| 2006 | Target Chip Ganassi Racing | Riley MkXI | Lexus | DP | DAY; **1/1** | MEX | HOM | LBH | VIR | LAG | PHX | LRP | WAT1 | DAY2 | BAR | WAT2 | INF | MIL | | **77th** | **35** | |
| 2007 | Target Chip Ganassi Racing | Riley MkXI | Lexus 5.0L V8 | DP | DAY; **41/21** | MEX | HOM | VIR | LAG | LRP | WAT1 | MOH | DAY2 | IOW | CGV | BAR | WAT2 | INF | MIL | **75th** | **10** | |
| 2008 | Target Chip Ganassi Racing | Riley MkXI | Lexus 5.0L V8 | DP | DAY; **44/18** | HOM | MEX | VIR | LAG | LRP | WAT | MOH | DAY2 | BAR | CGV | WAT2 | INF | NJ | MIL | **60th** | **13** | |

== See also ==
- Driver deaths in motorsport
- Indianapolis 500 firsts
- Indianapolis 500 records
- List of Indianapolis 500 lap leaders

== Notes and references ==
=== References ===
Sporting positions
| Preceded by Laurent Redon | IndyCar Series; Rookie of the Year; 2003 | Succeeded by Kosuke Matsuura |
| Preceded by Buddy Rice; Dario Franchitti | Indianapolis 500 Winner; 2005; 2011 | Succeeded by Sam Hornish Jr. Dario Franchitti |
| Preceded by Tony Kanaan | IndyCar Series Champion; 2005 | Succeeded by Sam Hornish Jr. |
Awards
| Preceded by Mark Webber | Autosport; Rookie of the Year; 2003 | Succeeded by A. J. Allmendinger |
| Preceded by Andy Priaulx | Autosport; British Competition Driver of the Year; 2005 | Succeeded by Jenson Button |
| Preceded by Rubens Barrichello; Jackie Stewart | Autosport; Gregor Grant Award; 2011; With: Damon Hill | Succeeded by Sébastien Loeb; Jimmy McRae |
| Preceded by Danica Patrick | IndyCar Series; Most Popular Driver; 2011 | Succeeded by James Hinchcliffe |

| Preceded by Paul Dana | Fatalities in Champ Car/IndyCar; 2011 | Succeeded by Justin Wilson |
