= 2009 Indianapolis 500 =

American motor race

93rd Indianapolis 500

Indianapolis Motor Speedway

Indianapolis 500
- Sanctioning body: Indy Racing League
- Season: 2009 IndyCar season
- Date: May 24, 2009
- Winner: (Brazil) Hélio Castroneves
- Winning team: Penske Racing
- Winning Chief Mechanic: Rick Rinaman
- Time of race: 3:19:34.6427
- Average speed: 150.318 mph
- Pole position: (Brazil) Hélio Castroneves
- Pole speed: 224.864 mph (362 km/h)
- Fastest qualifier: (Brazil) Hélio Castroneves
- Rookie of the Year: (Canada) Alex Tagliani
- Most laps led: (New Zealand) Scott Dixon (73)

Pre-race ceremonies
- National anthem: Indiana National Guard
- "Back Home Again in Indiana": Jim Nabors
- Starting command: Mari Hulman George
- Pace car: Chevrolet Camaro
- Pace car driver: Josh Duhamel
- Starter: Bryan Howard
- Honorary starter: Allen Sirkin, COO of Phillips-Van Heusen
- Estimated attendance: 250,000+

Television in the United States
- Network: ABC
- Announcers: Marty Reid; Scott Goodyear; Eddie Cheever, Jr.
- Nielsen ratings: 4.0 / 11

Chronology
Previous	Next
2008	2010

The 93rd Indianapolis 500 was held at the Indianapolis Motor Speedway in Speedway, Indiana on Sunday May 24, 2009. It was the 14th Indy 500 sanctioned by the Indy Racing League, and the premier event of the 2009 IndyCar Series season.

Hélio Castroneves, a native of Brazil, won the race from the pole position, his third of four Indy 500 victories. He became the first foreign-born three-time winner of the race, and tied a record by winning the race three times in the same decade (2001, 2002, 2009). The win was car owner Roger Penske's 15th Indy 500 triumph, extending his team's own record. Former winner Dan Wheldon of England came second, with Danica Patrick third, the best finish ever by a female driver. There were eight crashes, with Vítor Meira and Tony Kanaan both suffering non-permanent injuries.

The race began the three-year-long Centennial era, celebrating the 100th anniversary of the opening of the track (1909) and the 100th anniversary of the inaugural race in 1911.

The victory by Castroneves marked the milestone 60th Indianapolis 500 victory for Firestone. It came less than two months after Castroneves was acquitted of federal charges of tax evasion and conspiracy. The IRS filed the charges against Castroneves in the fall of 2008, and the trial was held in March 2009 at the U.S. District Court in Miami. A guilty verdict in the trial would have likely sent Castroneves to prison, and ended his driving career.

== Schedule ==
Race schedule — May 2009
Sun	Mon	Tue	Wed	Thu	Fri	Sat
					1	2 Mini-Marathon
3	4	5 ROP	6 ROP	7 Practice	8 Practice	9 Pole Day
10; Time Trials	11	12	13	14; Practice	15; Practice	16; Time Trials
17; Bump Day	18	19	20; Comm. Day	21	22; Carb Day	23; Parade
24; Indy 500	25; Memorial Day	26	27	28	29	30
31						

Color	Notes
Green	Practice
Dark Blue	Time trials
Silver	Race day
Red	Rained out*
Blank	No track activity

* Includes days where track activity
was significantly limited due to rain

ROP — denotes Rookie Orientation Program

Comm. Day — denotes 500 Festival Community Day

=== Other selected events ===
- May 21: Firestone Indy Lights practice and qualifying
- May 22: Freedom 100

== Entry list ==
See Team and Driver Chart for more information

The official entry list was released April 20. The initial list includes 77 cars for 40 entries. 32 driver–car combinations have already been announced, as of Monday, May 4. Among the participants include five former winners (Lazier, Castroneves, Wheldon, Franchitti, Dixon), and six rookies.

Paul Tracy, the runner-up of the controversial 2002 race, returned for the first time since that race, and Scott Sharp also returns. However, this would mark the final IndyCar Series race for the 1996 Indy Racing League co-champion.

== Race and event news ==
Indianapolis Motor Speedway, the race track where the race was held.

- The pace car was the 2010 Chevrolet Camaro SS. It was the first Camaro pace car since 1993, and the first time the Corvette was not the pace car since 2003. Actor Josh Duhamel served as the driver.
- Miss America Katie Stam sang "America the Beautiful" during the pre-race ceremonies. Jim Nabors traditionally performed "Back Home Again in Indiana".
- The pre-race fly-by was conducted by two vintage B-25 Mitchell bombers to honor Disabled American Veterans In addition, a ten-member firing detail from the Indiana National Guard executed the three-volley salute.
- The Centennial Era Balloon Festival opened the month of activities on May 1–3.
- The 33rd annual OneAmerica 500 Festival Mini-Marathon was held May 2. Drivers Will Power and Mike Conway participated.
- 3 Doors Down headlined the annual Carb Day concert.
- NASCAR team Richard Petty Motorsports collaborated with Dreyer & Reinbold Racing in fielding an entry for veteran John Andretti.
- The drivers of the starting field participated in the annual New York City publicity tour at Herald Square on May 18.
- The 2009 race would prove to be the final time that Team Penske ran the Marlboro colors at the Speedway. During the offseason that followed the 2009 IndyCar season, Phillip Morris USA ended their relationship with Penske Racing, closing out a 21-year partnership.

== Practice – Week 1 ==
=== Tuesday May 5 – Rookie Orientation ===
- Weather: Partly cloudy, 71 °F (22 °C)
- Practice summary: Nine drivers took to the track for the first day of rookie orientation. Six rookies participated and three veterans took refresher tests. Robert Doornbos, Raphael Matos, Alex Tagliani, and Mike Conway completed all four phases of the rookie test. Nelson Philippe completed three phases, while Stanton Barrett finished two. No incidents were reported.

May 5, 2009 – Top Practice Speeds
Rank	Car No.	Driver	Team	Best Speed
1	15	(Canada) Paul Tracy	KV Racing	223.089 mph (359 km/h)
2	16	(United States) Scott Sharp	Panther Racing	221.878 mph (357 km/h)
3	06	(Netherlands) Robert Doornbos	Newman/Haas/Lanigan Racing	221.735 mph (357 km/h)
4	2	(Brazil) Raphael Matos	Luczo Dragon Racing	218.613 mph (352 km/h)
5	34	(Canada) Alex Tagliani	Conquest Racing	218.333 mph (351 km/h)
OFFICIAL REPORT

=== Wednesday May 6 – Rookie Orientation & IndyCar Series practice ===
- Weather: Rain, 62 °F (17 °C)
- Practice summary: The second session of rookie orientation began at 9 a.m. Three cars took to the track for 45 minutes before rain interrupted the session. Nelson Philippe completed the final phase of his rookie test. All veteran practice was washed out for the day.

May 6, 2009 – Top Practice Speeds
Rank	Car No.	Driver	Team	Best Speed
1	00	(France) Nelson Philippe	HVM Racing	217.688 mph (350 km/h)
2	99	(United Kingdom) Alex Lloyd	Sam Schmidt Motorsports	214.514 mph (345 km/h)
3	98	(United States) Stanton Barrett	Team 3G	211.644 mph (341 km/h)
OFFICIAL REPORT

=== Thursday May 7 – IndyCar Series practice ===
- Weather: 73 °F (23 °C), foggy in the morning
- Practice summary: Practice opened early to make up for lost time on Wednesday. Veterans took to the track for the first time just before 11 a.m. At 2:19 p.m., Ryan Hunter-Reay spun exiting turn two and hit the outside wall down the backstretch. He was not injured. A busy day of practice saw 2,199 practice laps completed.

May 7, 2009 – Top Practice Speeds
Rank	Car No.	Driver	Team	Best Speed
1	26	(United States) Marco Andretti	Andretti Green Racing	225.478 mph (363 km/h)
2	3	(Brazil) Hélio Castroneves	Team Penske	225.237 mph (362 km/h)
3	6	(Australia) Ryan Briscoe	Team Penske	224.904 mph (362 km/h)
4	9	(New Zealand) Scott Dixon	Chip Ganassi Racing	224.448 mph (361 km/h)
5	10	(United Kingdom) Dario Franchitti	Chip Ganassi Racing	224.160 mph (361 km/h)
OFFICIAL REPORT

=== Friday May 8 – IndyCar Series Fast Friday practice ===
- Weather: 67 °F (19 °C), cloudy, light rain in the afternoon
- Practice summary: The final full day of practice was held before pole qualifying. Two significant crashes occurred. At 12:30 p.m., rookie Robert Doornbos went high and crashed into the wall in turn two. The car continued to slide down the backstretch. About two hours later, Scott Sharp lost the back end in the southchute, and crashed hard in turn two. Both drivers climbed from their cars. Largely aided by a tow, both Penske cars broke the 225 mph barrier. Midway through the afternoon, a light shower delayed practice for one hour.

May 8, 2009 – Top Practice Speeds
Rank	Car No.	Driver	Team	Best Speed
1	6	(Australia) Ryan Briscoe	Team Penske	225.981 mph (364 km/h)
2	3	(Brazil) Hélio Castroneves	Team Penske	225.438 mph (363 km/h)
3	10	(United Kingdom) Dario Franchitti	Chip Ganassi Racing	224.984 mph (362 km/h)
4	9	(New Zealand) Scott Dixon	Chip Ganassi Racing	224.822 mph (362 km/h)
5	7	(United States) Danica Patrick	Andretti Green Racing	224.755 mph (362 km/h)
OFFICIAL REPORT

== Time trials – Weekend 1 ==
=== Saturday May 9 – Pole day ===
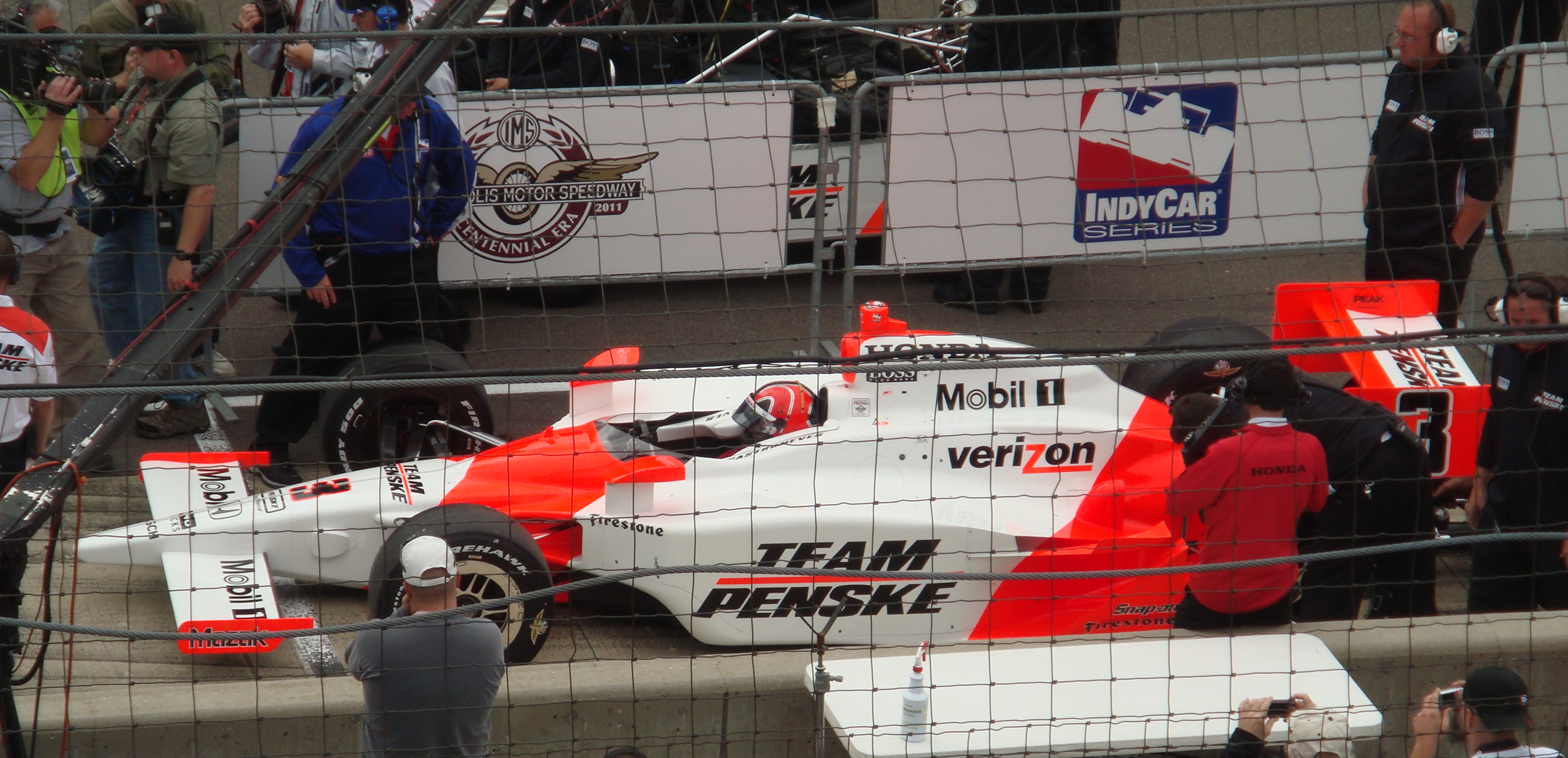
Hélio Castroneves sits in his car just prior to his pole-winning qualification run.

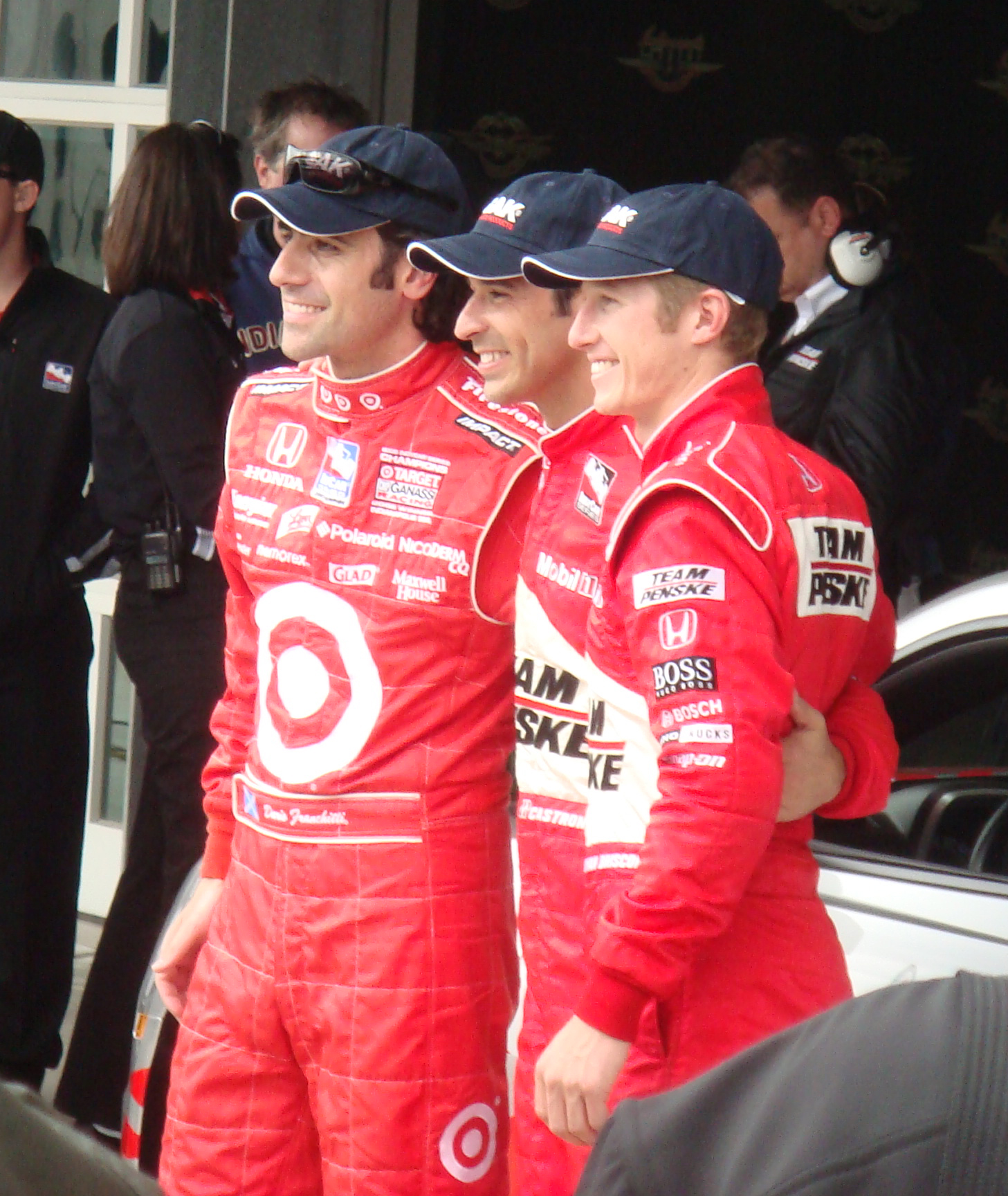
Front row qualifiers (L to R): Dario Franchitti, Hélio Castroneves, and Ryan Briscoe.

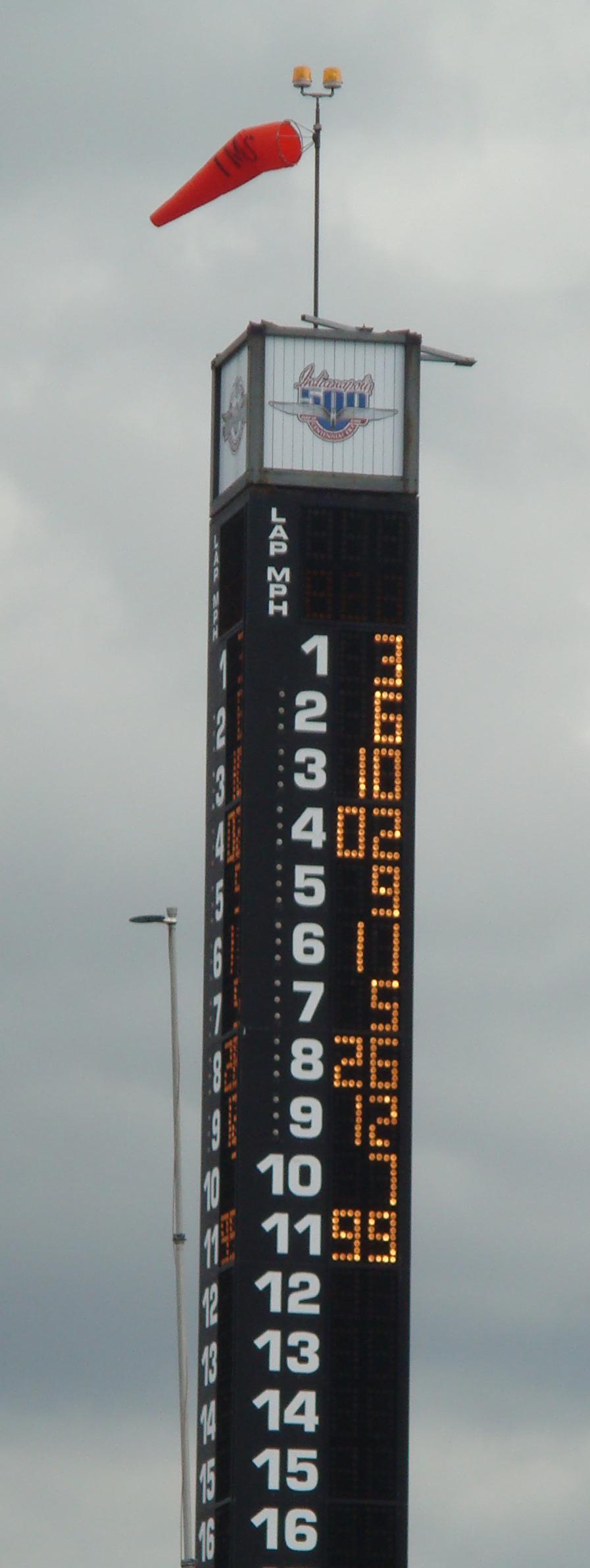
Scoring pylon at the close of pole day qualifications.

- Weather: 65 °F (18 °C), sunny and windy
- Television: Versus (Bob Jenkins, Robbie Buhl, Jon Beekhuis, Jack Arute, Robbie Floyd, Lindy Thackston)
- Rating: 0.35 (385,000 households)
- Practice summary

Windy conditions kept many speeds down during the morning practice session. Robert Doornbos crashed for the second day in a row in turn two, this time in his backup car. Penske teammates Ryan Briscoe (225.182 mph) and Hélio Castroneves (224.525 mph) again led the speed chart. Later in the afternoon, Dan Wheldon hit a gust of wind and backed the car into the wall in turn two. He would not go on to make a qualifying attempt.

- Time trials summary

The first wave of qualifiers began at 12 noon. Justin Wilson was the first car to complete an attempt. Marco Andretti was second out, and put himself on the provisional pole at 222.789 mph. It did not last long, as Penske driver Ryan Briscoe up the speed to 224.131 mph. Hélio Castroneves rounded out the first wave of time trials, filling the field to eleven cars, and tentatively putting himself second on the grid.

About an hour later, Dario Franchitti squeezed himself into the front row as second-fastest. Later, his Ganassi teammate Scott Dixon also completed a run, but did not threaten the top three. Meanwhile, Wilson's run was disallowed due to an improper ballast location, and Tony Kanaan was disqualified for being underweight.

At 3:45 p.m., Danica Patrick was the first to withdraw an earlier speed and go out for a second attempt. She improved her speed by nearly a mile per hour. Hélio Castroneves then withdrew and took to the track. His 224.864 mph run took over the pole position. Several drivers took their shot, but no one was able to bump Castroneves from the pole position. Sitting on the bubble, Paul Tracy endured seven instances where his car was re-instated to the field (due to cars withdrawing). However, he ultimately was bumped. With five minutes left in the day, Alex Lloyd made his first attempt. He surprisingly bumped his way into the field, and held on to make the top 11.

May 9, 2009 – Pole Day Qualifying Results
Rank	Car No.	Driver	Team	Qual. Speed
1	3	(Brazil) Hélio Castroneves	Penske Racing	224.864 mph (362 km/h)
2	6	(Australia) Ryan Briscoe	Penske Racing	224.083 mph (361 km/h)
3	10	(United Kingdom) Dario Franchitti	Chip Ganassi Racing	224.010 mph (361 km/h)
4	02	(United States) Graham Rahal	Newman/Haas/Lanigan Racing	223.954 mph (360 km/h)
5	9	(New Zealand) Scott Dixon	Chip Ganassi Racing	223.867 mph (360 km/h)
6	11	(Brazil) Tony Kanaan	Andretti Green Racing	223.612 mph (360 km/h)
7	5	(Brazil) Mario Moraes	KV Racing Technology	223.331 mph (359 km/h)
8	26	(United States) Marco Andretti	Andretti Green Racing	223.113 mph (359 km/h)
9	12	(Australia) Will Power	Penske Racing	223.028 mph (359 km/h)
10	7	(United States) Danica Patrick	Andretti Green Racing	222.882 mph (359 km/h)
11	99	(United Kingdom) Alex Lloyd	Sam Schmidt Motorsports	222.622 mph (358 km/h)
OFFICIAL REPORT

=== Sunday May 10 – Second day ===
- Weather: 67 °F (19 °C), partly cloudy
- Practice summary

On only his second lap of the day, rookie Mike Conway spun and crashed hard in turn one, badly damaging the car. Conway was transferred to Methodist Hospital with bruised lungs. Twenty minutes later, Alex Tagliani also wrecked in turn one, but was not injured.

During afternoon practice, John Andretti added to the D & R Team's woes, with a wreck in turn one. Sitting on the bubble, Andretti was practicing in expectations to re-qualify. The back end broke loose, and he slid into the wall. Graham Rahal was following close behind the crash. He went high to avoid debris, but Andretti's car slid right back into his path. Rahal took evasive action, and spun the car inside to avoid contact. He suffered four flat tires, but kept the car off the wall.

- Time trials summary

For the second day of time trials, positions 12–22 were open for qualifying. Sarah Fisher started out the day at noon. She slipped in turn one, and completed a disappointing run of 219.911 mph. After one hour, nine additional cars completed runs, including Vítor Meira, Paul Tracy, and Justin Wilson. Fisher withdrew her previous time, and on her second attempt, improved her speed to over 222 mph.

After some downtime, Dan Wheldon, who had wrecked in practice a day earlier, put his car solidly in the field at 222.777 mph. He was followed by surprising runs by Ed Carpenter, and Raphael Matos. At 223.492 mph, Matos was the seventh-fastest car overall in the field, the fastest car of the day, and the first rookie to qualify.

Late in the afternoon, several drivers began jockeying for the final few spots open for the day. Scott Sharp completed a slow run, but eventually withdrew the time. About an hour later, Sharp went back out to try again, this time bumping John Andretti. Andretti had just wrecked his car in practice, and was not going to return to the track for the day. Sharp's speed of 221.333 mph, however, put him on the bubble. He was scheduled to race in the ALMS Utah Grand Prix the following weekend, and hoped to qualify at Indy before departing for Utah.

With 25 minutes left in the day, A. J. Foyt IV bumped out Sharp, and put himself safely in the field. The move left E. J. Viso on the bubble at 221.745 mph. Ryan Hunter-Reay and Alex Tagliani both attempted to bump Viso, but both were too slow and waved off. With about one minute remaining until the 6 o'clock gun, Viso, Davey Hamilton and Sarah Fisher all pulled out of the qualifying line (Hamilton and Fisher were at that point, safely in the field). That allowed Scott Sharp to hurry onto the track just seconds before the gun. Sharp completed a run of 222.162 mph, and bumped out Viso.

May 10, 2009 – Second Day Qualifying Results
Rank	Car No.	Driver	Team	Qual. Speed
12	2	(Brazil) Raphael Matos R	Luczo Dragon Racing	223.429 mph (360 km/h)
13	15	(Canada) Paul Tracy	KV Racing	223.111 mph (359 km/h)
14	14	(Brazil) Vítor Meira	A. J. Foyt Enterprises	223.054 mph (359 km/h)
15	18	(United Kingdom) Justin Wilson	Dale Coyne Racing	222.903 mph (359 km/h)
16	27	(Japan) Hideki Mutoh	Andretti Green Racing	222.805 mph (359 km/h)
17	20	(United States) Ed Carpenter	Vision Racing	222.780 mph (359 km/h)
18	4	(United Kingdom) Dan Wheldon	Panther Racing	222.777 mph (359 km/h)
19	41	(United States) A. J. Foyt IV	A. J. Foyt Enterprises	222.586 mph (358 km/h)
20	16	(United States) Scott Sharp	Panther Racing	222.162 mph (358 km/h)
21	67	(United States) Sarah Fisher	Sarah Fisher Racing	222.082 mph (357 km/h)
22	44	(United States) Davey Hamilton	Dreyer & Reinbold Racing	221.956 mph (357 km/h)
OFFICIAL REPORT

== Practice – Week 2 ==
=== Thursday May 14 – IndyCar Series practice ===
- Weather: Cloudy, 69 °F (21 °C)
- Practice summary: Practice resumed after three off-days, and track activity was busy. Oriol Servià was named to the Rahal Letterman entry, and took his first laps of the month. At 221.353 mph, Servia was the fastest among non-qualified cars. Veteran Buddy Lazier took his first laps of the month as well. No incidents were reported.

May 14, 2009 – Top Practice Speeds
Rank	Car No.	Driver	Team	Best Speed
1	5	(Brazil) Mario Moraes	KV Racing Technology	222.739 mph (358 km/h)
2	6	(Australia) Ryan Briscoe	Team Penske	222.406 mph (358 km/h)
3	3	(Brazil) Hélio Castroneves	Team Penske	222.395 mph (358 km/h)
4	9	(New Zealand) Scott Dixon	Chip Ganassi Racing	222.374 mph (358 km/h)
5	11	(Brazil) Tony Kanaan	Andretti Green Racing	221.890 mph (357 km/h)
OFFICIAL REPORT

=== Friday May 15 – IndyCar Series practice ===
- Weather: Partly cloudy, 75 °F (24 °C)
- Practice summary: The final full day of practice saw heavy activity amongst qualified and non-qualified entries. Early in the afternoon, Tomas Scheckter took his first laps of the month. In addition, Mike Conway returned after his crash earlier in the week. The teams spent most of the day running in race trim. The cars took turns running in drafting packs. Of the non-qualified entries, Townsend Bell was fastest, with Oriol Servià next. No incidents on the track were reported. However, practice had to be halted at 5:33 p.m. when a number of the bricks from the famous start/finish line came loose in the mortar, and one chunk flew out.

May 15, 2009 – Top Practice Speeds
Rank	Car No.	Driver	Team	Best Speed
1	9	(New Zealand) Scott Dixon	Chip Ganassi Racing	222.799 mph (359 km/h)
2	5	(Brazil) Mario Moraes	KV Racing Technology	222.799 mph (359 km/h)
3	8	(United States) Townsend Bell	KV Racing Technology	222.139 mph (357 km/h)
4	3T	(Brazil) Hélio Castroneves	Team Penske	222.395 mph (358 km/h)
5	6T	(Australia) Ryan Briscoe	Team Penske	222.406 mph (358 km/h)
OFFICIAL REPORT

== Time trials – Weekend 2 ==
=== Saturday May 16 – Third day ===
- Weather: TBA
- Television: Versus (Bob Jenkins, Robbie Buhl, Jon Beekhuis, Jack Arute, Robbie Floyd, Lindy Thackston)
- Practice summary

Overnight rains delayed the start of practice until 11:15 a.m. Townsend Bell led the speed chart at 223.580 mph. After practice, rain fell again, closing the track for three hours.

- Time trials summary

Track crews dried the track, and Third Day Time Trials began at 3:30 p.m. Ten qualifying attempts were made, and eight were run to completion. Robert Doornbos recovered from his crashes the previous week, and put in the fastest qualifying speed of the day (221.692 mph). Also qualifying early on with solid runs were Townsend Bell, Tomas Scheckter, and Oriol Servià. After a fast first lap, Buddy Lazier's first four-lap qualifying attempt sunk to a slow 216.487 mph.

After an hour of down time, John Andretti was the next car to attempt. His speed of 219.442 was slower than his speed last weekend, but it tentatively put him in the field. Meanwhile, Alex Tagliani and Mike Conway safely qualified. The day wrapped up with a full field of 33 cars. Milka Duno bumped out Buddy Lazier, then Stanton Barrett fell 0.0262 seconds shy of bumping his way into the field.

May 16, 2009 – Third Day Qualifying Results
Rank	Car No.	Driver	Team	Qual. Speed
23	06	(Netherlands) Robert Doornbos R	Newman/Haas/Lanigan Racing	221.692 mph (357 km/h)
24	8	(United States) Townsend Bell	KV Racing Technology	221.195 mph (356 km/h)
25	17	(Spain) Oriol Servià	Rahal Letterman Racing	220.984 mph (356 km/h)
26	34	(Canada) Alex Tagliani R	Conquest Racing	220.553 mph (355 km/h)
27	19	(South Africa) Tomas Scheckter	Dale Coyne Racing	220.212 mph (354 km/h)
28	24	(United Kingdom) Mike Conway R	Dreyer & Reinbold Racing	220.124 mph (354 km/h)
29	13	(Venezuela) E. J. Viso	HVM Racing	219.971 mph (354 km/h)
30	21	(United States) Ryan Hunter-Reay	Vision Racing	219.502 mph (353 km/h)
31	43	(United States) John Andretti	Richard Petty Motorsports/Dreyer & Reinbold	219.442 mph (353 km/h)
32	23	(Venezuela) Milka Duno	Dreyer & Reinbold Racing	218.040 mph (351 km/h)
33	00	(France) Nelson Philippe R	HVM Racing	218.032 mph (351 km/h)
OFFICIAL REPORT

=== Sunday May 17 – Bump day ===
- Weather: Sunny, 67 °F (19 °C)
- Television: Versus (Bob Jenkins, Robbie Buhl, Jon Beekhuis, Jack Arute, Robbie Floyd, Lindy Thackston)
- Practice summary

Favorable weather conditions during practice indicated that the track was faster than the previous afternoon. Milka Duno raised eyebrows after turning a lap of 221.568 mph, more than 3 mph faster than her standing qualifying speed. Veteran Bruno Junqueira took his first laps of the month, after landing a ride with Conquest Racing.

- Time trials summary

Saturday's two slowest qualifiers, Nelson Philippe and Milka Duno withdrew their times and re-entered the field at much higher speeds. Bruno Junqueira, in his first attempt, bumped John Andretti from the field with ease. In the late afternoon several third day qualifiers followed Philippe and Duno's lead and requalified at faster speeds. Tomas Scheckter withdrew his speed, and greatly improved. Andretti's first two attempts to re-enter the field were unsuccessful, as the team was struggling to trim the car out. With 20 minutes remaining, Andretti's second attempt was just shy of bumping in, and would have been fast enough to bump Tomas Scheckter had Scheckter not withdrawn and re-qualified. He was followed by Buddy Lazier and Stanton Barrett, and both waved off their slow attempts. Neither had managed to gain speed during the afternoon practice, and neither broke 219 mph.

At 5:52 p.m., John Andretti pulled away for his third and final allotted attempt, bumping Ryan Hunter-Reay with a 221.316 mph average. Hunter-Reay got the final attempt to enter the field, and bumped Alex Tagliani from the field by a scant 0.0324 seconds. The 6 o'clock gun, signaling the end of qualifying, fired during Hunter-Reay's run, leaving Tagliani and Lazier waiting in line.

May 17, 2009 – Bump Day Qualifying Results
Rank	Car No.	Driver	Team	Qual. Speed
26	19	(South Africa) Tomas Scheckter	Dale Coyne Racing	221.496 mph (356 km/h)
27	24	(United Kingdom) Mike Conway R	Dreyer & Reinbold Racing	221.417 mph (356 km/h)
28	43	(United States) John Andretti	Richard Petty Motorsports/Dreyer & Reinbold	221.316 mph (356 km/h)
29	13	(Venezuela) E. J. Viso	HVM Racing	221.164 mph (356 km/h)
30	36	(Brazil) Bruno Junqueira	Conquest Racing	221.115 mph (356 km/h)
31	23	(Venezuela) Milka Duno	Dreyer & Reinbold Racing	221.106 mph (356 km/h)
32	00	(France) Nelson Philippe R	HVM Racing	220.754 mph (355 km/h)
33	21	(United States) Ryan Hunter-Reay	Vision Racing	220.597 mph (355 km/h)
OFFICIAL REPORT

Shortly before midnight on May 17, Conquest Racing announced that Alex Tagliani, who had failed to qualify, would replace Bruno Junqueira in the No. 36 car. Because of the replacement, the car was moved to the last spot in the starting grid.

== Carb Day ==
=== IndyCar Series final practice ===
The final hour-long practice was held.

=== Pit Stop Contest ===
Team Penske won the 32nd annual Pit Stop Challenge, their record tenth overall victory in the event. The teams of Hélio Castroneves and Marco Andretti met in the finals with Castroneves and his chief mechanic Rick Rinaman winning the $40,000 first prize after a 7.962-second pit stop.

==== Qualification round ====
Rank	Car No.	Driver	Team	Time (seconds)
1	3	(Brazil) Hélio Castroneves	Penske Racing	8.122
2	26	(United States) Marco Andretti	Andretti Green Racing	9.038
3	9	(New Zealand) Scott Dixon	Chip Ganassi Racing	9.085
4	10	(United Kingdom) Dario Franchitti	Chip Ganassi Racing	9.105
5	7	(United States) Danica Patrick	Andretti Green Racing	9.246
6	21	(United States) Ryan Hunter-Reay	Vision Racing	9.37
7	11	(Brazil) Tony Kanaan	Andretti Green Racing	10.055
8	2	(Brazil) Raphael Matos	Luczo Dragon Racing	11.291
	6	(Australia) Ryan Briscoe	Penske Racing	Exempt
	02	(United States) Graham Rahal	Newman/Haas/Lanigan Racing	Exempt

Note: Positions 5–8 are eliminated from the competition. Positions 3–4 advance to the quarterfinals. Positions 1–2 received a bye for the quarterfinals, and advanced directly to the semi-finals. Ryan Briscoe and Graham Rahal were randomly selected to bypass the qualifying round and advance directly to the quarterfinals.

==== Elimination bracket ====
Quarterfinals
6	Ryan Briscoe (Team Penske)	7.977
9	Scott Dixon (Chip Ganassi Racing)	12.916
10	Dario Franchitti (Chip Ganassi Racing)	8.573
02	Graham Rahal (Newsman-Haas)	9.385

Semifinals
3	Hélio Castroneves (Team Penske)	7.636
6	Ryan Briscoe (Team Penske)	stalled
26	Marco Andretti (Andretti-Green)	8.931
10	Dario Franchitti (Chip Ganassi Racing)	11.589

Finals
3	Hélio Castroneves (Team Penske)	7.962
26	Marco Andretti (Andretti-Green)	9.456

== Starting grid ==
Row	Inside		Middle		Outside	
1	3	(Brazil) Hélio Castroneves W	6	(Australia) Ryan Briscoe	10	(United Kingdom) Dario Franchitti W
2	02	(United States) Graham Rahal	9	(New Zealand) Scott Dixon W	11	(Brazil) Tony Kanaan
3	5	(Brazil) Mario Moraes	26	(United States) Marco Andretti	12	(Australia) Will Power
4	7	(United States) Danica Patrick	99	(United Kingdom) Alex Lloyd	2	(Brazil) Raphael Matos R
5	15	(Canada) Paul Tracy	14	(Brazil) Vítor Meira	18	(United Kingdom) Justin Wilson
6	27	(Japan) Hideki Mutoh	20	(United States) Ed Carpenter	4	(United Kingdom) Dan Wheldon W
7	41	(United States) A. J. Foyt IV	16	(United States) Scott Sharp	67	(United States) Sarah Fisher
8	44	(United States) Davey Hamilton	06	(Netherlands) Robert Doornbos R	8	(United States) Townsend Bell
9	17	(Spain) Oriol Servià	19	(South Africa) Tomas Scheckter	24	(United Kingdom) Mike Conway R
10	43	(United States) John Andretti	13	(Venezuela) E. J. Viso	23	(Venezuela) Milka Duno
11	00	(France) Nelson Philippe R	21	(United States) Ryan Hunter-Reay	36	(Canada) Alex Tagliani R ^{1}

1. Alex Tagliani failed to qualify the #34 Conquest Racing entry, but replaced Bruno Junqueira in the team's #36 entry. Tagliani started from the 33rd position as a result of the driver change.
- W = Former Indianapolis 500 winner
- R = Indianapolis 500 rookie

Failed to qualify

No.	Driver	Team	Reason
34	(Canada) Alex Tagliani R	Conquest Racing	Bumped on Day 4. Replaced Junqueira in field.
91	(United States) Buddy Lazier W	Hemelgarn Racing	Bumped on Day 3. Too slow on Day 4.
98	(United States) Stanton Barrett R	Team 3G	Too slow on Day 3. Too slow on Day 4.

== Race ==
The green flag was waved off on the first attempt after Hélio Castroneves hit the accelerator in the middle of turn four and the field did not maintain its traditional three-row lineup. The second attempt, although similar in formation, was given the green flag.

During the first lap entering the first short chute, Mario Moraes squeezed Marco Andretti into the wall, crashing both drivers out. Both drivers were out, but Andretti returned briefly later in the race. Moraes held the view that Andretti ran into him, and both drivers expressed their frustration to the TV crews. Andretti said that Moraes is "clueless", while Moraes believed that Andretti checked down on him.

Ryan Hunter-Reay also had a crash on lap 20 which saw his car slide into the pit lane. This capped a brutal month of May for the Vision Racing driver, in which his car never seemed to get up to speed, and he barely even made the 500 field.

Graham Rahal and Davey Hamilton had similar crashes on laps 56 and 83 respectively. Both slowed their cars between turns 3 and 4, drifted up the track, and hit the wall on the front straightaway. Rahal had a similar crash in the 2008 race.

On lap 98, while running third Tony Kanaan suffered a driveshaft failure while at speed in the back stretch, pitching his car into the wall. Kanaan's steering was largely incapacitated and the Brazilian bounced off the backstretch wall and then hit the turn 3 wall. In television interviews, Kanaan appeared visibly shaken. The next day, Tony stated the hit was recorded at 175 G's.

During the first half of the 200-lap event, Scott Dixon, Castroneves and Dario Franchitti swapped the lead with the Dixon–Franchitti Target Chip Ganassi team leading much of the laps. Dixon led laps 91 through 141, with Franchitti close behind to protect him.

Drivers Robert Doornbos, Nelson Philippe, and Justin Wilson, all former Champ Car World Series race winners, had incidents in the middle-to-late stages of the race that ended their respective days. Under the caution for the Philippe incident, Franchitti's fueler got stuck in his car, causing him to lose track position. With nobody to block for him, Dixon was powerless on the restart to stop Castroneves from passing him. The Penske Dallara-Honda cleared Dixon before the cars even entered turn 1. It turned out to be the winning pass.

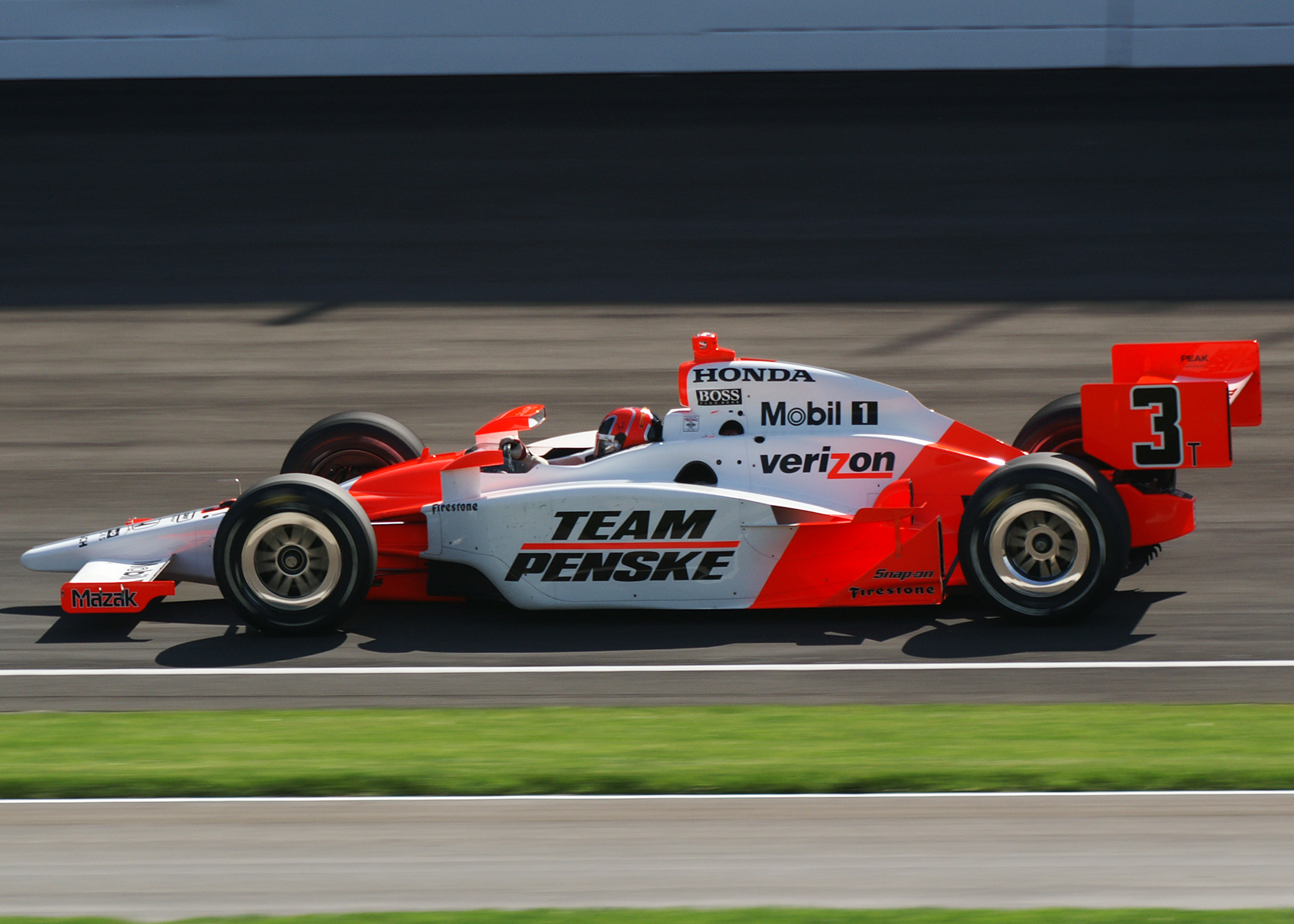
Hélio Castroneves won his third Indianapolis 500, following victories in 2001 and 2002.

The scariest incident of the day occurred on lap 173, when Vítor Meira and Raphael Matos collided in turn 1. Both had heavy contact with the wall. Meira's car also flipped on its side and slid along the wall for hundreds of feet before falling back to all four wheels on the track. Meira was taken to Methodist hospital after the incident. Meira broke two vertebrae in his back and spent the next two days in the hospital being fitted for a back brace. Matos suffered a bruised right knee in the crash.

Ryan Briscoe had fallen back to the middle of the pack with a bad set of tires, but short-fueled in a late round of pit stops to claim second place, behind teammate Castroneves. Eventually Briscoe attempted to take the lead, with the intention of pulling Castroneves along, in order to help the Brazilian save fuel by using the draft. However, he had to pit during the Meira–Matos caution and was never a factor to win.

In the final 15 laps, Castroneves maintained a gap over Dan Wheldon, Danica Patrick and Townsend Bell. Castroneves and Wheldon kept similar lap speeds of 218 mph through the last 15 laps, but with a gap of roughly eight car lengths and Patrick on his tail, Wheldon could not catch the pole-sitter.

Castroneves won the event as his sister, Kati, and mother celebrated. The driver and his crew engaged in his traditional victory celebration, climbing the frontstretch catch fence, to the delight of the crowd. It was his third career Indianapolis 500 victory, with the others coming in 2001 and 2002. He is the sixth driver to win three 500s and the first foreign-born driver to do so.

== Box score ==
Rank	No.	Driver	Team	Chassis	Engine	Laps	Status	Grid	Points
1	3	(Brazil) Hélio Castroneves W	Team Penske	Dallara	Honda	200	150.318 mph	1	51
2	4	(United Kingdom) Dan Wheldon W	Panther Racing	Dallara	Honda	200	+1.9819	18	40
3	7	(United States) Danica Patrick	Andretti Green Racing	Dallara	Honda	200	+2.3350	10	35
4	8	(United States) Townsend Bell	KV Racing Technology	Dallara	Honda	200	+2.7043	24	32
5	12	(Australia) Will Power	Team Penske	Dallara	Honda	200	+3.6216	9	30
6	9	(New Zealand) Scott Dixon W	Chip Ganassi Racing	Dallara	Honda	200	+4.2988	5	30
7	10	(United Kingdom) Dario Franchitti W	Chip Ganassi Racing	Dallara	Honda	200	+4.9159	3	26
8	20	(United States) Ed Carpenter	Vision Racing	Dallara	Honda	200	+5.5096	17	24
9	15	(Canada) Paul Tracy	KV Racing Technology	Dallara	Honda	200	+6.5180	13	22
10	27	(Japan) Hideki Mutoh	Andretti Green Racing	Dallara	Honda	200	+7.3312	16	20
11	36	(Canada) Alex Tagliani R	Conquest Racing	Dallara	Honda	200	+10.5351	33	19
12	19	(South Africa) Tomas Scheckter	Dale Coyne Racing	Dallara	Honda	200	+10.9874	26	18
13	99	(United Kingdom) Alex Lloyd	Chip Ganassi Racing/Sam Schmidt Motorsports	Dallara	Honda	200	+11.1944	11	17
14	16	(United States) Scott Sharp	Panther Racing	Dallara	Honda	200	+11.4259	20	16
15	6	(Australia) Ryan Briscoe	Team Penske	Dallara	Honda	200	+12.6695	2	15
16	41	(United States) A. J. Foyt IV	A. J. Foyt Enterprises	Dallara	Honda	200	+15.4867	19	14
17	67	(United States) Sarah Fisher	Sarah Fisher Racing	Dallara	Honda	200	+15.9774	21	13
18	24	(United Kingdom) Mike Conway R	Dreyer & Reinbold Racing	Dallara	Honda	200	+16.3488	27	12
19	43	(United States) John Andretti	Dreyer & Reinbold Racing/Richard Petty Motorsports	Dallara	Honda	200	+18.0868	28	12
20	23	(Venezuela) Milka Duno	Dreyer & Reinbold Racing	Dallara	Honda	199	-1 lap	30	12
21	14	(Brazil) Vítor Meira	A. J. Foyt Enterprises	Dallara	Honda	173	Contact	14	12
22	2	(Brazil) Raphael Matos R	Luczo-Dragon Racing	Dallara	Honda	173	Contact	12	12
23	18	(United Kingdom) Justin Wilson	Dale Coyne Racing	Dallara	Honda	160	Contact	15	12
24	13	(Venezuela) E. J. Viso	HVM Racing	Dallara	Honda	139	Steering	29	12
25	00	(France) Nelson Philippe R	HVM Racing	Dallara	Honda	130	Contact	31	10
26	17	(Spain) Oriol Servià	Rahal Letterman Racing	Dallara	Honda	98	Fuel pump	25	10
27	11	(Brazil) Tony Kanaan	Andretti Green Racing	Dallara	Honda	97	Contact	6	10
28	06	(Netherlands) Robert Doornbos R	Newman/Haas/Lanigan Racing	Dallara	Honda	85	Contact	23	10
29	44	(United States) Davey Hamilton	Dreyer & Reinbold Racing/Kingdom Racing	Dallara	Honda	79	Contact	22	10
30	26	(United States) Marco Andretti	Andretti Green Racing	Dallara	Honda	56	Handling	8	10
31	02	(United States) Graham Rahal	Newman/Haas/Lanigan Racing	Dallara	Honda	55	Contact	4	10
32	21	(United States) Ryan Hunter-Reay	Vision Racing	Dallara	Honda	19	Contact	32	10
33	5	(Brazil) Mario Moraes	KV Racing Technology	Dallara	Honda	0	Contact	7	10

W Former Indianapolis 500 winner

R Indianapolis 500 Rookie

All entrants utilized Firestone tires.

=== Race statistics ===
Lap Leaders
Laps	Leader
1–7	Hélio Castroneves
8–52	Dario Franchitti
53–63	Ryan Briscoe
64–85	Scott Dixon
86–90	Dario Franchitti
91–141	Scott Dixon
142–200	Hélio Castroneves

Total laps led
Driver	Laps
Scott Dixon	73
Hélio Castroneves	66
Dario Franchitti	50
Ryan Briscoe	11

Cautions: 8 for 61 laps
Laps	Reason
1–6	Mario Moraes, Marco Andretti crash in turn 2
21–27	Ryan Hunter-Reay crash in turn 2
57–62	Graham Rahal crash in turn 4
83–89	Davey Hamilton crash in turn 4
98–108	Tony Kanaan crash in turn 3
132–140	Nelson Philippe crash in turn 4
161–166	Justin Wilson crash in turn 1
174–182	Raphael Matos, Vítor Meira crash in turn 1

== Broadcasting ==
=== Television ===
The race was televised in high definition in the United States on ABC, the 45th consecutive year on that network. ABC Sports signed a four-year extension to continue covering the Indianapolis 500 through 2012. Marty Reid served as anchor for the fourth year. For the fourth time, the telecast utilized the Side-by-Side format for commercial breaks.

Time trials and Carb Day were shown live in high definition on Versus, part of a new ten-year contract with the network and the Indy Racing League. Bob Jenkins served as anchor, along with Robbie Buhl and Jon Beekhuis as analysts. Jack Arute, Robbie Floyd, and Lindy Thackston covered the pits.

ABC Television
Booth Announcers	Pit/garage reporters
Host: Brent Musburger; Announcer: Marty Reid; Color: Scott Goodyear; Color: Eddie Cheever	Jack Arute; Vince Welch; Brienne Pedigo; Jamie Little

=== Radio ===
The race was broadcast on radio by the IMS Radio Network. Mike King served as anchor. For the first time, three living "Voices of the 500" joined in to offer commentary during the pre-race. King, Paul Page, and Bob Jenkins recollected their experiences on network. Page remained in the booth to offer commentary and observations throughout the race. Jenkins, who had returned as a turn reporter in 2007–2008, was unable to serve during the race due to his commitments with Versus.

Jake Query moved from the pits to take the turn two location. For 2009, there were only three regular pit reporters, but they were joined by Dave Wilson, who moved from the booth to cover the garage area and infield hospital.

For 2009, as a gesture to the Centennial Era, a special change was made for the famous out-cue "Stay tuned for the greatest spectacle in racing." The out-cues for each commercial break were recordings of previous renditions by the former "Voices of the 500". Each commercial break would feature a different chief announcer, rotating through Sid Collins, Paul Page, Lou Palmer, Bob Jenkins, and Mike King.

Indianapolis Motor Speedway Radio Network
Booth Announcers	Turn Reporters	Pit/garage reporters
Chief Announcer: Mike King; Driver expert: Johnny Parsons; Historian: Donald Davidson; Live in-car reports: Davey Hamilton; Commentary: Paul Page; Commentary: Bob Jenkins	Turn 1: Jerry Baker; Turn 2: Jake Query; Turn 3: Mark Jaynes; Turn 4: Chris Denari	Dave Argabright (north pits); Kevin Olson (center pits); Kevin Lee (south pits); Dave Wilson (garages)

== See also ==
- List of Indianapolis 500 winners
- Indianapolis 500 year by year
- 2009 IndyCar Series season
- Indy Racing League IndyCar Series

2008 Indianapolis 500; Scott Dixon	2009 Indianapolis 500; Hélio Castroneves	2010 Indianapolis 500; Dario Franchitti
