= NASCAR on television in the 1980s =

Before the existence of ESPN, live coverage of NASCAR Winston Cup races on television was limited. CBS covered the Daytona 500, the June race at Michigan and the July race at Talladega. ABC usually did the Atlanta race in the spring.

== List of races televised ==
=== 1980 ===
Date	Event	Network	Lap-by-lap	Color commentator(s)	Reporters
2/10	Busch Clash (Daytona)	CBS	Ken Squier	David Hobbs	Ned Jarrett; Brock Yates
2/14	Twin 125's	CBS	Ken Squier	David Hobbs	Ned Jarrett; Brock Yates
2/17	Daytona 500	CBS	Ken Squier	David Hobbs	Ned Jarrett; Brock Yates
3/16	Atlanta 500	ABC	Al Michaels	Jackie Stewart	Chris Economaki
5/25	World 600 (Charlotte)	CBS	Ken Squier	David Hobbs	Ned Jarrett; Brock Yates
7/4	Firecracker 400 (Daytona)	ABC	Jim McKay	Sam Posey	Chris Economaki
7/27	Coca-Cola 500 (Pocono)	ABC	Chris Economaki	Jackie Stewart	
8/3	Talladega 500	CBS	Ken Squier	David Hobbs	Ned Jarrett; Brock Yates
9/1	Southern 500 (Darlington)	ABC	Jim Lampley	Sam Posey	Chris Economaki
10/5	National 500 (Charlotte)	NBC	Paul Page	Gary Gerould	
11/15	Los Angeles Times 500 (Ontario)	CBS	Ken Squier	David Hobbs	Ned Jarrett; Brock Yates

- The Los Angeles Times 500 was switched from Sunday to Saturday to accommodate live CBS Sports coverage.
- On May 29, 1980, CBS paid a fee of roughly US$50,000 or $100,000 to Charlotte Motor Speedway to broadcast the World 600 NASCAR stock car race. Benny Parsons edged out Darrell Waltrip to win a grand prize of $44,850 in a race that was watched by perhaps 3.7 million viewers on the network.
- Prior to the original 1999 contract between NASCAR and NBC, the network aired races such as the National 500 at Charlotte Motor Speedway from 1979 to 1981, the 1981 Mountain Dew 500 at Pocono International Raceway, the Winston 500 at Alabama International Motor Speedway from 1983 to 1985, and the Miami 300 and Pennzoil 400 at Homestead–Miami Speedway in both 1999 and 2000.

=== 1981 ===
Date	Event	Network	Lap-by-lap	Color commentator(s)	Reporters
1/11	Winston Western 500 (Riverside)	MRN TV	Mike Joy	Ned Jarrett	
2/8	Busch Clash (Daytona)	CBS	Ken Squier	Dale Earnhardt	Ned Jarrett; Brock Yates
2/12	UNO Twin 125's (Daytona)	CBS	Ken Squier	David Hobbs	Ned Jarrett; Brock Yates
2/15	Daytona 500	CBS	Ken Squier	David Hobbs	Ned Jarrett; Brock Yates
3/1	Carolina 500 (Rockingham)	ESPN	Bob Jenkins	Eli Gold	Ned Jarrett
3/15	Coca-Cola 500 (Atlanta)	ABC	Jim McKay	Jackie Stewart	Chris Economaki
4/26	Virginia 500 (Martinsville)	ESPN	Bob Jenkins	Eli Gold	Ned Jarrett
5/3	Winston 500 (Talladega)	ESPN	Dave Despain	Larry Nuber	Ned Jarrett
5/17	Mason-Dixon 500 (Dover)	ESPN	Bob Jenkins	Dick Berggren	Ned Jarrett
5/24	World 600 (Charlotte)	CBS	Ken Squier	David Hobbs	Ned Jarrett; Brock Yates
7/4	Firecracker 400 (Daytona)	ABC	Keith Jackson	Jackie Stewart	Chris Economaki
7/26	Mountain Dew 500 (Pocono)	NBC	Paul Page	Gary Gerould	
8/2	Talladega 500 (Talladega)	CBS	Ken Squier	Donnie Allison	Ned Jarrett; Brock Yates
9/7	Southern 500 (Darlington)	ABC	Bill Flemming	Jackie Stewart	Chris Economaki
10/11	National 500 (Charlotte)	NBC	Paul Page	Gary Gerould	
11/8	Atlanta Journal 500	ESPN	Mike Joy	Larry Nuber	Ned Jarrett

- ESPN broadcast its first race in 1981, from North Carolina Motor Speedway (its first live race was later in the year at Atlanta International Raceway), and TNN followed in 1991. All Cup races were nationally televised by 1985; networks struck individual deals with track owners, and multiple channels carried racing action. Many races were shown taped and edited on Wide World of Sports and syndication services like Mizlou and SETN, but almost all races were live by 1989.

=== 1982 ===
Date	Event	Network	Lap-by-lap	Color commentator(s)
2/7	Busch Clash (Daytona)	CBS	Ken Squier	Richard Petty and A. J. Foyt
2/14	Daytona 500	CBS	Ken Squier	David Hobbs
2/21	Richmond 400	ESPN	Bob Jenkins	Larry Nuber
3/21	Coca-Cola 500 (Atlanta)	ABC	Al Michaels	Sam Posey
4/4	CRC Chemicals Rebel 500 (Darlington)	ABC	Al Michaels	Jackie Stewart
5/2	Winston 500 (Talladega)	ESPN	Bob Jenkins	Larry Nuber
5/30	World 600 (Charlotte)	Mizlou	Dave Despain	Dick Brooks
6/6	Van Scoy 500 (Pocono)	Mizlou	Dave Despain	Dick Brooks
7/25	Mountain Dew 500 (Pocono)	Mizlou	Rick Benjamin	Dick Brooks
8/22	Champion Spark Plug 400 (Michigan)	ESPN	Bob Jenkins	Larry Nuber
9/6	Southern 500 (Darlington)	ABC	Bill Flemming	Jackie Stewart
9/12	Wrangler 400 (Richmond)	ESPN	Bob Jenkins	Larry Nuber
9/19	CRC Chemicals 500 (Dover)	Diamond P	Gil Stratton	Brock Yates
11/7	Atlanta Journal 500	ESPN	Bob Jenkins	Larry Nuber
11/21	Winston Western 500 (Riverside)	Mizlou	Ken Squier	Buddy Baker

- From 1982 to 1984, USA Network broadcast the UNO Twin 125s (now the Gander RV Duel). USA used CBS' crew, graphics and announcers. USA also aired the Atlanta ARCA race in 1985 and televised several NASCAR Busch Series races in the late 1980s.

=== 1983 ===
Date	Event	Network	Lap-by-lap	Color commentator(s)
2/14	Busch Clash (Daytona)	CBS	Ken Squier	David Hobbs
2/17	UNO Twin 125's (Daytona)	USA	Ken Squier	David Hobbs
2/20	Daytona 500	CBS	Ken Squier	David Hobbs
2/27	Richmond 400	TBS	Ken Squier	Cale Yarborough
3/13	Warner W. Hodgdon 500 (Rockingham)	ESPN	Bob Jenkins	Larry Nuber
5/1	Winston 500 (Talladega)	NBC	Paul Page	Johnny Rutherford
5/7	Marty Robbins 420 (Nashville)	TNN	Brock Yates	Steve Evans
5/15	Mason-Dixon 500 (Dover)	Mizlou	Ken Squier	Phil Parsons
5/29	World 600(Charlotte)	Mizlou	Ken Squier	Phil Parsons
7/4	Firecracker 400 (Daytona)	ABC	Bill Flemming	Sam Posey
7/24	Like Cola 500 (Pocono)	Mizlou	Ken Squier	Buddy Baker
7/31	Talladega 500	CBS	Ken Squier	David Hobbs and Ned Jarrett
9/18	Budweiser 500 (Dover)	TNN	Brock Yates	Steve Evans
10/9	Miller High Life 500 (Charlotte)	Mizlou	Ken Squier	Donnie Allison
11/6	Atlanta Journal 500	TBS	Ken Squier	Geoff Bodine
11/20	Winston Western 500 (Riverside)	TBS	Ken Squier	Cale Yarborough

- During its coverage of the 1983 Daytona 500, CBS introduced an innovation which director Bob Fishman helped develop – a miniature, remote-controlled in-car camera called RaceCam. Fishman directed every Daytona 500 telecast on CBS, with the exception of 1992, 1994 and 1998 because Fishman was away directing CBS' figure-skating coverage for the Winter Olympics.
- TBS broadcast the Richmond spring race, held the week after Daytona Speedweeks, from 1983 to 1995, as well as the fall races at Rockingham (1985-1987), Atlanta (1983-1985) and Riverside (1982-1987).
- TNN started showing races live in 1991, but it had aired taped coverage of a few Winston Cup races in the 1980s on its American Sports Cavalcade program.

=== 1984 ===
Date	Event	Network	Lap-by-lap	Color commentator(s)
2/12	Busch Clash (Daytona)	CBS	Ken Squier	Ned Jarrett
2/16	UNO Twin 125's (Daytona)	USA	Ken Squier	David Hobbs
2/19	Daytona 500	CBS	Ken Squier	David Hobbs and Ned Jarrett
2/26	Richmond 400 (Richmond)	TBS	Ken Squier	Buddy Baker
3/4	Carolina 500 (Rockingham)	SETN	Mike Joy	Benny Parsons
3/18	Coca-Cola 500 (Atlanta)	ABC	Jim McKay	Sam Posey
4/15	TransSouth 500 (Darlington)	ESPN	Bob Jenkins	Larry Nuber
5/12	Coors 420 (Nashville)	TBS	Ken Squier	Benny Parsons
5/20	Budweiser 500 (Dover)	Mizlou	Mike Joy	Phil Parsons
6/10	Van Scoy 500 (Pocono)	Mizlou/ESPN	Mike Joy (Mizlou); Bob Jenkins (ESPN)	Donnie Allison (Mizlou); Larry Nuber (ESPN)
7/4	Firecracker 400 (Daytona)	ABC	Jim Lampley	Sam Posey
7/22	Like Cola 500 (Pocono)	ESPN	Bob Jenkins	Larry Nuber
7/29	Talladega 500 (Talladega)	CBS	Ken Squier	Ned Jarrett and Benny Parsons
9/2	Southern 500 (Darlington)	ESPN	Bob Jenkins	Jack Arute
10/21	American 500 (Rockingham)	SETN	Mike Joy	Benny Parsons
11/11	Atlanta Journal 500 (Atlanta)	TBS	Ken Squier	Glenn Jarrett
11/18	Winston Western 500 (Riverside)	TBS	Ken Squier	Phil Parsons

- Special Events Television Network (SETN) is the name of a defunct syndicated television package that broadcast tape delayed NASCAR races from 1984 to 1988. SETN aired races (typically from Martinsville and Pocono as well as from Rockingham, Charlotte, Richmond and Daytona for good measure) that didn't have live television deals at the time. The broadcasts were aired on tape delay because certain promoters still feared that live telecasts would hurt their gate.

=== 1985 ===
Date	Event	Network	Lap-by-lap	Color commentator(s)
2/10	Busch Clash (Daytona)	CBS	Ken Squier	David Hobbs and Ned Jarrett
2/17	Daytona 500	CBS	Ken Squier	David Hobbs and Ned Jarrett
2/24	Richmond 400	TBS	Ken Squier	Benny Parsons
3/3	Carolina 500 (Rockingham)	SETN	Mike Joy	Benny Parsons
4/6	Valleydale Meats 500 (Bristol)	ESPN	Bob Jenkins	Benny Parsons
4/14	Transouth 500 (Darlington)	ESPN	Bob Jenkins	Larry Nuber
4/21	Northwestern Bank 400 (North Wilkesboro)	ESPN	Bob Jenkins	Larry Nuber
4/28	Sovran Bank 500 (Martinsville)	SETN	Mike Joy	Benny Parsons
5/5	Winston 500 (Talladega)	NBC	Paul Page	Bobby Unser
5/25	The Winston (Charlotte)	Jefferson-Pilot	Mike Joy	Kyle Petty
5/26	Coca-Cola World 600 (Charlotte)	Jefferson-Pilot	Mike Joy	Johnny Hayes
6/2	Budweiser 400 (Riverside)	TNN	Steve Evans	Brock Yates
6/9	Van Scoy 500 (Pocono)	ESPN	Bob Jenkins	Larry Nuber
6/16	Miller 400 (Michigan)	CBS	Ken Squier	Ned Jarrett
7/4	Pepsi Firecracker 400 (Daytona)	ABC	Al Trautwig	Sam Posey
7/28	Talladega 500	CBS	Ken Squier	Ned Jarrett
8/24	Busch 500 (Bristol)	ESPN	Larry Nuber	Benny Parsons
9/1	Southern 500 (Darlington)	ESPN	Larry Nuber	Jack Arute
9/8	Wrangler Sanfor-Set 400 (Richmond)	SETN	Mike Joy	Benny Parsons
9/15	Delaware 500 (Dover)	Mizlou	Mike Hogewood	Dick Brooks
9/22	Goody's 500 (Martinsville)	SETN	Mike Joy	Benny Parsons
10/6	Miller Genuine Draft 500 (Charlotte)	Jefferson-Pilot	Mike Hogewood	Johnny Hayes
10/20	Nationwise 500 (Rockingham)	TBS	Ken Squier	Benny Parsons
11/3	Atlanta Journal 500	TBS	Ken Squier	Dick Brooks
11/17	Winston Western 500 (Riverside)	TBS	Ken Squier	Benny Parsons

- All Cup races were nationally televised by 1985; networks struck individual deals with track owners, and multiple channels carried racing content. Many races were shown taped and edited on Wide World of Sports and syndication services like Mizlou and SETN, but almost all races were live by 1989.

=== 1986 ===
Date	Event	Network	Lap-by-lap	Color commentator(s)
2/9	Busch Clash	CBS	Ken Squier	Ned Jarrett and David Hobbs
2/16	Daytona 500	CBS	Ken Squier	Ned Jarrett and David Hobbs
2/23	Richmond 400	TBS	Ken Squier	Benny Parsons
3/16	Motorcraft 500	ABC	Jim Lampley	Sam Posey
4/6	Valleydale Meats 500 (Bristol)	ESPN	Bob Jenkins	Larry Nuber
4/13	Transouth 500 (Darlington)	ESPN	Bob Jenkins	Jack Arute
4/20	First Union 400 (North Wilkesboro)	ESPN	Bob Jenkins	Benny Parsons and Larry Nuber
4/27	Sovran Bank 500 (Martinsville)	SETN	Mike Joy	Benny Parsons
5/4	Winston 500 (Talladega)	ESPN	Bob Jenkins	Larry Nuber
5/11	The Winston (Atlanta)	ESPN	Bob Jenkins	Larry Nuber and Benny Parsons
5/18	Budweiser 500 (Dover)	Mizlou	Steve Grad	Dick Brooks
6/1	Budweiser 400 (Riverside)	TNN	Steve Evans	Brock Yates
6/8	Miller High Life 500 (Pocono)	SETN	Mike Joy	Jerry Punch
7/20	Summer 500 (Pocono)	SETN	Mike Joy	Jerry Punch
7/27	Talladega 500	CBS	Ken Squier	Ned Jarrett and Neil Bonnett
8/10	Bud at the Glen (Watkins Glen)	ESPN	Bob Jenkins	Rick Mears
8/17	Champion Spark Plug 400 (Michigan)	ESPN	Jack Arute	Jerry Punch
8/23	Busch 500 (Bristol)	ESPN	Bob Jenkins	Larry Nuber and Benny Parsons
9/14	Delaware 500 (Dover)	Mizlou	Steve Grad	Dick Brooks
9/21	Goody's 500 (Martinsville)	SETN	Eli Gold	Jerry Punch
9/28	Holly Farms 400 (North Wilkesboro)	ESPN	Larry Nuber	Benny Parsons
10/19	Nationwise 500 (Rockingham)	TBS	Ken Squier	Benny Parsons
11/2	Atlanta Journal 500	ESPN	Bob Jenkins	Larry Nuber
11/16	Winston Western 500 (Riverside)	TBS	Ken Squier	Phil Parsons

=== 1987 ===
Date	Event	Network	Lap-by-lap	Color commentator(s)
2/8	Busch Clash (Daytona)	CBS	Ken Squier	Ned Jarrett and David Hobbs
2/12	7-Eleven Twin 125's (Daytona)	CBS (tape delayed to 2/14)	Ken Squier	Ned Jarrett and David Hobbs
2/15	Daytona 500	CBS	Ken Squier	Ned Jarrett and David Hobbs
3/8	Miller High Life 400 (Richmond)	TBS	Ken Squier	Lake Speed
3/15	Motorcraft 500	ABC	Jim Lampley	Sam Posey
3/29	TranSouth 500 (Darlington)	ESPN	Larry Nuber	Jerry Punch
4/5	First Union 400 (North Wilkesboro)	ESPN	Bob Jenkins	Larry Nuber
4/12	Valleydale Meats 500 (Bristol)	ESPN	Bob Jenkins	Larry Nuber
4/26	Sovran Bank 500 (Martinsville)	SETN	Eli Gold	Jerry Punch
5/3	Winston 500 (Talladega)	ESPN	Bob Jenkins	Larry Nuber
5/17	The Winston (Charlotte)	ABC	Keith Jackson	Donnie Allison
5/31	Budweiser 500 (Dover)	ESPN	Larry Nuber	Jerry Punch
6/14	Miller High Life 500 (Pocono)	SETN	Eli Gold	Jerry Punch
7/4	Pepsi Firecracker 400 (Daytona)	ABC	Keith Jackson	Donnie Allison
8/22	Busch 500 (Bristol)	ESPN	Bob Jenkins	Larry Nuber
9/13	Wrangler Indigo 400 (Richmond)	SETN	Eli Gold	Jerry Punch
9/20	Delaware 500 (Dover)	ESPN	Bob Jenkins	Larry Nuber
9/27	Goody's 500 (Martinsville)	SETN	Eli Gold	Jerry Punch
11/8	Winston Western 500 (Riverside)	TBS	Ken Squier	Johnny Hayes and Buddy Baker
11/22	Atlanta Journal 500	ESPN	Bob Jenkins	Larry Nuber

=== 1988 ===
Date	Event	Network	Lap-by-lap	Color commentator(s)
2/7	Busch Clash (Daytona)	CBS	Ken Squier	Ned Jarrett and Chris Economaki
2/11	Twin 125's (Daytona)	CBS (tape delayed to 2/13)	Ken Squier	Ned Jarrett and Chris Economaki
2/14	Daytona 500	CBS	Ken Squier	Ned Jarrett and Chris Economaki
2/21	Pontiac Excitement 400 (Richmond)	TBS	Ken Squier	Johnny Hayes
3/20	Motorcraft Quality Parts 500	ABC	Keith Jackson	Jerry Punch
3/27	TranSouth 500 (Darlington)	ESPN	Bob Jenkins	Ned Jarrett
4/10	Valleydale Meats 500 (Bristol)	ESPN	Bob Jenkins	Ned Jarrett and Gary Nelson
4/17	First Union 400 (North Wilkesboro)	ESPN	Bob Jenkins	Ned Jarrett and Gary Nelson
5/1	Winston 500 (Talladega)	ESPN	Bob Jenkins	Gary Nelson and Ned Jarrett
5/22	The Winston (Charlotte)	ABC	Keith Jackson	Jerry Punch
5/29	Coca-Cola 600 (Charlotte)	TBS	Ken Squier	Johnny Hayes
6/12	Budweiser 400 (Riverside)	ESPN	Bob Jenkins	Ned Jarrett
6/19	Miller High Life 500 (Pocono)	FNN/Score	Pat Patterson	Bob Latford
6/26	Miller High Life 400 (Michigan)	CBS	Ken Squier	Ned Jarrett and Chris Economaki
7/2	Pepsi Firecracker 400 (Daytona)	ABC	Paul Page	Johnny Rutherford
7/31	DieHard 500 (Talladega)	CBS	Ken Squier	Ned Jarrett and Chris Economaki
8/21	Champion Spark Plug 400 (Michigan)	ESPN	Bob Jenkins	Ned Jarrett and Gary Nelson
8/27	Busch 500 (Bristol)	ESPN	Bob Jenkins	Ned Jarrett and Gary Nelson
9/4	Southern 500 (Darlington)	ESPN	Bob Jenkins	Ned Jarrett and Gary Nelson
9/11	Miller High Life 400 (Richmond)	TBS	Ken Squier	Johnny Hayes
9/18	Delaware 500 (Dover)	ESPN	Bob Jenkins	Ned Jarrett and Gary Nelson
9/25	Goody's 500 (Martinsville)	ESPN	Bob Jenkins	Gary Nelson and Ned Jarrett
10/16	Holly Farms 400 (North Wilkesboro)	ESPN	Jerry Punch	Ned Jarrett
10/23	AC Delco 500 (Rockingham)	ESPN	Bob Jenkins	Ned Jarrett and Gary Nelson
11/6	Checker 500 (Phoenix)	ESPN	Bob Jenkins	Ned Jarrett
11/20	Atlanta Journal 500	ESPN	Bob Jenkins	Ned Jarrett and Gary Nelson

- After SETN folded, one Pocono race a year was produced by Jim Wiglesworth on pay-per-view for Viewer's Choice (now In Demand) from 1988 to 1990. They were not a huge success, as fans were reluctant to pay for what they could see last week for free. The Viewer's Choice shows were noteworthy in that they premiered viewer phone-in questions during the races.

=== 1989 ===
Date	Event	Network	Lap-by-lap	Color commentator(s)
2/12	Busch Clash (Daytona)	CBS	Ken Squier	Ned Jarrett and Chris Economaki
2/16	Twin 125's (Daytona)	CBS (tape delayed to 2/18)	Ken Squier	Ned Jarrett and Chris Economaki
2/19	Daytona 500	CBS	Ken Squier	Ned Jarrett and Chris Economaki
3/19	Motorcraft Quality Parts 500 (Atlanta)	ABC	Paul Page	Bobby Unser and Sam Posey
4/16	First Union 400 (North Wilkesboro)	ESPN	Bob Jenkins	Ned Jarrett and Gary Nelson
5/7	Winston 500 (Talladega)	ESPN	Bob Jenkins	Ned Jarrett and Benny Parsons
5/21	The Winston (Charlotte)	ABC	Paul Page	Benny Parsons and Bobby Unser
5/28	Coca-Cola 600 (Charlotte)	TBS	Ken Squier	Johnny Hayes
6/4	Budweiser 500(Dover)	ESPN	Bob Jenkins	Ned Jarrett and Benny Parsons
6/11	Banquet Frozen Foods 300 (Sears Point)	ESPN	Bob Jenkins	Ned Jarrett and Benny Parsons
6/18	Miller High Life 500 (Pocono)	PPV	Dave Despain	Lyn St. James and Gary Nelson
7/1	Pepsi 400 (Daytona)	ESPN	Bob Jenkins	Ned Jarrett and Benny Parsons
7/23	AC Spark Plug 500 (Pocono)	ESPN	Bob Jenkins	Ned Jarrett and Benny Parsons
7/30	DieHard 500 (Talladega)	CBS	Ken Squier	Ned Jarrett and Chris Economaki
8/13	Bud at the Glen (Watkins Glen)	ESPN	Bob Jenkins	Ned Jarrett and Benny Parsons
9/10	Miller High Life 400 (Richmond)	TBS	Ken Squier	Johnny Hayes and Phil Parsons
9/17	Peak Performance 500 (Dover)	ESPN	Bob Jenkins	Ned Jarrett and Benny Parsons
9/24	Goody's 500 (Martinsville)	ESPN	Bob Jenkins	Ned Jarrett and Benny Parsons
10/8	All Pro Auto Parts 500 (Charlotte)	TBS	Ken Squier	Johnny Hayes and Joe Ruttman
10/15	Tyson Holly Farms 400 (North Wilkesboro)	ESPN	Bob Jenkins	Ned Jarrett and Benny Parsons
11/5	Autoworks 500 (Phoenix)	ESPN	Bob Jenkins	Ned Jarrett and Benny Parsons
11/19	Atlanta Journal 500 (Atlanta)	ESPN	Bob Jenkins	Ned Jarrett and Benny Parsons

- At the 1989 Motorcraft Quality Parts 500 NASCAR event, ESPN/ABC broadcaster Dr. Jerry Punch was reporting from the pit stall of Richard Petty when a fire broke out, injuring two crew members who Punch proceeded to treat on the spot. Following the incident, in which several items of Punch's clothing were singed or melted, ESPN mandated that its pit reporters wear Racing suit. Other networks have since adopted the practice.

== See also ==
- List of Daytona 500 broadcasters
- List of Wide World of Sports (American TV series) announcers
- List of events broadcast on Wide World of Sports (American TV series)
- NASCAR on television in the 1960s
  - NASCAR on television in the 1970s
  - NASCAR on television in the 1990s
  - NASCAR on television in the 2000s
  - NASCAR on television in the 2010s
