= ESPN SpeedWorld =

Television series

- Title card used from 1987 to 1992.
- Starring: Bob Jenkins; Larry Nuber; Marty Reid; Dr. Jerry Punch; Bob Varsha; Paul Page; Dave Despain; Jackie Stewart
- Country of origin: United States

Production
- Running time: 1 to 4 hours (depends on Live or Tape Delay event)

Original release
- Network: ESPN and ESPN2
- Release: October 7, 1979 – November 12, 2006

ESPN SpeedWorld (formerly Auto Racing '79–'86) is a former television series broadcast on ESPN from 1979 to 2006. The program that was based primarily based around NASCAR, CART, IMSA, Formula One, NHRA, and IHRA. The theme music is based on the piano interlude from "18th Avenue (Kansas City Nightmare)" by Cat Stevens.

== History ==
=== ESPN Auto Racing (1979–1986) ===
When ESPN debuted in 1979, one of the first sporting events that they covered was auto racing. Initially the name of the show routinely changed to fit with the corresponding year at the time. Thus, when the program debuted, it was called Auto Racing '79, and then Auto Racing '80, Auto Racing '81 and so forth. This practice was dropped after 1986, when the name of the program was changed to SpeedWorld. The original commentators were primarily Bob Jenkins and Larry Nuber, who covered many diverse types of competition. Ultimately, by 1987, SpeedWorld's coverage encompassed not only Formula One, IndyCar, NASCAR Winston Cup (and its feeder series such as Busch Grand National, ASA, and ARCA), and IMSA Sportscar Racing, but also racing less familiar to the average person, such as NHRA drag racing, USAC sprints and midgets, rallying, motorcycle racing, monster trucks and more. So many types of racing that were vastly different meant that specialization in broadcasting teams was necessary, so while Jenkins and Nuber continued with Winston Cup coverage, newer faces such as Paul Page and Bob Varsha began to take their places for broadcasts of other racing.

=== Impact of NASCAR ===
ESPN began showing NASCAR races in 1981 with the first event being at North Carolina Motor Speedway, which brought NASCAR to huge popularity. The last of its 265 Cup telecasts (that number includes some on ABC Sports) was the 2000 Atlanta fall race (now the Folds of Honor QuikTrip 500). ESPN and ESPN2 continued to air Craftsman Truck Series races in 2001 and 2002.

=== SpeedWorld's final years ===
After losing the rights to NASCAR Winston Cup (and Busch Series) broadcasts for the 2001 season (as well as Formula One to Speedvision in 1998, although for a while when Speedvision/Speed Channel aired Formula One, ABC were allowed to broadcast selected, mostly North American, Grands Prix), ESPN slowly began losing the remainder of their racing to other networks. For their 2002 season, CART signed a TV contract with Speed Channel and CBS, ending ESPN's partnership with CART that had begun 20 years before. NASCAR's Craftsman Truck Series left ESPN, also for Speed Channel, in 2003. For 2004 the International Race of Champions likewise moved to the Speed Channel. Since ESPN's reporters were no longer allowed (by NASCAR) to report from within the racetrack for RPM 2Night segments (due to their contract with Fox and NBC/TNT), the weeknight show eventually came to an end. However, ESPN was not completely without racing, as Indy Racing League, its Indy Pro Series development championship, and the NHRA were still on ESPN's lineup.

The SpeedWorld blanket title was discontinued in 2006; the final event aired under the branding was an NHRA championship event in Pomona Raceway. Sister network ABC maintained a package of IndyCar events produced by ESPN (pay television rights are held by NBCSN). NASCAR events would return to ESPN and ABC from 2007 to 2014, holding rights to the NASCAR Sprint Cup and Nationwide Series; these events were instead branded as NASCAR on ESPN. After the NHRA left ESPN for Fox after the 2015 season and the IndyCar Series left after 2018, the only motorsports coverage on the ESPN networks are Formula One races on ABC, ESPN, and ESPN2 (which is simulcast with Comcast-owned British broadcaster Sky Sports) and, for 2023, the Superstar Racing Experience (SRX) series, which saw the revival of the Thursday Night Thunder name. Formula One's new broadcast contract with Apple TV+ starting in 2026, along with the collapse of SRX before the start of its 2024 season, will mark the end of motorsports programming on ESPN, although starting in August 2026, NASCAR O'Reilly Auto Parts Series races will be streamed live on ESPN Unlimited thanks to an agreement with rights holders The CW, which will see their sports broadcasts streamed on the platform.

== On-air staff ==
This list does NOT include those who appeared on the air on ABC only, or were not a part of ESPN before 2007.

=== Commentators ===
- Griff Allen (NHRA)
- Jack Arute (IndyCar and occasional NASCAR broadcasts)
- John Bisignano (Formula One)
- Mike Chamberlin (off road racing - such as MTEG)
- Rick DeBruhl (IMSA, Thursday Night Thunder and occasional F1 broadcasts)
- Dave Despain (NASCAR, AMA Supercross, AMA Flat Track and USAC, including Saturday Night Thunder)
- Ray Dunlap (occasional NASCAR Craftsman Truck Series broadcasts in its early years, Hooters Pro Cup)
- Art Eckman (AMA Supercross)
- Chris Economaki (Formula One, Indianapolis 500 qualifying)
- Bruce Flanders (Trans-Am)
- Robbie Floyd (AMA Supercross)
- Gary Gerould (CART, Dayton Indy Lights, NHRA)
- Eli Gold (NASCAR as a co-commentator / analyst - primarily in 1981)
- Todd Harris (Indy Racing League)
- Jim Hendrick ((offshore powerboat racing and unlimited hydroplane racing)
- Elizabeth Hulette (offshore powerboat racing, select OPT races, select APBA races and select SBI races in 1994 and in 1995)
- Bob Jenkins (NASCAR, select IMSA races, select ARCA races, select F1 races, CART IndyCar, and IRL)
- Mike Joy (early NASCAR broadcasts, including ESPN's first live NASCAR race at Atlanta in 1981, World of Outlaws)
- Mike King (IRL Indy Pro Series)
- Brian Kreisky (Formula 1 - primarily in 1983)
- Gary Lee (USAC - including Saturday Night Thunder, Indy Lights)
- Larry Maiers (AMA Supercross)
- Dave McClelland (NHRA)
- Chris McClure (American Racing Series)
- Larry Nuber (NASCAR, USAC, IHRA, Formula One and IndyCar)
- Paul Page (CART, IRL, IMSA, and NHRA)
- Dr. Jerry Punch (NASCAR)
- Marty Reid (IRL, NASCAR, NHRA, off road racing (SCORE, CORR), Chili Bowl)
- Mike Raymond (NASCAR in Australia in 1988 - simulcast of Seven Sport coverage)
- Ken Squier (IMSA, Barber Saab Pro Series)
- Jackie Stewart (Formula One)
- Simon Taylor (Formula One - primarily in 1984)
- Bob Varsha (Formula One, IHRA & Sports Car events such as the 24 Hours of Le Mans)
- John Watson (Formula One - primarily in 1997)

=== Expert analysts (drivers and crew chiefs) ===
- Bill Adam (IMSA and other Sports Car races)
- David Bailey (AMA Supercross)
- Jon Beekhuis (CART Indy Lights, occasional CART Champ Car races)
- Derek Bell (Formula One)
- Robbie Buhl (Indy Pro Series)
- Doc Bundy (junior formula racing series, such as Barber Saab)
- Jeff Burton (International Race of Champions, or IROC)
- Steve Chassey (Saturday Night Thunder)
- Eddie Cheever (Formula One - primarily in 1996)
- Peter Collins (occasional Formula One races, such as the 1987 Mexican Grand Prix)
- Jeremy Dale (Craftsman Truck Series)
- Derek Daly (Formula One and IndyCar)
- Rob Dyson (occasional IMSA GTP races)
- Gil de Ferran (Indy Racing League in 2004)
- Ray Evernham (occasional NASCAR Cup, IROC & NASCAR Truck races - primarily on ABC broadcasts)
- Chip Ganassi (1984 Mid-Ohio IndyCar 200)
- Don Garlits (NHRA)
- Tom Gloy (Trans-Am, Formula Atlantics)
- Scott Goodyear (Indy Racing League and IROC)
- Davey Hamilton (Indy Pro Series)
- Bobby Hillin Jr. (occasional NASCAR Late Model races)
- David Hobbs (Formula One and Sports Car racing)
- Innes Ireland (occasional Formula One races, such as Monza in 1987)
- Ned Jarrett (NASCAR and ARCA)
- Gordon Johncock (IndyCar)
- Parker Johnstone (CART FedEx Championship)
- Parnelli Jones (occasional USAC races)
- P. J. Jones (occasional CART FedEx Championship Series races)
- Bart Kendall (Pikes Peak Hill Climb - primarily in 1995)
- Tommy Kendall (occasional CART FedEx Championship Series races)
- Rick Mears (1986 Bud at The Glen Winston Cup race)
- Gary Nelson (NASCAR)
- Benny Parsons (NASCAR, ARCA and IROC)
- Phil Parsons (NASCAR)
- Dan Pastorini (NHRA)
- Cruz Pedregon (NHRA)
- Kyle Petty (NASCAR and ARCA)
- Sam Posey (IROC on both ABC and ESPN)
- Jason Priestley (Indy Racing League)
- Scott Pruett (occasional CART FedEx Championship Series races, Barber Saab Pro Series)
- Bobby Rahal (American Racing Series)
- Larry Rice (Saturday Night Thunder and other USAC related events, Indy Racing League, NASCAR Modifieds, Hooters Pro Cup)
- Nigel Roebuck (Formula One)
- Johnny Rutherford (IndyCar)
- Elton Sawyer (early SuperTruck races)
- Dorsey Schroeder (occasional Winston Cup road races, such as Watkins Glen in 1993)
- Scott Sharp (IROC)
- Mike Skinner (Craftsman Truck Series, 2002 Florida Dodge Dealers 250)
- Tom Sneva (IRL)
- K. C. Spurlock (NHRA)
- Denny Stephenson (AMA Supercross)
- Lyn St. James (occasional CART IndyCar World Series races, such as Cleveland in 1995)
- Danny Sullivan (CART and IRL)
- Ken Tyrrell (occasional Formula One races, such as Estoril in 1987)
- Rusty Wallace (IRL in 2006)
- Rodger Ward (IndyCar)
- Bill Werner (AMA Flat Track)
- Frank Williams (occasional Formula One races, such as Jerez in 1987)

=== Pit reporters and RPM 2Night contributors ===
- James Allen (Formula One, CART)
- Jack Arute (CART, IRL, and NASCAR)
- Jon Beekhuis (CART)
- Dick Berggren (NASCAR, World of Outlaws)
- John Bisignano (Formula One)
- Ray Dunlap (NASCAR)
- Chris Economaki (NASCAR in Australia in 1988 - simulcast of Seven Sport coverage)
- Steve Evans (NHRA)
- Bruce Flanders (occasional USAC races)
- Mike Gallaway (off road racing, such as MTEG)
- Gary Gerould (CART, IRL, NHRA, select NASCAR races)
- Jonathan Green (Formula One)
- Todd Harris (IRL)
- Eddie Irvine (Formula One, 1994 Monaco Grand Prix)
- Gary Lee (CART, IMSA)
- Jamie Little (IRL and NASCAR)
- Larry Maiers (AMA Flat Track)
- Andrew Marriott (Formula One)
- Kenny Mayne (RPM 2Night)
- Chris McClure (North American Super Touring)
- Larry Nuber (IndyCar and NASCAR)
- Benny Parsons (was an occasional pit reporter for NASCAR broadcasts before his permanent booth position)
- Kyle Petty (NASCAR)
- Dr. Jerry Punch (NASCAR, CART, and IRL)
- Marty Reid (Formula One, CART, IHRA, IRL, NASCAR, sports cars, USAC)
- Leandra Reilly (NASCAR)
- Ralph Sheheen (Sports car racing)
- Walt Stannard (Formula One)
- Lyn St. James (IndyCar)
- Darrell Waltrip (IROC)
- Bill Weber (NASCAR)
- Vince Welch (IRL)
- Matt Yocum (NASCAR in 2000)

== See also ==
- NASCAR on ESPN
