= 1995 Brickyard 400 =

Race details
- Race 19 of 31 in the 1995 NASCAR Winston Cup Series
- 1995 Brickyard 400 program cover
- Date: August 5, 1995
- Location: Indianapolis Motor Speedway, Indianapolis, Indiana
- Course: Permanent racing facility
- Course length: 2.5 miles (4.0 km)
- Distance: 160 laps, 400 mi (643 km)
- Weather: Warm with temperatures approaching 79 °F (26 °C); wind speeds up to 14 miles per hour (23 km/h)
- Average speed: 155.206 miles per hour (249.780 km/h)

Pole position
Driver	Jeff Gordon	Hendrick Motorsports

Most laps led
Driver	Bill Elliott	Elliott-Hardy Racing
- Laps: 47

Winner
No. 3	Dale Earnhardt	Richard Childress Racing

Television in the United States
- Network: ESPN
- Announcers: Bob Jenkins; Benny Parsons

The 1995 Brickyard 400, the second running of the event, was a NASCAR Winston Cup Series race held on Saturday August 5, 1995. It was the 19th race of the 1995 NASCAR Winston Cup Series. The race, contested over 160 laps, was won by Dale Earnhardt driving for Richard Childress. Rusty Wallace driving for Roger Penske finished second and Dale Jarrett driving for Robert Yates finished third.

The popular event returned for a second year, after the tremendous success of the first running. The weekend was expanded by the addition of practice on Wednesday afternoon. Defending race winner Jeff Gordon won the pole position, his first of three Brickyard poles. Rain washed out the second round of qualifying, and threatened to wash out race day as well. After a lengthy delay, the race got started in the late afternoon, and ran well into the evening. Due to the rain delay, the race was not televised live, one of the last NASCAR races not broadcast live.

== Background ==
Indianapolis Motor Speedway is one of six superspeedways to hold NASCAR races, the others being Michigan International Speedway, Auto Club Speedway, Daytona International Speedway, Pocono Raceway and Talladega Superspeedway. The standard track at Indianapolis Motor Speedway is a four-turn rectangular-oval track that is 2.5 miles (4.0 km) long. The track's turns are banked at 9 degrees, while the front stretch, the location of the finish line, has no banking. The back stretch, opposite of the front, also has none. The racetrack has seats for 250,000 spectators.

Before the race, Jeff Gordon led the Drivers' Championship with 2,705 points, with Sterling Marlin in second and Dale Earnhardt in third. Mark Martin and Ted Musgrave filled the next two positions, with Morgan Shepherd, Rusty Wallace, Michael Waltrip, Terry Labonte and Bill Elliott rounded out the top ten. Gordon was the race's defending champion.

A total of 53 cars were on the official entry list, but four were scratched. A total of 49 cars arrived to the garage area, down from at least 84 the year before. For 1995, drivers from the Winston West Series were not offered a provisional spot, thus very few showed up. In addition, much fewer one-off entries materialized.

== Practice and qualifying ==
=== Wednesday August 2 – Practice ===
The schedule for the 1995 Brickyard 400 was expanded to add a practice session on Wednesday afternoon. A total of 48 cars took to the track, with Jeremy Mayfield the only car not taking laps. Jeff Gordon (171.894 mph) turned the fast lap, followed by Rusty Wallace and Bill Elliott. No incidents were reported.

=== Thursday August 3 – Pole qualifying ===
Defending race winner Jeff Gordon won the pole position with a stock car track record speed of 172.536 mph. A hot day saw most speeds down, and Gordon was the only driver to break the existing track record. Bobby Hamilton put the fans on their feet when he put the popular Petty #43 Pontiac car on the outside of the front row with a run of 172.222 mph. Others that made the field included Sterling Marlin, Bill Elliott, Dale Earnhardt and Mark Martin.

The first day of qualifying was scheduled to lock-in starting positions 1st–20th. Darrell Waltrip (170.380 mph) qualified 20th, the last car locked-in. Robert Pressley was 21st, the first car that missed out on speed. Others that failed to make the top twenty were Ricky Rudd, Rusty Wallace, Geoff Bodine, and Dale Jarrett. A. J. Foyt ranked 47th out of 48 cars.

Only two of the 50 cars entered failed to make a qualifying attempt. Joe Ruttman blew an engine during practice and was pulled out of the qualifying line. Danny Sullivan withdrew after suffering a career-ending crash at the Michigan 500 the weekend prior.

Locked-in cars
SP	No.	Driver	Speed
1	24	Jeff Gordon	172.536
2	43	Bobby Hamilton	172.222
3	4	Sterling Marlin	171.553
4	94	Bill Elliott	171.409
5	18	Bobby Labonte	171.233
6	87	Joe Nemechek	171.138
7	30	Michael Waltrip	171.051
8	98	Jeremy Mayfield	171.012
9	1	Rick Mast	170.969
10	25	Ken Schrader	170.956
11	15	Dick Trickle	170.943
12	11	Brett Bodine	170.836
13	3	Dale Earnhardt	170.775
14	6	Mark Martin	170.739
15	5	Terry Labonte	170.736
16	32	Greg Sacks	170.694
17	77	Bobby Hillin Jr.	170.593
18	8	Jeff Burton	170.461
19	16	Ted Musgrave	170.390
20	17	Darrell Waltrip	170.380

Failed to qualify in round 1
Pos.	No.	Driver	Speed
21	33	Robert Pressley	170.274
22	10	Ricky Rudd	170.248
23	37	John Andretti	170.174
24	2	Rusty Wallace	170.052
25	7	Geoff Bodine	169.965
26	28	Dale Jarrett	169.856
27	9	Lake Speed	169.699
28	41	Ricky Craven	169.690
29	26	Hut Stricklin	169.479
30	31	Ward Burton	169.440
31	81	Kenny Wallace	169.418
32	42	Kyle Petty	169.119
33	21	Morgan Shepherd	168.995
34	75	Todd Bodine	168.982
35	22	Jimmy Hensley	168.356
36	40	Rich Bickle	168.350
37	12	Derrike Cope	168.309
38	23	Jimmy Spencer	168.143
39	44	Jeff Purvis	168.136
40	95	Loy Allen Jr.	167.923
41	90	Mike Wallace	167.857
42	71	Dave Marcis	167.835
43	27	Elton Sawyer	167.592
44	29	Steve Grissom	167.153
45	66	Billy Standridge	167.016
46	78	Pancho Carter	166.744
47	50	A. J. Foyt	166.193
48	65	Steve Seligman	164.261
—	80	Joe Ruttman	no speed

- Source: The Indianapolis Star

=== Friday August 4 – Second round qualifying ===
The second round of qualifying was scheduled for Friday August 4, to fill positions 21st–38th. Positions 39th–43rd were to be set aside for provisionals. Teams were permitted to stand on their times from Thursday, or erase their time and re-qualify from scratch.

The remnants of Hurricane Erin overtook the midwest, and rain settled in for two days. Friday morning practice was lost, and second round qualifying was also rained out. As a result, all cars reverted to their time trials speed from the first round, and the field was filled accordingly. Without an opportunity in second round qualifying, A. J. Foyt notably failed to qualify, the first time he failed to qualify in a race he attempted at the Indianapolis Motor Speedway since arriving as a rookie in 1958. The field managed a brief "happy hour" practice late Friday evening, then rain began to fall again.

Steve Grissom, Mike Wallace, and Elton Sawyer were assigned the provisionals, and the field was set at 41 cars. The former champion's provisional was not needed.

==== Failed to qualify ====
- 44-Jeff Purvis – Too slow
- 50-A. J. Foyt – Too slow
- 65-Steve Seligman – Too slow
- 66-Billy Standridge – Too slow
- 71-Dave Marcis – Too slow
- 78-Pancho Carter – Too slow
- 95-Loy Allen Jr. – Too slow
- 80-Joe Ruttman – Did not make an attempt
- 14-Randy MacDonald – Withdrew
- 84-Norm Benning – Withdrew
- 88-Gary Bradberry – Withdrew
- 73-Phil Barkdoll – Did not arrive
- 32-Chuck Bown – Replaced by Greg Sacks
- 99-Danny Sullivan – Withdrew after his career-ending crash in the Marlboro 500 at Michigan
- 95-Scott Brayton – Testing crash; replaced by Loy Allen Jr.

== Race report ==
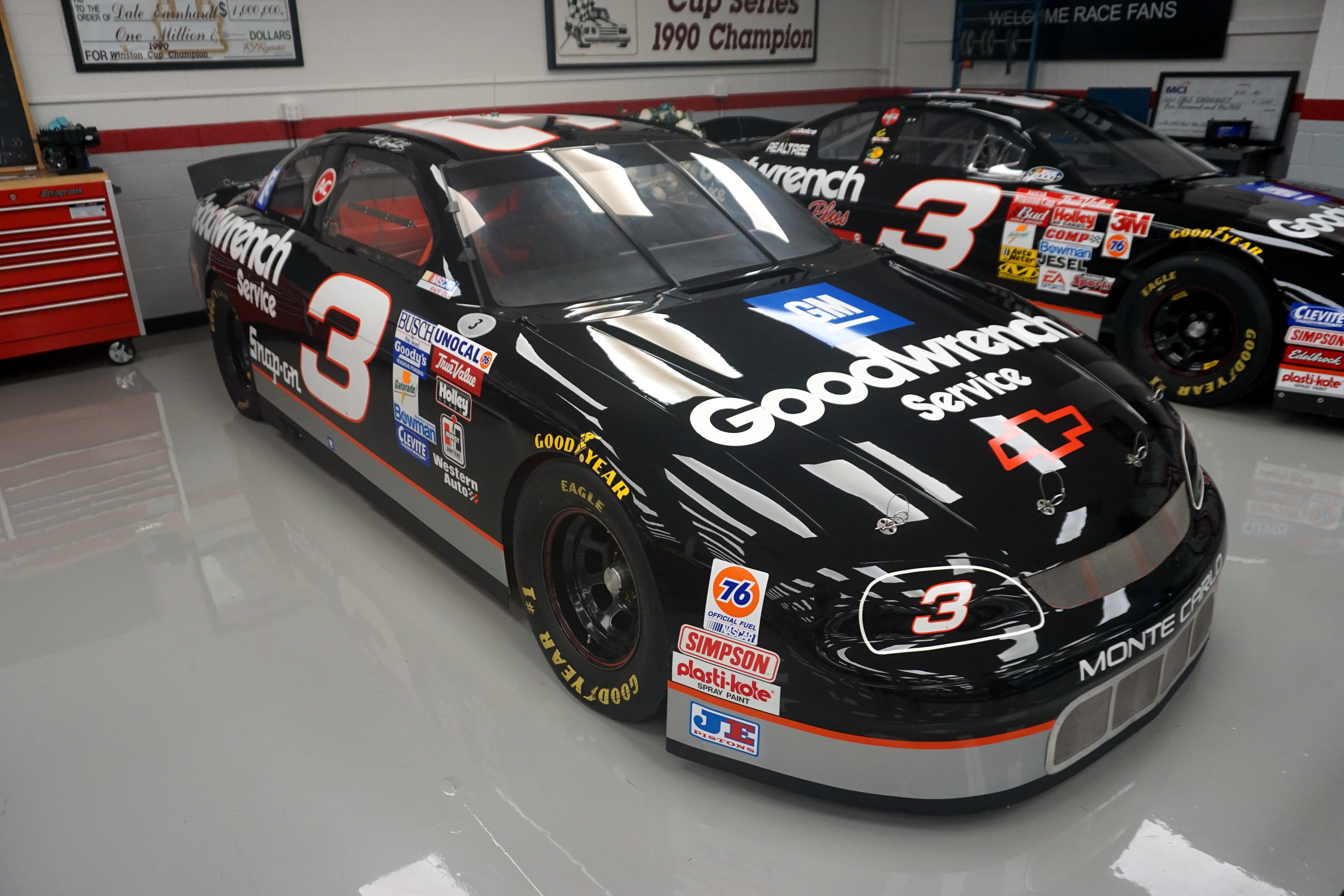
Dale Earnhardt's 1995 Brickyard 400-winning No. 3 GM Goodwrench Chevrolet Monte Carlo

On Saturday August 5, steady rain fell all morning, and threatened to wash out the day. The forecast was marginal for Sunday as well, threatening to wash out the whole weekend. Many fans left the grounds as local media speculated (and some erroneously reported) that the race would be postponed. In an unexpected turn of events, at approximately 3:30 p.m. EST (4:30 p.m. EDT), the skies suddenly cleared, and track drying efforts began in earnest. The teams scrambled to get their cars prepared, and the field was told to line up at the exit of Gasoline Alley. NASCAR intended to start the race as soon as possible. The Chevrolet Silverado safety truck led them on to the track and the race began with many fans still scurrying to their seats. Many of the pit crews were also scrambling to get their equipment set up in the pit area. Some fans driving home on the interstate reportedly turned around and drove back to the track when IMS Radio anchor Mike Joy reported the race was starting. Pace laps allowed the cars to dry the track further in preparation for a start

The green flag dropped at 4:25 p.m. EST (5:25 p.m. EDT) with live coverage only on the radio. ABC-TV had already signed off and by then had decided to air the race on ESPN on tape delay on Sunday afternoon. It stands as one of the last NASCAR races not aired live on television (the 1996 DieHard 500 at Talladega, a CBS race, had its broadcast delayed a week, airing after the Brickyard 400, and the 2000 second-tier series Coca-Cola 300 at Texas Motor Speedway, also a CBS race, had its broadcast cancelled, a ploy by MTV Networks to close CBS offices in Charlotte and Nashville). ABC's decision prompted angry phone calls from their affiliate TV stations in North Carolina.

Because of the rain earlier in the day, the starting grid was assembled in the garage area rather than along pit lane or frontstretch as normal. After the command to start engines, the field emerged from behind the pit road grandstands near turn one to begin their pace laps. While this was the only time such a situation occurred, it nevertheless provided for an impromptu, yet dramatic entrance of the cars onto the race track.

Dale Earnhardt beat Rusty Wallace to the finish line, in a race slowed by only one caution for four laps. Jeff Burton spun off turn two right in front of eventual winner Earnhardt with 27 laps to go. The race was completed at 7:03 p.m. EST (8:03 p.m. EDT), less than an hour before sunset. It was the latest cars had ever raced at Indianapolis until the 2017 Brantley Gilbert Big Machine Brickyard 400, which ended at 8:57 p.m. EDT (Indiana had begun daylight saving time observation by the time). From 2022 to 2026, the Intercontinental GT Challenge Indianapolis 8 Hours has featured a finish in darkness past 8:00 p.m. EDT. The latest finish to an Indianapolis 500 was in 2024, which after rain and lightning delays started at 4:44 p.m. EDT and finished at 7:43 p.m. EDT, 32 minutes before a curfew time of 8:15 p.m. EDT imposed by Marion County authorities.

=== Race results ===
Pos	SP	No.	Driver	Manufacturer	Entrant	Laps	Status
1	13	3	Dale Earnhardt	Chevrolet	Richard Childress Racing	160	Running
2	24	2	Rusty Wallace	Ford	Penske Racing	160	Running
3	26	28	Dale Jarrett	Ford	Robert Yates Racing	160	Running
4	4	94	Bill Elliott	Ford	Elliott-Hardy Racing	160	Running
5	14	6	Mark Martin	Ford	Roush Racing	160	Running
6	1	24	Jeff Gordon	Chevrolet	Hendrick Motorsports	160	Running
7	3	4	Sterling Marlin	Chevrolet	Morgan-McClure Motorsports	160	Running
8	9	1	Rick Mast	Ford	Richard Jackson	160	Running
9	5	18	Bobby Labonte	Chevrolet	Joe Gibbs Racing	160	Running
10	33	21	Morgan Shepherd	Ford	Wood Brothers Racing	160	Running
11	2	43	Bobby Hamilton	Pontiac	Petty Enterprises	160	Running
12	23	37	John Andretti	Ford	Kranefuss-Haas Racing	160	Running
13	15	5	Terry Labonte	Chevrolet	Hendrick Motorsports	160	Running
14	7	30	Michael Waltrip	Pontiac	Bahari Racing	160	Running
15	25	7	Geoffrey Bodine	Ford	Geoff Bodine Racing	160	Running
16	19	16	Ted Musgrave	Ford	Roush Racing	160	Running
17	20	17	Darrell Waltrip	Chevrolet	DarWal Inc.	160	Running
18	11	15	Dick Trickle	Ford	Bud Moore Engineering	160	Running
19	10	25	Ken Schrader	Chevrolet	Hendrick Motorsports	160	Running
20	22	10	Ricky Rudd	Ford	Rudd Performance Motorsports	159	Running
21	34	75	Todd Bodine	Ford	Butch Mock Motorsports	159	Running
22	29	26	Hut Stricklin	Ford	King Racing	159	Running
23	38	23	Jimmy Spencer	Ford	Travis Carter Enterprises	159	Running
24	12	11	Brett Bodine	Ford	Junior Johnson & Associates	159	Running
25	32	42	Kyle Petty	Pontiac	Team SABCO	159	Running
26	40	90	Mike Wallace	Ford	Donlavey Racing	158	Running
27	6	87	Joe Nemechek	Chevrolet	NEMCO Motorsports	158	Running
28	21	33	Robert Pressley	Chevrolet	Leo Jackson Motorsports	158	Running
29	8	98	Jeremy Mayfield	Ford	Cale Yarborough Motorsports	158	Running
30	39	29	Steve Grissom	Chevrolet	Diamond Ridge Motorsports	158	Running
31	28	41	Ricky Craven	Chevrolet	Larry Hedrick Motorsports	158	Running
32	35	22	Jimmy Hensley	Pontiac	Bill Davis Racing	158	Running
33	16	32	Greg Sacks	Chevrolet	Dick Brooks Racing	157	Flagged
34	27	9	Lake Speed	Ford	Melling Racing	157	Running
35	30	31	Ward Burton	Chevrolet	Bill Davis Racing	154	Engine
36	31	81	Kenny Wallace	Ford	FILMAR Racing	154	Running
37	36	40	Rich Bickle	Pontiac	Dick Brooks Racing	152	Running
38	18	8	Jeff Burton	Ford	Stavola Brothers Racing	141	Running
39	17	77	Bobby Hillin Jr.	Ford	Jasper Motorsports	106	Engine
40	37	12	Derrike Cope	Ford	Bobby Allison Motorsports	104	Engine
41	41	27	Elton Sawyer	Ford	Junior Johnson & Associates	17	Valve

=== Race statistics ===
- Time of race: 2:34:38
- Average speed: 155.206 miles per hour (249.780 km/h)
- Pole speed: 172.536 miles per hour (277.670 km/h)
- Cautions: 1 for 4 laps
- Margin of victory: 0.370 seconds
- Lead changes: 17
- Percent of race run under caution: 2.5%
- Average green flag run: 78 laps

Lap leaders
Laps	Leader
1–31	Jeff Gordon
32–33	Bill Elliott
34	John Andretti
35	Bobby Hillin Jr.
36–50	Sterling Marlin
51–66	Bill Elliott
67–68	Bobby Labonte
69	John Andretti
70–71	Rusty Wallace
72–100	Bill Elliott
101–102	Ken Schrader
103	Michael Waltrip
104	John Andretti
105–108	Jeff Gordon
109–128	Rusty Wallace
129	Bobby Hamilton
130–132	John Andretti
133–160	Dale Earnhardt

Total laps led
Laps	Leader
47	Bill Elliott
35	Jeff Gordon
28	Dale Earnhardt
22	Rusty Wallace
15	Sterling Marlin
6	John Andretti
2	Bobby Labonte
2	Ken Schrader
1	Bobby Hamilton
1	Michael Waltrip
1	Bobby Hillin Jr.

Cautions: 1 for 4 laps
Laps	Reason
133–136	#8 (Jeff Burton) crash backstraight

== Media ==
=== Television ===
The 1995 Brickyard 400 was supposed to be carried live on television by ABC Sports. Paul Page, who was the announcer on ABC's Indianapolis 500 broadcasts, served as host. Bob Jenkins and 1973 Cup Series champion Benny Parsons called the race from the broadcast booth. Jerry Punch, Jack Arute and Gary Gerould handled pit road for the television side. Due to a rain delay, ABC left the race and it was aired the following day on ESPN.

ABC / ESPN
Host	Booth announcers		Pit reporters
Host	Lap-by-lap	Color-commentators	Pit reporters
Paul Page	Bob Jenkins	Benny Parsons	Jerry Punch; Jack Arute; Gary Gerould
