= Spain (surname) =

Spain is a surname of Norman, English and Irish origin. As of 1881, there were 754 bearers of the surname in Great Britain, most of whom were located in Kent; by 2016, the amount in Great Britain had increased to 1050. As of 2010, there were 11,628 people with the surname Spain in the United States.

== People ==
- Adrian Spain, U.S. Air Force general
- Alfred Spain (1868–1954), Australian architect
- Amy Spain (c.1848–1865), American slave
- Christale Spain, American politician
- Colin Spain, Irish hurler
- Daphne Spain, American academic who studies urban and environmental planning
- Douglas Spain (born 1974), American film and television actor
- Eileen Spain, American chemist
- Elsie Spain (1879–1970), English opera singer
- Emira D'Spain, Emirati-American model and social media influencer
- Fay Spain, American actress
- Frances Lander Spain (1903–1999), American librarian
- Francis Spain (1909–1977), American amateur ice hockey player
- Frank K. Spain (1927–2006), American inventor and television engineer
- James W. Spain (1926–2008), American diplomat
- Jayne Spain, American businesswoman
- Jenny Spain, American actress
- Karl Spain (born 1971), Irish comedian
- Ken Spain (1946–1990), American basketball player
- Ken Spain (political strategist), American political and communications strategist
- Mark Spain (actor) (born 1971), Australian child actor
- Mick Spain (1932–2011), Irish hurler
- Nancy Spain (1917–1964), English broadcaster and journalist
- Patrick Spain (born 1952), CEO of First Stop Health, LLC
- Quinton Spain (born 1991), American football player
- Robert Spain (politician) (born 1956), American politician
- Robert Hitchcock Spain (1925–2022), American Methodist bishop
- Sarah Spain (born 1980), American sports reporter
- Susan Spain-Dunk (1880–1962), English composer, conductor and violinist/violist
- Truman Spain (1913–1968), American football player
- William Spain (1803–1876), English lawyer
- W. J. Spain (1865–1936), Irish Gaelic footballer and hurler

== See also ==
- Míl Espáine, Mythical ancestor of the final inhabitants of Ireland
- The Makem and Spain Brothers, an Irish-American folk music band
- Despain, surname
- Despaigne, surname
