= Despain =

Despain, DeSpain, or D'Spain is a surname. Notable people with the surname include:

- Bree Despain (born 1979), American author
- Dave Despain (born 1946), American motorsport journalist
- Don G. Despain (1940–2022), American botanist, plant ecologist, and fire behavior specialist
- Emira D'Spain (born 1996), American model, influencer, and television personality
- Michelle Despain (born 1984), Argentine-American luger
- Pleasant DeSpain (born 1943), American author

== See also ==
- Despaigne
- Spain (surname)
