= IndyCar Series (video game) =

2003 video game

- Developer: Brain in a Jar
- Publisher: Codemasters
- Platforms: PlayStation 2, Xbox, Windows
- Release: May 20, 2003: PlayStation 2, Xbox; NA: May 20, 2003 (PS2); EU: June 20, 2003; NA: June 24, 2003 (Xbox); AU: June 27, 2003; Windows; EU: September 12, 2003; AU: September 19, 2003; NA: September 23, 2003
- Genre: Racing
- Modes: Single-player, multiplayer

IndyCar Series is a racing simulator developed by Brain in a Jar and published by Codemasters. The game was released in 2003 for PlayStation 2, Xbox, and Windows. The game is based on the 2002 Indy Racing League. A sequel to the game, IndyCar Series 2005, was released in 2004 for PlayStation 2 and Xbox based on the 2003 IndyCar Series.

== Gameplay ==
The gameplay features racing on oval circuits with an IndyCar single-seater car. Players choose one team and compete in one of three modes (Quick Races, Championship, or Test Drive) around the official oval tracks from the 2002 IndyCar calendar.

== Drivers ==
The game features 26 drivers from the 2002 Indy Racing League. The driver list includes 24 of the regular teams and drivers along with two of the Indy 500 only entries from Target Chip Ganassi Racing and Team Green.

== Reception ==
Reception

Aggregate score
Aggregator	Score		
Aggregator	PC	PS2	Xbox
Metacritic	72/100	69/100	71/100

Review scores
Publication	Score		
Publication	PC	PS2	Xbox
Computer Games Magazine	3.5/5	N/A	N/A
Edge	N/A	8/10	8/10
Eurogamer	N/A	7/10	N/A
Game Informer	N/A	7/10	7.5/10
GameSpot	7.1/10	6/10	6/10
GameSpy	N/A	2/5	3/5
GameZone	7.8/10	8.3/10	N/A
IGN	N/A	8.5/10	8/10
Official U.S. PlayStation Magazine	N/A	3/5	N/A
Official Xbox Magazine (US)	N/A	N/A	8.1/10
PC Gamer (US)	78%	N/A	N/A
BBC Sport	N/A	70%	N/A

The game received "average" reviews on all platforms according to the review aggregation website Metacritic. Eurogamer's Roman Jennings described the PlayStation 2 version not as open-wheel racing game as Formula One 2003 nor arcade like Burnout 2, but as a well made racing sim game.
