= Special Events Television Network =

Defunct syndicated television package

Greensboro, North Carolina; United States
- Branding: SETN

Programming
- Language(s): English
- Affiliations: See list of stations

Ownership
- Owner: Jim Wiglesworth

History
- First air date: 1984
- Last air date: 1988

Special Events Television Network (SETN) is the name of a defunct syndicated television package that broadcast tape delayed NASCAR races from 1984 to 1988. SETN aired races (typically from Martinsville and Pocono as well as from Rockingham, Charlotte, Richmond and Daytona for good measure) that didn't have live television deals at the time. The broadcasts were aired on tape delay because certain promoters still feared that live telecasts would hurt their gate. SETN also sold VHS videos of some races it carried, with additional footage not seen on TV. In addition to its stock car racing, the network produced twelve telecasts of International Hot Rod Association events.

SETN was headed by Jim Wiglesworth (father of Survivor: Borneo runner up Kelly Wiglesworth) out of Greensboro, North Carolina. SETN was underfunded, and since profits were slim, so were rights fees. Ultimately, the growing popularity of racing on ESPN as well as the overall lack of cash flow drove them out of the business. SETN ceased operations in June 1988; the first Pocono race that year was seen on the Financial News Network's Score weekend sports service, and Martinsville, the last holdout against live television rights, signed an ESPN deal for its fall race.

After SETN folded, one Pocono race a year was produced by Jim Wiglesworth on pay-per-view for Viewer's Choice (now In Demand) from 1988 to 1990. They were not a huge success, as fans were reluctant to pay for what they could see last week for free. The Viewer's Choice shows were noteworthy in that they premiered viewer phone-in questions during the races.

== Commentators ==
=== Lap-by-lap ===
- Dave Despain
- Eli Gold
- Mike Joy

=== Color commentary ===
- Dick Berggren
- Benny Parsons
- Ron Bouchard
- Phil Parsons
- Jerry Punch

=== Pit road ===
- Bob Heiss
- Pat Patterson

== Stations ==
City	Station
Atlanta	WVEU 69
Baltimore	WBFF 45
Birmingham	WVTM 13
Boston	WSBK 38
Buffalo	WKBW 7
Burlington	WVNY 22
Charlotte	WBTV 3
Chicago	WGN 9
Cincinnati	WKRC 12
Columbia	WOLO 25
Columbus	WTVN 6
Cleveland	WUAB 43
Dallas/Fort Worth	KTVT 11
Dayton	WHIO 7
Denver	KWGN 2
Des Moines	KDSM 17
Detroit	WGPR 62
Fort Wayne	WFFT 55
Greensboro	WXII 12
Hartford/New Haven	WVIT 30
Houston	KHOU 11; KHTV 39
Indianapolis	WTTV 4
Kansas City	KCTV 5
Las Vegas	KLAS 8
Los Angeles	KTTV 11; KHJ 9
Louisville	WDRB 41
Memphis	WPTY 24; WMC 5
Miami/Fort Lauderdale	WPLG 10
Milwaukee	WITI 6
Minneapolis/St. Paul	KMSP 9
New Orleans	WGNO 26
New York City	WOR 9
Norfolk	WAVY 10
Oklahoma City	KOKH 25
Philadelphia	WTAF 29; WGBS 57
Phoenix	KNXV 15
Pittsburgh	WPGH 53
Providence	WLNE 6
Raleigh/Durham	WTVD 11
Richmond	WXEX 8
Rochester	WOKR 13
Sacramento	KTXL 40
Salt Lake City	KSL 5
San Diego	KTTY 69
San Francisco/Oakland	KTVU 2
Seattle/Tacoma	KSTW 11
Springfield	WWLP 22
St. Louis	KDNL 30
Tampa/St. Petersburg	WTOG 44
Washington, D.C.	WDCA 20
West Palm Beach	WTVX 34
