= Narrative Strategies =

American public relations company

- Industry: Public affairs and public relations
- Founded: 2019
- Founders: Ken Spain, Ed Mullen, Patrick O'Connor, Katie Mitchell
- Headquarters: Washington, D.C., United States
- Number of locations: Washington, D.C., South Florida, and New York City
- Website: narrativestrategies.com

Narrative Strategies (Narrative) is a strategic communications firm founded in 2019 and headquartered in Washington, D.C. The firm advises corporations, trade associations, coalitions, and nonprofit organizations on matters involving business, public policy, and reputation management.

== History and Founding ==
Narrative was founded in 2019 by Ken Spain, Ed Mullen, Patrick O'Connor, and Katie Mitchell, who previously worked at CGCN Group, a Washington-based Republican issue advocacy and strategic firm.

In 2021, Narrative added Devin O'Malley, former communications aide to republican Governor-elect Glenn Youngkin's election campaign. In the same year, Narrative also added Jill Farquharson, a former Senate aide to Tom Carper (D-Del.), to solidify itself as a bipartisan firm.

In 2024, Narrative announced a strategic partnership with Clarion Capital Partners and expanded its offices to New York City and West Palm Beach.

In 2024, Narrative also added Daraka Satcher, former Chief of Staff for Rep. Hank Johnson (D-GA) to grow the firm's services in stakeholder mapping, public affairs campaigns, and third-party engagement.

In 2025, Narrative added former PhRMA pollster Mark Keida to launch the firm's polling, message testing, and research offerings within the firm's Insights vertical.

== Industry Recognition ==
In 2024, the Reed Awards named Narrative as a Public Affairs Firm of the Year.

In 2025, Narrative was recognized in The Washington Post's Washington Top Workplaces 2025. Ragan’s Zenith Awards also named Narrative’s managing director Matt Moon as a Leader of the Year. Narrative was also named on the Inc. 5000 list.

In 2025, PR News Agency Elite Top 120 named Narrative Strategies as a recipient of the 2026 PR News Agency Elite Top 120.

In November 2025, The Wall Street Journal cited polling conducted by Narrative on public sentiment toward the artificial intelligence industry in an opinion article examining growing concerns about AI.
