= Griff Allen =

Motorsports broadcaster and promoter

Griff Allen is an American motorsports broadcaster, engineer, and actor/performer. Allen is known for his appearances on ESPN2 as host, reporter and analyst for ESPN SpeedWorld, the Outdoor Channel, Spike TV, Speed Channel, and other programming.

Allen performs live analysis and commentary for: AMA Superbike, ASRA, CCS, monster truck events, motocross, arenacross, drifting, rock crawling, car shows, major industry trade shows and auto shows.

Allen served as the national spokesperson for the Toyo TiresTake it to the Track program - which discourages illegal street racing. He has appeared frequently on local TV stations nationwide addressing issues of transportation-related public safety.

== Career ==
=== Engineering ===
Allen worked in steel production, fluid systems component manufacturing, actuator development and investment casting. On 20 October 1998, he was awarded patent number 5,822,989 for his work in developing a fuel-saving clutch mechanism used in the heavy trucking industry along with co-inventors Michael L. Sturdevant and Edward T. Schneider. Allen holds a bachelor's degree in mechanical engineering.

=== Acting ===
Allen appeared as Captain Georg von Trapp in The Sound of Music and William Harrison Brent in the Ohio premier of Perfect Crime at Chagrin Valley Little Theatre. He appeared as Mark Ferris in London Suite and Mike Connor in High Society with The Gates Mills Players - where he also directed the Pulitzer Prize for Drama nominated play Love Letters by A. R. Gurney. He also appeared as Brett - a police officer in the 2001 HBO film Proximity, and as a Desk Sergeant in the 2004 Christopher K. Young film Sugar. Allen appeared as a CDC Official in Diagnosis: Unknown on the Discovery Health Channel. He has appeared in numerous radio and television commercials - most notably for Summit Racing Equipment.

=== Motorsports broadcasting ===
Allen hosted the 2008 AMA Sports Banquet at the Barber Vintage Motorsports Museum.
