= SpeedWeek =

- Country of origin: United States
- No. of episodes: 661

Production
- Running time: 30 minutes

Original release
- Network: ESPN
- Release: 1984 – 1997

Related
- RPM2Night

SpeedWeek is an American television program on ESPN. For fourteen years, the weekly show aired multiple times in a week. When SpeedWeek ended in 1997, it was the longest-running motorsports magazine show. SpeedWeek covered multiple genres of motorsports, including stock cars, modifieds, sprint cars, midgets, and off-road racing.

== History ==
The show debuted in 1984 featuring Bob Jenkins and Larry Nuber. Nuber left the show in 1989. Jenkins remained as the show's sole host throughout the rest of its run. SpeedWeeks' hosts described American motorsports events from the previous week and previewed upcoming events. Jenkins received a 1990 nomination for an ACE (Award for Cable Excellence) Award in the "Sports Host" category.

The program was produced in Indianapolis throughout nearly it entire run. For a period of time, it was taped at the studios of WXIN.

The show ended in late 1997. By that time, ESPN2 was broadcasting RPM 2Night.

== Cast ==
- Bob Jenkins (host)
- Larry Nuber (co-host until 1989)
- Dave Despain (guest host)

== See also ==
- List of programs broadcast by ESPN
- List of longest running U.S. cable television series
