= WindTunnel with Dave Despain =

- Also known as: WindTunnel
- Genre: Auto racing Sports talk
- Presented by: Dave Despain
- Country of origin: United States

Original release
- Network: Speed
- Release: February 22, 2003 – August 11, 2013

WindTunnel with Dave Despain was a live viewer call-in and a sports talk show exclusively for auto racing fans that debuted on Speed Channel on February 22, 2003, and ended on August 11, 2013. During the course of the show, host Dave Despain fielded telephone calls and read e-mail from viewers, some of them directed at the guest Despain is interviewing, which was done just after the first segment, titled "Hot Topics", which Despain reads the big stories from the racing world. After the interview segment, Despain did a segment just for him, titled "My Take", in which he gave his opinion on news from the racing world. There was also an award for the best e-mail or phone call from each show, as the winning viewer received a Despain bobblehead. It was a coveted prize among viewers.

When WindTunnel debuted, the show aired Friday nights at 11 pm. The pilot episode was only a half-hour long. The time length was changed to an hour the very next week. In August 2003, WindTunnel expanded to four nights a week (Monday-Thursday) and moved to a 9 pm timeslot. In 2005, to the chagrin of some of the series' fans, WindTunnel was scaled back to one night a week, airing for two hours beginning at 9 pm on Sunday nights. In 2006, WindTunnel was scaled back to one hour. There have been special episodes of WindTunnel shown as part of the lead-up to the Daytona 500 and the Sprint All-Star Race.

The 2006 season brought about guest co-hosts in the form of racing personalities like drivers (such as Tony Stewart, Mario Andretti) and journalists (such as David Hobbs, Robin Miller, Ed Hinton, and Bob Varsha). In 2009, Despain began to take breaks during the season; guest hosts such as Krista Voda, Tommy Kendall, and Robin Miller have presented the show while Despain was off. Before this, only Ralph Sheheen in 2004 had replaced Despain for an episode due to illness.

The show would take a hiatus following the last NASCAR Sprint Cup race to late January during the racing off-season. During this time, best-of episodes titled WindTunnel: The Interviews were shown. Only the most popular interviews from the previous season were shown, which included interviews with NASCAR great Richard Petty, NASCAR star Jeff Gordon, and drag racing legend John Force. Starting in 2009 Golden Corral, an American restaurant chain, became the show's sponsor. Previous sponsors have been Carquest, an automobile parts store chain in 2007, and Alltel, a cell phone company in 2008.

== Programming segments ==
- Hot Topics - Highlights from the weekend's races and motorsports news.
- Super 7 Sweep - An online fantasy racing game that awarded autographed Dave Despain Bobbleheads to each weekly winner plus season's end championship prizes.
- Fired Up (2006-2012) – A short segment with callers (via voice mail) expressing heated opinions about topics regarding motorsports.
- Eye Candy – A high energy musical video package including clips from that weekend's races.
- My Take – A short editorial segment where Despain offers his opinion on a controversial topic in motorsports, usually offering a potentially simple solution to a complex problem.
- Stat Rat (debuted July 15, 2007) - A reference of statistics regarding the performance of a team, driver, or manufacturer over a specific time period. While not a regular segment, it is used to highlight a guest's achievements.
- Last Call – The last call from a viewer or a driver. Last call is announced by a graphic of what is likely intended to be an Italian bartender, but fans call him the "pizza guy" saying he looks like a worker in a pizza restaurant and that his long sleeves would get wet if he were a bartender. Despain counters, "Why would a pizza guy be saying "last call!"?
- WindTunnel EXTRA (2009–2012) – An extra 30-minute program that starts immediately after the television broadcast, available on Speed Channel web site. Despain often does a second "My Take" on a different subject. It is not unusual for a guest from the broadcast to remain for the webcast. Despain often answers questions from the live interactive chat that runs concurrent with the show.
- Dave's Favorite E-Mail (2010–2012) – Dave reads and reacts to his favorite user-submitted e-mail of the week, usually of a comedic or satirical nature.
- Help Yourself to Happiness – Sponsored by restaurant chain, Golden Corral. Dave highlights a particular moment or event of the previous week in which a racer "helps them-self to happiness." Usually features a dramatic or meaningful overtaking maneuver.
- Question of the Week - Sponsored by RACER Magazine, Dave asks viewers to respond via phone or e-mail to a particular question. Usually relates to a "Hot Topic" or to a guest of the show.
