= Mike King (radio announcer) =

American radio broadcaster

Michael Wayne King (born in Virginia) is an American radio broadcaster, who is best known for being the chief announcer of the Indianapolis Motor Speedway Radio Network and Indy Racing League between 1996 and 2013.

He began his announcing career at Campbell University, his alma mater, where he was studying to become a minister. He worked as a sports writer for several North Carolina newspapers, and worked as sports information director at Campbell University from 1981 to 1982. He started on television in Greenville, North Carolina, then took over as sports director at WTHI-TV in Terre Haute, Indiana.

In 1995, King joined the Indianapolis Motor Speedway Radio Network as a pit reporter. King took over as chief announcer of Indy Racing League events in 1996, where Bob Jenkins remained chief announcer of the Indianapolis 500. In 1999, Jenkins departed the radio network, and King was elevated to chief announcer of the Indy 500. King remained in this position until the end of 2013, when he tendered his resignation. He was replaced by Paul Page.

== Personal ==
He was a partial owner of the Terre Haute Action Track for three years, before selling it.

Preceded by Bob Jenkins	Radio voice of the Indianapolis 500; 1999–2013	Succeeded by Paul Page
