= Eileen Spain =

American physical chemist

Eileen M. Spain is an American physical chemist whose research has concerned the synthesis of thin films of semiconductors, and the characterization of material interfaces through molecular spectroscopy and atomic force microscopy techniques. After working for many years at Occidental College, she retired as Carl F. Braun Professor of Chemistry, emerita, to become a program director at the Research Corporation for Science Advancement.

== Education and career ==
Spain is originally from Sonoma County in Northern California. As a first-generation college student, Spain began her postsecondary education at Santa Rosa Junior College in Sonoma County, and transferred to Sonoma State University, where she received her bachelor's degree in chemistry. She completed her Ph.D. at the University of Utah.

She became a 1995 Cottrell Scholar of the Research Corporation, and joined the faculty of Occidental College in Los Angeles in 1995. There, she chaired the chemistry department from 2006 to 2009, and became Carl F. Braun Professor of Chemistry before retiring in 2023 to become a professor emerita. She was hired by the Research Corporation as a program director in 2023, with her initial focus there being a newly launched program to support researchers from disadvantaged groups in the transition from doctorates through postdoctoral research positions to faculty positions.

== Recognition ==
Spain was a 1997 recipient of the Presidential Early Career Award for Scientists and Engineers, given "for contributions to the synthesis of thin films essential to fabrication of reliable semiconductor materials and providing laser laboratory opportunities to high school students".
