= Larry Nuber =

Sports announcer (1948–2000)

Larry Nuber (November 29, 1948 – June 8, 2000) was an American auto racing announcer, best known for his work on ESPN broadcasts of NASCAR, CART and Formula One races in the 1980s.

== Before ESPN ==
Nuber graduated from Ohio State University and was a lieutenant in the U.S. Army from 1971 to 1974. In the late 1970s, he was an advertising account executive for WTHR Channel 13 in Indianapolis, IN. During his tenure at WTHR, Nuber met sportscaster Paul Page, which led to a career in broadcasting.

== Announcing career ==
Nuber joined the new ESPN network in 1979 for their first motor sports telecast. Nuber and Bob Jenkins called the race, a USAC event in Salem, IN.

In 1984, Nuber helped start SpeedWeek on ESPN, a weekly auto racing news program. He co-hosted the show until 1989. During his years with the network, he also announced Formula One and Thursday night "Thunder" USAC events.

At the 1985 Southern 500 at Darlington Raceway, Nuber made one of his most memorable calls when Bill Elliott won the race and became the first winner of the Winston Million.

In addition to his work with ESPN, Nuber also worked on TNN and CBS race broadcasts.

During a 1989 "Thunder" broadcast on ESPN, an on-air dispute between Nuber and fellow announcer/former racer Steve Chassey led to their dismissal from the network.

== Wynn's ==
Nuber was instrumental in bringing Wynn's sponsorship into the ASA AC Delco Series during the early 1990s while working with TNN. Before his death, he managed every aspect of the Wynn's Racing Program.

== Death ==
On June 8, 2000, Nuber was found dead at the age of 51 in his Indianapolis home by local police who received a call from family members that had not heard from him in several days. He died of a cerebral hemorrhage or stroke while working on his computer.

Instead of flowers at his funeral, it was asked that donations be made to the Rich Vogler Scholarship Fund.
