= Ken Spain (political strategist) =

American political strategist

Kenneth Paul Spain (born 1979) is an American political and communications strategist, who served as the communications director for the National Republican Congressional Committee and as the New Mexico communications director for the Bush-Cheney campaign. He co-founded the Washington D.C.–based communications firm Narrative Strategies in 2019. Spain was named the firm's CEO in 2024, following an investment from Clarion Capital Partners.

== Early life and education ==
Spain was born in Whittier, California, on March 21, 1979. He graduated from the University of California Santa Barbara with a B.A. in History in 2001.

== Career ==
Following his graduation, Spain became a District Representative for California State Senator Bob Margett. He then worked on two Texas-based campaigns including Mike Conaway’s primary campaign and Michael McCaul’s runoff campaign. In 2004, Spain served as the New Mexico Communications Director for the Bush-Cheney campaign. In 2005, he became the Deputy Chief of Staff and Communications Director for Congressman Mike Conaway (R-TX) before he left in 2006 to become the Communications Director for Congressman John Shadegg (R-AZ).

Spain left Capitol Hill in 2007 and joined the National Republican Congressional Committee where he shaped communications strategy for the campaigns of House Republicans. He served as Press Secretary and National Spokesman during the 2008 election before being promoted to Communications Director. Spain oversaw the NRCC's communications strategy during the 2010 midterm elections in which Republicans gained 63 House seats.

Spain then joined the American Investment Council (formerly known as the Private Equity Growth Capital Council) in 2011 as Vice President of Public Affairs and Communications. His time at PEGCC coincided with “unprecedented scrutiny [of] the long-secretive buyout industry,” due to Mitt Romney’s private equity background receiving attention during the 2012 presidential race. In response to the increased scrutiny of the industry, Spain oversaw the production of a video advertising series called “Private Equity at Work.” During Spain’s tenure at PEGCC, the organization’s membership grew from eight to 35 firms.

In 2015, Spain became the Managing Director of External Affairs at Koch Industries, and he was promoted to Managing Director of Corporate Communications and External Affairs in 2016.

In October 2016, Spain became a partner at D.C.-based CGCN Group, a Republican issue advocacy and strategic communications firm that represents Fortune 500 businesses He left three years later, in 2019, to start his own strategic communications firm, Narrative Strategies. In 2024, Spain was named CEO of Narrative Strategies when the firm received a majority investment from Clarion Capital Partners, a private equity firm based in New York. He was named one of PR News' Agency CEOs of the Year in 2025.

== Commentary ==
Spain serves as a commentator within the political and communications industry. He provides insight for news pieces from outlets such as The Wall Street Journal, The New York Times, Politico, Axios and the Los Angeles Times. He has also previously written commentary pieces for PRWeek, RealClearPolitics, and PR News.

== Personal life ==
In October 2009, Spain married Emily Kryder (now Emily Spain).

Spain served on the Board of the Positive Coaching Alliance, an American non-profit organization which strives to create a positive youth sports environment.
