= Bree Despain =

American author (born 1979)

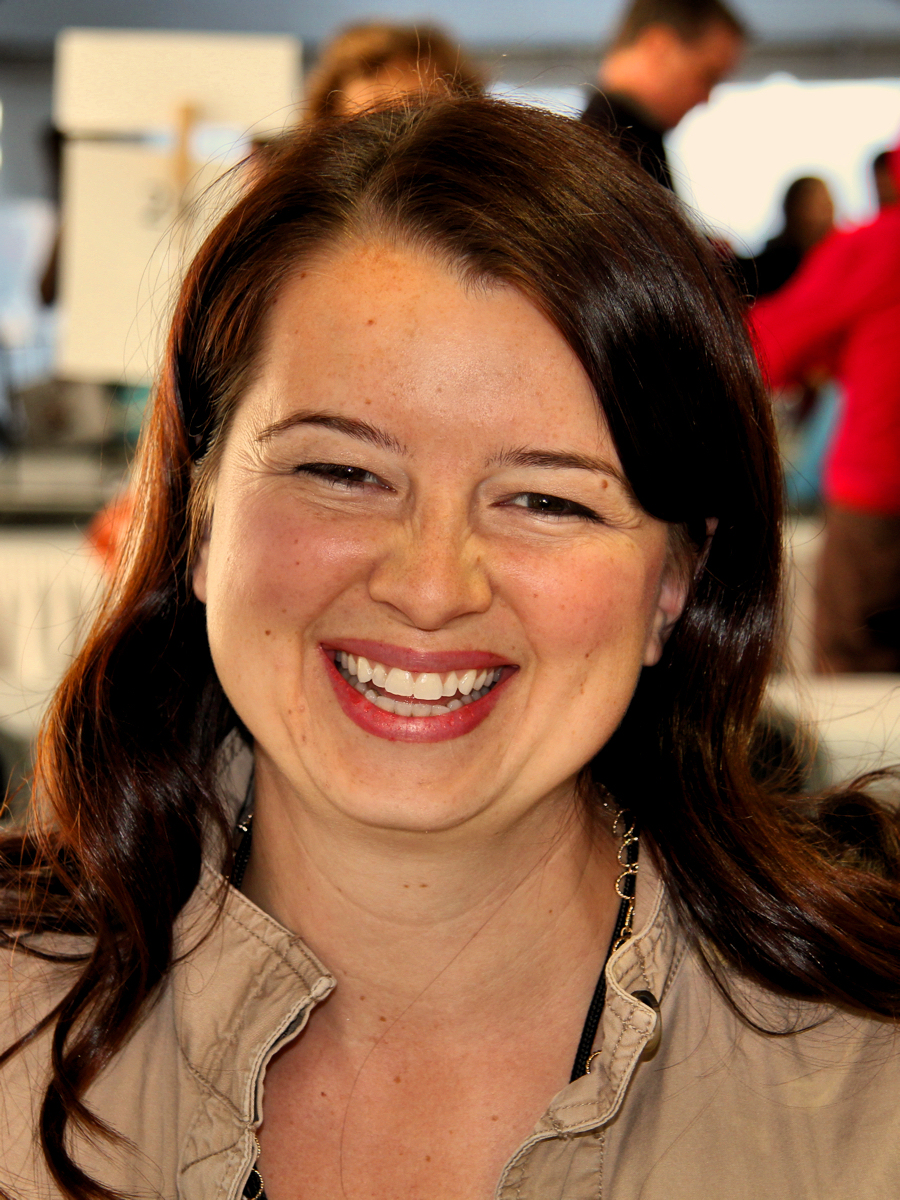
- Bree Despain at the 2012 Texas Book Festival.
- Born: 1979 (age 46–47)
- Education: Vermont College of Fine Arts
- Occupation: Novelist
- Writing career
- Genre: Young adult fiction
- Notable works: The Dark Divine, The Lost Saint, The Savage Grace, The Shadow Prince (Into the Dark: Book 1)

Bree Despain (born 1979) is an American author.

Despain received her master's degree in Writing for Children and Young Adults from Vermont College of Fine Arts. She started writing full-time after being involved in a car accident and realizing that one of her deepest regrets would have been never finishing and publishing a book.

Despain is the author of the Dark Divine trilogy and the Into The Dark trilogy. Her first novel, The Dark Divine, was published in 2009, and the second, The Lost Saint, was published in December 2010. The Dark Divine series' main character is Grace Divine, a teenage girl who is the daughter of a pastor whose life is flipped once an old childhood friend, Daniel Kalbi, returns into her life. Despain's third and final installment to the Dark Divine series, The Savage Grace, was released on March 13, 2012. Her next novel, The Shadow Prince, is the first installment of her new Into The Dark series, which is described as a modern-day retelling of the Persephone/Hades and Orpheus/Eurydice myths. The Eternity Key, book 2 in the Into The Dark trilogy released April 28, 2015, and book three was released in the fall of 2016 from Carol Rhoda Labs Press.
