= Walt Stannard =

Walt Stannard was the first pitlane commentator for live ESPN telecasts of Formula 1 races in 1987. He began his career in professional auto racing in 1976 as the Public Relations Director of Laguna Seca Raceway in Monterey, California. and retired from racing in 1998. During the intervening years, he was the executive director of the West Zakspeed Formula 1 Team, managed the Z1 Corvette team entry in the 1995 24 Hours of Le Mans endurance race for Doug Rippie Motorsports. He managed, as an executive of Campbell & Co., Ford Motorsport PR activities for NHRA, IMSA, and NASCAR teams as well as for drivers such as Dale Earnhardt, Bill Elliott, Tom Gloy, Klaus Ludwig and Bobby Rahal and worked as a journalist writing for magazines and newspapers including Competition Press & Autoweek, On Track, Race Car Engineering, and The Wheel. He got his start in racing at Sports Car Club of America (SCCA) amateur events and won an SCCA championship driving a Morris Mini Cooper S in 1969, and was a championship runner-up with a Porsche 911 in 1975. He graduated from the University of California at Berkeley with a degree in History. He has lived in England and Germany, where he was involved in the start-up of NFL Europe, as well as in California and Michigan.
