= Gary Nelson (auto racing) =

NASCAR crew chief

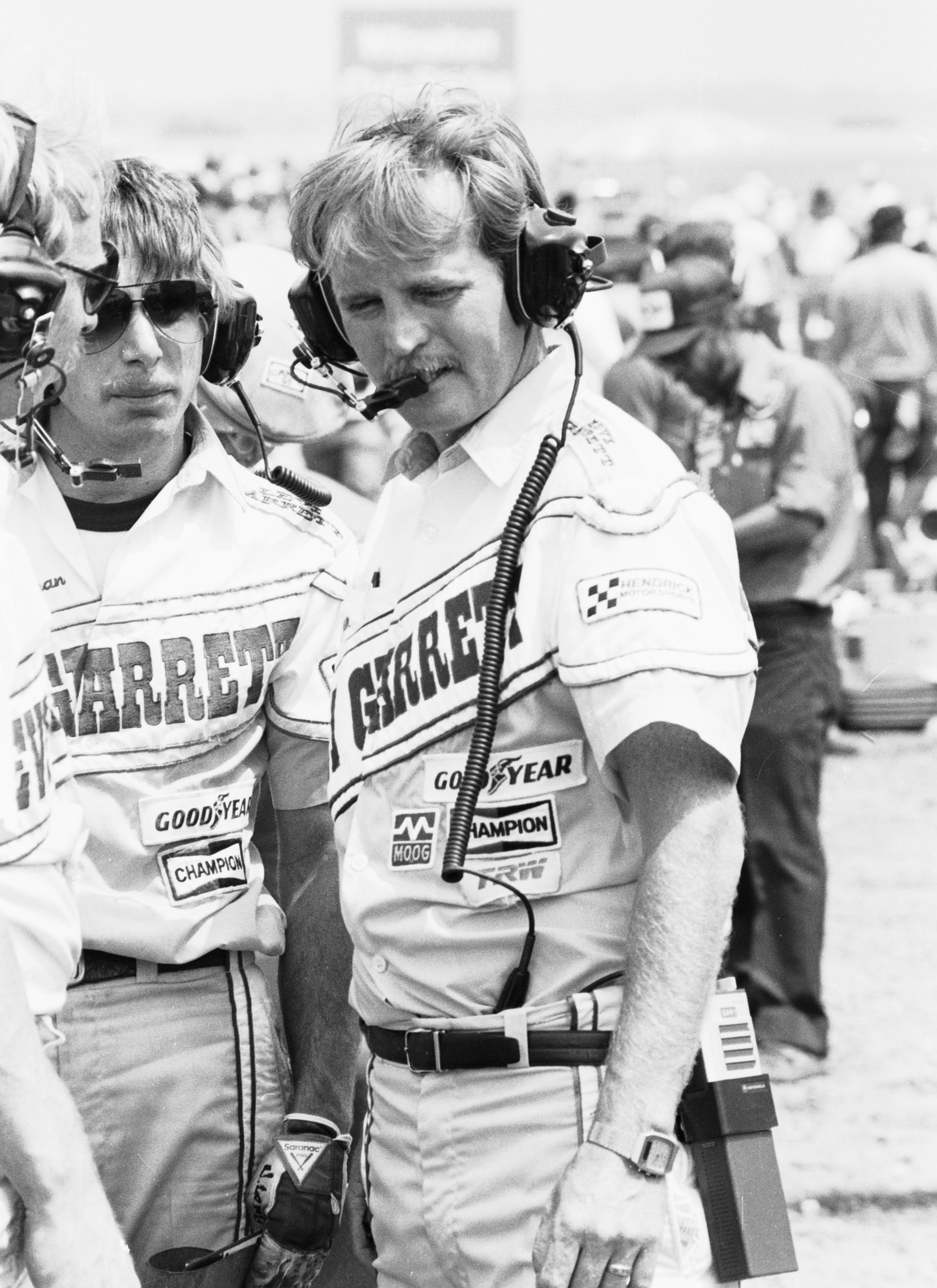
Gary Nelson in the pits in 1985

Gary Nelson (born June 5, 1953) is an auto racing manager, former crew chief and President of Coyote Cars. He was Bobby Allison's crew chief for his 1983 NASCAR Cup championship. He was inducted in the West Coast Stock Car Hall of Fame in 2006. He is the current team manager of Action Express Racing, and winner of six IMSA national Championships in nine years since 2014.

== NASCAR crew chief ==
Nelson was born in Elgin, Illinois on June 5, 1953, the sixth child and second son of Mildred Ollendorf and Arnold Nelson. Arnold moved his family to Redlands, California one year later to get out of the cold. Nelson left school after completing the 9th grade.

Nelson started in the racing business at 16 years old, cleaning up the shop for San Bernardino, California driver Ivan Baldwin. Nelson soon became Baldwin's number one asset as crew chief, engine builder and all around mechanic. Ivan Baldwin driving with Gary Nelson as crew chief became the top team for short track racing on the west coast. Baldwin and Nelson raced any time anywhere and seemed to win or crash on a regular basis from 1969 thru 1976. The pair raced NASCAR stock cars winning numerous track championships on the west coast. In 1976, Nelson took a floor sweeper job at DiGard Racing in the South East with young Darrell Waltrip, driving. The team won Waltrip's first big track race at Darlington in 1977. Nelson moved through the ranks to become DiGard's Chief Mechanic in 1978 as the team won at most NASCAR tracks from 1977 - 1979. Finishing 2nd to Richard Petty in the 1979 Winston Cup Championship. Nelson took a one-year break to help a friend start a new business, Ron Eaton, of Lakewood, Washington.

Returning to DiGard late in 1981 Nelson became crew chief for DiGard's newest driver Bobby Allison. Allison had been driving for 21 years at the time and raced for 21 different owners with no championships. The combination of Nelson and Allison proved to be strong, winning their first race, the 1982 Daytona 500. Together they won nine Winston Cup races in 1982 finishing second in points to Darrell Waltrip, who had moved to Junior Johnson's race team. Nelson and Allison came back in 1983 even stronger, winning seven Winston Cup events and the 1983 Winston Cup Championship with Waltrip finishing second. Things began to unravel between Allison and the team owners of DiGard in 1984 and 1985. Frustrated with the internal battle between Allison and DiGard Nelson built a R&D car and took it to Daytona in July 1985 to prove his ideas. Greg Sacks was offered a one race ride to drive the car. The team won what many call the biggest upset in NASCAR history by winning the 400 mile event. Instead of ending the Allison, DiGard dispute as Nelson had hoped, the Sacks victory caused even more internal conflict. When Rick Hendrick called asking Nelson to help start a second team for Hendrick Motorsports Nelson decided to take Rick up on his offer. Nelson was paired with Geoff Bodine and charged with building a complete Winston Cup race team in less than four months. The new team's first race together brought another win for Nelson, the 1986 Daytona 500. The team went on to win one more race in 1986 at Dover. Hendrick Motorsports began to struggle with many engine failures and crashes making 1987 a difficult year for all involved.

For 1988, Nelson, continued with a limited schedule at Hendrick Motorsports but never won again with Geoff Bodine. Having a few weekends off, Nelson worked part-time in 1988 for ESPN as a booth announcer alongside Bob Jenkins and Ned Jarrett. Felix Sabates hired Nelson late in 1988 to build a new team called Sabco racing. Kyle Petty became Sabco's driver. The Nelson - Petty combination began building momentum with several wins from 1989 to 1991 but a 12-week recovery from a broken leg Kyle suffered during a crash at Talladega sent the team into a tailspin. Bill France Jr. asked Nelson to become the Winston Cup Series director late in 1991. Nelson worked for NASCAR as its Winston Cup Director during its biggest growth period 1992 through 2001. NASCAR promoted Nelson to Vice President of R&D in 2001 giving him the task of building the NASCAR R&D Center in Concord, NC. The first task of the R&D Center, led by Nelson was to improve the safety of racing. NASCAR had lost ten drivers in its top three National racing series between 1991 and 2001.

Of all Nelson's success in racing, Nelson is most proud of the safety improvements. Dale Earnhardt lost his life on February 18, 2001. Since that date to the time of this writing (July 2, 2019) there has not been another life-threatening accident in any of NASCAR's National racing series. Nelson left his position at NASCAR in 2007 to form his own company, Gary Nelson & Associates. NASCAR became the first client for Gary Nelson & Associates. A motorcycle race team (Pair of Nines) hired Gary Nelson & Associates to manage their racing team. The team won several events and the 2008 Moto ST championship. Also in 2008, a Grand American road race team, Brumos Porsche, hired Nelson as consultant. The team won the 2009 Rolex 24-hour endurance race in Daytona. In 2010, Gary Nelson & Associates was hired to form a new team called Action Express Racing for new car owner Bob Johnson. Nelson took the title of Team Manager, a position he holds today. Action Express Racing, managed by Gary Nelson won its first race, the 2010 Rolex 24 event in Daytona and has gone on to win many major events and National Championships since.

Nelson was inducted into the West Coast Stock Car Racing Hall of Fame and is credited with many innovations still in use today in racing. Roof flaps, power steering, generation 5 NASCAR chassis, cowl flaps, are a few.

Nelson feels the best compliment he can receive is to be called a "Racer"

== NASCAR roles ==
Nelson was hired as a broadcaster for ESPN during the 1988 season. He was hired by NASCAR and has held several roles in the organization. He was the NASCAR NEXTEL Cup series director, Vice President of Competition, and Vice President of Research and Development.

Nelson is unmarried and father of two adult sons, William and John Nelson.
