= Despaigne =

Despaigne is a Cuban surname. People with this name include:

- Alfredo Despaigne, Cuban baseball player
- Joël Despaigne, Cuban volleyball player
- Lázaro Martínez Despaigne, Cuban sprinter
- Oreidis Despaigne, Cuban judoka
- Odrisamer Despaigne, Cuban baseball player
- Rolando Jurquin Despaigne, Cuban volleyball player
- Victoria Despaigne, Cuban heptathlete
- Yordanis Despaigne, Cuban boxer
- Yosvany Despaigne, Cuban judoka

== See also ==
- Despain
- Jean D'Espagnet
