= Eli Gold =

American sportscaster (born 1953)

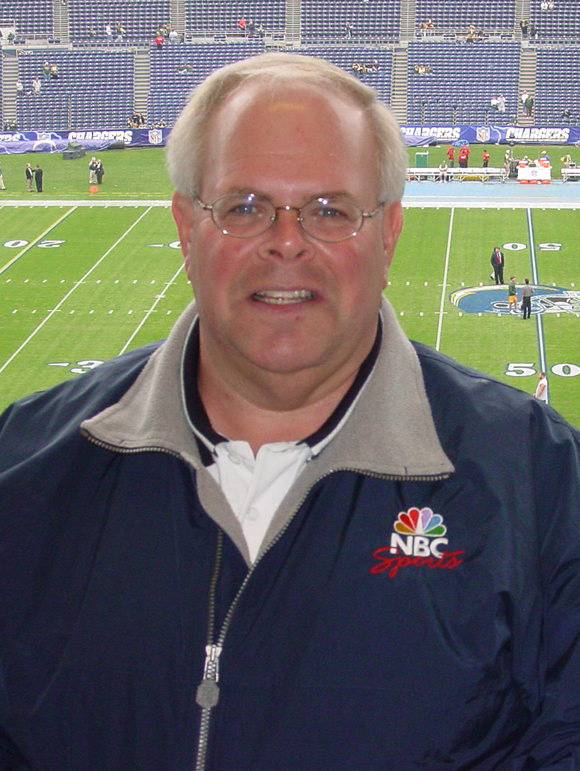
- Gold in 2006
- Born: Elias Leo Gold; December 15, 1953 (age 72); Brooklyn, New York City, U.S.
- Occupations: Radio host Author

Elias Leo Gold (born December 15, 1953) is an American sportscaster. Gold is best known as the former radio voice for the Alabama Crimson Tide football team, along with Tom Roberts, as part of the Crimson Tide Sports Network from 1988 to 2024. He also currently calls college football and NFL games for Sports USA Radio Network, and the games of the Nashville Kats of Arena Football One on local radio. Gold's former jobs include hosting NASCAR Live on the Motor Racing Network and calling play-by-play for Arena Football League's coverage on TNN and NBC.

== Biography ==
Gold was born on December 15, 1953, in Brooklyn, New York City. He began his broadcasting career in 1972 as a weekend sports reporter for the Mutual Broadcasting System.

=== Early life ===
Gold called New York home until he was twenty-three. He lost his father when he was very young; he said, "Regretfully, I didn’t know him that well." Gold says that growing up in New York impacted his broadcasting career because there were over 200 radio stations in the area. He worked at WOR and WNEW, where he learned the business.

His high school was not the usual high school that most kids go to, instead he went from 7am until 10:41am, then would go to work. In the eighth grade, he knew he wanted to be a sportscaster. He began his career in 1972 working as a weekend sports reporter with the Mutual Broadcasting System.

=== Ice hockey announcing ===
Gold's first specialty was announcing ice hockey for the Eastern, North American, Southern, American, Central, and the National Hockey Leagues. In the NHL, Gold announced games for the 1979–80 St. Louis Blues on KDNL-TV, and was the radio play-by-play announcer for the Nashville Predators during the 2006–07 NHL season. Gold made a return to pro hockey during the 2017–18 season, broadcasting games for the expansion Birmingham Bulls in the Southern Professional Hockey League.

=== NASCAR announcing ===
In 1976, Gold became a member of NASCAR's Motor Racing Network, which gives over 600 stations the broadcast of the NASCAR races. He had many different jobs with the network, including co-anchor, turn announcer, and pit reporter. His first job with MRN was working turns 1 & 2 for the 1976 World 600 at Charlotte Motor Speedway in what he described as "basically an on-the-air audition." After the race, he asked Barney Hall if he thought "they are going to bring me back." His reply was that he thought "so[.] [Y]ou did OK and I'm sure you'll be back again." While he no longer works the booth or turns, he returned to working each MRN Sprint Cup Series broadcast in the 2015 season hosting the pre-race show and post-race show.

From 1984 to 2016, Gold was host of "NASCAR Live," a weekly show that is heard all over the United States on terrestrial radio, MRN.com, and Sirius XM NASCAR Radio.

From 1996 to 2000, Gold was the lead announcer for TNN's coverage of the Winston Cup Series, sharing the booth with analysts such as Buddy Baker, Dick Berggren, Chad Little and Phil Parsons. He also worked with ESPN, CBS Sports, NBC Sports, and SETN in all of their coverage of NASCAR racing.

According to NASCAR driver Kenny Wallace, who also broadcasts NASCAR-themed shows on Speed Channel and St. Louis radio station KMOX-AM, Gold "is one of the most recognizable voices in NASCAR and in all of sports broadcasting."

In 2016, Gold resigned from MRN and all NASCAR duties. Published reports cited an incident in April of that year that was not disclosed.

=== Alabama sportscasting career ===
Beginning in the 1988 football season, Gold became the radio broadcaster for the University of Alabama Crimson Tide football and basketball teams. He hosted the shows "The Tide" and "Hey Coach," which had the coaches of both the basketball and football teams call in to talk with Gold.

Along with the Alabama Crimson Tide, Gold was called by CBS Sports to broadcast the play-by-play on a college basketball regional show, which included the universities of Georgia and South Carolina.

Gold was the first play-by-play announcer for the University of Alabama Birmingham (UAB) Blazers basketball team for six years. Gold would serve at times as the play-by-play announcer for the Blazers in the absence of Gary Sanders. He also spent four years as the broadcaster for the Birmingham Barons baseball team. While he was working with the baseball team, he was named the Southern League's Broadcaster of the Year in 1983. He was also voted Alabama Sportscaster of the Year four times by the National Sportscasters and Sportswriter Association.

Gold moved to Birmingham, Alabama to call games for the Birmingham Bulls hockey team of the World Hockey Association. He created Birmingham's first local sports call-in show, Calling All Sports on WERC, which became a staple of Birmingham sports radio for 20 years. He eventually rose to the position of sports director for what was then that market's ABC affiliate, WBRC, where he anchored evening news sports segments and hosted Sports Talk with Eli, a weekly call-in show. From 2002 to 2004 he hosted a daily sports talk show also called Calling All Sports on WJOX-AM in Birmingham.

Gold has also performed announcing duties for the Birmingham Barons AA baseball team and the UAB Blazers men's basketball team. He has been voted Alabama Sportscaster of the Year four times by the National Sportscasters and Sportswriters Association. He has also won the same honor from the Associated Press and United Press International.

On August 30, 2011, Gold returned to the daily radio airwaves as co-host of a morning drive time (6am-9am CT) sports call-in show with former Auburn quarterback Stan White on WZNN in Birmingham.

It was announced on February 21, 2024, that Gold would not be returning as the radio broadcaster for the University of Alabama for the 2024 football season.

=== Arena Football broadcasting ===
At the beginning of the 2000 season, Gold became TNN's voice of the original Arena Football League. He did the play-by-play announcing for the 3 years that the AFL was on the TNN network. When AFL moved to NBC Sports in 2003, Gold was hired to become the play-by-play announcer for the AFL. Gold also did AFL announcing for FOX Sports Net and Comcast Sports. He returned to calling arena football games for the Nashville Kats in 2024 when they were in the since-failed relaunch of the Arena Football League. (The Kats have since joined Arena Football One in 2025.)

=== NFL broadcasting ===
Beginning in the fall of 2003, Gold became a member of the SportsUSA Radio's Network coverage of the NFL. Gold handles the play-by-play for one NFL game a week. He also broadcasts all-star games and post-season college football bowl games for SportsUSA Radio.

=== NBA G-League broadcasting ===
In August 2021, Gold was announced to be the primary play-by-play voice of the Birmingham Squadron of the NBA G-League.

=== Leave of absence and health ===
On August 3, 2022, Gold confirmed he would be missing the start of the 2022 season to focus on his health. During his leave of absence, the play-by-play commentator for the Alabama Crimson Tide has been Chris Stewart, who is the current play-by-play announcer for Alabama's men's basketball.

Gold initially stated that he was not facing a serious illness and that he was merely addressing his declining ability to move around, which he attributed to orthopedic complications. Gold also reported having lost over 100 pounds. In January 2023, Gold announced he had been diagnosed with cancer, although he said that it was a "treatable" form of the disease and that he was making progress in his recovery.

=== Personal life ===
Gold currently resides in Birmingham, as well as Ocean Isle Beach, North Carolina with his wife Claudette and daughter Elise. Gold is also a part owner of Nino's Italian Restaurant, which is located in Pelham, Alabama. He also has a wing sauce named after him at Baumhowers Wings restaurant, which is owned by former Alabama defensive lineman Bob Baumhower. Gold is Jewish; he once told an interviewer that he was thrilled that a "Jewish kid from Brooklyn with zero athletic talent would make it into the Alabama Sports Hall of Fame."

== Awards ==
Gold has won the Alabama Sportscaster of the Year four times. He won these titles by being voted by the National Sportscaster and Sportswriter Association. He has also been named the Alabama Sportscaster of the Year by the Associated Press twice and also was voted the Alabama Sportscaster of the Year by the United Press International.

Gold was named the Chris Schenkel Award winner by the National Football Foundation for 2019. The award recognizes broadcasters with long careers on the air with direct ties to a specific school. Gold is entering his 31st season calling Alabama Crimson Tide football games on its radio network.

== Books ==
Gold's first book was Crimson Nation: The Shaping of the South's Most Dominant Football Team.

- Gold, Eli (2005). Crimson Nation: The Shaping of the South's Most Dominant Football Team. Nashville, TN: Thomas Nelson Publishers. ISBN 1-4016-0190-1.

Gold's second book was released in August 2007 and is called Bear's Boys. The book focuses on 36 of coach Paul "Bear" Bryant's Alabama football players and explores where they are today and how Coach Bryant's lessons impacted them in their post–University of Alabama days.

Gold's third book, From Peanuts to the Press Box, tells his life story, a boy from Brooklyn, New York who went from selling peanuts at Madison Square Garden and now works in the press boxes and radio booths of America.
