= IndyCar Series 2005 =

2004 video game

- Cover art Xbox Original
- Developer: Codemasters
- Publisher: Codemasters
- Platforms: PlayStation 2, Xbox
- Release: NA: 22 June 2004 (Xbox); EU: 25 June 2004; AU: 9 July 2004
- Genre: Racing
- Modes: Single-player, multiplayer

IndyCar Series 2005 is a racing simulator developed by Codemasters. It is the sixteenth officially licensed IndyCar video game. The game was released in 2004 for PlayStation 2 and Xbox, and is based on the 2003 IndyCar Series season.

Both the Playstation 2 and Xbox versions of the game had online multiplayer. While the original online servers were terminated, IndyCar Series 2005 is now playable online on the original Xbox with Insignia, a revival server restoring online functionality to games.

== Reception ==
Reception

Aggregate score
Aggregator	Score	
Aggregator	PS2	Xbox
Metacritic	73/100	72/100

Review scores
Publication	Score	
Publication	PS2	Xbox
Game Informer	N/A	6.5/10
GamesMaster	71%	71%
GameSpot	N/A	6.5/10
GameSpy	N/A	3/5
GameZone	N/A	8.5/10
IGN	N/A	8/10
Official Xbox Magazine (US)	N/A	6.1/10
PSM3	63%	N/A
TeamXbox	N/A	7.6/10
X-Play	N/A	3/5
The Sydney Morning Herald	N/A	3/5
The Times	4/5	4/5

The PlayStation 2 and Xbox versions received "average" reviews according to the review aggregation website Metacritic.
