= Dave Despain =

American motorsports journalist

- Born: 20 May 1946 (age 80); Fairfield, Iowa, U.S.
- Occupation: Motorsports journalist
- Known for: Host of WindTunnel with Dave Despain and NASCAR Inside Nextel Cup and Motoworld

Dave Despain (born 20 May 1946) is an American motorsports journalist. He was the host of WindTunnel with Dave Despain on Speed Channel, and NASCAR Inside Nextel Cup, until the former was cancelled during the demise of Speed and the latter underwent a format change at the beginning of the 2008 NASCAR Season. On 14 December 2013 Despain announced on Twitter that he would be moving to MAVTV in 2014 to provide color commentary during races held on the channel and host a show called The Dave Despain Show.

== Early life and career ==
A native of Fairfield, Iowa, Despain worked for a time at KMCD-AM, the local radio station. His earliest work included a program called "Dave Despain's Record-Go-Round". Eventually he worked in all phases of KMCD's programming, and became known for a unique broadcasting style in which he vigorously nodded and bobbed his head while speaking. Despain, a former motorcycle racer, later joined the American Motorcycle Association in the public-relations department. One day in the 1970s, producers of ABC's Wide World of Sports asked him to appear on camera for its coverage of a prestigious bike race at Daytona International Speedway. Despain agreed, and a new career was launched. Throughout the 1980s and 1990s, Despain was a pit reporter for both motorcycle and NASCAR races on WTBS and CBS, including the 1982 World Speedway Final at the LA Coliseum, the only time the World Final was held in the United States.

== ESPN ==
He then moved to ESPN as host of its prerace show, NASCAR 2Day. His final appearance on 12 November 2000. After that race, ESPN stopped carrying NASCAR races after being outbid for a new contract (although ESPN returned to NASCAR in 2007). Despain also hosted MotorWeek Illustrated (not to be confused with the PBS program) and MotoWorld, filled in for Bob Jenkins on SpeedWeek and hosted some programs featuring drivers walking away from spectacular crashes.

== Speedvision/Speed Channel ==
Despain joined Speed Channel in 2000 (then known as Speedvision). For some time Despain was one of several anchors of Speed News, Speed's racing newscast broadcast every weekend. In 2003, WindTunnel with Dave Despain debuted, in which Despain presided over an hour racing-centric call-in show. Wind Tunnel ran from 2003 until 2013, when it was cancelled during Speed Channel's transition to Fox Sports 1.

Despain became host of NASCAR Inside Nextel Cup in 2005, replacing the panel show's longtime host Allen Bestwick. Despain hosted the series until its cancellation in 2008, when it was replaced by This Week in NASCAR.

Dave Despain hosts a series of specials called Dave Despain On Assignment that has documented the history of the Daytona Beach course and Daytona International Speedway, and the Talladega Superspeedway. The episodes have appeared on the weekends of the Daytona 500 and the Pepsi 400, and the fall AMP Energy 500.

== MAVTV ==
On 1 December 2013 Despain announced on Twitter that he would be moving to MAVTV in 2014. His first event with the network was to be the Chili Bowl on 18 January. Despain was to provide color commentary during races held on the channel and host a show called The Dave Despain Show.
