= Bob Jenkins =

American sports announcer (1947–2021)

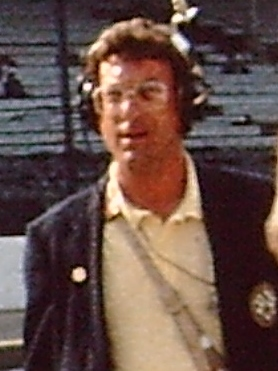
- Jenkins at the 1985 Indianapolis 500
- Born: Robert Francis Jenkins; September 4, 1947; Richmond, Indiana, U.S.
- Died: August 9, 2021 (aged 73); Indianapolis, Indiana, U.S.
- Education: Indiana University Bloomington
- Occupation: Announcer
- Known for: Calling NASCAR and IndyCar races on ABC and ESPN

Robert Francis Jenkins (September 4, 1947 – August 9, 2021) was an American television and radio sports announcer, primarily calling Indy car and NASCAR telecasts for ESPN/ABC and later Versus/NBCSN. Jenkins was the radio "Voice of the Indianapolis 500" on the IMS Radio Network from 1990 to 1998, then held the same role on ABC Sports television from 1999 to 2001.

His last position was the lead commentator for NBCSN coverage of the IndyCar Series. He retired from broadcasting after the 2012 IndyCar season finale to care for his wife Pam who was battling brain cancer. After his wife's death that offseason, Jenkins came out of retirement for occasional reserve roles on television, radio, and public address primarily at the Indianapolis Motor Speedway.

== Announcing career ==
=== Early career ===
Bob Jenkins was born in Richmond, Indiana, and grew up in the nearby town of Liberty. He graduated from Short High School in 1965 and Indiana University Bloomington in 1969. A music aficionado, Jenkins wanted to be a radio disc jockey, but instead found work as a radio news reporter. During this timeframe, Jenkins befriended Paul Page, who worked at 1070 WIBC-AM. Page helped Jenkins get his start in motorsports broadcasting, inviting him to serve as a pit reporter for Indy car races on the radio, as well as on television.

For several years, Jenkins was co-anchor for nationally syndicated farm news show, AgDay.

=== ESPN and ABC ===
Jenkins was one of the first anchors on ESPN when it debuted in 1979, working there as one of the most senior members of the network until 2003. Despite his status, he rarely, if ever, visited the Bristol, Connecticut studios. Nearly all of his work with the network was at the race track, or at satellite studios in Indianapolis or Charlotte.

His primary duty was anchoring NASCAR on ESPN from 1979 to 2000. His first booth partner was Larry Nuber. Later, he was teamed with Ned Jarrett and Benny Parsons. The trio was one of the most popular announcing crews in NASCAR. By the early 1990s, the crew (sans Jarrett, who was contracted with CBS) would also cover races on ABC Sports, including the Brickyard 400 from 1994 to 2000.

During the 1980s and 1990s, Jenkins also called Championship Auto Racing Teams (CART) Indy car races, International Motor Sports Association (IMSA), Formula One, drag racing, and various other motorsports events on ESPN and ABC. By the late 1980s, Paul Page took over as anchor for Indy car racing on ABC/ESPN, with Jenkins focusing primarily on NASCAR. Jenkins hosted the weekly racing magazine show SpeedWeek during most of his tenure at ESPN.

Concurrent to his work on ESPN & ABC, from 1979 to 1998, Jenkins worked on the IMS Radio Network. He reported various positions, including the backstretch, turn four, and served as chief announcer of the Indianapolis 500 from 1990 to 1998. In the 1990s, Jenkins also narrated the annual Indianapolis 500 official highlight films. There would be NASCAR races Jenkins would miss, the 1990 Checker 500 was due to Jenkins had the flu, Jenkins missed three races in 1994 due to a back injury he had at Indianapolis. Jenkins would miss the 1995 GM Goodwrench 400 due to a death in the family and would miss the 1997 Food City 500 as he was recovering from the back operation he had three weeks earlier. Due to IRL/NASCAR Conflicts which aired on the same network in 1999 and 2000 which Jenkins as lead announcer, he would be sent to cover IRL races.

By 1999, Jenkins quit the radio crew to focus on television full-time. The ongoing Indy Racing League/CART "Split" brought changes in the announcing crews at ESPN/ABC. In addition, ESPN/ABC lost NASCAR rights at the end of the 2000 season. Paul Page was assigned to the CART broadcasts, and Jenkins was moved exclusively to the chief announcing position of the IRL and Indianapolis 500 broadcasts. The arrangement would continue through 2001.

For 2002, with CART floundering, Page was moved back to the Indy Racing League, and Jenkins was shifted to the lesser host position. The arrangement created a "crowded" booth with two veteran announcers. In 2003, during the closing minutes of Indy 500 Bump Day coverage on ESPN, Jenkins made an impassioned commentary, defending the event from media detractors. Many were ridiculing the race and the Indy Racing League for struggling to fill the field to the traditional 33 cars.

At the end of the 2003 season, Jenkins was released from ABC/ESPN.

=== Post ABC/ESPN ===
After being released from ABC/ESPN in 2003, Jenkins joined the Indianapolis Motor Speedway staff in various roles including public address announcer and designated emcee of various events and press gatherings (such as the Victory Banquet, Last Row Party, and press conferences). The 2003 Brickyard 400 was his first foray as part of the P.A. team. In 2004, he had a short stint as an announcer for Champ Car on Spike TV but was soon fired by the production company. He joined SPEED and was an anchor for Speed News for a little over one year. Jenkins has also been a contributor to WIBC radio in Indianapolis, and the communications director for the Premier Racing Association. In 2006, Jenkins was the chief announcer of the IMS Radio Network for the U.S. Grand Prix, and in 2007, called Indy Pro Series broadcasts on ESPN2. He anchored the 2007 Brickyard 400 on the radio, his first NASCAR race call since November 2000. For 2007–2008, he returned to the IMS Radio Network for the Indy 500, reporting from the turn two position.

In 2008, Jenkins returned to the ESPN booth for two IndyCar races, the Edmonton Indy and the Gold Coast Indy 300 at Surfers Paradise. Regular play-by-play announcer Marty Reid was unable to broadcast due to scheduling conflicts.

=== Versus/NBCSN ===
In 2009, the IndyCar Series started a new television contract with Versus. Jenkins was signed as the chief announcer, and returned to Indy car racing full-time for the first time since 2001. He opted out of reprising his turn two role on the radio network, but recorded segments for air on the radio broadcast, as all three living "Voices of the 500" (Page, Jenkins, and King) participated in the broadcast. Jenkins worked for Versus in 2009 and 2010.

In 2011, Versus was bought by NBC Sports Group, becoming NBCSN. NBC inherited the IndyCar rights and hired Jenkins to continue as lead announcer for IndyCar on NBC. During the month of May, and on race day at the Indianapolis 500 (which ESPN/ABC still had the rights to), he continued his part-time work on the public address announcing team. Jenkins was involved in NBCSN's practice and qualifying coverage at Indy. In 2012, he announced he would retire at the end of the season, in part due to his wife Pam, who had terminal cancer. She died shortly after the season ended.

For 2013, he worked on the public address system for both the Indianapolis Motor Speedway and the USAC Silver Crown Series. Jenkins made a one-time return to NBCSN in a substitute role during Indy 500 Carb Day coverage, as primary announcer Leigh Diffey was covering the Monaco Grand Prix for NBC.

Jenkins, still at the Speedway for the public address system, also narrated some vignettes for NBC's NASCAR coverage on both weekday programs and race weekends.

In 2019, Jenkins and Dan Wheldon were inducted into the Indianapolis Motor Speedway Hall of Fame.

== Indianapolis 500 broadcasting duties ==
- 1979-1980: Backstretch reporter (IMS Radio Network)
- 1981-1989: Turn four reporter (IMS Radio Network)
- 1990-1998: Chief announcer (IMS Radio Network)
- 1999-2001: Chief announcer (ABC television)
- 2002-2003: Host (ABC television)
- 2004-2006: Indianapolis Motor Speedway Public Address system announcer
- 2007-2008: Turn two reporter (IMS Radio Network)
- 2009-2011: Guest analyst: (IMS Radio Network), Post-race coverage (Versus)
- 2011-2020: Indianapolis Motor Speedway Public Address system announcer (turn 4 in 2013)

== Movie credits ==
Jenkins also had three movie credits, one of which was an on-camera appearance. In order to be realistic, the race announcers in the movie Days of Thunder were the actual ESPN crew of the time, which meant Jenkins was the announcer in several voice-over scenes. While at Speed Channel in 2005, he was the Speed anchor in Talladega Nights: The Ballad of Ricky Bobby. He also did voice over work in the movie Kart Racer.

His voice was used in the EA Sports NASCAR video game series, from NASCAR 98 to NASCAR 2001, the Codemasters video games IndyCar Series and IndyCar Series 2005 as well as the Destineer video game Indianapolis 500 Evolution. He also appeared in the video game Andretti Racing on the PS1.

His most recent work can be heard in the trailer for the independent film Trifocals (March 2007).

== Personal life, illness and death ==
Jenkins was a colon cancer survivor and resided in the Indianapolis area. His wife Pam died from complications of Primary peritoneal cancer in Carmel, Indiana on October 25, 2012. Jenkins revealed on February 16, 2021, that he himself had been diagnosed with brain cancer following a suspected stroke he suffered on December 25, 2020. In the interview, Jenkins stated "I had colon cancer in 1983 and I survived that, and with God's help and my beloved race fans, I'm gonna make it." Jenkins died of brain cancer on August 9, 2021, aged 73.

Jenkins was an aficionado and collector of 1950s and 1960s music, with a collection of over 10,000 45 rpm vinyl records.

Jenkins attended every Indianapolis 500 from 1960 to 2021 - missing only twice (sixty races). He did not go in 1961; in 1965 he was instead on a high school senior trip (though he listened to the race on the radio). The 2020 race was his final race as public address announcer, one of a very small number of non-participants in attendance as the race was held behind closed doors due to the COVID-19 pandemic. His final "500" was in 2021, attending only as a spectator, less than three months before his death.

Sporting positions
Preceded by Lou Palmer	Radio voice of the Indianapolis 500; 1990–1998	Succeeded by Mike King
Preceded by Paul Page	Television voice of the Indianapolis 500; 1999–2001	Succeeded by Paul Page
