= Jerry Punch =

American auto racing and college football commentator

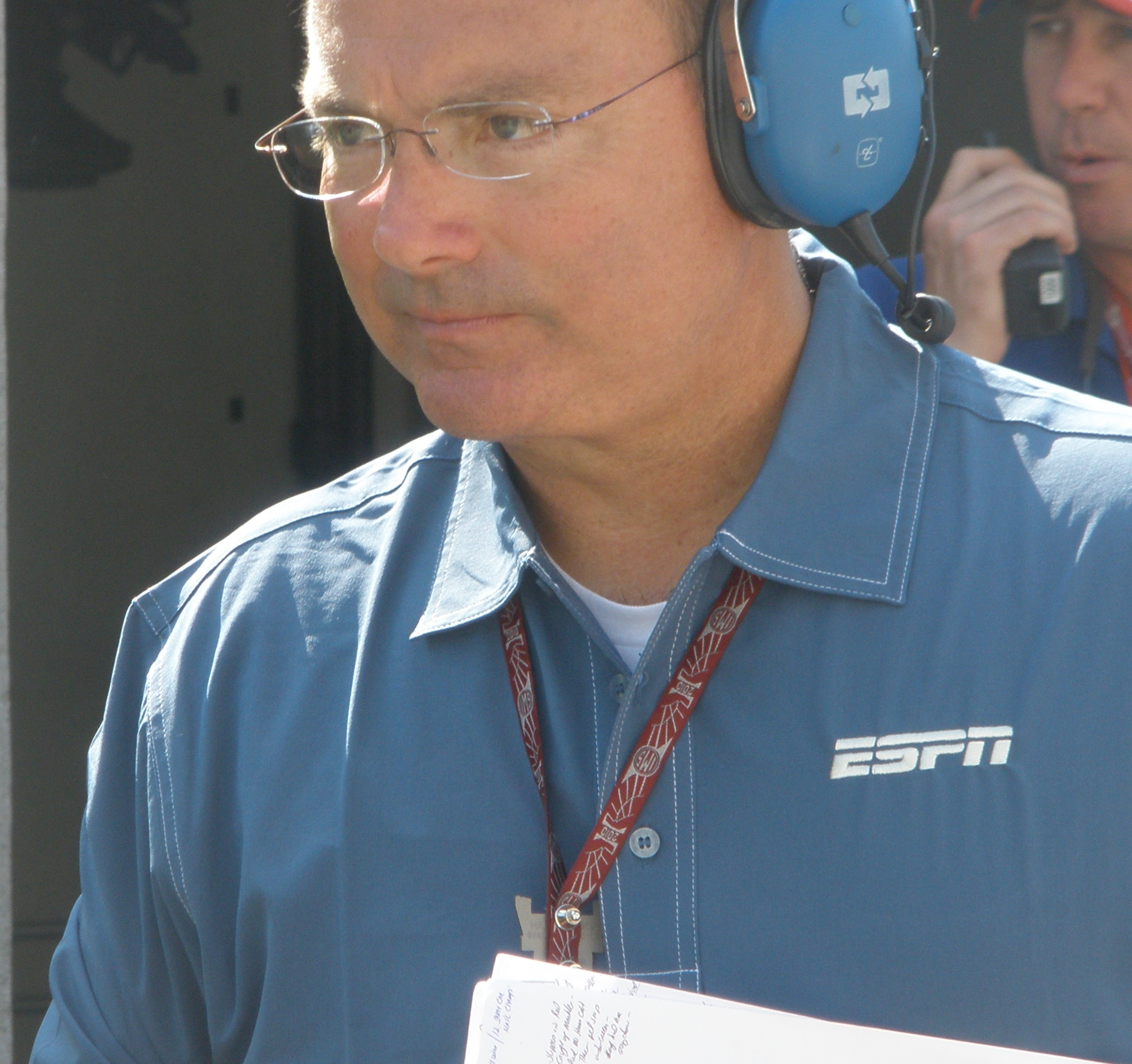
- Punch at the 2010 Indianapolis 500
- Born: August 20, 1953 (age 73); Newton, North Carolina, U.S.
- Education: North Carolina State University; Wake Forest School of Medicine
- Occupation: Sportscaster
- Spouse: Joanie
- Children: 2

Jerry Lee Punch (born August 20, 1953) is an American physician and auto racing and college football commentator known for his career at ESPN. Punch also does local radio spots in Knoxville. Punch is also a Principal Investigator for clinical research company, Alliance for Multispecialty Research or AMR, in Knoxville.

== Early life ==
Punch grew up in Newton, North Carolina. He began his broadcasting career when he was selected to join the local radio station staff of Newton-Conover High School. The local radio station, WNNC in Newton, provided free air time to the local high school broadcasting organization with rotational assignments to aspiring broadcast journalists. Students at the high school auditioned for the much sought after staff positions. Punch was successful and was selected by fellow students to become a new reporter and, thus, he was permitted to participate in the weekly Saturday morning live broadcasts on WNNC.

Punch walked-on to the North Carolina State University football team, serving as a backup quarterback under coach Lou Holtz. He graduated magna cum laude at NC State in 1975 with a degree in zoology. He received a medical degree from Wake Forest University School of Medicine in 1979. Punch paid his college and medical school tuition through prize money earned racing at short tracks in North Carolina.

Prior to his broadcasting career, Punch worked as an emergency medicine physician. He initially worked at Halifax Medical Center in Daytona Beach, Florida in 1982. He later served as the director of emergency medicine at Bunnell Community Hospital (now known as AdventHealth Palm Coast) in Palm Coast, Florida. For a period of time, Punch's medical and broadcasting careers overlapped.

== Broadcasting career ==
Punch began radio broadcasting for Motor Racing Network (MRN) in 1980. In 1984, he began working for ESPN as a pit reporter for NASCAR races. While working at ESPN, Punch also moonlighted at TBS and SETN doing pit reporting; as he was the first to report on the eventually fatal injuries to driver Terry Schoonover during the 1984 Atlanta Journal 500 for the network's race coverage.

Punch has also been a pitlane reporter for the Indianapolis 500 from 1989 to 2006 and from 2010 to 2018. He also served as the lead play-by-play voice for ESPN's coverage of the Craftsman Truck Series until the network lost that contract to Speed Channel following the 2002 season. In addition, he called play-by-play for college basketball and football, and has served as a sideline reporter for college football.

On October 12, 2006, he was named the lead lap-by-lap commentator for ESPN's coverage of the Sprint Cup Series and the Nationwide Series starting in 2007 along with Rusty Wallace and Andy Petree. Punch and Petree were joined by Dale Jarrett in 2008 and stayed together until the end of the 2009 season; ESPN replaced Punch with Marty Reid for 2010 and returned him to pit road.

In 2015, after ESPN lost broadcast rights to NASCAR, Punch returned to his previous role as a sideline reporter for college football games on ESPN, pairing up with Mike Patrick and Ed Cunningham to call selected games on the network.

Punch also has been ESPN's expert for discussion of medical issues. He was consulted as a doctor in 1996 to report the condition of Nebraska quarterback Tommie Frazier, who would go undrafted in the NFL due to a blood clot in his left leg.

On April 26, 2017, after 30 years with ESPN, Punch was let go along with 99 other network employees. He continued to be the pit road reporter until the 2017 Chevrolet Dual in Detroit, the final IndyCar race on ESPN's contract for 2017. He would later return for the 2018 IndyCar season to cover the IndyCar Grand Prix and the Indianapolis 500 as ABC aired its final year of IndyCar prior to NBC Sports acquiring the rights.

In 2019, Punch returned to college football coverage with ESPN, serving as a part-time sideline reporter for games in 2019 and 2020.

== Medical role in incidents ==
In 1988, in two separate incidents, Punch helped with the rescue efforts after the wrecks of Rusty Wallace and Don Marmor. In the case of Wallace's front-stretch crash at Bristol Motor Speedway, Punch happened to be on pit road at the time, and as a result, was the first person on the scene before the rescue crew could be scrambled. Punch's medical training proved pivotal, as Wallace was initially unconscious following the crash. Punch revived Wallace, who was able to start the following night's race with only minor injuries, driving for about half the race before giving his seat up to a relief driver. Wallace later worked with Punch in ESPN's coverage of NASCAR. In the case of the career-ending Marmor crash at Atlanta Motor Speedway, Punch (a trauma specialist) is credited with helping to save Marmor's life.

In 1989 at the Motorcraft Quality Parts 500, Punch was reporting from the pit stall of Richard Petty when a fire broke out, injuring two crew members who Punch proceeded to treat on the spot. Following the incident, ESPN mandated that its pit reporters wear fire-proof suits. Punch also had aided injured pit crew members on pit road in several races in the 1990s.

While Punch was addressing a Nashville Superspeedway media luncheon he was interrupted by a loud crash from the back of the room. Punch immediately rushed from the podium to the back of the room where Jenny Gill (daughter of singer-musician, Vince Gill), a Nashville Superspeedway intern, had fainted. Punch helped revive her, and she was taken to a local care center for observation and soon recovered, according to Sean Dozier, the Superspeedway's public relations director. Punch returned to the podium and resumed his speech.

== Personal life ==
In 2000, Punch and his wife Joanie moved to Knoxville, Tennessee to be by her family. They have a son Logan and a daughter Jessica.
