= Paul Page =

American sportscaster

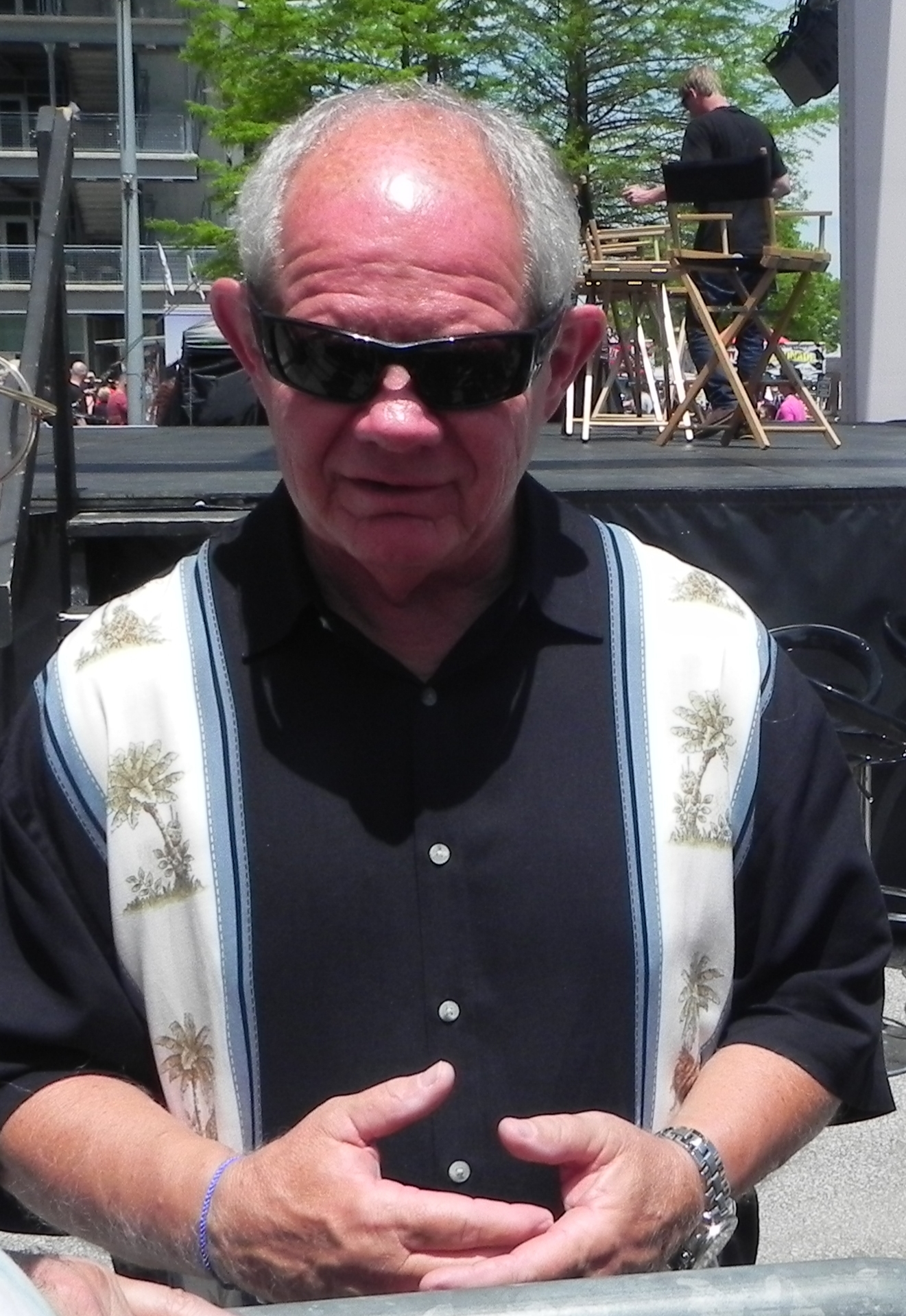
- Page at the 2014 Indianapolis 500
- Born: November 25, 1945 (age 80); Evansville, Indiana, U.S.
- Education: University of Tulsa
- Occupation: Announcer
- Spouse: Sally Larvick
- Children: 2
- Military career
- Allegiance: United States
- Branch: U.S. Army

Paul Page (born November 25, 1945) is an American motorsports broadcaster who is best known for serving as the play-by-play commentator for the Indianapolis 500 for a total of 50 years across radio and television. Page was the radio Voice of the 500 on the Indianapolis Motor Speedway Radio Network from 1977 to 1987, and again from 2014 to 2015. He served the same role on television in 1988–1998 and 2002–2004.

Page's broadcasting career started at WIBC in the late 1960s. He was the lead announcer for CART on NBC from 1979 to 1987, and then moved to ABC/ESPN's coverage of the Indianapolis 500, CART and the IRL from 1988 to 2004. From 2006 to 2012, he was the lead announcer for the NHRA on ESPN2. Page's autobiography Hello, I'm Paul Page: "It's Race Day in Indianapolis" is a popular read with history of the Indianapolis 500 and his personal connections over 50 years covering Indy.

== Biography ==
=== Early life and career ===
Paul Page was born in Evansville, Indiana, but grew up as an "army brat," moving several times, spending time in Stuttgart, Germany, Fort Belvoir, and Fort Sheridan. Page's birth father separated from his mother when he was young. His mother remarried, at which time his surname changed from Henstridge to Page, the last name of his step-father. Page went to twelve different schools from elementary to high school, and he graduated high school in Highland Park, Illinois. He is married to fellow broadcaster Sally Larvick. He studied at the University of Tulsa. He served six years in the U.S. Army. Page's son Brian is a member of Bryan Herta Autosport.

Page's broadcasting career began at WAIV and WATI, after which he moved to WIBC in Indianapolis, Indiana in 1968, where he was mentored by Sid Collins. On December 1, 1977, while doing a helicopter traffic report, Page was nearly killed in an accident, as the helicopter he was riding aboard crashed near Speedway Senior High School in Speedway, Indiana. Page suffered a compound fracture of his ankle, but soon returned to his duties.

Page's great-uncle was Harry Geisel, a Major League Baseball AL umpire. Page first attended the Indianapolis 500 in 1960.

=== IndyCar broadcasting ===
From 1974 to 1987, Page served on the Indianapolis Motor Speedway Radio Network (IMSRN). He served as a pit reporter from 1974 to 1976, and as Chief Announcer from 1977 to 1987. Page was considered the hand-picked successor to Sid Collins at the IMSRN. Page took over as chief announcer after Collins committed suicide.

Page left WIBC, and moved to NBC. He served as anchor of auto racing telecasts on NBC Sports from 1978 to 1987, covering Indy cars, NASCAR, Formula One, and the NHRA. He also worked on NBC's Sportsworld, covering a variety of sports including weightlifting, Olympics, and the America's Cup.

In the 1980s, Page was also a commentator for the motorsports show American Sports Cavalcade on the cable network TNN. While working for TNN, he covered NHRA, World of Outlaws sprint car racing, AMA supercross, monster trucks, tractor pulls, and swamp buggy racing, among others.

In the fall of 1987, Page switched to ABC Sports, and was their lead anchor for CART Indy car racing, including the Indianapolis 500. During this time, the three-man booth of Page, Bobby Unser, and Sam Posey became a fixture of the Indy 500 telecasts. Page was the brainchild behind the Delta Force intros, first introduced in 1988. The opening teases featured Alan Silvestri's score from the film The Delta Force, with a montage of Indy films, video clips, and still images, narrated by Page. The intros, also known as the "Page Teases," became a popular fixture of the ABC telecasts of the Indy 500, Brickyard 400, and other Indy car races, through 1998 and reprised again in 2001.

During his time at ABC, Page also anchored NASCAR and IROC broadcasts. Parallel to his work at ABC, Page also worked at ESPN, primarily as the anchor for CART Indy car telecasts. When the IRL was founded in 1996, he started covering those events as well. His work on the Indianapolis 500 in 1989 and 1990 help earn the Sports Emmy award for "Outstanding Live Sports Special." Other work on ABC/ESPN included AMA Supercross.

Page worked both CART and IRL events from 1996 to 1998, then for a brief time from 1999 to 2001 was shifted to CART events exclusively. He moved back to full-time covering the IRL/IndyCar for 2002 when ABC/ESPN dropped CART/Champ Car from its lineup.

Page's place on ABC's IRL/IndyCar coverage was taken by Todd Harris for the 2005 season in a move that proved unpopular. Page was reassigned to cover other events for the ESPN family of networks, most notably the X Games, NHRA, and the annual Nathan's Hot Dog Eating Contest. In 2006, Page shared announcing duties with Marty Reid for ESPN's coverage of NHRA Drag Racing, then took over NHRA full-time from 2007 to 2012.

In 2009, Page returned to the IMS Radio Network coverage of the 2009 Indianapolis 500. He joined the booth as a guest analyst. It was Page's first Indy 500 race he covered since the 2004 race. He reprised the role in 2010–2013.

In December 2013, it was announced that Page would return to the role as the radio Voice of the 500. He replaced Mike King for the 2014 and 2015 race, after King tendered his resignation. Page also called the 100th Indianapolis 500 broadcast in 2016, but handed over duties after the start to the next 'Voice of the 500', Mark Jaynes. Page has returned to the broadcast in subsequent years, sitting in the booth multiple times as a guest analyst.

==== Indianapolis 500 broadcasting duties ====
- 1974–1976: Pit reporter (IMS Radio Network)
- 1977–1987: Chief announcer (IMS Radio Network)
- 1988–1998, 2002–2004: Chief announcer (ABC television)
- 2009–2013: Guest analyst: (IMS Radio Network)
- 2014–2015: Chief announcer (IMS Radio Network)
- 2016: Co-anchor (IMS Radio Network)
- 2017, 2020, 2021, 2023: Guest analyst/commentary: (IMS Radio Network)

=== National Hot Rod Association ===
Page was one of the announcers along with former Top Fuel Dragster and Funny Car driver Mike Dunn for the NHRA Mello Yello Drag Racing Series on ESPN and ESPN2.

At the end of the 2012 season, he parted ways after nearly 25 years with ABC/ESPN. NHRA announced on February 6, 2013, that Dave Rieff, who was a pit reporter since ESPN began its NHRA coverage in 2001 and a staple of NHRA television for 17 years, would move into the anchor announcer position for the 2013 season. Former NHRA racer Mike Dunn joined Rieff in calling the action from the booth for his 12th year with ESPN as a color analyst for the NHRA Mello Yello Drag Racing Series.

=== Other events ===
Page gave the opening introduction to Papyrus's IndyCar Racing and IndyCar Racing II video games, released in 1993 and 1995 respectively. Page also was selected to be the short-phrase commentator for the Destruction Derby 2 wrecking / racing video game of 1996.

In 2001, Page narrated scenes in the film Driven, but was uncredited. In 2013, Page voiced the announcer character in the film Turbo.

Page did some work calling Snocross races at the Winter X Games in the early 2000s.

From 2005 until 2017, Page also announced the play-by-play for ESPN's coverage of the Nathan's Hot Dog Eating Contest annually on July 4.

In 2006, Page was a bull riding color commentator for the PRCA's Xtreme Bulls tour on ESPN alongside 8-time PRCA world champion bull rider Donnie Gay.

== Awards and honors ==
Page is a member of the Indianapolis Motor Speedway Hall of Fame. In 1989 and 1990, his work was awarded two Emmys for the coverage of the Indianapolis 500. He also was host / play by play in shows or series that garnered 13 other Emmys.

== Bibliography ==
- Page, Paul (6 December 2022). Hello, I'm Paul Page: "It's Race Day at Indianapolis". Octane Press. ISBN 9781642341645.

Preceded by Sid Collins	Radio voice of the Indianapolis 500; 1977–1987	Succeeded by Lou Palmer
Preceded by Jim Lampley	Television voice of the Indianapolis 500; 1988–1998	Succeeded by Bob Jenkins; 1999–2001
Preceded by Bob Jenkins; 1999–2001	Television voice of the Indianapolis 500; 2002–2004	Succeeded by Todd Harris; 2005
Preceded by Mike King	Radio voice of the Indianapolis 500; 2014–2015	Succeeded by Mark Jaynes
