= Bryan Clauson =

American racing driver (1989–2016)

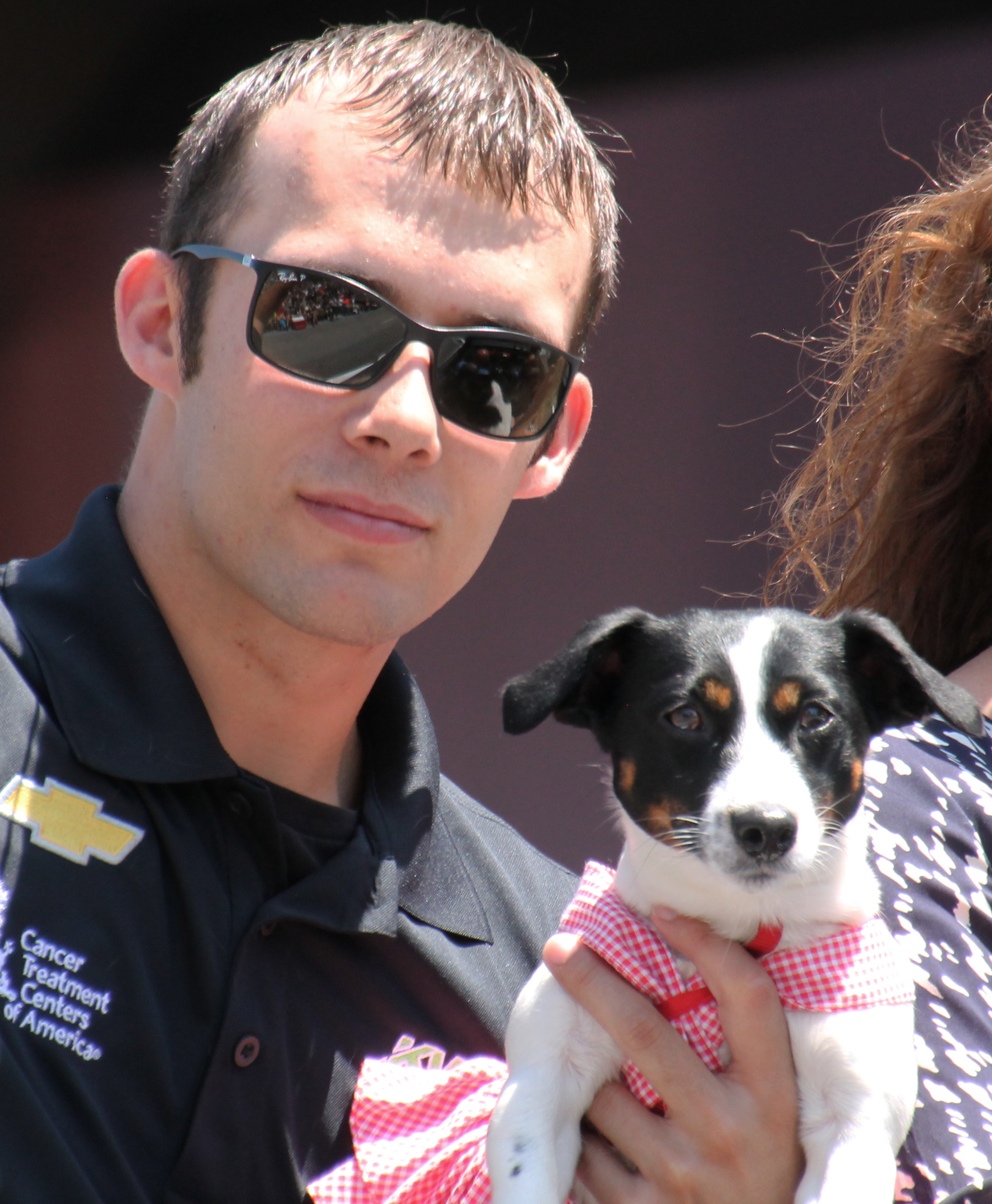
- Clauson with his dog Chevy at the 2015 Indianapolis 500
- Born: Bryan Timothy Clauson; June 15, 1989; Carmichael, California, U.S.
- Died: August 7, 2016 (aged 27); Lincoln, Nebraska, U.S.
- Achievements: 3-time USAC National Midget Series Champion (2010, 2011, 2015); 3-time USAC National Drivers Champion (2010, 2011, 2012); 2-time Turkey Night Grand Prix Winner (2009, 2010); 2-time USAC National Sprint Car Series Champion (2012, 2013); Non-winged Driver of the Year (2013); Chili Bowl winner (2014); 3 time Belleville Midget Nationals Champion (2009, 2010, 2015); Indycar Series Nation Fan Favorite driver (2016); National Sprint Car Hall of Fame (2018)

NASCAR O'Reilly Auto Parts Series career
- 26 races run over 2 years
- 2008 position: 27th
- Best finish: 27th (2008)
- First race: 2007 Emerson Radio 250 (Richmond)
- Last race: 2008 Ford 300 (Homestead)
| Wins | Top tens | Poles |
|---|---|---|
| 0 | 2 | 1 |

IndyCar Series career
- 3 races run over 3 years
- 2015 position: 39th
- Best finish: 33rd (2012)
- First race: 2012 Indianapolis 500 (Indianapolis)
- Last race: 2016 Indianapolis 500 (Indianapolis)
| Wins | Podiums | Poles |
|---|---|---|
| 0 | 0 | 0 |
- Statistics up to date as of August 8, 2016.

Bryan Timothy Clauson (June 15, 1989 – August 7, 2016) was an American professional auto racing driver, best known for his achievements in dirt track open-wheel racing, such as USAC Silver Crown, Midget and Sprint cars. Clauson was increasingly seen competing with the World of Outlaws (WoO) sprint cars in his last couple of years. Clauson also competed in the NASCAR Nationwide Series, Indy Lights, and IndyCar Series and was a development driver for Chip Ganassi Racing.

In 2016, Clauson attempted to compete in 200 races including the Indianapolis 500, World of Outlaws sprint cars, wingless sprint cars, and midget cars. On August 6, 2016, Clauson was involved in a midget car crash at Belleville High Banks Speedway in Belleville, Kansas, and died the following night.

In 2018, Clauson was elected into the National Sprint Car Hall of Fame. The facility also built the Bryan Clauson Tower with fan donations overlooking turn 2 at the famed Knoxville Raceway. The Indianapolis Motor Speedway's new infield dirt track conducts a 39-lap USAC Midget race in his memory starting in 2018.

== Racing career ==
Born in Sacramento, California, Clauson made his USAC National Sprint Series debut just two days after his sixteenth birthday on June 17, 2005, at Limaland Motorsports Park, Ohio, garnering a third place podium finish. On October 8, 2005, Clauson won the Open Wheel Oktoberfest Midget race at Columbus Motor Speedway, Ohio, becoming the youngest driver in USAC history to win a National feature event, aged 16 years, 3 months and 23 days. On August 12, 2006, Clauson recorded a historic USAC Sprint/Midget doubleheader "sweep" at Salem Speedway, Indiana, winning both the thirty-lap Midget race and 50-lap Sprint race held the same night, only the 24th such sweep in USAC history.

On August 31, Clauson scored his first career ARCA win at the Gateway International Raceway. Two months later, he began competing in the NASCAR Busch Series, driving the No. 41 Memorex Dodge Charger for Chip Ganassi. He competed full-time during the 2007 season in the USAC National Sprint and Midget Series as part of the Keith Kunz Motorsports stable.

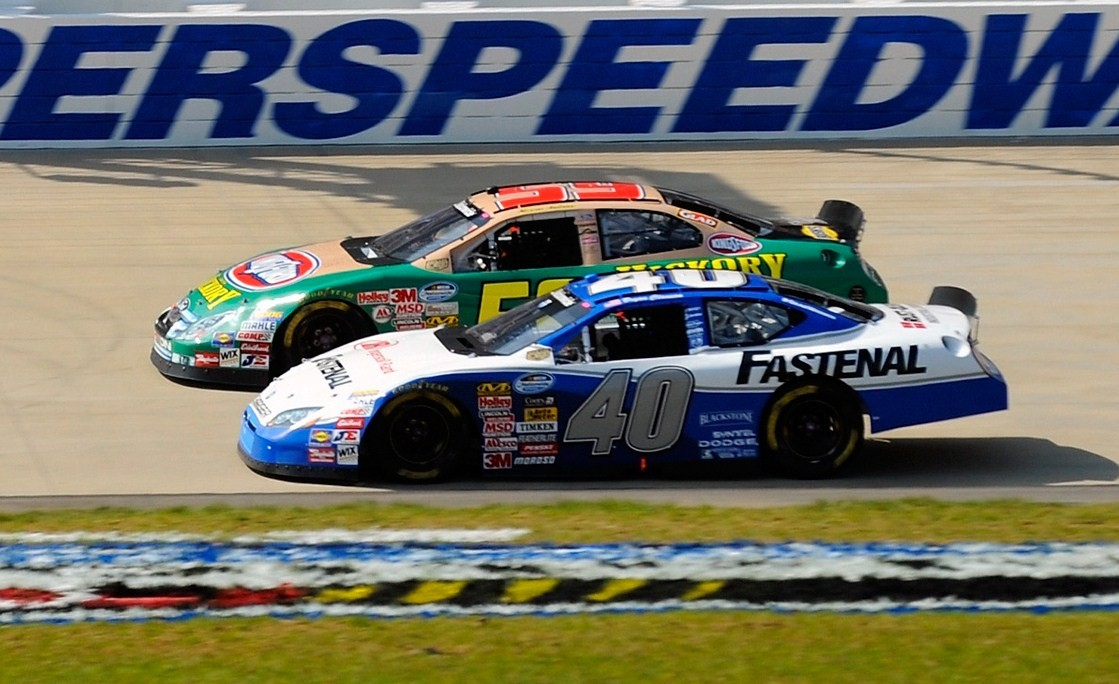
Clauson (40) racing Marcos Ambrose at Nashville in 2008

Despite his move to NASCAR, Clauson returned to his dirt-track roots on January 12, racing in the Chili Bowl, an indoor Midget race in Tulsa, Oklahoma, featuring some of the top names in racing, such as Jeff Gordon, Tony Stewart, Kasey Kahne, Jason Leffler, Gary Scelzi, Cruz Pedregon, Bobby Santos III, Brett Hearn and Tim McCreadie. After starting the feature mid-pack, he finished fourth overall.

In 2008, Clauson started the season in the No. 41 Polaroid/Texaco Havoline Dodge for Ganassi in the Nationwide Series, but was replaced by Kyle Krisiloff. He then drove the No. 40 Fastenal entry for Ganassi, filling in for Dario Franchitti in select races. He won his 1st pole at Daytona in July, but was replaced full-time by Franchitti the week after.

Clauson was set to make his Cup debut at the Bank of America 500 at Lowe's Motor Speedway driving the No. 40 Target/MotorStorm: Pacific Rift Dodge but qualifying was rained out and the team, which did not have enough owner points, did not qualify. His second attempt at his Cup Series debut ended the same way at Atlanta Motor Speedway. Qualifying was rained out for the race on October 26, 2008; he would have driven the No. 40 Guitar Hero World Tour Dodge. In his first actual attempt at Texas, Clauson failed to qualify.

Clauson was supposed to drive the No. 40 in the Nationwide Series full-time in 2009, but the team shut down after the team merged with Dale Earnhardt, Inc. and CGR's Nationwide program was shut down, The No. 40 car's sponsor, Fastenal, would also leave the team for JR Motorsports. Clauson was not able to find a ride with another NASCAR team for 2009, and he did not end up returning to the sport at all after his release from Earnhardt Ganassi, so he returned to dirt racing. He won the Turkey Night Grand Prix in November.

Clauson joined the Tony Stewart Racing Silver Crown team in USAC 2010. During this season he was successful in winning the USAC National Midget championship for his team, as well as the first-ever USAC National Drivers championship. Clauson earned a $300,000 scholarship to compete in all six Indy Lights oval races in 2011.

Clauson ran the 2012 Indianapolis 500 with Sarah Fisher Hartman Racing, but finished thirtieth with mechanical problems.

Clauson won the USAC Sprint Car Championship in 2012, and repeated in 2013.

Following the 2013 season, Clauson replaced Jerry Coons Jr. in the Joe Dooling/Rusty Kunz number 63 Westin Packaged Meats Esslinger powered Midget. On January 18, 2014, he won the Chili Bowl Nationals at the Tulsa Expo Center, while teammate Michael Pickens, driving the number 63 Dooling Machine, Esslinger powered midget, flipped with eleven to go. Later that year, the Gold Crown Nationals at Eldora Speedway were postponed after a 5-hour rain delay, the next day they resumed racing and he led all 25 laps of the race for his first Gold Crown Midget win, holding off Christopher Bell in the No. 71 KKM midget.

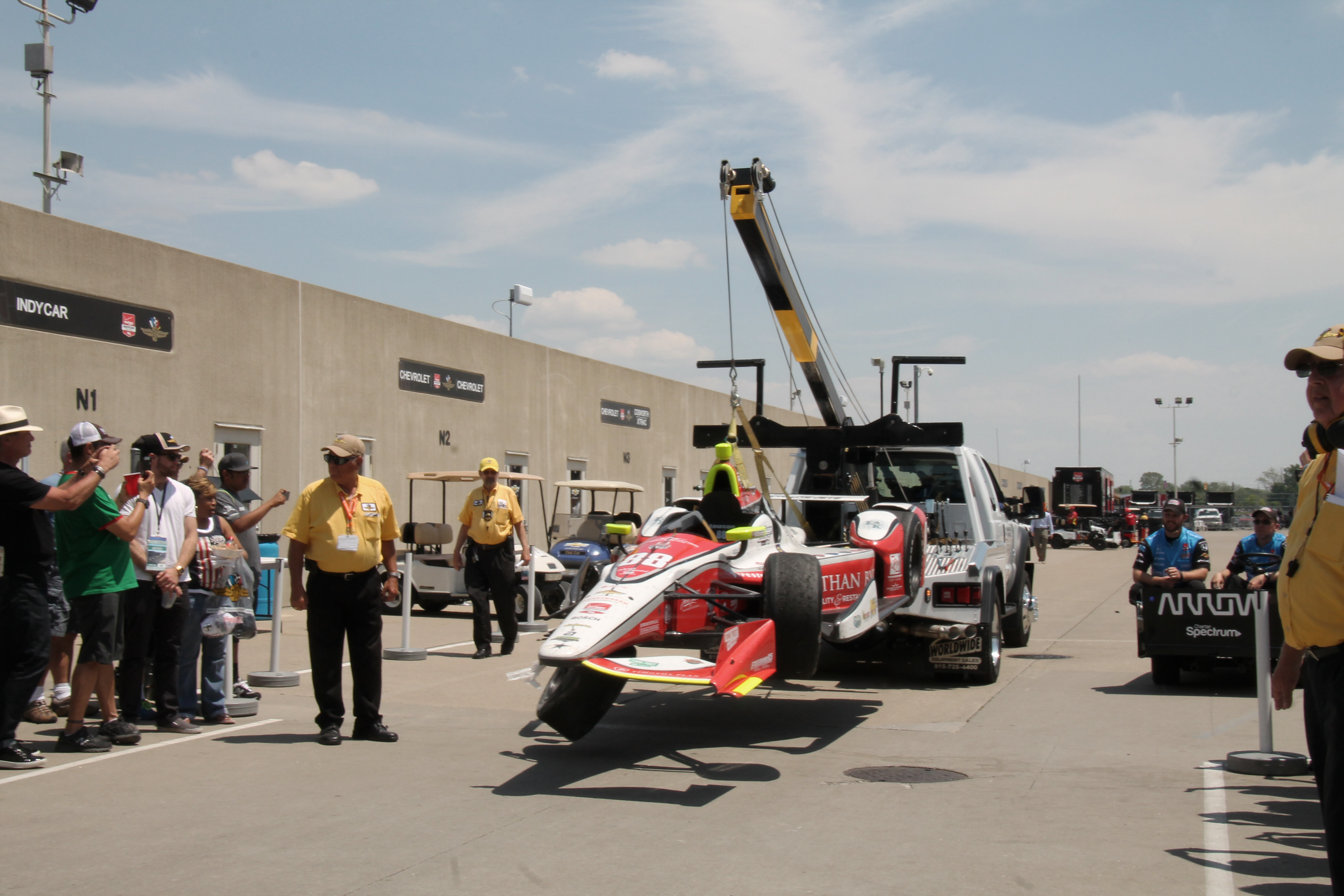
Clauson's damaged car returning to the garage, at the 2015 Indianapolis 500

Clauson returned to the Indy 500 in 2015, driving for the KV Racing Technology/Jonathan Byrd's Racing team, finishing 31st after an accident while moving out of the way for a faster car. He also competed in the "Kokomo Classic" at Kokomo Speedway later that evening, where he finished 2nd to Kevin Thomas Jr. in a photo finish.

Clauson was attempting to compete in two-hundred races in 2016 which is being billed as "The Chasing 200 Tour, Circular Insanity". The tour included the 100th Indianapolis 500, USAC Midget and Sprint cars, World of Outlaws (WoO) sprint cars, and wingless sprint cars. He normally ran about 150 shows per year; he hoped to double up by racing some 360 wingless sprint car class cars at 410 (WoO / USAC) winged sprint car events. Clauson traveled the country living out of a mobile home. The IndyCar Series announced during its series banquet on October 4, 2016, that Clauson was named INDYCAR Nation Fan Favorite driver as voted on by the fans.

== Death ==
On August 6, 2016, Clauson was competing in the Belleville Nationals midget race at Belleville High Banks – his 116th race of the year – when he was involved in an accident in which he flipped his car after making contact with a lapped car and was hit by another. He was taken to Bryan Medical Center West and was in critical condition upon arrival. Clauson died at the hospital the following evening.

Tony Stewart remarked, "It sucks when it's anybody in racing. It's hard when you lose them, but it's even worse when they're somebody as close to you as Bryan was. I feel for Bryan's parents and his sister, and I hope to be able to see them soon, but just thinking about them more than anything right now."

Clauson was a registered organ donor, which contributed to five lives being saved. Shortly after his death, Clauson's parents established an organ donation registration campaign. Named 'Chasing 200,' by the time of Clauson's memorial service on August 24, more than 750 people had registered, after which the campaign expanded its goal to 2000 registrants. A month after Clauson's passing, more than 3750 people had registered, making it one of the largest donation campaigns in recorded history; at that time, it was believed their future donations would contribute to saving an estimated 18,800 lives.

Various tributes from the racing community were made in honor of Clauson. For the Xfinity Series race at Mid-Ohio Sports Car Course, drivers ran a BC decal on the A-post of their cars, while race winner Justin Marks dedicated his victory to Clauson. The following week, at the Cup Series' Bass Pro Shops NRA Night Race, Ricky Stenhouse Jr. ran a Fastenal scheme modeled after Clauson's 2008 Nationwide Series car, Stenhouse finished in a then career-best 2nd place. And on May 28, 2017, at the 100 lap of the Indianapolis 500 race, the video board located at the start-finish line displayed a commemorative green image with the legend #BCFOREVER on it.

=== Legacy ===
The Bryan Clauson Classic, known as the Driven2SaveLives BC39 presented by NOS Energy for commercial reasons, is held during the NASCAR meeting at the Indianapolis Motor Speedway. This event promotes organ donation through registration, and carries his car number, 39, as the race distance. It is a two-night United States Auto Club NOS Midget Championship race. Originally run for the 25th Brickyard 400, the event was moved to the week after the NASCAR meeting in 2021 in order to avoid a date clash with the Knoxville Nationals. The race is now a September race.

In 2018, Clauson was elected on the first ballot into the National Sprint Car Hall of Fame.

On May 19, 2021, the NTT IndyCar Series announced that the driver who qualifies on pole for the inaugural Big Machine Music City Grand Prix in Nashville, Tennessee, would receive the Bryan Clauson Trophy, awarded to highlight the event's partnership with Tennessee Donor Services to raise awareness for organ and tissue donation. The race sponsor, Big Machine Label Group, was Clauson's sponsor.

== Personal life ==
Clauson attended Noblesville High School in Noblesville, Indiana. He is survived by his parents Tim and Diana Clauson and sister Taylor. He left behind his fiancée Lauren Stewart and their dogs, Chevy and Stewart.

== Racing record ==
=== American open-wheel racing results ===
(key)

==== Indy Lights ====
| Year | Team | 1 | 2 | 3 | 4 | 5 | 6 | 7 | 8 | 9 | 10 | 11 | 12 | 13 | 14 | Rank | Points |
|---|---|---|---|---|---|---|---|---|---|---|---|---|---|---|---|---|---|
| 2011 | Sam Schmidt Motorsports | STP | ALA | LBH | **INDY**; 5 | MIL; 4 | IOW; 3 | TOR | EDM1 | EDM2 | TRO | NHM; 7 | BAL | KTY; 5 | LVS; 13 | 12th | 170 |
| 2012 | Fan Force United | STP | ALA | LBH | INDY | DET | MIL; 10 | IOW; 10 | TOR | EDM | TRO | BAL | FON | | | 18th | 40 |

==== IndyCar Series ====
| Year | Team | No. | Chassis | Engine | 1 | 2 | 3 | 4 | 5 | 6 | 7 | 8 | 9 | 10 | 11 | 12 | 13 | 14 | 15 | 16 | Rank | Points | Ref |
|---|---|---|---|---|---|---|---|---|---|---|---|---|---|---|---|---|---|---|---|---|---|---|---|
| 2012 | Sarah Fisher Hartman Racing | 39 | Dallara DW12 | Honda | STP | ALA | LBH | SAO | INDY; 30 | DET | TXS | MIL | IOW | TOR | EDM | MOH | SNM | BAL | FON | | 33rd | 13 | |
| 2015 | Jonathan Byrd's Racing | 88 | Dallara DW12 | Chevrolet | STP | NLA | LBH | ALA | IMS | INDY; 31 | DET | DET | TXS | TOR | FON | MIL | IOW | MOH | POC | SNM | 39th | 10 | |
| 2016 | Jonathan Byrd's Racing | 88 | Dallara DW12 | Honda | STP | PHX | LBH | ALA | IMS | INDY; 23 | DET | DET | RDA | IOW | TOR | MOH | POC | TXS | WGL | SNM | 33rd | 21 | |

==== Indianapolis 500 ====
| Year | Chassis | Engine | Start | Finish | Team |
|---|---|---|---|---|---|
| 2012 | Dallara | Honda | 31 | 30 | Sarah Fisher Hartman Racing |
| 2015 | Dallara | Chevrolet | 33 | 31 | Jonathan Byrd's Racing |
| 2016 | Dallara | Honda | 28 | 23 | Dale Coyne Racing / Jonathan Byrd's Racing |

=== NASCAR ===
(key) (Bold – Pole position awarded by qualifying time. Italics – Pole position earned by points standings or practice time. * – Most laps led.)

==== Sprint Cup Series ====
NASCAR Sprint Cup Series results
| Year | Team | No. | Make | 1 | 2 | 3 | 4 | 5 | 6 | 7 | 8 | 9 | 10 | 11 | 12 | 13 | 14 | 15 | 16 | 17 | 18 | 19 | 20 | 21 | 22 | 23 | 24 | 25 | 26 | 27 | 28 | 29 | 30 | 31 | 32 | 33 | 34 | 35 | 36 | NSCC | Pts | Ref |
|---|---|---|---|---|---|---|---|---|---|---|---|---|---|---|---|---|---|---|---|---|---|---|---|---|---|---|---|---|---|---|---|---|---|---|---|---|---|---|---|---|---|---|
| 2008 | Chip Ganassi Racing | 40 | Dodge | DAY | CAL | LVS | ATL | BRI | MAR | TEX | PHO | TAL | RCH | DAR | CLT | DOV | POC | MCH | SON | NHA | DAY | CHI | IND | POC | GLN | MCH | BRI | CAL | RCH | NHA | DOV | KAN | TAL | CLT; DNQ | MAR | ATL; DNQ | TEX; DNQ | PHO | HOM | N/A | 0 | |

==== Nationwide Series ====
NASCAR Nationwide Series results
| Year | Team | No. | Make | 1 | 2 | 3 | 4 | 5 | 6 | 7 | 8 | 9 | 10 | 11 | 12 | 13 | 14 | 15 | 16 | 17 | 18 | 19 | 20 | 21 | 22 | 23 | 24 | 25 | 26 | 27 | 28 | 29 | 30 | 31 | 32 | 33 | 34 | 35 | NNSC | Pts | Ref |
|---|---|---|---|---|---|---|---|---|---|---|---|---|---|---|---|---|---|---|---|---|---|---|---|---|---|---|---|---|---|---|---|---|---|---|---|---|---|---|---|---|---|
| 2007 | Chip Ganassi Racing | 41 | Dodge | DAY | CAL | MXC | LVS | ATL | BRI | NSH | TEX | PHO | TAL | RCH | DAR | CLT | DOV | NSH | KEN | MLW | NHA | DAY | CHI | GTY | IRP | CGV | GLN | MCH | BRI | CAL | RCH; 35 | DOV | KAN; 23 | CLT; 20 | MEM; 18 | TEX; 28 | PHO | HOM | 76th | 443 | |
| 2008 | Chip Ganassi Racing | 41 | Dodge | DAY; 6 | CAL; 34 | LVS | ATL; 29 | BRI; 35 | | | | | | | | | | | | | | | | | | | | | | | | | | | | | | | 27th | 1915 | |
| 2008 | Chip Ganassi Racing | 40 | Dodge | | | | | | NSH; 17 | TEX | PHO | MXC | TAL | RCH; 21 | DAR; 18 | CLT; 31 | | NSH; 22 | KEN; 5 | MLW; 20 | NHA | **DAY**; 19 | CHI | GTY | IRP; 32 | CGV | GLN | MCH | BRI | CAL; 18 | RCH; 38 | DOV; 33 | KAN; 21 | CLT | MEM | TEX | PHO; 16 | HOM; 34 | 27th | 1915 | |
| 2008 | MacDonald Motorsports | 81 | Dodge | | | | | | | | | | | | | | DOV; 31 | | | | | | | | | | | | | | | | | | | | | | 27th | 1915 | |

=== ARCA Re/Max Series ===
(key) (Bold – Pole position awarded by qualifying time. Italics – Pole position earned by points standings or practice time. * – Most laps led.)

ARCA Re/Max Series results
| Year | Team | No. | Make | 1 | 2 | 3 | 4 | 5 | 6 | 7 | 8 | 9 | 10 | 11 | 12 | 13 | 14 | 15 | 16 | 17 | 18 | 19 | 20 | 21 | 22 | 23 | ARSC | Pts | Ref |
|---|---|---|---|---|---|---|---|---|---|---|---|---|---|---|---|---|---|---|---|---|---|---|---|---|---|---|---|---|---|
| 2007 | Chip Ganassi Racing | 40 | Dodge | DAY | USA; 2 | NSH | SLM | KAN | WIN | KEN | TOL | | | | | KEN; 14 | POC | NSH; 2 | ISF | MIL | GTW; 1 | DSF | CHI | SLM | **TAL**; 11 | TOL | 32nd | 1245 | |
| 2007 | Cunningham Motorsports | 4 | Dodge | | | | | | | | | IOW; 5 | POC | MCH | BLN | | | | | | | | | | | | 32nd | 1245 | |

=== Sprint Car & Midget Racing ===
==== Chili Bowl Results ====
| | | | Prelim Night | | | | Championship Night | |
| Year | Team | Car # | Heat Start | Heat Finish | Feature Start | Feature Finish | Feature Start | Feature Finish |
|---|---|---|---|---|---|---|---|---|
| 2011 | | 39C | | 1 | | 1 | 1 | 5 |
| 2012 | | 39C | | 2 | 1 | 3 | 11 | 5 |
| 2013 | | 39B | 8 | 3 | 13 | 7 | 20 | 8 |
| 2014 | | 63 | 3 | 1 | 2 | 1 | 3 | 1 |
| 2015 | | 63 | 5 | 1 | 1 | 1 | 2 | 10 |
| 2016 | | 63 | 6 | 1 | 1 | 1 | 1 | 2 |
