= 2012 Indianapolis 500 =

American motor race

96th Indianapolis 500

Indianapolis Motor Speedway

Indianapolis 500
- Sanctioning body: IndyCar
- Season: 2012 IndyCar season
- Date: May 27, 2012
- Winner: (United Kingdom) Dario Franchitti
- Winning team: Chip Ganassi Racing
- Winning Chief Mechanic: Kevin O'Donnell
- Time of race: 2:58:51.2532
- Average speed: 167.734 mph (269.942 km/h)
- Pole position: (Australia) Ryan Briscoe
- Pole speed: 226.484 mph (364.491 km/h)
- Fastest qualifier: (Australia) Ryan Briscoe
- Rookie of the Year: (Brazil) Rubens Barrichello
- Most laps led: (United States) Marco Andretti (59)

Pre-race ceremonies
- National anthem: Martina McBride
- "Back Home Again in Indiana": Jim Nabors (video)
- Starting command: Mari Hulman George
- Pace car: Chevrolet Corvette ZR1
- Pace car driver: Guy Fieri
- Two-seater: Mario Andretti (driver); Thomas Patton (passenger)
- Starter: Paul Blevin
- Honorary starter: Indiana Governor Mitch Daniels
- Estimated attendance: 300,000+ (est.)

Television in the United States
- Network: ABC
- Announcers: Marty Reid, Scott Goodyear, and Eddie Cheever
- Nielsen ratings: 4.34

Chronology
Previous	Next
2011	2013

The 96th Indianapolis 500 was held at the Indianapolis Motor Speedway in Speedway, Indiana, on Sunday May 27, 2012. It was the premier event of the 2012 IZOD IndyCar Series season. For the first time since 1996 all entries featured turbocharged engines, and all entries were brand new model-year chassis, as part of the ICONIC Project. This was the first time since 2003, and only the fourth time since 1985, that all cars were a new model-year chassis.

The track opened for practice on Saturday May 12. Time trials were held May 19–20. Ryan Briscoe of Penske Racing qualified for the pole position. The final practice, traditionally dubbed "Carb Day", was held Friday May 25.

Dario Franchitti, who previously won the race in 2007 and 2010, won the event, becoming a three-time Indy 500 champion. On the final lap, second place Takuma Sato challenged Franchitti for the lead in turn one, but Franchitti maintained a low line, forcing Sato's left tires on or over the white line marking the edge of the course. As the two cars were side by side, Sato spun and crashed into the outside wall. Sato finished in 17th, while Franchitti went on to take the victory. Dario Franchitti's teammate Scott Dixon finished second, sweeping a 1st–2nd finish for Chip Ganassi Racing. The race set an all-time record with 34 lead changes. This was the final Indy car win of Franchitti's twelve-season career. In the penultimate race of the 2013 season at Houston, Franchitti would be involved in a multi-car accident that would prematurely end his career.

== Event background ==
Indianapolis Motor Speedway, the race track where the race was held.

For the first time since 1947, the previous year's race winner had been killed in a racing crash in the time between races. Defending race winner Dan Wheldon was killed in a horrific crash during the 2011 season finale, the 2011 IZOD IndyCar World Championship at Las Vegas Motor Speedway. Several winners have missed the following year due to either retirements, injuries, or racing in a different series. The last time the defending champion did not participate in the race due to injury or death was 2004 race winner Buddy Rice, who suffered a concussion during practice, and sat out the 2005 race (also won by Wheldon). The last time a defending Indianapolis 500 champion did not participate in the race under any circumstances was 2007 race winner Dario Franchitti, who was injured in a NASCAR Nationwide Series race at Talladega Superspeedway in April 2008 and had a full-time racing schedule in the NASCAR Sprint Cup Series in 2008.

Jim Nabors, who has traditionally sung "Back Home Again in Indiana" during the pre-race ceremonies in most years since 1972, was not able to attend the race for health reasons. The Speedway sent a film crew to record a video of him performing the song at his home in Hawaii, and aired it on video boards on race morning.

Going into the month, there was growing concern about filling the field to the traditional 33 cars. This was due in part to the struggles of Lotus, and lease issues in the first year of the new engine package, namely involving Dragon Racing. However, on Bump Day, the field was filled to exactly 33 cars, with no cars bumped, a similar situation to 2003.

=== Rule changes ===
- Due to safety concerns, IndyCar officials announced in the 2012 State of IndyCar address that restarts would revert to single-file for the two ovals whose distance is at least two miles or greater. This eliminated the double-file restarts used at Indy in 2011 only.
- The overtake assist system ("Push-to-pass") was eliminated for the Indianapolis 500 and other oval races.
- The race will start after four warm up laps (3 parade laps and 1 pace lap), up from three warm up laps used from 1977 to 2011. During the first parade lap, the field is required to stay aligned in the traditional eleven rows of three. During the second and third laps, the cars are allowed to break single file in order to warm up their tires. During the final pace lap, the field must reassemble into the rows of three for the start.
- At the start and on restarts, cars may pass as soon as the green flag/light is displayed. Previously, cars could not pass until crossing the start/finish line.
- If there is a caution period during the final 20 laps, all lapped cars will be placed at the end of the line for the subsequent restart.

== Schedule ==
Race schedule — May 2012
Sun	Mon	Tue	Wed	Thu	Fri	Sat
29; São Paulo	30	1	2	3	4	5 Mini-Marathon
6	7 Oval test	8	9	10; ROP	11; Indy Lights	12; Practice
13; Practice	14; Practice	15; Practice	16; Practice	17; Practice	18; Practice	19; Pole Day
20; Bump Day	21	22	23; Comm. Day	24; Indy Lights	25; Carb Day	26; Legends Day
27; Indy 500	28; Memorial Day	29	30	31		

Color	Notes
Green	Practice
Dark Blue	Time trials
Silver	Race day
Red	Rained out*
Blank	No track activity

* Includes days where track activity
was significantly limited due to rain

ROP — denotes Rookie Orientation Program

Comm. Day — denotes 500 Festival Community Day

Other scheduled events included:

- May 11 – Freedom 100 testing
- May 12–13 – Second Annual Celebration of Automobiles / Emerging Technologies Day
- May 24 – Freedom 100 practice and time trials
- May 25 – Freedom 100 race, Carb Day concert featuring Lynyrd Skynyrd
- May 26 – Legends Day featuring Roger Penske: Public Drivers Meeting, Autograph sessions

== Entry list ==
See Team and driver chart for more information

On April 18, 2012, the official entry list of thirty-four car/driver combinations was released. Former winners entered include Dario Franchitti, Hélio Castroneves and Scott Dixon. In an unusual move, Chip Ganassi Racing sponsor Target changed Franchitti's car number for the month. While Franchitti was legally entitled to using #1, the team decided instead to keep the team's #10 identity for the season, but to celebrate Target's fifty years in business, the car carried #50 for the race. The stylised #50 utilised the Target logo.

Former Formula One driver Jean Alesi was listed as an entry for Newman Haas Racing, but the car was later withdrawn. Lotus continued to find a team for Alesi, and struck a deal with Indy Lights team Fan Force United to run a car. Rubens Barrichello, winner of the 2002 U.S. Grand Prix at Indy was the first former winner of that event to attempt to qualify for the Indy 500.

Michel Jourdain Jr., who had last raced at Indy sixteen years earlier in 1996, was named to Rahal Letterman Lanigan Racing. Jourdain would be the only driver in the field from the 1990s. With John Andretti not entered, not a single driver from the 1980s was in the field.

== Testing and rookie orientation ==
With the introduction of the new chassis and engine package, testing was conducted at the Indianapolis Motor Speedway during the offseason. The first phase of testing involved Dan Wheldon, and testing was conducted on the USGP road course at Indianapolis on September 1, and on the oval in late September. Dario Franchitti and Tony Kanaan tested at Indianapolis in early November for Honda and Chevrolet. Test results were mixed at the Speedway, with drivers complaining of weight imbalance issues, and speeds (208–216 mph) were down from what was expected.

=== Open test — Wednesday, April 4 ===
- Weather: 64 °F (18 °C), partly cloudy
- Practice summary: An open test was held for veteran drivers only. Multi-car teams were allowed only one car/driver combination for the test, rookies were not allowed, and Lotus did not participate. The cars were fitted with new rear wheel guards, designed to correct aerodynamic issues experienced during previous tests. Nine drivers took part in the test. Tony Kanaan, Marco Andretti, Hélio Castroneves, Ed Carpenter, and J. R. Hildebrand test for Chevrolet. Scott Dixon, Takuma Sato, Mike Conway, and Justin Wilson tested for Honda. The nine drivers completed 495 laps, with no incidents reported.

Top Practice Speeds
Pos	No.	Driver	Team	Engine	Speed
1	26	(United States) Marco Andretti	Andretti Autosport	Chevrolet	218.625
2	11	(Brazil) Tony Kanaan	KV Racing Technology	Chevrolet	218.439
3	10	(New Zealand) Scott Dixon	Chip Ganassi Racing	Honda	218.094
OFFICIAL REPORT

=== Texas Motor Speedway Test — Monday, May 7 ===
For the second year in a row, IndyCar held an official pre-Indy oval test. Since the Indy 500 will be the first oval race of the 2012 season, the league hosted a test for rookies to assimilate with ovals, and to test out an updated aero kit package for Texas Motor Speedway, a 1.5-mile 24-degree banked oval which has been a type of circuit that was questionable in light of the Las Vegas tragedy. The aero kit package at Texas was not used for Indianapolis or Fontana. Indianapolis and Fontana, home of the 2012 IZOD IndyCar World Championship, used the same superspeedway aero and rules package. The test also saw Rubens Barrichello take his first competitive laps on an oval on Monday May 7.

Top Practice Speeds
Pos	No.	Driver	Team	Engine	Speed
1	9	(New Zealand) Scott Dixon	Chip Ganassi Racing	Honda	212.371
2	83	(United States) Charlie Kimball	Chip Ganassi Racing	Honda	211.330
3	10	(United Kingdom) Dario Franchitti	Chip Ganassi Racing	Honda	210.525
OFFICIAL REPORT

=== Rookie orientation program — Thursday, May 10 ===
- Weather: 63 °F (17 °C), partly cloudy
- Practice summary: On the first day of track activity in the month of May, eight rookies took to the Indianapolis Motor Speedway track. Of these eight drivers, seven of them passed the mandatory Rookie Orientation Program with James Jakes leading the speed charts during the day with a top lap at 218.266 mph. Bryan Clauson, Josef Newgarden, Rubens Barrichello, Simon Pagenaud, Michel Jourdain Jr., and Wade Cunningham were all able to break 210 mph during the practice. Jean Alesi was the only driver not to pass the first two phases the program, running his best lap at 186.387 mph, however he was given permission to return the following day for more practice. On Friday May 11, Alesi completed the first two phases.

Top Practice Speeds
Pos	No.	Driver	Team	Engine	Speed
1	19	(United Kingdom) James Jakes R	Dale Coyne Racing	Honda	218.268
2	39	(United States) Bryan Clauson R	Sarah Fisher Hartman Racing	Honda	217.046
3	67	(United States) Josef Newgarden R	Sarah Fisher Hartman Racing	Honda	216.573
OFFICIAL REPORT

== Practice ==
=== Opening Day — Saturday, May 12 ===
- Weather: 74 °F (23 °C), partly cloudy
- Practice summary: Rookie Josef Newgarden led the way, while J. R. Hildebrand led the tow chart. Townsend Bell was not at the track, as he was competing in an American Le Mans race at Laguna Seca. Among the other drivers not making laps were Katherine Legge and Sébastien Bourdais, who were currently without an engine deal. The first cars on the track were the three Penske Racing cars, who completed a parade lap with all three cars alongside. Marco Andretti did not spend any time in his own car, but shook down the 17 and 25 cars for a couple laps.

Top Practice Speeds
Pos	No.	Driver	Team	Engine	Speed
1	67	(United States) Josef Newgarden R	Sarah Fisher Hartman Racing	Honda	220.250
2	4	(United States) J. R. Hildebrand	Panther Racing	Chevrolet	219.693
3	39	(United States) Bryan Clauson R	Sarah Fisher Hartman Racing	Honda	219.632
OFFICIAL REPORT

=== Open practice — Sunday, May 13 ===
- Weather: 75 °F (24 °C), partly cloudy
- Practice summary: A total of 33 cars completed 1,138 practice laps without incident. Wade Cunningham completed the third phase of the rookie test, early in the day's practice session. Six drivers completed laps over 220 mph.

Top Practice Speeds
Pos	No.	Driver	Team	Engine	Speed
1	17	(Colombia) Sebastián Saavedra	AFS Racing/Andretti Autosport	Chevrolet	221.526
2	39	(United States) Bryan Clauson R	Sarah Fisher Hartman Racing	Honda	221.173
3	67	(United States) Josef Newgarden R	Sarah Fisher Hartman Racing	Honda	221.158
OFFICIAL REPORT

=== Open practice — Monday, May 14 ===
- Weather: 78 °F (26 °C), partly cloudy
- Practice summary: After days of struggles, Jean Alesi finally completed the third phase of rookie orientation. This was accomplished with the approved use of the qualifying boost, which gave them an extra 5–6 mph. Graham Rahal's car suffered engine woes, the first of the month at Indianapolis. A total of 1,199 laps were completed without incident.

Top Practice Speeds
Pos	No.	Driver	Team	Engine	Speed
1	67	(United States) Josef Newgarden R	Sarah Fisher Hartman Racing	Honda	222.486
2	28	(United States) Ryan Hunter-Reay	Andretti Autosport	Chevrolet	221.639
3	26	(United States) Marco Andretti	Andretti Autosport	Chevrolet	221.519
OFFICIAL REPORT

=== Open practice — Tuesday, May 15 ===
- Weather: 79 °F (26 °C), partly cloudy
- Practice summary: The busiest day of practice thus far saw Marco Andretti set the fastest lap of the month at 223.676 mph. Thirty car/driver combinations completed 1,602 laps without incident. Most of the day focused on race setups and drafting practice. Dragon Racing drivers Sébastien Bourdais and Katherine Legge had yet to turn a lap all month, as the team was trying to get out of their contract with Lotus.

Top Practice Speeds
Pos	No.	Driver	Team	Engine	Speed
1	26	(United States) Marco Andretti	Andretti Autosport	Chevrolet	223.676
2	3	(Brazil) Hélio Castroneves	Team Penske	Chevrolet	222.025
3	27	(Canada) James Hinchcliffe	Andretti Autosport	Chevrolet	221.864
OFFICIAL REPORT

=== Open practice — Wednesday, May 16 ===
- Weather: 76 °F (24 °C), partly cloudy
- Practice summary: Rookie Josef Newgarden led the speed chart with a lap of 222.785 mph, but also became the first car to suffer an incident on the track. With 16 minutes left in the day, Newgarden lost the back end at the exit of turn four, did two 360° spins, and tapped the inside wall on the mainstretch. Newgarden was not injured, and the car suffered only minor damage to the front wing and rear wheel assembly. A total of 30 cars completed 1,632 laps, the busiest day thus far during the month. Off the track, Dragon Racing, acquired a Chevrolet engine and began installing it in one of their cars, in preparations for Katherine Legge and Sébastien Bourdais to pass their rookie and refresher test, respectively, Thursday morning.

Top Practice Speeds
Pos	No.	Driver	Team	Engine	Speed
1	67	(United States) Josef Newgarden R	Sarah Fisher Hartman Racing	Honda	222.785
2	26	(United States) Marco Andretti	Andretti Autosport	Chevrolet	222.108
3	28	(United States) Ryan Hunter-Reay	Andretti Autosport	Chevrolet	221.763
OFFICIAL REPORT

=== Open practice — Thursday, May 17 ===
- Weather: 74 °F (23 °C), partly cloudy
- Practice summary: The track opened early to give extra track time for Dragon Racing drivers Sébastien Bourdais and Katherine Legge. Bourdais completed his refresher course in the morning, and Legge completed ROP phase one, both in the Dragon #6 car. The track opened for all drivers at 1 p.m. Thursday was the final day of practice with race day turbocharger boost settings of 130 kPa. A total of 29 drivers took laps, with no incidents reported. Legge was granted additional time in the evening til 6:40 p.m., during which she completed the second phase of rookie orientation.

Top Practice Speeds
Pos	No.	Driver	Team	Engine	Speed
1	9	(New Zealand) Scott Dixon	Chip Ganassi Racing	Honda	223.088
2	67	(United States) Josef Newgarden R	Sarah Fisher Hartman Racing	Honda	222.709
3	38	(United States) Graham Rahal	Chip Ganassi Racing	Honda	222.080
OFFICIAL REPORT

=== Fast Friday practice — Friday, May 18 ===
- Weather: 81 °F (27 °C), sunny
- Practice summary: "Fast Friday" practice was the final full day of practice prior to time trials. Turbocharger boost settings were elevated to 140 kPa for this session, as well as for time trials. Marco Andretti (227.540 mph) set the fastest lap of the day and of the month on a sunny, hot afternoon. All cars took laps except for Oriol Servià, who experienced engine trouble. No wall contact was reported, but Michel Jourdain Jr. suffered a blown engine and a subsequent oil fire on his car early in the session. For the first time since 1998, the entire first week of practice was conducted without any time lost due to rain.

Top Practice Speeds
Pos	No.	Driver	Team	Engine	Speed
1	26	(United States) Marco Andretti	Andretti Autosport	Chevrolet	227.540
2	2	(Australia) Ryan Briscoe	Team Penske	Chevrolet	226.835
3	3	(Brazil) Hélio Castroneves	Team Penske	Chevrolet	226.716
OFFICIAL REPORT

== Time Trials ==
=== Saturday May 19 – Pole Day ===
- Weather:

==== Practice ====
- Practice summary:

Top Practice Speeds
Pos	No.	Driver	Team	Engine	Speed
1	3	(Brazil) Hélio Castroneves	Team Penske	Chevrolet	227.744
2	25	(Brazil) Ana Beatriz	Andretti Autosport/Conquest Racing	Chevrolet	226.187
3	2	(Australia) Ryan Briscoe	Team Penske	Chevrolet	226.027
OFFICIAL REPORT

==== Qualifying ====
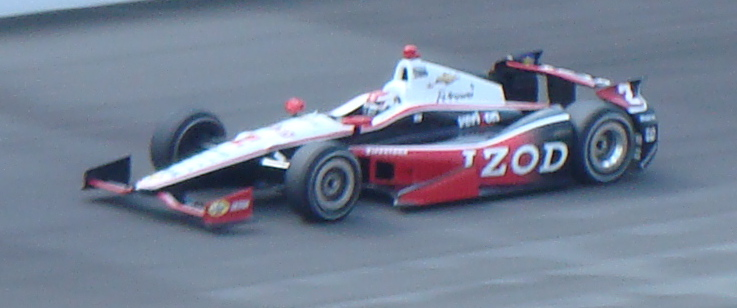
Ryan Briscoe makes his pole-winning qualification run.

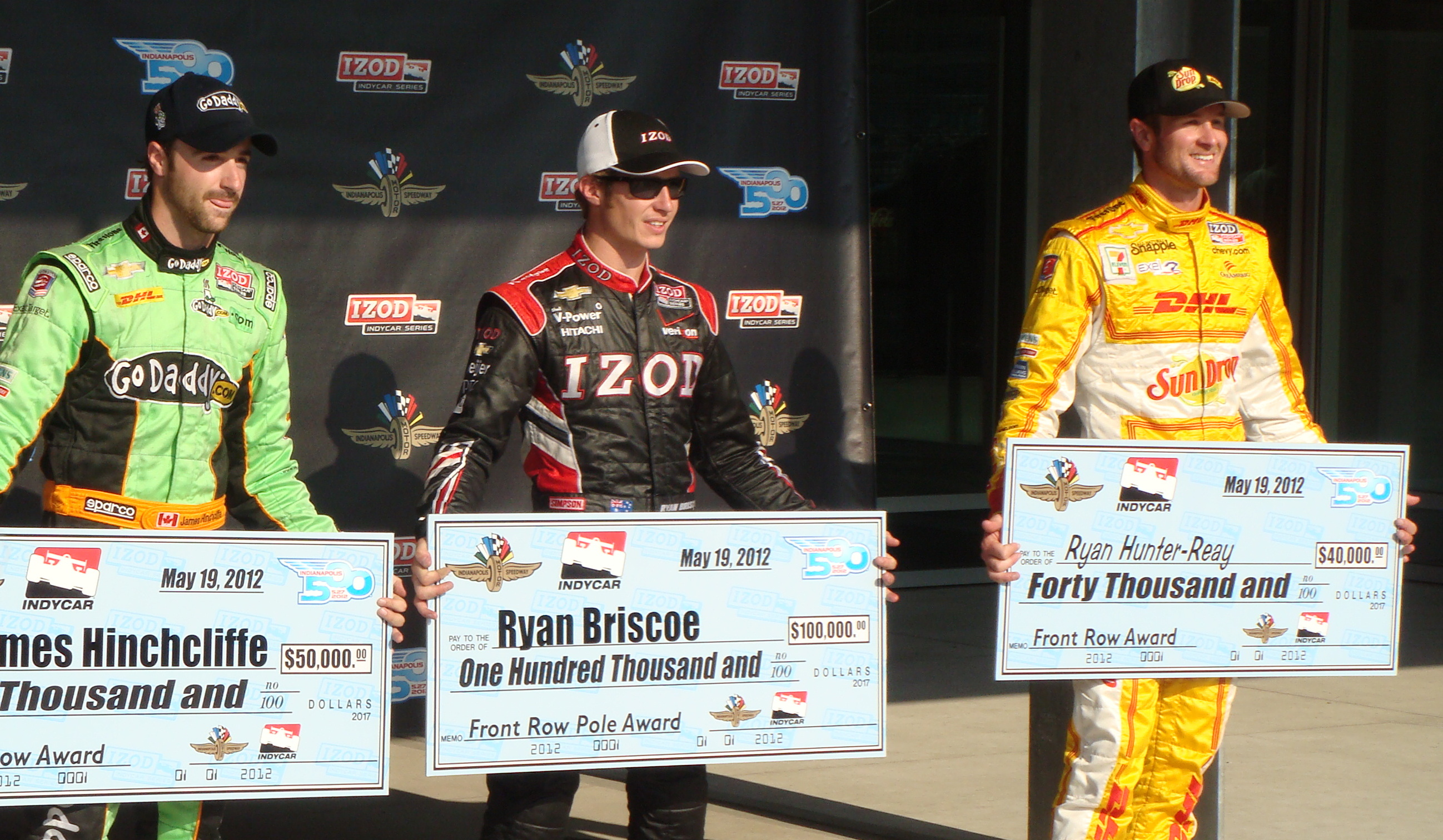
Front-row qualifiers (L to R): James Hinchcliffe, Ryan Briscoe, and Ryan Hunter-Reay.

- Qualifying draw: Results
- First segment summary: Tony Kanaan was the first driver out on the track, but his time was later disallowed after it was discovered he was missing a ballast on the rear view mirror. He would re-qualify later in the day. Mike Conway also had his time disallowed after inspection, as the car was found to be underweight. Bryan Clauson wrecked on his fourth qualifying lap, but despite a lot of damage to the car, the team was not planning on going to a backup car. Oriol Servià spun exiting turn four on his final warmup lap, hitting the inside wall and the pit wall. Ed Carpenter was bumped from the field and crashed heavily on his attempt to re-enter the field. Wade Cunningham, Mike Conway and Sébastien Bourdais were also bumped from the field of 24. Sebastián Saavedra started his qualifying run as the gun sounded, after Conway's crew changed the tires after going through technical inspection. Katherine Legge's run was waved off because her team was not in place to give the starter instructions. The nine drivers to advance to the fast nine were James Hinchcliffe, Will Power, Ryan Hunter-Reay, Hélio Castroneves, Ryan Briscoe, Tony Kanaan, Marco Andretti, Josef Newgarden and E. J. Viso.
- Fast Nine Shootout summary: Viso and Kanaan waved off their runs, and neither returned to the track for the session. Newgarden pulled his car from the line shortly afterward; he returned later and, in light of his team-mate's crash, set a conservative run of 224.037 mph. Ryan Briscoe set down an early quick time of 226.484 mph, as the second driver to complete a full qualifying run. Only James Hinchcliffe came close to topping his time on their first run, falling short by a scant .003 miles per hour. Castroneves made an attempt at a second run, but it was much slower and was waved off after the first lap. Power also made a second attempt, but waved it off after three laps. Hinchcliffe's second run was waved off by race control after it became clear he would not go faster on his second run. Ryan Hunter-Reay was the only car that picked up speed on a second run, but did not gain any positions. Ryan Briscoe held on to take the pole position, by the closest margin in Indianapolis 500 history.

Pole Day – Saturday, May 19, 2012
Pos	No.	Driver	Team	Engine	Speed	Pts
Fast Nine Shootout (positions 1–9)
1	2	(Australia) Ryan Briscoe	Team Penske	Chevrolet	226.484	15
2	27	(Canada) James Hinchcliffe	Andretti Autosport	Chevrolet	226.481	13
3	28	(United States) Ryan Hunter-Reay	Andretti Autosport	Chevrolet	226.240	12
4	26	(United States) Marco Andretti	Andretti Autosport	Chevrolet	225.456	11
5	12	(Australia) Will Power	Team Penske	Chevrolet	225.422	10
6	3	(Brazil) Hélio Castroneves	Team Penske	Chevrolet	225.172	9
7	67	(United States) Josef Newgarden R	Sarah Fisher Hartman Racing	Honda	224.037	8
8	11	(Brazil) Tony Kanaan	KV Racing Technology	Chevrolet	224.751 ^{Q1}	7
9	5	(Venezuela) E. J. Viso	KV Racing Technology	Chevrolet	224.422 ^{Q1}	6
Positions 10–24
10	8	(Brazil) Rubens Barrichello R	KV Racing Technology	Chevrolet	224.264	4
11	98	(Canada) Alex Tagliani	Team Barracuda – BHA	Honda	224.000	4
12	38	(United States) Graham Rahal	Chip Ganassi Racing	Honda	223.959	4
13	25	(Brazil) Ana Beatriz	Andretti Autosport/Conquest Racing	Chevrolet	223.920	4
14	83	(United States) Charlie Kimball	Chip Ganassi Racing	Honda	223.868	4
15	9	(New Zealand) Scott Dixon	Chip Ganassi Racing	Honda	223.684	4
16	50	(United Kingdom) Dario Franchitti	Chip Ganassi Racing	Honda	223.582	4
17	19	(United Kingdom) James Jakes R	Dale Coyne Racing	Honda	223.482	4
18	4	(United States) J. R. Hildebrand	Panther Racing	Chevrolet	223.422	4
19	15	(Japan) Takuma Sato	Rahal Letterman Lanigan Racing	Honda	223.392	4
20	99	(United States) Townsend Bell	Schmidt–Hamilton Motorsports	Honda	223.134	4
21	18	(United Kingdom) Justin Wilson	Dale Coyne Racing	Honda	222.929	4
22	30	(Mexico) Michel Jourdain Jr.	Rahal Letterman Lanigan Racing	Honda	222.893	4
23	77	(France) Simon Pagenaud R	Schmidt–Hamilton Motorsports	Honda	222.891	4
24	17	(Colombia) Sebastián Saavedra	Andretti Autosport/AFS Racing	Chevrolet	222.811	4
Other Attempts
	41	(New Zealand) Wade Cunningham R	A. J. Foyt Enterprises	Honda	222.689	
	14	(United Kingdom) Mike Conway	A. J. Foyt Enterprises	Honda	222.434	
	7	(France) Sébastien Bourdais	Dragon Racing	Chevrolet	222.415	
	39	(United States) Bryan Clauson R	Sarah Fisher Hartman Racing	Honda	Crashed	
	20	(United States) Ed Carpenter	Ed Carpenter Racing	Chevrolet	Crashed	
	6	(United Kingdom) Katherine Legge R	Dragon Racing	Chevrolet	Waved Off	
	22	(Spain) Oriol Servià	Panther/Dreyer & Reinbold Racing	Chevrolet	Crashed	
	78	(Switzerland) Simona de Silvestro	HVM Racing	Lotus	N/A	
	64	(France) Jean Alesi R	Fan Force United	Lotus	N/A	
OFFICIAL REPORT

^{Q1} The driver waved off and did not make an attempt during Q2. Per INDYCAR rules, Q1 times determine positions after the drivers who completed Q2.

=== Sunday May 20 – Bump Day ===
- Weather:

==== Practice ====
- Practice summary:

Top Practice Speeds
Pos	No.	Driver	Team	Engine	Speed
1	22	(Spain) Oriol Servià	Panther/Dreyer & Reinbold Racing	Chevrolet	223.752
2	7	(France) Sébastien Bourdais	Dragon Racing	Chevrolet	223.479
3	20T	(United States) Ed Carpenter	Ed Carpenter Racing	Chevrolet	222.886
OFFICIAL REPORT

==== Qualifying ====
- Bump Day summary: Before the opening of the track, Jay Howard and Pippa Mann announced they would not make attempts to qualify for the field, with Howard citing an engine deal that had fallen apart. There had been some rumors that IndyCar had stopped last minute deals from coming together, with Mann and Howard's deals falling apart at the last moments, though Randy Bernard stated on his Twitter account that this was not the case.

Bump Day – Sunday, May 20, 2012
Pos	No.	Driver	Team	Engine	Speed	Pts
25	7	(France) Sébastien Bourdais	Dragon Racing	Chevrolet	223.760	3
26	41	(New Zealand) Wade Cunningham R	A. J. Foyt Enterprises	Honda	223.258	3
27	22	(Spain) Oriol Servià	Panther/Dreyer & Reinbold Racing	Chevrolet	222.393	3
28	20T	(United States) Ed Carpenter	Ed Carpenter Racing	Chevrolet	222.324	3
29	14	(United Kingdom) Mike Conway	A. J. Foyt Enterprises	Honda	222.319	3
30	6	(United Kingdom) Katherine Legge R	Dragon Racing	Chevrolet	221.624	3
31	39	(United States) Bryan Clauson R	Sarah Fisher Hartman Racing	Honda	214.455	3
32	78	(Switzerland) Simona de Silvestro	HVM Racing	Lotus	214.393	3
33	64	(France) Jean Alesi R	Fan Force United	Lotus	210.094	3
OFFICIAL REPORT

== Carb Day ==
=== Final practice — Friday, May 25 ===
- Weather: TBA
- Practice summary: TBA

Top Practice Speeds
Pos	No.	Driver	Team	Engine	Speed
1	50	(United Kingdom) Dario Franchitti	Chip Ganassi Racing	Honda	222.360
2	9	(New Zealand) Scott Dixon	Chip Ganassi Racing	Honda	222.274
3	26	(United States) Marco Andretti	Andretti Autosport	Chevrolet	221.702
OFFICIAL REPORT

=== Pit Stop Challenge ===
The 35th annual Pit Stop Challenge was held on Friday May 27. The competition featured twelve participants in a single-elimination bracket-style match-up. Four teams received byes, while eight teams competed in the first round. A total purse of $100,000 was at stake, with $50,000 going to the winning team. The format has two cars competing in a layout that resembles a drag race. The cars race from a standing start and drive into the pit box, change four tires, simulate a refueling, and race to a finish line a few hundred feet down the pit lane.

Chip Ganassi Racing won the pit stop competition for the first time, with driver Scott Dixon.

First Round
27	James Hinchcliffe (Andretti Autosport)
38	Graham Rahal (Chip Ganassi Racing)
4	J. R. Hildebrand (Panther Racing)
12	Will Power (Team Penske)
14	Mike Conway (A. J. Foyt Racing)
22	Oriol Servia (Dreyer & Reinbold)
26	Marco Andretti (Andretti Autosport)
28	Ryan Hunter-Reay (Andretti Autosport)

Quarterfinals
9	Scott Dixon (Chip Ganassi Racing)	13.941
38	Graham Rahal (Chip Ganassi Racing)	17.166
2	Ryan Briscoe (Team Penske)
12	Will Power (Team Penske)
3	Helio Castroneves (Team Penske)
22	Oriol Servia (Dreyer & Reinbold)
50	Dario Franchitti (Chip Ganassi Racing)
28	Ryan Hunter-Reay (Andretti Autosport)

Semifinals
9	Scott Dixon (Chip Ganassi Racing)	13.385
12	Will Power (Team Penske)	13.695
50	Dario Franchitti (Chip Ganassi Racing)
22	Oriol Servia (Dreyer & Reinbold)

Finals
9	Scott Dixon (Chip Ganassi Racing)	13.769
22	Oriol Servia (Dreyer & Reinbold)	17.194

Source: Daily Trackside Report

== Starting grid ==
Row	Inside		Middle		Outside	
1	2	(Australia) Ryan Briscoe	27	(Canada) James Hinchcliffe	28	(United States) Ryan Hunter-Reay
2	26	(United States) Marco Andretti	12	(Australia) Will Power	3	(Brazil) Hélio Castroneves W
3	67	(United States) Josef Newgarden R	11	(Brazil) Tony Kanaan	5	(Venezuela) E. J. Viso
4	8	(Brazil) Rubens Barrichello R	98	(Canada) Alex Tagliani	38	(United States) Graham Rahal
5	25	(Brazil) Ana Beatriz	83	(United States) Charlie Kimball	9	(New Zealand) Scott Dixon W
6	50	(United Kingdom) Dario Franchitti W	19	(United Kingdom) James Jakes R	4	(United States) J. R. Hildebrand
7	15	(Japan) Takuma Sato	99	(United States) Townsend Bell	18	(United Kingdom) Justin Wilson
8	30	(Mexico) Michel Jourdain Jr.	77	(France) Simon Pagenaud R	17	(Colombia) Sebastián Saavedra
9	7	(France) Sébastien Bourdais	41	(New Zealand) Wade Cunningham R	22	(Spain) Oriol Servià
10	20	(United States) Ed Carpenter	14	(United Kingdom) Mike Conway	6	(United Kingdom) Katherine Legge R
11	39	(United States) Bryan Clauson R	78	(Switzerland) Simona de Silvestro	64	(France) Jean Alesi R

W = Former Indianapolis 500 winner

R = Indianapolis 500 rookie

== Race summary ==
=== Start ===
Ryan Briscoe led from the start, was drafted and overtaken by James Hinchcliffe, who led at the end of the first lap. The pair swapped the lead again by the end of lap two. There were no accidents at the start and the green flag was given at the first attempt to start the race.

=== First half ===
Ryan Hunter-Reay overtook Marco Andretti before Bryan Clauson spun exiting turn one, akin to Danny Sullivan's spin in 1985, and brought out a caution period. Under caution many drivers chose to enter pit lane. Josef Newgarden stalled in the pits, was restarted and rejoined the race. 2007 and 2010 winner Dario Franchitti spun at his pit box, due to being hit from behind by E. J. Viso, but like Newgarden lost less time as the safety car was deployed. Jean Alesi and Simona de Silvestro were black flagged for failing to run within 105% of the front pace and duly retired. Upon the restart, which was intended to be single file, cars were seen on the pit straight before entering turn one as many as five abreast. At 32 laps Marco Andretti led from James Hinchcliffe and Ryan Briscoe. On lap 33 the stewards declared that Viso would not be penalised for the pit lane incident. No driver was able to pull away a substantial lead over the driver behind and cars behind appeared to face an aerodynamic advantage over those ahead. Takuma Sato then started to set fastest laps by lap 37 and Marco Andretti had led most laps with 15.

At the end of lap 46 the pitstops occurred for fuel and tires with Hinchcliffe and Castroneves pitting. Castroneves' pitstop was delayed due to a tire fitting problem. Scott Dixon and Dario Franchitti stopped a lap later. Josef Newgarden stalled again at his second stop, unable to put the car in gear. The Ganassis of Dixon and Franchitti had been setting the fastest pace. By lap 50, one quarter distance, and after the first full pits, Marco Andretti led. There had been six leaders and twelve changes of lead.

At the end of lap 75 James Hinchcliffe pitted, then all three Penske cars pitted simultaneously, and Castroneves almost stalled, making it his second flawed pitstop. Pit stops left Dixon leading with Franchitti second some 11 second behind. On lap 79 Mike Conway was given a drive through penalty for hitting a crew member in the pits and breaking his front wing. Conway collided with Will Power and caused a caution, the second of the race, on lap 81. Conway was driving slower than Power, having just left the pits, and slid. The rear of the car lost grip and Conway slid backwards into the wall, and Power hit Conway's spinning car with nowhere left to go as he caught Conway's car on the exit of the turn. The safety car remained out until the end of lap 88. Ana Beatriz spun on the exit of turn one and hit the wall, bringing out another full course caution with her car stopping in the middle of the track. Cars pitted under caution including Hinchcliffe. Dixon and Franchitti led.

=== Second half ===
At the half distance point the leaderboard was Dixon, Franchitti, Hunter-Reay, Rahal, Wilson, Sato, Kimball, Hildebrand, Bell. On lap 110 Briscoe had a gearbox issue and ran more slowly for a lap and put the car into an emergency gearbox setting whilst running seventeenth. Hunter-Reay stopped for fuel and tires on lap 113. This left all of the top six runners being Honda powered, in contrast to pre-race predictions on relative engine performance and economy. On lap 115 Hildebrand pitted from sixteenth. Rahal pitted afterwards. On lap 119 Franchitti pit stopped from second place with no adjustments made to the car and the following lap Dixon pitted from the lead having led for a total of 37 laps by that stage. This left Sato leading, the eighteenth leader of the day. Andretti ran second. Sato pitted from the lead on lap 124. On lap 125 Hinchcliffe pitted and Barrichello who had led for one lap pitted. On lap 126 Sato lead, with Franchitti behind. On lap 128 Ryan Hunter-Reay retired with a failure of an upright on the car's suspension. On lap 134 the leaderboard stood as Sato, Franchitti, Andretti, Dixon, Rahal. On lap 145 Andretti pitted having complained about a vibration on the car and replaced the tires. Rahal also pitted just before. The caution was issued on lap 146 when Saavedra stopped on the exit of the pitlane. Starting lap 147 under caution the majority of the lead drivers stopped including Sato, Franchitti, Dixon, Rahal, Hinchcliffe and more. Following such pitstops, by lap 150 Sato led followed by Franchitti, Dixon, Hinchcliffe, Wilson, Kimball, Briscoe, Kanaan and Castroneves. On lap 153 the restart occurred and Franchiti passed Sato on the backstraight of the circuit and at the start of lap 154 Dixon passed Sato for second into turn one. On lap 160 Dixon started to pressure Franchitti and had come under pressure from Sato behind. Dixon passed for the lead but starting lap 161 Dario Franchitti retook the lead at turn one. On lap 163 Josef Newgarden stopped due to engine problems, pulling over to the left hand area of grass on the inside of the track on the backstraight between turns two and three, bringing out the safety car and another full course caution. Sato, Franchitti and Dixon pitted under caution, along with Hinchcliffe and others. Hinchcliffe stopped for a longer period than the others and appeared to run over some pit equipment upon exiting. Prior to the restart Dixon led from Franchiti and Sato. On lap 171 the race restarted. Wilson passed Sato upon the restart. Franchitti repassed Dixon. Starting lap 173 Wilson was repassed by Sato and soon was passed by Carpenter, Kanaan and Kimball having run high on the exit of the turn when passed by Sato and lost speed. By lap 176, 28 lead changes had taken place, one fewer than the 1960 record of 29 changes in one Indianapolis 500 race. Starting lap 178 when Franchitti overtook Dixon this broke the record. The leading Ganassi pair of Franchitti and Dixon appeared to express concern over fuel consumption and speed. On lap 180 Carpenter spun but did not hit the wall, spinning across the track and coming to a halt, then gesticulating at marshals to help turn the car around. This caused a full course caution and seemingly eliminated the need for the leaders to need to refuel. Carpenter then continued. On lap 187 Andretti overcalculated and drove into the wall, sliding across the track and coming to a halt.

=== Finish ===
Tony Kanaan led the race during the caution, but when the green flag waved he soon fell to fourth behind Franchitti, Dixon and Sato. Teammates Franchitti and Dixon traded the lead several times until the start of lap 199, when Franchitti took the lead from Dixon and Sato followed him through into second place. On the final lap, Sato attempted a pass on Franchitti in turn one but spun and hit the turn 1 wall. Franchitti won the race, with Dixon second and Kanaan third. Under the final caution flag of the day, the three friends lined up to cross the finish line side by side.

In Victory Lane, Franchitti dedicated his win to the memory of 2005 and 2011 champion Dan Wheldon. When asked about the final-lap incident, he said that he had moved up the track to give Sato room on the inside. Sato had a different view, claiming that Franchitti had forced him nearly into the grass and caused him to lose control. Race officials ruled it a racing incident and confirmed Franchitti as the winner.

Owing to the newly introduced engine formula, Dario Franchitti earned the distinction of the first driver to win in both a normally aspirated and turbocharged engine since Arie Luyendyk (1990 and 1997). Franchitti's victories in 2007 and 2010 came while the series was utilizing normally aspirated engines. Franchitti also became the first driver to win the race with a V-6 engine since George Robson in 1946.

== Box score ==
Pos	No.	Driver	Team	Chassis	Engine	Laps	Status	Grid	Points
1	50	(United Kingdom) Dario Franchitti W	Chip Ganassi Racing	Dallara DW12	Honda	200	167.734 mph	16	54
2	9	(New Zealand) Scott Dixon W	Chip Ganassi Racing	Dallara DW12	Honda	200	+0.0295	15	44
3	11	(Brazil) Tony Kanaan	KV Racing Technology	Dallara DW12	Chevrolet	200	+0.0677	8	42
4	22	(Spain) Oriol Servià	Panther/Dreyer & Reinbold Racing	Dallara DW12	Chevrolet	200	+2.9166	27	38
5	2	(Australia) Ryan Briscoe	Team Penske	Dallara DW12	Chevrolet	200	+3.6721	1	45
6	27	(Canada) James Hinchcliffe	Andretti Autosport	Dallara DW12	Chevrolet	200	+4.0962	2	41
7	18	(United Kingdom) Justin Wilson	Dale Coyne Racing	Dallara DW12	Honda	200	+4.2430	21	30
8	83	(United States) Charlie Kimball	Chip Ganassi Racing	Dallara DW12	Honda	200	+4.6056	14	28
9	99	(United States) Townsend Bell	Schmidt–Hamilton Motorsports	Dallara DW12	Honda	200	+5.6168	20	26
10	3	(Brazil) Hélio Castroneves W	Team Penske	Dallara DW12	Chevrolet	200	+7.6352	6	29
11	8	(Brazil) Rubens Barrichello R	KV Racing Technology	Dallara DW12	Chevrolet	200	+7.9240	10	23
12	98	(Canada) Alex Tagliani	Team Barracuda – BHA	Dallara DW12	Honda	200	+8.2543	11	22
13	38	(United States) Graham Rahal	Chip Ganassi Racing	Dallara DW12	Honda	200	+8.7539	12	21
14	4	(United States) J. R. Hildebrand	Panther Racing	Dallara DW12	Chevrolet	200	+11.3423	18	20
15	19	(United Kingdom) James Jakes R	Dale Coyne Racing	Dallara DW12	Honda	200	+13.4494	17	19
16	77	(France) Simon Pagenaud R	Schmidt–Hamilton Motorsports	Dallara DW12	Honda	200	+14.1382	23	18
17	15	(Japan) Takuma Sato	Rahal Letterman Lanigan Racing	Dallara DW12	Honda	199	Crash T1	19	17
18	5	(Venezuela) E. J. Viso	KV Racing Technology	Dallara DW12	Chevrolet	199	-1 lap	9	18
19	30	(Mexico) Michel Jourdain Jr.	Rahal Letterman Lanigan Racing	Dallara DW12	Honda	199	-1 lap	22	16
20	7	(France) Sébastien Bourdais	Dragon Racing	Dallara DW12	Chevrolet	199	-1 lap	25	15
21	20	(United States) Ed Carpenter	Ed Carpenter Racing	Dallara DW12	Chevrolet	199	-1 lap	28	15
22	6	(United Kingdom) Katherine Legge R	Dragon Racing	Dallara DW12	Chevrolet	199	-1 lap	30	15
23	25	(Brazil) Ana Beatriz	Andretti Autosport/Conquest Racing	Dallara DW12	Chevrolet	190	-10 laps	13	16
24	26	(United States) Marco Andretti	Andretti Autosport	Dallara DW12	Chevrolet	187	Contact	4	23
25	67	(United States) Josef Newgarden R	Sarah Fisher Hartman Racing	Dallara DW12	Honda	161	Mechanical	7	18
26	17	(Colombia) Sebastián Saavedra	Andretti Autosport/AFS Racing	Dallara DW12	Chevrolet	143	Electrical	24	14
27	28	(United States) Ryan Hunter-Reay	Andretti Autosport	Dallara DW12	Chevrolet	123	Suspension	3	22
28	12	(Australia) Will Power	Team Penske	Dallara DW12	Chevrolet	79	Contact	5	20
29	14	(United Kingdom) Mike Conway	A. J. Foyt Enterprises	Dallara DW12	Honda	78	Contact	29	13
30	39	(United States) Bryan Clauson R	Sarah Fisher Hartman Racing	Dallara DW12	Honda	46	Mechanical	31	13
31	41	(New Zealand) Wade Cunningham R	A. J. Foyt Enterprises	Dallara DW12	Honda	42	Electrical	26	13
32	78	(Switzerland) Simona de Silvestro	HVM Racing	Dallara DW12	Lotus	10	Black Flagged	32	13
33	64	(France) Jean Alesi R	Fan Force United	Dallara DW12	Lotus	9	Black Flagged	33	13

W Former Indianapolis 500 winner

R Indianapolis 500 Rookie

All entrants utilized Firestone tires.

Jean Alesi was penalized 2 laps for ignoring the black flag, which dropped him to last as he had been in front of Simona de Silvestro when they were both black flagged under the 105% rule.

=== Race statistics ===
Lap Leaders
Laps	Leader
1	James Hinchcliffe
2–4	Ryan Briscoe
5–6	James Hinchcliffe
7–15	Ryan Briscoe
16–17	James Hinchcliffe
18–19	Ryan Briscoe
20–21	Marco Andretti
22	Ryan Briscoe
23–44	Marco Andretti
45–46	Alex Tagliani
47	Scott Dixon
48–49	Charlie Kimball
50–73	Marco Andretti
74–78	Scott Dixon
79	Charlie Kimball
80–90	Marco Andretti
91–118	Scott Dixon
119–123	Takuma Sato
124–125	Rubens Barrichello
126–146	Takuma Sato
147	Scott Dixon
148–152	Takuma Sato
153–159	Dario Franchitti
160	Scott Dixon
161–162	Dario Franchitti
163–171	Scott Dixon
172–173	Dario Franchitti
174–176	Scott Dixon
177	Dario Franchitti
178	Scott Dixon
179–186	Dario Franchitti
187–193	Tony Kanaan
194	Dario Franchitti
195–198	Scott Dixon
199–200	Dario Franchitti

Total laps led
Driver	Laps
Marco Andretti	59
Scott Dixon	53
Takuma Sato	31
Dario Franchitti	23
Ryan Briscoe	15
Tony Kanaan	7
James Hinchcliffe	5
Charlie Kimball	3
Rubens Barrichello	2
Alex Tagliani	2

Cautions: 8 for 39 laps
Laps	Reason
14–17	Bryan Clauson spin in turn 2
80–86	Will Power, Mike Conway crash in turn 2
90–94	Ana Beatriz spin in turn 2
146–151	Sebastián Saavedra stalled on track
164–170	Josef Newgarden stalled on track
181–183	Ed Carpenter spin in turn 1
188–193	Marco Andretti crash in turn 1
200	Takuma Sato crash in turn 1

== Broadcasting ==
=== Television ===
Time trials and Carb Day were covered live in the United States on NBC Sports Network. The on-air crew consisted of Bob Jenkins, Jon Beekhuis, and Wally Dallenbach Jr. Pit reporters included Marty Snider, Kevin Lee, Derek Daly, and Townsend Bell (who also qualified for the race). Robin Miller served as a reporter and "insider". During the Carb Day broadcast Bob Jenkins announced that he would retire from race broadcasting following the season finale in Fontana on September 15 to spend more time with his at the time ailing wife Pam who was diagnosed with brain cancer. Pam died on October 25.

The 2012 Indianapolis 500 (race day) was broadcast live in high definition in the United States on ABC. ESPN3 simulcast the race with an alternate feed of twelve in-car cameras. The overnight television rating for the race was 4.1, and 1.9 for the pre-race. The Fast National rating of 4.34 and 6.9 million viewers marked the highest ratings since 2008.

ABC Television
Booth Announcers	Pit/garage reporters
Host: Brent Musburger; Announcer: Marty Reid; Color: Scott Goodyear; Color: Eddie Cheever	Jerry Punch; Vince Welch; Jamie Little; Rick DeBruhl

=== Radio ===
The IMS Radio Network broadcast the race live on approximately 400 affiliates, as well as AFN, the LeSEA broadcasting network, and World Harvest Radio. The broadcast was carried on XM channel 94 and Sirius channel 212. Mike King served as chief announcer for the 14th year (18th year overall with the crew). Davey Hamilton, who did not secure a ride for the race (the first time since 2006), returned to the booth and served as "driver expert".

For 2012, the commercial out-cues used were both renditions by the former "Voices of the 500" and those recited by drivers in the starting field.

1070 The Fan broadcast nightly with Trackside with Curt Cavin and Kevin Lee, followed by Donald Davidson's The Talk of Gasoline Alley.

Indianapolis Motor Speedway Radio Network
Booth Announcers	Turn Reporters	Pit/garage reporters
Chief Announcer: Mike King; Driver expert: Davey Hamilton; Color: Paul Page; Historian: Donald Davidson; Analyst: Jerry Baker	Turn 1: not used Turn 2: Jake Query; Turn 3: Mark Jaynes hTurn 4: Chris Denari	Kevin Lee (north/center pits); Michael Young (center pits); Nick Yeoman (south pits); Dave Wilson (garages)

Previous race: 2012 São Paulo Indy 300	IndyCar Series; 2012 season	Next race: 2012 Detroit Belle Isle Grand Prix
Previous race: 2011 Indianapolis 500	Indianapolis 500	Next race: 2013 Indianapolis 500
