= Fan Force United =

American racing team

(United States) Fan Force United
- Team principal(s): Tyce Carlson; Tim Donahue; Chris Williams
- Former series: Indy Lights, IndyCar Series

Fan Force United was an American racing team formerly in the Indy Lights series. The team was owned by former driver Tyce Carlson, along with Tim Donahue and Chris Williams.

== Indy Lights ==
The team purchased assets from Alliance Motorsports, who were unable to run in the 2011 Indy Lights season due to Shane Hmiel's accident at Terre Haute Action Track, and were housed in a shop formerly used by Dallara. Fan Force United started the 2012 Indy Lights season with driver Armaan Ebrahim but released him after Detroit. The team fielded a second entry and used various drivers for both including Bryan Clauson, Emerson Newton-John and Stefan Wilson, but did not run all the races. The team had no funding and was forced to sit out the 2013 Indy Lights season. Scott Anderson joined the team for the 2014 Indy Lights season and its return. Tim Donahue from Automotive Management Group joined as an owner. Sarah Fisher Hartman Racing was to join with the team to field an additional car for Kyle O'Gara in the 2014 Freedom 100, but the entry was withdrawn due to lack of pace.

== IndyCar Series ==
=== 2012 Indianapolis 500 ===
Fan Force United fielded an entry for Jean Alesi in the 2012 Indianapolis 500 with backing from Lotus and sponsorship from F. P. Journe. The Dallara DW12 car was a Lotus test chassis and the team hired Buddy Lazier as a driving coach. Additional team personnel that were hired included Greg Beck, Ted Bitting, and Tim Wardrop. Fines against the team totaled $65,000, $50,000 for weight issues, and $15,000 for other technical issues. The team qualified last with a speed of 210.094 miles across four laps and were over 16 mph slower than pole speed. The Lotus engine manufactured by John Judd was underpowered and caused Alesi to have safety concerns. Lotus was given no extra engine boost for the race, and Alesi was black flagged for running 15 mph slower than the leaders, in violation of the 105 percent limit. The team finished nine laps and was scored last in 33rd place. Lazier Partners Racing purchased the chassis to compete with in the 2013 Indianapolis 500.

=== 2015 ===
On June 27, 2014, the team announced that it planned to compete full-time in the 2015 IndyCar Series season with driver Stefan Wilson. Sponsorship issues prevented the team from competing.

== Racing results ==
=== Complete IndyCar results ===
(key)

Year	Chassis	Engine	Drivers	no.	1	2	3	4	5	6	7	8	9	10	11	12	13	14	15	Pos.	Pts.
2012					STP	ALA	LBH	SAO	INDY	DET	TEX	MIL	IOW	TOR	EDM	MDO	SNM	BAL	FON		
2012	Dallara DW12	Lotus	(France) Jean Alesi R	64					33											34th	13
