= Jean Alesi =

French racing driver (born 1964)

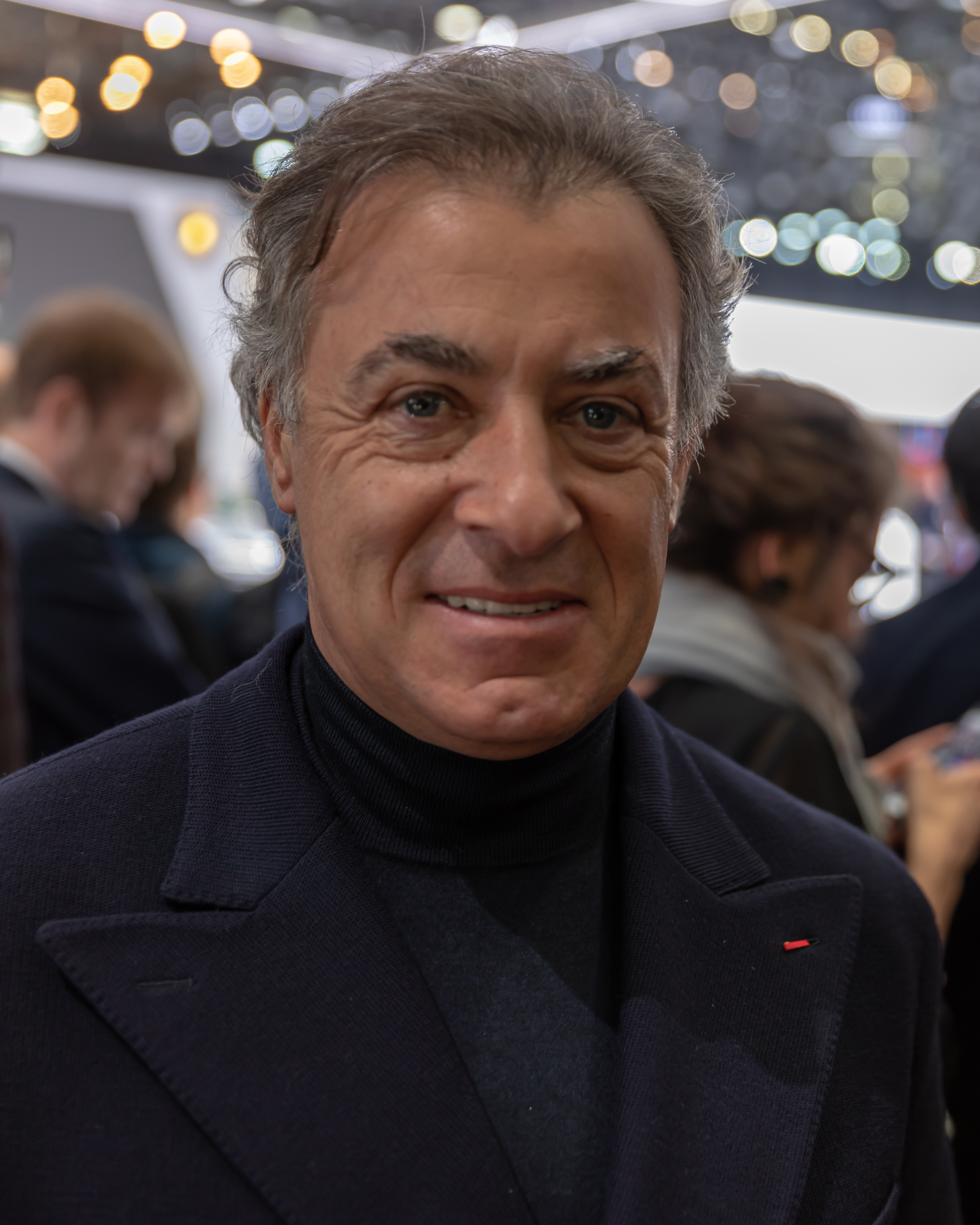
- Alesi in 2019
- Born: Giovanni Roberto Alesi; 11 June 1964 (age 62); Avignon, Vaucluse, France
- Spouses: Laurence Bahrfeld (m. 1992; div. 1995) Kumiko Goto (m. 1995; div. 2026) Anja (m. 2026)
- Children: 4, including Giuliano

Formula One World Championship career
- Nationality: (France) French
- Active years: 1989–2001
- Team(s): Tyrrell, Ferrari, Benetton, Sauber, Prost, Jordan
- Entries: 202 (201 starts)
- Championships: 0
- Wins: 1
- Podiums: 32
- Career points: 241
- Pole positions: 2
- Fastest laps: 4
- First entry: 1989 French Grand Prix
- First win: 1995 Canadian Grand Prix
- Last entry: 2001 Japanese Grand Prix

24 Hours of Le Mans career
- Years: 1989, 2010
- Teams: Schuppan, AF Corse
- Best finish: 16th (2010)
- Class wins: 0

IndyCar Series career
- 1 race run over 1 year
- Team: No. 64 (Fan Force United)
- First race: 2012 Indianapolis 500 (Indy)
Wins	Podiums	Poles
0	0	0

Deutsche Tourenwagen Masters career
- Years active: 2002–2006
- Teams: Persson, HWA
- Starts: 62
- Wins: 5
- Podiums: 8
- Poles: 3
- Fastest laps: 1
- Best finish: 5th in 2002, 2003

Awards
- 2006: Knight of the Legion of Honour

Jean Robert Alesi (French pronunciation: [ʒã a.lɛ.si]; born Giovanni Roberto Alesi, 11 June 1964) is a French former racing driver, who competed in Formula One from 1989 to 2001. Alesi won the 1995 Canadian Grand Prix with Ferrari.

Born and raised in Avignon, Alesi started karting aged 16 with a desire to eventually compete in rallying. He progressed to open-wheel racing at the age of twenty, winning the French Formula Three Championship in 1987 and graduating to International Formula 3000. His subsequent title with Jordan in 1989 led to a Formula One drive with Tyrrell, replacing Michele Alboreto from the 1989 French Grand Prix onwards, where he finished fourth. Alesi scored his maiden podium at the opening round of the 1990 season, repeating this feat in Monaco. He signed for Ferrari in 1991 to partner Alain Prost, scoring several podiums across five seasons before taking his sole victory at the Canadian Grand Prix in 1995. He left at the end of the season after twice finishing fifth in the standings, swapping seats with Michael Schumacher in 1996 to join Benetton, where he scored thirteen podiums across two seasons. He spent a further two seasons with Sauber—scoring his only podium for the team at the 1998 Belgian Grand Prix—before joining Prost. He remained at Prost until 2001, when he joined Jordan from the Hungarian Grand Prix onwards and retired at the conclusion of the season. During his time in Formula One, Alesi was noted for his ability in wet weather, as well as being a mercurial and passionate racer. Alesi holds the joint-record for most podium finishes before first win (fifteen).

After leaving Formula One, Alesi raced full-time in the Deutsche Tourenwagen Masters from 2002 to 2006, winning several races. Alesi then competed in the all-star Speedcar Series in both of its seasons, as well as entering the 24 Hours of Le Mans in 2010 and the Indianapolis 500 in 2012, before retiring from motor racing in 2012. Since 2013, he has been an ambassador for Pirelli. Alesi was appointed a Knight of the Legion of Honour in 2006.

== Early life and career ==
Alesi was born Giovanni Roberto Alesi on 11 June 1964 in the southern French town of Avignon to Sicilian parents. His father, Franco, was from Alcamo and his mother from Riesi. His father ran an automotive bodywork repair garage in the town, where Alesi spent much of his formative years and developed a love of cars. In addition to spending time in the family garage, Alesi's father also provided his first taste of motorsport, being a keen amateur competitor in rallying and hillclimb events. On weekends that he was unable to compete he would sometimes lend his rally cars to family friend and future Monte Carlo Rally-winning professional rally driver Jean Ragnotti, who would commonly return them "destroyed".

Starting his career with a passion for rallying rather than racing, Alesi took up karting at the age of sixteen and then graduated to cars in 1983 by entering the French Renault 5 Turbo championship, where he raced for two seasons. He won the 1987 French Formula 3 title before moving up to International Formula 3000 in 1988. The 1988 season was a disappointment, finishing tenth in the championship with two podium finishes, not helped by problems within the team. However, in 1989 he joined the Jordan Formula 3000 team and won the championship. Both crowns were after duels with his rival Érik Comas. In 1989, Alesi tied on points for the F3000 title with Comas, but won the title on number of wins, having scored three to Comas' two. After clinching the F3000 title, Alesi also made a one-off sportscar racing appearance, debuting the Ferrari F40 LM in the IMSA GT Championship round at Laguna Seca in October, between the Spanish and Japanese Grands Prix. He qualified second, led for six laps and finished third overall in the semi-factory car, behind the Audi 90s of Hans-Joachim Stuck and Hurley Haywood. He also raced in the Le Mans 24 hours in the same year, but a fire forced him to retire in the fourth hour of the race.

== Formula One career ==
=== Tyrrell (1989–1990) ===
While Alesi was seen as a talent of the future, his start as a Formula One driver was somewhat fortuitous. Prior to the 1989 French Grand Prix, Ken Tyrrell had signed a deal to run Camel cigarette sponsorship on his previously unsponsored cars. However, this caused problems for Michele Alboreto who was personally sponsored by rival cigarette brand Marlboro. The sponsorship clash forced Tyrrell to release Alboreto and find another driver. The team decided to look at whoever was leading International Formula 3000 at the time, and Alesi was signed as the replacement.

Alesi debuted in the 1989 French Grand Prix at Paul Ricard in a Tyrrell-Ford and finished fourth, having run as high as second during the race. Ken Tyrrell was sufficiently impressed to give him an eighteen-month contract. He drove most of the rest of the season for Tyrrell while continuing his successful Formula 3000 campaign, occasionally giving the car up in favour of Johnny Herbert when Formula 3000 clashed, scoring points again at the Italian and Spanish Grands Prix.

With Jonathan Palmer having retired from driving at the end of 1989 and a new teammate in Satoru Nakajima, Alesi amazingly became Tyrrell's lead driver in 1990 for what would be his first full year in Grand Prix racing (prior to the start of the 1990 season, Alesi only had eight race starts in Formula One). At the first event, the United States Grand Prix at Phoenix, he led for 25 laps in front of Ayrton Senna with a car powered by a customer Ford V8 considered as vastly inferior to the factory-developed Honda V10 in Senna's McLaren, and also re-passing Senna after the Brazilian had first overtaken for the lead, before ultimately finishing second. Second place in the Monaco Grand Prix followed, and by mid-season top teams were clamouring for his services in 1991. A confused situation erupted, with Tyrrell, Williams, and Ferrari all claiming to have signed the driver within a very short period. The results dropped away during the rest of the 1990 season, and Alesi finished ninth in the championship, with thirteen points.

There were signs of Alesi's talent in the Italian Grand Prix at Monza where he qualified the under powered Tyrrell in fifth place less than a second slower than Senna's pole time. At both the original and restart (caused by Derek Warwick's Lotus crashing heavily), Alesi passed the more powerful V12 Ferrari of reigning World Champion Alain Prost for third place and within a lap would be harrying McLaren's Gerhard Berger for second. On lap five, though, he spun into the barriers at the Rettifilo chicane.

=== Ferrari (1991–1995) ===
==== 1991 ====
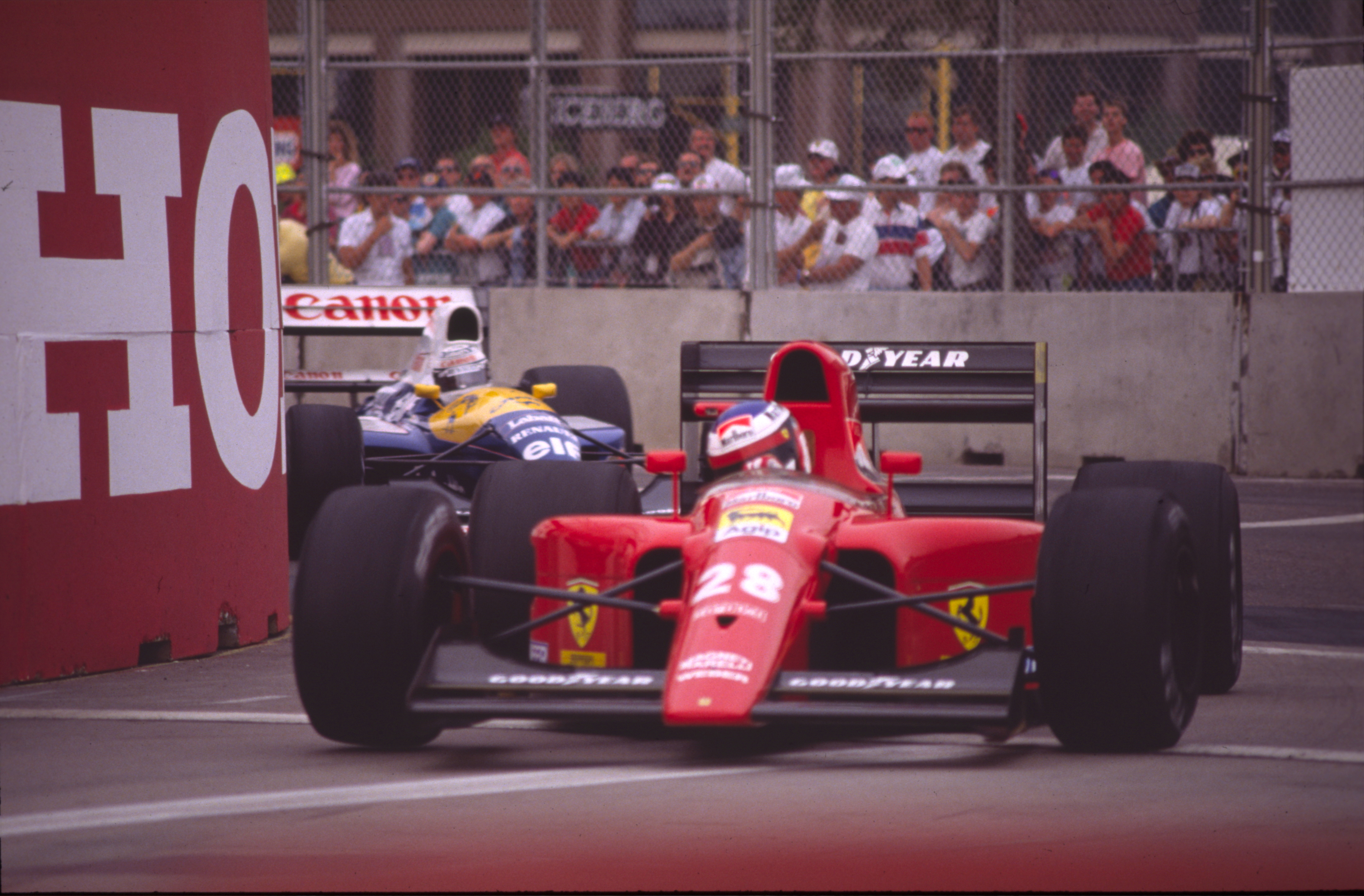
Alesi at the 1991 US GP, driving for Ferrari

Alesi initially signed a contract with Williams for the 1991 season. However due to Williams delaying the announcement of his signature with the reasoning eventually given they were pursuing Ayrton Senna, Alesi eventually grew tired of the constant delays, as a result he then opted instead to sign for Ferrari as the second driver alongside fellow countryman Alain Prost, and the Ferrari team had to pay Williams a fine of four million dollars. The move to Ferrari initially appeared to be a logical choice from a results perspective too, for Alain Prost had mounted a serious world championship challenge at Ferrari the previous year, and the 1991 Ferrari set good lap times in winter testing.

Alesi had third-place finishes at Monaco, Germany and Portugal, and finished in the top six at Brazil, France, Hungary and Spain (despite a stop and go penalty for a jump start in the Spanish Grand Prix). The 1991 Ferrari also turned out to be unreliable, and he had nine retirements during the season, including a mechanical failure while leading the Belgian Grand Prix. Having a dismal 1991 season, Alesi's teammate Prost was sacked after the Japanese Grand Prix when he publicly described the car as a "truck" and took a year-long sabbatical from racing, and thus Alesi became the team's number one driver for 1992. Alesi scored 21 points and finished seventh in the championship.

==== 1992 ====
Alesi was partnered by Ivan Capelli in 1992, when the Ferrari F92A was even further from the pace than the 1991 Ferrari. Capelli had a disastrous season and was replaced for the last two races by Nicola Larini. Alesi had no realistic hope of winning a race, and retired with engine failure in the first two races of the season, but he finished fourth in the third race of the season, behind the Williams drivers and Michael Schumacher. He finished third in the Spanish Grand Prix, after a strong wet-weather drive, in spite of making contact with Gerhard Berger and Mika Häkkinen during the race. He ran third at the San Marino Grand Prix, but retired following a collision with Gerhard Berger. The subsequent races brought a series of retirements, although Alesi had a strong third-place finish at Canada and produced another outstanding wet-weather drive in France, producing lap times on slicks that were comparable to those of Nigel Mansell's Williams, before retiring with another engine failure. In the Belgian Grand Prix he was given the F92A / T, an improvement over the previous model, but retired due to a collision with Nigel Mansell's Williams. He qualified a strong third at Monza, but retired with a fuel pump failure early in the race. He finished in the points during the last two races of the season, leaving him seventh in the championship with 18 points.

==== 1993 ====
Alesi was joined by Austrian Gerhard Berger in 1993 who was returning to Maranello after three seasons with McLaren. The Ferrari F93A was very slow during pre-season testing. Mainly due to the unreliability of the "active" suspension of the F93A, there came four retirements in the first five races of the season and an eighth-place finish at Brazil, causing Alesi to even consider leaving Ferrari. However, he finished third in the Monaco Grand Prix, and in July, he signed a further two-year contract with Ferrari. However, subsequent races continued to feature frequent retirements and finishes outside of the points. In Hungary, he had a collision with Christian Fittipaldi, resulting in a leg contusion, and came close to having a brawl with him afterwards. The Ferrari improved towards the end of the season, and Alesi finished second at Monza and then led early in the race at Portugal, eventually finishing fourth. Alesi finished sixth in the championship with sixteen points.

==== 1994 ====
In 1994, the Ferrari was far more competitive, but marred by unreliability, and team-mate Berger became established as the team leader. After finishing third in the first race of the season, Alesi injured his back after a testing accident at Mugello circuit in Italy after the first race of the 1994 season (Brazil) and was replaced in the Pacific Grand Prix and the San Marino Grand Prix by Nicola Larini. He returned with a fifth place in Monaco and finished a strong third in Canada, but almost lost the position at the end of the race due to a gearbox problem. He retired in the French Grand Prix due to a collision with Rubens Barrichello, but finished second in the British Grand Prix, thanks to the disqualification of Michael Schumacher, and was looking set for a strong result in the German Grand Prix, qualifying second behind team-mate Berger, but his engine failed on the first lap. Subsequent races were marked by a series of retirements. At Monza, he took his first pole position and led until his first pit stop, when his gearbox failed in the pitlane, and in anger, he drove back to Avignon at speeds in excess of 200 km/h. This streak finally ended at Japan, when he finished third after a duel with Nigel Mansell's Williams, and then he finished sixth at Australia. Alesi finished fifth in the championship with 24 points.

==== 1995: Maiden win ====
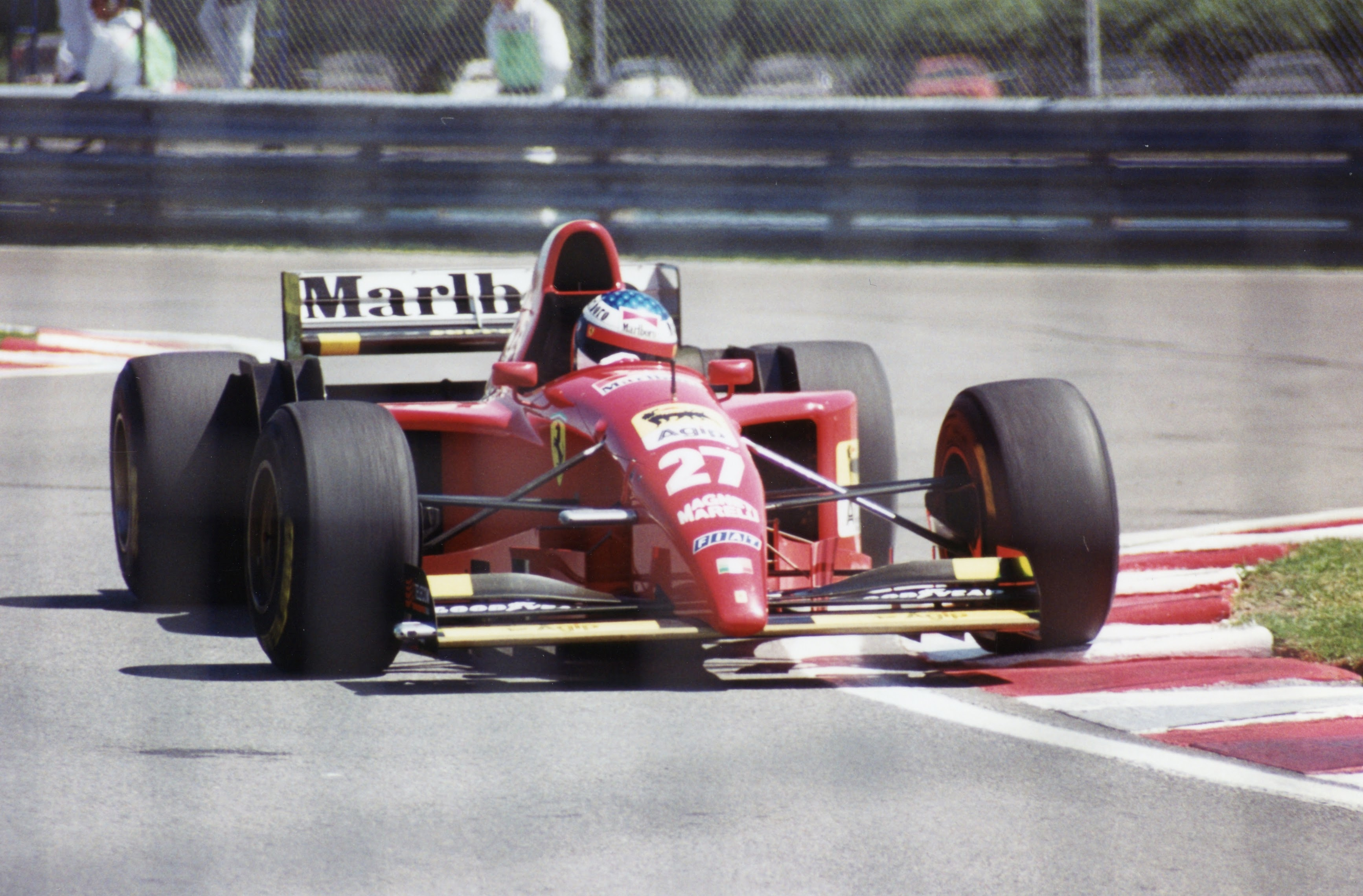
Jean Alesi took his only Grand Prix win at the 1995 Canadian Grand Prix in Montreal.

The Ferrari improved further in 1995 and Alesi achieved better results, although the pace of the Ferrari fell back during the second half of the season. He finished fifth at Brazil, followed by second places at Argentina and Imola. He retired from second place at the Spanish Grand Prix due to an engine failure, and at the Monaco Grand Prix, again while running second, Martin Brundle's Ligier spun in front of him, leaving him nowhere to go and causing him to crash. However, at the Canadian Grand Prix, on his 31st birthday, he won his first and only race, helped by Michael Schumacher encountering mechanical problems with ten laps to go. Alesi was unaware that he was in the lead for some time, as the mechanics didn't have enough time to put out his new position. Alesi realized what happened after he saw people getting up in the stands. Ferrari confirmed it with a P1 panel as he was passing through the pit lane. Overwhelmed by emotions, when Alesi was braking into Turn 1, he had tears in his eyes, making it difficult to drive in the right line. His Ferrari ran out of fuel after crossing the finish line and so got a lift back to the pits off Michael Schumacher. This broke the record for the largest number of consecutive races without a win for a Ferrari driver (67) which was subsequently exceeded by Felipe Massa in 2013. He finished second at the British Grand Prix, but then suffered four consecutive retirements, and was devastated prior to the Hungarian Grand Prix when hearing that he had lost his Ferrari drive to Michael Schumacher. He retired from the lead four laps into the Belgian Grand Prix due to a suspension failure, and retired from the lead again at the Italian Grand Prix, seven laps from the end, due to a rear wheel problem. He had a heated argument with Jean Todt after the Portuguese Grand Prix due to refusing to obey team orders to defer to team-mate Gerhard Berger in spite of having more points in the championship. At the European Grand Prix Alesi led for most of the race due to fast laps on slick tyres in damp conditions, but was passed by Michael Schumacher two laps from the end, hindered by low fuel and trouble progressing through lapped traffic. After a fifth place in the Pacific Grand Prix, he produced an outstanding wet-weather drive in Japan, making a powerful comeback after being angered by a stop-go penalty for a jump start that he felt he did not commit, but then retired with a driveshaft failure, and he crashed into Michael Schumacher in his final race for Ferrari at Australia. He finished fifth in the drivers' championship, with 42 points.

=== Benetton (1996–1997) ===
==== 1996 ====
When Benetton's Michael Schumacher joined Ferrari in 1996, Alesi and teammate Gerhard Berger swapped places with him, with Berger not happy to be the number two to Schumacher at Ferrari. Though Benetton were the defending constructors' champions, they were about to experience a lull in form like Ferrari in 1991. Many team personnel had decided to leave for Ferrari with Michael Schumacher, and chief designer Rory Byrne decided to take a year out. The 1996 Benetton was fairly successful but slower than the Williams, and lost competitiveness through the season, lacking effective developments to the car, while the Ferrari improved as the season progressed, resulting in Schumacher overtaking Alesi in the drivers' championship. His season began with a collision with the Ferrari of Eddie Irvine, but two podiums followed. After a bad start due to the car's braking system, he collided with Mika Salo in the fourth race of the season and he and team-mate Berger were summoned by team boss Flavio Briatore, and they were told, 'No more errors', and this generated tension within the team. After a sixth place at Imola, he was leading the Monaco Grand Prix but retired due to a broken suspension. He then had five podium finishes, sandwiching a retirement at the British Grand Prix after having run in second place. At the Italian Grand Prix, following the retirement of Damon Hill, he led until the pit stops, when he was overtaken by Michael Schumacher, who had a better race strategy. After a fourth place at Portugal and retirement in the last race, Alesi finished fourth in the drivers' championship with 47 points, the best result of his career.

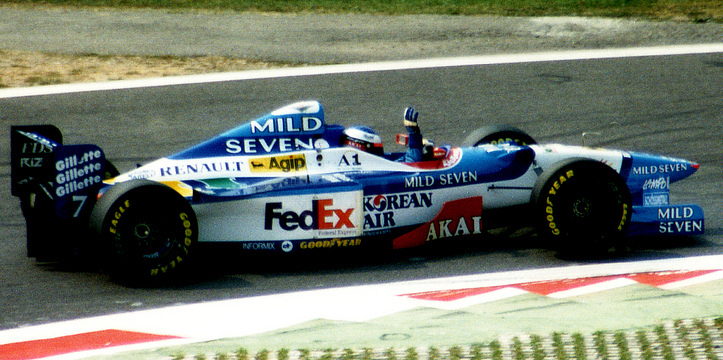
Alesi celebrating second place at the 1997 Italian Grand Prix.

==== 1997 ====
At the start of the 1997 season, Alesi was given an ultimatum from Flavio Briatore, warning him that 1997 would be his last chance to get good results. The car produced good results in pre-season testing, but Ross Brawn, Nigel Stepney and Rory Byrne joined Schumacher at Ferrari, and the Benetton's form during the season was erratic. His cause was not helped by an embarrassing retirement in the season-opening Australian Grand Prix in 1997 when he ignored several radio messages from the pit mechanics to come in for his pit stop, and continued for five laps until running out of fuel and was criticised by Briatore, who felt he had wasted a chance of a podium finish. He only scored three points in the following four races, but then had a strong run with some podiums, moving up into third place in the drivers' championship. However, there were further embarrassing incidents, such as at the French Grand Prix when he needlessly pushed David Coulthard off the track, and the Austrian Grand Prix, where his attempt to outbrake Eddie Irvine from nearly eight lengths behind caused a collision that saw Alesi placed under investigation for dangerous driving after the race. He took pole position at the Italian Grand Prix which sent the fans into raptures despite the fact that he no longer drove for Ferrari and led early in the race but lost out to David Coulthard's McLaren due to a slow pit stop. He finished fourth in the championship with 36 points, thanks to the disqualification of Michael Schumacher at the end of the season. Alesi's reputation was damaged during his spell at Benetton, having failed to win a Grand Prix despite having had a competitive car, and suffered by comparison with Schumacher at Ferrari. Alesi's contract with Benetton was not renewed at the end of the season and he signed a two-year contract with Sauber.

=== Sauber (1998–1999) ===
==== 1998 ====
Alesi moved on to the Swiss team Sauber, and was paired with Johnny Herbert and they went on to form the most experienced driver line-up for the 1998 season. The car was equipped with Ferrari engines from 1997, which were badged as Petronas. Although Alesi's results declined relative to previous years, his reputation improved again, for he put in many strong performances that masked the deficiencies of his Sauber. He had a poor first race of the season in Melbourne, which ended in an engine failure, and a ninth place in Brazil, but he showed good form in the 1998 Grand Prix of Argentina, finishing fifth despite a pit stop problem early in the race. He finished sixth at Imola, but then was plagued by unreliability during the middle part of the season, despite often running in points-scoring positions, including a retirement from fourth place near the end of the Monaco Grand Prix, and being hit by Heinz-Harald Frentzen while running in sixth during the French Grand Prix, and a hydraulic failure forced him to retire after running fourth during the British Grand Prix. He qualified on the front row at the Austrian Grand Prix, but a collision with Giancarlo Fisichella forced him to retire. He achieved the last podium of his career at the rain-soaked Belgian Grand Prix, behind the Jordans of Damon Hill and Ralf Schumacher. He also scored points at the Italian Grand Prix, and finished in eleventh place in the drivers' championship with nine points, comprehensively beating team-mate Johnny Herbert.

==== 1999 ====
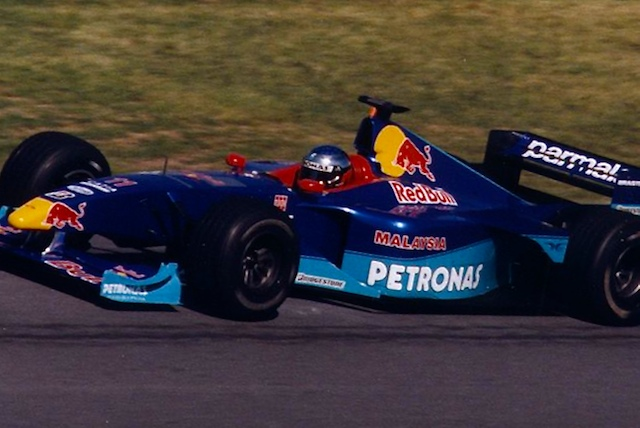
Alesi driving for Sauber at the 1999 Canadian Grand Prix.

The 1999 Sauber was slower and less reliable than the previous year's, and Alesi had to retire immediately in the first Grand Prix of the season, and also retired in the Brazilian Grand Prix, albeit after having worked his way up to fifth position from 21st on the grid. His first points came in the third race of the season, with a sixth place finish. At the Canadian Grand Prix he was angered by an incident with Jarno Trulli and, despite the good relationship between the two drivers, accused Trulli of not behaving as a professional driver. He had several other retirements following some good qualifying performances including a front row position at the French Grand Prix, thanks to a wet qualifying session. During the summer, he was named as a possible replacement for Eddie Irvine as the number two Ferrari driver alongside Michael Schumacher, and Schumacher said that he would be happy to have Alesi in the team. Ferrari opted to sign Rubens Barrichello for the second seat, closing the door on a possible return for Alesi. Eventually, he signed for Prost Grand Prix and accused the engineers of Sauber of not developing the car or following the advice of the drivers. Shortly before the Hungarian Grand Prix, Alesi had an accident that caused bruises to his right leg and almost caused him to miss the race, but he did take part. He had another sixth place at the last race of the season, leaving him sixteenth in the championship with two points.

=== Prost and Jordan (2000–2001) ===
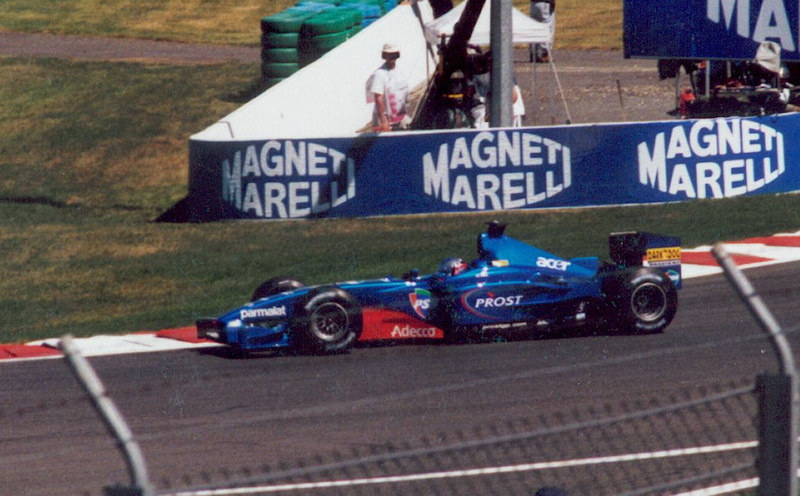
Alesi driving for Prost at the 2001 French Grand Prix.

For the 2000 season, Alesi moved on to join Prost, which was owned by his former Ferrari teammate and four time World Drivers' Champion Alain Prost, after Prost had bought the Ligier team in early 1997 and renamed it. However, the car was very slow and unreliable. He was hit by a billboard in qualifying for the Brazilian Grand Prix, resulting in an accident, but came out unscathed. He failed to score a single point during the season, for the first time in his career. Late in the season, he criticised the car and the Peugeot engines, so much so that in the French Grand Prix, the technicians of the Transalpine went on strike for five minutes. A bad accident in the German Grand Prix threatened his ability to race at the subsequent Grand Prix in Hungary, but he was able to take part.

In 2001, the Prost car was reliable and he finished every race that he drove for the Prost team. He got into a points-scoring position at the wet Brazilian Grand Prix but his tyres went off and consequently he dropped to eighth place. Alesi scored his first points since the 1999 season at the Monaco Grand Prix, with a sixth place. He then finished fifth at the Canadian Grand Prix and celebrated by performing some donuts and tossing his helmet into the crowd. A dispute after the British Grand Prix, however, saw Alesi walk out after the German Grand Prix, where he scored a point. This was because German driver Heinz-Harald Frentzen was suddenly sacked by Jordan after the British Grand Prix and needed a drive. He joined the Prost team, and Alesi joined Jordan. Alesi was fined and criticised by Prost, who had given him a two-year contract and did not want to lose his number one driver.

Alesi first raced for Prost in 2001. Alesi ended his open-wheel career in 2001 with Jordan. Alesi had driven for Jordan in Formula 3000 when he won the championship in 1989. He drove the remaining five races of 2001 for Jordan, scoring his last Formula One points in Belgium by finishing sixth. Alesi made his two-hundredth Formula One start in 2001 United States Grand Prix and finished his F1 career at the 2001 Japanese Grand Prix, where he retired after colliding with Kimi Räikkönen on lap five. However, he was generally outpaced by team-mate Jarno Trulli, and the team opted to take on Takuma Sato instead for 2002. Although Alesi was offered a drive with Arrows, he did not want to race for another season in an uncompetitive car, and so decided to retire from Formula One.

== Later career ==
=== Deutsche Tourenwagen Masters (2002–2006) ===
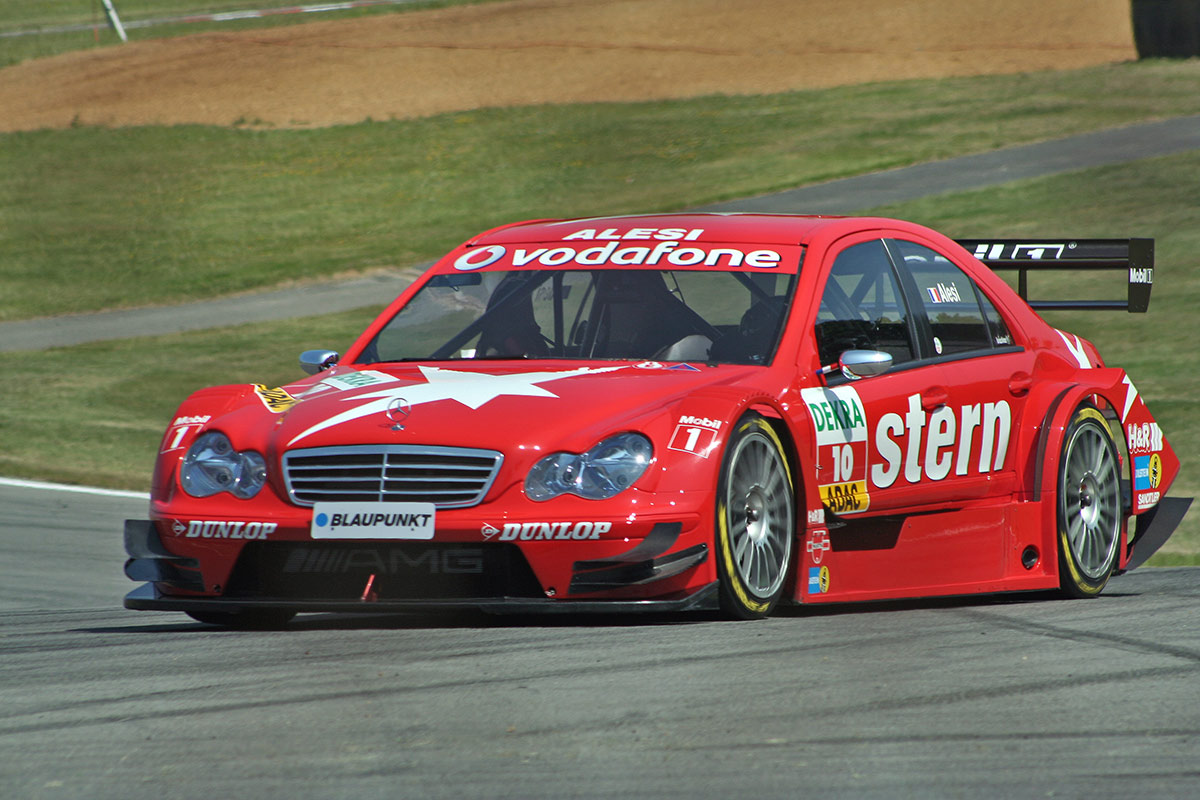
Alesi driving for Mercedes-Benz (Persson Motorsport) in the 2006 DTM season.

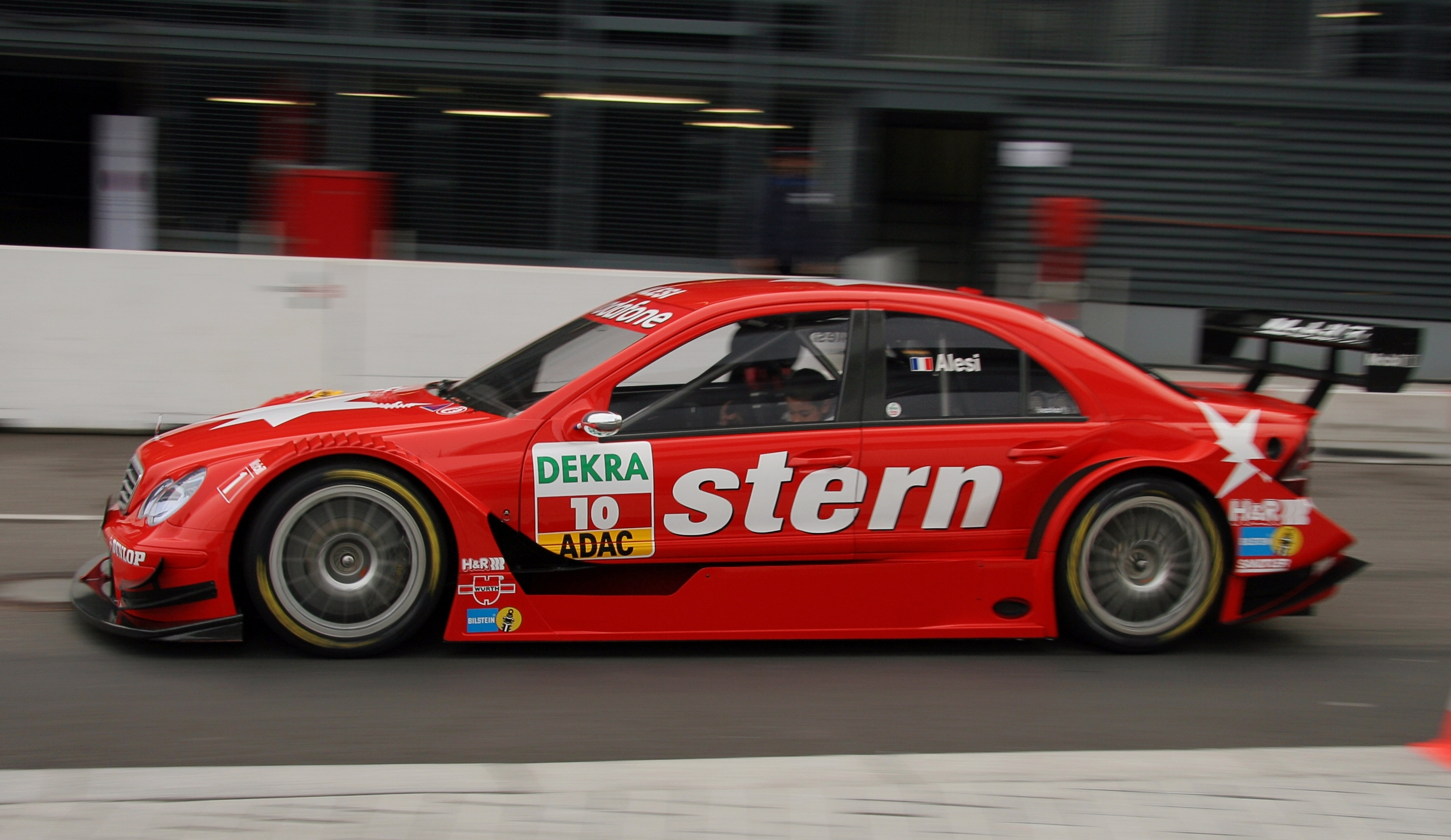
Alesi in his 2006 DTM-Mercedes racecar

In March 2002, Alesi, who was set to drive for Mercedes that season in DTM, was recruited by McLaren to work on tyre development, managing 224 laps over three days at Paul Ricard in a 2001-spec McLaren-Mercedes MP4-16B, before staying on to have a run in his new Merc CLK-DTM racer.

Alesi tested again for McLaren at Mugello in April that same year, putting ninety laps on the board, and was in discussions to become the team's official test driver. It never happened, with Alesi going on to spend five seasons in the DTM with Mercedes instead, and later holding F1-related ambassadorial roles with both Lotus and Pirelli.

=== DTM 2002–2006 ===
After Formula One, Alesi raced in the German Touring Car Championship, where he placed fifth in the 2002 championship for Mercedes with one victory. He repeated this in 2003 but this time scoring two victories. In 2004, he finished seventh in the championship scoring no victories. In 2005, he won the opening race and went on to take seventh place in the standings once more. He retired from the DTM after finishing the 2006 season in ninth place.

=== Speedcar Series (2008–2009) ===
Alesi joined a number of other ex-Formula One drivers (Christian Danner, Johnny Herbert, Stefan Johansson, Ukyo Katayama, JJ Lehto, Gianni Morbidelli, Jacques Villeneuve and Alex Yoong) in the inaugural season of the Far & Middle Eastern Speedcar Series. He won two races and finished fourth in the championship. He finished fifth in the second and last season of Speedcar Series after taking two wins in 2009.

=== Le Mans Series (2010) ===
On 13 October 2009, Alesi tested an AF Corse Ferrari F430 GT2 at Maranello, on the same day that Felipe Massa drove an F1 car for the first time after his accident in Hungary earlier in the year. After the test, which lasted just 65 laps, Alesi was enthusiastic and Amato Ferrari talked about Alesi's possible involvement in the 2010 programme.

Early in 2010, it was announced that Alesi would be the team-mate of another ex-F1 Ferrari driver, Giancarlo Fisichella, in the Le Mans Series GT2 class in Ferrari's AF Corse team. In the first two races, Alesi and his team-mates Fisichella and Finn Toni Vilander finished on the podium. Alesi, Fisichella and Vilander raced in the Le Mans 24 h race for AF Corse and finished fourth in their class. In the third race of the season in Algarve the trio finished in second position and at the Hungaroring they finished in fourth place. They finished second in the championship.

=== Indianapolis 500 (2012) ===
In April 2012, Alesi announced his intent to race in the 2012 Indianapolis 500 with a Lotus engine. Deals with former IZOD IndyCar Series team Newman/Haas Racing fell through, and HVM Racing owner Keith Wiggins said that his team didn't have the funding to run Alesi in the 500. However, Firestone Indy Lights team Fan Force United agreed to field Alesi in the 500 where he qualified 33rd. His Lotus-powered car, along with that of fellow Lotus driver Simona de Silvestro, was so severely underpowered as to be unable to maintain sufficient pace in the race, and both were forced to park their cars after less than a dozen completed laps.

On 18 December 2012, Alesi unofficially announced his intention to quit racing when, in an interview with L'Equipe, he conceded that for next year he had given up on finding the sponsorship required for a second attempt.

== Driver profile ==
=== Driving style ===
During his spell at Ferrari from 1991 to 1995, Alesi's aggressive driving style, combined with the use of the number 27 on his car, led to comparisons with Gilles Villeneuve.

=== Helmet ===
Alesi's helmet is white with black and red lines going down on the front side of the helmet with his name written, being an homage to Elio de Angelis, in addition to a deep blue top section. In 1999, his helmet changed from white to silver, owing to one of Sauber's sponsors being Red Bull.

== Other ventures ==
Alesi made a cameo appearance as himself in the 2001 movie Driven, a film based around the CART IndyCar/ChampCar racing.

Alesi was an active spokesman for the Direxiv team in their bid for entry to the 2008 Formula 1 series. It was planned as a McLaren B Team with backing and engines from Mercedes. However, the proposal was beaten to the final grid place by Prodrive.

In January 2011, along with the launch of their new car, Lotus Renault GP announced that they had hired Alesi as an ambassador for the team and test driver for the T125 single-seater project. In September, Alesi announced that he will attempt to qualify for the 2012 Indianapolis 500, in a car powered by a Lotus-badged engine. On an episode during season 17 of the BBC TV show Top Gear, Alesi helped presenter Jeremy Clarkson test one of the Lotus T125 single seaters.

In 2013, Alesi became an ambassador for Pirelli.

== Personal life ==
Alesi was married to Laurence Bahrfeld, with whom he has a daughter Charlotte. He then married Kumiko Goto, a Japanese model, actress, and former pop singer in 1995. They have three children, daughter Helena and sons Giuliano and John. The couple divorced in June 2026. He later remarried to a woman named Anja. Giuliano Alesi is now also a racing driver, having competed in the 2019 FIA Formula 2 Championship with Trident Racing. Helena Alesi made her debut at 2017's Le Bal des Débutantes.

Alesi is a wine connoisseur and has a vineyard near his hometown of Avignon, where he resides with his wife and children. He is a fan of Italian football team Juventus.

Alesi legally changed his name to Jean Robert Alesi in 2005.

In 2006, Alesi was awarded Knight in France's Legion of Honour.

== Racing record ==
=== Career summary ===
Season	Series	Team	Races	Wins	Poles	F/Laps	Podiums	Points	Position
1983	Renault 5 Turbo Cup France	?	?	1	?	?	1	?	7th
1984	French Formula Renault	?	?	?	?	?	?	25	10th
1985	French Formula Renault	?	?	?	?	?	5	64	5th
1986	French Formula Three Championship	José Alesi	11	2	3	2	7	78	2nd
1987	French Formula Three Championship	Oreca	13	7	5	3	10	144	**1st**
1988	International Formula 3000	Oreca	11	0	0	0	1	11	10th
1989	International Formula 3000	Eddie Jordan Racing	9	3	2	1	4	39	**1st**
1989	Formula One	Tyrrell Racing Organisation	8	0	0	0	0	8	9th
1989	Japanese Formula 3000	Team Kygnus Tonen	2	0	0	0	0	0	NC
1989	24 Hours of Le Mans	Team Schuppan	1	0	0	0	0	N/A	DNF
1989	IMSA GTO	Ferrari France / Jean Sage	1	0	0	0	1	12	25th
1990	Formula One	Tyrrell Racing Organisation	15	0	0	0	2	13	9th
1991	Formula One	Scuderia Ferrari	16	0	0	1	3	21	7th
1992	Formula One	Scuderia Ferrari	16	0	0	0	2	18	7th
1993	Formula One	Scuderia Ferrari	16	0	0	0	2	16	6th
1994	Formula One	Scuderia Ferrari	14	0	1	0	4	24	5th
1995	Formula One	Scuderia Ferrari	17	1	0	1	5	42	5th
1996	Formula One	Mild Seven Benetton Renault	16	0	0	2	8	47	4th
1997	Formula One	Mild Seven Benetton Renault	17	0	1	0	5	36	4th
1998	Formula One	Red Bull Sauber Petronas	16	0	0	0	1	9	11th
1999	Formula One	Red Bull Sauber Petronas	16	0	0	0	0	2	15th
2000	Formula One	Gauloises Prost Peugeot	16	0	0	0	0	0	NC
2001	Formula One	Prost Acer	12	0	0	0	0	5	15th
2001	Formula One	B&H Jordan Honda	5	0	0	0	0	5	15th
2002	Deutsche Tourenwagen Masters	HWA Team	20	2	1	1	4	24	5th
2003	Deutsche Tourenwagen Masters	HWA Team	10	2	0	0	2	42	5th
2004	Deutsche Tourenwagen Masters	HWA Team	10	0	2	0	1	19	7th
2005	Deutsche Tourenwagen Masters	HWA Team	11	1	0	0	1	22	7th
2006	Deutsche Tourenwagen Masters	Persson Motorsport	10	0	0	0	0	15	9th
2008	Speedcar Series	Speedcar Team	8	2	1	1	5	40	4th
2008-09	Speedcar Series	HPR	9	3	0	1	3	38	5th
2010	Le Mans Series - GT2	AF Corse	5	0	0	?	3	66	**2nd**
2010	24 Hours of Le Mans	AF Corse	1	0	0	0	0	N/A	16th
2012	IndyCar Series	Fan Force United	1	0	0	0	0	13	34th
2021	Historic Grand Prix of Monaco - Series F	Scuderia Ferrari	1	0	0	1	0	N/A	10th

=== Complete International Formula 3000 results ===
(key) (Races in bold indicate pole position) (Races in italics indicate fastest lap)

Year	Entrant	Chassis	Engine	Tyres	1	2	3	4	5	6	7	8	9	10	11	DC	Points
1988	Oreca	March 87B	Ford Cosworth	A	JER; 11	VAL; 9										10th	11
1988	Oreca	Reynard 88D	Ford Cosworth	A			PAU; 2	SIL; 5	MNZ; Ret	PER; 6	BRH; Ret	BIR; Ret	BUG; Ret	ZOL; 9	DIJ; 5	10th	11
1989	Eddie Jordan Racing	Reynard 89D	Mugen Honda	A	SIL; 4	VAL; Ret	PAU; 1	JER; 5	**PER**; Ret	BRH; 2	**BIR**; 1	SPA; 1	BUG; 6	DIJ		**1st***	**39**

* – Alesi won the 1989 title on countback, winning three races to Érik Comas' two.

=== Complete Japanese Formula 3000 results ===
(key) (Races in bold indicate pole position; races in italics indicate fastest lap)

Year	Entrant	1	2	3	4	5	6	7	8	DC	Points
1989	Team Kygnus Tonen	SUZ; Ret	FUJ; Ret	MIN	SUZ	SUG	FUJ	SUZ	SUZ	NC	0

=== Complete Formula One results ===
(key) (Races in bold indicate pole position; races in italics indicate fastest lap)

Year	Team	Chassis	Engine	1	2	3	4	5	6	7	8	9	10	11	12	13	14	15	16	17	WDC	Points
1989	Tyrrell Racing Organisation	Tyrrell 018	Ford-Cosworth DFR V8	BRA	SMR	MON	MEX	USA	CAN	FRA; 4	GBR; Ret	GER; 10	HUN; 9	BEL	ITA; 5	POR	ESP; 4	JPN; Ret	AUS; Ret		9th	8
1990	Tyrrell Racing Organisation	Tyrrell 018	Ford-Cosworth DFR V8	USA; 2	BRA; 7																9th	13
1990	Tyrrell Racing Organisation	Tyrrell 019	Ford-Cosworth DFR V8			SMR; 6	MON; 2	CAN; Ret	MEX; 7	FRA; Ret	GBR; 8	GER; 11	HUN; Ret	BEL; 8	ITA; Ret	POR; 8	ESP; Ret	JPN; DNS	AUS; 8		9th	13
1991	Scuderia Ferrari SpA	Ferrari 642/2	Ferrari 037/291 V12	USA; 12†	BRA; 6	SMR; Ret	MON; 3	CAN; Ret													7th	21
1991	Scuderia Ferrari SpA	Ferrari 643	Ferrari 037/291 V12						MEX; Ret	FRA; 4	GBR; Ret	GER; 3	HUN; 5	BEL; Ret	ITA; Ret	POR; 3	ESP; 4	JPN; Ret	AUS; Ret		7th	21
1992	Scuderia Ferrari SpA	Ferrari F92A	Ferrari 038 V12	RSA; Ret	MEX; Ret	BRA; 4	ESP; 3	SMR; Ret	MON; Ret	CAN; 3	FRA; Ret	GBR; Ret	GER; 5	HUN; Ret							7th	18
1992	Scuderia Ferrari SpA	Ferrari F92AT	Ferrari 038 V12												BEL; Ret	ITA; Ret	POR; Ret	JPN; 5	AUS; 4		7th	18
1993	Scuderia Ferrari	Ferrari F93A	Ferrari 041 V12	RSA; Ret	BRA; 8	EUR; Ret	SMR; Ret	ESP; Ret	MON; 3	CAN; Ret	FRA; Ret	GBR; 9	GER; 7	HUN; Ret	BEL; Ret	ITA; 2	POR; 4	JPN; Ret	AUS; 4		6th	16
1994	Scuderia Ferrari	Ferrari 412T1	Ferrari 041/043 V12	BRA; 3	PAC	SMR	MON; 5	ESP; 4	CAN; 3												5th	24
1994	Scuderia Ferrari	Ferrari 412T1B	Ferrari 041/043 V12							FRA; Ret	GBR; 2	GER; Ret	HUN; Ret	BEL; Ret	**ITA**; Ret	POR; Ret	EUR; 10	JPN; 3	AUS; 6		5th	24
1995	Scuderia Ferrari	Ferrari 412T2	Ferrari 044/1 V12	BRA; 5	ARG; 2	SMR; 2	ESP; Ret	MON; Ret	CAN; 1	FRA; 5	GBR; 2	GER; Ret	HUN; Ret	BEL; Ret	ITA; Ret	POR; 5	EUR; 2	PAC; 5	JPN; Ret	AUS; Ret	5th	42
1996	Mild Seven Benetton Renault	Benetton B196	Renault RS8 V10	AUS; Ret	BRA; 2	ARG; 3	EUR; Ret	SMR; 6	MON; Ret	ESP; 2	CAN; 3	FRA; 3	GBR; Ret	GER; 2	HUN; 3	BEL; 4	ITA; 2	POR; 4	JPN; Ret		4th	47
1997	Mild Seven Benetton Renault	Benetton B197	Renault RS9 V10	AUS; Ret	BRA; 6	ARG; 7	SMR; 5	MON; Ret	ESP; 3	CAN; 2	FRA; 5	GBR; 2	GER; 6	HUN; 11	BEL; 8	**ITA**; 2	AUT; Ret	LUX; 2	JPN; 5	EUR; 13	4th	36
1998	Red Bull Sauber Petronas	Sauber C17	Petronas SPE-01D V10	AUS; Ret	BRA; 9	ARG; 5	SMR; 6	ESP; 10	MON; 12	CAN; Ret	FRA; 7	GBR; Ret	AUT; Ret	GER; 10	HUN; 7	BEL; 3	ITA; 5	LUX; 10	JPN; 7		11th	9
1999	Red Bull Sauber Petronas	Sauber C18	Petronas SPE-03A V10	AUS; Ret	BRA; Ret	SMR; 6	MON; Ret	ESP; Ret	CAN; Ret	FRA; Ret	GBR; 14	AUT; Ret	GER; 8	HUN; 16†	BEL; 9	ITA; 9	EUR; Ret	MAL; 7	JPN; 6		15th	2
2000	Gauloises Prost Peugeot	Prost AP03	Peugeot A20 V10	AUS; Ret	BRA; Ret	SMR; Ret	GBR; 10	ESP; Ret	EUR; 9	MON; Ret	CAN; Ret	FRA; 14	AUT; Ret	GER; Ret	HUN; Ret	BEL; Ret	ITA; 12	USA; Ret	JPN; Ret	MAL; 11	NC	0
2001	Prost Acer	Prost AP04	Acer V10	AUS; 9	MAL; 9	BRA; 8	SMR; 9	ESP; 10	AUT; 10	MON; 6	CAN; 5	EUR; 15†	FRA; 12	GBR; 11	GER; 6						15th	5
2001	B&H Jordan Honda	Jordan EJ11	Honda RA001E V10													HUN; 10	BEL; 6	ITA; 8	USA; 7	JPN; Ret	15th	5

† Driver did not finish the race, but were still classified as they had completed at least 90% of the race distance.

=== 24 Hours of Le Mans results ===
Year	Team	Co-Drivers	Car	Class	Laps	Pos.	Class Pos.
1989	(Australia) Team Schuppan	(United Kingdom) Will Hoy (United States) Dominic Dobson	Porsche 962C	C1	69	DNF	DNF
2010	(Italy) AF Corse	(Italy) Giancarlo Fisichella (Finland) Toni Vilander	Ferrari F430 GT2	GT2	323	16th	4th

=== Complete Deutsche Tourenwagen Masters results ===
(key) (Races in bold indicate pole position) (Races in italics indicate fastest lap)

Year	Team	Car	1	2	3	4	5	6	7	8	9	10	11	12	13	14	15	16	17	18	19	20	DC	Points
2002	HWA Team	AMG-Mercedes CLK-DTM	HOC; QR; 8	HOC; CR; 3	ZOL; QR; 9	ZOL; CR; 10	DON; QR; 1	**DON**; **CR**; 1	SAC; QR; 16	SAC; CR; Ret	NOR; QR; 5	NOR; CR; 4	LAU; QR; 14	LAU; CR; 8	NÜR; QR; 11	NÜR; CR; Ret	A1R; QR; 4	A1R; CR; 3	ZAN; QR; 14	ZAN; CR; 8	HOC; QR; Ret	HOC; CR; Ret	5th	24
2003	HWA Team	AMG-Mercedes CLK 2003	HOC; 4	ADR; 7	NÜR; Ret	LAU; 5	NOR; 5	DON; 1	NÜR; 6	A1R; Ret	ZAN; 5	HOC; 1											5th	42
2004	HWA Team	AMG-Mercedes C-Klasse 2004	**HOC**; Ret	EST; 7	ADR; 3	LAU; 5	**NOR**; 10	SHA^{1} 4	NÜR; 7	OSC; 10	ZAN; 11	BRN; 8	HOC; 5										7th	19
2005	HWA Team	AMG-Mercedes C-Klasse 2005	HOC; 1	LAU; 7	SPA; 4	BRN; 9	OSC; 13	NOR; Ret	NÜR; 7	ZAN; Ret	LAU; 8	IST; 7	HOC; 13										7th	22
2006	Persson Motorsport	AMG-Mercedes C-Klasse 2005	HOC; 6	LAU; 7	OSC; 8	BRH; 6	NOR; Ret	NÜR; 4	ZAN; Ret	CAT; 14	BUG; 11	HOC; 8											9th	15

^{1} - Shanghai was a non-championship round.

=== Complete American open-wheel racing results ===
(key)

==== IndyCar Series ====
Year	Team	Chassis	No.	Engine	1	2	3	4	5	6	7	8	9	10	11	12	13	14	15	Rank	Points	Ref
2012	Fan Force United	Dallara DW12	64	Lotus	STP	ALA	LBH	SAO	INDY; 33	DET	TXS	MIL	IOW	TOR	EDM	MDO	SNM	BAL	FON	34th	13	

==== Indianapolis 500 ====
Year	Chassis	Engine	Start	Finish	Team
2012	Dallara	Lotus	33	33	Fan Force United

== See also ==
- Formula One drivers from France

Sporting positions
Preceded by Yannick Dalmas	French Formula 3 Championship; Champion; 1987	Succeeded by Érik Comas
Preceded by Roberto Moreno	International Formula 3000; Champion; 1989	Succeeded by Érik Comas
Preceded by Cristiano da Matta; Fonsi Nieto; Gilles Panizzi	Race of Champions; Nations' Cup; 2004; With: Sébastien Loeb	Succeeded by Mattias Ekström; Tom Kristensen
Awards and achievements
Preceded by Ayrton Senna	Autosport; International Racing Driver Award; 1989	Succeeded by Ayrton Senna
