= 2014 Brickyard 400 =

2014 Crown Royal Presents the John Wayne Walding 400 at the Brickyard
Race details
- Race 20 of 36 in the 2014 NASCAR Sprint Cup Series
- The 2014 Brickyard 400 program cover, celebrating the 20th Brickyard 400.
- Date: July 27, 2014
- Location: Indianapolis Motor Speedway, Speedway, Indiana
- Course: Permanent racing facility
- Course length: 2.5 miles (4.023 km)
- Distance: 160 laps, 400 mi (643.737 km)
- Weather: Partly cloudy with temperatures up to 78 °F (26 °C) and winds out of the west at 12 miles per hour (19 km/h)
- Average speed: 150.297 mph (241.880 km/h)

Pole position
Driver	Kevin Harvick	Stewart–Haas Racing
- Time: 47.753

Most laps led
Driver	Kasey Kahne	Hendrick Motorsports
- Laps: 70

Winner
No. 24	Jeff Gordon	Hendrick Motorsports

Television in the United States
- Network: ESPN & IMS Radio Network
- Announcers: Allen Bestwick, Dale Jarrett and Andy Petree (Television); Doug Rice and John Andretti (Booth); Jerry Baker (1), Jake Query (2), Mark Jaynes (3) and Kevin Lee (4) (Turns) (Radio)
- Nielsen ratings: 3.4/7 (Final); 3.2/7 (Overnight); 5.2 Million viewers

The 2014 Crown Royal Presents the John Wayne Walding 400 at the Brickyard Powered by BigMachineRecords.com, the 21st running of the event, was a NASCAR Sprint Cup Series stock car race that was held on July 27, 2014, at the Indianapolis Motor Speedway in Speedway, Indiana. Contested over 160 laps, it was the 20th race of the 2014 NASCAR Sprint Cup Series season. Twenty years after he won the inaugural race, Jeff Gordon of Hendrick Motorsports took the lead on the final restart and drove away from the field for his 90th career victory and a record-breaking fifth win at Indianapolis. Kyle Busch finished second, while Denny Hamlin, Matt Kenseth and Joey Logano rounded out the top five. The top rookies of the race were Kyle Larson (7th), Austin Dillon (10th), and Justin Allgaier (27th).

== Report ==
=== Entry list ===
The entry list was released on Tuesday, July 22, 2014, at 10:26 a.m. Eastern time. Forty-six drivers were entered for the race.

No.	Driver	Team	Manufacturer
1	Jamie McMurray (W)	Chip Ganassi Racing	Chevrolet
2	Brad Keselowski (PC2)	Team Penske	Ford
3	Austin Dillon (R)	Richard Childress Racing	Chevrolet
4	Kevin Harvick (W)	Stewart–Haas Racing	Chevrolet
5	Kasey Kahne	Hendrick Motorsports	Chevrolet
7	Michael Annett (R)	Tommy Baldwin Racing	Chevrolet
9	Marcos Ambrose	Richard Petty Motorsports	Ford
10	Danica Patrick	Stewart–Haas Racing	Chevrolet
11	Denny Hamlin	Joe Gibbs Racing	Toyota
12	Juan Pablo Montoya	Team Penske	Ford
13	Casey Mears	Germain Racing	Chevrolet
14	Tony Stewart (PC3) (W)	Stewart–Haas Racing	Chevrolet
15	Clint Bowyer	Michael Waltrip Racing	Toyota
16	Greg Biffle	Roush Fenway Racing	Ford
17	Ricky Stenhouse Jr.	Roush Fenway Racing	Ford
18	Kyle Busch	Joe Gibbs Racing	Toyota
20	Matt Kenseth (PC5)	Joe Gibbs Racing	Toyota
21	Trevor Bayne (i)	Wood Brothers Racing	Ford
22	Joey Logano	Team Penske	Ford
23	Alex Bowman (R)	BK Racing	Toyota
24	Jeff Gordon (PC6) (W)	Hendrick Motorsports	Chevrolet
26	Cole Whitt (R)	BK Racing	Toyota
27	Paul Menard (W)	Richard Childress Racing	Chevrolet
29	Matt Crafton (i)	RAB Racing	Toyota
31	Ryan Newman (W)	Richard Childress Racing	Chevrolet
32	Travis Kvapil	Go FAS Racing	Ford
33	David Stremme	Hillman-Circle Sport LLC	Chevrolet
34	David Ragan	Front Row Motorsports	Ford
36	Reed Sorenson	Tommy Baldwin Racing	Chevrolet
37	Bobby Labonte (PC7) (W)	Tommy Baldwin Racing	Chevrolet
38	David Gilliland	Front Row Motorsports	Ford
40	Landon Cassill (i)	Hillman-Circle Sport LLC	Chevrolet
41	Kurt Busch (PC4)	Stewart–Haas Racing	Chevrolet
42	Kyle Larson (R)	Chip Ganassi Racing	Chevrolet
43	Aric Almirola	Richard Petty Motorsports	Ford
47	A. J. Allmendinger	JTG Daugherty Racing	Chevrolet
48	Jimmie Johnson (PC1) (W)	Hendrick Motorsports	Chevrolet
51	Justin Allgaier (R)	HScott Motorsports	Chevrolet
55	Brian Vickers	Michael Waltrip Racing	Toyota
66	Brett Moffitt	Identity Ventures Racing	Toyota
78	Martin Truex Jr.	Furniture Row Racing	Chevrolet
83	Ryan Truex (R)	BK Racing	Toyota
88	Dale Earnhardt Jr.	Hendrick Motorsports	Chevrolet
95	Michael McDowell	Leavine Family Racing	Ford
98	Josh Wise	Phil Parsons Racing	Chevrolet
99	Carl Edwards	Roush Fenway Racing	Ford
Official entry list

Key	Meaning
(R)	Rookie
(i)	Ineligible for points
(PC#)	Past champions provisional
(W)	Past winner of event

2013 NASCAR Camping World Truck Series champion Matt Crafton entered the race in the No. 29 RAB Racing Toyota, attempting to make his Cup debut. IndyCar Series driver and former Cup driver Juan Pablo Montoya returned to NASCAR in the No. 12 Team Penske Ford to make his second start of the season. 2000 Brickyard 400 winner Bobby Labonte entered the race in the No. 37 Tommy Baldwin Racing Chevrolet. Crafton, Montoya, and Trevor Bayne were required to make the race via speed, due to having no owners' championship points or being too low in owners' points, while Labonte had the advantage of using a past champion's provisional.

== Practice ==
Two practice sessions were held at the track, on Friday at 11:35 am local time, and on Saturday at 9 am, three hours before the qualifying session.

=== First practice ===
Matt Kenseth was the fastest in the first practice session with a time of 48.313 and a speed of 186.285 mph (299.797 km/h).

Pos	No.	Driver	Team	Manufacturer	Time	Speed
1	20	Matt Kenseth	Joe Gibbs Racing	Toyota	48.313	186.285
2	15	Clint Bowyer	Michael Waltrip Racing	Toyota	48.369	186.070
3	2	Brad Keselowski	Team Penske	Ford	48.403	185.939
Official first practice results

=== Final practice ===
Jimmie Johnson was the fastest in the final practice session with a time of 47.544 and a speed of 189.298 mph (304.646 km/h).

Pos	No.	Driver	Team	Manufacturer	Time	Speed
1	48	Jimmie Johnson	Hendrick Motorsports	Chevrolet	47.544	189.298
2	2	Brad Keselowski	Team Penske	Ford	47.747	188.494
3	4	Kevin Harvick	Stewart–Haas Racing	Chevrolet	47.780	188.363
Official final practice results

== Qualifying ==
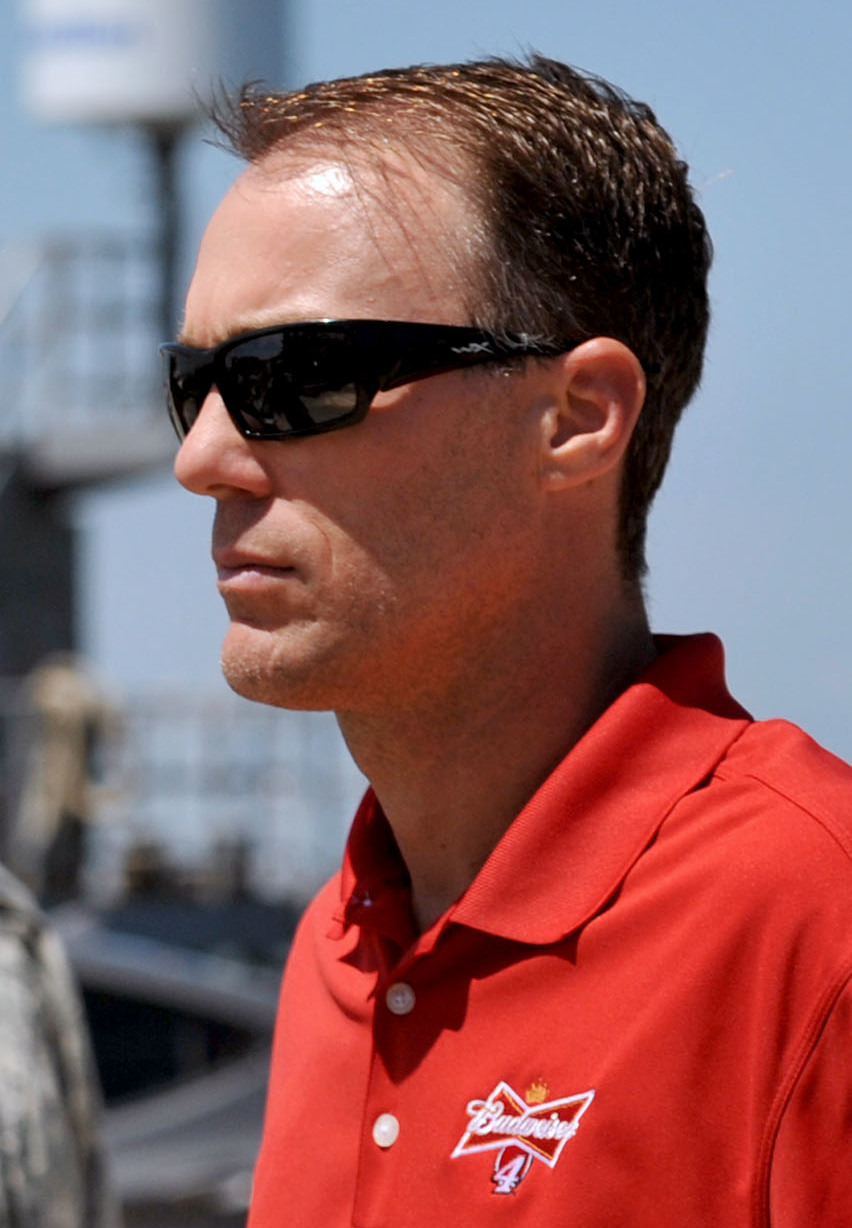
Kevin Harvick won the pole position, setting a new track record.

In qualifying, Kevin Harvick won the pole with a new track record time of 47.753 and a speed of 188.470 mph (303.313 km/h); he had been quickest in each of the three segments of the session. Harvick noted the benefit of having the last pit stall on pit road, stating that it was "going to take some pressure off the guys for sure". and also felt that if he had fallen down the order, he believed that his car was quick enough as he believed that "track position is definitely important". Jeff Gordon joined Harvick on the front row, almost two tenths of a second in arrears. Gordon referred to the performance of Harvick and his team as "they had the field covered". Gordon's teammate Dale Earnhardt Jr. – who was second in points to Gordon coming into the race weekend – could only qualify 23rd, describing his session as “pretty pathetic" and "real slow". Matt Crafton, Brett Moffitt and David Stremme failed to make the race. Aric Almirola and Marcos Ambrose started at the rear of the field for switching to a backup car and a transmission change respectively.

Pos	No.	Driver	Team	Manufacturer	R1	R2	R3
1	4	Kevin Harvick	Stewart–Haas Racing	Chevrolet	47.647	47.801	47.753
2	24	Jeff Gordon	Hendrick Motorsports	Chevrolet	48.051	48.131	47.931
3	2	Brad Keselowski	Team Penske	Ford	48.067	48.238	48.156
4	31	Ryan Newman	Richard Childress Racing	Chevrolet	48.268	48.323	48.189
5	55	Brian Vickers	Michael Waltrip Racing	Toyota	48.478	48.364	48.269
6	14	Tony Stewart	Stewart–Haas Racing	Chevrolet	48.386	48.247	48.337
7	41	Kurt Busch	Stewart–Haas Racing	Chevrolet	48.166	48.297	48.402
8	12	Juan Pablo Montoya	Team Penske	Ford	48.322	48.362	48.407
9	22	Joey Logano	Team Penske	Ford	48.371	48.366	48.432
10	5	Kasey Kahne	Hendrick Motorsports	Chevrolet	48.326	48.334	48.464
11	48	Jimmie Johnson	Hendrick Motorsports	Chevrolet	48.222	48.278	48.526
12	18	Kyle Busch	Joe Gibbs Racing	Toyota	48.517	48.441	48.651
13	20	Matt Kenseth	Joe Gibbs Racing	Toyota	48.220	48.526	—
14	10	Danica Patrick	Stewart–Haas Racing	Chevrolet	48.675	48.546	—
15	42	Kyle Larson (R)	Chip Ganassi Racing	Chevrolet	48.628	48.582	—
16	15	Clint Bowyer	Michael Waltrip Racing	Toyota	48.642	48.615	—
17	3	Austin Dillon (R)	Richard Childress Racing	Chevrolet	48.601	48.636	—
18	99	Carl Edwards	Roush Fenway Racing	Ford	48.581	48.651	—
19	16	Greg Biffle	Roush Fenway Racing	Ford	48.769	48.675	—
20	21	Trevor Bayne	Wood Brothers Racing	Ford	48.425	48.683	—
21	17	Ricky Stenhouse Jr.	Roush Fenway Racing	Ford	48.656	48.717	—
22	9	Marcos Ambrose (Note: Marcos Ambrose started at the rear of the field, after Richard Petty Motorsports changed the transmission of his car.)	Richard Petty Motorsports	Ford	48.641	48.800	—
23	88	Dale Earnhardt Jr.	Hendrick Motorsports	Chevrolet	48.515	48.943	—
24	1	Jamie McMurray	Chip Ganassi Racing	Chevrolet	48.646	49.017	—
25	78	Martin Truex Jr.	Furniture Row Racing	Chevrolet	48.794	—	—
26	13	Casey Mears	Germain Racing	Chevrolet	48.986	—	—
27	11	Denny Hamlin	Joe Gibbs Racing	Toyota	48.995	—	—
28	95	Michael McDowell	Leavine Family Racing	Ford	49.029	—	—
29	27	Paul Menard	Richard Childress Racing	Chevrolet	49.036	—	—
30	98	Josh Wise	Phil Parsons Racing	Chevrolet	49.216	—	—
31	51	Justin Allgaier (R)	HScott Motorsports	Chevrolet	49.273	—	—
32	83	Ryan Truex (R)	BK Racing	Toyota	49.295	—	—
33	7	Michael Annett (R)	Tommy Baldwin Racing	Chevrolet	49.384	—	—
34	38	David Gilliland	Front Row Motorsports	Ford	49.431	—	—
35	23	Alex Bowman (R)	BK Racing	Toyota	49.487	—	—
36	47	A. J. Allmendinger	JTG Daugherty Racing	Chevrolet	49.501	—	—
37	40	Landon Cassill	Hillman-Circle Sport LLC	Chevrolet	49.511	—	—
38	34	David Ragan	Front Row Motorsports	Ford	49.557	—	—
39	26	Cole Whitt (R)	BK Racing	Toyota	49.579	—	—
40	32	Travis Kvapil	Go FAS Racing	Ford	49.594	—	—
41	43	Aric Almirola (Note: Aric Almirola started at the rear of the field, after electing to use a backup car.)	Richard Petty Motorsports	Ford	49.816	—	—
42	36	Reed Sorenson	Tommy Baldwin Racing	Chevrolet	49.938	—	—
43	37	Bobby Labonte (Note: Bobby Labonte qualified for the race using a past champion's provisional.)	Tommy Baldwin Racing	Chevrolet	49.852	—	—
Did not qualify
44	66	Brett Moffitt	Identity Ventures Racing	Toyota	49.816	—	—
45	33	David Stremme	Hillman-Circle Sport LLC	Chevrolet	50.126	—	—
46	29	Matt Crafton	RAB Racing	Toyota	50.542	—	—
Qualifying Results

== Race ==
=== First half ===
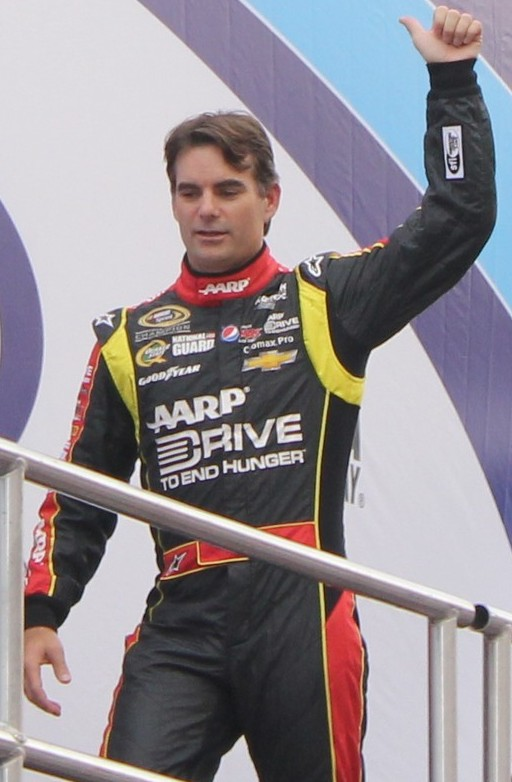
Jeff Gordon won his fifth Brickyard 400 and the 90th race of his career.

The race was scheduled to start at 1:19 p.m. Eastern time, but started a few minutes later with Kevin Harvick leading the field to the green flag, but he ceded the lead to Jeff Gordon on lap two. Due to overnight downpours, a competition caution came out on lap 21. Joey Logano stayed out when the others pitted and assumed the lead, leading the field to the restart on lap 26. Kasey Kahne took the lead from Logano on lap 32 while Paul Menard brushed the wall in turn 3 after being bumped by Juan Pablo Montoya. However, Kahne gave up the lead on lap 38 to pit, with Kyle Larson assuming the lead, handing the lead to Austin Dillon after pitting on lap 43. Dillon made his stop and handed the lead to Denny Hamlin the next lap. Hamlin made his stop on lap 55 and handed the lead back to Kevin Harvick. Gordon retook the lead from Harvick on lap 66 and then both ducked onto pit road. Hamlin retook the lead as a result.

=== Second half ===
Danica Patrick broke the rear axle of her when trying to leave pit road and stalled on the exit of pit road bringing out the second caution of the race on lap 68. The race restarted on lap 73 and Denny Hamlin lost the lead to Kasey Kahne. The caution flag came out for the third time on lap 97 when Trevor Bayne got loose and collected the inside wall in turn 3. Clint Bowyer did not pit during the caution period so he assumed the lead. The race restarted on lap 102 and Bowyer lost the lead to Kahne. Kahne made his final stop on lap 127 and handed the lead to his teammate Gordon. With 31 laps to go, Gordon made his final stop and handed the lead to Martin Truex Jr.; Truex made his stop and gave the lead to Michael Annett. Kahne cycled back to the lead with 30 laps to go, before Ryan Truex stalled in turn 2 bringing out the fourth caution of the race with 22 laps to go.

==== Finish ====
Gordon took the lead on the ensuing restart and took the checkered flag for the 90th time in his career and for the 4th time in the Brickyard 400. The win guaranteed Gordon a spot in the Chase for the Sprint Cup; Carl Edwards, Jimmie Johnson and Joey Logano also clinched spots. Kahne fell to fifth on the restart, and ran out of fuel on the final lap, finishing sixth. Gordon described his race win as "nothing better, especially in a big race, coming to Victory Lane with your family here", while he "was trying so hard with 10 to go not to focus on the crowd". Kahne reflected on his position at the final restart, stating that he should have picked the outside line, also stating "pretty much let Jeff control that restart. I took off and never spun a tire and the inside had been more grip throughout the race and I started on the inside and I thought it was a great decision. But I didn't spin a tire and Jeff drove right by me."

=== Post-race ===
"Approved parts that fail or are improperly installed to fail in their intended use of great importance (e.g.; rear wheel well panels that fail and allow air evacuation in the trunk area; oil box cover that fails and allows air evacuation in the driver compartment; shifter boot cover that fails and allows air evacuation through the floor pan.)"

— Section 12-4.5 A (9) of the 2014 NASCAR rule book.

On the Tuesday following the race, NASCAR announced that the No. 11 team of Joe Gibbs Racing – the car of Denny Hamlin, who had finished the race in third place – had been penalized for a rules infraction in post-race inspection. This infraction was levied as a P5 penalty – the second-highest level – outlined in Section 12–4.5 A (9) of the 2014 NASCAR rule book. Per the subsequent Section 12–4.5 B of the regulations, any P5 penalty resulted in a 50-point penalty for both the driver and team owner, a fine of between $75,000 and $125,000 as well as race suspension and probation periods for team members in relation to the infraction. As the infraction was detected during a post-race inspection, a further 25 championship points were deducted as well as a further fine of $50,000.

The infraction also violated several other Sections from the rule book:

- 12-1 – Actions detrimental to stock car racing;
- 20–2.1 – Car body must be acceptable to NASCAR officials and meet the following requirements:
  - K – Any device or ductwork that permits air to pass from one area of the interior of the car to another, or to the outside of the car, will not be permitted. This includes, but is not limited to, the inside of the car to the trunk area, or the floors, firewalls, crush panels and wheel wells passing air into or out of the car;
  - L – All seams of the interior sheet metal and all interior sheet metal to exterior sheet metal contact point must be sealed and caulked. This includes, but is not limited to, floors, firewalls, wheel wells, package trays, crush panels and any removable covers;
  - 20–3.4 – All references to the inspection surface in sub-section 20–3.4 have been determined with the front lower edge of both main frame rails set at six inches and the rear lower edge of both main frame rails set at eight inches. For driver protection, all firewalls, floors, tunnels, and access panels must be installed and completely secured in place when the car is in competition;
- 20–3.4.5 – A rear firewall, including any removable panels or access doors, constructed using magnetic sheet steel a minimum of 22 gauge (0.031 inch thick), must be located between the trunk area and the driver's compartment and must be welded in place. Block-off plates/covers used in rear firewalls in place of blowers, oil coolers, etc., must be constructed of 22 gauge (0.031 inch thick) magnetic sheet steel. Block-off plates/covers must be installed with positive fasteners and sealed to prevent air leakage. Carbon fiber or aluminum block-off plates/covers will not be permitted.

Accordingly, crew chief Darian Grubb was fined $125,000 post-race, suspended for the next six races and placed on NASCAR probation for a six-month period – until January 29, 2015 – while car chief Wesley Sherrill was also suspended six races and placed on NASCAR probation until the same date. Denny Hamlin lost 75 drivers' championship points, while the team lost 75 points in the owners' championship.

=== Race results ===
Pos	No.	Driver	Team	Manufacturer	Laps	Points
1	24	Jeff Gordon	Hendrick Motorsports	Chevrolet	160	47
2	18	Kyle Busch	Joe Gibbs Racing	Toyota	160	42
3	11	Denny Hamlin	Joe Gibbs Racing	Toyota	160	−33 (Note: Denny Hamlin was penalized 75 points for a technical infraction following post-race inspection for a net of −33. Hamlin had accumulated 42 points – 41 for his race position, and 1 for leading the race – prior to the penalty.)
4	20	Matt Kenseth	Joe Gibbs Racing	Toyota	160	40
5	22	Joey Logano	Team Penske	Ford	160	40
6	5	Kasey Kahne	Hendrick Motorsports	Chevrolet	160	40
7	42	Kyle Larson (R)	Chip Ganassi Racing	Chevrolet	160	38
8	4	Kevin Harvick	Stewart–Haas Racing	Chevrolet	160	37
9	88	Dale Earnhardt Jr.	Hendrick Motorsports	Chevrolet	160	35
10	3	Austin Dillon (R)	Richard Childress Racing	Chevrolet	160	35
11	31	Ryan Newman	Richard Childress Racing	Chevrolet	160	33
12	2	Brad Keselowski	Team Penske	Ford	160	32
13	16	Greg Biffle	Roush Fenway Racing	Ford	160	31
14	48	Jimmie Johnson	Hendrick Motorsports	Chevrolet	160	30
15	99	Carl Edwards	Roush Fenway Racing	Ford	160	29
16	15	Clint Bowyer	Michael Waltrip Racing	Toyota	160	29
17	14	Tony Stewart	Stewart–Haas Racing	Chevrolet	160	27
18	47	A. J. Allmendinger	JTG Daugherty Racing	Chevrolet	160	26
19	55	Brian Vickers	Michael Waltrip Racing	Toyota	160	25
20	1	Jamie McMurray	Chip Ganassi Racing	Chevrolet	160	24
21	43	Aric Almirola	Richard Petty Motorsports	Ford	160	23
22	9	Marcos Ambrose	Richard Petty Motorsports	Ford	160	22
23	12	Juan Pablo Montoya	Team Penske	Ford	160	21
24	17	Ricky Stenhouse Jr.	Roush Fenway Racing	Ford	160	20
25	78	Martin Truex Jr.	Furniture Row Racing	Chevrolet	160	19
26	95	Michael McDowell	Leavine Family Racing	Ford	160	18
27	51	Justin Allgaier (R)	HScott Motorsports	Chevrolet	159	17
28	41	Kurt Busch	Stewart–Haas Racing	Chevrolet	159	16
29	98	Josh Wise	Phil Parsons Racing	Chevrolet	159	15
30	40	Landon Cassill	Hillman-Circle Sport LLC	Chevrolet	158	(14) (Note: The driver was not registered for driver points in the Sprint Cup Series, and did not score driver points. The team earned owner points listed under NASCAR's car owner points policy.)
31	7	Michael Annett (R)	Tommy Baldwin Racing	Chevrolet	158	14
32	26	Cole Whitt (R)	BK Racing	Toyota	158	12
33	13	Casey Mears	Germain Racing	Chevrolet	158	11
34	27	Paul Menard	Richard Childress Racing	Chevrolet	158	10
35	34	David Ragan	Front Row Motorsports	Ford	158	9
36	38	David Gilliland	Front Row Motorsports	Ford	157	8
37	37	Bobby Labonte	Tommy Baldwin Racing	Chevrolet	157	7
38	36	Reed Sorenson	Tommy Baldwin Racing	Chevrolet	156	6
39	32	Travis Kvapil	Go FAS Racing	Ford	156	5
40	23	Alex Bowman (R)	BK Racing	Toyota	156	4
41	83	Ryan Truex (R)	BK Racing	Toyota	149	3
42	10	Danica Patrick	Stewart–Haas Racing	Chevrolet	114	2
43	21	Trevor Bayne	Wood Brothers Racing	Ford	96	(1)
Race Results

=== Race summary ===
- Lead changes: 15
- Cautions: 4 for 16 laps
- Red flags: 0
- Time of race: 2 hours, 39 minutes and 41 seconds
- Average Speed: 150.297 miles per hour (241.880 km/h)

== Media ==
=== Television ===
ESPN
Booth announcers	Pit reporters
Lap-by-lap: Allen Bestwick; Color-commentator: Dale Jarrett; Color commentator: Andy Petree	Jerry Punch; Dave Burns; Vince Welch; Jamie Little

=== Radio ===
IMS Radio
Booth announcers	Turn announcers	Pit reporters
Lead announcer: Doug Rice; Announcer: John Andretti	Turn 1: Jerry Baker; Turn 2: Jake Query; Turn 3: Mark Jaynes; Turn 4: Kevin Lee	Nick Yeoman; Michael Young; Dave Furst; Dave Wilson

== Standings after the race ==
Drivers' Championship standings

	Pos	Driver	Points
	1	Jeff Gordon	717
	2	Dale Earnhardt Jr.	693 (−24)
	3	Brad Keselowski	666 (−51)
	4	Matt Kenseth	661 (−56)
	5	Jimmie Johnson	628 (−89)
2	6	Kyle Busch	609 (−108)
	7	Ryan Newman	606 (−111)
2	8	Carl Edwards	603 (−114)
	9	Joey Logano	591 (−126)
	10	Clint Bowyer	577 (−140)
2	11	Kevin Harvick	565 (−152)
2	12	Kyle Larson (R)	562 (−155)
2	13	Austin Dillon (R)	559 (−158)
3	14	Kasey Kahne	555 (−162)
4	15	Paul Menard	551 (−166)
1	16	Greg Biffle	550 (−167)

Manufacturers' Championship standings

Pos	Manufacturer	Points
1	Chevrolet	895
2	Ford	874 (−21)
3	Toyota	808 (−87)

- Note: Only the first sixteen positions are included for the driver standings.

== Notes ==
Previous race: 2014 Camping World RV Sales 301	Sprint Cup Series; 2014 season	Next race: 2014 Gobowling.com 400
