= Lou Palmer (motorsport broadcaster) =

American broadcaster at the Indy 500

Lou Palmer (born Louis A. Perunko Jr. on March 10, 1932, in Wheeling, West Virginia – died January 19, 2008, in Indianapolis, Indiana) was an American broadcaster best known for his work at the Indianapolis 500 on the Indianapolis Motor Speedway Radio Network from 1958 until 1989.

== Indianapolis 500 ==
Palmer, who was raised in Syracuse, New York, had moved to Indianapolis in 1953. Shortly after joining the news department of WIBC in Indianapolis he received an invitation from the "Voice of the 500", Sid Collins to join the IMS Radio Network for the 1958 Indianapolis 500. As a rookie on the network, Palmer was assigned to the rather remote location of turn three of the track because 'nothing ever happens there'. On the opening lap of the race, however, Palmer was thrust into duty, reporting on a massive 15-car pileup that occurred in the turn. The crash almost completely blocked the track and ended with the death of driver Pat O'Connor. Jerry Unser's car cleared the track's outer retaining wall causing him to suffer a dislocated shoulder during the first lap crash.

In 1963 Palmer moved from turn 3, and became a pit reporter for race day, a position he would hold through 1987. During his time as a pit reporter, he traditionally covered the south pits and interviewed the winning driver in victory lane. In 1988, he moved into the booth, replacing Paul Page as the chief announcer of the 500.

Palmer's tenure as chief announcer lasted only two years (1988–1989). After the 1989 race, he was released of the position and replaced by Bob Jenkins. Palmer holds the distinction of the shortest tenure of all IMS Radio Network chief announcers with just two races.

Palmer later anchored the CART radio network.

Following the 1988 Indy 500, Palmer and Paul Page co-hosted/narrated a 3-hour video produced by the Indianapolis Motor Speedway called "The Indianapolis 500 – An American Tradition since 1911". The production detailed each Indianapolis 500 race until 1988 and included archive footage as well as interviews with drivers such as 1911 winner Ray Harroun and the first triple winner of the 500 Louis Meyer. It also told the history of the IMS and its founding father Carl Fisher, as well as later owners Eddie Rickenbacker and Tony Hulman.

Palmer continued to work at WIBC during the year but annually took a hiatus every May which he would spend most waking hours at the Speedway, feeding daily reports every 30 minutes and anchoring WIBC's day-long qualification coverage.

== Death ==
Lou Palmer died on January 19, 2008, in Indianapolis at the age of 75. He was survived by his second wife Beverly, son Al and daughter Laura. His first wife Cal died in 1997.

Preceded by Paul Page	Radio voice of the Indianapolis 500; 1988–1989	Succeeded by Bob Jenkins
