= Indianapolis Motor Speedway Radio Network =

Radio network carrying events at the Indianapolis Motor Speedway

- Type: Broadcast syndication
- Country: United States

Ownership
- Owner: Indianapolis Motor Speedway via. Penske Entertainment
- Key people: Sid Collins, Paul Page, Bob Jenkins, Lou Palmer, Mike King, Mark Jaynes

History
- Founded: 1952; 74 years ago
- Launch date: May 30, 1952; 74 years ago
- Former names: Indy Racing Radio Network (1998–2002)

Coverage
- Affiliates: Over 400; SiriusXM; AFN; World Harvest

Links
- Website: indycarradio.com

The Indianapolis Motor Speedway Radio Network (known typically as the IMS Radio Network or the INDYCAR Radio Network), is an in-house radio syndication arrangement which broadcasts the Indianapolis 500, the NTT IndyCar Series, and Indy NXT to radio stations covering most of North America. The network, owned by the Indianapolis Motor Speedway and headquartered in Speedway, Indiana, claims to be one of the largest of its kind in the world. It currently boasts over 350 terrestrial radio affiliates, plus shortwave transmissions through American Forces Network and World Harvest Radio. The network is carried on satellite radio through SiriusXM, and is also accessible through online streaming, and downloadable podcasts. For 2017, the broadcast reached 20.5 million listeners.

The longtime flagship of the network is 1070/WFNI (formerly WIBC, currently broadcasting on WIBC-HD3 and its FM translators) in Indianapolis, with WIBC's main FM analog signal also simulcasting the race. Mark Jaynes is the current anchor and chief announcer for the network, a role he assumed beginning in 2016. Davey Hamilton is the Driver Analyst.

The most notable personality from the network is hall of fame broadcaster Sid Collins, who was the original "Voice of the 500" from 1952 to 1976. Other notable broadcasters over the network's history include Paul Page, Bob Jenkins, Lou Palmer, Jerry Baker, Bob Lamey, and dozens more. In addition, former Indy 500 drivers Fred Agabashian, Len Sutton, Johnny Rutherford, and numerous others have served as analysts.

== History ==
=== Early radio coverage ===
Coverage of the Indianapolis 500 on radio dates back to 1922. Two small stations, WOH and WLK, broadcast descriptions of the race to a small number of households in the Indianapolis area. Starting in either 1924 or 1925, WFBM and WGN in Chicago carried the race, broadcasting periodic updates. In 1929, WKBF and WFBM carried a 5 1/2-hour full race broadcast.

The first major coverage came in 1928 when NBC covered the final hour of the race live, with Graham McNamee as anchor. There was no radio coverage in 1932, as Speedway officials decided to allow newspapers exclusive coverage of the race. NBC eventually returned, and continued until 1939, in some years also carrying live segments at the start. Charlie Lyons was their announcer for 1939. CBS also covered the race in the late 1930s, with Ted Husing anchoring the coverage in 1936. WIRE and WLW also reported from the race during the 1930s.

=== Mutual / WIBC ===
From 1939 to 1950, Mutual Broadcasting System covered the Indianapolis 500 nationwide with live segments at the start, the finish, and live periodic updates throughout the race. Bill Slater was brought in as the anchor. In the years prior to World War II, Mutual used the production services of WLW, and provided the signal to other Mutual stations across the country. In the years after World War II, Mutual utilized the services of WIBC to produce the broadcast and provide additional talent.

In 1950, due to an illness, Slater was expected to miss the broadcast. Sid Collins, who had served as a turn reporter for two years, was tentatively named his replacement. Slater was able to make it to the race, so Collins joined Slater in the booth as co-anchor. Later in the day, Collins reported from victory lane. That year's race was cut short by rain, forcing Mutual to interrupt Queen for a Day to broadcast the finish of the rain-shortened event.

For 1951, Mutual substantially raised its advertising rates, and its primary sponsor, Perfect Circle Piston Rings, pulled its support. Mutual eventually decided to stop covering the event, and it appeared for a time that the 1951 race would not carried on radio. In early May of 1951, Speedway president Wilbur Shaw consummated a last-minute deal for WIBC to cover the race, with Sid Collins as anchor. WIBC's format followed that of Mutual's, with live coverage at the start, the finish, and periodic updates throughout the race. WIBC provided its coverage to approximately 25 other Mutual affiliates.

=== IMS Radio Network ===
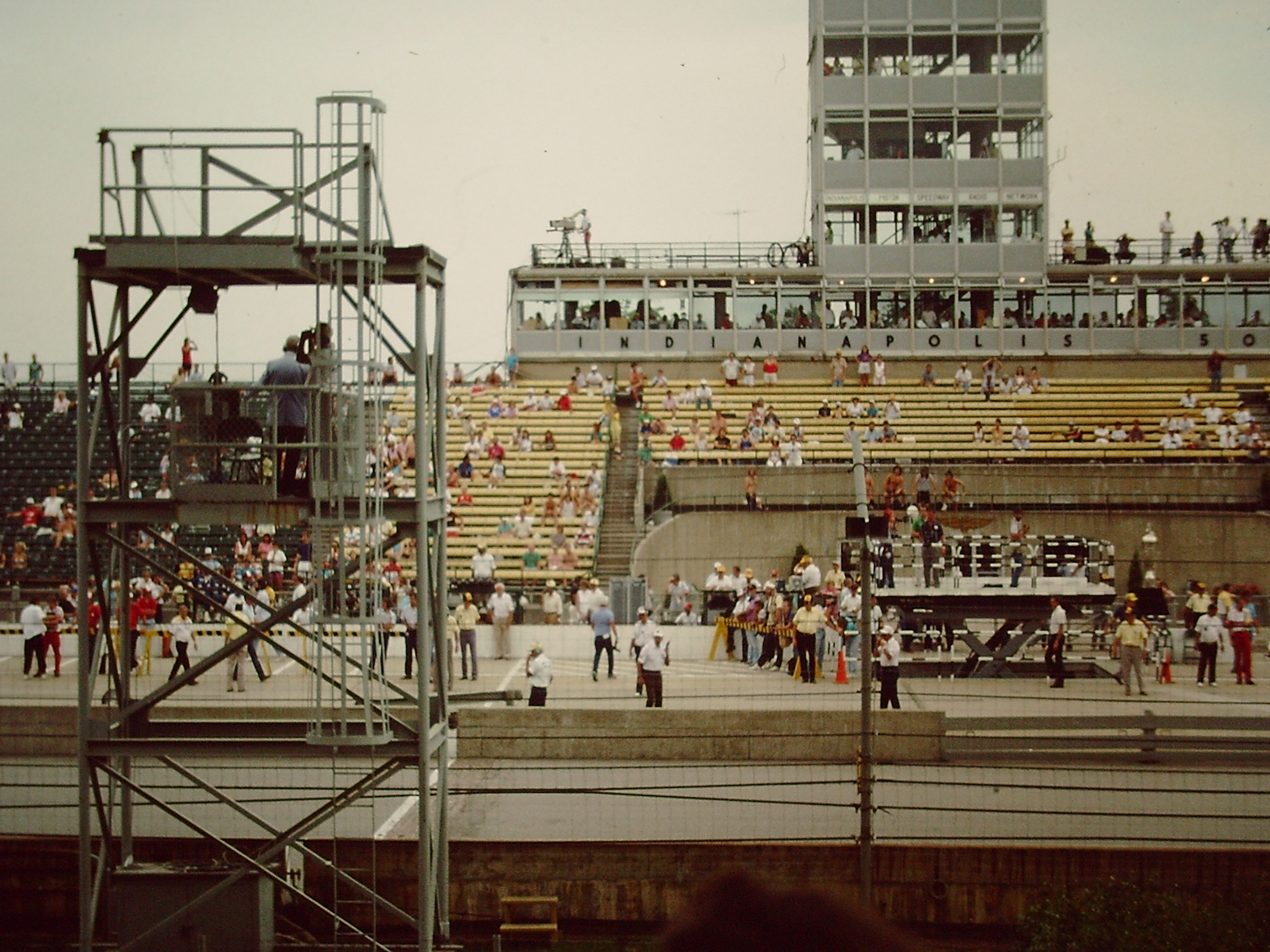
From 1957 to 1998, the IMS Radio Network booth was on the second floor of the Master Control Tower.

After the success of WIBC's radio effort in 1951, the Speedway management became interested in taking the broadcasting duties in-house permanently. In 1952, the Speedway officially launched the Indianapolis Motor Speedway Radio Network, utilizing on-air talent and technical support from WIBC. The format again followed the Mutual-style format, with live coverage at the start, the finish, and periodic updates during the race. Starting in 1953, after complaints from the other four stations in the area, the talent pool was extended to feature personalities from all five Indianapolis radio stations. The 1953 race was notable in that it expanded to feature the first live "flag-to-flag" coverage, and the affiliate count had already grown to 130 stations. During this time, the broadcast was typically simulcast on all of the major stations in Indianapolis, and the nationwide affiliate count continued to grow rapidly. In some years, affiliates would sign up as late as the morning of the race, anxious to carry the broadcast. By 1955, the broadcast could be heard in all 48 states (there were only 48 states at the time). In 1961, it reached new states Alaska and Hawaii as well. Worldwide shortwave transmission through Armed Forces Radio started in 1953, and claimed to reach every country where English was spoken. In 1964, an affiliate in Rhode Island picked up the broadcast for the first time, meaning that a terrestrial affiliate originating from all 50 states were now part of the network (previously Rhode Island listeners could only hear the broadcast from a neighboring state). WJAR in Providence signed on to the 1964 race with 557 other affiliates for the historic milestone.

Former Indy 500 driver Elmer George, husband of Mari Hulman George, and father of Tony George, would eventually become the director of the network. He served in the position until his death in 1976. During his tenure as chief announcer, Sid Collins frequently referred to the outfit as the "Indianapolis Motor Speedway Network", omitting the word "Radio". In the 21st century, the announcers now commonly refer to it simply as the "IMS Radio Network".

From 1952 to 1985, the IMS Radio Network was the only outlet for live coverage of the Indianapolis 500. Television coverage on ABC at the time was a tape-delayed format, and for only a very brief time (1965–70) MCA aired a closed-circuit live telecast of the race. The radio broadcast was the primary coverage of the race for most fans in the U.S. and around the world, including many thousands at the track itself. The network experienced its heyday of popularity from the 1960s to the early 1980s. During the late seventies and early eighties, its affiliate count swelled to over 1,200 stations. Along with shortwave transmissions, and various foreign language translations, the network boasted at one time over 100 million listeners worldwide.

In 1994, the network began broadcasting the Brickyard 400 as the only NASCAR races not carried by MRN or PRN, and in 1996, began covering all events of the Indy Racing League. From 1997 to 2002, the network's name was briefly changed to the Indy Racing Radio Network to reflect the expanded content. In 2004, PRN began jointly producing the Brickyard 400 broadcast, and the broadcast streaming rights became part of PRN, not IMS.

From 2000 to 2007, the network also carried the Formula One U.S. Grand Prix. In addition to live race coverage, the network provides reports at Indy 500 time trials, and a talk show titled "Indy Live" which features interviews and other race news.

After the race went to live coverage on ABC-TV in 1986, then to NBC in 2019, the number of radio affiliates for the network steadily declined over the next two decades. However, the radio network's popularity remains strong, and maintains a cult following, particularly in the greater Indianapolis area, where the live television broadcast remains blacked out by the Indianapolis network affiliate carrying the race (as of 2025, Fox's WXIN) unless the race is sold out. Also, to provide contractual continuity for stations which mainly carry the entire NASCAR schedule, PRN affiliates that wish to carry the Big Machine 400 NASCAR Cup oval event and Shell 150 Xfinity road course event are required to also carry the Indianapolis 500. If there are two different PRN and IMS Radio affiliates in a market, the IMS Radio affiliate retains the contractual right of first refusal.

As of 2017, the broadcast is carried on over 350 terrestrial radio affiliates, shortwave (AFN and World Harvest Radio), satellite radio (SiriusXM), online streaming, and podcast. Official releases of historical radio broadcasts have also been available for purchase. For INDYCAR races, the streaming of radio broadcasts is on INDYCAR's Web site. For NASCAR races, online streaming rights belong to PRN.

== Network details ==
=== Reporting locations ===
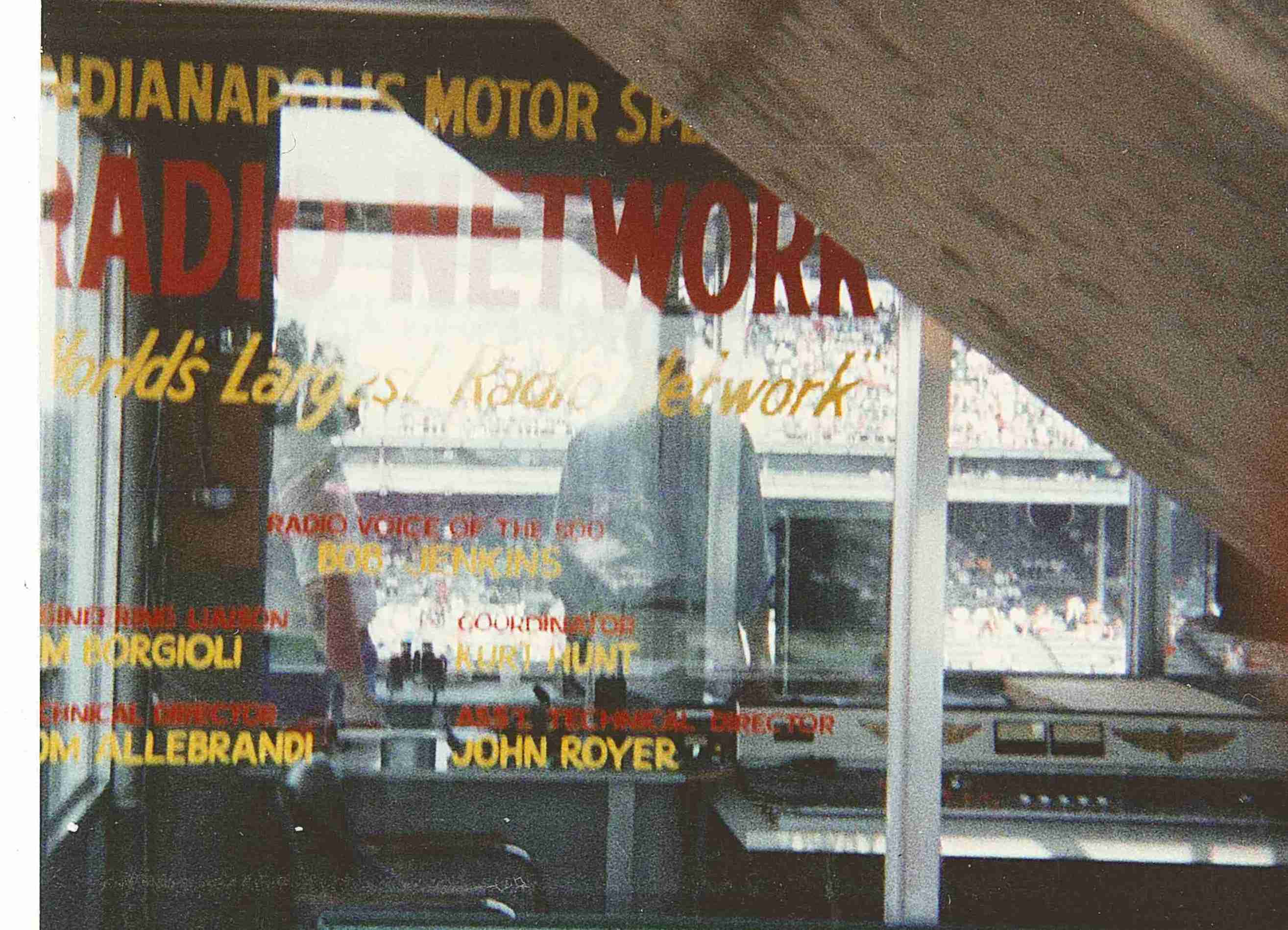
Radio Network booth inside the old Master Control Tower. Bob Jenkins is visible in this 1991 photograph.

The broadcast originates from the "Sid Collins Booth" on the fourth floor of the Indianapolis Motor Speedway media center, next to the main control tower at the Speedway, known as the Pagoda. From 1957 to 1998, the broadcast originated from the glass and steel Master Control Tower, which formerly stood where Pagoda is today. Prior to that, a radio booth was situated inside or in front of the wooden pagoda that pre-dated the Master Control Tower. For the 1999 race, a temporary makeshift booth was utilized during construction of the new Pagoda.

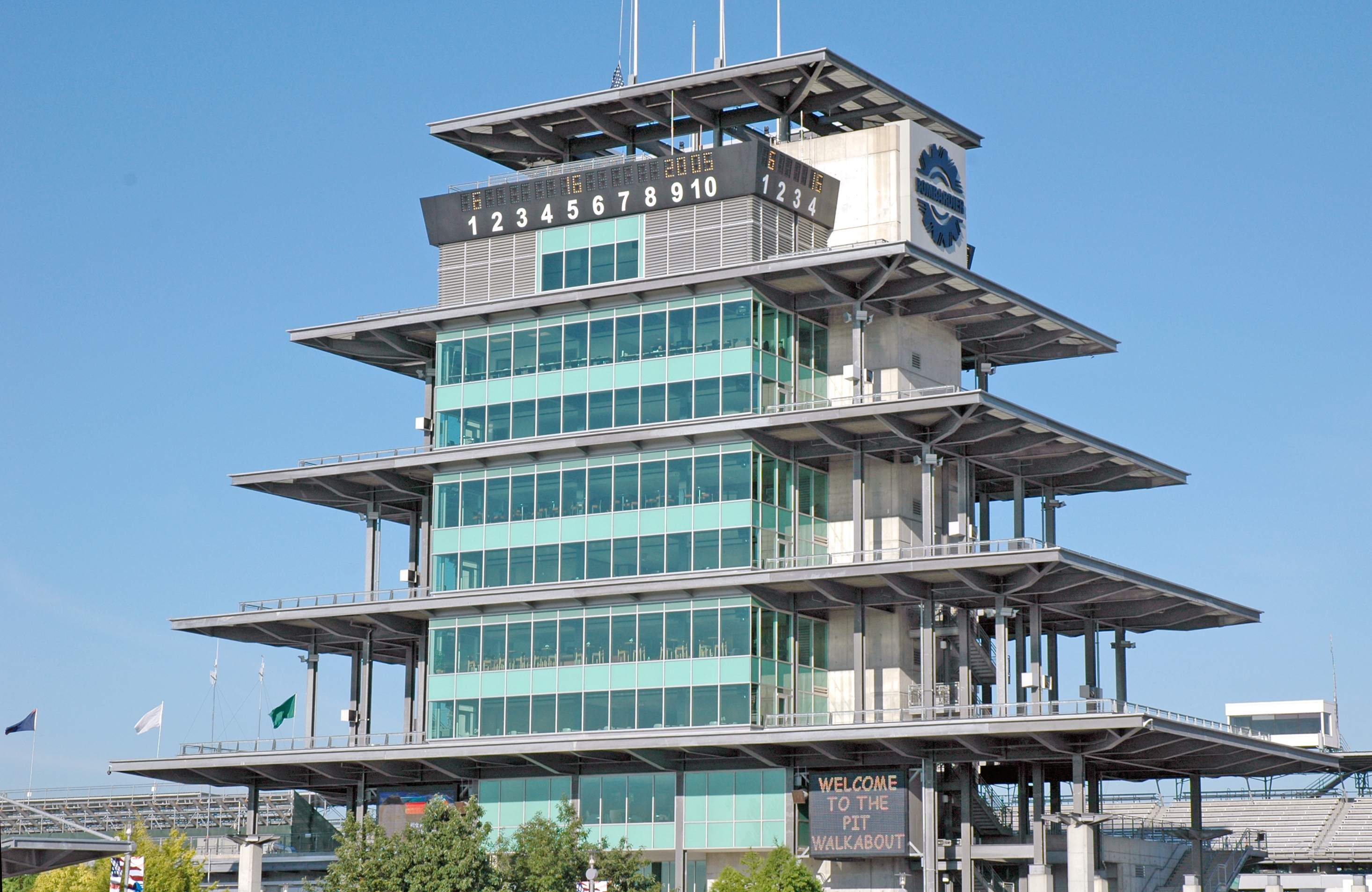
Pagoda at the Indianapolis Motor Speedway was completed in 2000.

Since its inception, additional reporters have been stationed around the track, covering the vast circuit in the turns and in the pit area. In the 1940s and early 1950s, a roving reporter was assigned to the south turns (turns 1 and 2), and another was assigned to the north turns (turns 3 and 4). A vantage point on the backstretch was also manned. By 1957, the crew was expanded with a reporter assigned to each of the four turns, as well as the backstretch, for a total of five remote locations. In the pit area, the crew expanded to three men, one each covering the north pits, center pits, and south pits. With the starting field traditionally comprising 33 cars, each pit reporter was assigned roughly eleven pit stalls from which to observe and report. The three-man pit reporting crew of Chuck Marlowe, (north), Luke Walton (center), and Lou Palmer (south) became a fixture of the broadcast for over twenty years. Other key fixtures in the turns included Jim Shelton (turn 4), Howdy Bell (turn 2), Mike Ahern, and Ron Carrell. When the pit road was lengthened in 1974, a fourth pit reporter was added. Also in the 1970s, a wireless roving reporter was added with his duties primarily to cover the garage area and track hospital. In other selected years, a second roving reporter was part of the crew to conduct celebrity interviews, and report on the social scene at the track.

Prior to the 1970s, there were not grandstands in all four corners. Most notably the reporters in turn two and turn three did not have grandstands to serve as a vantage point until later years. Without grandstands, reporters in those turns may be stationed trackside, in the infield, or perched on a photography platform, with usually limited views.

After the 1984 race, the backstretch reporting location was eliminated. Due to the rising speeds of the race cars, the position was deemed unnecessary. Furthermore, due to an improved location, the turn three reporter was now able to see the entire backstretch from his vantage point. The backstretch was brought back briefly in 1989 and 1990 as a minor role for veteran announcer Howdy Bell. It was then eliminated permanently beginning in 1991.

Starting in the 2010s, the once prestigious turn one location was sometimes left vacant. The faster pace of the broadcasts, as well as the fact that the chief announcer in the pagoda had a clear view of the entire turn, was the reason for the change. The position was omitted in 2010, but was brought back for the 2011 race when the league utilized double-file restarts. It was eliminated again for 2012–2013. When Paul Page returned to the network in 2014, he reinstated the turn one post, and it remained through 2017. For 2018, it was vacant again.

From 2000 to 2018, the broadcast originated from a broadcast booth on the ninth floor of the Pagoda. In 2019, NBC took over television rights of the Indianapolis 500. NBC elected to take over the broadcasting booth formerly occupied by the radio network on the 9th floor of the Pagoda. The radio network crew moved to the booth formerly utilized by ABC-TV on the second floor of the Pagoda. As a result, the chief announcer no longer had a clear view of turn one, and the separate turn one announcer (which was left vacant multiple times in the past several years) had to be brought back. In 2021, the radio crew moved to a brand new radio booth that was constructed inside the media center. Technical support for the network is still based out of a control room on the 9th floor of the Pagoda.

=== Broadcast details ===
The broadcast traditionally opens and closes with a rendition of the song called "The 500", originally recorded by the Singing Hoosiers and Jazz Ensemble of Indiana University, (lyrics written by Joe Jordan). Several versions of the song have been used over the years including a disco version during the 1980s, and an up-tempo marching band version used briefly for 1992 and 1993. Since 1995, an instrumental version has been featured. The original 1961 recording is often played briefly during a cold open segment, followed by the updated version and the official opening credits sequence. In 2014, when Paul Page made his return as anchor, he chose to feature his signature "Delta Force" intro instead of "The 500" song. "The 500" song returned in 2015.

In the early years of the network through 1958, the broadcast typically came on-air fifteen minutes prior to the start of the race. From 1959 to 1971, the pre-race coverage was expanded to thirty minutes, and would include some of the official pre-race ceremonies. From 1972 to 1982 the pre-race coverage was scheduled for 45 minutes, coming on-air at 10:15 a.m. local time. Beginning in 1983, the pre-race was expanded to one hour. In 2016, a special two-hour pre-race was aired, celebrating the 100th running.

Since 1954, the broadcast has featured the famous phrase "Stay tuned for the Greatest Spectacle in Racing." Due to the increased number of affiliates at the time, the network needed a scripted "out-cue" to alert radio station engineers and producers when to manually insert local commercials. A young WIBC marketing staff member named Alice Greene (later Bunger) is credited with inventing the phrase, and chief announcer Sid Collins coined it on-air. It has been used ever since, with all of the chief announcers proudly reciting it during their respective tenures. In 1982, the phrase was briefly amended to "Stay tuned for the Greatest Spectacle in Sports," but that version was only used that year. When Bob Jenkins recited the phrase, he normally began it as "Now stay tuned...", and others used that variation on occasion.

Since 2010, variations to the out-cue have been used in some broadcasts. Some years have featured the out-cue recited by some of the drivers in the starting field. In some years, historic renditions by the former chief announcers have been used. In 2017, a separate voice announcer was used.

== Personalities ==
=== The Voice of The 500 ===
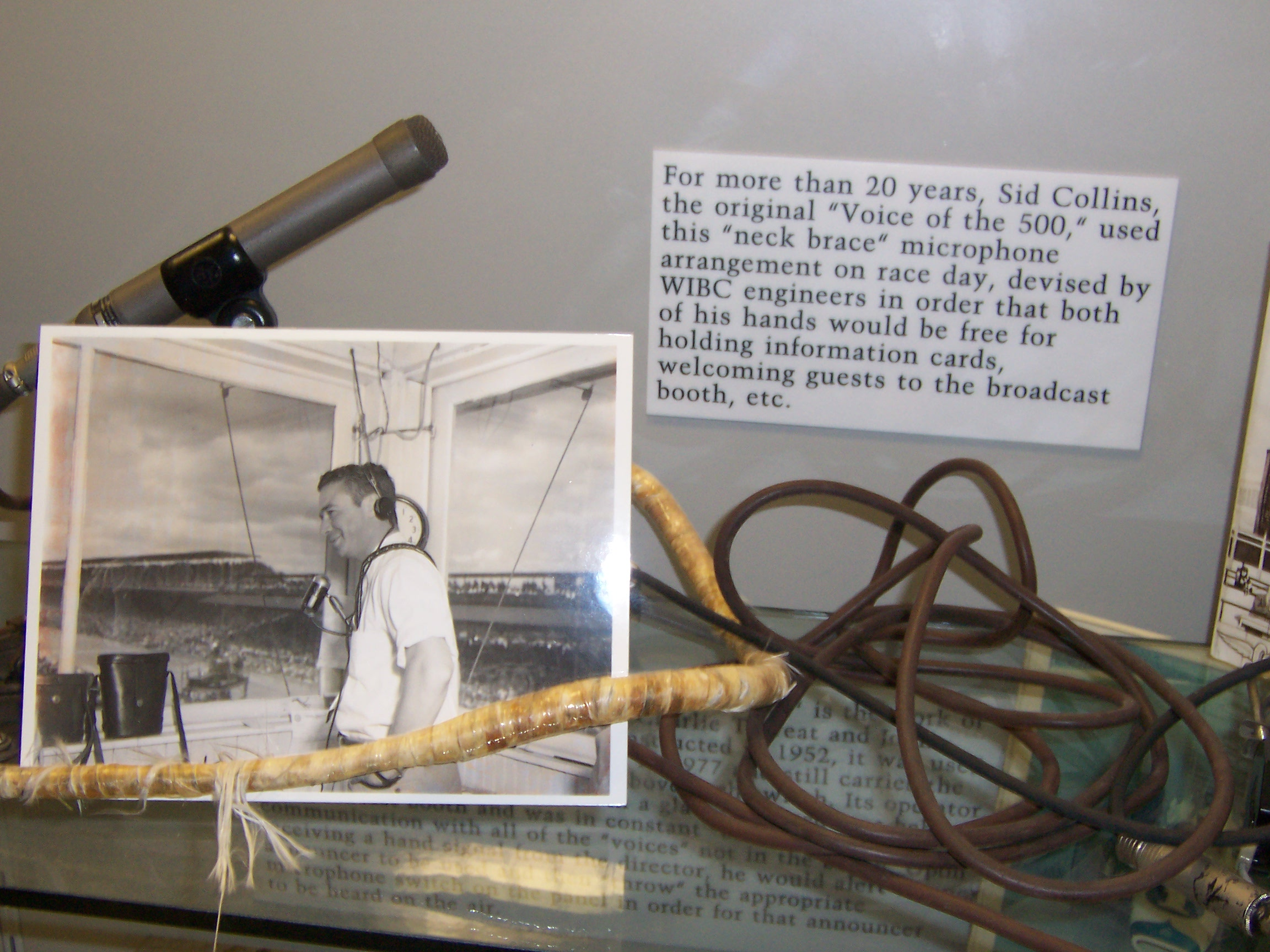
Sid Collins display at the Indianapolis Motor Speedway Hall of Fame Museum

The play-by-play, or "Chief Announcer" of the race is known as The Voice of The 500. Although Bill Slater anchored early broadcasts on Mutual, Sid Collins, who had served alongside Slater in previous years as a turn reporter or analyst, is considered by most as the first true Voice. For the opening quarter-century of the Network's official independent existence, from 1952 to 1976, Collins served as the chief announcer, and ultimately as the template for all who have successively followed. One of Collins' most notable moments in broadcasting came during the 1964 race. After a fiery crash on the main stretch, Collins delivered an impromptu eulogy for Eddie Sachs, who was killed in the accident along with Dave MacDonald. The network received over 30,000 letters asking for a transcript of the on-air eulogy. Collins committed suicide on May 2, 1977, after being diagnosed with ALS.

Paul Page, whom Collins mentored, took over as chief announcer from 1977 to 1987. Page left for ABC-TV in 1988. Lou Palmer, formerly a pit reporter, then served the shortest tenure to date as Voice, (1988–1989). Bob Jenkins replaced Palmer, and called the event from 1990 to 1998. Mike King elevated to the position in 1999, after serving four years as a pit reporter. At fifteen years, King served the second-longest tenure as Voice, until his resignation in 2013. King was replaced by veteran Paul Page, who returned to the role after a 27-year absence. Page's second stint lasted three years (2014–2016). At the 2016 race, Page called the start of the race, then passed the duty on to Mark Jaynes.

Some historians and traditionalists prefer not to bestow Collins' successors with the prestigious title of Voice of the 500, arguing that Collins is the original and only true "Voice," and in fact coined the moniker for himself. There has been no consensus ever reached, and Page, Palmer, Jenkins, King, and Jaynes, all have been referred to over the years as either "Voice" or "Chief Announcer" whether formally or informally.

=== Analysts ===
In addition to the chief announcer, turn reporters, and pit reporters, there are several other analysts and personalities that are part of the crew. Since 1955, a "driver expert" has been part of the broadcast, serving as a color commentator. The position is typically held by a retired/inactive driver, or in some years a driver who failed to qualify for the race. Fred Agabashian held the seat for several years. Speedway historian Donald Davidson has appeared on the broadcast every year from 1964 to 2019. In 1964, he was a guest interviewed in the booth during the race, and starting in 1965 he joined the crew in an official capacity. Other former analysts include Chris Economaki and Dave "The King" Wilson. During its heyday, the broadcast crew was a Who's Who of notable radio talent from Indiana, both on-air and technical staff. Being named to the crew was considered a prestigious honor.

From the inception of the network through the early 1990s, a "Statistician" position was used. The statistician kept track of the race scoring, and would come on air to recite the scoring serials and average speeds at regular intervals - typically every 10 laps. The position was demanding, requiring close coordination with the USAC officials downstairs in race control. The radio network crew typically facilitated its own team of unofficial serial scorers to follow the progress of the race. That allowed the scoring reports to be announced on-air faster than the official scorekeepers could produce them from race control. The two-man scoring crew of Bill Fleetemeyer and Bill Lamb was a fixture of the network for many years. During the network's heyday, it was a popular rite for many listeners at home to chart the scoring throughout the race. Similarly, fans listening at the track often relied heavily on radio reports to keep track of the leaders, as scoreboards at the track (the iconic pylon on the main stretch, and the two "carousel" scoreboards in the shortchutes), were not visible to all fans, and furthermore sometimes lagged far behind real time and were not always accurate, or showed incomplete information.

The scoring and statistician positions quickly became outdated and obsolete when sophisticated electronic scoring equipment was adopted in the early 1990s. In the 2000s, by which time all scoring was done by computers, and likewise available in real time online, through mobile devices, and abundantly visible on video boards and digital scoreboards around the facility, the position was permanently retired.

From 1994 to 1999, Mike Joy anchored the Brickyard 400 broadcasts. Mike King took his place from 2000 to 2003. From 2004 until his retirement in 2024, Doug Rice was the lead announce, as part of a deal with the PRN. At the 2015 Indianapolis 500, Doug Rice joined the crew as a pit reporter. Rice performed "double duty", working the pits for the Indy 500, then flying to Charlotte Motor Speedway to call the Coca-Cola 600 later in the evening. IMS and PRN exchange talent when necessary for each other's races. For example, during the INDYCAR off-season, IMS crews have worked NASCAR races at Kentucky Speedway (when there was a conflict with the Cup weekend at New Hampshire Motor Speedway) and the Charlotte Motor Speedway road course (where extra broadcasters are required).

=== Broadcasting styles ===
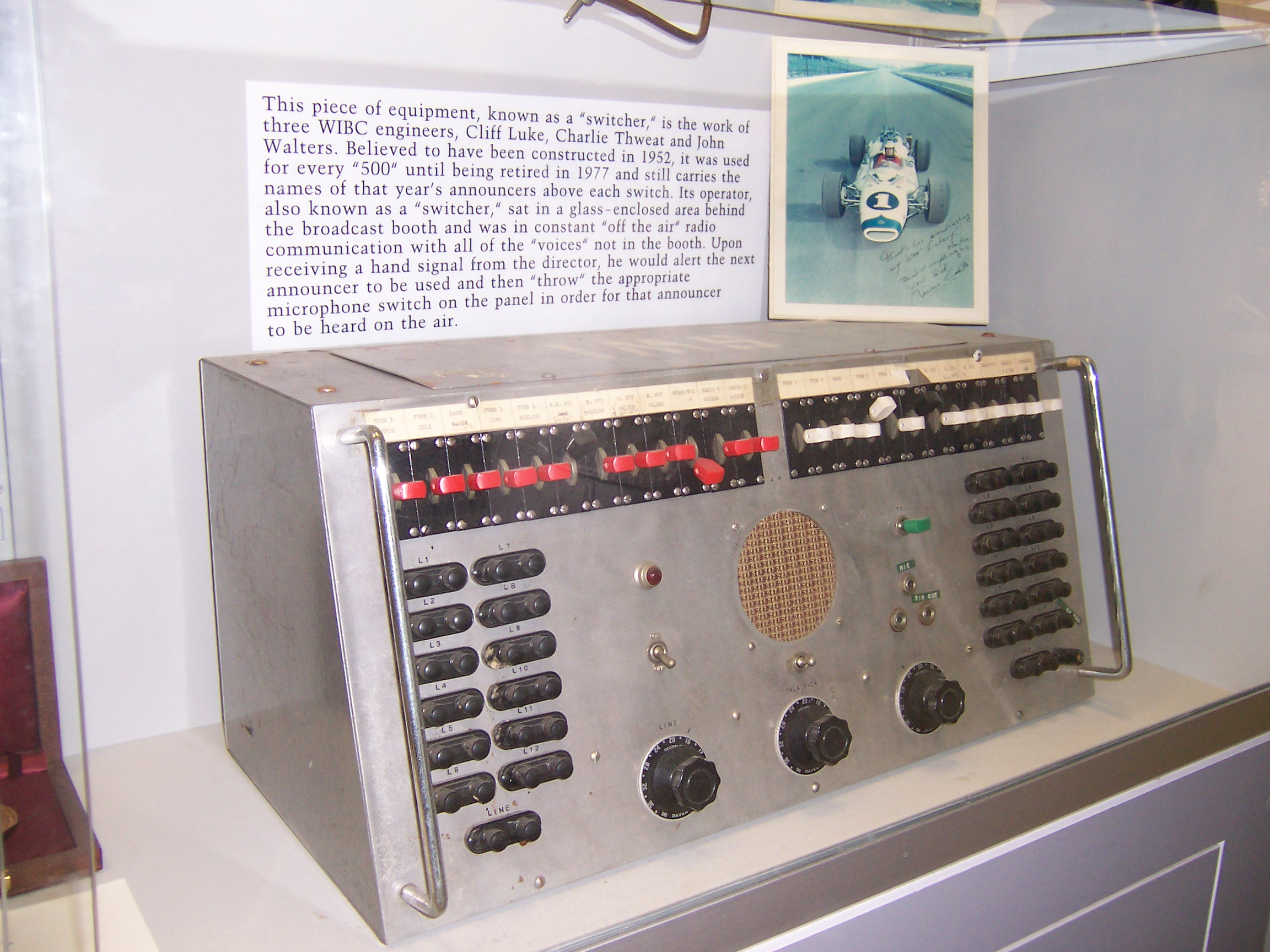
Switchboard from the radio network

Each of the different anchors had a noticeably different respective broadcasting style, and the race coverage was heavily influenced by the chief announcer's direction. During the Sid Collins era, the broadcast resembled more of an entertainment-based broadcast than a sporting event, with Collins old-time radio style setting the tone. Particularly in the 1950s and 1960s, there was limited play-by-play commentary, largely because during this period, it was not unusual for long stretches of the race to see little or no action. Turn reporters typically did not "call" the race live, in-part due to the limitations of the equipment. Rather, when incidents occurred on the track, the information would be relayed on cue cards to Collins, and the reporters would be called upon to summarize the details of what had happened. A unique individual, Collins was characterized by his contemporaries as a perfectionist and a proud person. The Collins era was also noted for its popular culture and social appeal. Booth interviews with celebrities, politicians, advertisers, promoters, retired drivers, and other famous personalities in attendance were used to fill the downtime of the broadcast. On other occasions, telegrams might be received from celebrities listening at home, and Collins would read some of them on-air for the listeners. Starting in 1971, Collins made an effort to curtail booth interviews, in order to improve the flow of the race, and to assuage listeners' complaints. Collins also had a popular custom of signing-off the broadcast by reciting poetry or other literary vignettes.

When Paul Page entered the booth in 1977, he swiftly changed the face of the network, and in his own words, "brought the broadcast into the present tense." He turned the coverage into a true live, play-by-play, sporting event broadcast, similar to what had been used by Motor Racing Network, which had covered some NASCAR, USAC, and Formula One races on the radio at the time. He "locked the doors" of the broadcast booth, effectively eliminating the mundane celebrity interviews, and gave the turn reporters a higher level of play-by-play responsibility. With the help of technicians, Page invented a custom switchboard to facilitate the turn and pit reporters. Page himself donned a headset that had instant communication between himself and the turn reporters, and without hesitation, would throw the call to the turn reporters as he saw appropriate. By the mid-1980s, the radio booth was equipped with a television monitor which could pick up the ABC-TV raw satellite feed, which gave the announcers access to replays for the first time. The new improved style of broadcasting was well-received, and earned critical praise for the seamless around-the-track call of the 1982 finish.

During the years Bob Jenkins anchored the network, the quality of the broadcast continued to excel. Praised by members of his staff as always being well-prepared and in complete control of the broadcast, Jenkins' team was praised for their flawless call of the 1992 finish. One of the changes Jenkins made upon his arrival involved the coverage of the pre-race ceremonies. Previously, each segment of the pre-race ceremonies was formally introduced by one of the pit reporters. Jenkins ditched the separate radio introductions, and for continuity purposes, began simulcasting the Speedway's public address system for the duration of the pre-race. Jenkins also brought in a separate pit producer, to coordinate the pit reporters, a practice that is done by television, primarily by broadcasters who have radio experience. Later, Jenkins also began simulcasting the winner's interview in victory lane from ABC-TV, rather than wait for a separate radio interview, This allowed the radio audience to hear the first words spoken by the winner, increasing the spontaneity, and prevented the driver from having to repeat an entire interview for a second audience.

Jenkins enthusiastically served as chief announcer for nine years, but characterized the job as "complex" as well as physically and mentally "exhausting." One of Jenkins lasting contributions was the addition of the live talk show "Indy Live" in 1990. The program was carried by many of the affiliates, and featured interviews with drivers, and allowed listeners to call in and ask questions. Jenkins left after 1998 to work the race on ABC-TV for the next five years. Jenkins made a brief return to the radio crew as a turn reporter in 2007–2008, and as a booth analyst in 2009–2011, before permanently joining the Speedway public address announcing team until the end of 2019, when he was diagnosed with brain cancer that would lead to his death during the week of the NASCAR-INDYCAR doubleheader.

During the 2000s, with Mike King as anchor, several new personalities joined the crew. After King retired from the position, Page made a well-publicized return as chief announcer in 2014. When King arrived as the announcer in 1999, a trend returned to the broadcasts, not seen since the days of Sid Collins. King interviewed booth guests (celebrities, politicians, and sponsor representatives), whether live in-person, or pre-recorded. Paul Page has continued the practice. Starting in 2004, King also started having a radio reporter conduct a second radio-specific interview with the winner in victory lane, shortly after the television interview simulcast. After 2006, the simulcasted interview from the television broadcast was dropped entirely.

== On-air talent (Indianapolis 500) ==
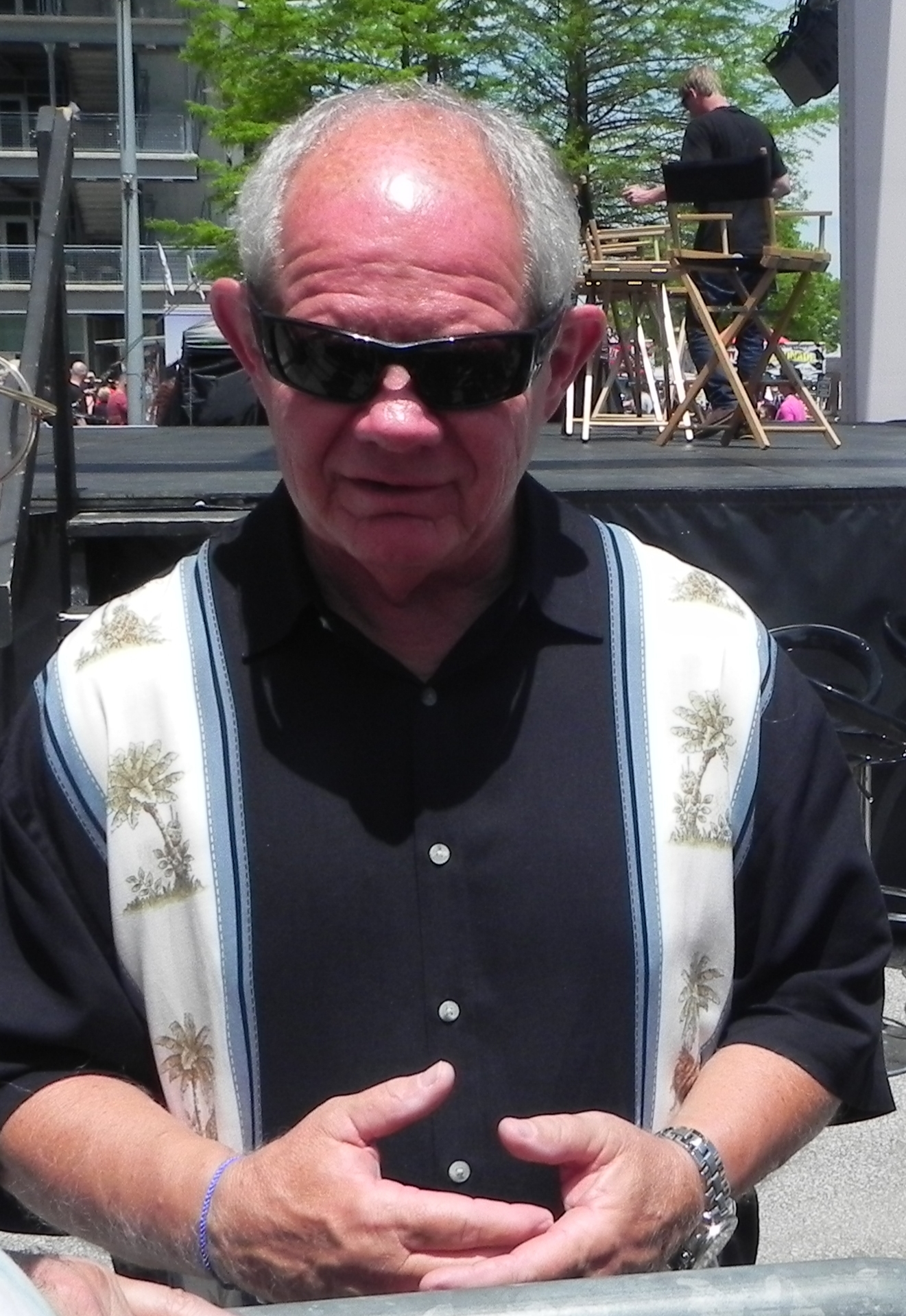
Paul Page, the Chief Announcer from 1977 to 1987, and again from 2014 to 2015.

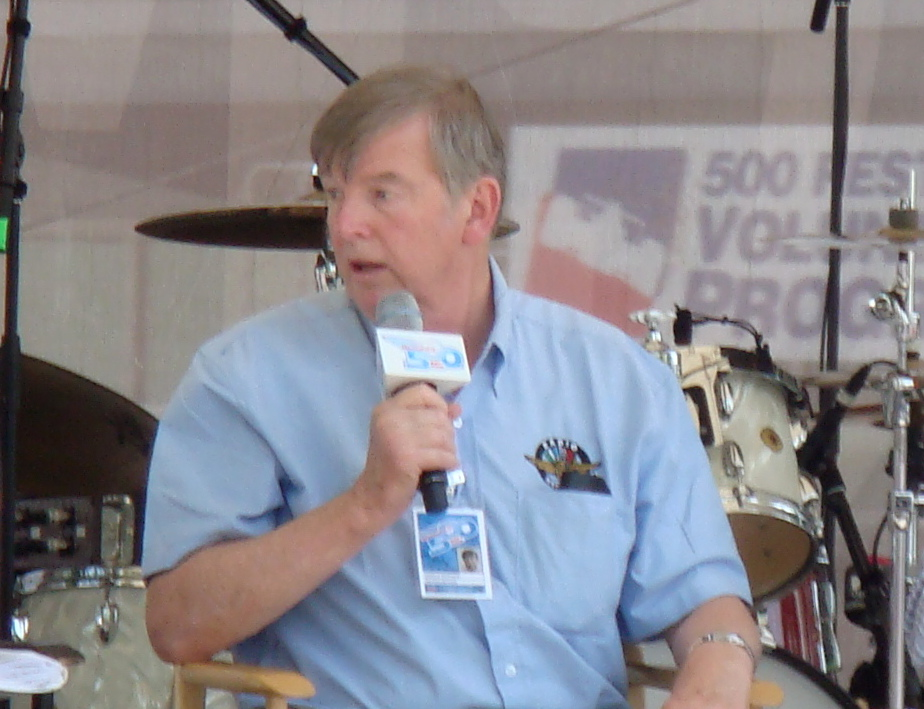
Historian Donald Davidson

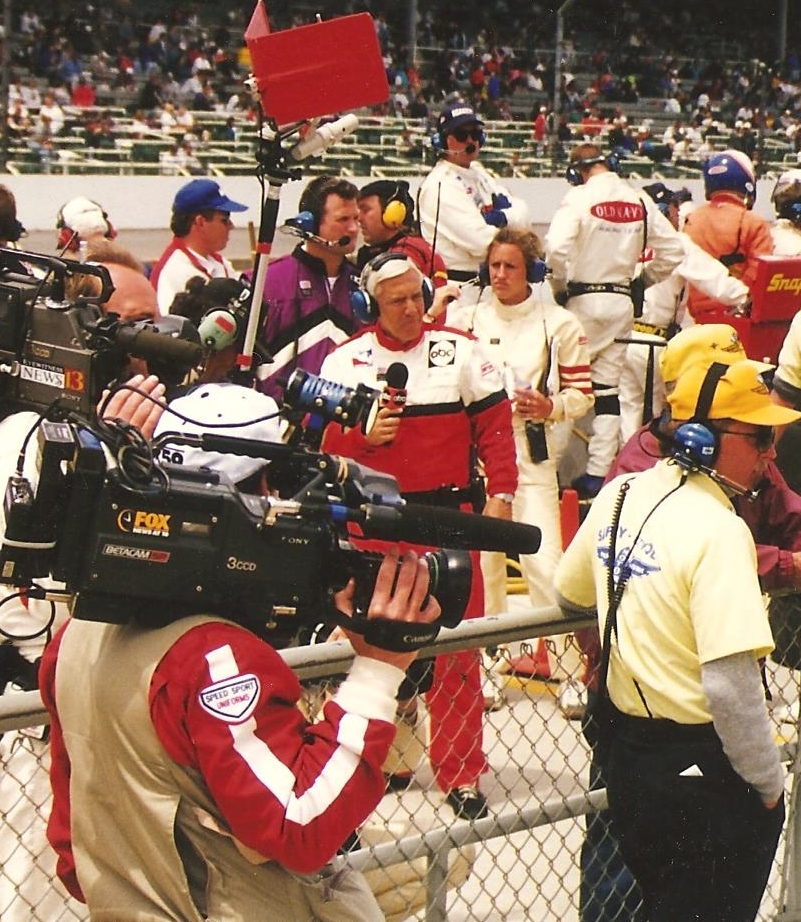
Gary Gerould

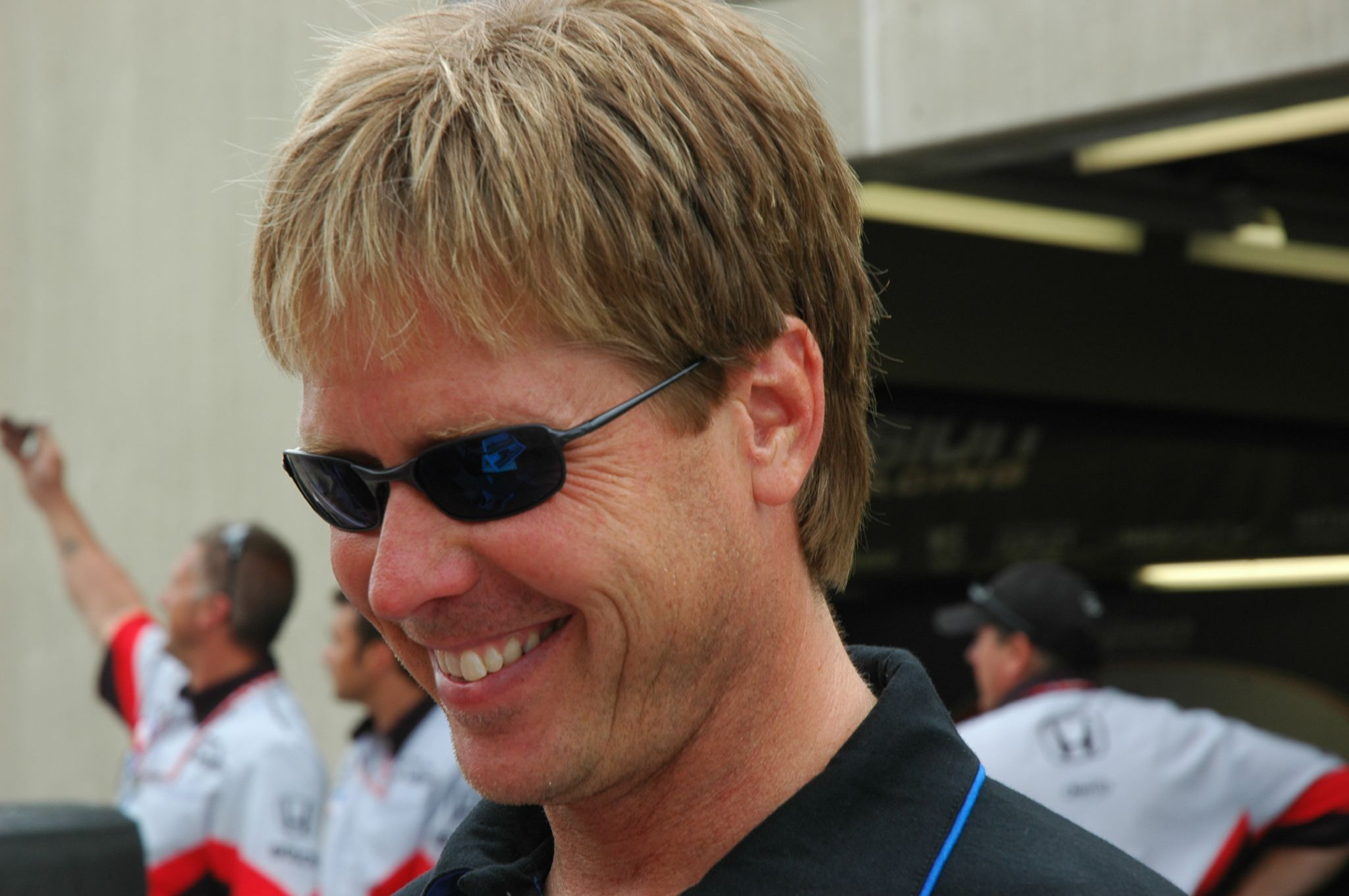
Davey Hamilton

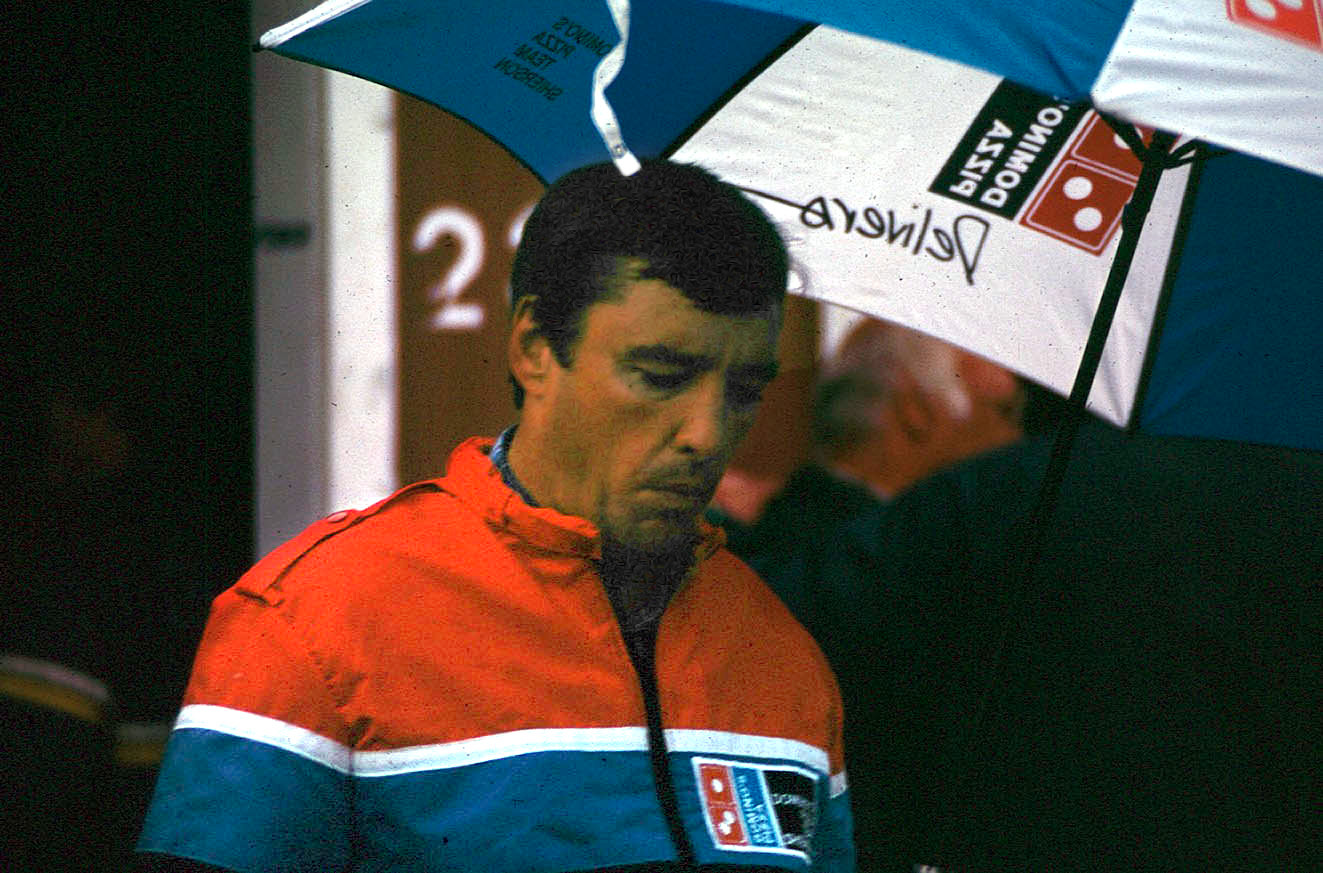
Johnny Rutherford

=== Booth and turn announcers ===
Prior to 1956, two roving turn reporters were typically utilized. One reporter would cover the "South Turns" (turn 1 and turn 2) and one reporter would cover the "North Turns" (turn 3 and turn 4). Starting in 1957, the crew was expanded to provide one reporter assigned to each of the four turns (plus the backstretch), for a total of five remote reporting locations. The backstretch reporting location was eliminated by the 1990s, and in some years in the 2010s, the turn one spot was left vacant.

Turn 1	Chief Announcer "Voice of the 500"	Turn 4
South turns: Easy Gwynn (1946); Mike Dunn (1947); Sid Collins (1948–1949); Easy Gwynn (1950); 1951: Not used; 1952 (unconfirmed); Bill Frosch (1953–1956); Turn 1: Bill Frosch (1957–1965); Mike Ahern (1966–1973); Ron Carrell (1974–1985); Jerry Baker (1986–2009); 2010: Not used; Jerry Baker (2011); 2012–2013: Not used; Jerry Baker (2014–2017); 2018: Not used; Nick Yeoman (2019–present)	Bill Slater (Mutual); Sid Collins (WIBC, 1951); Sid Collins (1952–1976); Paul Page (1977–1987); Lou Palmer (1988–1989); Bob Jenkins (1990–1998); Mike King (1999–2013); Paul Page (2014–2015); Mark Jaynes (2016–present)	North turns: Jim Shelton (1946–1953); Easy Gwynn (1954); Jim Shelton (1955–1956); Turn 4: Jim Shelton (1957–1978); Darl Wible (1979–1980); Bob Jenkins (1981–1989); Bob Lamey (1990–2000); Chris Denari (2001–2013); Kevin Lee (2014); Chris Denari (2015–2025); Ryan Myrehn (2026)
Turn 2	Backstretch	Turn 3
Bob Rhodes (1957–1958); John Peterson (1959–1960); Mike Ahern (1961); Howdy Bell (1962–1981); Doug Zink (1982–1984); Howdy Bell (1985–1987); Bob Lamey (1988–1989); Gary Lee (1990–1994); Ken Double (1995–2000); Kevin Lee (2001–2003); Adam Alexander (2004–2006); Bob Jenkins (2007–2008); Jake Query (2009–2015); Nick Yeoman (2016–2018); Michael Young (2019–present)	Jack Shapiro (1954–1955); Bernie Herman (1956–1963); Chuck Marlowe (1964); Ron Carrell (1965); Doug Zink (1966–1973); Jerry Baker (1974–1976); Darl Wible (1977–1978); Bob Jenkins (1979–1980); Larry Henry (1981); Howdy Bell (1982–1984); 1985–1988: Not used; Howdy Bell (1989–1990); 1991–2026: Not used	Robin Bright (1957); Lou Palmer (1958–1962); Mike Ahern (1963–1965); Ron Carrell (1966–1973); Doug Zink (1974–1981); Larry Henry (1982–1995); Gary Lee (1996–1998); Kevin O'Neal (1999); Mark Jaynes (2000–2015); Jake Query (2016–present)

=== Booth analysts ===
Driver Expert	Color Commentators
Mauri Rose (1955); Floyd Davis (1957); Fred Agabashian (1959–1965); Len Sutton (1966–1972); Fred Agabashian (1973–1977); Mike Hiss (1978); Billy Scott (1979); Rodger Ward (1980–1985); Gordon Johncock (1985); Bobby Unser (1986); Parnelli Jones (1987); Pancho Carter (1988); Johnny Rutherford (1989–1991); Derek Daly (1992); Johnny Rutherford (1993–2002); Johnny Parsons (2001–2002); Davey Hamilton (2003); Kenny Bräck (2004); Pancho Carter (2005); Davey Hamilton (2006); Johnny Parsons (2007–2009); James Hinchcliffe (2010); Kenny Bräck (2011); Davey Hamilton (2012–2013); Robbie Buhl (2014); Davey Hamilton (2015–2017); Anders Krohn (2018–2019); Davey Hamilton (2020–present); Anders Krohn (2025); Zach Veach (2025-present); Callum Ilott (2026)	Statistician; Charlie Brockman (1954–1963); John DeCamp (1964–1988); 1989–1990: Not used; Howdy Bell (1991–2000); 2001–2014: Not used; Dave Wilson (2015); 2016–2020: Not used; Historian; Donald Davidson (guest interview, 1964–2021); Analyst; Dave Wilson (2003–2008); Jerry Baker (2010, 2012–2013); Commentary; Chris Economaki (1995–2008); Bob Jenkins (2009–2011, 2016, 2018); Paul Page (2009–2013, 2016–2020); Mike King (2016–2018); Live In-Car reports; Davey Hamilton (2007–2011); Pippa Mann (2014); Social Media; Dave Wilson (2016)

=== Pit and garage area reporters ===
Pit Reporters (Current)	Pit Reporters (former)	Garage Area / Hospital reporters
Rob Blackman (2019–present); Alex Wollf (2021–present); Rich Nye (2024–present); Jonathan Grace(2026-present)	Carl Page; Gene Kelly; Normal Perry; Gordon Graham; Al Vare (1953); Dick Lingle (1954); Luke Walton (1953–1988); Pre-race only (1983–1988); Greg Smith (1955–1960); Jack Shapiro (1958–1964); Johny Peterson (1961–1962); Lou Palmer (1963–1987); Chuck Marlowe (1965–1988); Paul Page (1974–1976); Jerry Baker (1977–1985); Sally Larvick (1989–1995); Bob Forbes (1989–1995); Gary Gerould (1986–1989); Brian Hammons (1990–1994); Chris McClure (1991–1994); Gary Lee (1995); Mike King (1995–1998); Vince Welch (1996–1999); Mark Jaynes (1996–1999); Dave Calabro (1998)	Barry Lake, roving reporter (1947–1949); Bob Hoover (1958); Bob Forbes (1971–1988); Chuck Marlowe (1989–2003); Hospital: Howdy Bell (2001–2003); Kevin Olson (2005–2008); Dave Wilson (2009–2013, 2017–2019)
Pit Reporters (2000–2023)		Victory Lane
Larry Rice (2000); Chris Denari (1999–2000); Mike Lewis (2000–2001); Kim Morris (2001–2004); Adam Alexander (2001–2003); Jim Murphy (2002–2004); Dave Argabright (2004–2012); Nicole Manske (2005–2007); Kevin Olson (2005–2009); Jake Query (2007–2008); Katie Hargitt (2013); Dave Wilson (2014); Doug Rice (2015); Nick Yeoman (2010–2015); Michael Young (2011–2018); Dave Furst (2013–2020); Kevin Lee (2004–2013, 2015–2017); Rob Howden (2016–2020); Scott Sander (2021–2023); Ryan Myrehn (2018–2025)		Sid Collins (1950–1951); Gordon Graham (1952); Sid Collins (1953); Charlie Brockman (1954–1957); Luke Walton (1960); Johny Peterson (1961); Lou Palmer (1963–1987); Bob Forbes (1988–1992); ABC-TV simulcast; Jack Arute (1993–1998); Gary Gerould (1999); Jack Arute (2000–2003); Dr. Jerry Punch (2004); Jack Arute (2005–2006); Jim Murphy (2004); Nicole Manske (2005); Kevin Lee (2006–2011); Nick Yeoman (2012–2015); Michael Young (2016–2018); Dave Furst (2019–2020); Ryan Myrehn (2021–2025); Alex Wolff(2026-present)
Larry Rice (2000); Chris Denari (1999–2000); Mike Lewis (2000–2001); Kim Morris (2001–2004); Adam Alexander (2001–2003); Jim Murphy (2002–2004); Dave Argabright (2004–2012); Nicole Manske (2005–2007); Kevin Olson (2005–2009); Jake Query (2007–2008); Katie Hargitt (2013); Dave Wilson (2014); Doug Rice (2015); Nick Yeoman (2010–2015); Michael Young (2011–2018); Dave Furst (2013–2020); Kevin Lee (2004–2013, 2015–2017); Rob Howden (2016–2020); Scott Sander (2021–2023); Ryan Myrehn (2018–2025)	Interviews	
Larry Rice (2000); Chris Denari (1999–2000); Mike Lewis (2000–2001); Kim Morris (2001–2004); Adam Alexander (2001–2003); Jim Murphy (2002–2004); Dave Argabright (2004–2012); Nicole Manske (2005–2007); Kevin Olson (2005–2009); Jake Query (2007–2008); Katie Hargitt (2013); Dave Wilson (2014); Doug Rice (2015); Nick Yeoman (2010–2015); Michael Young (2011–2018); Dave Furst (2013–2020); Kevin Lee (2004–2013, 2015–2017); Rob Howden (2016–2020); Scott Sander (2021–2023); Ryan Myrehn (2018–2025)	Paula Carr (1954); Sally Larvick (1982–1988)	

== Indianapolis 500 On-air crews and broadcast details by year ==
- 1920s: 1928 • 1929
- 1940s: 1946 • 1947 • 1948 • 1949
- 1950s: 1950 • 1951 • 1952 • 1953 • 1954 • 1955 • 1956 • 1957 • 1958 • 1959
- 1960s: 1960 • 1961 • 1962 • 1963 • 1964 • 1965 • 1966 • 1967 • 1968 • 1969
- 1970s: 1970 • 1971 • 1972 • 1973 • 1974 • 1975 • 1976 • 1977 • 1978 • 1979
- 1980s: 1980 • 1981 • 1982 • 1983 • 1984 • 1985 • 1986 • 1987 • 1988 • 1989
- 1990s: 1990 • 1991 • 1992 • 1993 • 1994 • 1995 • 1996 • 1997 • 1998 • 1999
- 2000s: 2000 • 2001 • 2002 • 2003 • 2004 • 2005 • 2006 • 2007 • 2008 • 2009
- 2010s: 2010 • 2011 • 2012 • 2013 • 2014 • 2015 • 2016 • 2017 • 2018 • 2019
- 2020s: 2020 • 2021 • 2022 • 2023 • 2024 • 2025

== Brickyard 400 & Lilly Diabetes 250 on-air talent ==
- John Andretti
- Jerry Baker
- Chuck Carland
- Donald Davidson
- Chris Denari
- Dave Despain
- Ken Double
- Chris Economaki
- Mark Garrow
- Brad Gillie
- Ned Jarrett
- Mike Joy
- Jeff Hammond
- Larry Henry
- Mark Jaynes
- Glenn Jarrett
- Bob Jenkins
- John Kernan
- Mike King
- Bob Lamey
- Gary Lee
- Kevin Lee
- Mike Lewis
- Chris McClure
- Brett McMillan
- Ryan Myrehn
- Kevin Olson
- Pat Patterson
- Jake Query
- Doug Rice
- Ralph Sheheen
- Vince Welch
- Nick Yeoman

== Technical staff ==
Selected technical and administrative staff for the IMS Radio Network, past and present.

- Tom Allebrandi
- Tom Allebrandi II
- Russ Arnold
- Gil Berry
- Norm Birnbaum
- Tom Borgioli
- Bill Dean
- Rick Evans
- Elmer George
- Bill Fleetemeyer & Bill Lamb
- John Fugate
- Ted Harding
- Kurt Hunt
- Paul Leavitt
- Wally Leavitt
- Brian Livingston
- Jack Morrow
- Chris Pollock
- John Royer
- Tom Schoeller
- John Walters

== Notes ==
=== Works cited ===
- Mutual Radio Network: Indianapolis 500 Radio Broadcasts (1946, 1947, 1949, 1950)
- Indianapolis Motor Speedway Radio Network: Indianapolis 500 Radio Broadcasts (1953–1955, 1958, 1960–2014)
- Van Camp's Pork & Beans Presents: Great Moments From the Indy 500 – Fleetwood Sounds, 1975
- IndyCar Radio official website
- Indiana Broadcast Pioneers – Hall of Fame
- 1977 Carl Hungness Indianapolis 500 Yearbook, pg. 134–135
