= Jerry Baker (announcer) =

American sports announcer

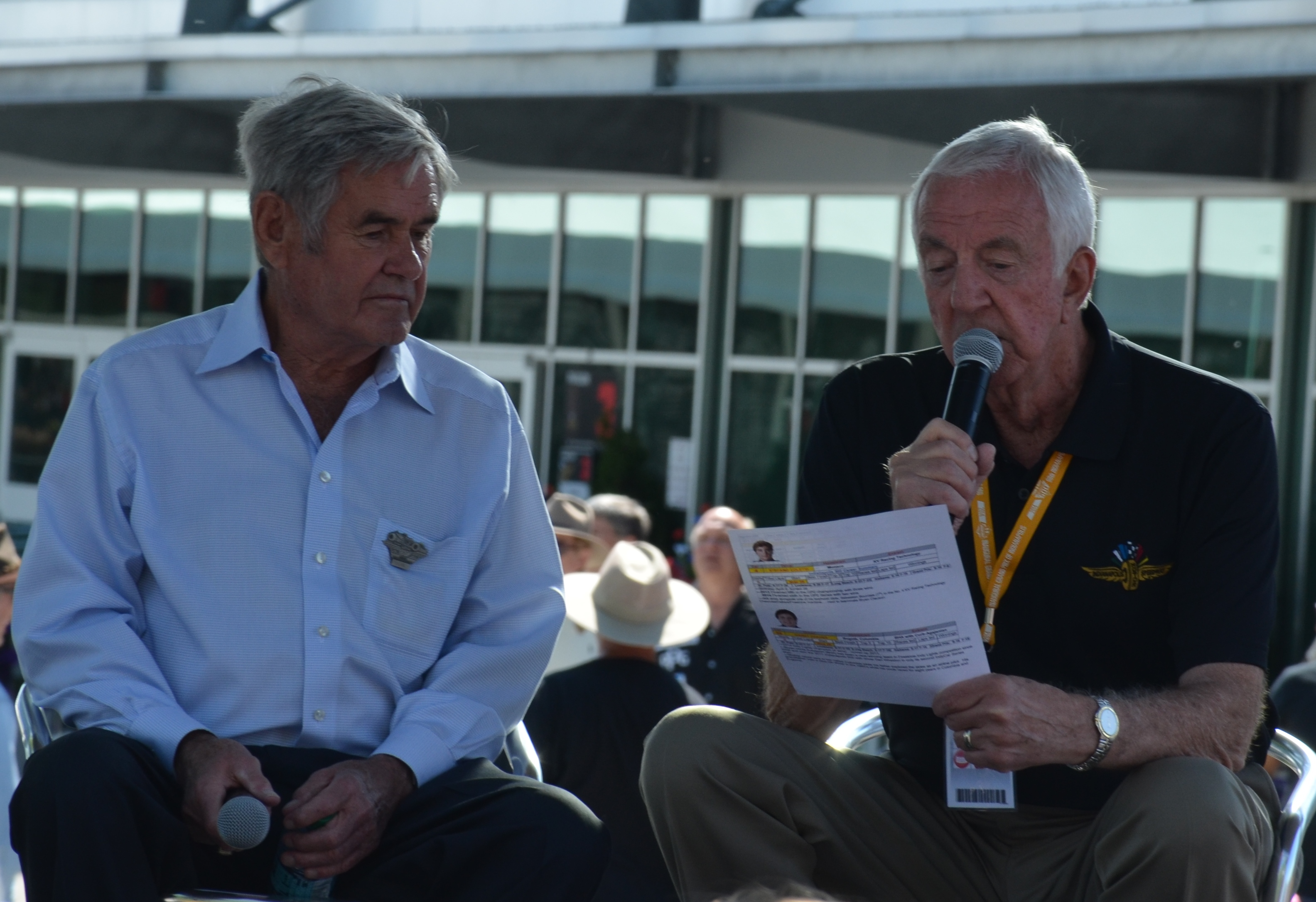
Jerry Baker (right) interviewing Al Unser at the 2015 Indianapolis 500.

Jerry Baker is well known as a veteran sports announcer in Indiana. He is known as the voice of the Indiana High School Athletic Association (IHSAA) Basketball State Championships on television having served as the anchor announcer for nearly 30 years. He is the former voice of the Indiana Pacers and currently is a reporter for the Indy Racing League (IRL), and the Brickyard 400. He has long held the position as the turn 1 announcer on the Indianapolis Motor Speedway Radio Network during the airing of the Indianapolis 500. Baker was most recently was the play-by-play announcer for HomeTown Sports and News (HTSN) on Friday nights on WRTV digital side channel 6.2 and Hometown Sports Indiana.

Baker is a member of the Indiana Basketball Hall of Fame, inducted as a contributor (broadcaster). He is a native of Sullivan, Indiana and holds a degree in Broadcasting from Indiana State University. He and his wife Ramona, are residents of Indianapolis, Indiana.

During his duties on the IMS Radio Network, Baker has on occasion, used his wife Ramona as his spotter/assistant.

On October 5, 2017, Jerry was announced as the PA announcer for the Indiana Pacers
