= Sid Collins (broadcaster) =

American sportscaster

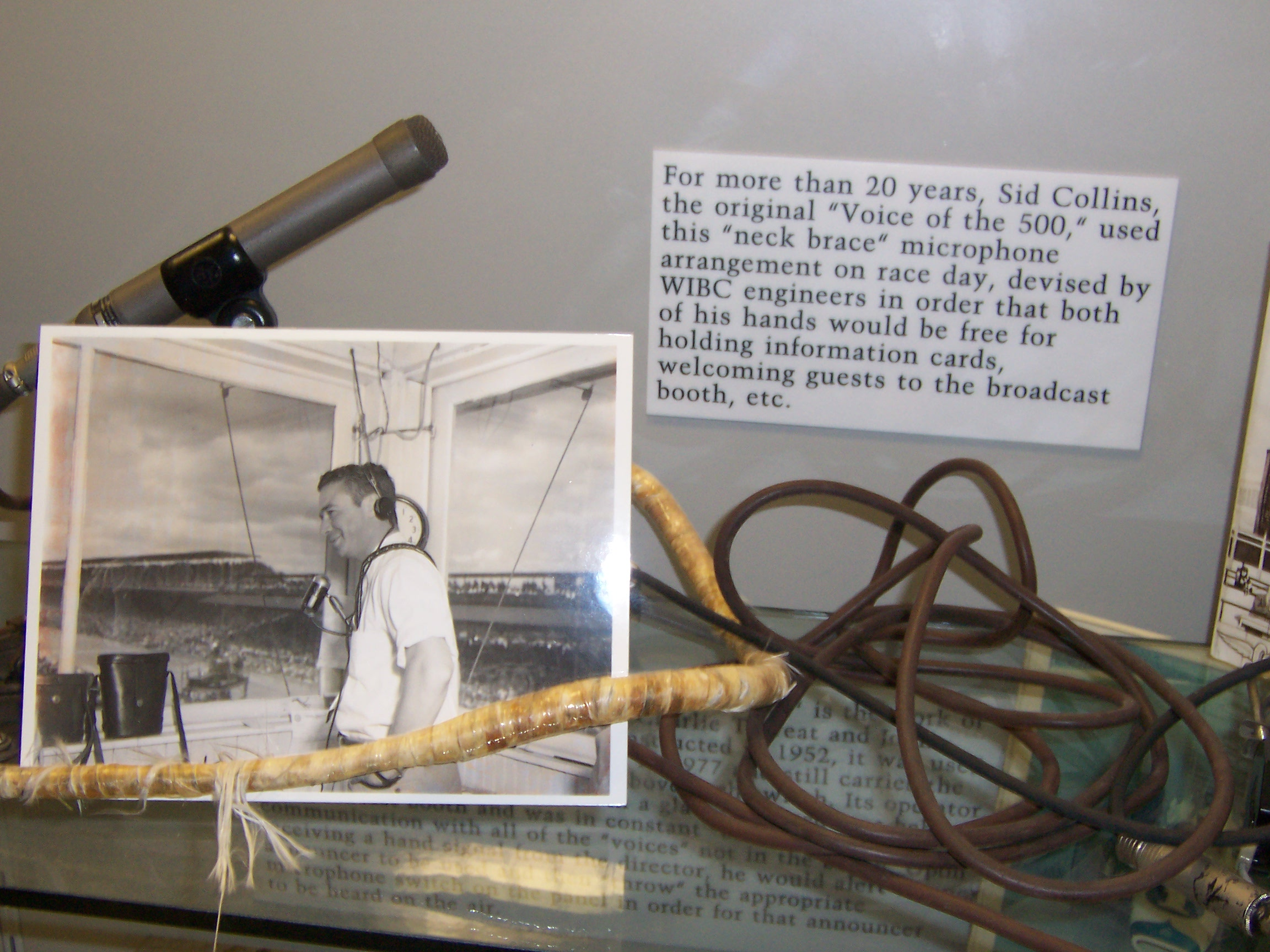
- Sid Collins exhibit at the Indianapolis Motor Speedway Hall of Fame Museum
- Born: Sidney Cahn Jr. July 17, 1922; Indianapolis, Indiana, U.S.
- Died: May 2, 1977 (aged 54); Indianapolis, Indiana, U.S.
- Occupations: Sportscaster, broadcaster
- Years active: 1952–1976
- Known for: Radio voice of the Indianapolis 500-Mile Race on the Indianapolis Motor Speedway Radio Network

Sid Collins (born Sidney Cahn Jr.) (July 17, 1922 – May 2, 1977) was an American broadcaster best known as the radio voice of the Indianapolis 500-Mile Race on the Indianapolis Motor Speedway Radio Network from 1952 to 1976. Collins coined the phrase describing the annual May motorsports event as "the greatest spectacle in racing".

== Background ==
Born into a Jewish family that owned a neighborhood store in Indianapolis, Indiana, Cahn changed his professional name to Collins for fear of antisemitism and discrimination in his chosen field of broadcasting.

== Announcing ==
Collins worked for WIBC in Indianapolis. One year after he started at the 50,000-watt station, he became the Indianapolis Motor Speedway (IMS) track announcer for the south turn. He became a radio announcer for the track after Bill Slater became ill. He was named the chief announcer in 1952. That year he introduced his "full coverage concept", which replaced a five-minute rundown each hour. He sent letters to all of the radio stations on their network, but only 26 stations participated. The next year 110 stations participated and the number grew until it became 1,200 by 1980.

With live television coverage of the race prohibited until 1986, Collins' radio coverage drew a large audience every year, and his announcing as the "voice of the 500" became synonymous with the race itself. By 1976, it was estimated that the radio broadcast reached 100 million listeners on 1,200 stations worldwide. He told the world the deaths, accidents, incidents, and crashes during the race. Collins received over 30,000 letters asking for a copy of the eulogy that he gave about Eddie Sachs after Sachs died in a crash on the second lap of the 1964 Indianapolis 500.

Collins also anchored TVS Television Network auto racing from Trenton, Milwaukee, WI, Langhorne PA, and Castle Rock, CO for two years. He hosted national TV coverage of the Indianapolis 500 Festival Parade with Garry Moore, Steve Allen, and Bob Barker for Hughes Sports Network. He was the subject of stories in Hot Rod magazine and The Saturday Evening Post.

== Death ==
Collins began suffering muscle spasms and pain in his thighs in February 1975. He also underwent foot surgery in 1975. After tests, Collins was diagnosed with a disc pressing against his spine and underwent surgery that involved cutting through his throat. His larynx was not harmed and he returned to broadcasting for the 1976 Indianapolis 500. Collins navigated the Speedway in 1976 with the use of a golf cart and a cane.

In April 1977, Collins was diagnosed at the Mayo Clinic with amyotrophic lateral sclerosis (ALS) or Lou Gehrig's disease. After learning he had the incurable progressive paralyzing disease, Collins confided to friend and Indianapolis 500 anchor successor Paul Page that he was planning to take his own life. Collins committed suicide on May 2, 1977. He was 54. Collins had been scheduled to announce his 30th Indianapolis 500 on May 29.

Collins left an 11-minute audio tape as a suicide note that he intended to be aired during the broadcast of the 1977 Indianapolis 500. In the first eight minutes, he described his two-year battle against the progression of ALS and the pain it brought him. He spoke of how proud he was to have been the Voice of the 500. In the final three minutes of the recording, Collins read from the Bible, the entire third chapter of the book of Ecclesiastes, which states "there is a time for everything... a time to be born and a time to die," before ending his message, "My time has come."

Paul Page, Collins' successor as The Voice of the 500, declined to air the tape he left. "It felt very personal to me." "I'm sure his purpose was to prove (to his listeners) that he had done everything he could. But I don't think anyone questioned Sid's personal level of courage. If anything, at the funeral home, it was more like 'Thank God he is at rest.' Because he was totally tormented by this (disease)."

== Awards ==
Collins received nine American Auto Racing Writers & Broadcasters Association awards as the best auto racing broadcaster in the nation. He was cited by the Indiana University radio/TV school as an outstanding graduate and was inducted into the Indiana Journalism Hall of Fame in 1979. He was inducted into the Motorsports Hall of Fame of America in 2011.

Preceded by Bill Slater	Radio voice of the Indianapolis 500; 1952–1976	Succeeded by Paul Page
