= Dave Wilson (radio personality) =

American radio personality

Dave "The King" Wilson is an American radio personality based in Indianapolis, Indiana. He hosted the afternoon Dave Wilson Show on 93.1 WIBC, (formerly 1070 AM-WIBC), an Emmis Communications station, in Indianapolis until let go in March 2009. Wilson is also a member of the Indianapolis Motor Speedway Radio Network.

Wilson earned the nickname "The King" from his work on The Bob & Tom Show, in which his character was "The King", modeled after Elvis Presley. He was once the traveling partner with rising comic Jay Leno. Leno called Wilson "The Viking Comic" referring to his large physical size and beard.

Wilson owned One Liner's Comedy club in Greenwood, Indiana, a popular Indianapolis Comedy club and restaurant. The club was also known for an airplane sticking out of its roof. It was closed in 2008.

== Indianapolis Motor Speedway Radio Network broadcasting duties ==
- Indianapolis 500
  - 2003-2008: Booth analyst
  - 2009-2013: Garage area / infield hospital reporter
  - 2014: Pit reporter (north pits)
  - 2015: Statistician
  - 2016: Social media
  - 2017-2019: Garage area / infield hospital reporter
