= NASCAR on ESPN =

US television program

- Also known as: NASCAR on ABC
- Genre: Auto racing telecasts
- Presented by: Allen Bestwick; Dale Jarrett; Andy Petree (for other reporters and staff, see announcers section below)
- Opening theme: "Last Man Standing" by Trailer Choir (2009); Back in the Saddle by Aerosmith (2007–2008)
- Country of origin: United States
- Original language: English

Production
- Production location: Various NASCAR venues
- Camera setup: Multi-camera
- Running time: 3–5 hours (depending on race length)
- Production companies: ABC Sports (1961–2000); ESPN (1981–2000, 2007–2014); ESPN on ABC (2007–2014)

Original release
- Network: ABC; ESPN; ESPN2; ESPNEWS; ESPN Classic
- Release: March 1, 1981 – November 20, 2000
- Release: July 23, 2007 – November 16, 2014

Related
- NASCAR Now; NASCAR Countdown; NASCAR Drivers: Non-Stop; ESPN2 Garage; NASCAR in Primetime

NASCAR on ESPN is the now-defunct former package and branding of coverage of NASCAR races on ESPN, ESPN2, and ABC. ABC, and later the ESPN family of networks, carried NASCAR events from the sanctioning body's top three divisions at various points from the early 1960s until 2000, after the Truck Series rights were lost. However, ESPN resumed coverage of NASCAR with the Nationwide Series race at Daytona in February 2007 and the then-Nextel Cup Series at Indianapolis in July 2007. ESPN's final race was the Ford EcoBoost 400 at the Homestead–Miami Speedway on November 16, 2014, with Kevin Harvick winning that year's NASCAR Sprint Cup Series championship.

== History ==
=== 1961–2000: ABC ===
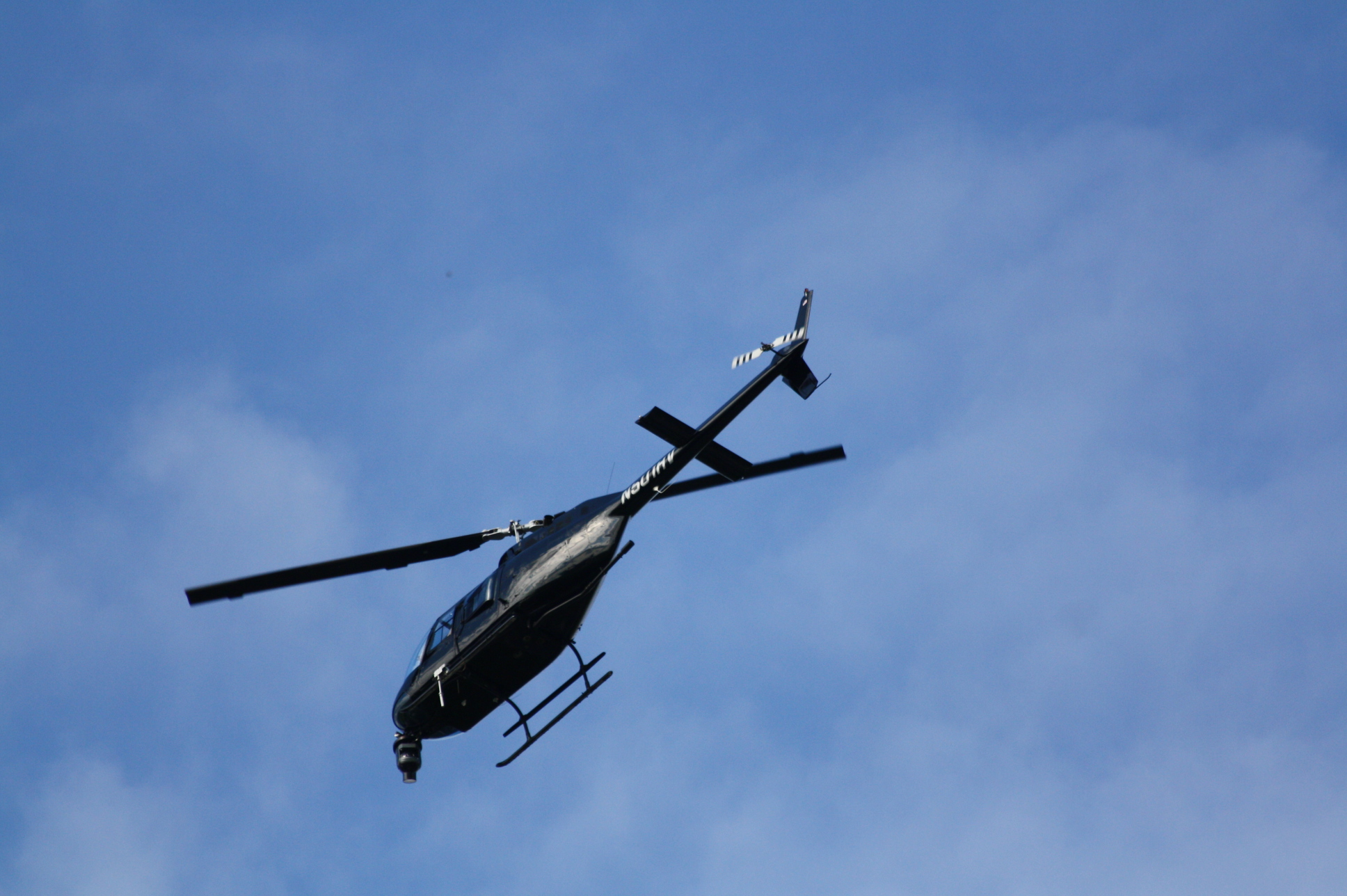
ESPN helicopter

ABC's involvement with NASCAR began in the days of ABC's Wide World of Sports in the 1960s, in which it presented some of the biggest races in stock car racing. One of its events was the Daytona 500. ABC showed the last half of the race, except in 1976, when it showed the first 30 laps, went to the Olympics and then came back for the wild finish, in which David Pearson edged out Richard Petty with both cars sliding sideways across the track. The race television rights went to CBS Sports in 1979, who reportedly pioneered live flag-to-flag NASCAR race coverage. For much of the 1970s and 1980s, ABC broadcast NASCAR races on tape delay. The commentary was added later in post production. They would actually sit in the booth and call something live if they needed to for the satellite feed. Otherwise, ABC would do all the editing afterwards for the final telecast.

=== 1981–2000: ESPN ===
ESPN began showing NASCAR races in 1981, with the first event being at North Carolina Speedway. The last of its 265 Cup telecasts (that number includes some on ABC Sports) was the 2000 NAPA 500 in Atlanta (now the Folds of Honor QuikTrip 500). Even though Fox, FX, NBC, and TNT were the exclusive broadcasters of the Winston/Nextel Cup Series and the Busch Series from 2001 to 2006, the ESPN networks still carried the Craftsman Truck Series in 2001 and 2002 because the Truck races were under a separate contract; ESPN had been broadcasting Truck races since the inaugural race in 1995. Speed Channel took over the Truck broadcasts in 2003.

=== 2007–2014 ===
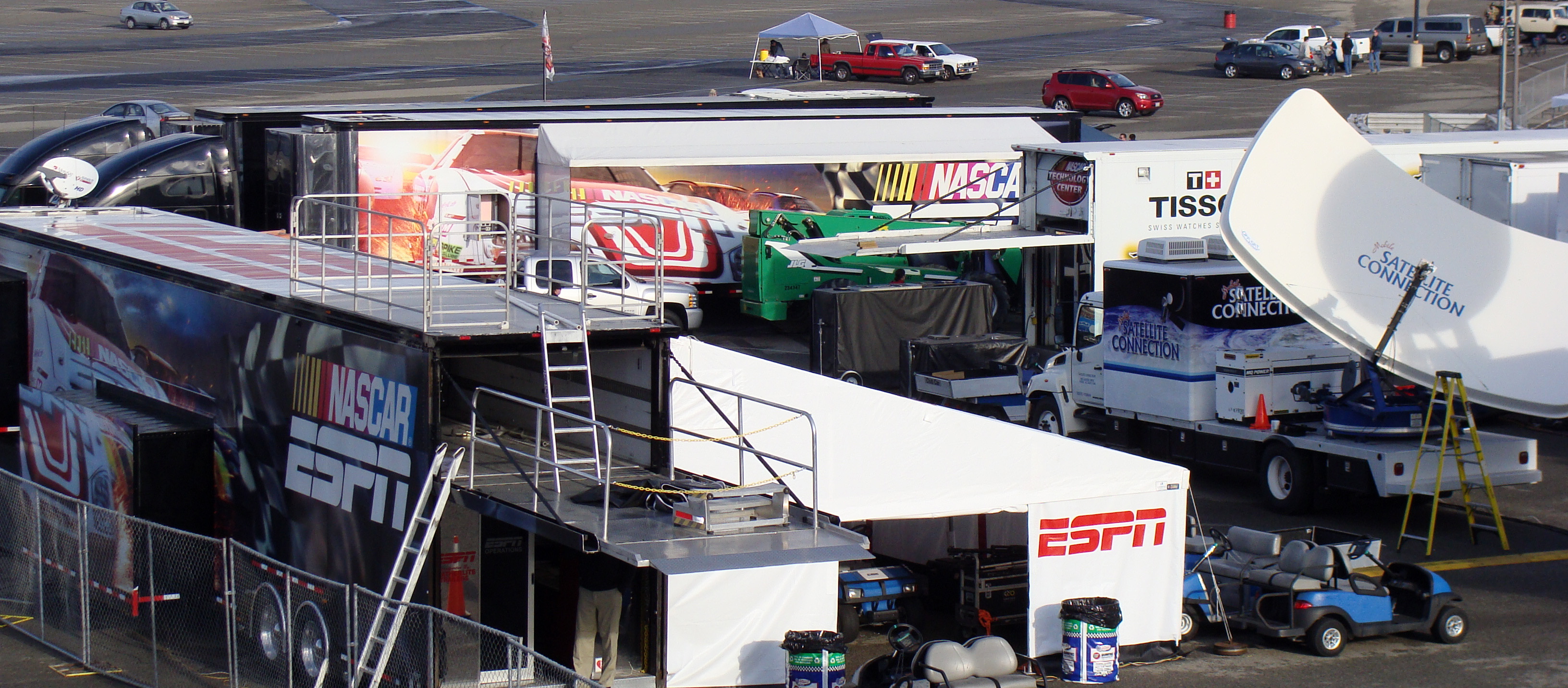
The ESPN media compound at Auto Club Speedway in 2010

The television show promo of NASCAR on ESPN, ESPN2 and ABC in 2007 can be seen as a sneak peek in the 2006 Disney/Pixar animated film Cars on DVD and VHS in the 2.39:1 widescreen and 1.33:1 fullscreen versions. ESPN (and ABC) regained rights to air NASCAR races in 2007 after NBC Sports dropped NASCAR at the end of 2006. Each race telecast began with the pre-race show NASCAR Countdown. As of the 2011 season Nicole Briscoe was the usual host, with Brad Daugherty and Rusty Wallace providing commentary. It was typically 1 hour for Sprint Cup and major Nationwide races and a half-hour for all other Nationwide races. In addition to the races, ESPN2 aired a daily show called NASCAR Now, which was similar to Baseball Tonight and NFL Primetime. It aired daily on ESPN2 and was hosted by Briscoe, with various others substituting. Unlike other league shows on ESPN such as NFL Live, Baseball Tonight, and College Football Live, NASCAR Now only aired during the NASCAR season.

In 2007, 29 of the 35 Busch races aired on ESPN2, with the other six airing on ABC. ESPN2 started its coverage with the Orbitz 300 at Daytona International Speedway on February 17, 2007. ABC's first race was the Sam's Town 300 at Las Vegas on March 10. The first NEXTEL Cup race telecast was the Brickyard 400 on July 29 on ESPN. The next 5 races aired on ESPN and the Richmond race and the final 10 races (the Chase for the NEXTEL Cup) appeared on ABC.

The initial broadcast team consisted of Jerry Punch as the lead announcer with Wallace and Andy Petree as analysts. Allen Bestwick, Mike Massaro, Jamie Little, and Dave Burns were the pit reporters. Brent Musburger, Suzy Kolber, and Chris Fowler contributed as studio hosts.

In 2008, ESPN moved Wallace and Bestwick from their positions. Bestwick became studio host while Wallace joined the studio team. Dale Jarrett, who had retired during the 2008 season and had worked part-time for the network afterward, joined Punch and Petree as booth analyst. Shannon Spake replaced Bestwick on pit road.

In 2009, the Monday edition of NASCAR Now became a roundtable show, similar to the old Inside NEXTEL Cup show that was on Speed Channel. Bestwick hosts the roundtable; he is also the former host of the Speed Channel program. The panelists rotate and have included Mike Massaro, Johnny Benson, Boris Said, Ray Evernham, and Ricky Craven. Massaro has also filled in as host, including after the 2010 Daytona 500. Beginning with the 2010 season, ESPN carried fourteen of the seventeen races, including the entire Chase for the Sprint Cup except for the Bank of America 500 which continued to be televised on ABC. ABC acquired the Irwin Tools Night Race and kept the Air Guard 400 as part of its race coverage. Previously, ABC aired the entire Chase for the Sprint Cup and the Richmond race (now known as the Federated Auto Parts 400), but NASCAR's decision to standardize early start times conflicted with ABC's expanding Sunday morning political talk show lineup. This led to consternation among ABC's Southern affiliates, who counted on the races as a bulwark against NFL games on competing CBS and Fox stations. This decision was in-line with ESPN taking over the rights to the Rose Bowl and the British Open as part of an ongoing strategy to shift sports programming from ABC to ESPN, to the outrage of many sports fans.

The ESPN family of networks continued to be exclusive home for almost every NASCAR Nationwide Series event. 22 of those races were on ESPN2, with ABC carrying four and ESPN nine. Marty Reid, who for the past several seasons was the lead play-by-play announcer for Indy Racing League events on the ESPN family of networks, became its lead NASCAR voice for the 2010 season replacing Jerry Punch. Andy Petree and Dale Jarrett returned as color commentators, while Punch moved to lead pit reporter. The April 2011 race from Richmond International Raceway was produced and broadcast by SPEED due to conflicts with the NFL draft and the NBA Playoffs which are also broadcast by ESPN. The April 2013 and April 2014 Richmond races had the same conflicts, but in those years were carried on ESPNews.

=== The end of NASCAR's 30-year run on ESPN ===
On November 16, 2014, the Ford EcoBoost 400 at Homestead-Miami Speedway marked the end of NASCAR's 30-year, to-stint run on ESPN, dating back to 1981 and also, ending an eight-year stint with the network since 2007. Allen Bestwick, who served as lap-by-lap announcer for ESPN's Sprint Cup Series races since 2011, worked his final NASCAR broadcast on network television, marking the end of his role with the network in 29 years covering the sport and remained with ESPN and ABC covering IndyCar races from 2015 to 2018.

"We look forward to continuing to cover the sport on SportsCenter next and at Daytona and more going down the road. Now for Bob Jenkins and Larry Nuber, for Benny Parsons and Ned Jarrett, for Dale Jarrett and Andy Petree, Allen Bestwick, so long from Homestead."

— Allen Bestwick's call for the final NASCAR race on ESPN.

== Production ==
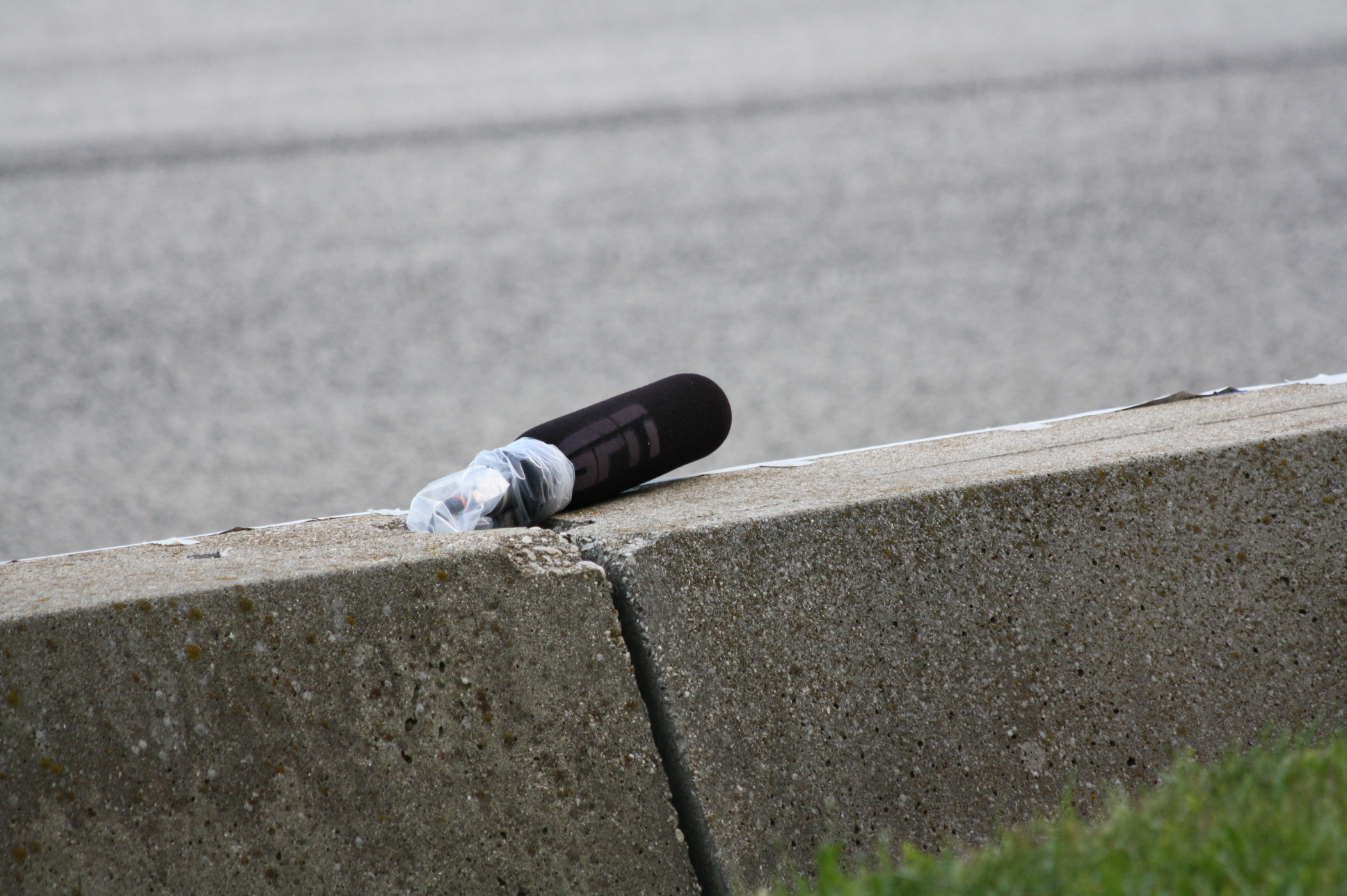
ESPN microphone

Each broadcast began with NASCAR Countdown, ESPN's pre-race show. Using a mobile pit studio similar to FOX's Hollywood Hotel, the pre-race was typically led by host Nicole Briscoe with Brad Daugherty and Rusty Wallace. Daugherty and Wallace may be absent for weekends of Nationwide-only races, and Wallace occasionally moved to the broadcast booth for Nationwide races. The studio was not used at Nationwide races where ESPN was responsible for both the Sprint Cup and Nationwide Series races at two different tracks. The studio had not been used at Road America events where ESPN had brought a skeleton crew since the race was ESPN's only broadcast of the weekend due to the Little League World Series. The pre-race show was 30 minutes for Nationwide races and an hour for Sprint Cup races. Cuts to commercials saw a plastic NASCAR Countdown logo in city attractions outside the track.

Practice and qualifying session broadcasts also originated from the studio and drivers would occasionally enter the studio during qualifying to preview their runs. Sprint Cup drivers had also been seen in the booth to commentate on Nationwide races.

All races were presented in high-definition, and all cameras, including those in the race cars, were capable of sending out HD pictures. Starting in 2011, in-car cameras were able to provide two camera angles instead of just one.

At the Bashas' Supermarkets 200 at Phoenix International Raceway on April 20, 2007, NASCAR on ESPN unveiled a new feature, "Full Throttle". In this feature, which took place on one restart a race, the audio was provided by various team communications between drivers, crew chiefs, and spotters, similar to Fox's "Crank it Up". Typically, this lasted for about one lap. This frequency had been reduced from its earlier use, and was not seen at all in 2011.

Also in 2011, NASCAR on ESPN switched to a 16:9 aspect ratio letterbox presentation, matching that of Fox. This letterbox presentation, which was seen on ESPN and ESPN2, was not seen on Nationwide and Sprint Cup Series races aired on ABC, which still showed the race in the 4:3 standard-definition, non-letterbox format.

When NASCAR returned to ESPN in 2007, the starting grid was shown scrolling across the top of the screen, and it was not discussed. The time was instead used for ESPN's "In-Race Reporter" segment, in which fan questions were asked to drivers over the radio. Fox also used this tactic at the time (doing pit reports over the starting grid), an idea used by Fox from 2004–2008. However, while Fox switched back to traditional starting grids in 2009 and discussing them, ESPN continued using the scrolling grid throughout its entire run. On two occasions, ESPN did run a traditional starting grid with drivers' full names and talked about the grid. These occasions were the 2007 Busch Series race at Mexico City, in which many of the drivers were not regular NASCAR drivers and background information was warranted, and the 2014 season finale at Homestead-Miami, which was ESPN's final NASCAR broadcast.

=== The pit studio ===
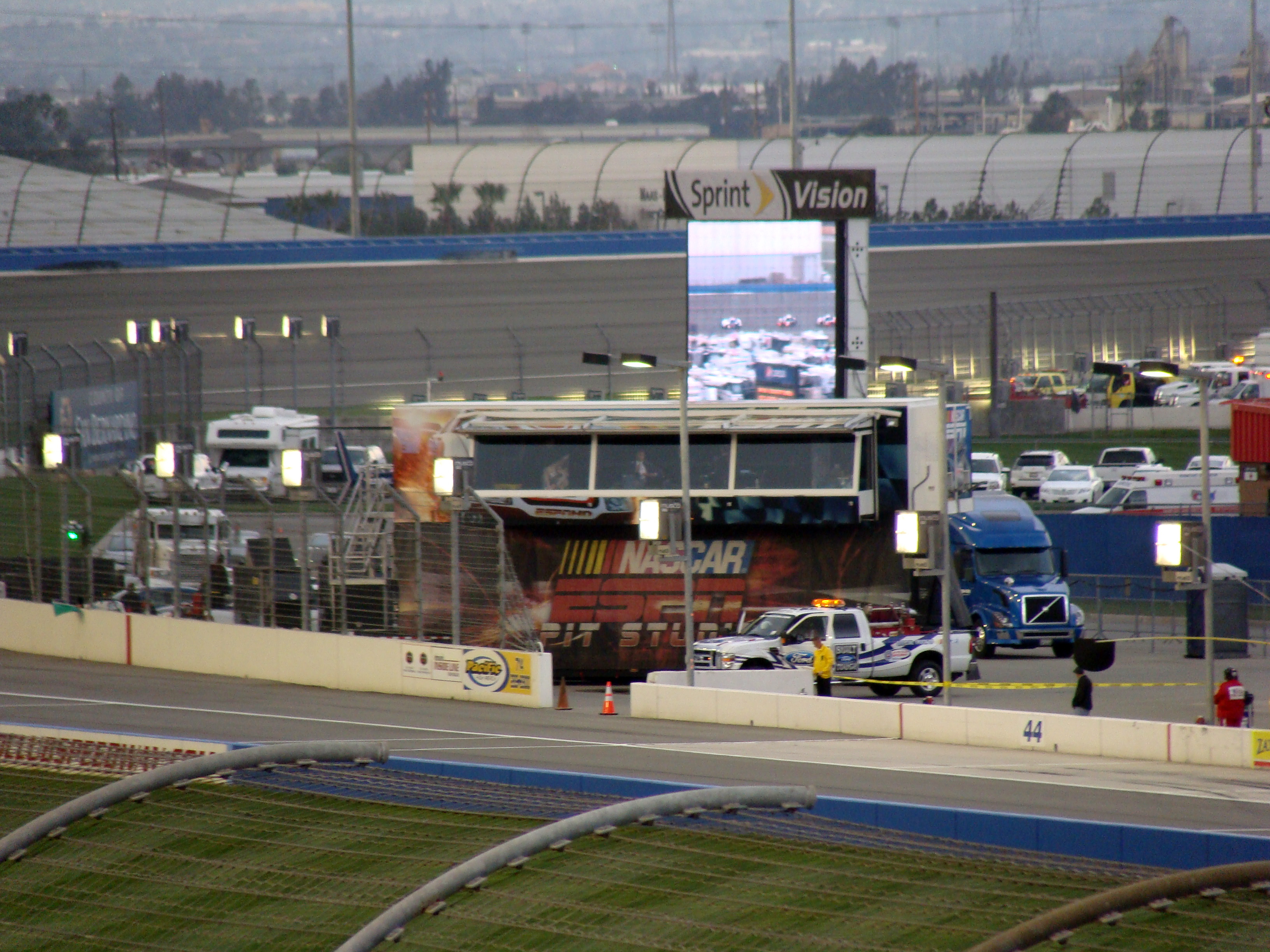
The ESPN pit studio at Auto Club Speedway during the 2010 Auto Club 500 weekend

The ESPN pit studio was one of the most technologically advanced mobile studios in all of sports. It was the size of a big-rig trailer and weighed 78,000 pounds (35,000 kg). The interior was 12 feet (3.7 m) wide and held five production crew members, three robotic cameras and the on-air hosts. The entire studio could be elevated 14 feet (4.3 m) and had 30 feet (9.1 m) of glass so the hosts and the fans could see the track. In 2008, the studio was re-decorated and used by ABC News to cover the New Hampshire presidential primary. The studio also used state-of-the-art LED lighting to light up the hosts.

== Coverage and other controversies ==
=== General ===
Many visitors to forums and blogs such as The Daly Planet complained that the coverage seen on ESPN and its related networks between 2007 and 2014 were not up to the standards set by the earlier version of network coverage. Their biggest complaints were excessive commercials, bored announcers, abuse of production technology, and language that seemed to talk down to them. Many said that they had found alternate means of racing coverage, including NASCAR Hot Pass, radio broadcasts, the magazine NASCAR Illustrated and the NASCAR website. Some were even looking forward to the return of NASCAR on Fox, despite the gimmicks inherent to that portion of the racing season.

On October 4, 2008, SportsCenter reported that the Roush-Fenway Racing trio of Jimmie Johnson, Carl Edwards, and Greg Biffle were leading the championship standings. Johnson has always driven for Hendrick Motorsports during his Cup career, and never for Roush-Fenway Racing.

The many changes made in 2008, specifically the removal of on-air personalities with no previous NASCAR backgrounds and the reassignment of Wallace, may have come in response to these complaints.

NASCAR itself was disappointed at the production job done by ESPN at 2009 AMP Energy 500, the fall Talladega race. The morning of the race, in response to recent accidents at the track where cars went airborne (specifically, Carl Edwards flying into the catch fence after being turned in the tri-oval by Brad Keselowski on the last lap of the spring race), NASCAR instituted a rule banning bump drafting during the race. ESPN commentators frequently commented on how boring the race was because of the rule change, despite statistically (with 57 lead changes and 25 leaders) being comparable to past races at the track. The rule change itself proved ineffective at preventing car flips and accidents, as evidenced by Ryan Newman's blowover with five laps to go on the back straightaway, then Mark Martin's turnover in a crash in the tri-oval during the attempt at a green-white-checkered finish, and was quickly reversed before the 2010 season.

ESPN often did not recognize the title sponsors of events in its coverage unless their respective sponsors also pay a sponsorship fee to ESPN. Events without sponsorship deals with ESPN are presented by the network under generic titles with ESPN-furnished sponsors; for example, the Sunoco Red Cross Pennsylvania 500 was once branded as "NASCAR Sprint Cup Series at Pocono presented by Old Spice" by the network.

In NASCAR on ESPN's advertising campaign, their slogan was "Feel your heart race", a slogan which had already been trademarked by Kyle Petty's Victory Junction Gang. The latter's advertising also appeared on ESPN-carried races. This was changed to "Cause it's Racing" in 2010 and "Nothing Beats First Place" in 2011 and 2012.

During broadcasts since 2010, several improvements were made, including reduction in technology. There were also changes in announcing and pit reporters, most notably the moving Jerry Punch to pit road and IndyCar and occasional Nationwide Series lead announcer Marty Reid to lead broadcaster for the majority of NASCAR broadcasts beginning in 2010, including the Sprint Cup races. Sponsorship by non-NASCAR sponsors was also reduced. Allen Bestwick, formerly the lap-by-lap announcer for NBC's NASCAR coverage from 2001 to 2004, took over as lead broadcaster for Sprint Cup Series races in 2011.

Once the Chase for the Sprint Cup began and even in the races leading up to the Chase, ESPN often shifted its focus to the drivers in the Chase, in particular Jimmie Johnson. Often if a driver not in the Chase was leading and was passed for the lead by a Chase driver, he was not spoken of again for the rest of the broadcast. Case in point: in the November 2009 race in Texas, the vast majority of the broadcast was spent talking about Jimmie Johnson despite the fact he crashed on lap 3 and finished 38th. This was a fear of many once the Chase was introduced.

Finally, in 2010, ESPN with the consent of NASCAR, changed the networks that races were broadcast on. While the final eleven races of the season were broadcast on ABC from 2007–2009, all Sprint Cup races except for the three Saturday Night races in ESPN's portion of the schedule were switched to ESPN (the Bristol night race, previously on ESPN, was moved to ABC). This left only 3 races on over-the-air broadcasters for the last two-thirds of the NASCAR season. This, combined with the moving of the Brickyard 400, arguably NASCAR's second biggest race to ESPN, angered fans and sponsors.

=== Broadcast interruptions ===
Due to ESPN's various sports commitments, there were several interferences with NASCAR broadcasts. This was especially true once college football season started, when Nationwide Series races would often follow an early college football game. The broadcast start had also been delayed by the Little League World Series and ATP tennis. Many times (at least 15 as of 2010), NASCAR Countdown and even the start of the race were moved to ESPN Classic or, later, ESPNEWS. Due to contractual agreements with Turner, ESPN could not put broadcasts with ESPN3, another fact that angered fans. However, in 2011 an agreement was reached letting ESPN put all NASCAR programming on WatchESPN.

In 2010, because of the movement of the Chase races to ESPN and the earlier standardized 1:00 PM ET start times instituted by NASCAR, ESPN moved NASCAR Countdown to ESPN2 for all Chase races starting at 1:00 PM ET to avoid shortening or moving its Sunday NFL Countdown program. Viewers had to switch to the race at 1:00 PM ET from ESPN2 to ESPN. The next year, NASCAR moved the Chase races to later times (2:00 ET, then 3:00 ET for the final three races; Martinsville maintained a 1:30 PM ET starting time because, at the time, that track lacked lights and the grandstands cast long shadows over the racing surface in the late afternoon).

==== Network preemptions and relocations ====
- On September 30, 2007, the end of the LifeLock 400, part of that season's Chase, was moved from ABC to ESPN2 when a rain delay went past 6 p.m. ET, the end of the allotted broadcast window. This was in contrast to Fox and NBC coverage, which typically stayed on those stations even if the races ran long past the expected time.
- On March 15, 2008, the Sharpie Mini 300 moved from ABC to ESPN Classic at 6:15 p.m. so that ABC could show World News Saturday in the Eastern and Central time zones. The race was in a rain delay at the time and it was not resumed.
- On May 2, 2008, the Lipton Tea 250 was moved from ESPN2 to ESPN Classic due to ESPN2's commitment to cover game 6 of the Cleveland Cavaliers-Washington Wizards first-round NBA playoff series. Because ESPN Classic had a much more limited potential audience than ESPN or ESPN2, NASCAR asked Speed Channel to simulcast the race, and it agreed. ESPN2 then rebroadcast the race in its entirety after the basketball game. A similar arrangement was reached for the Kroger On Track for the Cure 250, scheduled for October 2008 at Memphis Motorsports Park, due to conflicts with college football and the Breeders' Cup.
- On November 9, 2008, the conclusion of the Checker O'Reilly Auto Parts 500 moved from ABC to ESPN2 because the race exceeded the allowable broadcast window due to two red-flag delays. ABC affiliates in the Eastern and Central time zones aired America's Funniest Home Videos instead, while those in the Mountain and Pacific time zones stayed with race coverage, with ESPN2 serving as a simulcast.
- On August 22, 2009, at the Sharpie 500 at Bristol Motor Speedway, both the invocation and the national anthem were preempted because the Little League World Series game ran long.
- On July 31, 2010, the first 23 laps of the Nationwide Series U.S. Cellular 250 at the Iowa Speedway, as well as all pre-race programming, were moved to ESPN Classic because of a semifinal match at the ATP Legg Mason Classic that ran long. This came shortly after the channel was upgraded to more expensive channel tiers on DirecTV and Dish Network, among other providers.
- The following day, on August 1, the final round of the Women's British Open ran a few minutes past 1 p.m. ET, meaning that the pre-race ceremonies of the Pennsylvania 500 were preempted. ESPN2, which picked up NASCAR Countdown from ESPN due to the conflict, had to start its coverage of the X Games at that time. However, the race itself was not affected.
- On October 2, 2010, NASCAR Countdown and the first several laps of the Kansas Lottery 300 were aired on ESPN Classic due to the Clemson-Miami football game running longer than anticipated.
- On October 31, 2010, due to technical difficulties, the last 45 minutes of the Sunday NFL Countdown and the first 57 laps of the 2010 AMP Energy Juice 500 were preempted on some providers.
- The 2011 Bubba Burger 250 scheduled for April 29 was moved from ESPN to Speed due to anticipated conflicts on both ESPN (with the second night of the 2011 NFL draft) and ESPN2 (one or more NBA playoff games). Unlike past conflicts, this broadcast was produced entirely by the Speed Channel combining their Truck Series broadcasting team and Fox Sports' Sprint Cup broadcasting teams. In 2012, the IZOD IndyCar Series Milwaukee IndyFest, which aired on ABC for the majority of the race, was moved to ESPNews for its final 114 laps due to the NASCAR Nationwide Series Alliance Truck Parts 250 being moved to ABC. In 2013 and 2014, when faced with a similar predicament, the Richmond spring Nationwide race was scheduled for ESPNEWS, but the 2014 race, whose start was delayed by rain, was moved to ESPN2 after the Toronto Raptors-Brooklyn Nets game ended.
- ESPNEWS was also used for the Nationwide Kentucky fall race due to its scheduling for a Saturday night during college football season.
- On September 20, 2014, NASCAR Countdown for the VisitMyrtleBeach.com 300 NASCAR Nationwide Series race at Kentucky Speedway was preempted by a college football game between Texas State and Illinois that was delayed by lightning.
- On October 11, 2014, the 2014 Bank of America 500 at Charlotte Motor Speedway, the final race to be broadcast on ABC, had its opening preempted by a late running college football game between TCU and Baylor. Coverage was moved to ESPNEWS (where it was also preempted because of a preseason NBA game between the Cleveland Cavaliers and the Miami Heat from Rio de Janeiro going into overtime), and was also stated to be on WatchESPN.com, which it wasn't. Fans voiced their anger on NASCAR's official live chat, and RaceBuddy was not provided on the website due to the race being on a broadcast network (RaceBuddy was later provided for all races starting in 2015, possibly in response to the controversy surrounding this race). The only way fans could get the start was by radio broadcast on PRN, or from the live lap-by-lap feed on the NASCAR App for smartphones. The first 25 laps were missed, and coverage was joined at a planned competition caution. A recap of the first 25 laps was almost immediately shown. NASCAR was also unhappy with the move and issued an apology. NASCAR later posted the full race (a practice that they had begun at Pocono's August race in 2014) on their official YouTube channel but with the world feed; the difference was all ESPN logos on graphics were removed. The race was further preempted on KATV in Little Rock, Arkansas when they went into local news instead, as did a few other ABC affiliates across the country.

==== Local station preemptions ====
- The Subway 500 from Martinsville Speedway was not shown on KABC-TV in Los Angeles (the second largest media market in the United States) on October 21 due to the California wildfires of October 2007, specifically the Buckweed fire in Santa Clarita and the Canyon fire in Malibu. Instead, the broadcast was shown on their 7.2 digital subchannel, which did not have universal availability.
- Several stations chose to preempt NASCAR Countdown for local news or to fulfill their weekly FCC-required educational and information programming requirements, either through the Saturday morning ABC Kids lineup or later, Litton's Weekend Adventure. KABC-TV did so before every Saturday night race in 2007 and 2008, and also did it before the 2007 Ford 400, a Sunday-afternoon event due to E/I requirements. This also occurred with WPLG in Miami, Florida and KSAT-TV in San Antonio, Texas at least once in 2007, and on November 1, 2009, the day of the 2009 AMP Energy 500, when KXLY-TV in Spokane, Washington preempted NASCAR Countdown to carry ABC Kids programming.
- Other stations preempted NASCAR Countdown for their own paid programming, as has been done by some ABC affiliates for NBA Countdown.
- At the other end of the scale, KTKA-TV in Topeka, Kansas left the 2007 Bank of America 500 on October 13 to launch its nightly late newscast at 10 p.m. Central time and did not return. Topeka is located about 60 miles from Emporia, Clint Bowyer's hometown. KSAT-TV also aired a brief news update, which came during a red flag, but returned in time for the checkered flag.
- The 2008 Sharpie Mini 300 was not seen on several ABC stations for various reasons, ranging from weather bulletins (WSB-TV in Atlanta and WSOC-TV in Charlotte) to the Big 12 basketball tournament (KLKN in Lincoln, Nebraska and WOI-DT in Des Moines, Iowa, among other stations in the conference's footprint). In addition, WABC-TV in New York City carried the race, but preempted NASCAR Countdown and the rain delay to cover breaking news involving a construction accident at a high-rise building in Manhattan.
- The pre-race for the 2008 Bank of America 500 was not seen on at least seven stations: KABC-TV, KSAT-TV, WPVI-TV in Philadelphia, WXYZ-TV in Detroit (of which Brad Keselowski's hometown of Rochester Hills is a suburb), WEWS-TV in Cleveland, WFTS-TV in the Tampa Bay area, and KXLY-TV. All of them aired newscasts, except for WXYZ-TV, which aired a charity fundraiser.
- The final eight laps of the 2008 Pep Boys Auto 500 were not shown on KOAT-TV, the ABC affiliate in Albuquerque, New Mexico. The station cut away at 4 p.m. Mountain time for a live pre-scheduled congressional debate for the state's 1st District seat. The ending was shifted to ESPN2, but only those receiving KOAT-TV on local cable (mostly Comcast) were able to see it; those who received the station via satellite continued to get the national feed of ESPN2.
- Multiple stations every August preempted the Irwin Tools Night Race for local coverage of NFL preseason football; in most cases the race then aired live on a station's digital subchannel or sister station, had a local substitution on a local cable channel or ESPN/ESPN2, or was not carried at all. Rarely, they were tape-delayed for overnight viewing. One market, West Michigan, is unique in having two ABC affiliates, and when WZZM preempted the 2012 race due to a Detroit Lions preseason game, WOTV broadcast the race live as to not tie up affiliate distribution complications to the market.
- In 2010, the Irwin Tools Night Race was preempted on WXYZ-TV for coverage of the Woodward Dream Cruise.
- In 2011, the Irwin Tools Night Race was preempted on most Mid-Atlantic and Northeast ABC affiliates for local news coverage of Hurricane Irene.
- During a rain delay in the 2012 Federated Auto Parts 400, WJLA-TV in Washington, DC cut out of the ESPN on ABC broadcast of the race to air the primetime local news and did not return to the race broadcast when the race resumed. After running the newscast, WJLA-TV went to a local commercial break and then rejoined the race broadcast at 11:46 p.m., several minutes after the race resumed.

==== Missing race endings ====
- On August 24, 2007, the final five laps of the Food City 250 NBS race at Bristol Motor Speedway were not televised by ESPN2 (but were shown on broadcasters outside of the United States, such as Canada's TSN). The reason was that a satellite uplink path was somehow eliminated, preventing the master control at the network headquarters (ironically in Bristol, Connecticut; the track is in Bristol, Tennessee) from re-transmitting the event to cable and satellite providers. Instead, viewers saw a blank screen, then the ESPN2 logo "screensaver", then some commercials. By the time the problem was rectified, the race was over, with Kasey Kahne as the winner. Jerry Punch, the lap-by-lap announcer, apologized for the error immediately and the final two laps were shown on a replay unedited. In addition, the first rebroadcast showed the same laps as they were intended to be broadcast with an on-screen ticker and GEICO sponsorship bug just after 4:30 a.m. ET the next morning. An ESPN spokesman blamed a "human error" of an unspecified nature.
- With nine laps remaining in the 2008 Federated Auto Parts 300, one or more feeds of ESPN2 on DirecTV suddenly cut off and was replaced by a static screen of the provider's logo, with audio from XM Satellite Radio's Top Tracks channel. By the time the picture returned, the race was over and Brad Keselowski celebrated his first win in the series, by then renamed Nationwide Series. The exact cause of the failure is unknown. Blogger John M. Daly blamed the problem on an error in the routing system in which the picture is sent to master control, and that neither ESPN2HD nor cable companies were affected. However, on a message board dealing with TV auto racing, moderator Cheryl Lauer reported that the opposite had happened to her, that HD was out while SD was broadcasting normally. She thought the problem was due to a complication in testing signals from a new satellite, D11.

==== Other problems/issues ====
- Due to college football commitments and an exceedingly long race which had 25 caution flags, coverage of the Busch Series' Sam's Town 250 on October 27, 2007 ended the moment David Reutimann took the checkered flag to win the race. There was no post-race interview with Reutimann, summary of the finishing order, or any other usual post-race programming. No interview aired on ESPNEWS or SportsCenter either, another decision that rankled some long-time fans.
- Coverage of the Nationwide Series' Jimmy John's Freaky Fast 300 at Chicagoland Speedway on September 13, 2014 ended the moment Kevin Harvick took the checkered flag due to the race exceeding its broadcast window and ESPN2 having a college football game between Alabama and Southern Mississippi, scheduled right after the race.
- Some drivers had testy relationships with ESPN reporters.
  - Tony Stewart was fined and docked 25 points after his win at the Allstate 400 in 2007 when he used an obscenity in his post-race interview. During it, he implied unfair treatment by the network in the past.
  - Also in 2007, Dale Earnhardt Jr. looked very uneasy in his interview with Mike Massaro at the Chevy Rock and Roll 400; Massaro ran a lengthy talk after Earnhardt Jr. dropped out with engine failure.
  - In 2009, Juan Pablo Montoya walked out on an interview with Vince Welch after the Pennsylvania 500 due to a line of questioning he was not happy with.
  - In 2010, during driver intros, Jamie Little kept giving Kevin Harvick questions while Harvick was visibly annoyed and replied with short answers and even following him onto the truck continuing the conversation.
  - In 2011, Kurt Busch, while getting ready to do an interview with Jerry Punch, kept telling him in a profanity-laced insult to hurry up. Punch canceled it but it was leaked on camera which led to the resigning of Kurt Busch at Penske Racing.
- Most of the races broadcast on ESPN on ABC had minimal or no post-race coverage. Several times, ESPN only interviewed the winner and second-place finisher. The most likely explanation is that the next program was, typically, ABC World News Sunday or a local newscast; the network wanted to start the newscast as soon as possible.
- At the 2007 Dickies 500 at Texas Motor Speedway, the majority of the coverage was focused on Jeff Gordon and Jimmie Johnson. There was only one mention when Juan Pablo Montoya led the opening laps of the race and ESPN on ABC did not air several of the lead changes or mention them on air. In addition, during the Busch Series O'Reilly Challenge race at Texas, the final laps were broadcast from an in-car camera of points championship leader Carl Edwards. ESPN did not air the finish of the race where Kevin Harvick won and instead stayed with an in-car shot of Edwards through the finish.
- At the 2007 UAW-Ford 500 at Talladega, ESPN on ABC did not air the final lead change as they were covering a battle a little deeper in the field. Jeff Gordon made the race winning move without mention of the lead change on ESPN on ABC until well after it had happened. Gordon won the race.
- At the 2010 Sunoco Red Cross Pennsylvania 500, Kurt Busch and Elliott Sadler crashed violently on lap 165. ESPN could get multiple angles of Busch's crash, but due to this being a blind spot on the track, ESPN only had one angle showing Sadler's crash (even then, partially out of frame), leaving many fans angry about not knowing how Sadler crashed and hit the inside wall.
- Shortly after the 2011 DRIVE4COPD 300, ESPN lost audio just as race winner Tony Stewart was about to answer a question. Due to those technical problems, ESPN began its special edition of SportsCenter from an infield studio at Daytona early. The interviews with Stewart and Dale Earnhardt Jr. were still recorded and played back 18 minutes later with the audio restored. However, the usual final tape montage and proper sign-off was not shown, at least not in the original live versions.
- At the 2011 Tums Fast Relief 500 at Martinsville, ESPN did not show the final lead change, because Brad Keselowski spun around while Tony Stewart made the race winning move around Jimmie Johnson. RaceBuddy viewers, though, were able to see it from Stewart and Johnson's onboards.
- At the 2013 NASCAR Nationwide Series event at Kentucky Speedway, Marty Reid made a human error and said that Ryan Blaney had won the race when the white flag was waving, even though Blaney continued on and won the race. The following Tuesday, Reid retired from the network; his future plans have not been discussed. Allen Bestwick called the rest of the 2013 and most of the 2014 NASCAR Nationwide Series events and also called ABC's IndyCar events starting in 2014.
- At the 2014 GEICO 500 at Talladega, the ESPN broadcast completely missed Tony Stewart spinning out in the tri-oval with two laps to go. The commentators didn't notice nor mentioned it after the race ended.

== Ultimate NASCAR ==
In addition to race coverage, ESPN aired a series of programs called Ultimate NASCAR. The series began in April 2007, when the network began to air a series of 100 one-minute vignettes highlighting NASCAR's most important moments as selected by a panel of experts. The vignettes aired every day until July 29. These moments are also recounted in a companion book published by the network.

In July 2007, ESPN aired a series of related documentaries. Three of them were countdown shows, ranking the greatest drivers, races, and rivalries in the sport's history. The other shows were "The Explosion" (a general overview), "The Dirt" (the origins of NASCAR), "The Cars" (the evolution of the NASCAR race car), "The Families" (an in-depth look at the Allison, Earnhardt and Petty families), and "Speed and Danger" (in which NASCAR drivers discuss the risks they take).

== Lineup variations ==
In order to reduce the workload of announcers during the first half of the season, ESPN constantly changed the lineup of those who covered the activities on the race track. In the 2007 season, ESPN used three different lap-by-lap announcers (Punch, Marty Reid, and Allen Bestwick), four different color commentators (Wallace, Petree, Jarrett, and Randy LaJoie), ten different pit reporters (Jack Arute, Bestwick, Dave Burns, Gary Gerould, Jamie Little, Mike Massaro, Marty Smith, Spake, Johnson, and Vince Welch), six infield studio hosts (Musburger, Bestwick, Massaro, Chris Fowler, Erik Kuselias, and Suzy Kolber), and at least four infield studio analysts (Daugherty, Brewer, Wallace, and Ray Evernham). Three times during the season, the network did not use an infield studio for NASCAR Countdown, during the split races (where Nextel Cup and Busch Series were in different venues during the same weekend). Also, none of the talent was at every race. In 2007, Daugherty had the longest streak, being at every race until the Meijer 300 at Kentucky Speedway on June 16.

The main booth remained the same for all Sprint Cup races.

In 2008, Jarrett was to be granted two months off from the end of April to the end of June to prepare for being the analyst for all 17 Sprint Cup races.

The exact team to be used at each race is listed in an ESPN press release on this page.

See below for a more detailed list of announcers and their roles.

== Announcers ==
=== Studio and pre-race shows ===
SpeedWeek 1983 – 1997
Host(s)	Tenure	Fill-In Host(s)	Tenure
Larry Nuber Bob Jenkins	1983 – 1989	Dave Despain	1992 – 1997
Bob Jenkins	1990–1997	Dave Despain	1992 – 1997

RPM 2Night/2Day 1995 – 2003
Hosts	Tenure	Analysts	Tenure	NASCAR Reporter(s)	Tenure
John Kernan	*Sunday – Friday, 1995 – 2003	Benny Parsons	1995 – 2000	Bill Weber	1995 – 2000
Kenny Mayne	Weekends, 1995 – August 1997	Jerry Punch	1995 – 2003	Matt Yocum	1999–2000
Rece Davis	Weekends, August 20, 1997 – 2000	Bill Weber	1995 – 2000	Mike Massaro	2001–2003
Whit Watson	Weekends, 2000 – August 2003				

- – John Kernan was the primary weekday host. On weekends that ESPN and ABC were covering Cup races, a weekend host would fill in on the Friday editions, as well as if there was a race postponed until Monday, through November 2000.

NASCAR 2Day 1995 – 2000
Hosts	Tenure	Analysts	Tenure	Reporters	Tenure
Dave Despain	1995 – 1998	Benny Parsons	1995 – 2000	Bill Weber	1995 – 1998
Bill Weber	1999 – 2000	Ned Jarrett	1995 – 2000	Ray Dunlap	1997 – 2000
Bill Weber	1999 – 2000	Ray Evernham	2000	Matt Yocum	1999 – 2000

Hosts	Years	Program
Bob Jenkins	1983–1997	SpeedWeek
Dave Despain	1995–1996	SpeedWeek
Dave Despain	1995–1996	NASCAR 2Day
Bill Weber	1997–2000	NASCAR 2Day
Brent Musburger	2007	NASCAR Countdown
Nicole Briscoe	2008–2014	NASCAR Countdown

Analysts	Years	Program
Larry Nuber	1983–1989	SpeedWeek
Benny Parsons	1995–2000	NASCAR 2Day
Brad Daugherty	2007–2014	NASCAR Countdown
Rusty Wallace	2007–2014	NASCAR Countdown
Ray Evernham	2008–2014	NASCAR Countdown

Reporters	Years	Program
Bill Weber	1995–1996	RPM 2Night
Ray Dunlap	1997–2000	RPM 2Night
Matt Yocum	1999–2000	RPM 2Night

=== Race Coverage ===
Lap-by-Lap	Winston	Cup	Busch	series	Craftsman Truck Series
Lap-by-Lap	Sprint	Cup	Busch	series	Craftsman Truck Series
Lap-by-Lap	Sprint	Cup	Nationwide	series	Craftsman Truck Series
Lap-by-Lap	Nextel	Cup	Nationwide	series	Craftsman Truck Series
Bob Jenkins	1981–2000		1981–1989, 1990–2000		1995–1998, 2002
Dave Despain	1981		1998		1995–1998
Mike Joy	1981				
Larry Nuber	1984–1987		1985–1987		
Jack Arute	1986				
Ray Dunlap			1999		1997
Jerry Punch	1990, 1995, 1999-2000, 2007–2009		1990–2000, 2007–2009		2001–2002
Marty Reid	2010		1999–2000, 2007–2013		1998–2000
Allen Bestwick	2011–2014		2007–2014		
Vince Welch			2010		
Dave Burns			2014		

Color Commentator	Winston	Cup	Busch	series	Craftsman Truck Series
Color Commentator	Sprint	Cup	Busch	series	Craftsman Truck Series
Color Commentator	Sprint	Cup	Nationwide	series	Craftsman Truck Series
Color Commentator	Nextel	Cup	Nationwide	series	Craftsman Truck Series
Eli Gold	1981				
Larry Nuber	1981–1987		1981–1987		
Dick Berggren	1981, 1987				
Ned Jarrett*	1982, 1988–2000, 2007		1988–1997, 1999–2000, 2007		1995, 2000
Benny Parsons	1983–1986, 1989–2000		1989, 1991–2000		1995–2000
Jack Arute	1984–1986				
Rick Mears	1986				
Jerry Punch	1986–1987				
Chris Economaki	1987				
Gary Nelson	1988–1989				
Dorsey Schroeder	1994–1995				1998
Brett Bodine			1994		
Kyle Petty			1995–2000		1996
Elton Sawyer					1995
Bill Elliott	1996				
Larry Rice					1997, 2000
Phil Parsons					1997–1998, 2001–2002
Steve Park			1998		
Chad Little			1998		
Jeremy Dale			1999–2000		1999–2000
Ray Evernham			2008–2010		2000
Mike Skinner					2002
Andy Petree	2007–2014		2007–2014		
Dale Jarrett	2008–2014		2007–2014		
Randy LaJoie			2007–2010		
Ricky Craven			2010–2014		
Rusty Wallace	2007		2007–2014		

NOTE: Ned Jarrett only appeared on races broadcast by the ESPN family of networks during his time there. He had a separate contract with CBS Sports and was thus precluded from working races televised on ABC.

Pit Reporters	Winston	Cup	Busch	Series	Craftsman Truck Series
Pit Reporters	Sprint	Cup	Busch	Series	Craftsman Truck Series
Pit Reporters	Sprint	Cup	Nationwide	Series	Craftsman Truck Series
Pit Reporters	Nextel	Cup	Nationwide	Series	Craftsman Truck Series
Ned Jarrett	1981–1982				
Leandra Reilly	1982				
Ron Kendrick	1982				
Dick Berggren	1982–1990		1982–1990		
Jerry Punch	1986–2000, 2010–2014		1988–1989, 1990–2000, 2010–2014		1997
Jack Arute	1984–1989, 1990–2000		2007–2009		
Larry Nuber	1985, 1988		1988		
Gary Lee	1987		1994		
Marty Reid	1987, 1994		1997–1998		1995–1998
Benny Parsons	1988–1989		1990–1993		
John Kernan	1990–2000		1990–2000		
Rick DeBruhl	1990		2007–2014		1996, 1998
Dave Despain			1991–1992, 1996–1997		
Bill Weber	1994–2000		1995–2000		1997–1998
Kyle Petty			1994–1997		
Michael Waltrip			1994–1995		
Gary Gerould	1994–1996		2007		1998–1999
Ray Dunlap	1997–2000		1997–2000		1999–2002
Larry Rice					1997
Matt Yocum			1999–2000		
Amy East					1999–2002
Dave Burns	2007–2014		1999–2000, 2007–2014		1999–2000
Allen Bestwick	2007		2007		
Jamie Little	2007–2014		2007–2014		
Vince Welch	2009–2014		2009–2014		
Mike Massaro	2007–2014		2007–2014		
Shannon Spake	2007–2013		2007–2013		
Marty Smith			2007		
Jim Noble			2009–2014		

=== Cup ===
==== 1961-2000 (ABC) ====
Year	Date	Event	Track	Network	Coverage	Commentary		Pit Reporters
Year	Date	Event	Track	Network	Coverage	Lap-by-lap	Color	Pit Reporters
1976	February 12	Twin 125's	Daytona	ABC	Highlights	Bill Flemming	Chris Economaki	
1976	February 15	Daytona 500	Daytona	ABC	Live	Bill Flemming	Jackie Stewart	Chris Economaki
1976	March 21	Atlanta 500	Atlanta	ABC	Live	Bill Flemming	Jackie Stewart	Chris Economaki
1976	April 11	Rebel 500	Darlington	ABC	Highlights			
1976	July 4	Firecracker 400	Daytona	ABC	Highlights	Bill Flemming	Sam Posey	Chris Economaki
1976	September 5	Southern 500	Darlington	ABC	Highlights	Bill Flemming	Jackie Stewart	
1976	October 10	National 500	Charlotte	ABC	Highlights	Keith Jackson	Chris Economaki	
1976	November 21	Los Angeles Times 500	Ontario	ABC	Highlights	Jim McKay	Chris Economaki	
1977	February 17	Twin 125's	Daytona	ABC	Highlights	Jim McKay	Jackie Stewart	Chris Economaki
1977	February 20	Daytona 500	Daytona	ABC	Live	Jim McKay	Jackie Stewart	Chris Economaki
1977	March 20	Atlanta 500	Atlanta	ABC	Live	Keith Jackson	Jackie Stewart	Chris Economaki
1977	April 3	Rebel 500	Darlington	ABC	Live	Keith Jackson	Jackie Stewart	Chris Economaki
1977	July 4	Firecracker 400	Daytona	ABC	Highlights	Bill Flemming	Chris Economaki	
1977	September 5	Southern 500	Darlington	ABC	Highlights	Bill Flemming	Jackie Stewart	
1977	October 8	National 500	Charlotte	ABC	Highlights	Al Michaels	Chris Economaki	
1978	February 16	Twin 125's	Daytona	ABC	Highlights	Jim McKay	Jackie Stewart	Chris Economaki
1978	February 19	Daytona 500	Daytona	ABC	Live	Jim McKay	Jackie Stewart	Chris Economaki
1978	March 19	Atlanta 500	Atlanta	ABC	Live	Al Michaels	Jackie Stewart	Chris Economaki
1978	April 9	Rebel 500	Darlington	ABC	Live	Jim McKay	Jackie Stewart	Chris Economaki
1978	June 18	Gabriel 400	Michigan	ABC	Highlights	Al Michaels	Jackie Stewart	Chris Economaki
1978	July 4	Firecracker 400	Daytona	ABC	Highlights	Jim McKay	Chris Economaki	
1978	September 4	Southern 500	Darlington	ABC	Highlights	Keith Jackson	Chris Economaki	
1978	October 8	National 500	Charlotte	ABC	Highlights	Jim McKay	Jackie Stewart	Chris Economaki
1979	March 18	Atlanta 500	Atlanta	ABC	Highlights	Al Michaels	Jackie Stewart	Chris Economaki
1979	April 8	Rebel 500	Darlington	ABC	Live	Jim McKay	Jackie Stewart	Chris Economaki
1979	June 17	Gabriel 400	Michigan	ABC	Highlights	Al Michaels	Jackie Stewart	Chris Economaki
1979	July 4	Firecracker 400	Daytona	ABC	Highlights	Keith Jackson	Sam Posey	Chris Economaki
1979	September 3	Southern 500	Darlington	ABC	Highlights	Bill Flemming	Jackie Stewart	
1980	March 16	Atlanta 500	Atlanta	ABC	Highlights	Al Michaels	Jackie Stewart	Chris Economaki
1980	April 13	CRC Chemicals Rebel 500	Darlington	ABC	Live	Keith Jackson	Jackie Stewart	Chris Economaki
1980	July 4	Firecracker 400	Daytona	ABC	Highlights	Jim McKay	Sam Posey	Chris Economaki
1980	July 27	Coca-Cola 500	Pocono	ABC	Highlights	Chris Economaki	Jackie Stewart	
1980	September 6	Southern 500	Darlington	ABC	Highlights	Jim Lampley	Sam Posey	Chris Economaki
1981	March 15	Coca-Cola 500	Atlanta	ABC	Live	Jim McKay	Jackie Stewart	Chris Economaki
1981	April 12	CRC Chemicals Rebel 500	Darlington	ABC	Highlights	Al Michaels	Jackie Stewart	Chris Economaki
1981	July 4	Firecracker 400	Daytona	ABC	Highlights	Keith Jackson	Jackie Stewart	Chris Economaki
1981	September 7	Southern 500	Darlington	ABC	Highlights	Bill Flemming	Jackie Stewart	Chris Economaki
1982	March 21	Coca-Cola 500	Atlanta	ABC	Highlights	Al Michaels	Sam Posey	Chris Economaki
1982	April 10	CRC Chemicals Rebel 500	Darlington	ABC	Live	Al Michaels	Jackie Stewart	Chris Economaki; Sam Posey
1982	July 4	Firecracker 400	Daytona	ABC	Highlights	Keith Jackson	Jackie Stewart	Chris Economaki; Sam Posey
1982	September 6	Southern 500	Darlington	ABC	Highlights	Bill Flemming	Jackie Stewart	Chris Economaki
1983	March 27	Coca-Cola 500	Atlanta	ABC	Live	Al Michaels	Sam Posey	Chris Economaki
1983	April 10	TranSouth 500	Darlington	ABC	Live	Bill Flemming	Sam Posey	Chris Economaki
1983	July 4	Firecracker 400	Daytona	ABC	Highlights	Bill Flemming	Sam Posey	Chris Economaki
1984	March 18	Coca-Cola 500	Atlanta	ABC	Highlights	Jim McKay	Sam Posey	Danny Sullivan
1984	July 4	Firecracker 400	Daytona	ABC	Highlights	Jim Lampley	Sam Posey	Larry Nuber
1985	March 17	Coca-Cola 500	Atlanta	ABC	Highlights	Jim McKay	Sam Posey	Larry Nuber
1985	July 4	Firecracker 400	Daytona	ABC	Highlights	Al Trautwig	Sam Posey	
1986	March 16	Motorcraft 500	Atlanta	ABC	Live	Jim Lampley	Sam Posey	Tim Brant; Al Trautwig
1986	July 4	Firecracker 400	Daytona	ABC	Highlights	Al Trautwig	Sam Posey	Jerry Punch
1987	March 15	Motorcraft 500	Atlanta	ABC	Live	Jim Lampley	Sam Posey	Jerry Punch; Jerry Gappens
1987	May 17	The Winston	Charlotte	ABC	Live	Keith Jackson	Donnie Allison	Jerry Punch
1987	July 4	Pepsi Firecracker 400	Daytona	ABC	Highlights	Keith Jackson	Donnie Allison	Jerry Punch; Jerry Gappens
1988	March 20	Motorcraft 500	Atlanta	ABC	Live	Keith Jackson	Jerry Punch	Jack Arute; Jerry Gappens
1988	May 22	The Winston	Charlotte	ABC	Live	Keith Jackson	Jerry Punch	Jerry Gappens; Benny Parsons
1988	July 2	Pepsi Firecracker 400	Daytona	ABC	Highlights	Paul Page	Johnny Rutherford	Jerry Punch; Jack Arute
1989	March 19	Motorcraft 500	Atlanta	ABC	Live	Paul Page	Sam Posey; Bobby Unser	Jerry Punch; Jack Arute
1989	May 20	The Winston	Charlotte	ABC	Live	Paul Page	Bobby Unser; Benny Parsons	Jerry Punch; Jack Arute
1990	March 18	Motorcraft 500	Atlanta	ABC	Live	Paul Page	Bobby Unser; Benny Parsons	Jerry Punch; Gary Gerould
1990	May 20	The Winston	Charlotte	ABC	Live	Paul Page	Bobby Unser; Benny Parsons	Jack Arute; Gary Gerould
1991	March 17–18	Motorcraft 500	Atlanta	ABC	Live (Note: The 1991 Motorcraft Quality Parts 500 was rained out after 51 laps on Sunday and ran the next day. ABC couldn't televise the remainder of the race due to its daytime programming.)	Paul Page	Bobby Unser; Benny Parsons	Jerry Punch; Gary Gerould
1992	March 15	Motorcraft 500	Atlanta	ABC	Live	Paul Page	Bobby Unser; Benny Parsons	Jack Arute; Gary Gerould
~~1993~~	~~March 14~~	~~Motorcraft Quality Parts 500~~	~~Atlanta~~	~~ABC~~ (Note: The 1993 Motorcraft Quality Parts 500 was scheduled to be on ABC on March 14th but the 1993 Storm of the Century occurred in Atlanta postponing the race. The race was rescheduled for March 20th and ABC pulled out and TNN took over.)	~~Live~~	~~N/A~~	~~N/A~~	~~N/A~~
1994	March 13	Purolator 500	Atlanta	ABC	Live	Bob Jenkins	Benny Parsons	Jerry Punch; Jack Arute; John Kernan
1994	August 6	Brickyard 400	Indianapolis	ABC	Live	Bob Jenkins	Benny Parsons	Jerry Punch; Jack Arute; Gary Gerould
1995	March 12	Purolator 500	Atlanta	ABC	Live	Bob Jenkins	Benny Parsons	Jerry Punch; Jack Arute; John Kernan
1995	~~August 5~~	~~Brickyard 400~~	~~Indianapolis~~	~~ABC~~	~~Live~~ (Note: The 1995 Brickyard 400 was scheduled to be on ABC but a rain delay that went beyond ABC's broadcast window meant it had to be moved to ESPN which aired the race on tape delay the following day.)	~~Bob Jenkins~~	~~Benny Parsons~~	~~Jerry Punch~~; ~~Jack Arute~~; ~~Gary Gerould~~
1996	March 10	Purolator 500	Atlanta	ABC	Live	Bob Jenkins	Benny Parsons	Jerry Punch; Bill Weber; Jack Arute
1996	August 3	Brickyard 400	Indianapolis	ABC	Live	Bob Jenkins	Benny Parsons; Danny Sullivan	Jerry Punch; Jack Arute; Gary Gerould
1997	March 9	Primestar 500	Atlanta	ABC	Live	Bob Jenkins	Benny Parsons	Jerry Punch; Bill Weber; Jack Arute
1997	June 22	California 500	California	ABC	Live	Bob Jenkins	Benny Parsons	Jerry Punch; Bill Weber; Jack Arute
1997	August 3	Brickyard 400	Indianapolis	ABC	Live	Bob Jenkins	Benny Parsons	Jerry Punch; Bill Weber; Jack Arute
1998	March 1	Las Vegas 400	Las Vegas	ABC	Live	Bob Jenkins	Benny Parsons	Jerry Punch; Bill Weber; Jack Arute
1998	~~March 8~~	~~Primestar 500~~	~~Atlanta~~	~~ABC~~	~~Live~~ (Note: The 1998 Primestar 500 was scheduled to be on ABC but a rain delay to Monday meant it had to be moved to ESPN which aired the race the following day.)	~~Bob Jenkins~~	~~Benny Parsons~~	~~Jerry Punch~~; ~~Bill Weber~~; ~~Jack Arute~~
1998	April 26	DieHard 500	Talladega	ABC	Live	Bob Jenkins	Benny Parsons	Jerry Punch; Bill Weber; Jack Arute
1998	August 1	Brickyard 400	Indianapolis	ABC	Live	Bob Jenkins	Benny Parsons	Jerry Punch; Bill Weber; Jack Arute
1999	March 7	Las Vegas 400	Las Vegas	ABC	Live	Bob Jenkins	Benny Parsons	Jerry Punch; Bill Weber; John Kernan
1999	March 14	Cracker Barrel 500	Atlanta	ABC	Live	Bob Jenkins	Benny Parsons	Jerry Punch; Bill Weber; John Kernan
1999	April 25	DieHard 500	Talladega	ABC	Live	Bob Jenkins	Benny Parsons	Jerry Punch; Bill Weber; John Kernan
1999	May 2	California 500	California	ABC	Live	Bob Jenkins	Benny Parsons	Jerry Punch; Bill Weber; John Kernan
1999	August 9	Brickyard 400	Indianapolis	ABC	Live	Bob Jenkins	Benny Parsons	Jerry Punch; Bill Weber; Ray Dunlap
2000	March 5	CarsDirect.com 400	Las Vegas	ABC	Live	Bob Jenkins	Benny Parsons; Ray Evernham	Jerry Punch; Bill Weber; John Kernan
2000	March 12	Cracker Barrel 500	Atlanta	ABC	Live	Bob Jenkins	Benny Parsons; Ray Evernham	Jerry Punch; Bill Weber; John Kernan
2000	April 16	DieHard 500	Talladega	ABC	Live	Bob Jenkins	Benny Parsons; Ray Evernham	Jerry Punch; Bill Weber; John Kernan
2000	April 30	NAPA Auto Parts 500	California	ABC	Live	Bob Jenkins	Benny Parsons; Ray Evernham	Jerry Punch; Bill Weber; John Kernan
2000	August 5	Brickyard 400	Indianapolis	ABC	Live	Bob Jenkins	Benny Parsons; Ray Evernham	Jerry Punch; Bill Weber; Ray Dunlap

==== 1981-2000 (ESPN) ====
Year	Date	Event	Track	Network	Coverage	Commentary		Pit Reporters
Year	Date	Event	Track	Network	Coverage	Lap-by-lap	Color	Pit Reporters
1981	March 1	Carolina 500	Rockingham	ESPN	Delayed	Bob Jenkins	Eli Gold	Ned Jarrett
1981	April 26	Virginia 500	Martinsville	ESPN	Delayed	Bob Jenkins	Eli Gold	Ned Jarrett
1981	May 3	Winston 500	Talladega	ESPN	Delayed	Dave Despain	Larry Nuber	Ned Jarrett
1981	May 17	Mason-Dixon 500	Dover	ESPN	Delayed	Bob Jenkins	Dick Berggren	Ned Jarrett
1981	November 8	Atlanta Journal 500	Atlanta	ESPN	Live	Mike Joy	Larry Nuber	Ned Jarrett
1982	February 21	Richmond 400	Richmond	ESPN	Live	Bob Jenkins	Larry Nuber	Leandra Reilly
1982	April 18	Northwestern Bank 400	North Wilkesboro	ESPN	Live	Bob Jenkins	Ned Jarrett	Ron Kendrick
1982	May 3	Winston 500	Talladega	ESPN	Live	Bob Jenkins	Larry Nuber	Dick Berggren
1982	August 22	Champion Spark Plug 400	Michigan	ESPN	Live	Bob Jenkins	Larry Nuber	Dick Berggren
1982	September 12	Wrangler Sanfor-Set 400	Richmond	ESPN	Live	Bob Jenkins	Larry Nuber	Dick Berggren
1982	October 3	Holly Farms 400	North Wilkesboro	ESPN	Live	Bob Jenkins	Larry Nuber	Ned Jarrett
1982	~~October 24~~	~~American 500~~	~~Rockingham~~	~~ESPN~~	~~Live~~ (Note: The 1982 American 500 was scheduled to be on ESPN but the race was rained out and rescheduled for the next week. ESPN opted not to show the rescheduled race.)	~~Bob Jenkins~~	~~Larry Nuber~~	~~Dick Berggren~~
1982	November 7	Atlanta Journal 500	Atlanta	ESPN	Live	Bob Jenkins	Larry Nuber	Ned Jarrett; Dick Berggren
1983	March 6 March 13	Carolina 500	Rockingham	ESPN	Live (Note: The 1983 Carolina 500 was started on March 6th but finished on March 13th due to rain.)	Bob Jenkins	Larry Nuber	Dick Berggren
1983	April 17	Northwestern Bank 400	North Wilkesboro	ESPN	Live	Bob Jenkins	Larry Nuber	Dick Berggren
1983	June 5	Budweiser 400	Riverside	ESPN	Delayed	Bill Hennesey	Loren St. Lawrence	Pat Patterson
1983	August 21	Champion Spark Plug 400	Michigan	ESPN	Live	Bob Jenkins	Larry Nuber	Dick Berggren
1983	September 11	Wrangler Sanfor-Set 400	Richmond	ESPN	Live	Bob Jenkins	Larry Nuber	Dick Berggren
1983	October 2	Holly Farms 400	North Wilkesboro	ESPN	Live	Bob Jenkins	Larry Nuber	Dick Berggren
1983	~~October 23~~; October 30	American 500	Rockingham	ESPN	Live (Note: The 1983 American 500 was scheduled to be on October 23rd but rescheduled on October 30th due to a rain delay.)	Bob Jenkins	Benny Parsons	Larry Nuber
1989	May 7	Winston 500	Talladega	ESPN	Live	Bob Jenkins	Ned Jarrett; Benny Parsons	Jerry Punch; Jack Arute
1989	July 1	Pepsi 400	Daytona	ESPN	Delayed	Bob Jenkins	Ned Jarrett; Benny Parsons	Jerry Punch; Jack Arute
1989	November 19	Atlanta Journal 500	Atlanta	ESPN	Live	Bob Jenkins	Ned Jarrett; Benny Parsons	Jerry Punch; Dick Berggren
1990	March 4	Carolina 500	Rockingham	ESPN	Live	Bob Jenkins	Ned Jarrett; Benny Parsons	Jerry Punch; Dick Berggren
1990	April 1	TranSouth 400	Darlington	ESPN	Live	Bob Jenkins	Ned Jarrett; Benny Parsons	Jerry Punch; Dick Berggren
1990	April 8	Valleydale Meats 500	Bristol	ESPN	Live	Bob Jenkins	Ned Jarrett; Benny Parsons	Jerry Punch; John Kernan
1990	April 22	First Union 400	North Wilkesboro	ESPN	Live	Bob Jenkins	Ned Jarrett; Benny Parsons	Jerry Punch; John Kernan
1990	April 29	Hanes Activewear 500	Martinsville	ESPN	Live	Bob Jenkins	Ned Jarrett; Benny Parsons	Jerry Punch; John Kernan
1990	May 6	Winston 500	Talladega	ESPN	Live	Bob Jenkins	Ned Jarrett; Benny Parsons	Jerry Punch; John Kernan
1990	July 7	Pepsi 400	Daytona	ESPN	Live	Bob Jenkins	Ned Jarrett; Benny Parsons	Jerry Punch; John Kernan
1990	August 12	The Bud at The Glen	Watkins Glen	ESPN	Live	Bob Jenkins	Ned Jarrett; Benny Parsons	Jerry Punch; John Kernan
1990	August 19	Champion Spark Plug 400	Michigan	ESPN	Live	Bob Jenkins	Ned Jarrett; Benny Parsons	Jerry Punch; John Kernan
1990	October 21	AC Delco 500	Rockingham	ESPN	Live	Bob Jenkins	Ned Jarrett; Benny Parsons	Jerry Punch; John Kernan
1990	November 4	Checker 500	Phoenix	ESPN	Live	Jerry Punch	Ned Jarrett; Benny Parsons	John Kernan; Rick DeBruhl
1990	November 18	Atlanta Journal 500	Atlanta	ESPN	Live	Bob Jenkins	Ned Jarrett; Benny Parsons	Jerry Punch; John Kernan
1991	April 7	TranSouth 400	Darlington	ESPN	Live	Bob Jenkins	Ned Jarrett; Benny Parsons	Jerry Punch; John Kernan
1991	April 14	Valleydale Meats 500	Bristol	ESPN	Live/Delayed (Note: The 1991 Valleydale Meats 500 had ESPN move the finish to tape delay due to a rain delay that lasted 1 hour and 12 minutes.)	Bob Jenkins	Ned Jarrett; Benny Parsons	Jerry Punch; John Kernan
1991	April 21	First Union 400	North Wilkesboro	ESPN	Live	Bob Jenkins	Ned Jarrett; Benny Parsons	Jerry Punch; John Kernan
1991	April 28	Hanes Activewear 500	Martinsville	ESPN	Live	Bob Jenkins	Ned Jarrett; Benny Parsons	Jerry Punch; John Kernan
1991	~~May 5~~; May 6	Winston 500	Talladega	ESPN	Live (Note: The 1991 Winston 500 was scheduled to be on May 5th but rescheduled on May 6th due to a rain delay.)	Bob Jenkins	Ned Jarrett; Benny Parsons	Jerry Punch; John Kernan
1991	June 9	Banquet Frozen Foods 300	Sonoma	ESPN	Live	Bob Jenkins	Ned Jarrett; Benny Parsons	Jerry Punch; John Kernan
1991	June 16	Champion Spark Plug 500	Pocono	ESPN	Live	Bob Jenkins	Ned Jarrett	Jerry Punch; John Kernan
1991	July 6	Pepsi 400	Daytona	ESPN	Live	Bob Jenkins	Ned Jarrett; Benny Parsons	Jerry Punch; John Kernan
1991	July 21	Miller Genuine Draft 500	Pocono	ESPN	Live	Bob Jenkins	Ned Jarrett; Benny Parsons	Jerry Punch; John Kernan
1991	August 11	Budweiswer at the Glen	Watkins Glen	ESPN	Live	Bob Jenkins	Ned Jarrett; Benny Parsons	Jerry Punch; John Kernan
1991	August 18	Champion Spark Plug 400	Michigan	ESPN	Live	Bob Jenkins	Ned Jarrett; Benny Parsons	Jerry Punch; John Kernan
1991	August 24	Bud 500	Bristol	ESPN	Live	Bob Jenkins	Ned Jarrett; Benny Parsons	Jerry Punch; John Kernan
1991	September 1	Heinz Southern 500	Darlington	ESPN	Live	Bob Jenkins	Ned Jarrett; Benny Parsons	Jerry Punch; John Kernan
1991	September 22	Goody's 500	Martinsville	ESPN	Live	Bob Jenkins	Ned Jarrett; Benny Parsons	Jerry Punch; John Kernan
1991	September 29	Tyson Holly Farms 400	North Wilkesboro	ESPN	Live	Bob Jenkins	Ned Jarrett; Benny Parsons	Jerry Punch; John Kernan
1991	November 17	Hardee's 500	Atlanta	ESPN	Live	Bob Jenkins	Ned Jarrett; Benny Parsons	Jerry Punch; John Kernan
1992	March 29	TranSouth 400	Darlington	ESPN	Live	Bob Jenkins	Ned Jarrett; Benny Parsons	Jerry Punch; John Kernan
1992	April 5	Food City 500	Bristol	ESPN	Live	Bob Jenkins	Ned Jarrett; Benny Parsons	Jerry Punch; John Kernan
1992	April 12	First Union 400	North Wilkesboro	ESPN	Live	Bob Jenkins	Ned Jarrett; Benny Parsons	Jerry Punch; John Kernan
1992	April 26	Hanes 500	Martinsville	ESPN	Delayed (Note: The 1992 Hanes 500 was held at the same time as the 1992 NFL draft. ESPN chose to cover the NFL Draft live and forcing ESPN to air the race on tape the next day.)	Bob Jenkins	Ned Jarrett; Benny Parsons	Jerry Punch; John Kernan
1992	May 3	Winston 500	Talladega	ESPN	Live	Bob Jenkins	Ned Jarrett; Benny Parsons	Jerry Punch; John Kernan
1992	June 7	Save Mart 300K	Sonoma	ESPN	Live	Bob Jenkins	Ned Jarrett; Benny Parsons	Jerry Punch; John Kernan
1992	June 14	Champion Spark Plug 500	Pocono	ESPN	Live	Bob Jenkins	Ned Jarrett; Benny Parsons	Jerry Punch; John Kernan
1992	July 4	Pepsi 400	Daytona	ESPN	Live	Bob Jenkins	Ned Jarrett; Benny Parsons	Jerry Punch; John Kernan
1992	July 19	Miller Genuine Draft 500	Pocono	ESPN	Live	Bob Jenkins	Ned Jarrett; Benny Parsons	Jerry Punch; John Kernan
1992	August 9	The Bud at The Glen	Watkins Glen	ESPN	Live	Bob Jenkins	Ned Jarrett; Benny Parsons	Jerry Punch; John Kernan
1992	August 16	Champion Spark Plug 400	Michigan	ESPN	Live	Bob Jenkins	Ned Jarrett; Benny Parsons	Jerry Punch; John Kernan
1992	August 29	Bud 500	Bristol	ESPN	Live	Bob Jenkins	Ned Jarrett; Benny Parsons	Jerry Punch; John Kernan
1992	September 6	Mountain Dew Southern 500	Darlington	ESPN	Live	Bob Jenkins	Ned Jarrett; Benny Parsons	Jerry Punch; John Kernan
1992	~~September 27~~; September 28	Goody's 500	Martinsville	ESPN	Live (Note: The 1992 Goody's 500 was scheduled to be on September 27th but rescheduled on September 28th due to a rain delay.)	Bob Jenkins	Ned Jarrett; Benny Parsons	Jerry Punch; John Kernan
1992	~~October 4~~; October 5	Tyson Holly Farms 400	North Wilkesboro	ESPN	Live (Note: The 1992 Tyson Holly Farms 400 was scheduled to be on October 4th but rescheduled on October 5th due to a rain delay.)	Bob Jenkins	Ned Jarrett; Benny Parsons	Jerry Punch; John Kernan
1992	November 15	Hooters 500	Atlanta	ESPN	Live	Bob Jenkins	Ned Jarrett; Benny Parsons	Jerry Punch; John Kernan
1993	March 28	TranSouth 400	Darlington	ESPN	Live	Bob Jenkins	Ned Jarrett; Benny Parsons	Jerry Punch; John Kernan
1993	April 4	Food City 500	Bristol	ESPN	Live	Bob Jenkins	Ned Jarrett; Benny Parsons	Jerry Punch; John Kernan
1993	April 18	First Union 400	North Wilkesboro	ESPN	Live	Bob Jenkins	Ned Jarrett; Benny Parsons	Jerry Punch; John Kernan
1993	April 25	Hanes 500	Martinsville	ESPN	Live	Bob Jenkins	Ned Jarrett; Benny Parsons	Jerry Punch; John Kernan
1993	May 2	Winston 500	Talladega	ESPN	Live	Bob Jenkins	Ned Jarrett; Benny Parsons	Jerry Punch; John Kernan
1993	May 16	Save Mart Supermarkets 300	Sonoma	ESPN	Live	Bob Jenkins	Ned Jarrett; Benny Parsons	Jerry Punch; John Kernan
1993	June 13	Champion Spark Plug 500	Pocono	ESPN	Live	Bob Jenkins	Ned Jarrett; Benny Parsons	Jerry Punch; John Kernan
1993	July 3	Pepsi 400	Daytona	ESPN	Live	Bob Jenkins	Ned Jarrett; Benny Parsons	Jerry Punch; John Kernan
1993	August 8	The Bud at The Glen	Watkins Glen	ESPN	Live	Bob Jenkins	Ned Jarrett; Benny Parsons	Jerry Punch; John Kernan
1993	August 15	Champion Spark Plug 400	Michigan	ESPN	Live	Bob Jenkins	Ned Jarrett; Benny Parsons	Jerry Punch; John Kernan
1993	August 28	Bud 500	Bristol	ESPN	Live	Bob Jenkins	Ned Jarrett; Benny Parsons	Jerry Punch; John Kernan
1993	September 5	Mountain Dew Southern 500	Darlington	ESPN	Live	Bob Jenkins	Ned Jarrett; Benny Parsons	Jerry Punch; John Kernan
1993	September 26	Goody's 500	Martinsville	ESPN	Live	Bob Jenkins	Ned Jarrett; Benny Parsons	Jerry Punch; John Kernan
1993	October 3	Tyson Holly Farms 400	North Wilkesboro	ESPN	Live	Bob Jenkins	Ned Jarrett; Benny Parsons	Jerry Punch; John Kernan
1993	November 14	Hooters 500	Atlanta	ESPN	Live	Bob Jenkins	Ned Jarrett; Benny Parsons	Jerry Punch; John Kernan
1994	March 27	TranSouth Financial 400	Darlington	ESPN	Live	Bob Jenkins	Ned Jarrett; Benny Parsons	Jerry Punch; John Kernan
1994	April 10	Food City 500	Bristol	ESPN	Live	Bob Jenkins	Ned Jarrett; Benny Parsons	Jerry Punch; John Kernan
1994	April 17	First Union 400	North Wilkesboro	ESPN	Live	Bob Jenkins	Ned Jarrett; Benny Parsons	Jerry Punch; John Kernan
1994	April 24	Hanes 500	Martinsville	ESPN	Live	Bob Jenkins	Ned Jarrett; Benny Parsons	Jerry Punch; John Kernan
1994	May 1	Winston Select 500	Talladega	ESPN	Live	Bob Jenkins	Ned Jarrett; Benny Parsons	Jerry Punch; John Kernan
1994	May 15	Save Mart Supermarkets 300	Sonoma	ESPN	Live	Bob Jenkins	Ned Jarrett; Benny Parsons	Jerry Punch; John Kernan
1994	July 2	Pepsi 400	Daytona	ESPN	Live	Bob Jenkins	Ned Jarrett; Benny Parsons	Jerry Punch; John Kernan
1994	August 14	The Bud at The Glen	Watkins Glen	ESPN	Live	Bob Jenkins	Ned Jarrett; Benny Parsons; Dorsey Schroeder	Jerry Punch; John Kernan
1994	August 21	GM Goodwrench 400	Michigan	ESPN	Live	Bob Jenkins	Ned Jarrett; Benny Parsons	Jerry Punch; John Kernan
1994	August 27	Goody's 500	Bristol	ESPN	Live	Bob Jenkins	Ned Jarrett; Benny Parsons	Jerry Punch; John Kernan
1994	September 4	Mountain Dew Southern 500	Darlington	ESPN	Live	Jerry Punch	Ned Jarrett; Benny Parsons	John Kernan; Marty Reid; Bill Weber
1994	September 25	Goody's 500	Martinsville	ESPN	Live	Jerry Punch	Ned Jarrett; Benny Parsons	John Kernan; Bill Weber
1994	October 2	Tyson Holly Farms 400	North Wilkesboro	ESPN	Live	Jerry Punch	Ned Jarrett; Benny Parsons	John Kernan; Bill Weber
1994	November 13	Hooters 500	Atlanta	ESPN	Live	Bob Jenkins	Ned Jarrett; Benny Parsons	Jerry Punch; John Kernan
1995	March 26	TranSouth Financial 400	Darlington	ESPN	Live	Bob Jenkins	Ned Jarrett; Benny Parsons	Jerry Punch; Bill Weber; John Kernan
1995	April 2	Food City 500	Bristol	ESPN	Live	Bob Jenkins	Ned Jarrett; Benny Parsons	Jerry Punch; Bill Weber; John Kernan
1995	April 9	First Union 400	North Wilkesboro	ESPN	Live	Bob Jenkins	Ned Jarrett; Benny Parsons	Jerry Punch; John Kernan
1995	April 23	Hanes 500	Martinsville	ESPN	Live	Bob Jenkins	Ned Jarrett; Benny Parsons	Jerry Punch; Bill Weber; John Kernan
1995	April 30	Winston Select 500	Talladega	ESPN	Live	Bob Jenkins	Ned Jarrett; Benny Parsons	Jerry Punch; Bill Weber; John Kernan
1995	May 7	Save Mart Supermarkets 300	Sonoma	ESPN	Live	Bob Jenkins	Ned Jarrett; Benny Parsons	Jerry Punch; John Kernan
1995	July 1	Pepsi 400	Daytona	ESPN; ESPN2	Live (Note: the 1995 Pepsi 400 had ESPN air the race while ESPN2 showed onboard cameras and radio with some of the teams.)	Bob Jenkins	Benny Parsons	Jerry Punch; Bill Weber; John Kernan
1995	August 5	Brickyard 400	Indianapolis	ESPN	Delayed	Bob Jenkins	Benny Parsons	Jerry Punch; Jack Arute; Gary Gerould
1995	August 13	The Bud at The Glen	Watkins Glen	ESPN	Live	Bob Jenkins	Ned Jarrett; Bill Weber; Dorsey Schroeder	Jerry Punch; John Kernan
1995	August 20	GM Goodwrench 400	Michigan	ESPN	Live	Jerry Punch	Ned Jarrett; Benny Parsons	Bill Weber; John Kernan
1995	August 26	Goody's 500	Bristol	ESPN	Live	Bob Jenkins	Ned Jarrett; Benny Parsons	Jerry Punch; Bill Weber; John Kernan
1995	September 3	Mountain Dew Southern 500	Darlington	ESPN; ESPN2	Live (Note: the 1995 Mountain Dew Southern 500 had ESPN air the race while ESPN2 showed onboard cameras and radio with some of the teams.)	Bob Jenkins	Ned Jarrett; Benny Parsons	Jerry Punch; Bill Weber; John Kernan
1995	September 24	Goody's 500	Martinsville	ESPN	Live	Bob Jenkins	Ned Jarrett; Benny Parsons	Jerry Punch; Bill Weber; John Kernan
1995	October 1	Tyson Holly Farms 400	North Wilkesboro	ESPN	Live	Bob Jenkins	Ned Jarrett; Benny Parsons	Jerry Punch; Bill Weber; John Kernan
1995	November 12	NAPA 500	Atlanta	ESPN	Live	Bob Jenkins	Ned Jarrett; Benny Parsons	Jerry Punch; Bill Weber; John Kernan
1996	March 3	Pontiac Excitement 400	Richmond	ESPN	Live	Bob Jenkins	Ned Jarrett; Benny Parsons	Jerry Punch; Bill Weber; John Kernan
1996	March 24	TranSouth Financial 400	Darlington	ESPN	Live	Bob Jenkins	Ned Jarrett; Benny Parsons	Jerry Punch; Bill Weber; John Kernan
1996	March 31	Food City 500	Bristol	ESPN	Live	Bob Jenkins	Ned Jarrett; Benny Parsons	Jerry Punch; Bill Weber; John Kernan
1996	April 14	First Union 400	North Wilkesboro	ESPN	Live	Bob Jenkins	Ned Jarrett; Benny Parsons	Jerry Punch; Bill Weber; John Kernan
1996	April 21	Goody's Headache Powder 500	Martinsville	ESPN	Live	Bob Jenkins	Ned Jarrett; Benny Parsons	Jerry Punch; Bill Weber; John Kernan
1996	April 28	Winston Select 500	Talladega	ESPN	Live	Bob Jenkins	Ned Jarrett	Jerry Punch; Bill Weber; John Kernan
1996	May 5	Save Mart Supermarkets 300	Sonoma	ESPN	Live	Bob Jenkins	Ned Jarrett; Benny Parsons	Jerry Punch; Bill Weber
1996	July 6	Pepsi 400	Daytona	ESPN	Live	Bob Jenkins	Benny Parsons	Jerry Punch; Bill Weber; John Kernan
1996	August 11	The Bud at The Glen	Watkins Glen	ESPN	Live	Bob Jenkins	Ned Jarrett; Benny Parsons	Jerry Punch; Bill Weber
1996	August 18	DeVilbiss 400	Michigan	ESPN	Live	Bob Jenkins	Ned Jarrett; Benny Parsons	Jerry Punch; Bill Weber; Dave Despain
1996	August 24	Goody's Headache Powder 500	Bristol	ESPN	Live	Bob Jenkins	Ned Jarrett; Benny Parsons	Jerry Punch; Bill Weber; John Kernan
1996	September 1	Mountain Dew Southern 500	Darlington	ESPN	Live	Bob Jenkins	Ned Jarrett; Benny Parsons	Jerry Punch; Bill Weber; John Kernan
1996	September 7	Miller 400	Richmond	ESPN	Live	Bob Jenkins	Ned Jarrett; Benny Parsons	Jerry Punch; Bill Weber; John Kernan
1996	September 22	Hanes 500	Martinsville	ESPN	Live	Bob Jenkins	Ned Jarrett; Benny Parsons	Jerry Punch; Bill Weber; John Kernan
1996	September 29	Tyson Holly Farms 400	North Wilkesboro	ESPN	Live	Bob Jenkins	Ned Jarrett; Benny Parsons	Jerry Punch; Bill Weber; John Kernan
1996	November 10	NAPA 500	Atlanta	ESPN	Live	Bob Jenkins	Ned Jarrett; Benny Parsons	Jerry Punch; Bill Weber; John Kernan
1997	March 2	Pontiac Excitement 400	Richmond	ESPN	Live	Bob Jenkins	Ned Jarrett; Benny Parsons	Jerry Punch; Bill Weber; John Kernan
1997	March 23	TranSouth Financial 400	Darlington	ESPN	Live	Bob Jenkins	Ned Jarrett; Benny Parsons	Jerry Punch; Bill Weber; John Kernan
1997	April 13	Food City 500	Bristol	ESPN	Live	Jerry Punch	Ned Jarrett; Benny Parsons	Bill Weber; John Kernan; Ray Dunlap
1997	April 20	Goody's Headache Powder 500	Martinsville	ESPN	Live	Bob Jenkins	Ned Jarrett; Benny Parsons	Jerry Punch; Bill Weber; John Kernan
1997	May 4	Save Mart Supermarkets 300	Sonoma	ESPN	Live	Bob Jenkins	Ned Jarrett; Benny Parsons	Jerry Punch; Bill Weber
1997	~~April 27~~; May 10	Winston 500	Talladega	ESPN	Live (Note: The 1997 Winston 500 was scheduled to be on April 27th but was moved back two weeks due to rain as it washed out any chance to hold the race on Sunday or Monday. To complicate matters, the series was racing the Save Mart Supermarkets 300 at Sonoma Raceway the following weekend and the travel burden for the teams would be too much to overcome if the race were to be held Tuesday as would be the normal policy (next available day). Series officials decided to have the teams pack up and depart for Sonoma, and rescheduled the Winston 500 for the weekend after that May 10th.)	Bob Jenkins	Ned Jarrett; Benny Parsons	Jerry Punch; Bill Weber; John Kernan
1997	July 5	Pepsi 400	Daytona	ESPN	Live	Bob Jenkins	Benny Parsons	Jerry Punch; Bill Weber; John Kernan
1997	August 10	The Bud at The Glen	Watkins Glen	ESPN	Live	Bob Jenkins	Ned Jarrett; Benny Parsons	Jerry Punch; Bill Weber
1997	August 17	DeVilbiss 400	Michigan	ESPN	Live	Bob Jenkins	Ned Jarrett; Benny Parsons	Jerry Punch; Bill Weber; John Kernan
1997	August 23	Goody's Headache Powder 500	Bristol	ESPN	Live	Bob Jenkins	Ned Jarrett; Benny Parsons	Jerry Punch; Bill Weber; John Kernan
1997	August 31	Mountain Dew Southern 500	Darlington	ESPN	Live	Bob Jenkins	Ned Jarrett; Benny Parsons	Jerry Punch; Bill Weber; John Kernan
1997	September 6	Exide NASCAR Select Batteries 400	Richmond	ESPN	Live	Bob Jenkins	Ned Jarrett; Benny Parsons	Jerry Punch; Bill Weber; John Kernan
1997	~~September 28~~; September 29	Hanes 500	Martinsville	ESPN	Live (Note: The 1997 Hanes 500 was scheduled to be on September 28th but rescheduled on September 29th due to a rain delay. John Kernan was there on Sunday but not on Monday.)	Bob Jenkins	Ned Jarrett; Benny Parsons	Jerry Punch; Bill Weber; ~~John Kernan~~
1997	November 16	NAPA 500	Atlanta	ESPN	Live	Bob Jenkins	Ned Jarrett; Benny Parsons	Jerry Punch; Bill Weber; John Kernan
1998	February 8	Bud Shootout Qualifier	Daytona	ESPN	Live	Bob Jenkins	Benny Parsons; Kyle Petty	Jerry Punch; Bill Weber
1998	March 9	Primestar 500	Atlanta	ESPN	Live	Bob Jenkins	Ned Jarrett; Benny Parsons	Jerry Punch; Bill Weber; Ray Dunlap
1998	March 22	TranSouth Financial 400	Darlington	ESPN	Live	Bob Jenkins	Ned Jarrett; Benny Parsons	Jerry Punch; Bill Weber; John Kernan
1998	March 29	Food City 500	Bristol	ESPN	Live	Bob Jenkins	Ned Jarrett; Benny Parsons	Bill Weber; John Kernan; Ray Dunlap
1998	~~April 19~~; April 20	Goody's Headache Powder 500	Martinsville	ESPN	Live (Note: The 1997 Hanes 500 was scheduled to be on April 19th but rescheduled on April 20th due to a rain delay. John Kernan was there on Sunday but not on Monday and replaced by Ray Dunlap on pitlane.)	Bob Jenkins	Ned Jarrett; Benny Parsons	Jerry Punch; Bill Weber; Ray Dunlap; ~~John Kernan~~
1998	May 3	California 500	California	ESPN	Live	Bob Jenkins	Ned Jarrett; Benny Parsons	Jerry Punch; Bill Weber; John Kernan
1998	June 6	Pontiac Excitement 400	Richmond	ESPN	Live	Bob Jenkins	Ned Jarrett; Benny Parsons	Jerry Punch; Bill Weber; John Kernan
1998	June 28	Save Mart/Kragen 350	Sonoma	ESPN; ESPN2 (Note: The 1998 Save Mart/Kragen 350 saw coverage start on ESPN2 due to ESPN airing a Golf playoff before coverage moved to ESPN after the golf finished.)	Live	Bob Jenkins	Ned Jarrett; Benny Parsons	Jerry Punch; Bill Weber; John Kernan
1998	August 9	The Bud at The Glen	Watkins Glen	ESPN	Live	Bob Jenkins	Ned Jarrett; Benny Parsons	Jerry Punch; Bill Weber; John Kernan
1998	August 16	Pepsi 400	Michigan	ESPN	Live	Bob Jenkins	Ned Jarrett; Benny Parsons	Jerry Punch; Bill Weber; John Kernan
1998	August 22	Goody's Headache Powder 500	Bristol	ESPN	Live	Bob Jenkins	Ned Jarrett; Benny Parsons	Jerry Punch; Bill Weber; John Kernan
1998	September 6	Pepsi Southern 500	Darlington	ESPN	Live	Bob Jenkins	Ned Jarrett; Benny Parsons	Jerry Punch; Bill Weber; John Kernan
1998	September 12	Exide NASCAR Select Batteries 400	Richmond	ESPN	Live	Bob Jenkins	Ned Jarrett; Benny Parsons	Jerry Punch; Bill Weber; John Kernan
1998	September 27	NAPA Autocare 500	Martinsville	ESPN	Live	Bob Jenkins	Ned Jarrett; Benny Parsons	Jerry Punch; Bill Weber; John Kernan
1998	October 11	Winston 500	Talladega	ESPN	Live	Bob Jenkins	Ned Jarrett; Benny Parsons	Jerry Punch; John Kernan; Bill Weber
1998	November 8	NAPA 500	Atlanta	ESPN; ESPN2 (Note: The 1998 NAPA 500 saw coverage start on ESPN but move to ESPN2 due to multiple rain delays.)	Live	Bob Jenkins	Ned Jarrett; Benny Parsons	Jerry Punch; Bill Weber; John Kernan
1999	February 7	Bud Shootout Qualifier	Daytona	ESPN	Live	Bob Jenkins	Benny Parsons; Kyle Petty	Jerry Punch; Bill Weber
1999	March 21	TranSouth Financial 400	Darlington	ESPN	Live	Bob Jenkins	Ned Jarrett; Benny Parsons	Jerry Punch; Bill Weber; John Kernan
1999	April 11	Food City 500	Bristol	ESPN	Live	Bob Jenkins	Ned Jarrett; Benny Parsons	Jerry Punch; Bill Weber; John Kernan
1999	April 18	Goody's Body Pain 500	Martinsville	ESPN	Live	Bob Jenkins	Ned Jarrett; Benny Parsons	Jerry Punch; Bill Weber; John Kernan
1999	May 15	Pontiac Excitement 400	Richmond	ESPN	Live	Bob Jenkins	Ned Jarrett; Benny Parsons	Jerry Punch; Bill Weber; John Kernan
1999	June 27	Save Mart/Kragen 350	Sonoma	ESPN	Live	Bob Jenkins	Ned Jarrett; Benny Parsons	Jerry Punch; Bill Weber; John Kernan
1999	August 15	Frontier at The Glen	Watkins Glen	ESPN	Live	Bob Jenkins	Ned Jarrett	Jerry Punch; Bill Weber; John Kernan
1999	August 22	Pepsi 400	Michigan	ESPN	Live	Bob Jenkins	Ned Jarrett; Benny Parsons	Jerry Punch; Bill Weber; John Kernan
1999	August 28	Goody's Headache Powder 500	Bristol	ESPN	Live	Bob Jenkins	Ned Jarrett; Benny Parsons	Jerry Punch; Bill Weber; John Kernan
1999	September 5	The 50th Pepsi Southern 500	Darlington	ESPN	Live	Bob Jenkins	Ned Jarrett; Benny Parsons	Jerry Punch; Bill Weber; John Kernan
1999	September 11	Exide NASCAR Select Batteries 400	Richmond	ESPN	Live	Bob Jenkins	Ned Jarrett; Benny Parsons	Jerry Punch; Bill Weber; Ray Dunlap
1999	October 3	NAPA Autocare 500	Martinsville	ESPN	Live	Bob Jenkins	Ned Jarrett; Benny Parsons	Jerry Punch; Bill Weber; John Kernan
1999	October 17	Winston 500	Talladega	ESPN	Live	Jerry Punch	Ned Jarrett; Benny Parsons	Bill Weber; John Kernan; Ray Dunlap
1999	November 21	NAPA 500	Atlanta	ESPN	Live	Bob Jenkins	Ned Jarrett; Benny Parsons	Jerry Punch; Bill Weber; John Kernan
2000	February 13	Bud Shootout Qualifier	Daytona	ESPN	Live	Bob Jenkins	Benny Parsons; Ray Evernham	Jerry Punch; Bill Weber
2000	March 19	Mall.com 400	Darlington	ESPN	Live	Jerry Punch	Ned Jarrett; Benny Parsons	Bill Weber; John Kernan; Ray Dunlap
2000	March 26	Food City 500	Bristol	ESPN	Live	Bob Jenkins	Ned Jarrett; Benny Parsons	Jerry Punch; Bill Weber; John Kernan
2000	April 9	Goody's Body Pain 500	Martinsville	ESPN	Live	Bob Jenkins	Ned Jarrett; Benny Parsons	Jerry Punch; Bill Weber; John Kernan
2000	May 6	Pontiac Excitement 400	Richmond	ESPN	Live	Bob Jenkins	Ned Jarrett; Benny Parsons	Jerry Punch; Bill Weber; John Kernan
2000	June 25	Save Mart/Kragen 350	Sonoma	ESPN	Live	Bob Jenkins	Ned Jarrett; Benny Parsons	Jerry Punch; Bill Weber; John Kernan
2000	August 13	Global Crossing @ the Glen	Watkins Glen	ESPN	Live	Bob Jenkins	Ned Jarrett; Benny Parsons	Jerry Punch; Bill Weber; John Kernan
2000	August 20	Pepsi 400	Michigan	ESPN	Live	Bob Jenkins	Ned Jarrett; Benny Parsons	Jerry Punch; Bill Weber; John Kernan
2000	August 26	goracing.com 500	Bristol	ESPN	Live	Jerry Punch	Ned Jarrett; Benny Parsons	Bill Weber; John Kernan; Ray Dunlap
2000	September 3	Pepsi Southern 500	Darlington	ESPN; ESPN2 (Note: The 2000 Pepsi Southern 500 saw coverage start on ESPN but move to ESPN2 due to a rain delay.)	Live	Bob Jenkins	Ned Jarrett; Benny Parsons	Jerry Punch; Bill Weber; John Kernan
2000	September 9	Chevrolet Monte Carlo 400	Richmond	ESPN	Live	Bob Jenkins	Ned Jarrett; Benny Parsons	Jerry Punch; Bill Weber; John Kernan
2000	October 1	NAPA Autocare 500	Martinsville	ESPN	Live	Bob Jenkins	Ned Jarrett; Benny Parsons	Jerry Punch; Bill Weber; John Kernan
2000	October 15	Winston 500	Talladega	ESPN	Live	Jerry Punch	Ned Jarrett; Benny Parsons	Bill Weber; John Kernan; Ray Dunlap
2000	~~November 19~~; November 20	NAPA 500	Atlanta	ESPN	Live (Note: The 2000 NAPA 500 was scheduled to be on November 19th but rescheduled on November 20th due to a rain delay.)	Bob Jenkins	Ned Jarrett; Benny Parsons	Jerry Punch; Bill Weber; John Kernan; Ray Dunlap

=== Xfinity ===
==== 1982-2000 (ESPN) ====
Year	Date	Event	Track	Network	Coverage	Commentary		Pit Reporters
Year	Date	Event	Track	Network	Coverage	Lap-by-lap	Color	Pit Reporters
1992	February 15	Goody's 300	Daytona	ESPN	Live	Bob Jenkins	Benny Parsons	Jerry Punch; John Kernan
1993	February 13	Goody's 300	Daytona	ESPN	Live	Bob Jenkins	Benny Parsons	Jerry Punch; John Kernan
1994	February 19	Goody's 300	Daytona	ESPN	Live	Bob Jenkins	Benny Parsons	Jerry Punch; Kyle Petty
1994	August 5	Kroger 200	IRP	ESPN	Live	Jerry Punch	Ned Jarrett	John Kernan; Gary Lee
1995	February 18	Goody's 300	Daytona	ESPN	Live	Bob Jenkins	Benny Parsons; Kyle Petty	Jerry Punch; John Kernan
1996	February 17	Goody's Headache Powder 300	Daytona	ESPN	Live	Bob Jenkins	Benny Parsons; Kyle Petty	Jerry Punch; Bill Weber
1996	March 2	Hardee's Fried Chicken 250	Richmond	ESPN2	Live	Jerry Punch	Ned Jarrett; Benny Parsons	Bill Weber; Kyle Petty
1996	March 9	Busch Light 300	Atlanta	ESPN2	Delayed	Jerry Punch	Ned Jarrett; Benny Parsons	Bill Weber; Kyle Petty
1996	March 23	Dura Lube 200	Darlington	ESPN	Live	Jerry Punch	Ned Jarrett; Benny Parsons	Bill Weber; Kyle Petty
1996	March 30	Goody's Headache Powder 250	Bristol	ESPN2	Live	Jerry Punch	Ned Jarrett; Benny Parsons	Bill Weber; Kyle Petty
1996	August 2	Kroger 200	IRP	ESPN	Live	Jerry Punch	Ned Jarrett	Bill Weber; Dave Despain
1996	August 16	Detroit Gasket 200	Michigan	ESPN	Live	Jerry Punch	Ned Jarrett; Benny Parsons	Bill Weber; Dave Despain
1996	August 23	Food City 250	Bristol	ESPN	Live	Jerry Punch	Ned Jarrett; Kyle Petty	Benny Parsons; Bill Weber
1997	March 1	Hardee's Fried Chicken 250	Richmond	ESPN2	Live	Jerry Punch	Ned Jarrett; Benny Parsons	Bill Weber; Ray Dunlap; Kyle Petty
1997	March 8	Stihl Outdoor Power Tools 300	Atlanta	ESPN2	Live	Jerry Punch	Ned Jarrett; Benny Parsons	Bill Weber; Kyle Petty
1997	March 22	Diamond Hill Plywood 200	Darlington	ESPN	Live	Jerry Punch	Ned Jarrett; Benny Parsons	Bill Weber; Ray Dunlap; Kyle Petty
1997	April 12	Moore's Snacks 250	Bristol	ESPN	Live	Bob Jenkins	Ned Jarrett; Benny Parsons	Bill Weber; Kyle Petty
1997	April 26	Touchstone Energy 300	Talladega	ESPN	Live	Jerry Punch	Ned Jarrett; Benny Parsons	Bill Weber; Ray Dunlap
1997	May 18	First Union 200	Nazareth	ESPN	Live	Bob Jenkins	Benny Parsons	Bill Weber; Ray Dunlap
1997	July 31	Kroger 200 presented by Ziploc	IRP	ESPN	Live	Jerry Punch	Brett Bodine	Bill Weber; Dave Despain
1997	August 17	Detroit Gasket 200	Michigan	ESPN	Live	Jerry Punch	Ned Jarrett; Benny Parsons	Bill Weber; Kyle Petty
1997	August 23	Food City 250	Bristol	ESPN	Live	Jerry Punch	Ned Jarrett; Benny Parsons	Bill Weber; Kyle Petty
1997	August 30	Dura-Lube 200 Presented by BI-LO	Darlington	ESPN	Live	Jerry Punch	Ned Jarrett; Benny Parsons	Bill Weber; John Kernan; Kyle Petty
1997	September 5	Autolite Platinum 250	Richmond	ESPN	Live	Jerry Punch	Ned Jarrett; Benny Parsons	Bill Weber; Ray Dunlap
1997	October 19	Kenwood Home & Car Audio 300	California	ESPN	Live	Jerry Punch	Benny Parsons; Kyle Petty	Bill Weber; Marty Reid
1998	February 28	Sam's Town Las Vegas 300	Las Vegas	ESPN	Live	Jerry Punch	Benny Parsons; Kyle Petty	Bill Weber; Ray Dunlap
1998	March 21	Diamond Hill Plywood 200	Darlington	ESPN	Live	Jerry Punch	Benny Parsons; Kyle Petty	Bill Weber; Ray Dunlap
1998	March 28	Moore's Snacks 250	Bristol	ESPN	Live	Bob Jenkins	Benny Parsons; Kyle Petty	Bill Weber; Ray Dunlap
1998	May 17	First Union 200	Nazareth	ESPN2	Live	Bob Jenkins	Benny Parsons	Bill Weber; Ray Dunlap
1998	June 5	Hardee's 250	Richmond	ESPN2	Live	Jerry Punch	Benny Parsons; Kyle Petty	Bill Weber; Ray Dunlap
1998	June 14	Lycos.com 250	Pikes Peak	ESPN	Live	Jerry Punch	Steve Park	John Kernan; Marty Reid
1998	June 28	Lysol 200	Watkins Glen	ESPN	Live	Dave Despain	Steve Park	Marty Reid; Ray Dunlap
1998	July 19	Kenwood Home & Car Audio 300	California	ESPN	Live	Jerry Punch	Benny Parsons	Bill Weber; Ray Dunlap
1998	July 31	Kroger 200	IRP	ESPN	Live	Jerry Punch	Chad Little	Bill Weber; Marty Reid
1998	August 15	Pepsi 200 Presented by DeVilbiss	Michigan	ESPN	Live	Jerry Punch	Benny Parsons; Kyle Petty	Bill Weber; Ray Dunlap
1998	August 21	Food City 250	Bristol	ESPN	Live	Jerry Punch	Benny Parsons; Kyle Petty	Bill Weber; Ray Dunlap
1998	September 5	Dura-Lube 200 Presented by BI-LO	Darlington	ESPN	Live	Jerry Punch	Benny Parsons; Kyle Petty	Bill Weber; Ray Dunlap
1998	September 11	Autolite Platinum 250	Richmond	ESPN	Live	Jerry Punch	Benny Parsons; Kyle Petty	Bill Weber; Ray Dunlap
1998	~~March 7~~; November 7	Yellow Freight 300	Atlanta	ESPN2; ESPN	Live (Note: The 1998 Yellow Freight 300 was scheduled to on March 7th and aired on ESPN2 but was rain delayed and with it continuing into Monday meant the race was rescheduled to November 7th and aired on ESPN.)	Jerry Punch	Benny Parsons; Kyle Petty	Bill Weber; Ray Dunlap
1998	November 15	Jiffy Lube Miami 300	Homestead–Miami	ESPN	Live	Jerry Punch	Benny Parsons; Kyle Petty	Bill Weber; Ray Dunlap
1999	March 6	Sam's Town 300	Las Vegas	ESPN2	Live	Jerry Punch	Benny Parsons; Kyle Petty	Bill Weber; Ray Dunlap
1999	March 13	Yellow Freight 300	Atlanta	ESPN	Live	Jerry Punch	Benny Parsons; Kyle Petty	Bill Weber; Ray Dunlap
1999	March 20	Diamond Hill Plywood 200	Darlington	ESPN	Live	Jerry Punch	Ned Jarrett; Kyle Petty	Bill Weber; Ray Dunlap
1999	April 10	Moore's Snacks 250	Bristol	ESPN	Live	Jerry Punch	Benny Parsons; Kyle Petty	Bill Weber; Ray Dunlap
1999	May 1	Auto Club 300	California	ABC; ESPN2	Live	Jerry Punch	Benny Parsons; Kyle Petty	Bill Weber; Ray Dunlap
1999	May 14	Hardee's 250	Richmond	ESPN2	Live	Jerry Punch	Benny Parsons; Kyle Petty	Bill Weber; Ray Dunlap
1999	May 23	First Union 200	Nazareth	ESPN2	Live	Ray Dunlap	Kyle Petty	Bill Weber; Matt Yocum
1999	June 27	Lysol 200	Watkins Glen	ESPN	Live	Marty Reid	Jeremy Dale	Dave Burns; Amy East
1999	July 24	NAPA Autocare 250	Pikes Peak	ESPN2	Live	Bob Jenkins	Benny Parsons	Jerry Punch; Ray Dunlap
1999	August 6	Kroger 200	IRP	ESPN	Live	Jerry Punch	Ned Jarrett	Marty Reid; Dave Burns
1999	August 21	NAPA 200	Michigan	ESPN	Live	Jerry Punch	Benny Parsons; Kyle Petty	Bill Weber; Ray Dunlap
1999	August 27	Food City 250	Bristol	ESPN2	Live	Jerry Punch	Benny Parsons; Kyle Petty	Bill Weber; Ray Dunlap
1999	September 4	Dura Lube 200	Darlington	ESPN2	Live	Jerry Punch	Benny Parsons; Kyle Petty	Bill Weber; Ray Dunlap
1999	September 10	Autolite Platinum 250	Richmond	ESPN	Live	Jerry Punch	Benny Parsons; Kyle Petty	Bill Weber; Ray Dunlap
2000	March 4	Sam's Town 300	Las Vegas	ESPN2	Live	Jerry Punch	Benny Parsons; Kyle Petty	Bill Weber; Ray Dunlap
2000	March 11	Aaron's 312	Atlanta	ABC; ESPN2	Live	Jerry Punch	Benny Parsons	Bill Weber; Ray Dunlap
2000	March 18	SunCom 200	Darlington	ESPN	Live	Jerry Punch	Benny Parsons	Bill Weber; Ray Dunlap
2000	March 25	Cheez-It 250	Bristol	ESPN2	Live	Jerry Punch	Benny Parsons	Bill Weber; Ray Dunlap
2000	April 15	Touchstone Energy 300	Talladega	ESPN2	Live	Jerry Punch	Benny Parsons; Ray Evernham	Bill Weber; Ray Dunlap
2000	April 29	Auto Club 300	California	ESPN	Live	Jerry Punch	Benny Parsons; Ray Evernham	Bill Weber; Ray Dunlap
2000	May 5	Hardee's 250	Richmond	ESPN2	Live	Jerry Punch	Benny Parsons	Bill Weber; Ray Dunlap
2000	June 25	Lysol 200	Watkins Glen	ESPN	Live	Marty Reid	Jeremy Dale	Dave Burns; Amy East
2000	July 16	Econo Lodge 200	Nazareth	ESPN	Live	Jerry Punch	Benny Parsons	Bill Weber; Ray Dunlap
2000	July 22	NAPA Autocare 250	Pikes Peak	ESPN2	Live	Bob Jenkins	Benny Parsons	Jerry Punch; Ray Dunlap
2000	August 5	Kroger 200	IRP	ESPN	Live	Marty Reid	Ned Jarrett	Dave Burns; Matt Yocum
2000	August 19	NAPAonline.com 250	Michigan	ESPN	Live	Jerry Punch	Benny Parsons	Bill Weber; Ray Dunlap
2000	August 25	Food City 250	Bristol	ESPN	Live	Jerry Punch	Benny Parsons	Bill Weber; Ray Dunlap
2000	September 2	Dura Lube / All Pro Bumper to Bumper 200	Darlington	ESPN	Live	Jerry Punch	Benny Parsons	Bill Weber; Ray Dunlap
2000	September 8	Autolite / Fram 250	Richmond	ESPN2	Live	Jerry Punch	Benny Parsons	Bill Weber; Ray Dunlap

==== 1998-2000 (ABC) ====
Year	Date	Event	Track	Network	Coverage	Commentary		Pit Reporters
Year	Date	Event	Track	Network	Coverage	Lap-by-lap	Color	Pit Reporters
1998	April 25	Touchstone Energy 300	Talladega	ABC	Live	Jerry Punch	Benny Parsons; Kyle Petty	Bill Weber; Jack Arute
1999	April 24	Touchstone Energy 300	Talladega	ABC	Live	Jerry Punch	Benny Parsons; Kyle Petty	Bill Weber; Ray Dunlap
1999	May 1	Auto Club 300	California	ABC; ESPN2 (Note: The 1999 Auto Club 300 saw coverage move from ABC to ESPN2 due to ABC airing the 125th Kentucky Derby.)	Live	Jerry Punch	Benny Parsons; Kyle Petty	Bill Weber; Ray Dunlap
2000	March 11	Aaron's 312	Atlanta	ABC; ESPN2 (Note: The 2000 Aaron's 312 saw coverage move from ABC to ESPN2 due to a rain delay.)	Live	Jerry Punch	Benny Parsons	Bill Weber; Ray Dunlap

=== Trucks ===
==== 1995-2002 (ESPN) ====
Year	Date	Event	Track	Network	Coverage	Commentary		Pit Reporters
Year	Date	Event	Track	Network	Coverage	Lap-by-lap	Color	Pit Reporters
1995	April 8	Racing Champions 200	Tucson	ESPN	Live	Dave Despain	Elton Sawyer	Marty Reid
1995	June 3	Ford Credit 200	Louisville	ESPN	Live	Dave Despain	Benny Parsons	Marty Reid
1995	June 23	Pizza Plus 150	Bristol	ESPN	Live	Dave Despain	Benny Parsons	Marty Reid
1995	August 3	Action Packed Racing Cards 150	IRP	ESPN	Live	Dave Despain	Benny Parsons; Ned Jarrett	Marty Reid
1995	September 7	Fas Mart Supertruck Shootout	Richmond	ESPN2	Live	Dave Despain	Benny Parsons	Marty Reid
1995	September 25	Goody's 150	Martinsville	ESPN2	Live	Dave Despain	Benny Parsons	Marty Reid
1995	September 30	Goody's 150	North Wilkesboro	ESPN	Live	Dave Despain	Benny Parsons	Marty Reid
1996	May 25	NAPA 200	Tucson	ESPN	Live	Dave Despain	Benny Parsons	Rick DeBruhl
1996	June 22	Coca-Cola 200	Bristol	ESPN	Live	Dave Despain	Benny Parsons	Marty Reid
1996	August 1	Cummins 200	IRP	ESPN	Live	Dave Despain	Benny Parsons	Marty Reid
1996	August 25	Parts America 150	Watkins Glen	ESPN	Live	Dave Despain	Benny Parsons	Marty Reid
1996	September 5	Fas Mart Truck Shootout	Richmond	ESPN2	Live	Dave Despain	Benny Parsons	Marty Reid
1996	September 21	Hanes 250	Martinsville	ESPN	Live	Dave Despain	Benny Parsons; Kyle Petty	Marty Reid
1996	September 28	Lowe's 250	North Wilkesboro	ESPN	Live	Dave Despain	Benny Parsons; Kyle Petty	Marty Reid
1996	October 5	Kragen 151	Sears Point	ESPN2	Live	Dave Despain	Benny Parsons	Marty Reid

==== 1995-1999 (ABC) ====
Year	Date	Event	Track	Network	Coverage	Commentary		Pit Reporters
Year	Date	Event	Track	Network	Coverage	Lap-by-lap	Color	Pit Reporters
1995	April 22	Ford Credit 125	Mesa Marin	ABC	Live	Paul Page	Jack Arute	Phil Parsons
1999	March 20	Florida Dodge Dealers 400	Homestead-Miami	ABC	Live	Marty Reid	Benny Parsons	Jon Beekhuis; Gary Gerould

== See also ==
- NASCAR Countdown
- NASCAR Now
- NASCAR Drivers: Non-Stop
- ESPN2 Garage
- Jayski's Silly Season Site
- NASCAR in Primetime
