= Bootie Barker =

NASCAR crew chief

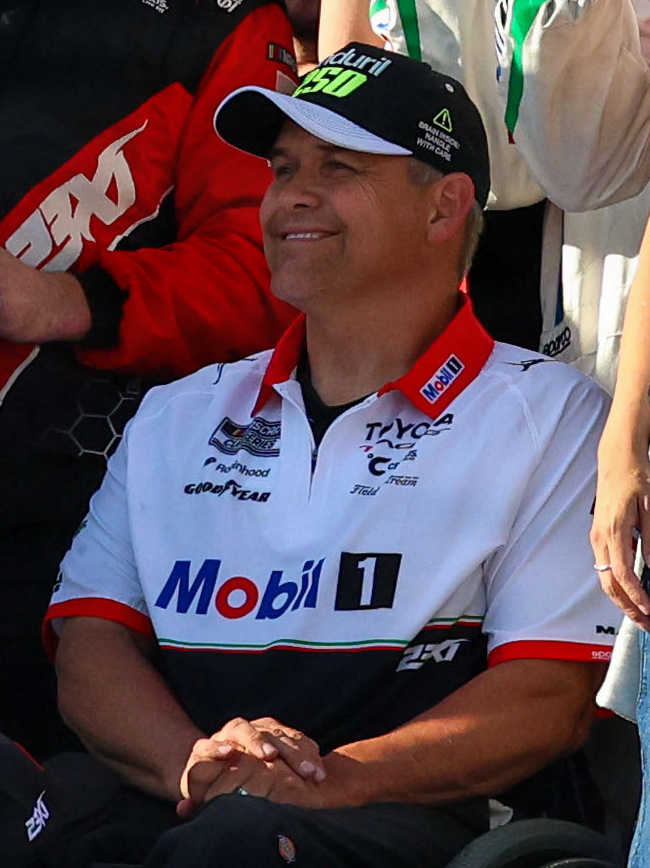
- Barker at Naval Base Coronado in 2026

Personal information
- Born: Robert Aldridge Barker III; March 2, 1971 (age 55) Halifax, Virginia, U.S.
- Spouse: Christy Smith-Barker

Sport
- Country: United States
- Sport: NASCAR

Robert Aldridge "Bootie" Barker III (born March 2, 1971) is an American professional stock car racing former crew chief who currently works for 23XI Racing in the competition department. In the past, Barker has worked for Ashton Lewis, Bill Davis Racing, Jasper Motorsports, Hendrick Motorsports and Germain Racing. Barker was also a television co-host on NASCAR Performance, a weekly program on the now-defunct Speed Channel.

== Early life ==
Barker grew up just next door to South Boston Speedway but was a fan of "stick and ball" sports rather than car racing. He played football as a linebacker and was paralyzed from the waist down after sustaining injuries in a car accident while a senior at Halifax County High School. Barker studied engineering at Old Dominion University and his focus was quickly redirected to motorsports. Barker graduated with a degree in mechanical engineering in 1994.

As a junior studying mechanical engineering, Barker heard Benny Parsons on the radio talking about engineers who build shock absorbers for race cars, Barker realized that racing would be the perfect industry for putting his engineering degree to use while still maintaining his interest in competition. Shortly after hearing Parsons, Barker began to spend time in the infield at South Boston Speedway.

Barker's first racing job was selling tires in South Boston and working for driver Ashton Lewis on his late model team. Barker has written a variety of magazine columns over the years and has been a regular guest on NASCAR RaceHub on Fox Sports 1.

== Racing career ==
=== Haas CNC Racing: 2006-2007 ===
For most of 2006, Barker was the crew chief for the No. 66 Haas CNC Racing Chevrolet driven by Jeff Green. His visibility to NASCAR fans increased in 2006. Barker wrote a weekly column for NASCAR.com titled "Urban Legends," in which he addressed myths and questions about various aspects of racing. Barker was also a frequent guest on NASCAR RaceDay, a preview show for weekly NASCAR events on the now defunct Speed Channel.

In 2007, Barker was the crew chief for Johnny Sauter and the No. 70 Haas CNC Racing Chevrolet. The team had two top tens with finishes of 9th at Phoenix in the Subway Fresh Fit 500 and 5th at Richmond in the Chevy Rock & Roll 400. That August, Barker and the No. 70 team were featured as part of ABC's NASCAR in Primetime, a television show that gives a behind-the-scenes look at the preparation, logistics, drama and competition of NASCAR.

=== Michael Waltrip Racing: 2009 ===
On October 1, 2008, Michael Waltrip Racing (MWR) announced that Barker would be the crew chief of the No. 55 Toyota driven by two-time Daytona 500 champion Michael Waltrip for the 2009 Sprint Cup Series season.

=== Germain Racing: 2010-2017 ===
In January 2010, Germain Racing announced that Barker would be the crew chief ot the No. 13 Toyota driven by Max Papis for the 2010 Sprint Cup Series season.

=== Joe Gibbs Racing: 2018 ===
In February 2018, Joe Gibbs Racing (JGR) announced that it hired Barker to its ARCA Racing Series program with Riley Herbst.

=== 23XI Racing: 2021-present ===
In September 2021, 23XI Racing announced that Barker would take over as crew chief for the No. 23 Toyota driven by Bubba Wallace after Mike Wheeler was promoted to Director of Competition. Barker's first race as crew chief for Bubba Wallace took place at the Bass Pro Shops NRA Night Race at Bristol Motor Speedway.

On Monday, October 4, 2021, Barker earned his first win as a Cup crew chief (and 23XI Racing's first win) when Bubba Wallace won the rain-shortened YellaWood 500 at Talladega Superspeedway.

On March 29, 2022, Barker was suspended for four races due to a tire and wheel loss during the 2022 Texas Grand Prix at COTA. Dave Rogers was announced as Wallace's crew chief for Richmond, Martinsville, Bristol, and Talladega. When Wallace's 23XI teammate Kurt Busch got a concussion in a crash in qualifying for the 2022 Cup Series race at Pocono, Ty Gibbs filled in for him in the No. 45 car starting that weekend. When the playoffs started, Kurt was not ready to return but the No. 45 car was qualified for the owner's playoffs due to its win at Kansas in May. 23XI decided to move Wallace from the No. 23 to the No. 45 to compete for the owner's championship, with Gibbs moving to Wallace's No. 23 car, which did not qualify for the owner's playoffs. Barker and 23XI's other crew chief, Billy Scott, switched cars along with their drivers, and Barker continued to crew chief Wallace on the No. 45 car when the playoffs started.

Following the 2024 Martinsville playoff race, the No. 23 was docked 50 owner and driver points and Wallace and the team were each fined US$100,000 for race manipulation, when Wallace faked a tire failure and slowed down to allow fellow Toyota driver Christopher Bell to pass him in an attempt to make the Championship 4. In addition, the Martinsville race was Barker's final race as Wallace's crew chief as he was suspended for the Phoenix finale.

On February 23, 2025, when it was announced that Corey Heim had signed a multi-year deal with 23XI to be the teams development driver, it was announced that Barker would crew chief their No. 67 car with Heim.

In 2026, Barker earned his third win as a Cup crew chief, when Heim won his first career Cup Series race in the Anduril 250 at the Qualcomm Circuit on Naval Base Coronado. He won the Brickyard 400 with Heim the following month.
