= NASCAR Drivers: Non-Stop =

- Country of origin: United States
- No. of seasons: 3

Original release
- Network: ESPN2
- Release: 2004 – 2006

NASCAR Drivers: Non-Stop is an hour-long television series that aired on ESPN2 that profiles at least three different drivers during a particular Nextel Cup or Busch Series race weekend. The show coincides with the latter half of the NASCAR broadcast schedule. The show's first two seasons ran on FX Networks on Friday nights and was known as NASCAR Drivers: 360.

The series of episodes gives the viewer a behind-the-scenes view of what the drivers do between the different race weekends as well as how they perform in individual races. The first half of the episode would show the driver away from the track usually with family and friends, while the last half of the show usually details how each of the drivers perform in each of their race weekend events.

When the show was on FX Network the theme was composed by Niels Bye Nielsen. Since its move to ESPN2 the show has received a new theme and music, in a slightly faster paced style.

== Seasonal overview ==
=== Season 1 (2004) ===
The first season features Nextel Cup drivers Ward Burton, Kurt Busch, Kevin Harvick, Jeremy Mayfield, Jamie McMurray, Casey Mears, Brian Vickers, Kenny Wallace, Rusty Wallace, and Scott Wimmer.

- Season 1 Highlights: Rusty Wallace starts his Busch Series team, Kenny Wallace racing in his Busch Series team. Kevin Harvick receives his ring for winning the Brickyard 400. Final NASCAR weekend at North Carolina Speedway for Nextel Cup and Busch Series until Busch returns in 2025 rebranded as the NASCAR Xfinity Series.

=== Season 2 (2005) ===
The second season features Nextel Cup drivers Kurt Busch, Robby Gordon, Kevin Harvick, Kasey Kahne, Mark Martin, Jamie McMurray, Rusty Wallace, and Busch Series driver Kenny Wallace.

- Season 2 Highlights: Mark Martin spending time with his wife and son at their residence in Florida, Kevin Harvick and his wife spending time with Kevin's crew and other family members, Jamie McMurray discussing plans on building his new house. Rusty Wallace in his last season before retiring from NASCAR.

=== Season 3 (2006) ===
The third season features Nextel Cup drivers Jeremy Mayfield, J. J. Yeley, Clint Bowyer, Casey Mears, David Stremme, David Gilliland.
