= Bill Weber =

American sports announcer (1957–2024)

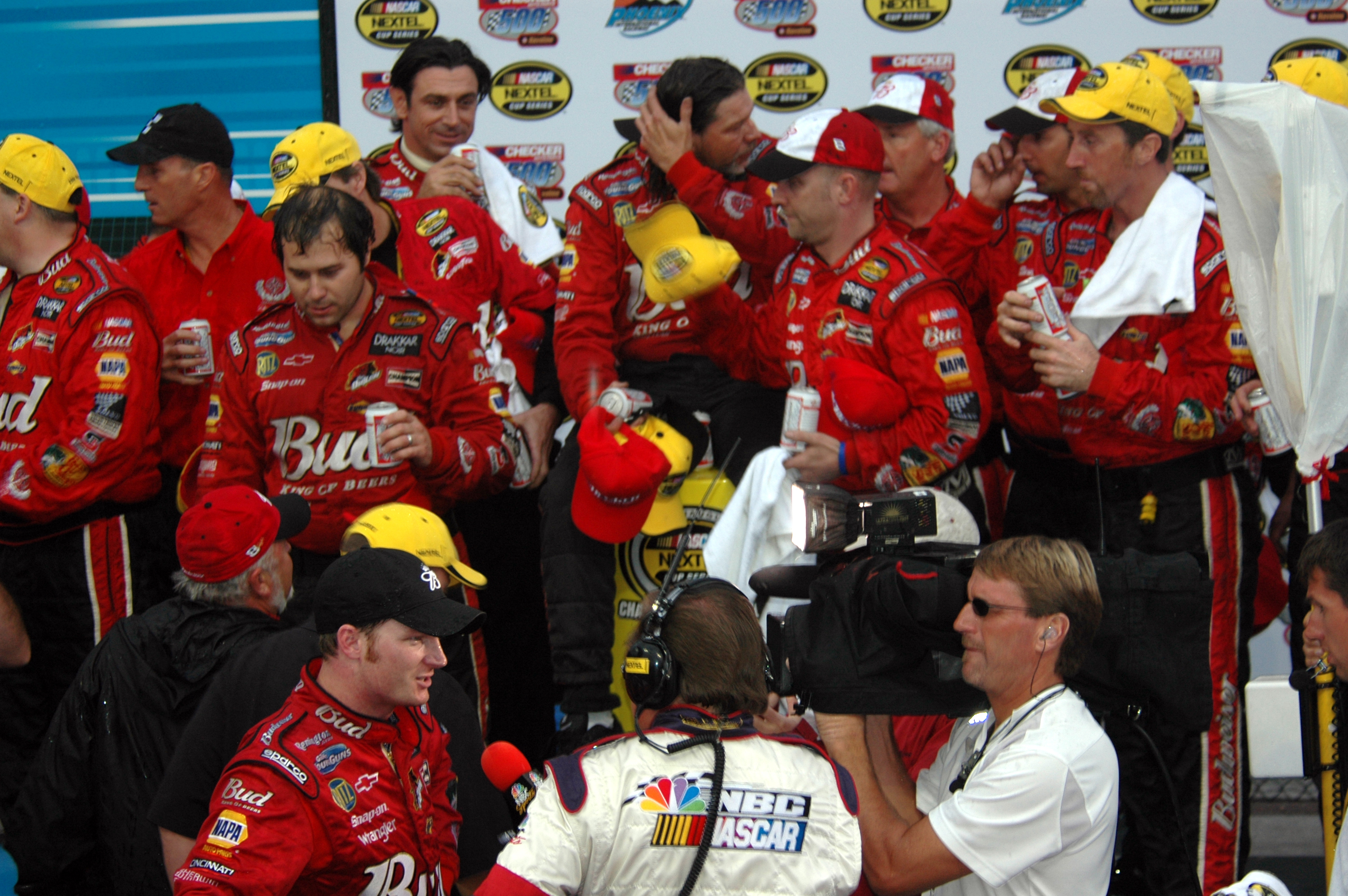
- Weber interviewing Dale Earnhardt Jr. in victory lane at Phoenix Raceway in November 2004
- Born: May 8, 1957; Summit, New Jersey, U.S.
- Died: December 13, 2024 (aged 67)
- Occupation: Sportscaster
- Television: NASCAR on NBC, NASCAR on TNT

William Weber (May 8, 1957 – December 13, 2024) was an American television sports commentator best known for his work on TNT and NBC NASCAR broadcasts. Weber was also the lead announcer for Champ Car World Series events and other auto racing series on NBC and worked as an illusionist in St. Petersburg, Florida.

== Biography ==
=== Early life and career ===
Weber was born in Middletown Township, New Jersey. He was born the second-eldest of four children, 2 boys and 2 girls. His career began at WISH-TV in Indianapolis as a sports reporter while a student at Butler University. After graduating in 1979 with a Bachelor of Science degree in radio and television and a minor in journalism, Weber served as sports director at stations in Terre Haute, Indiana and Evansville, Indiana.

In 1987, Weber left television to work on the Miller Brewing Company's Unlimited Hydroplane Racing program as a media relations consultant. He then returned to Evansville and radio. In 1990, he relocated to Charlotte, North Carolina to work for a Sunbelt Video, a production company, which has since been purchased by NASCAR and is known as NASCAR Digital Media. Around 2000, he married his wife Theresa. They remained married until his death.

Weber spent time working for TNN as part of the Inside NASCAR.

=== ESPN ===
Weber signed on with the ESPN and ESPN2 cable networks (and later with ABC) in 1994 as a pit-road reporter, and as a contributing reporter on RPM 2Night from 1996 until 2000.

=== NBC Sports and TNT Sports ===
In 2001, Weber was tapped as pre-race host and pit reporter for NBC and TNT's coverage of NASCAR. For part of the 2004 season, Weber replaced Allen Bestwick as lap-by-lap announcer when Bestwick broke his leg during a charity ice hockey game in Rhode Island. On December 14, 2004, this switch was made permanent after weeks of rumors.

Prior to broadcasting NASCAR races, Weber had play-by-play experience. He was one of NBC's play-by-play announcers for its regional coverage of the Arena Football League.

On July 30, 2006, TNT announced that Bill Weber would continue as voice of NASCAR on TNT even after contracts with NBC come to an end at the conclusion of the 2006 NASCAR Nextel Cup Series season.

The NBC and TNT partnership continued with Weber hosting coverage of the North American International Auto Show for NBC, and both Weber and Dallenbach assigned to NBC's Champ Car World Series events in April 2007. The pair also called NBC's American Le Mans Series races.

Weber and commentators Wally Dallenbach Jr. and Benny Parsons made cameo appearances as themselves in the 2006 Will Ferrell NASCAR comedy Talladega Nights: The Ballad of Ricky Bobby.

In 2009, while in New Hampshire to cover the NASCAR Sprint Cup race, Weber was suspended by TNT and was not allowed to call the race or appear on the air. TNT senior vice president Sal Petruzzi stated: “As this is a private issue, it’s the policy of the company not to discuss personal matters involving our employees.” Other reports indicated that Weber got into a loud confrontation in his hotel lobby regarding complaints about his hotel room. On July 1, 2009, TNT and NASCAR announced that Weber would be replaced by Ralph Sheheen for the final two races of TNT's 2009 schedule.

== Notable calls ==
Weber was on the call for several notable races as lap-by-lap announcer. His only Daytona 500 call was in 2006, when Jimmie Johnson won his first Daytona 500. Later that season, Weber also called Johnson's first Cup Series championship at the Ford 400, the first of five consecutive titles for Johnson. Weber also called the July Daytona race in 2005, 2007, and 2008.

== Later life and death ==
Following his dismissal from TNT, Weber worked as an illusionist at a hotel in St. Petersburg, Florida.

His voice was heard on a commercial for Acorn Stairlifts and driver James Jakes during IndyCar Series races in April 2014.

Weber died on December 13, 2024, at the age of 67.
