= NASCAR in Primetime =

- Country of origin: United States
- No. of episodes: 5

Production
- Executive producers: Rudy Bednar; Michael Bicks
- Producers: George Kachadorian; Samantha Chapman; Bryan Taylor
- Running time: 1 hour

Original release
- Network: ABC
- Release: August 15 – September 12, 2007

NASCAR in Primetime is a Television documentary on ABC News. It is a behind-the-scenes look at the preparation, logistics, drama and competition of NASCAR and marks the first-time that NASCAR had surrendered editorial control in a production that it cooperated in. It aired five episodes, totaling about 4 to 6 hours, from summer to early fall of 2007.

Each episode of the show follows teams and drivers during the '07 NASCAR season, such as Mark Martin and Juan Pablo Montoya.

The show premiered 15 August 2007, at 10 p.m. Eastern/Pacific Time and 9 p.m. Central/Mountain Time.

== Production ==
=== Conception and filming ===
Two years prior to release, Michael Bicks, the executive producer of the series, approached Sarah Nettinga, managing director of film, television, and entertainment for NASCAR, about the idea of a NASCAR documentary series. Later, NASCAR and ABC News entered into a production consulting deal, said to help license race footage and reduce production costs.

Filming began in March 2007 at Las Vegas Motor Speedway and also filmed in various other locations, such as the Atlanta Motor Speedway.

=== Production team ===
The series was produced by ABC News. Rudy Bednar was the senior executive producer, and Michael Bicks was the executive producer. George Kachadorian was the supervising editor and producer. Samantha Chapman and Bryan Taylor were producers.

== See also ==
- NASCAR on ESPN
