= Speed (TV network) =

Satellite television channel dedicated to motorsports

- Logo used as Speed from 2002 to 2013
- Country: United States
- Broadcast area: United States; Australia; Brazil; Caribbean; Puerto Rico; Latin America
- Headquarters: Charlotte, North Carolina, U.S.

Programming
- Languages: English; Spanish; Portuguese
- Picture format: 720p (HDTV); 480i (SDTV/16:9 letterbox)

Ownership
- Owner: Original: 21st Century Fox; Revival: Boss One Media, LLC; Robert Scanlon

History
- Launched: December 31, 1995; 30 years ago (original iteration); November 17, 2022; 4 years ago (revival)
- Closed: August 17, 2013; 13 years ago (original iteration)
- Replaced by: Fox Sports 1 (United States); Fox Sports Racing (Canada); Fox Sports 3 (Latin America); Fox Sports 5 (Australia/Puerto Rico)
- Former names: Speedvision (1995–2002); Speed Channel (2002–2005)

Links
- Website: foxsports.com/motorsports

Speed is an American FAST platform and a former sports-oriented cable and satellite television network owned by the Fox Sports Media Group division of 21st Century Fox. The network was dedicated to motorsports programming, including auto racing, as well as automotive-focused programs.

Although the channel was based in the United States (its headquarters were located at University Research Park in Charlotte, North Carolina), Speed ceased being available to most American viewers as a standalone network with its own original programming on August 17, 2013, when it was replaced by the general-interest sports network Fox Sports 1. An "international" version of the network, now known as Fox Sports Racing, concurrently launched in Canada, the Caribbean and the U.S. territory of Puerto Rico to replace the domestic feed, airing archived Speed programming and live simulcasts of motorsports events carried by Fox Sports 1 and Fox Sports 2 in the United States that would be otherwise unavailable to international viewers.

When it originally launched in 1995 as Speedvision, the network carried a lineup featuring programs profiling the automobile and motorsports industries (including individual companies, vehicles and teams), how-to series, and coverage of various domestic and international racing series (such as the Formula One World Championship, Rolex Sports Car Series, and the American Le Mans Series). After it was acquired by News Corporation in 2001 and relaunched as Speed Channel, the network's programming became increasingly NASCAR-oriented; prior to its shutdown in the United States, Speed's lineup consisted mostly of automotive-themed reality shows, NASCAR-related programs (including coverage of practice and qualifying sessions, and full coverage of the Truck Series and NASCAR-owned Rolex Sports Car Series), along with news programs focusing on motorsports. Most of Speed's live event programming was carried over to Fox Sports 1 (or sister network Fox Sports 2) and was simulcasted on the Speed network that remained available outside the United States.

Due to contractual changes associated with the relaunch, Fox was expected to temporarily distribute a version of Speed (separate from the international version) to fulfill contracts with providers that had not yet signed deals to carry Fox Sports 1, airing a loop of the network's past reality programming. Many of the programs once found on Speed can now be found in the United States on CBS Sports Network, MAVTV and Velocity (such as Gearz, My Classic Car, Chop Cut Rebuild, and Dream Car Garage as well as live coverage of racing events), others not such as Speed Center.

Nine years after the closure of Speed, the channel was revived in November 2022 under its original Speedvision name as a FAST supported channel while the post-2001 Speed was also relaunched that same year by Boss One Media, LLC as a YouTube channel, then changed under the name PowerTube TV. In February 2026, the Speed brand was brought back as a motorsports podcast hosted by ex-NASCAR star Kevin Harvick and Indycar lead commentator Will Buxton.

== History ==
=== As Speedvision ===
The network originally launched as Speedvision on December 31, 1995. The network was one of two (the other being the Outdoor Life Network) formed out of a partnership of Cox Cable and Times Mirror which had combined their cable systems operations in 1994. In July 1995, Times Mirror decided to reassess its media holdings and reduced its stake in the two planned networks to 10%. Comcast and Continental Cablevision were brought on as new partners.

Speedvision was planned by former ESPN executive Roger L. Werner, E. Roger Williams and Robert Scanlon. The network offered a mix of automotive, boating, and aviation programming.

Speedvision's initial lineup featured various automotive programs, including various documentary-style series focusing on prolific vehicles, manufacturers, and racing teams (such as Victory by Design and Legends of Motorsport), series focusing on classic automobiles (such as Dream Car Garage, coverage of Barrett-Jackson's auctions, and My Classic Car, which moved to the network from TNN), an AutoWeek-branded television series, along with MotorWeek and Autoline Detroit – two programs respectively syndicated from PBS member stations in Maryland and Detroit. Speedvision also carried coverage of various minor and professional auto racing series, including the Sports Car Club of America's World Challenge series (of which it also acquired title sponsorship of in 1999, becoming the Speedvision World Challenge), American Le Mans Series, NASCAR Winston West Series, ARCA Racing Series, Formula One, and the Pep Boys Indy Racing League.

=== Fox acquisition and NASCAR push ===
In 1998, the Fox Entertainment Group (then a subsidiary of News Corporation) purchased a 30% ownership interest in Speedvision. In May 2001, Fox negotiated a deal to acquire the stakes held by Cox and Comcast, thus giving them majority control of the network. Since Fox Sports had recently acquired broadcast rights to the first half of the NASCAR Busch and Winston Cup Series in a six-year deal, Fox planned to leverage Speedvision as an outlet for supplemental NASCAR programming. To coincide with that year's running of the Daytona 500, Speedvision was relaunched as Speed Channel on February 11, 2002; the network's operations were also relocated from Stamford, Connecticut to Charlotte, North Carolina (where NASCAR and the majority of its teams are based).

In the following years, additional NASCAR-related programs were slowly brought on to the schedule, ranging from news programs (such as Totally NASCAR, rerun from Fox Sports Net, and NASCAR Race Hub), pre-race programs Trackside and NASCAR RaceDay, and the post-race NASCAR Victory Lane. Speed Channel also added a weekly call-in show in 2003, WindTunnel with Dave Despain, which featured interviews and discussions relating to news and events in auto racing.

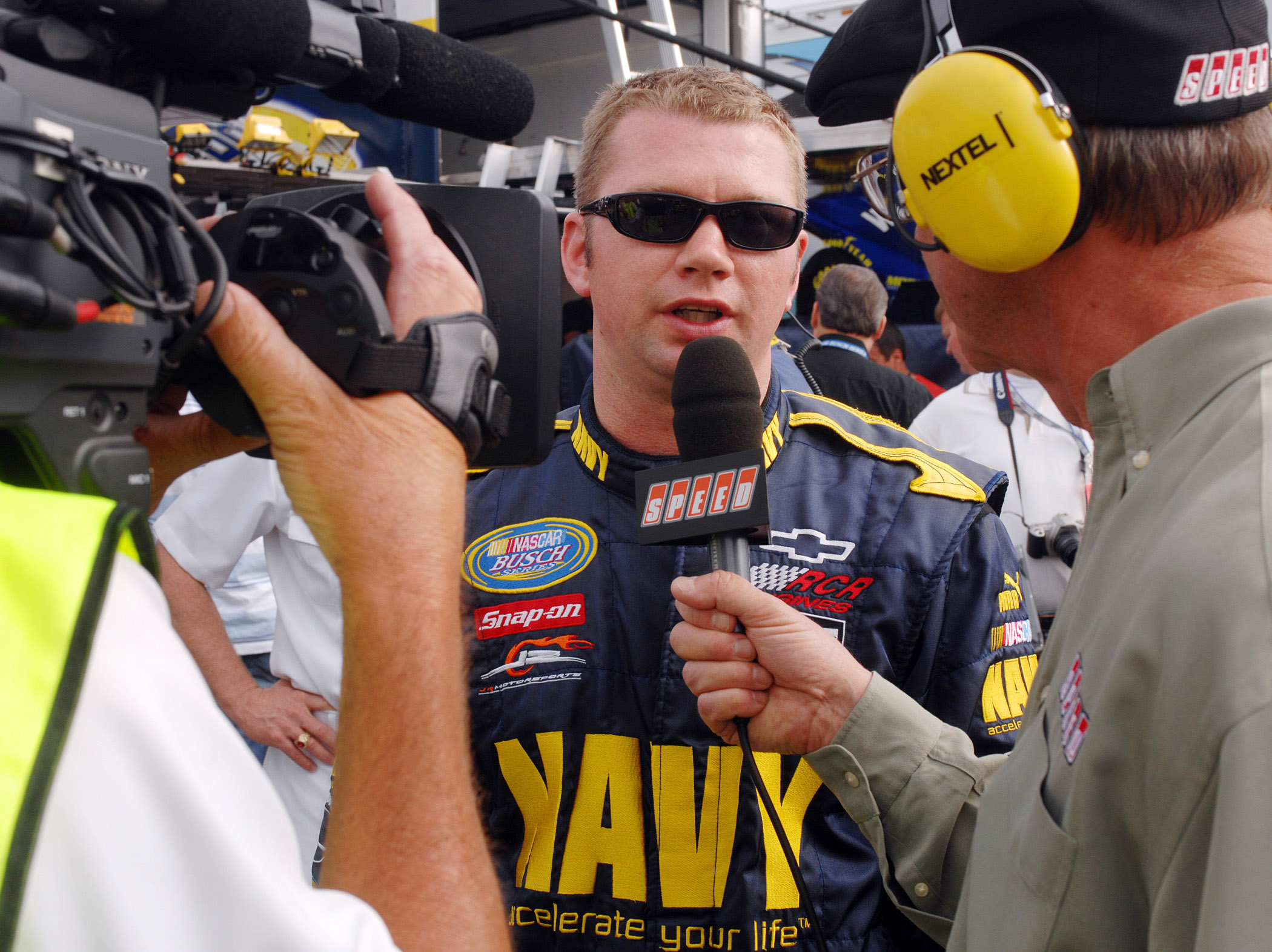
NASCAR Busch (now Xfinity) Series driver Shane Huffman answers questions from Speed Channel's Dick Berggren.

Starting in 2003, Speed began to carry NASCAR's Truck Series, after buying out the remainder of ESPN2's contract for the events. The channel also offered coverage of practices and qualifying races in NASCAR's main national series, the Gatorade Duels qualifying races, and the Sprint All-Star Race. In 2005, the channel's name was shortened to simply Speed.

In 2006, the conclusion of Daytona 500 qualifying coverage was moved to Speed due to NBC's coverage of the 2006 Olympic Winter Games. The coverage still had NBC graphics and commentary. It would be the only time that the NBC/TNT broadcast combo (which aired the Daytona 500 in even-numbered years and the summer race in the odd-numbered months) would air its NASCAR coverage on SPEED.

Until late 2007, Speed also aired coverage of International Bobsleigh & Skeleton Federation events over the winter months – including bobsledding, luge and skeleton. Its winter sports coverage also included an annual charity bobsledding event organized by NASCAR driver and bobsled builder Geoff Bodine, which featured participation by various NASCAR drivers. Universal Sports acquired the rights to FIBT events beginning in the 2007–08 season.

Speed continued to maintain coverage of other professional racing series, such as the Rolex Sports Car Series (including the 24 Hours of Daytona), the American Le Mans Series (along with the 24 Hours of Le Mans), the newly renamed Speed World Challenge until 2010, and the Formula One World Championship. By the mid 2000s, these came along with an increasing number of reality series (such as the street racing-inspired Pinks, Unique Whips, Chop Cut Rebuild, the drag racing game show Pass Time, American Trucker, and Hard Parts: South Bronx, along with reruns of the MTV series Pimp My Ride). By 2008, Speed was carried in over 73 million households.

In 2010, Fox launched Speed 2, a TV Everywhere video streaming service which featured coverage of additional racing series not broadcast by Speed, along with video on demand access to archived Speed programs. The service was shut down in 2014.

In 2011, Speed began carrying Australia's V8 Supercars series; it also aired live coverage of the Gold Coast 600 (where major international drivers competed in teams alongside Australian drivers) and the Bathurst 1000 featuring Darrell Waltrip, Mike Joy, Leigh Diffey, and Calvin Fish on-location. The move was met with praise from series organizers, who felt that the series could benefit from the additional exposure it would receive from American coverage—the series would also add a U.S. event at Austin's Circuit of the Americas for the 2013 season.

On October 12, 2012, Fox Sports announced that it would not renew its contract to air Formula One racing on Speed after the conclusion of the 2012 season. Two days later, NBC Sports announced that it had reached a new four-year deal to broadcast F1 races beginning in the 2013 season, with the majority of its coverage to be carried by NBC Sports Network. Three days later, Fox Sports reached an agreement with NASCAR to extend the network's broadcasting contract through the 2022 season (maintaining its rights to the first half of the Cup Series and the full NASCAR Truck Series), along with the addition of online streaming rights beginning in 2013.

=== International expansion ===
Speed became available in Canada shortly after its U.S. launch. As Speedvision, Speed was approved by the Canadian Radio-television and Telecommunications Commission (CRTC) to be added to its list of foreign cable networks approved for carriage on Canadian cable and satellite providers in 1997. As such, Speed was carried by most Canadian television service providers. Prior to August 2013, Canadian viewers saw a largely identical schedule as the U.S. channel, although some programming, particularly live Formula 1 events, were blacked out to protect TSN, which holds domestic broadcast rights to F1 events (under CRTC rules, foreign services must own Canadian broadcast rights to the content they air). However, this point became moot when NBC Sports Network obtained rights to F1 events beginning with the 2013 season, as that network is not available in Canada.

The Latin American version of Speed was launched on November 5, 2005 with a Brazilian version following in July 2006, carrying live coverage of the NASCAR Cup, Nationwide Series, and Truck Series, Rolex Sports Car Series, American Le Mans Series (including 24 Hours of Le Mans), and the Deutsche Tourenwagen Masters. It also aired delayed coverage of the World Series by Renault and NASCAR Mexico. Other programming included highlights shows including British Formula Three Championship, the Argentine TC 2000 and Turismo Carretera, and the Colombian T.C. 2000 and delayed highlights of Australia's V8 Supercars, FIA GT (airing on a few months delay), AMA Supercross and Monster Jam, as well as non-motorsport programs such as Grand Prix on Track, Grand Prix Story, Unique Whips, Tuner Mania and Pinks.

Speed launched in Australia on November 1, 2010 on Foxtel in both standard and high definition. After months of negotiations and controversy, on March 25, 2011, Speed and Speed HD launched on subscription television provider Austar. Among other racing events, the Australian network aired NASCAR Cup, Nationwide and Truck Series, V8 Supercars and Superbike World Championship with the network also having its own version of Speed News. Unlike the U.S. version, it was owned by Fox Sports Pty Limited, a subsidiary of News Corp Australia – which no longer was directly connected to 21st Century Fox due to its inclusion in the split of News Corporation.

On February 5, 2012, the Latin American channel was replaced in Brazil by a domestic version of Fox Sports. Beginning in 2012, the network broadcast Formula 1 free practices and live and delayed qualifying events and races, as well as live races from the GP2 Series and GP3 Series. On November 5, 2012, Speed Latin America was relaunched as Fox Sports 3, whose programming remained focused on motorsports the following years.

On November 2, 2014, the Australian version of Speed closed and was replaced by Fox Sports 5.

=== Shutdown of Speed and relaunch as Fox Sports 1, 2 and Fox Sports Racing ===
On March 5, 2013, Fox Sports announced that Speed would be shut down and replaced by a new mainstream sports channel known as Fox Sports 1; the network was to inherit Speed's NASCAR coverage (which would be expanded under a new television deal in 2015 to add coverage of selected Sprint Cup Series and Nationwide Series events), but joined by new or recently acquired sports rights, including college basketball and football, Major League Soccer, UFC, and new studio programming. Sister channel Fuel TV was also being re-launched as a companion, Fox Sports 2.

The last program to be broadcast by Speed in the United States was a replay of qualifying for that weekend's Sprint Cup event, the Pure Michigan 400, which was soon followed by a statement from Fox NASCAR play-by-play announcer Mike Joy marking the end of Speed's operations in the United States:

For 18 years, it's been our honor and privilege to present motorsports and automotive-related programming to you on the network that began as Speedvision, became Speed Channel, and is now known as Speed. From the visionaries who started this network, from maintenance to management, from the talent to the truck drivers, we've shared your passion for motorsports over lo these many years. We love that you care as much about your cars as family, God and country, and so do we. But now, it's time to switch off the ignition and turn in the keys. This is the end of Speed in America. We hope you'll follow us on our new journey to Fox Sports 1 because all your favorite live NASCAR programming and much more is coming along with us. So now, it's goodnight and farewell to America's motorsports authority, Speed.

— Fox's Mike Joy, at the moment Speed was relaunched as Fox Sports 1

Although Fox marketed the transition to Fox Sports 1 as a re-launch of Speed, Fox was required to re-negotiate carriage deals with providers for Fox Sports 1 due to the change of its nature of service. There was uncertainty over whether Fox Sports 1 would have sufficient carriage at launch, as it had not yet reached deals with three of the four largest pay television providers in the United States (these being DirecTV, Dish Network and Time Warner Cable) with only a month before its launch. However, all three finally agreed to terms to carry Fox Sports 1 three days before the scheduled launch. For any remaining television providers that did not reach a deal, Fox offered a "watered-down" version of Speed (which consisted of a loop of the network's reality programming and no live events) to fulfill existing carriage contracts until they reached a deal to carry Fox Sports 1. In international markets such as Canada, a Speed-branded service was maintained running an automated loop of Speed's previous non-event programming, and simulcasts of motorsports programming carried by Fox Sports 1 or 2.

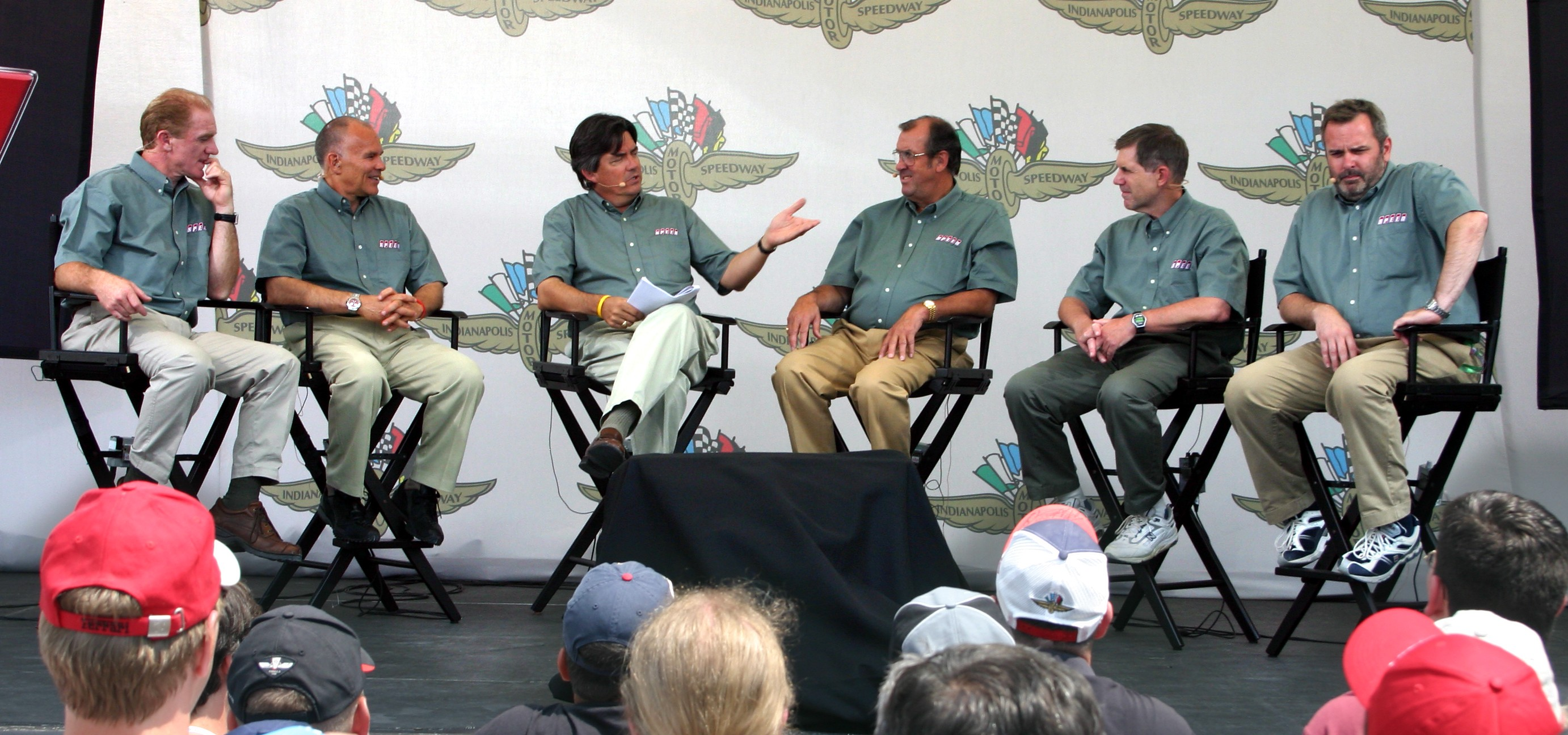
Speed's former Formula One commentators record a panel discussion at the 2006 United States Grand Prix at Indianapolis Motor Speedway (left to right – Derek Daly, Peter Windsor, Bob Varsha, David Hobbs, Sam Posey, Steve Matchett).

Despite the channel’s shutdown, the Speed brand would be briefly used on Fox Sports’ social media platforms for coverage of AMA Supercross, the NHRA Mello Yello Drag Racing Series, the ARCA Racing Series, IMSA, and other non-NASCAR motorsports. Some of these Speed-branded accounts were later converted for IndyCar Series on Fox use.

In Canada, as well as the Caribbean and Puerto Rico, Speed was not converted to Fox Sports 1 with the exact reasons for this not being confirmed, although in the case of Canada, it was not clear whether Fox would have had the ability to make such a change given that Speed's Canadian authorization was based on it being a motorsports-based network with that version of Speed still being available in these areas despite its U.S. shutdown. It would continue to carry various NASCAR and other motorsports events, as well as related studio programming, mostly simulcast with their U.S. broadcasts on Fox Sports 1 or Fox Sports 2, but did not otherwise originate any new programming of its own. During hours when the network was not simulcasting FS1 or FS2 coverage, it carried repeats of past events and Speed's previous reality and documentary programming without carrying commercial advertising: commercial breaks consist solely of promos for its programming, with no outside advertising aside from public service announcements and promotions inserted by local providers.

In early 2014, major Canadian service providers including Rogers Cable and Bell Satellite TV began to drop the service upon the expiration of their carriage contracts. Cogeco dropped the Speed Channel on July 15, 2014. Shaw later announced they would drop Speed on April 1, 2015 within their cable and satellite system (a.k.a. Shaw Cable and Shaw Direct). Reports indicate that Fox had attempted to raise the channel's carriage fees significantly, despite the major reductions in original programming for international viewers, and Rogers suggests Fox was unwilling to allow Speed to be moved to a more specialized package in light of the programming and cost changes.

On February 19, 2015, Fox announced that the international feed of Speed would be re-branded as Fox Sports Racing, and announced that Rogers had reached a deal to add the rebranded network back to its lineup.

=== Streaming and podcast revivals ===
On October 12, 2022, it was announced that Speed co-founder Robert Scanlon was collaborating with Rick Hendrick, Bill Goldberg and advertising industry sales executive Joe Abruzzese to revive the Speedvision brand as a linear channel on FAST (free ad-supported television) services. In addition to the relaunch, Boss One Media, LLC, a company owned by Brian Bossone, had also acquired the Speed intellectual property, social media handles, and the website domain from Fox Corporation, the successor company to 21st Century Fox whose assets were sold to The Walt Disney Company in 2019.

The Scanlon-led channel was relaunched on November 17, 2022 and features original and archival automotive programming on its daily schedule while the Bossone-led version is also streaming on YouTube, Then the channel has been transitioned to PowerTube TV. On February 15, 2026, Fox announced that the Speed name and branding would be used for a motorsports podcast hosted by Kevin Harvick and Will Buxton to begin on February 23.

== Programming ==
=== Speed on Fox ===
Speed on Fox was the name given for any motorsports events shown on Fox which would normally be broadcast by Speed Channel. The events included races from the NASCAR Truck Series (using NASCAR on Fox branding and graphics when aired), Formula One, and Rolex Sports Car Series. The name was first used in February 2007. Formula One was broadcast on Fox for six years and the Truck Series for eight years.

=== Magazines ===
- Autospeed
- Battle of the Supercars
- The Car Show (Australia)
- Car Warriors
- Dumbest Stuff on Wheels
- GP Racing
- Grand Prix on Track (Latin America)
- Grand Prix Story (Latin America)
- Unique Whips (Latin America)
- Tuner Mania (Latin America)
- Motorsport Mundial
- My Ride Rules
- Velocidad Sur (Latin America)
- SPEED Center
- Speedmakers

== Notable personalities ==
- Adam Alexander – NASCAR Race Hub host, now at NASCAR on Prime Video and TNT as lead lap-by-lap
- Allen Bestwick – NASCAR Winston West and American Le Mans Series commentator, now at Racing America and the Trans-Am Series
- Will Buxton – Formula One pit road reporter, now at Fox IndyCar as lead play-by-play and on Speed podcast with co-host Kevin Harvick
- Wally Dallenbach Jr. – former driver and NASCAR Race Hub analyst
- Dave Despain – host of WindTunnel with Dave Despain, now at MavTV hosting The Dave Despain Show
- Leigh Diffey – Grand-Am/IMSA host and commentator, now at NBC Sports
- Bob Dillner – NASCAR reporter
- Ray Dunlap – contract not renewed for 2017
- Jeff Gordon – longtime driver and former NASCAR on Fox color commentator; now in executive role at Hendrick Motorsports
- Jeff Hammond – NASCAR Race Hub analyst and NASCAR on Fox pre-race show co-host
- David Hobbs – Formula One commentator
- Mike Joy – lead lap by lap for NASCAR on Fox since 2001
- Jamie Little – current NASCAR on Fox pit reporter
- Steve Matchett – Formula One commentator
- Larry McReynolds – NASCAR Race Hub analyst
- Phil Parsons – NASCAR Truck Series studio analyst and ARCA Racing Series and NASCAR Truck Series color commentator
- Kyle Petty – now at NASCAR on NBC
- Rick Allen – NASCAR Truck Series, ARCA Racing Series, and NASCAR K&N Pro Series commentator
- John Roberts – NASCAR RaceDay host, NASCAR Setup pre-race show host
- Hermie Sadler – NASCAR Truck Series pit reporter
- Danielle Trotta – NASCAR Race Hub host, now at Prime NASCAR as pre and post-race host
- Bob Varsha – Formula One and Grand-Am host and commentator
- Kaitlyn Vincie – NASCAR Truck Series studio host, now on Kevin Harvick's Happy Hour podcast as a co-host and on Speed podcast as a co-host due to the absence of either Harvick or Buxton
- Krista Voda – host of NASCAR Trackside and NASCAR Truck Series pre-shows, later at NASCAR on NBC
- Wendy Venturini – NASCAR RaceDay analyst
- Kenny Wallace – NASCAR RaceDay analyst
- Darrell Waltrip – former longtime NASCAR on Fox color commentator
- Michael Waltrip – NASCAR Truck Series color commentator
- Peter Windsor – Formula One on-location reporter
- Rutledge Wood – later on Top Gear and NASCAR on NBC
- Matt Yocum – current longtime NASCAR on Fox pit reporter

== See also ==
- Fox Sports (United States)
