= Jimmy Spencer =

American racing driver (born 1957)

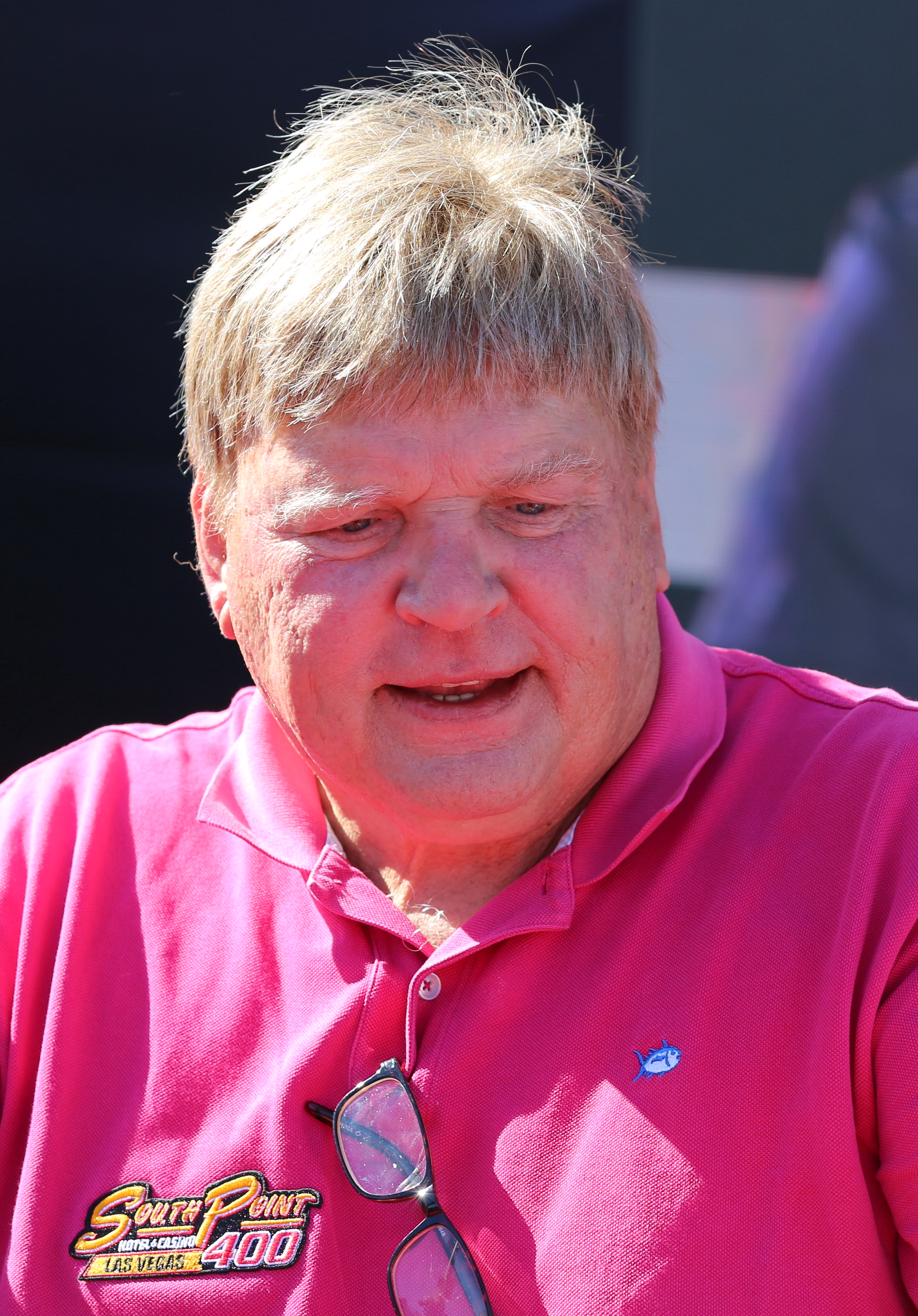
- Spencer at Las Vegas Motor Speedway in 2025
- Born: February 15, 1957 (age 69); Berwick, Pennsylvania, U.S.
- Achievements: 1986, 1987 NASCAR Featherlite Modified Series Champion; 1985 World Series of Asphalt Tour-Type Modified Champion; 1982, 1983 Shangri-La Speedway NASCAR Winston Racing Series Track Champion; 1984 Spring Sizzler Winner; 1983 Race of Champions Winner
- Awards: Named ninth on NASCAR's all-time Top 10 Modified Drivers; 1979 Shangri-La Speedway NASCAR Modified Division Rookie of the Year

NASCAR Cup Series career
- 478 races run over 18 years
- Best finish: 12th (1993)
- First race: 1989 Budweiser 500 (Dover)
- Last race: 2006 Pennsylvania 500 (Pocono)
- First win: 1994 Pepsi 400 (Daytona)
- Last win: 1994 DieHard 500 (Talladega)
Wins	Top tens	Poles
2	80	3

NASCAR O'Reilly Auto Parts Series career
- 212 races run over 20 years
- Best finish: 7th (1988)
- First race: 1985 Sandhills 200 (Rockingham)
- Last race: 2005 Aaron's 312 (Atlanta)
- First win: 1989 Mountain Dew 400 (Hickory)
- Last win: 2002 Food City 250 (Bristol)
Wins	Top tens	Poles
12	93	3

NASCAR FedEx Freight Truck Series career
- 31 races run over 3 years
- Best finish: 12th (2005)
- First race: 2003 Virginia Is For Lovers 200 (Richmond)
- Last race: 2005 Ford 200 (Homestead)
- First win: 2003 New Hampshire 200 (New Hampshire)
Wins	Top tens	Poles
1	11	1

James Peter Spencer (born February 15, 1957) is an American former racing driver, team owner, talk show host and television commentator. He is best known for competing in NASCAR. He hosted the NASCAR-inspired talk show, What's the Deal?, on Speed, and was co-host, with John Roberts and Kenny Wallace, of Speed's pre-race and post-race NASCAR shows NASCAR RaceDay and NASCAR Victory Lane. Before retiring, Spencer had a segment on Speed's NASCAR Race Hub offering commentary and answering viewer questions (on Tuesdays and Thursdays). During his days racing modifieds, he was nicknamed "Mr. Excitement" for his aggressive racing style. Spencer is one of the few drivers to have won a race in all three of NASCAR's top series: the NASCAR Cup Series, the O'Reilly Series, and the Truck Series.

Spencer's Cup wins both came in summer 1994 at the restrictor plate races at Daytona and Talladega.

== Racing career ==
=== Early years ===
Spencer followed his father, Ed Spencer Sr., commonly known as "Fast Eddie", in racing. Spencer started driving Late Models in Pennsylvania. He captured his first win in the Late Model division at Port Royal Speedway in 1976. He moved to NASCAR Modifieds at Shangri-La Speedway (Owego, New York), then branched out to bigger events throughout the Northeast. In 1984, Spencer was one of the top contenders for NASCAR's National Modified Championship, at a time when all sanctioned races counted toward that title; after running over 60 races, he was second to Richie Evans in the final standings. When NASCAR changed the National Modified Championship into the smaller-schedule Winston Modified Tour (now the Whelen Modified Tour) in 1985, Spencer continued to run, and won the title in 1986 and 1987.

Spencer debuted in the Busch Series in 1985, finishing 19th at North Carolina Motor Speedway in the No. 67 Pontiac for Frank Cicci Racing, which was also his Modified team. The team ran twice in 1987 with a best-finish 36th, then ran the full season in 1988, finishing seventh in the point standings with five top-fives and 13 top-tens in the No. 34. In 1989, Spencer won his first career Busch race, the Mountain Dew 400 at Hickory Motor Speedway. Spencer later won another two that season at Orange County and Myrtle Beach, finishing 15th in the final standings.

=== 1989–1994 ===
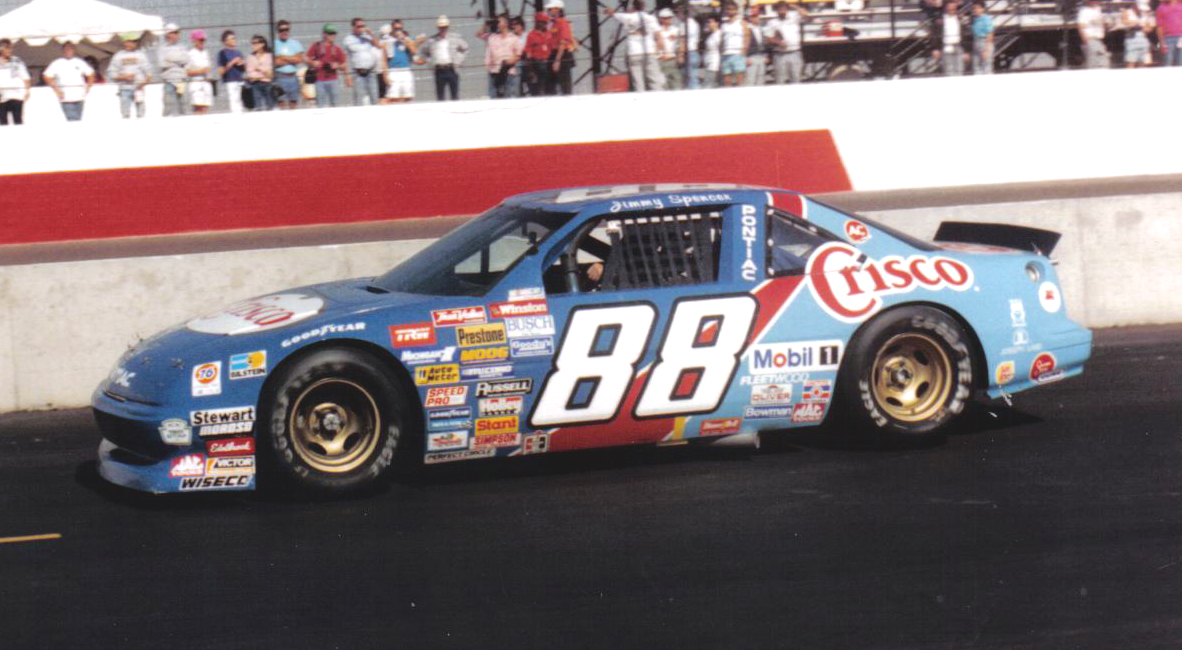
Spencer's No. 88 race car in 1989.

In 1989, Spencer moved to the Winston Cup Series, driving the No. 88 Crisco Pontiac for Buddy Baker's team in seventeen of the 29 races. He posted three top-tens and finished 34th in points. He then ran full-time in 1990, finishing in the top-ten twice for Rod Osterlund Racing in the No. 57 Heinz Pontiac and finished 24th in points. In 1991, Spencer moved to the No. 98 Banquet Foods Chevrolet for Travis Carter Motorsports. Despite six top-ten finishes, Spencer dropped one position in the standings due to 12 DNFs. He began 1992 with Carter, but moved down to the Busch Series to drive the No. 20 Daily's 1st Ade Oldsmobile for Dick Moroso after Carter's team folded early in the season. He responded with his second career wins at both Myrtle Beach Speedway and Orange County Speedway.

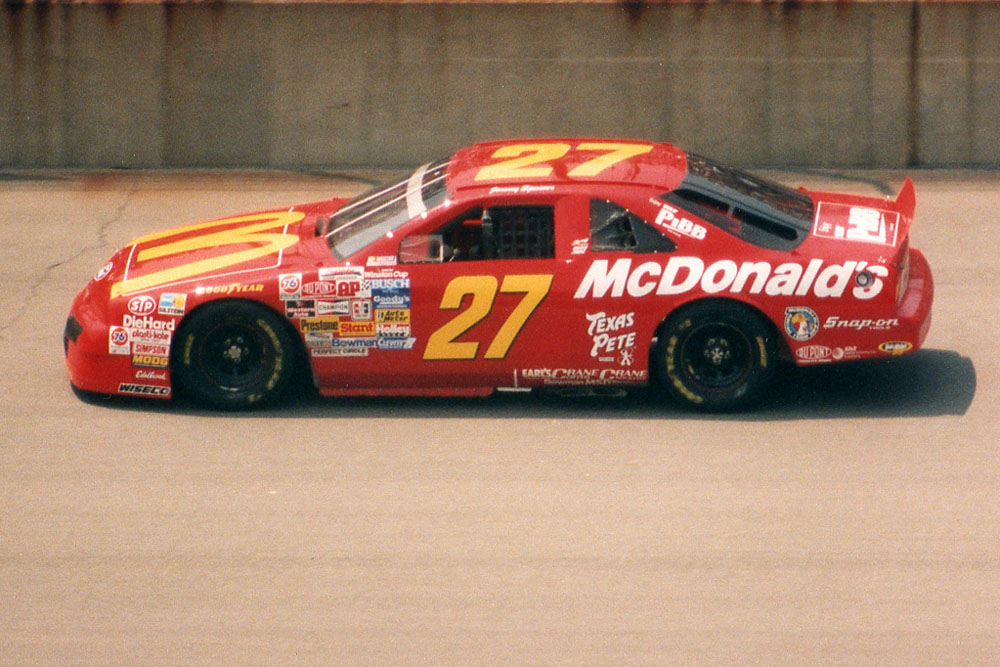
Spencer's race car in 1994.

Late in the 1992 season, Spencer joined Bobby Allison Motorsports' Cup team and posted three top-fives in the last four races of the season. He signed to drive Allison's No. 12 Meineke Ford Thunderbird full-time in 1993, and finished in the top-five five times, resulting in a career-best 12th place in the final standings. In 1994, he drove the No. 27 McDonald's Ford for Junior Johnson and won his first two and only career Cup races, the Pepsi 400 at Daytona, and the DieHard 500 at Talladega. On the final lap at Daytona, Spencer won his first career Cup race passing Ernie Irvan for his only scored lap lead. He also won his first career pole award for the Tyson Holly Farms 400 at North Wilkesboro Speedway. Other than that, the season was a huge disappointment, as he would only score two further top-ten finishes and finished the season 29th in the standings.

=== 1995–2001 ===
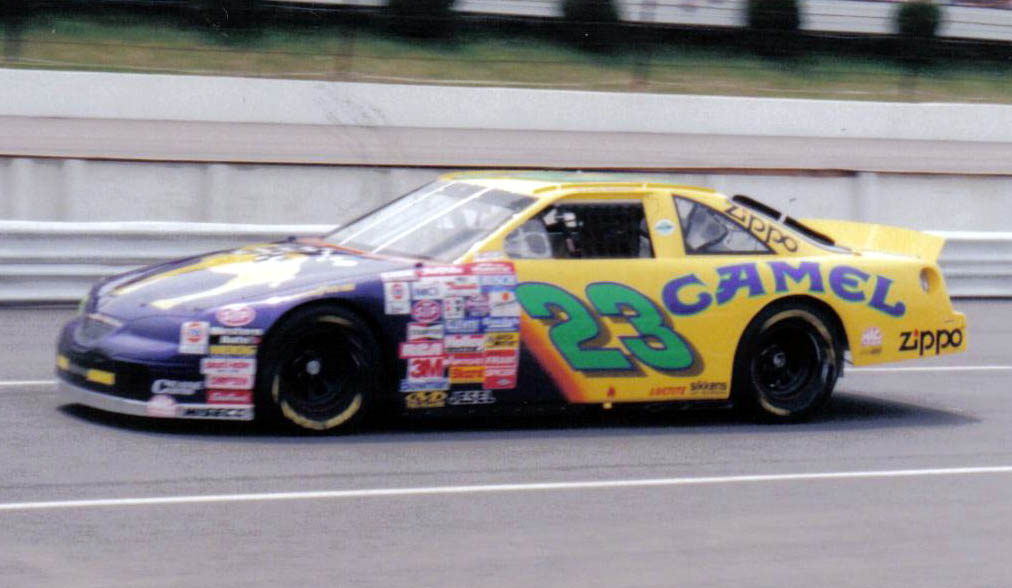
Spencer's 1997 Camel Ford

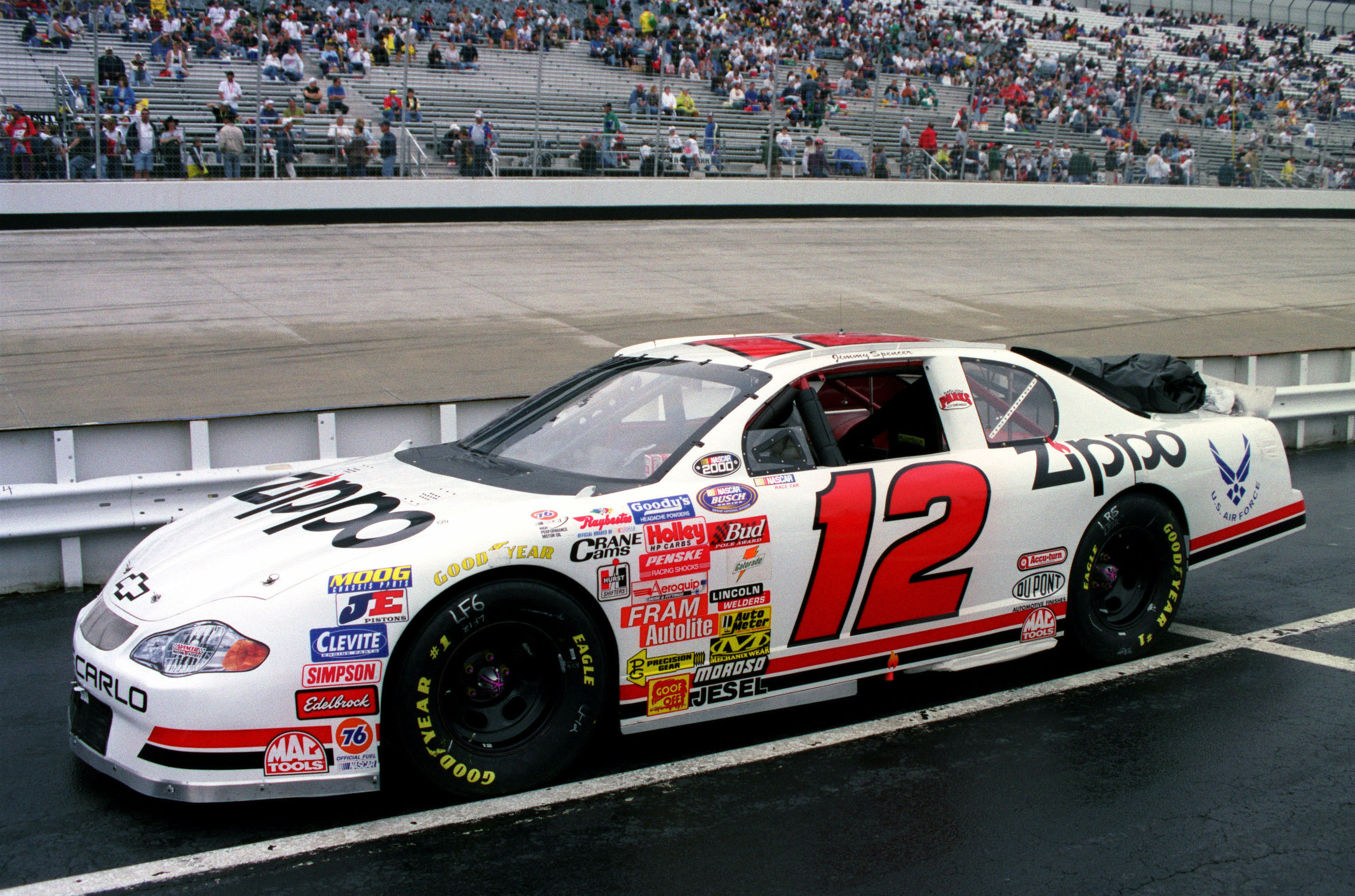
Spencer's Busch Series car at Dover in 2000

After finishing 29th in the standings in 1994, Spencer left to reunite with Travis Carter, who was then fielding the No. 23 Smokin' Joe's Ford. He finished in the top-ten four times in 1995 and in 1996, Spencer had two top-fives en route to a 15th-place finish in points. He fell to 20th in 1997.

In 1998, Winston/No Bull became his team's new primary sponsor and he was 11th in points when he suffered injuries at the Brickyard 400, forcing him to sit out the next two races to recover and fall to 14th in points. During the season, Spencer formed his own NASCAR team, Spencer Motor Ventures, which fielded the No. 12 Zippo Chevrolet Monte Carlo in the Busch Series for himself and Boris Said, Steve Grissom, and Rick Mast. The team expanded to two cars in 1999, fielding the No. 12 and the No. 5 Schneider National Chevy for Dick Trickle. In 2000, he moved his team up to Cup to run the road course races with Boris Said in the No. 23 Federated Auto Parts Ford Taurus. The team ceased operations at the end of the season.

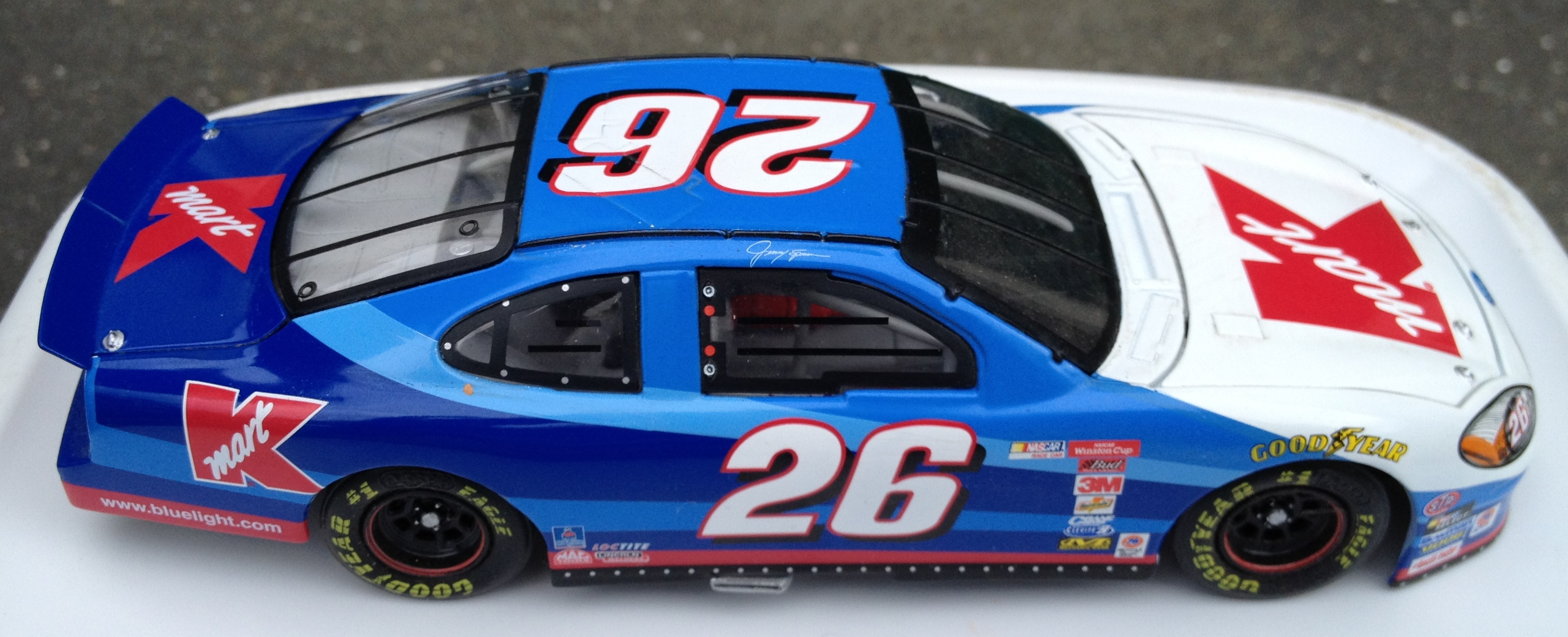
A diecast car of Spencer's 2001 Cup Series car

After a 20th-place finish in 1999, Winston left the team, and Kmart became the team's new sponsor, causing Spencer to switch to the No. 26 to accommodate the new sponsor, who was already backing the No. 66 car driven by Spencer's teammate, Darrell Waltrip. Spencer had two top-fives and in 2001 won the pole positions at Indianapolis Motor Speedway and Lowe's Motor Speedway and advanced to 16th in points.

=== 2002–2004 ===
For the 2002 season, Spencer would join Chip Ganassi Racing and drive the No. 41 Target Dodge Intrepid. He began the season by failing to qualify for the Daytona 500, then had a streak of four top-five qualifying efforts, including at Bristol Motor Speedway, where he started fourth and was leading the race when he was bumped by Kurt Busch to win, starting a long rivalry between the two. After another DNQ at Watkins Glen International, Spencer was released from the ride at the end of the season, causing him to file a lawsuit against the Ganassi organization, saying his dismissal was a violation of his contract. Also in 2002, Spencer won his last career Busch Series race, the Food City 250 at Bristol driving for Phoenix Racing.

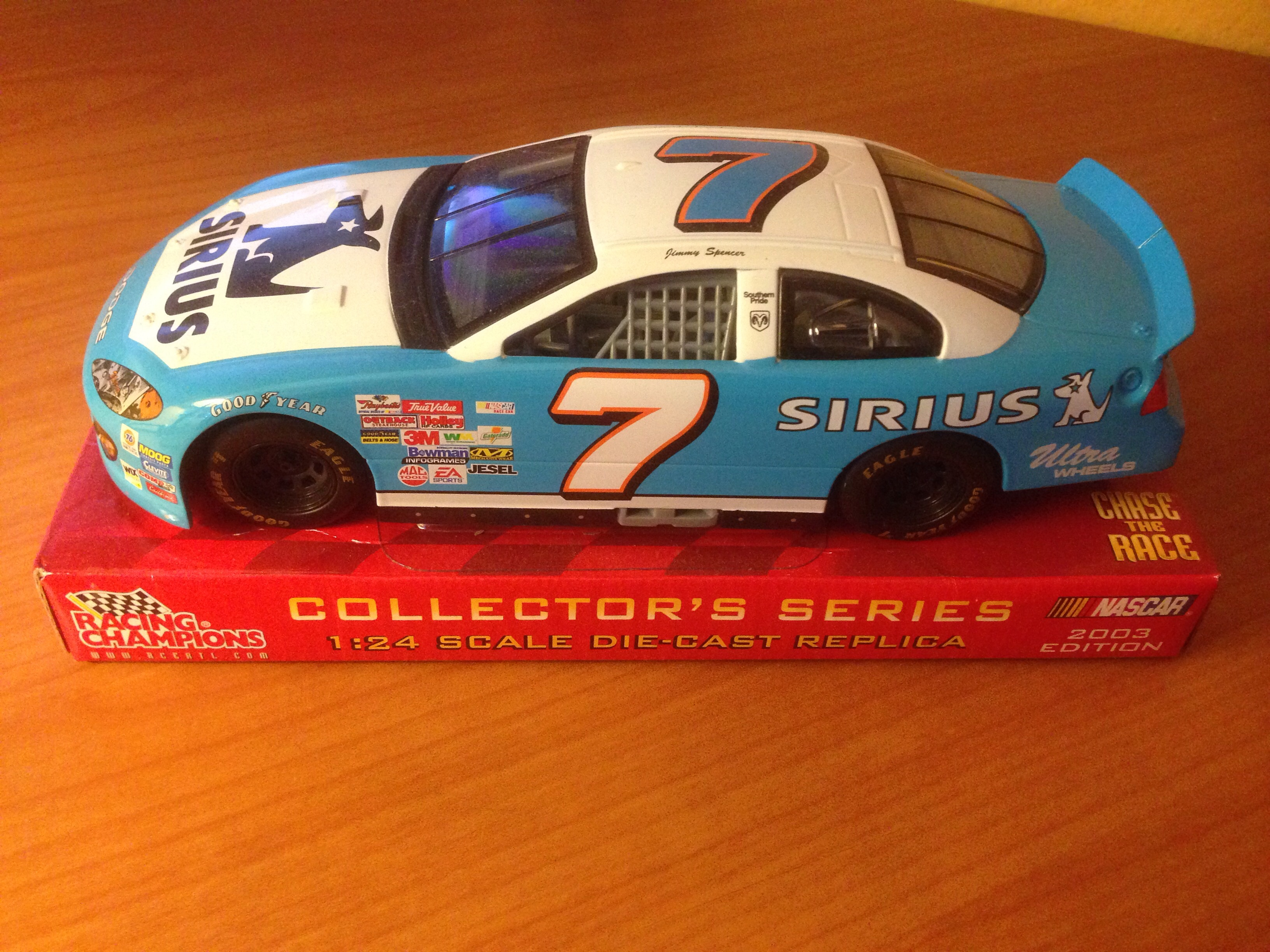
A diecast car of Spencer's 2003 Cup Series car

Spencer joined Ultra Motorsports in 2003, piloting the No. 7 Sirius Satellite Radio Dodge. After some on-track incidents with Kurt Busch, Spencer confronted Busch after the GFS Marketplace 400 while Busch was still in his car. He was suspended for next week's race, the Sharpie 500 at Bristol Motor Speedway while Busch was placed on probation. Despite the events that took place at Michigan, he had four top-tens and ended the season 29th in points. He was also hired to drive three races for the No. 2 Team ASE Racing Dodge Ram for Ultra's Truck Series team, winning the pole and the race in his second start at New Hampshire Motor Speedway. He became a part-owner of the Cicci organization that season, when he put Stuart Kirby in Cicci's No. 34 United States Air Force Chevy, but that partnership soon dissolved. He continued to remain involved as a part-owner, when he leased his shop to Bang! Racing in the Craftsman Truck Series in 2004.

Spencer began 2004 with Ultra's Cup team at the Daytona 500, but when the team closed down due to a lack of sponsorship, he replaced Kevin Lepage at Morgan-McClure Motorsports, which had also been running unsponsored. Spencer's best finish that season had been seventeenth at Dover after gaining sponsors in Featherlite Trailers and Lucas Oil, when on October 25, he was arrested after trying to interfere with the police, who had a warrant to arrest his son for vandalism. The incident cost Spencer his job at Morgan-McClure, and he sat out the rest of 2004.

=== 2005–2013 ===
Spencer returned to the No. 2 Ultra truck in 2005. While he failed to win a race, he had nine top-ten finishes and finished 12th in points. He came close to a victory, however, in the season opener at Daytona. He held the lead late in the race and held off 2004 series champion Bobby Hamilton until just before the caution came out on the last lap. Assuming he was in the lead when NASCAR froze the field, he completed the caution lap then pulled into victory lane, only to be told by an official that, in fact, he had finished second. He also ran part-time in Cup, running nine races in the No. 50 Arnold Motorsports Dodge, and one race apiece for Peak Fitness Racing and R&J Racing.

==== Broadcasting career ====
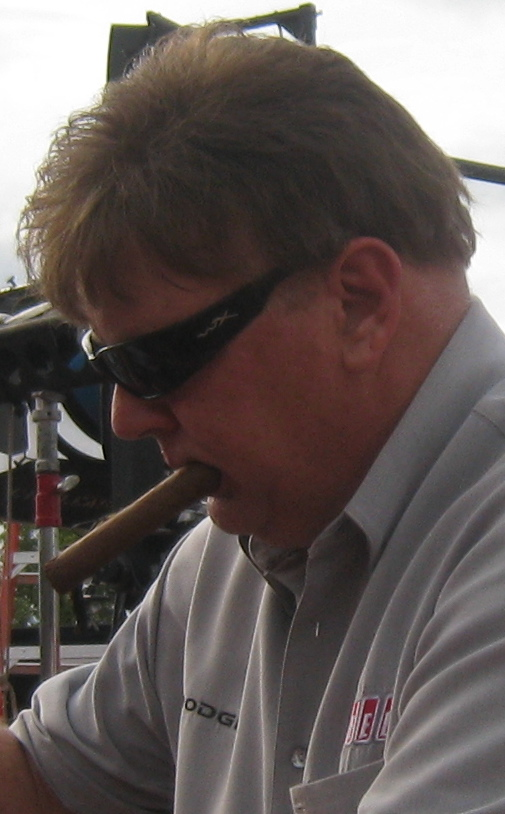
Spencer signing autographs at the 2009 Ford 400 at Homestead-Miami Speedway

When Arnold was unable to locate a sponsor and Ultra closed its doors following a fallout with the Ford Motor Company, Spencer began working on the Speed Channel. He had run both Cup races at Pocono Raceway for Furniture Row Racing in 2006, finishing 32nd and 36th, respectively, which ended up being his last NASCAR starts as a driver. Spencer then worked full-time as an analyst for NASCAR on Speed on the NASCAR RaceDay pre-race show and NASCAR Victory Lane post-race show. In 2010, he was also the host of his own show What's The Deal? along with Ray Dunlap. The show only lasted one year.

Spencer also became a co-anchor on NASCAR Race Hub on Tuesdays and Thursdays. In his television commentary, Spencer talked about the NASCAR highlights while he often feigning sobs with his gag called "The Crying Towel", for which a driver gets the crying towel and a fake cigar if they complain about something that cannot be punishable. In 2012, Spencer named his "Crying Towel" segment as "(Driver) Radio Sweetheart."

In a tweet on May 16, 2012, Spencer stated that he was retired from driving. He continued to co-host Race Hub, mainly alongside Steve Byrnes and Danielle Trotta, until the end of 2013.

=== 2014–present ===
Spencer quietly left NASCAR on Fox (Speed became Fox Sports 1 in August 2013) and NASCAR Race Hub after the 2013 season. Spencer has been largely inactive in the NASCAR community since then aside from an appearance on The Dale Jr. Download in 2021 and appearing on the last episode of Race Hub on June 11, 2024. In 2017, Spencer was quoted as saying “I still watch some races, it's not a top priority anymore, but I miss it."

== Personal life ==
Spencer is married to his wife Pat and has two children and five dogs. He also had a sister, Chrissy, who died of ovarian cancer in 2010. His father, Ed, died of Alzheimer's in 2014. His first grandchild, Hudson, was born in 2016. Spencer and his wife split time between their two residences in North Carolina (where NASCAR teams are based) and Pennsylvania (his home state).

== Motorsports career results ==
=== NASCAR ===
(key) (Bold – Pole position awarded by qualifying time. Italics – Pole position earned by points standings or practice time. * – Most laps led.)

==== Nextel Cup Series ====
NASCAR Nextel Cup Series results
Year	Team	No.	Make	1	2	3	4	5	6	7	8	9	10	11	12	13	14	15	16	17	18	19	20	21	22	23	24	25	26	27	28	29	30	31	32	33	34	35	36	NNCC	Pts	Ref
1989	Baker-Schiff Racing	88	Pontiac	DAY	CAR	ATL	RCH	DAR	BRI	NWS	MAR	TAL	CLT	DOV; 34	SON		MCH; 13	DAY; 27	POC; 15	TAL; 40	GLN; 28	MCH; 12	BRI; 8	DAR; 37	RCH; 29	DOV; 10	MAR	CLT; 16	NWS; 18	CAR; 35	PHO; 10	ATL; 37								34th	1445	
1989	Baker-Schiff Racing	88	Olds													POC; 33																								34th	1445	
1990	Osterlund Racing	57	Pontiac	DAY; 15	RCH; 9	CAR; 8	ATL; 15	DAR; 25	BRI; 18	NWS; 20	MAR; 11	TAL; 32	CLT; 21	DOV; 32	SON; 27	POC; 30	MCH; 20	DAY; 15	POC; 19	TAL; 24	GLN; 29	MCH; 25	BRI; 18	DAR; 23	RCH; 27	DOV; 18	MAR; 18	NWS; 23	CLT; 41	CAR	PHO	ATL								24th	2579	
1991	Travis Carter Enterprises	98	Chevy	DAY; 40	RCH; 34	CAR; 38	ATL; 16	DAR; 11	BRI; 8	NWS; 3	MAR; 6	TAL; 9	CLT; 31	DOV; 28	SON; 29	POC; 14	MCH; 32	DAY; 10	POC; 37	TAL; 37	GLN; 27	MCH; 36	BRI; 15*	DAR; 31	RCH; 15	DOV; 18	MAR; 28	NWS; 23	CLT; 23	CAR; 22	PHO; 7	ATL; 38								25th	2790	
1992	Travis Carter Enterprises	98	Chevy	DAY; DNQ	CAR; 20	RCH; 12	ATL; 37	DAR; 36	BRI; DNQ	NWS; 26	MAR; DNQ	TAL; 32	CLT; 27	DOV	SON	POC	MCH; DNQ	DAY	POC	TAL	GLN	MCH																		33rd	1284	
1992	Moroso Racing	20	Ford																				BRI; 20	DAR	RCH	DOV	MAR	NWS												33rd	1284	
1992	Bobby Allison Motorsports	12	Ford																										CLT; 4	CAR; 11	PHO; 5	ATL; 4								33rd	1284	
1993	Bobby Allison Motorsports	12	Ford	DAY; 13	CAR; 16	RCH; 13	ATL; 10	DAR; 29	BRI; 4	NWS; 14	MAR; 30	TAL; 2	SON; 27	CLT; 7	DOV; 8	POC; 4	MCH; 18	DAY; 39	NHA; 18	POC; 24	TAL; 30	GLN; 3	MCH; 20	BRI; 25	DAR; 15	RCH; 35	DOV; 6	MAR; 3	NWS; 13	CLT; 6	CAR; 20	PHO; 27	ATL; 16							12th	3496	
1994	Junior Johnson & Associates	27	Ford	DAY; 37	CAR; 12	RCH; 22	ATL; 10	DAR; 27	BRI; 35	NWS; 32	MAR; 18	TAL; 4	SON; 26	CLT; 19	DOV; 39	POC; 37	MCH; 23	DAY; 1	NHA; 32	POC; 24	TAL; 1	IND; 43	GLN	MCH; 20	BRI; DNQ	DAR; 37	RCH; 35	DOV; 39	MAR; 20	**NWS**; 23	CLT; 16	CAR; 38	PHO; 38	ATL; 20						29th	2613	
1995	Travis Carter Enterprises	23	Ford	DAY; DNQ	CAR; 30	RCH; 24	ATL; 32	DAR; 36	BRI; 16	NWS; 27	MAR; DNQ	TAL; 9	SON; 17	CLT; 27	DOV; 29	POC; 41	MCH; 30	DAY; 9	NHA; 12	POC; 17	TAL; 10	IND; 23	GLN; 18	MCH; 14	BRI; 18	DAR; 29	RCH; 31	DOV; 16	MAR; 18	NWS; 36	CLT; 12	CAR; 26	PHO; 33	ATL; 6						26th	2809	
1996	Travis Carter Enterprises	23	Ford	DAY; 11	CAR; 27	RCH; 29	ATL; 7	DAR; 32	BRI; 13	NWS; 31	MAR; 19	TAL; 40	SON; 21	CLT; 17	DOV; 6	POC; 8	MCH; 4	DAY; 10	NHA; 17	POC; 24	TAL; 5	IND; 12	GLN; 19	MCH; 10	BRI; 7	DAR; 23	RCH; 30	DOV; 30	MAR; 19	NWS; 20	CLT; 16	CAR; 10	PHO; 18	ATL; 14						15th	3476	
1997	Travis Carter Enterprises	23	Ford	DAY; 35	CAR; 40	RCH; 22	ATL; 32	DAR; 22	TEX; 39	BRI; 15	MAR; 11	SON; 14	TAL; 7	CLT; 18	DOV; 22	POC; 19	MCH; 15	CAL; 5	DAY; 31	NHA; 12	POC; 7	IND; 24	GLN; 34	MCH; 19	BRI; 27	DAR; 28	RCH; 11	NHA; 7	DOV; 36	MAR; 33	CLT; 42	TAL; 24	CAR; 43	PHO; 14	ATL; 24					20th	3079	
1998	Travis Carter Enterprises	23	Ford	DAY; 15	CAR; 4	LVS; 7	ATL; 41	DAR; 21	BRI; 14	TEX; 7	MAR; 30	TAL; 2	CAL; 21	CLT; 13	DOV; 24	RCH; 14	MCH; 11	POC; 10	SON; 29	NHA; 25	POC; 19	IND; 32	GLN; 20	MCH	BRI	NHA; 13	DAR; 34	RCH; 9	DOV; 27	MAR; 19	CLT; 10	TAL; 4	DAY; 12	PHO; 26	CAR; 30	ATL; 21				14th	3464	
1999	Haas-Carter Motorsports	23	Ford	DAY; 41	CAR; 25	LVS; 26	ATL; 17	DAR; 20	TEX; 28	BRI; 17	MAR; 16	TAL; 16	CAL; 36	RCH; 29	CLT; 38	DOV; 23	MCH; 43	POC; 14	SON; 5	DAY; 27	NHA; 9	POC; 20	IND; 26	GLN; 16	MCH; 8	BRI; 2	DAR; 15	RCH; 37	NHA; 24	DOV; 14	MAR; 17	CLT; 28	TAL; 24	CAR; 20	PHO; 17	HOM; 20	ATL; 42			20th	3307	
2000	Haas-Carter Motorsports	26	Ford	DAY; 30	CAR; 26	LVS; 30	ATL; 17	DAR; 23	BRI; 18	TEX; 15	MAR; 28	TAL; 5	CAL; 40	RCH; 17	CLT; 25	DOV; 22	MCH; 15	POC; 36	SON; 34	DAY; 32	NHA; 41	POC; 9	IND; 17	GLN; 31	MCH; 7	BRI; 24	DAR; 32	RCH; 33	NHA; 15	DOV; 34	MAR; 7	CLT; 15	TAL; 38	CAR; 39	PHO; 13	HOM; 5	ATL; 33			22nd	3188	
2001	Haas-Carter Motorsports	26	Ford	DAY; 27	CAR; 30	LVS; 10	ATL; 25	DAR; 4	BRI; 19	TEX; 38	MAR; 9	TAL; 36	CAL; 7	RCH; 16	CLT; 6	DOV; 37	MCH; 11	POC; 17	SON; 27	DAY; 19	CHI; 5	NHA; 4	POC; 12	**IND**; 13	GLN; 38	MCH; 11	BRI; 35	DAR; 31	RCH; 8	DOV; 13	KAN; 22	**CLT**; 11	MAR; 14	TAL; 43	PHO; 31	CAR; 26	HOM; 18	ATL; 40	NHA; 14	16th	3782	
2002	Chip Ganassi Racing	41	Dodge	DAY; DNQ	CAR; 20	LVS; 10	ATL; 26	DAR; 37	BRI; 2	TEX; 8	MAR; 21	TAL; 17	CAL; 27	RCH; 10	CLT; 25	DOV; 23	POC; 21	MCH; 28	SON; 36	DAY; 4	CHI; 32	NHA; 11	POC; 32	IND; 31		MCH; 34	BRI; 8	DAR; 18	RCH; 42	NHA; 15	DOV; 35	KAN; 24	TAL; 21	CLT; 32	MAR; 24	ATL; 30	CAR; 31	PHO; 23	HOM; 42	27th	3187	
2002	Chip Ganassi Racing	42	Dodge																						GLN; DNQ															27th	3187	
2003	Ultra Motorsports	7	Dodge	DAY; 40	CAR; 28	LVS; 17	ATL; 7	DAR; 21	BRI; 12	TEX; 33	TAL; 38	MAR; 19	CAL; 33	RCH; 42	CLT; 4	DOV; 29	POC; 39	MCH; 29	SON; 36	DAY; 12	CHI; 23	NHA; 15	POC; 22	IND; 8	GLN; 23	MCH; 26	BRI	DAR; 22	RCH; 36	NHA; 23	DOV; 15	TAL; 42	KAN; 15	CLT; 26	MAR; 38	ATL; 9	PHO; 40	CAR; 14	HOM; 25	29th	3147	
2004	Ultra Motorsports	7	Dodge	DAY; 24	CAR	LVS	ATL	DAR	BRI																															35th	1969	
2004	Morgan-McClure Motorsports	4	Chevy							TEX; 29	MAR; 38	TAL; 20	CAL; 38	RCH; 41	CLT; 29	DOV; 17	POC; 23	MCH; 28	SON	DAY; 29	CHI; 25	NHA; 23	POC; 23	IND; 19	GLN; 42	MCH; 31	BRI; 31	CAL; 32	RCH; 33	NHA; 38	DOV; 26	TAL; 40	KAN; 25	CLT; 29	MAR; 35	ATL	PHO	DAR	HOM	35th	1969	
2005	Arnold Motorsports	50	Dodge	DAY	CAL	LVS	ATL; 29	BRI; 21	MAR	TEX	PHO	TAL	DAR	RCH	CLT; 42	DOV	POC	MCH	SON	DAY	CHI	NHA	POC	IND; DNQ	GLN		BRI; 28	CAL	RCH; 36	NHA; 39	DOV	TAL	KAN	CLT; DNQ		ATL; DNQ	TEX; 39	PHO; 36	HOM; 31	46th	667	
2005	Peak Fitness Racing	66	Ford																							MCH; 36														46th	667	
2005	R&J Racing	37	Dodge																																MAR; 40					46th	667	
2006	BAM Racing	49	Dodge	DAY	CAL	LVS	ATL	BRI	MAR; DNQ	TEX	PHO	TAL	RCH	DAR	CLT	DOV																								61st	122	
2006	Furniture Row Racing	78	Chevy														POC; 32	MCH; DNQ	SON	DAY	CHI	NHA	POC; 36	IND	GLN	MCH	BRI	CAL	RCH	NHA	DOV	KAN	TAL	CLT	MAR	ATL	TEX	PHO	HOM	61st	122	

===== Daytona 500 =====
Year	Team	Manufacturer	Start	Finish
1990	Osterlund Racing	Pontiac	6	15
1991	Travis Carter Enterprises	Chevrolet	23	40
1992	Travis Carter Enterprises	Chevrolet	DNQ	
1993	Bobby Allison Motorsports	Ford	30	13
1994	Junior Johnson & Associates	Ford	21	37
1995	Travis Carter Enterprises	Ford	DNQ	
1996	Travis Carter Enterprises	Ford	19	11
1997	Travis Carter Enterprises	Ford	7	35
1998	Travis Carter Enterprises	Ford	7	15
1999	Haas-Carter Motorsports	Ford	11	41
2000	Haas-Carter Motorsports	Ford	22	30
2001	Haas-Carter Motorsports	Ford	11	27
2002	Chip Ganassi Racing	Dodge	DNQ	
2003	Ultra Motorsports	Dodge	23	40
2004	Ultra Motorsports	Dodge	40	24

==== Busch Series ====
NASCAR Busch Series results
Year	Team	No.	Make	1	2	3	4	5	6	7	8	9	10	11	12	13	14	15	16	17	18	19	20	21	22	23	24	25	26	27	28	29	30	31	32	33	34	35	NBSC	Pts	Ref
1985	Frank Cicci Racing	67	Pontiac	DAY	CAR	HCY	BRI	MAR	DAR	SBO	LGY	DOV	CLT	SBO	HCY	ROU	IRP	SBO	LGY	HCY	MLW	BRI	DAR	RCH	NWS	ROU	CLT	HCY	CAR; 19	MAR									75th	106	
1987	Frank Cicci Racing	4	Olds	DAY	HCY	MAR	DAR	BRI	LGY	SBO	CLT; 36	DOV																											72nd	55	
1987	Frank Cicci Racing	24	Olds										IRP; DNQ	ROU	JFC	OXF; 41	SBO	HCY	RAL	LGY	ROU	BRI	JFC	DAR	RCH	DOV	MAR												72nd	55	
1987	Frank Cicci Racing	24	Buick																									CLT; DNQ	CAR	MAR									72nd	55	
1988	Frank Cicci Racing	34	Buick	DAY; 29	HCY; 16	CAR; 11	MAR; 8	DAR; 20	BRI; 5	LNG; 8	NZH; 8	SBO; 12	NSV; 3	CLT; 16	DOV; 28	ROU; 3	LAN; 8	LVL; 5	MYB; 18	OXF; 11	SBO; 17	HCY; 22	LNG; 9	IRP; 17	ROU; 16	BRI; 6	DAR; 6	RCH; 16	DOV; 6	MAR; 5	CLT; 29	CAR; 13	MAR; 16						7th	3801	
1989	Frank Cicci Racing	34	Buick	DAY; 34	CAR; 8	MAR; 6	HCY; 1*	DAR; 17	BRI; 9	NZH; 9	SBO; 22	LAN; 15	NSV; 9	CLT; 11	DOV; 26	**ROU**; 1*	LVL; 17	VOL; 26	MYB; 1*	SBO; 17	HCY	DUB	IRP	ROU															15th	2704	
1989	Baker-Schiff Racing	87	Pontiac																						BRI; 6	DAR; 37	RCH; 36	DOV	MAR; 10	CLT; 5	CAR	MAR							15th	2704	
1990	Huffman Racing	77	Buick	DAY	RCH	CAR	MAR	HCY	DAR	BRI	LAN	SBO	NZH	HCY; 3	CLT												DAR; 17	RCH											46th	642	
1990	Rodney Franklin	58	Pontiac													DOV; DNQ	ROU	VOL	MYB	OXF	NHA	SBO	DUB	IRP	ROU	BRI													46th	642	
1990	Henderson Motorsports	75	Olds																										DOV; 26	MAR; 6	CLT; 19	NHA	CAR; DNQ	MAR; 18					46th	642	
1991	Laughlin Racing	45	Pontiac	DAY; 8	RCH	CAR	MAR	VOL	HCY; QL^{†}	DAR; 30	BRI; 4	LAN	SBO	NZH	CLT; QL^{†}	DOV	ROU	HCY	MYB	GLN	OXF	NHA	SBO	DUB	IRP	ROU													42nd	636	
1991	Laughlin Racing	98	Chevy																								BRI; 26	DAR	RCH	DOV									42nd	636	
1991	Laughlin Racing	45	Chevy																												CLT; 11	NHA; 39	CAR	MAR					42nd	636	
1992	Laughlin Racing	45	Chevy	DAY; 4	CAR					BRI; 27					CLT; 40																								17th	2941	
1992	Laughlin Racing	45	Olds			RCH; 18	ATL; 33	MAR	DAR																														17th	2941	
1992	Huffman Racing	77	Buick								HCY; 11	LAN	DUB	NZH																									17th	2941	
1992	Moroso Racing	20	Olds													DOV; 21	ROU; 14	MYB; 1	GLN; 22	VOL; 2	NHA; 38*	TAL; 32	IRP; 7	ROU; 1*	MCH; 25	NHA; 10	BRI; 13	DAR; 12	RCH; 8	DOV; 4	CLT; 6	MAR; 4		HCY; 24					17th	2941	
1992	Allison Racing	28	Ford																														CAR; 32						17th	2941	
1993	Ingram Racing	10	Chevy	DAY; 37	CAR	RCH	DAR	BRI; 31	HCY	ROU	MAR	NZH	CLT; 33									BRI; 11	DAR; 39	RCH			CLT; DNQ	MAR											42nd	838	
1993	Shoemaker Racing	64	Chevy											DOV; 9	MYB	GLN	MLW												CAR; 12	HCY	ATL								42nd	838	
1993	Three Star Motorsports	22	Chevy															TAL; 34	IRP	MCH	NHA																		42nd	838	
1993	Ingram Racing	10	Pontiac																						DOV; 6	ROU													42nd	838	
1994	Shoemaker Racing	64	Chevy	DAY; DNQ	CAR											DOV; 4	MYB	GLN	MLW	SBO	TAL	HCY	IRP	MCH	BRI	DAR; DNQ	RCH; 18	DOV	CLT	MAR	CAR								63rd	348	
1994	Shoemaker Racing	64	Pontiac			RCH; 28	ATL	MAR	DAR	HCY	BRI	ROU	NHA	NZH	CLT																								63rd	348	
1995	Moroso Racing	20	Ford	DAY	CAR	RCH	ATL	NSV	DAR	BRI	HCY	NHA; 40	NZH	CLT; DNQ	DOV; 10	MYB	GLN; 28	MLW	TAL; 2	SBO; 23	IRP	MCH; 7	BRI; 9	DAR; 33	RCH; 6	DOV; 36	CLT; 35	CAR; 39	HOM										34th	1177	
1996	Keystone Motorsports	20	Chevy	DAY; 10	CAR	RCH	ATL	NSV	DAR	BRI; 31			CLT; 40	DOV	SBO	MYB	GLN; 7	MLW	NHA	TAL; 11	IRP	MCH; 42	BRI; 4				CLT; 9		HOM; 6										32nd	1392	
1996	Bown Racing	51	Chevy								HCY; 6	NZH																											32nd	1392	
1996	Mark III Racing	77	Ford																					DAR; 24															32nd	1392	
1996	Keystone Motorsports	20	Ford																						RCH; 21														32nd	1392	
1996	Laughlin Racing	45	Ford																							DOV; 40													32nd	1392	
1996	Laughlin Racing	45	Chevy																									CAR; 25											32nd	1392	
1997	Keystone Motorsports	20	Chevy	DAY; 39	CAR	RCH	ATL	LVS; 27	DAR	HCY	TEX; 2	BRI	NSV	TAL; 21	NHA	NZH	CLT; 4	DOV	SBO	GLN; 4	MLW	MYB	GTY; 40	IRP	MCH; 2	BRI; 1*	DAR	RCH; 11	DOV	CLT; 1*	CAL	CAR	HOM; 5						30th	1576	
1998	Spencer Motor Ventures	12	Chevy	DAY; 9	CAR	LVS; 1	NSV	DAR	BRI	TEX; 31	HCY	TAL; 24	NHA	NZH	CLT; 3	DOV	RCH	PPR	GLN	MLW	MYB	CAL	SBO	IRP	MCH	BRI	DAR	RCH; 3	DOV	CLT; 4	GTY	CAR	ATL	HOM; 2*					43rd	1164	
1999	Spencer Motor Ventures	12	Chevy	DAY	CAR	LVS; 5	ATL	DAR	TEX; DNQ	NSV	BRI	TAL	CAL; 15	NHA	RCH	NZH	CLT; 39	DOV	SBO	GLN	MLW	MYB	PPR	GTY	IRP	MCH; 8	BRI; 34	DAR	RCH; 3	DOV	CLT; 4	CAR	MEM; DNQ	PHO; 3	HOM; 3				43rd	1197	
2000	Spencer Motor Ventures	12	Chevy	DAY	CAR	LVS	ATL	DAR	BRI	TEX	NSV	TAL	CAL	RCH	NHA	CLT; 40	DOV	SBO	MYB	GLN	MLW	NZH	PPR	GTY	IRP	MCH; 42	BRI; 39	DAR	RCH; 9	DOV; 38	CLT	CAR	MEM	PHO	HOM; 25				65th	406	
2001	Phoenix Racing	1	Chevy	DAY	CAR	LVS	ATL	DAR; 13	BRI; 26	TEX; 30	NSH		CAL; 7	RCH; 1*	NHA	NZH	CLT; 8	DOV; 1	KEN	MLW	GLN	CHI; 18	GTY	PPR	IRP	**MCH**; 31	BRI; 7	DAR; 8	RCH; 1*	DOV; 3	KAN; 18	CLT; 6	MEM	**PHO**; 35	CAR	HOM; 36			26th	2329	
2001	Phoenix Racing	1	Pontiac									TAL; 2*																											26th	2329	
2002	Phoenix Racing	1	Pontiac	DAY; 28							TAL; 37										DAY; 8																		26th	2454	
2002	Phoenix Racing	1	Chevy		CAR; 7	LVS; 16	DAR; 24	BRI; 4	TEX; 28	NSH		CAL; 35	RCH; 32	NHA	NZH	CLT; 38	DOV; 37	NSH	KEN	MLW		CHI; 6	GTY	PPR	IRP	MCH; 9	BRI; 1*	DAR; 22	RCH; 32	DOV; 6	KAN; 6	CLT; 34	MEM	ATL; 38	CAR	PHO; 6	HOM; 8		26th	2454	
2003	Tommy Baldwin Racing	6	Dodge	DAY	CAR	LVS	DAR	BRI; 24																															86th	241	
2003	FitzBradshaw Racing	82	Chevy						TEX; 6	TAL	NSH	CAL	RCH	GTY	NZH	CLT	DOV	NSH	KEN	MLW	DAY	CHI	NHA	PPR	IRP	MCH	BRI	DAR	RCH	DOV	KAN	CLT	MEM	ATL	PHO	CAR	HOM		86th	241	
2004	BACE Motorsports	74	Chevy	DAY	CAR	LVS	DAR	BRI	TEX	NSH	TAL	CAL	GTY	RCH	NZH	CLT	DOV	NSH	KEN	MLW	DAY	CHI	NHA	PPR	IRP	MCH	BRI	CAL	RCH	DOV	KAN	CLT; 22	MEM	ATL	PHO; 39		HOM; 28		92nd	222	
2004	Michael Waltrip Racing	98	Chevy																																	DAR; DNQ			92nd	222	
2005	Michael Waltrip Racing	98	Chevy	DAY	CAL	MXC	LVS	ATL; 27	NSH	BRI	TEX	PHO	TAL	DAR	RCH	CLT	DOV	NSH	KEN	MLW	DAY	CHI	NHA	PPR															120th	82	
2005	Red Cactus Racing	73	Chevy																						GTY; DNQ	IRP	GLN	MCH	BRI	CAL	RCH	DOV	KAN	CLT	MEM	TEX	PHO	HOM	120th	82	
^{†} - Qualified but replaced by Jeff Burton

==== Craftsman Truck Series ====
NASCAR Craftsman Truck Series results
Year	Team	No.	Make	1	2	3	4	5	6	7	8	9	10	11	12	13	14	15	16	17	18	19	20	21	22	23	24	25	NCTC	Pts	Ref
2003	Ultra Motorsports	2	Dodge	DAY	DAR	MMR	MAR	CLT	DOV	TEX	MEM	MLW	KAN	KEN	GTW	MCH	IRP	NSH	BRI	RCH; 29	**NHA**; 1*	CAL	LVS	SBO	TEX	MAR; 6	PHO	HOM	55th	416	
2004	Ultra Motorsports	2	Dodge	DAY	ATL	MAR	MFD	CLT	DOV	TEX	MEM	MLW; 16	KAN	KEN	GTW	MCH	IRP	NSH	BRI										55th	303	
2004	Phoenix Racing	09	Dodge																	RCH; 28									55th	303	
2004	ThorSport Racing	13	Chevy																		NHA; 18	LVS	CAL	TEX	MAR	PHO	DAR	HOM	55th	303	
2005	Ultra Motorsports	2	Dodge	DAY; 2	CAL; 7	ATL; 17	MAR; 8	GTY; 3	MFD; 14	CLT; 12	DOV; 24	TEX; 21	MCH; 14	MLW; 12	KAN; 6	KEN; 11	MEM; 22	IRP; 5	NSH; 16	BRI; 7	RCH; 9	NHA; 6	LVS; 31	MAR; 27	ATL; 23	TEX; 24	PHO; 33	HOM; 14	12th	3050	

=== ARCA Hooters SuperCar Series ===
(key) (Bold – Pole position awarded by qualifying time. Italics – Pole position earned by points standings or practice time. * – Most laps led.)

ARCA Hooters SuperCar Series results
Year	Team	No.	Make	1	2	3	4	5	6	7	8	9	10	11	12	13	14	15	16	17	18	19	20	21	AHSC	Pts	Ref
1989		46	Buick	DAY; 15	ATL	KIL	TAL	FRS	POC	KIL	HAG	POC	TAL	DEL	FRS	ISF	TOL	DSF	SLM	ATL					128th	-	
1994	Junior Johnson & Associates	2	Ford	DAY	TAL	FIF	LVL	KIL	TOL	FRS	MCH	DMS; 3	POC	POC	KIL	FRS									100th	325	
1994	Roulo Brothers Racing	39	Chevy														INF; 24	I70	ISF	DSF	TOL	SLM	WIN	ATL	100th	325	

Sporting positions
Preceded by Richie Evans	NASCAR Winston Modified Tour Champion; 1986–1987	Succeeded by Mike McLaughlin
