= NASCAR Victory Lane =

US television program

- Genre: Sports highlights
- Starring: Chris Myers (Fox Season); Kevin Burkhardt (NBC Season); Michael Waltrip; Jimmy Spencer; Kenny Wallace
- Country of origin: United States
- Original language: English
- No. of seasons: 17

Production
- Running time: 30 minutes

Original release
- Network: Fox Sports Net (2001); Speed (2002–2012); Fox Sports/Speed (2013); FS1 (2013–2017)
- Release: February 18, 2001 – November 19, 2017

Related
- NASCAR RaceDay; NASCAR Race Hub; NASCAR Trackside

NASCAR Victory Lane was a post-race show for NASCAR Sprint Cup Series events. The program was broadcast on Fox Sports 1 and was hosted by John Roberts or Chris Myers. It also starred Jimmy Spencer, Michael Waltrip, Kenny Wallace, Wendy Venturini and Bob Dillner, and analyzed the day's event with highlights, post-race interviews and interaction with the winning driver and crew chief. After the 2017 season the show was discontinued.

== History ==
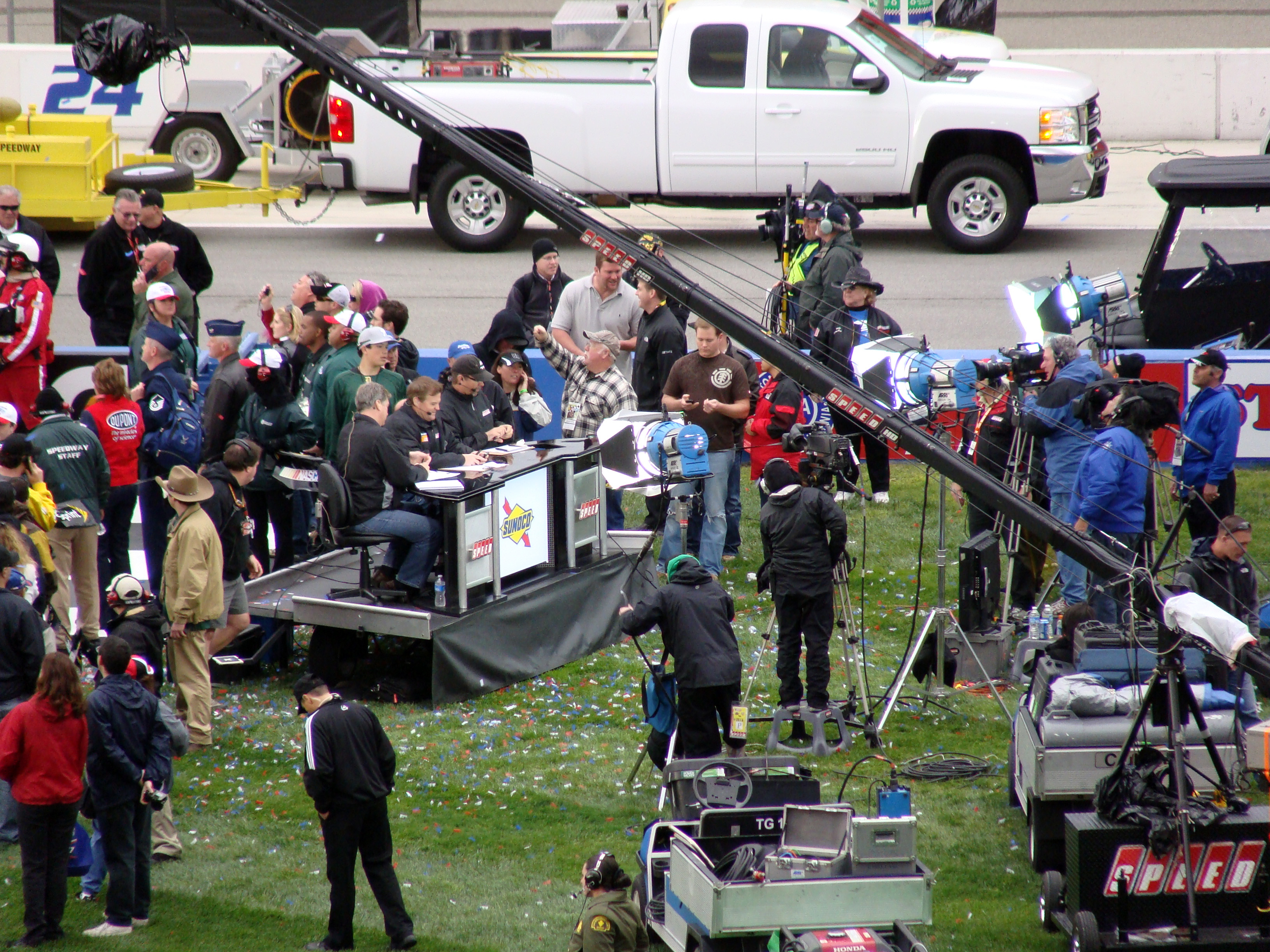
The Victory Lane set following a race at Auto Club Speedway in 2010

NASCAR Victory Lane debuted in 2001 with hosts John Roberts and Derrike Cope. In 2010, Kyle Petty replaced Jimmy Spencer, who was reassigned to other NASCAR programming. Jeff Hammond replaced Petty for the four of the six TNT races, with Jimmy Spencer doing the other two. Rick Allen, the play-by-play announcer for Speed's NASCAR Camping World Truck Series races, replaced Roberts in 2012 while he is reassigned to the NASCAR on FOX studio as a result of Chris Myers' bereavement leave. The show moved to Fox Sports 1 on the August 18, 2013 edition, after the channel replaced Speed, and was shortened from 60 Minutes to 30 Minutes.

== See also ==
- NASCAR RaceDay
- NASCAR Race Hub
- NASCAR Trackside
