= Bob Dillner =

American motorsports journalist

- Born: November 29, 1969 (age 56); Huntington, New York, U.S.
- Occupation: Motorsports journalist
- Years active: 1992–present
- Spouse: Angie Dillner

Bob Dillner (born November 29, 1969) is an American motorsports journalist and television broadcaster. Born in Huntington, New York, he owns and operates Speed51.com. He was also the creator of Trackside Long Island, which first aired in 1992. Afterward, he became a Speed Channel commentator. For 2016 he was a color analyst for Monster Jam on FS1. He currently resides in Boone, North Carolina. Previously he lived in Concord, North Carolina. He is currently a professor at Appalachian State University specializing in sports and news reporting. He has been the lead commentator for the SMART Modified Tour since 2023.

== Career ==
Starting in June of 1997, Dillner announced races for the American Speed Association on The Nashville Network. He continued through the 2002 season.

Dillner has worked for FOX Sports covering the top three series of NASCAR, as well as the lead play-by-play announcer for NASCAR K&N Pro Series, NASCAR Whelen Modified Tour and the NASCAR Toyota Series. He also served as an analyst on NASCAR Live, NASCAR Race Hub, and as a reporter on NASCAR RaceDay and NASCAR Victory Lane.

Dillner has covered many racing disciplines in his career such as ARCA, CART, IRL, NHRA, IHRA, World of Outlaws, and Chili Bowl Nationals,as well as various late model racing series.

Dillner has been on pit road for many different events including Super DIRT Week in Syracuse, New York.

In 2016, Dillner was the color analyst for Monster Jam on FS1. He did not return for 2017.

Dillner is also the owner of Speed51.com, the largest pavement short-track racing website in America.

Apart from motorsports, Dillner is currently an executive producer for Appalachian Weekly News, educating students in television production.
