= Trackside =

Trackside may refer to:

- NASCAR Trackside, an American automotive television series which ran from 2010–2013
- TAB Trackside, a New Zealand horse racing and sports broadcast network
- Trackside (festival), see List of music festivals in Australia
- "Trackside", a song by Moka Only from the 2000 album Road Life
