= Shannon Spake =

American NASCAR announcer

- Spake in 2020
- Born: July 23, 1976 (age 50)
- Education: Florida Atlantic University (BA)
- Occupations: Sportscaster, Sports reporter, NASCAR reporter, Television personality
- Employer(s): Speed Channel (2005–2006); ESPN (2007–2016); Fox Sports (2016–2024); NASCAR Digital Media/TNT Sports (2024–present); FanDuel Sports Network Southeast (2024–present)
- Children: 2

Shannon Spake (born July 23, 1976) is a pit reporter and host for NASCAR on TNT and the Hornets on FanDuel Sports Network Southeast. Spake also hosts the Sons & Daughters Podcast. Spake previously worked for Fox Sports as a host for NASCAR RaceDay and NASCAR Race Hub, and a sideline reporter for coverage of the NFL on Fox, Fox College Hoops and Fox College Football. Prior to Fox Sports, she worked for ESPN where she contributed to SportsCenter with pre and post-game reports, and also worked as a sideline reporter for SEC on ESPN basketball games as well as college football games.

== Early life and education ==
Shannon Spake was born in July 23, 1976 and grew up in Sunrise, Florida. She was diagnosed with scoliosis as a child and underwent back surgery at 13. She is a graduate of Piper High School, where she was on the swim team. She later earned a swimming scholarship for Broward College, although she ultimately transferred to Florida Atlantic University, where she received a B.A. in Communications.

In 1999, Spake served as an intern for the Miami-based radio talk show host Neil Rogers.

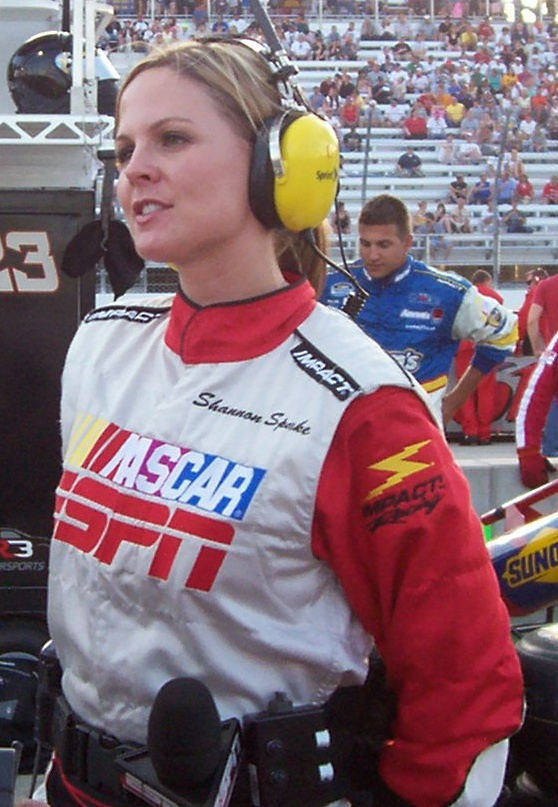
Shannon Spake at the 2009 NASCAR Nationwide Series event at the Milwaukee Mile

== Career ==
Before becoming an on-air reporter, Spake worked for Nickelodeon, CBS (on The Early Show with Bryant Gumbel), and MTV as a production assistant.

In 2005, Spake worked at the Speed Channel, where she co-hosted NASCAR Nation in its second version and was a reporter in its first. She also co-hosted Back Seat Drivers, a talk show, with online columnist Marty Smith. Her previous on-air jobs included those at WCCB in Charlotte, North Carolina, and Carolina Sports and Entertainment Television.

=== ESPN (2007-2016) ===
From 2007 to 2013, Spake was a NASCAR pit reporter for the network and contributed to both NASCAR Countdown and NASCAR Now. For the 2008 season, Spake was a full-time pit reporter for Nationwide and Sprint Cup races aired on ESPN. She would continue this role until ESPN lost the broadcast rights to NBC Sports beginning with the 2015 season. On August 13, 2013, Spake agreed to a multi-year contract extension with ESPN.

=== Fox Sports (2016-2024) ===
It was announced on July 6, 2016, that Fox Sports had hired Spake to serve as a sideline reporter on their college football and basketball broadcasts, as a contributor to NASCAR Race Hub, and as a sideline reporter for select NFL broadcasts.

On February 13, 2017, Spake was named the new co-host of NASCAR Race Hub, working alongside Adam Alexander, replacing Danielle Trotta. Spake also hosted the NASCAR RaceDay pre-race broadcast for Fox's NASCAR coverage on Saturdays and Sundays.

=== Other career activities ===
In 2017, Spake was the voice of Shannon Spokes in the Pixar film Cars 3.

Spake interviewing Jabrill Peppers in 2019

On July 12, 2024, it was announced that Fox and Spake had parted ways. Spake moved over to NASCAR Digital Media/TNT Sports to host NASCAR Inside The Playoffs. In June 2025, Spake announced she was launching the SPAKE UP Podcast. Spake also became the pre and post-race show host for NASCAR on TNT's new coverage.

In 2026, Marty Smith joined TNT as their pre and post-race show host and Spake switched to pit reporting for TNT. It was Spake's first time pit reporting for NASCAR since 2013 when she was with ESPN. In addition to pit reporting, Spake works as a host for Bally Sports Southeast and as a reporter for the Charlotte Hornets. Spake said it has been a "blessing" to do something different by covering the NBA after following football for so many years.

Spake spoke with The Charlotte Observer in 2026 about the difficulty in finding a job in sports reporting as a middle-aged woman. She also said it has been difficult forming relationships with the Hornets players due to their large difference in age.

== Personal life ==
Spake has said that 9/11 served as a turning point in her life— in addition to wanting a career, she realized she wanted a family with children.

Spake married her husband, Jerry McSorley, on April 14, 2008. Spake worked as a pit reporter throughout her pregnancy in 2009. She gave birth to twins, Brady and Liam, on January 1, 2010. The family lives in Charlotte, North Carolina. In 2020, Spake and McSorley got divorced. As of 2026, she has a boyfriend.

Despite having scoliosis as a child, Spake was active in the endurance sports community. She has competed in four full marathons and seven 70.3 Ironman events as well as many shorter distance triathlons. In 2020, she tore her hamstring and had to have sugery. During recovery, she fell out with endurance sports, although she still enjoys them occasionally.
