= NASCAR RaceDay =

- Also known as: NASCAR RaceDay fueled by Sunoco
- Genre: Sports
- Starring: Shannon Spake (Fox Season); Adam Alexander (NBC Season); Bobby Labonte; Larry McReynolds; Regan Smith; Bob Pockrass; Jamie McMurray
- Country of origin: United States
- Original language: English
- No. of seasons: 13

Production
- Production location: Fox Network Center Charlotte, North Carolina
- Running time: 60 minutes

Original release
- Network: Fox Sports Net (2001–2004); Speed (2005–2013); Fox Sports 1 (2013–present); Fox (2018-present)
- Release: 2001 – present

Related
- NASCAR Victory Lane; NASCAR Race Hub

NASCAR RaceDay (also known as NASCAR RaceDay fueled by Sunoco) is an American pre-race television show on Fox Sports 1 and Fox that precedes all NASCAR Cup Series race broadcasts. Part of the Fox NASCAR series, the show previously aired on Fox Sports Net and Speed. NASCAR RaceDay is hosted by Shannon Spake or Adam Alexander with analysis from Bobby Labonte and Jamie McMurray from the Fox Sports studio in Charlotte, North Carolina. Bob Pockrass reports from the track.

== History ==
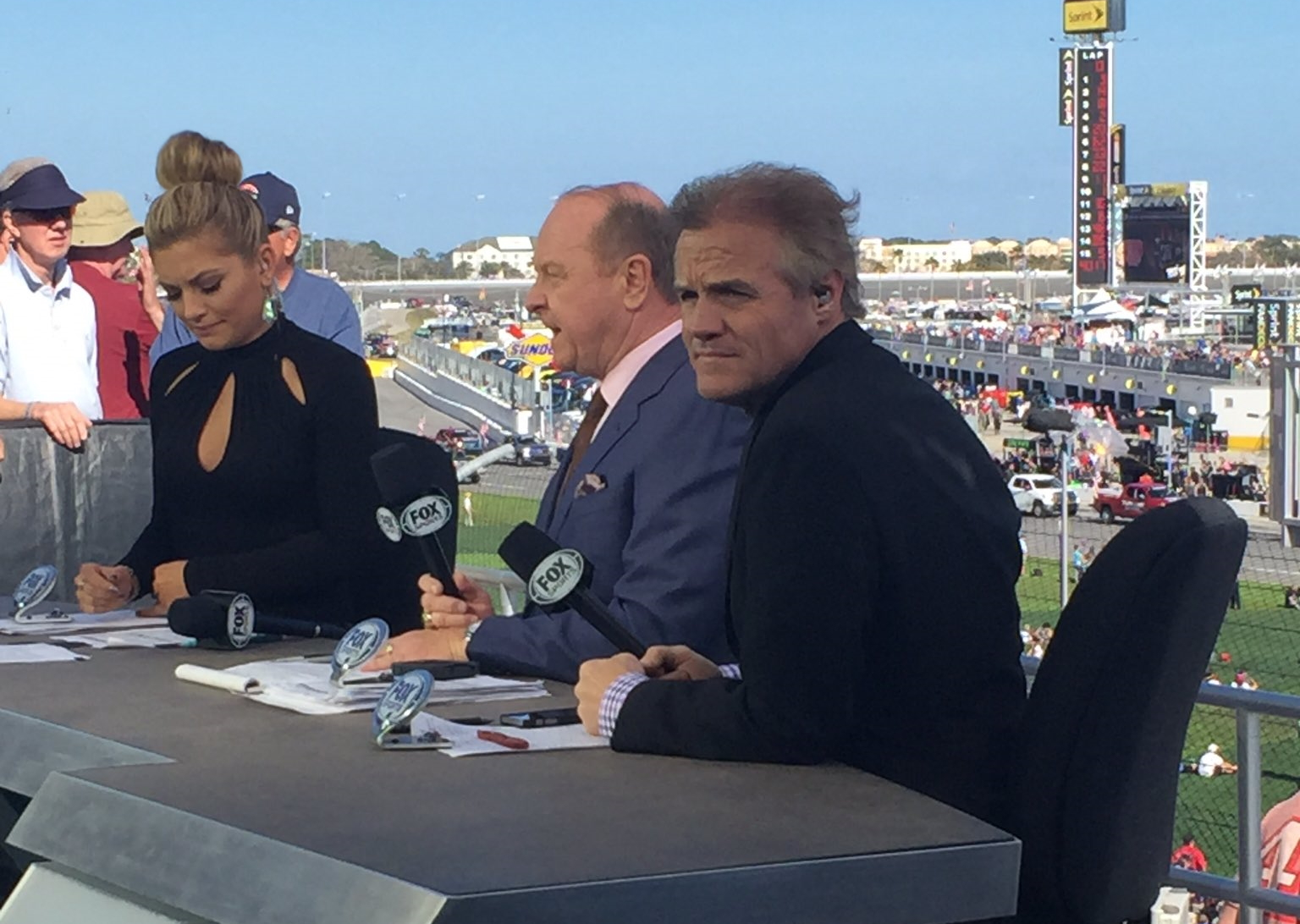
NASCAR Raceday at Daytona International Speedway in 2016

The show replaced the canceled NASCAR 2Day, that had aired on ESPN until the end of the 2000 racing season when NASCAR began a new television contract. The original name of the show was NASCAR This Morning, and it aired on Fox Sports Net from 2001 to 2004 from a studio in Charlotte, North Carolina. During the 2004 Chase for the Nextel Cup, some segments were broadcast from the site of that week's race with Steve Byrnes serving as co-host. In 2005, the program was moved to Speed, and broadcast on-location from each race (similarly to ESPN's College GameDay). The show became NASCAR RaceDay in 2006 hosted by John Roberts with analysis by Jimmy Spencer and Kenny Wallace. At the start of 2012 Steve Byrnes replaced Roberts, as he moved to the NASCAR on Fox studio show following host Chris Myers being placed on bereavement leave following the death of his son. Beginning on August 18, 2013, with the show’s move to Fox Sports 1, the two-hour broadcast was shortened to one hour.

Beginning in 2014, the Speed Stage was retired and only used for Speedweeks and the NASCAR on Fox team of Chris Myers, Jeff Hammond, and Michael Waltrip was used during the Fox portion of the season, and all RaceDay and NASCAR Victory Lane broadcasts began to originate from the Hollywood Hotel while Roberts, Wallace, and Hammond took over beginning at Pocono in June. Starting at Pocono, RaceDay and Victory Lane began to originate from the Fox Sports 1 studios in Charlotte. Beginning with Indianapolis, RaceDay was expanded to two hours (one hour for Saturday night races on Fox Sports 2) until Chicagoland when the show was again shortened to one hour to make room for FS1's Sunday morning pre-game show Fox NFL Kickoff. Before the 2015 season, both Petty and Rutledge Wood left Fox Sports and moved to NBC Sports.
