= Grand Prix Story =

2011 video game

- Developer: Kairosoft
- Platforms: Android, iOS, Nintendo Switch, PlayStation 4
- Release: Android: WW: 8 June 2011; iOS: WW: 8 September 2011; Switch: WW: 21 March 2019; PlayStation 4: WW: 15 October 2020
- Genre: Simulation
- Mode: Single player

Grand Prix Story is an auto racing management simulation video game developed and published by Kairosoft for the Android and iOS operating systems. It was first released for Android on June 8, 2011, and for iOS on September 8, 2011. A port for the Nintendo Switch was released on March 21, 2019. The player serves as the manager for a racing team and controls the research and development of the team's cars, its crew and drivers, and the races they perform in. The game was released to mostly positive reviews.

== Gameplay ==
Grand Prix Story is a management simulation video game, in which the player controls a new racing team. Players progress their team through races, which earn them money and unlocks longer and more difficult single race and grand prix events. As the game progresses, the terrain on which the cars race often changes, forcing the player to take into account varying road conditions and rain.

One of the large differences from past Kairosoft efforts such as Game Dev Story and Hot Springs Story is that progress is made visual during races. The player does not control the cars during races, and instead watches as their driver races the cars that they have improved and worked on beforehand. As the player's team wins Grand Prix events, the racing team expands to include multiple teams that the player must manage.

== Reception ==
Reception

Aggregate score
Aggregator	Score
Metacritic	74/100

Review scores
Publication	Score
IGN	8.5/10
TouchArcade	4/5

The game received mostly mixed reviews from critics, with a 74/100 from review aggregator website Metacritic. IGN's Nick Kolan felt that the visuals and the formula from past Kairosoft efforts were the same, but that the execution of the concept, and the visual feedback provided by it, improved the game handily. TouchArcade's Brad Nicholson felt that the game ratcheted up after its slow beginning, feeling that the addition of multiple teams to manage makes the game more interesting in the longer term.

Edge criticized Kairosoft's formula for its management games, feeling that Grand Prix Story reminded them more of deja vu than a fresh concept. They critiqued the game's non-interactive races, as they felt the races were dull to watch and made for a rather flat game. TouchArcade called the racing segments, "of having to wait and watch for most of the game’s finer points of its simulation" in their overall positive review.
