= Ed Spencer =

American racing driver

- Born: January 5, 1929; Nanticoke, Pennsylvania, U.S.
- Died: April 3, 2014 (aged 85); Drums, Pennsylvania, U.S.

NASCAR Cup Series career
- 1 race run over 1 year
- Best finish: 153rd (1953)
- First race: 1953 Race No. 33 (Bloomsburg)
Wins	Top tens	Poles
0	0	0

Edgar Robert Spencer Sr. (January 5, 1929 – April 3, 2014) was an American modified and stock car racing driver. Father of Jimmy Spencer and grandfather of Ed Spencer III, he competed in local competition in Pennsylvania, and competed in one NASCAR Grand National Series race.

== Life and career ==
Spencer was born in Nanticoke, Pennsylvania on January 5, 1929. Known as "Fast Eddie", he made his career racing on local tracks in Pennsylvania, winning track championships at Port Royal Speedway and Selinsgrove Speedway among other tracks; he is reported to have won over 500 races in various local racing classes.

Spencer made a single start in the NASCAR Grand National Division in 1953 at the Bloomsburg Fairgrounds, finishing 20th. He received an offer to compete in the Indianapolis 500 in the early 1960s, but declined due to family responsibilities.

In 2011, Spencer was inducted into Port Royal Speedway's Hall of Fame. He died on April 3, 2014, in Drums, Pennsylvania.
