= John Roberts (sportscaster) =

American motorsports commentator

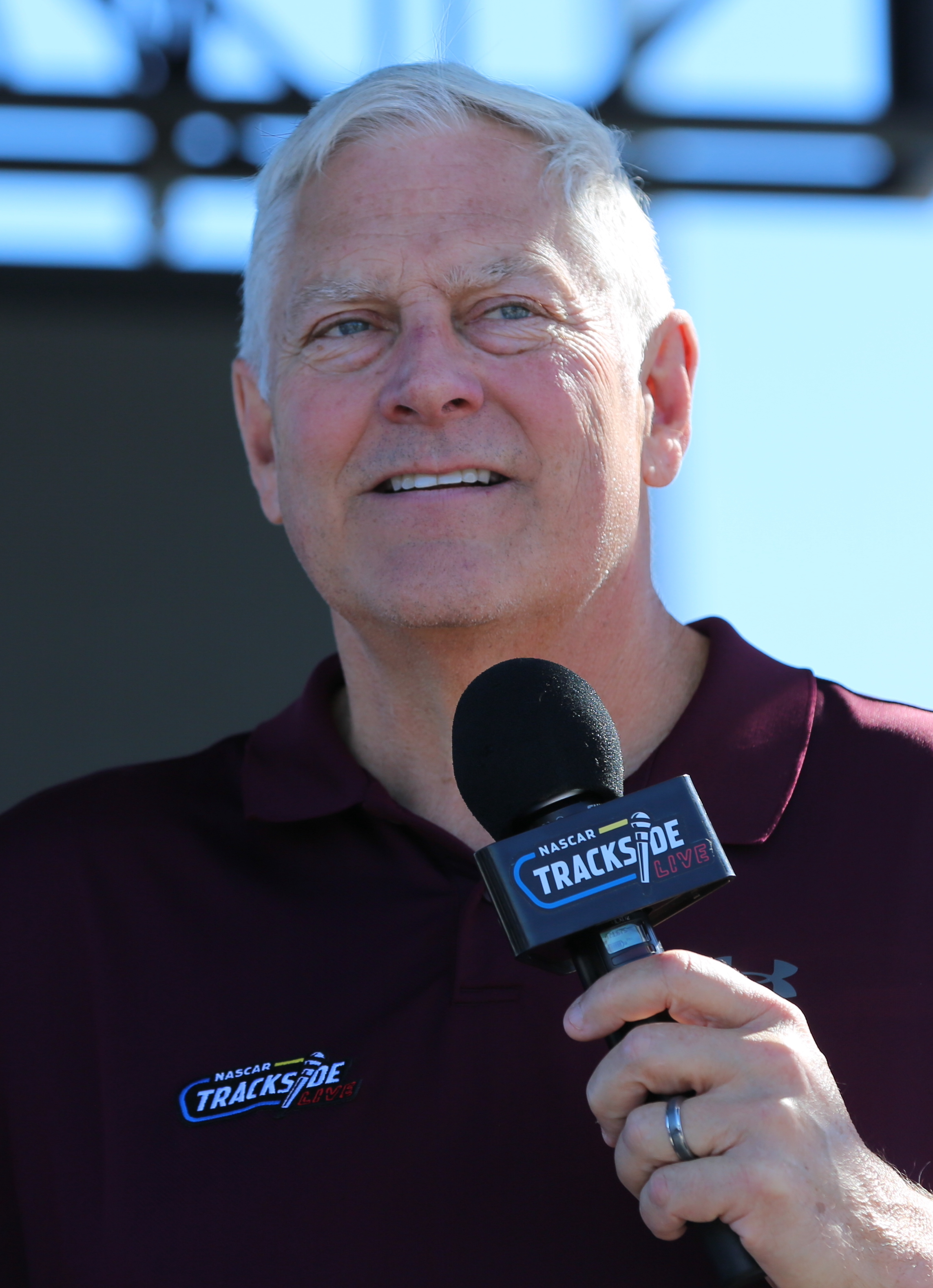
- Roberts at Las Vegas Motor Speedway in 2025
- Born: October 2, 1965 (age 60); Washington, D.C., U.S.
- Occupation: TV sports announcer
- Years active: 1986–Present
- Known for: Reporter on NASCAR on Speed and NASCAR on Fox

John Roberts (born October 2, 1965) is an American former on-air broadcaster for NASCAR coverage on Speed Channel, which later became Fox Sports 1. He appeared on NASCAR Race Hub and NASCAR Live! and until 2014, he appeared on NASCAR RaceDay and NASCAR Victory Lane, while also having served as a substitute studio host for NASCAR on Fox in 2012. He co-hosted Tradin’ Paint on SiriusXM NASCAR Radio up until that show's cancellation.

== Career ==
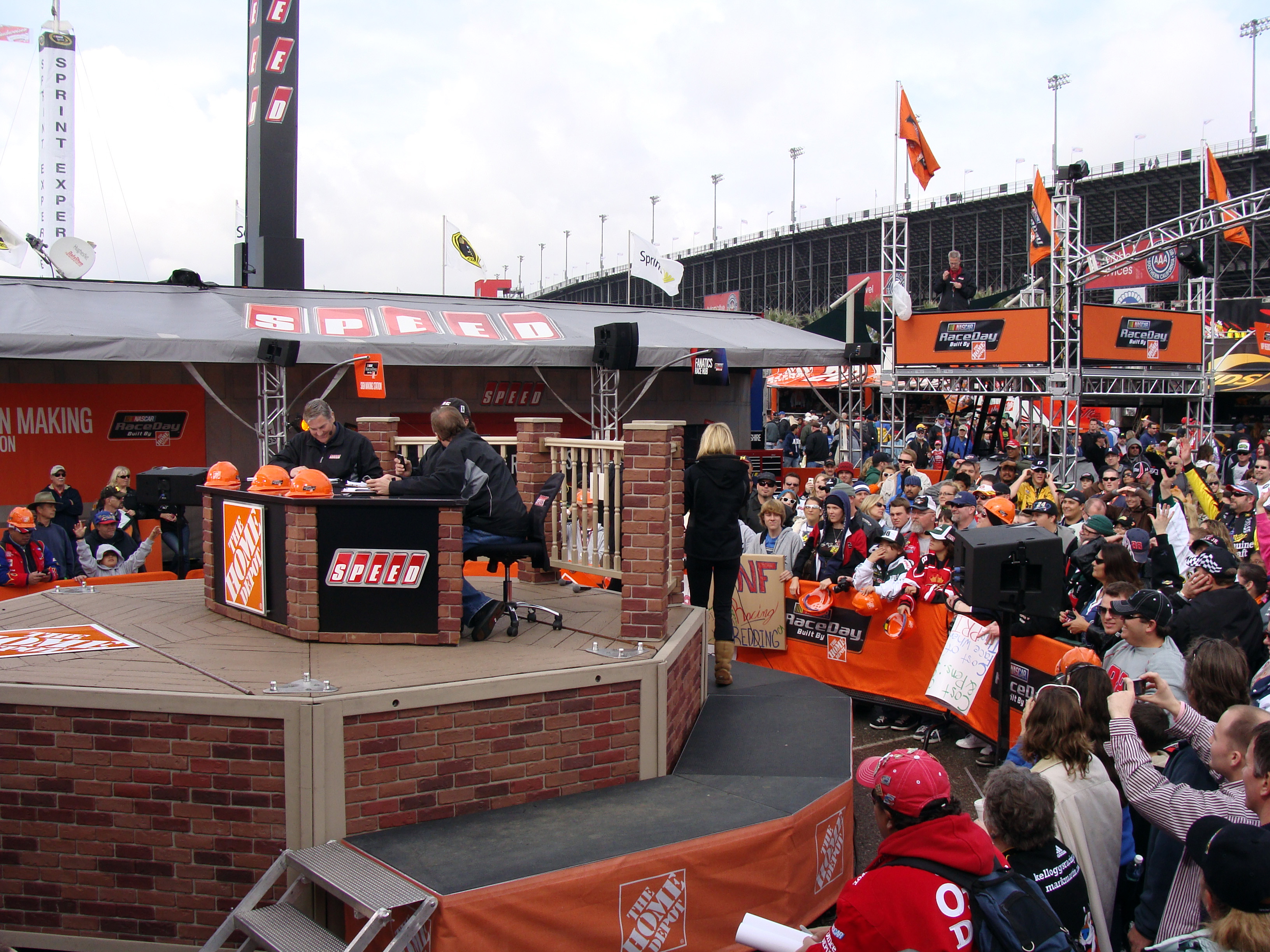
Roberts (furthest to the left at the table) on NASCAR RaceDay at Fontana in 2010

His career started in 1986 at WHSV TV in Harrisonburg, Virginia. He then worked at WBTV in Charlotte before moving to the Fox Network-owned Speed Channel to host NASCAR RaceDay and NASCAR Victory Lane.

In 2012, Roberts was the interim studio host for the 2012 Daytona 500, filling in for Chris Myers, who was on bereavement leave due to the death of his son.

Following the Homestead 2018 edition of RaceDay, Roberts announced on Twitter that he would be retiring and that would be his last broadcast. Towards the end of his tenure at Fox, he hosted the Truck Series pre-race show from the NASCAR on Fox studio in Charlotte, where he was replaced by Kaitlyn Vincie in 2019, who previously had been a pit reporter for the Truck Series.

Since 2019, Roberts hosts Tradin’ Paint every weekday on SiriusXM NASCAR Radio from 1pm-3pm EST with Chocolate Myers.

== Personal life ==
Roberts was born in Washington, D.C. He attended James Madison University.
