= NASCAR Trackside =

- Starring: Krista Voda (2010–2013); Kyle Petty (2011–2013); Kaitlyn Vincie (2013); Rutledge Wood (2007–2010 as reporter, 2011 as host, 2012–2013 as panelist) Steve Byrnes (2001–2011); Jeff Hammond (2001–2011); Larry McReynolds (2001–2010); Marianela Pereyra (2011–2012); Elliott Sadler (2005–2011); Darrell Waltrip (2001–2011)
- Country of origin: United States

Production
- Running time: 60 minutes

Original release
- Network: Speed Channel
- Release: 2001 – August 16, 2013

NASCAR Trackside was a NASCAR race themed show hosted by Krista Voda on Speed Channel. The show also featured former NASCAR driver Kyle Petty and SPEED personalities Rutledge Wood and Kaitlyn Vincie. Elliott Sadler and former NASCAR crew chief Jeff Hammond occasionally occupied the seat in Petty's absence. During the Michigan broadcast on August 13, 2010 Steve Byrnes announced he was leaving the show to be the host for NASCAR Race Hub also broadcast on Speed. In 2011, he hosted the show during the NASCAR on FOX Sprint Cup coverage.

The show was originally broadcast from various locations in and around the track, from pit road to the infield to the garage. Eventually this format was dropped and Trackside was re-located to the Speed Stage which was usually placed outside of the racetrack. Guests included former and current NASCAR drivers as well as NASCAR personalities and celebrities that happened to be at the track.

The final episode of the show aired on August 16, 2013 after being cancelled June 25, 2013 along with 2 other Speed Channel shows Speed Center and WindTunnel with Dave Despain due to Speed Channel's transition into Fox Sports 1 on August 17, 2013.
