= Hot Springs Story =

2011 video game

- Developer: Kairosoft
- Publisher: Samsung Electronics
- Designers: Adrian Frutiger; Alan Aldridge
- Platforms: iOS, Android, Nintendo Switch
- Release: iOS; February 28, 2011; Android; April 18, 2011; Nintendo Switch; October 11, 2018
- Genre: Simulation
- Mode: Single player

Hot Springs Story is a hot spring resort business simulation video game developed and published by Kairosoft for the Android, iOS, and the Nintendo Switch. It was released for iOS on February 28, 2011, for Android on April 18, 2011, and for Nintendo Switch on October 11, 2018. The game focuses on a hot spring resort which the player is tasked with managing and making a profit from. It received mostly positive reviews from critics. A sequel, Hot Springs Story 2, was released in 2020.

== Gameplay ==
Hot Springs Story focuses on a hot spring resort business, where it is the player's job to expand the resort and to juggle the needs of customers. In order to attract more wealthy clientele, the player must impress guidebook writers who will increase the rating of the establishment. The player must juggle advertising, construction, and using booster items on specific rooms to increase their desirability for customers, all while managing the staff and a number of different issues.

=== Economy types ===
Economy status	What happens
Bubble	More overnight guests
Boom	More investments
Steady	Usual business
Recess	Negative effects on advertising
Depression	No money on guests

=== Customer Patience ===
Not all customers are the same, and have different patient levels.

Number	Customer Type	Patience Level	Overnight Stayer
1.	Antique Dlr	Low	Yes
2.	College Student	Low	Yes
3.	Office Clerk	Medium	Maybe
4.	Singer	Medium	No
5.	Farmer	Medium	Yes
6.	Yuppie	High	Maybe

== Reception ==
Reception

Aggregate score
Aggregator	Score
Metacritic	83/100

Review scores
Publication	Score
Eurogamer	7/10
IGN	8.0/10
TouchArcade	4.5/5 stars

Although Hot Springs Story received mostly positive reviews, the reception was muted compared to the hype and success that Kairosoft's previous Western release, Game Dev Story, garnered; it received an 83/100 from review aggregator website Metacritic. IGN's Levi Buchanan felt that although it lacked the charm of Game Dev Story, that Hot Springs Story was in some ways deeper, with the building aspects giving it more depth overall. TouchArcade noted that although the game could feel daunting at first, it ultimately was an incredibly deep and addicting simulation game. Pocket Gamer's Mike Rose praised the game's content and special features, but felt that the game held little to no direction in the very beginning. Gamezebo's Dan Zuccarelli heavily criticized the game for "playing itself", noting that he fell asleep during one playthrough without it affecting his progress in the game.
