= Chris Myers =

American sportscaster

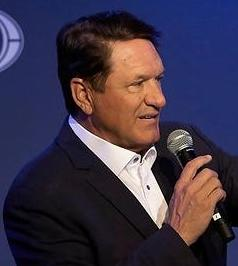
- Myers in 2019
- Born: 1959 or 1960 (age 66–67)
- Occupation: Sportscaster

Chris Myers (born 1959 or 1960) is an American sportscaster for FOX Sports. He has covered the Super Bowl, the World Series, the NBA Finals, the NCAA Final Four, The Masters, the U.S. Open, the Triple Crown, the Olympics, the Daytona 500, and the Indianapolis 500.

== Early life and career ==
Chris Myers broke into broadcasting as a 16-year-old high school student when he hosted his own show on Miami's WKAT radio. He graduated from Chaminade High School, followed by Miami Dade Community College and Florida International University. In the 1980s, Myers hosted a sports radio call-in show on WIOD-AM in Miami before moving to New Orleans to work for broadcast station WWL.

== ESPN (1988–1998) ==
Myers spent ten years (1988–1998) at ESPN, hosting SportsCenter, Baseball Tonight, and other shows. He received an Emmy for the interview program Up Close, on which he was the first to conduct live interviews with O. J. Simpson after both his murder trial and wrongful death civil lawsuit.

Myers reported during the 1989 San Francisco earthquake at the World Series. He was the only on-scene reporter who stayed on the air through the night broadcasting from Atlanta during the Centennial Olympic Park bombing.

== Fox Sports (1998–present) ==
In December 1998, Myers joined Fox Sports and Fox Sports Net, where he was one of the anchors of Fox Sports News (later rebranded as the National Sports Report) and the weekly sports magazine program Goin' Deep. In 2005, he debuted The Chris Myers Interview on FSN (which would later go on to become a podcast). In 2000, Myers joined Fox Sports Radio where he currently hosts his own interview show, CMI, which is heard on over 200 affiliates. Myers conducted the last public interview with the late John Wooden in April 2010 on CMI.

Myers has been the studio host for Fox NASCAR coverage since the network began coverage in 2001, up until 2018 when Fox Sports went to a studio format in their Charlotte studios. He also serves as an announcer and/or a reporter for Fox NFL, Fox College Football, and Fox Major League Baseball, and was a reporter for Fox's coverage of the Bowl Championship Series.

Myers has been a reporter on multiple Super Bowls and World Series for the Fox television network.

=== NFL on Fox ===
Myers has worked for the NFL on Fox since 2003 as either a play-by-play commentator and/or a sideline reporter.

Myers has been working NFL play-by play for Fox since 2005. He has a full NFL play-by-play schedule with Mark Schlereth and sideline reporter Jen Hale. Myers' previous NFL on FOX partners include: Tim Ryan, Ronde Barber, and Daryl Johnston.

Before being replaced by Erin Andrews in 2013, Myers had joined Joe Buck, Troy Aikman, Cris Collinsworth (2005 only), and Pam Oliver for Fox's coverage of the NFC playoffs and the Super Bowl (when Fox has the rights to it). He would later return and pair with Andrews after she replaced Oliver as Fox's lead reporter in 2014 before being replaced again in 2021, this time by Tom Rinaldi.

During a Detroit Lions and New Orleans Saints game, on September 13, 2009, Myers made a remark about linebacker Larry Foote's decision to leave the perennially strong Pittsburgh Steelers to play for Detroit, "That's like going from dating Beyoncé to Whoopi Goldberg!"

Myers visited American armed forces in Qatar on behalf of Fox Sports and gave a live broadcast with the armed forces on the pre-game show before the New Orleans Saints played the Dallas Cowboys on Thanksgiving Day 2010.

=== MLB on Fox ===
On July 14, 2012, Myers called his first MLB on Fox game with Eric Karros when the New York Mets played against the Atlanta Braves at Turner Field. Myers called MLB games for Fox in 2012 and 2013, before moving back to the studio for the 2014 season.

In 2014, Myers began hosting MLB Whiparound, a nightly show aired weeknights on Fox Sports 1 featuring quick turnaround-highlights, news, and analysis live from Los Angeles.

=== Fox NASCAR (2001–present) ===
Myers, along with Jeff Hammond, Darrell Waltrip, and Michael Waltrip, formerly hosted NASCAR RaceDay, Pizza Hut Prerace Show, and NASCAR Victory Lane during Fox's coverage of NASCAR. His first NASCAR race was the 2001 Daytona 500 where the finish was overshadowed by the death of Dale Earnhardt. Days before the beginning of the 2012 season, his son Christopher was killed in an auto accident. Myers took a bereavement leave and returned to the broadcast two weeks later. For 2019 and 2020, Myers' FOX NASCAR schedule was reduced to just the Daytona 500 only. In 2021, Myers returned to hosting pre-race coverage at the track for the entire portion of Fox's broadcast season, this time being joined by Jeff Gordon and Clint Bowyer.

=== Westminster Kennel Club Dog Show (2017–present) ===
In 2017, Myers was named host for FS1's evening coverage of both nights of the Westminster Kennel Club Dog Show, initially with WKC Director of Communications Gail Miller Bisher, dog show judge Jason Hoke was added in 2018. Myers also in 2017, hosted Fox's annual documentary on the event, Crowned: Inside the Westminster Dog Show.

=== Boxing on Fox (2019) ===
In 2019, Myers began doing play-by-play and hosting for Fox's Premier Boxing Champions broadcasts.

=== Fox Sports: The Home Game (2020) ===
Myers hosts the sports and pop culture game show Fox Sports: The Home Game along with two celebrity guests each week.

=== IndyCar on Fox (2025–) ===
Myers hosted the IndyCar Series on Fox, including the Indianapolis 500 and the season finale with other guests.

== Other appearances ==
Myers has hosted shows and events on the Discovery Channel, Tennis Channel, Military Channel, and Marquee Sports Network and has appeared on Jimmy Kimmel Live! numerous times. Since 2003, Myers also serves as the play-by-play commentator for Tampa Bay Buccaneers preseason telecasts. In 2021 Myers was named as a fill-in announcer for Chicago Cubs telecasts on Marquee Sports.

Myers also made a brief cameo as a news reporter in the 1997 film Volcano.

In 2022, Myers joined the ownership group of a startup sports journalism brand, FILM Media Networks.
