= NASCAR Race Hub =

Former television series

- Genre: News program
- Based on: NASCAR
- Starring: Adam Alexander; Shannon Spake; Kaitlyn Vincie; Larry McReynolds; Josh Sims; Jamie McMurray; Bobby Labonte
- Country of origin: United States
- Original language: English

Production
- Production locations: Fox Network Center; Charlotte, North Carolina
- Running time: 60 minutes 30 minutes

Original release
- Network: Speed (October 12, 2009 – August 15, 2013); Fox Sports 1 (August 19, 2013 – June 11, 2024)
- Release: October 12, 2009 – June 11, 2024

Related
- This Week in NASCAR (2008 – 2009); NASCAR RaceDay; NASCAR Victory Lane

NASCAR Race Hub was a daily NASCAR news program broadcast on Fox Sports 1 Monday through Thursday. Originally broadcast on Speed, the show replaced NASCAR Nation and This Week in NASCAR. NASCAR Race Hub premiered on October 12, 2009, as a 30-minute show, but was extended to 60 minutes in the following years. The show was again shortened to 30 minutes after moving to Fox Sports 1 from Speed in August 2013, only to be returned to 60 minutes starting on September 23. On May 8, 2024, reports emerged that Fox Sports had cancelled Race Hub, with its final episode aired on June 11, 2024.

== History ==
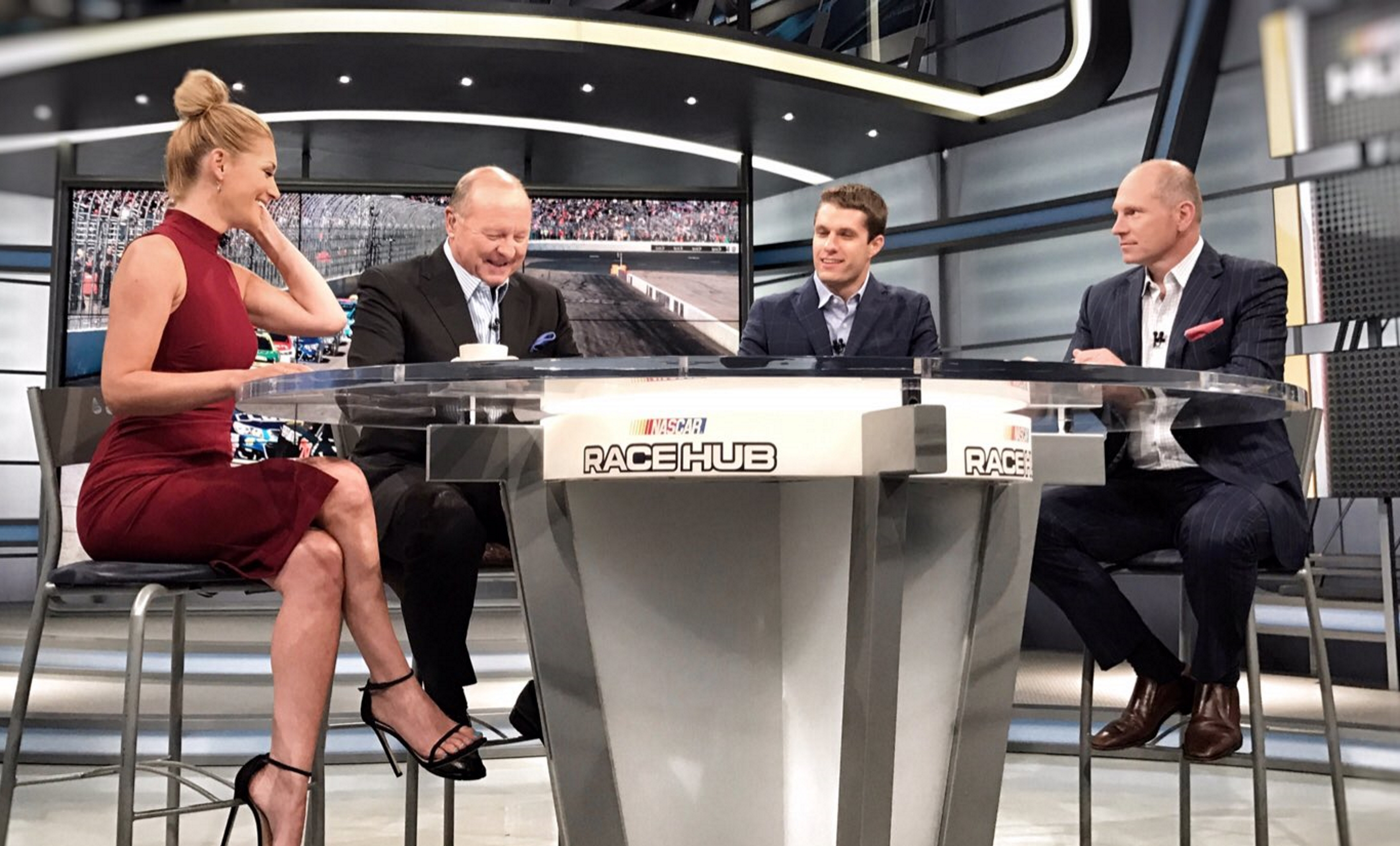
NASCAR Race Hub in 2016

NASCAR Race Hub premiered as a half-hour show, but eventually became an hour-long show. It was shortened back to 30 minutes in August 2013, although the next month it was restored to an hour-long format. It previously aired at 6:00 p.m. ET, as well as at 7:00 p.m. ET Monday through Thursday.

At first the show was hosted by a rotating group which included NASCAR RaceDay and NASCAR Victory Lane host John Roberts, Camping World Truck Series Setup show host and occasional NASCAR Trackside host Krista Voda and Steve Byrnes, but in August 2010, Byrnes was announced as the permanent host of the show and it did not affect his duties as a pit reporter during the NASCAR on FOX races of a given Sprint Cup Series season.

The show breaks down the previous weekend's race and previews the upcoming one, providing analysis and interviews along the way. Jimmy Spencer has a segment on the Tuesday and Thursday editions of the show where he provides commentary and answers viewer emails and tweets. His segments became popular for the various 'awards' he gives drivers and teams such as the crying towel, cigars, strait jackets. Also on Monday, former Miss Sprint Cup, Monica Palumbo along with Danielle Trotta, presented the tweets of the week from NASCAR drivers and crewmen. Trotta contributes segments to the show and does interviews with drivers, crew chiefs and car owners as well as acting as a fill-in host in Byrnes' absence. In 2013, Trotta became co-host, and the show moved from its own studio to share the Speed Center studio.

With the show moving to Fox Sports 1 on August 17, 2013, the show moved to a 4:30 p.m. start time. When the show was re-lengthened, this start time was revised to 4 p.m. It does not always not always air at 4. It sometimes airs at various times, once a day, during the afternoon.

On May 12, 2014, Race Hub moved to its new permanent time to 5pm ET, replacing Crowd Goes Wild, while The Mike Francesa Show took over Race Hub's old time slot. Beginning with the 2015 season, the show swapped timeslots with America's Pregame and resumed its former 6pm timeslot. The show also gained a weekend edition, following the cancellation of NASCAR Live following the 2014 season.

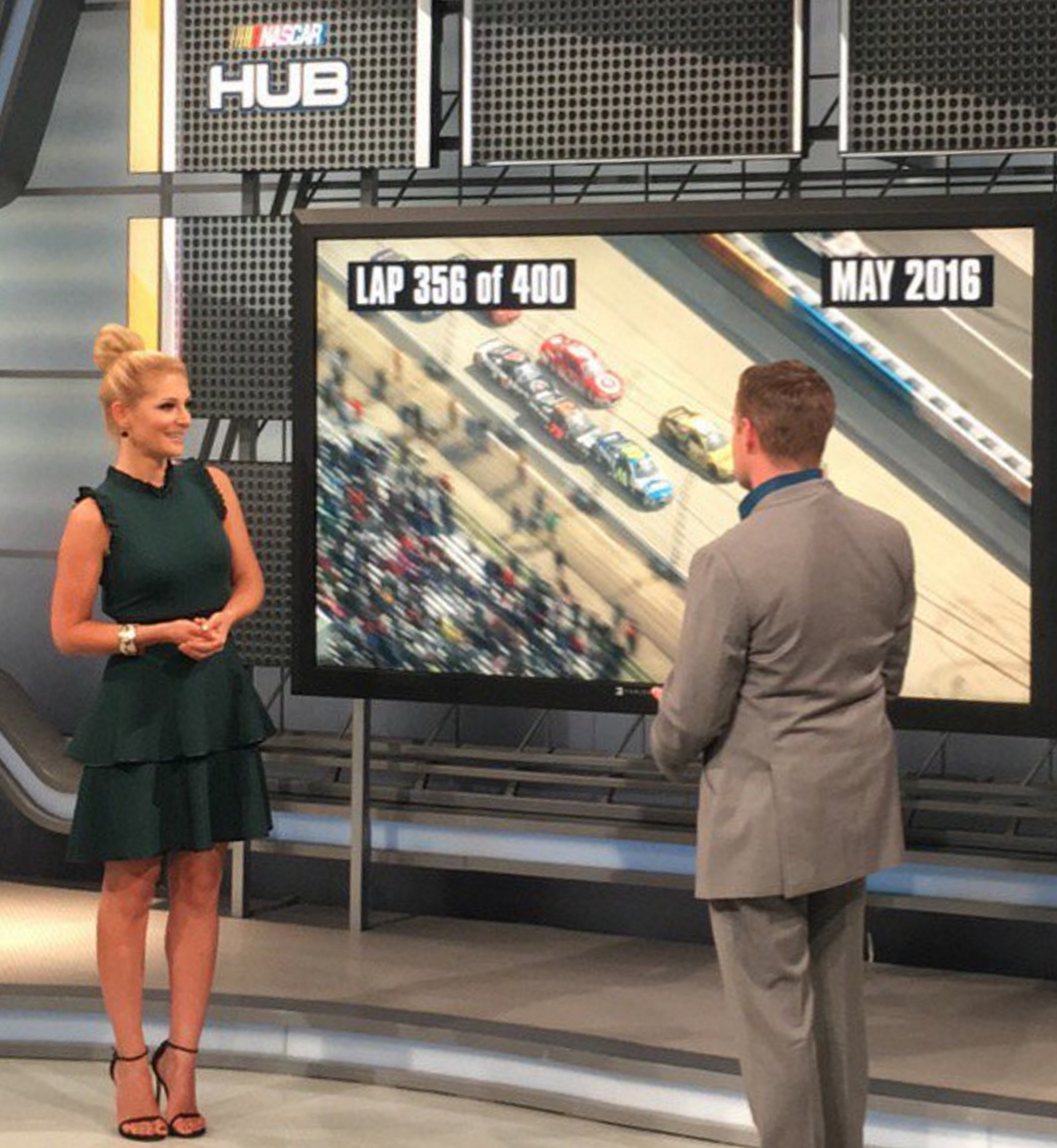
Danielle Trotta and Ricky Stenhouse Jr. on NASCAR Race Hub in 2016

Starting in 2017, Race Hub gained a Spanish-language version to be jointly simulcast on Fox Deportes in the United States and Puerto Rico and Fox Sports 3 for the Spanish-speaking Latin America.

On February 13, 2017, it was announced that Shannon Spake would replace Danielle Trotta as co-host alongside Adam Alexander. Trotta left the show to pursue other opportunities.

On May 8, 2024, it was reported that FS1 had cancelled Race Hub, with its final episode expected to air on June 11.

On June 11, Racehub aired its final episode with a 90-minute special called Racehub: Final Lap. It featured the former hosts and drivers, and they looked back on the show's history and their favorite segments. At the end of the special, all of the people who worked on the show came out, and the closing words were, "Have an awesome night," which was used by former host Steve Byrnes.

=== Radioactive ===
Each Tuesday following a race, radio chatter highlights called Radioactive are shown, featuring driver's in-race radio communications and competitor's reactions during the previous Cup Series race (occasionally, radio highlights from Truck Series are also aired). The Radioactive segments, along with many segments of the show, are uploaded on Fox Sports' YouTube channel around the same time. The Radioactive highlights are also available on NASCAR's YouTube channel.

For 2020 Daytona 500, the Radioactive segment for the race was withheld until June 4, 2020, after Ryan Newman (who had returned to racing since the previous month) was seriously injured in the final lap of the race.

Despite RaceHub formally ending production on June 11, 2024, the Radioactive segment would continue to be produced by FOX and featured on NASCAR's social media platforms.
