= NASCAR K&N Pro Series =

The NASCAR K&N Pro Series refers to former names of two regional stock car racing series owned and operated by the National Association for Stock Car Auto Racing (NASCAR), both now operated under the ARCA Menards Series banner after NASCAR's purchase of Automobile Racing Club of America in 2018:

- ARCA Menards Series East (last known as NASCAR K&N Pro Series East)
- ARCA Menards Series West (last known as NASCAR K&N Pro Series West)
