= Jeff Hammond (NASCAR) =

American auto racing personality (born 1956)

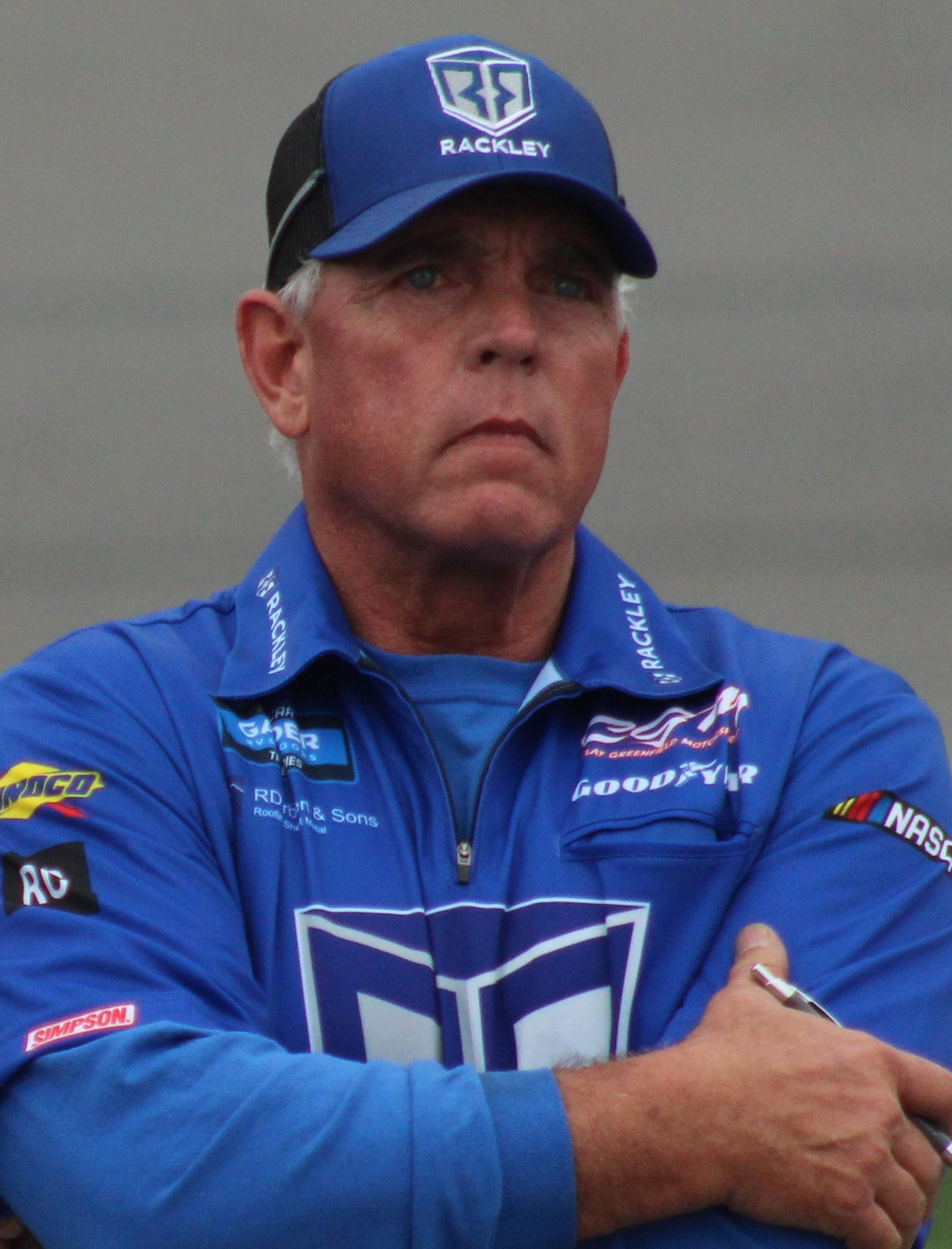
- Hammond at Daytona International Speedway in 2020
- Born: Jeffrey L. Hammond; September 9, 1956 (age 70); Charlotte, North Carolina, U.S.
- Education: East Carolina University
- Occupations: Television sportscaster NASCAR crew chief
- Years active: 2001–present (broadcasting); 1982–2000, 2020, 2024 (crew chief)
- Employer(s): Fox NASCAR; Freedom Racing Enterprises
- Known for: Two-time NASCAR Winston Cup Series champion crew chief

Jeffrey L. Hammond (born September 9, 1956) is an American NASCAR personality and crew chief. Currently, he is a commentator for NASCAR's coverage on Fox Sports. He is also referred to as Hollywood Hammond by his Fox colleague Darrell Waltrip. He is an alumnus of East Carolina University.

In addition to his work at Fox, Hammond also serves as the general manager and crew chief in the NASCAR Craftsman Truck Series for Freedom Racing Enterprises. He formerly was a co-owner (along with business executive Tom DeLoach) of Red Horse Racing, a Truck Series racing team which operated from 2005 to 2017.

== Background ==
While attending high school at North Mecklenburg High School in Charlotte, North Carolina, he was named a 1973–74 High School Prep Football All-American as a cornerback. He played college football at East Carolina University for Pat Dye until he suffered a career-ending injury in 1975.

== Racing career ==
Hammond's NASCAR career began in 1974 as a tire changer for Walter Ballard, but soon moved to the jackman position. He served on the crew for three championship seasons between Cale Yarborough and Darrell Waltrip. In 1982, Hammond was promoted to the crew chief position at Junior Johnson Motorsports when Waltrip won his second consecutive championship. He and Waltrip became the top driver-crew chief combination in NASCAR, winning 43 races during the 1980s including the 1985 Winston Cup championship. Hammond followed Waltrip to Hendrick Motorsports, where they won the 1989 Daytona 500.

In 1991, Waltrip and Hammond formed Darrell Waltrip Motorsports, where the combination clicked again, but in mid-1992, Hammond left after a win at Pocono Raceway when SABCO Racing owner Felix Sabates named him to work with Kenny Wallace for the 1993 season. Hammond teamed up again with Waltrip in 1996, but the two were unable to recapture the magic of the 1980s. In 1998, Hammond joined Roush Racing as crew chief for Chad Little. The combination was an immediate success. Despite failing to qualify for the spring race at Atlanta Motor Speedway, Little finished second at the Texas 500 and had a career high 15th place in the championship standings. Hammond stayed with Roush Racing until the end of the 2000 season; this included a stint where he was crew chief for Kurt Busch for the first six races, before leaving after he was hired to work at Fox Sports.

In 2020, Hammond joined Clay Greenfield Motorsports as the No. 68's crew chief.

In 2024, Hammond would join the newly formed Freedom Racing Enterprises as its general manager. He would also serve as crew chief following the departure of Greg Ely after Las Vegas.

Hammond has worked with four NASCAR champions in his career: Cale Yarborough (a mechanic), Darrell Waltrip (a crew chief for two of the three), Terry Labonte (1987 for a few races), and Kurt Busch (2000 in his first races).

== Broadcasting career ==
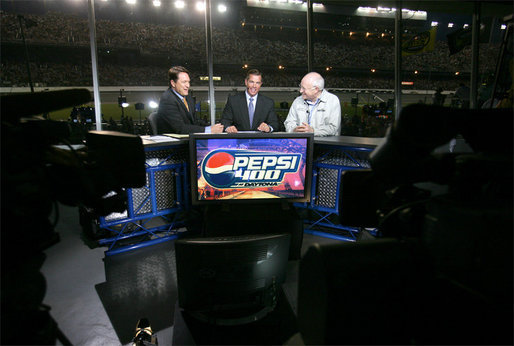
Hammond (center) with Chris Myers and Dick Cheney on the Fox set in 2006

In 2001, Hammond and Waltrip were reunited, this time as broadcasters for Fox Sports' coverage of NASCAR. Hammond works for Fox Sports 1 as an analyst for NASCAR Race Hub.

Hammond served as an analyst for Fox NASCAR Sunday, the network's prerace show, alongside Chris Myers and Darrell Waltrip from 2001 to 2011. In 2012, he covered stories on pit road as they developed throughout the race for FOX NASCAR, becoming the first former crew chief to serve in that capacity for network television's NASCAR coverage. In addition, Hammond offered his expertise for years as an analyst for FOX Sports 1's NASCAR Sprint Cup Series and NASCAR Xfinity Series practice and qualifying coverage. He also co-hosted the Budweiser duel at Daytona and the NASCAR Sprint All-Star Race several times for FOX Sports 1.

When Fox unveiled a new mobile studio for NASCAR pre-race broadcasts, Darrell Waltrip remarked "There's Hollywood Hammond inside the Hollywood Hotel," and the nickname stuck with the broadcast studio where he and Chris Myers broadcast the pre-race shows until 2012 when he was replaced by Michael Waltrip. In 2005, he became an owner of Red Horse Racing's Craftsman Truck program, where they have won fifteen races.

Hammond has also broadcast pro wrestling events for Total Nonstop Action Wrestling, during the promotion's early period on national television when its Impact weekly show was broadcast on Fox Sports Net while also doing commentary for various pay-per-view events. Hammond hosted an interview segment known as the "Six Points of Impact!". He has also wrestled in TNA and in Hermie Sadler's United Wrestling Federation in April 2006.

Hammond contributes a regular online column on Foxsports.com where fans can post write-in questions, one of which he will answer in every column.
