= Jeff Gordon in popular culture =

American stock car racer and media celebrity

Former American stock car racing driver Jeff Gordon has become an iconic figure in popular culture. While Gordon became a household name among NASCAR fans for his driving career in the Cup Series, he has introduced the sport to a wider audience, largely through the media of the United States.

== Topics ==
=== Art ===
Throughout his NASCAR Cup Series career, Gordon had a partnership with artist Sam Bass. They met in 1992, when DuPont chose a rainbow design Bass created to become Gordon's primary paint scheme. Bass designed several paint schemes for Gordon, including fantasy designs used on die-cast. Bass also worked on the designs of the No. 24 team's racing suits and haulers. Bass' first painting of Gordon, Rookie Sensation!, was made in 1993.

Gordon has been featured in several paintings by Garry Hill, notably Brickyard Thunder, based on Gordon's victory in the 1994 Brickyard 400. Gordon is included in some of Hill's All-Star Race painting series, which Hill began in 1987. Hill has also designed cover art for race programs. Gordon is listed as a collector of Hill's work on the artist's website.

Gordon's colorful No. 24 DuPont Chevrolet Monte Carlo is featured in several paintings by Marc Lacourciere.

Gordon is the subject of a 1998 painting by LeRoy Neiman.

From 1999 to 2012, designer Aaron Decarlo worked with Gordon on special paint schemes and program cars.

In 2007, Daytona International Speedway officials hired a local sand sculptor to create a NASCAR-themed depiction of Mount Rushmore in the fanzone, featuring the faces of Dale Earnhardt Jr.; Gordon; Jimmie Johnson; and Tony Stewart. In 2008, NASCAR Illustrated recruited Brooklyn-based artist Jim Cooke to create a Hendrick Motorsports-themed illustration of Mount Rushmore for the magazine's October issue. The cover art features the faces of HMS' 2009 driver lineup: Gordon; Johnson; Earnhardt Jr.; and Mark Martin.

Bill Patterson, who has been live painting races at Phoenix Raceway since 2006, created two pieces based on Gordon's 2007 victory at the track: his late race pass on Tony Stewart and his victory lap tribute to Dale Earnhardt.

Tuscaloosa, Alabama-based artist Rick Rush created a painting titled Finishing Strong (2008), which was presented to the United States Sports Academy's American Sport Art Museum & Archives in 2017. The piece features the vehicles of Johnson; Gordon; and Earnhardt Jr.

A floral version of Gordon's rainbow No. 24 car–along with Richard Petty's blue No. 43 and Dale Earnhardt's black No. 3–will be featured in a NASCAR-themed float at the 134th Rose Parade on January 2, 2023 in Pasadena, California. Titled "Always Forward", and described as a nod to its parade's theme–"Turning the Corner", the display will be used to celebrate NASCAR's 75th anniversary and promote the 2nd running of the Busch Light Clash at The Coliseum on February 5, 2023.

=== Filmography ===
Gordon has made cameo appearances as both himself and fictional characters in films and television series.

==== Film ====
When asked about plans to star in a film in 2001, Gordon responded "Heck no." (Note: Gordon made the comment during a fan Q&A held at Daytona USA on June 4, 2001, while participating in a media tour to promote the upcoming Pepsi 400.) He was reportedly attached to Race Jam, a cancelled film which would have been a NASCAR-themed spin-off to Space Jam. Gordon ultimately signed with Warner Bros. and made his feature film debut through a cameo appearance in Looney Tunes: Back in Action (2003). He shot his Back in Action scene in Las Vegas a day after his victory at Kansas Speedway in 2002. His #24 Dupont Chevrolet Monte Carlo also makes an appearance in the film where it gets stolen by Yosemite Sam, Nasty Canasta, and Cottontail Smith in an attempt to chase down Damian Drake, Kate Houghton, Bugs Bunny, and Daffy Duck who have recently won a playing card. Gordon made an uncredited cameo appearance in Taxi (2004), in which his girlfriend at the time Ingrid Vandebosch played a bank robber, while he appears in the end of the film, shown challenging the protagonist Belle Williams to a race.

Gordon was interested in a role for the film Talladega Nights (2006), but declined an offer to participate due to concerns from his sponsors. However, Gordon invited actor Will Ferrell, who plays Ricky Bobby in the film, to accept his 11th-place reward at the 2005 Nextel Cup Series banquet at Waldorf Astoria New York, as Gordon was in Paris to compete in that year's Race of Champions.

Gordon voices the Cars character Jeff Gorvette in Cars 2 (2011) and Cars 3 (2017). Based on the Chevrolet Corvette C6.R, Gorvette is a primarily yellow racing car with the stars and stripes of the American flag painted on his sides. Like his voice actor, Gorvette uses the No. 24 in competition. Pixar has called Gordon a major inspiration for Cars 3. Gordon and his former crew chief Ray Evernham also served as story consultants for Cars 3.

Title	Year	Role	Notes	Ref.
Looney Tunes: Back in Action	2003	Himself	Cameo	
Taxi	2004	Himself	Uncredited cameo	
Herbie: Fully Loaded	2005	Himself	Cameo	
Cars 2	2011	Jeff Gorvette (Note: While Gordon voices the character in the U.S. release, international versions of the film replaced his role with other racing drivers better known in their respective regions; despite this, Jeff Gorvette still appears in a non-speaking role as a competitor in all regional releases.)	Voice role	
Cars 3	2017	Jeff Gorvette	Voice role	
Logan Lucky	2017	Himself	Cameo	

==== Television ====
As a child racer, Gordon was featured in segments on Kids Are People Too and PM Magazine, and was the subject of an episode for a series titled Super Kids. Gordon was featured on ESPN's SpeedWeek in 1985, making his first appearance on the network at age thirteen. He subsequently became a media sensation through the network's Thursday Night Thunder program, using his appearances in Thunder races to establish a national following.

Title	Year	Role	Network	Notes	Ref.
A Current Affair	1995	Himself (guest)	Syndicated		
Late Show with David Letterman	1995–2008	Himself (guest)	CBS	Frequent appearances as guest	(Note: Gordon made his debut on the show in 1995, shortly after winning his first Cup championship. He was subsequently interviewed by Letterman in 1996, 1997, 1998, and 2001. He participated in the Late Show Top Ten List after his 1999 Daytona 500 victory, and with the NASCAR Chase fields of 2006, 2007, and 2008; it was renamed the Top Twelve List for the latter two years, when the Chase field expanded from ten to twelve drivers.)
Good Morning America	1995–2016	Himself (guest)	ABC	Frequent appearances as guest	
Jeff Gordon Wide Open	1996	Himself	TNN	Television special	
The Rosie O'Donnell Show	1996	Himself (guest)	Syndicated		
The Crier Report	1997	Himself (guest)	Fox News		
Extra	1997–2003	Himself (guest)	Syndicated		
Million Dollar Date with Jeff Gordon	1997	Himself (host)	TNN	Television special in regards to his attempt to win the small slam bonus for winning three of the sport's four majors.	
Steel Chariots	1997	Himself	FOX	Television film	
The Tonight Show with Jay Leno	1997–2011	Himself (guest)	NBC	Frequent appearances as guest	(Note: Gordon made appearances on the program in 1997, 2004, twice in 2005, and in 2011.)
Charlie Rose	1997	Himself (guest)	PBS	Episode: "Jeff Gordon; Jim Cramer; Sheryl Crow"	
Live	1997–2016	Himself (co-host and guest)	Syndicated	10 episodes as co-host; other guest appearances	(Note: Gordon co-hosted the January 15, 2001 episode with Regis Philbin, prior to the NASCAR season. He made nine subsequent co-hosting appearances alongside Kelly Ripa. He has also appeared as a guest on the program with regular hosts Philbin and Kathie Lee Gifford; Philbin and Ripa; Ripa and Michael Strahan; and Ripa (with guest co-host Ciara).)
Tiger and Friends	1997	Himself (participant)	CBS	Golf match featuring Tiger Woods, Gordon, Ken Griffey Jr. and Chris O'Donnell	
Real Sports with Bryant Gumbel	1998–1999	Himself (guest)	HBO		
The Life and Times of NASCAR's Founding Family, Part II	1998	Himself	TNN	Documentary about the France family	
NASCAR: 50 Years on the Fast Track with Brooks & Dunn	1998	Himself	CBS	Television special about the 50th anniversary of NASCAR; starring Brooks & Dunn	
Arliss	1998	Himself	HBO	Episode: "Where Do Clients Come From?"	
Spin City	1998	Himself	ABC	Episode: "The Kidney's All Right"	
Today	1998–2011	Himself (guest)	NBC	Frequent appearances as guest	
Entertainment Tonight	1999	Himself (guest)	Syndicated		
Behind Closed Doors	1999	Himself (guest)	ABC	Joan Lunden follows Gordon around at Atlanta Motor Speedway	
NASCAR Behind the Scenes	1999	Himself (host)	NBC	Television special	
Larry King Live	2001–2005	Himself (guest)	CNN	4 episodes	(Note: Gordon appeared on the March 19, 2001 episode with Richard Petty and Darrell Waltrip. He was the sole guest on the May 22, 2001 episode. Gordon appeared on the February 23, 2004 episode with Dale Earnhardt Jr. He appeared on the August 15, 2005 episode with Rusty Wallace, Kyle Petty and Kasey Kahne; they were interviewed by guest host Bob Costas.)
Who Wants to Be a Millionaire	2001	Himself (contestant)	ABC	Episode: "Sports Superstars"	
The Drew Carey Show	2001	Himself	ABC	Episode: "Mr. Laffon's Wild Ride"	
Fox NFL	2002	Himself (guest)	FOX	In the early years of Fox NASCAR, the reigning Cup champion and lead analyst Darrell Waltrip appeared at the NFC Championship Game, or in years Fox had the Super Bowl, on the studio show to promote the upcoming season. Gordon, as the reigning Cup champion, was at Super Bowl XXXVI in that role.	
CNN Live Today	2002	Himself (guest)	CNN		
Unscripted with Chris Connelly	2002	Himself (guest)	ESPN		
Inside the NBA	2002–2003	Himself (guest)	TNT	TNT was a broadcast partner of NASCAR at the time.	
Wheel of Fortune	2002–2003	Himself (guest)	Syndicated	Gordon stars in taped appearances for NASCAR week	
Mohr Sports	2002	Himself (guest)	ESPN	Jay Mohr interviews Gordon	
The Wayne Brady Show	2002	Himself (guest)	Syndicated		
Saturday Night Live	2003	Himself (host); five sketches; (Note: Robert Forgy (Brian Fellow's Safari Planet), Captain Jack Kelly (Career Day), Waiter (Star Dates), Roger (Gary's Fish Tanks), and Rickye Funke (The Terrye Funck Show).)	NBC	Episode: "Jeff Gordon/Avril Lavigne" (Season 28, Episode 9)	
Gordon/Montoya Tradin' Paint	2003	Himself (participant)	SPEED	Gordon and F1 driver Juan Pablo Montoya swap rides at Indianapolis Motor Speedway	
Sidewalks Entertainment	2003	Himself (guest)	Syndicated	Episode: "Jeff Gordon & YoungBloodZ"	
WindTunnel with Dave Despain	2003–2013	Himself (co-host and guest)	SPEED	Frequent appearances as co-host or guest	(Note: Gordon made his first appearance in 2003, and appeared on the last episode of the program in 2013; Dave Despain called Gordon "his favorite interview." A comparison of Gordon and Dale Earnhardt is the subject of a 2007 television special titled "Wonderboy or The Intimidator ...Who's Better?")
The News with Brian Williams	2003	Himself (guest)	CNBC	Brian Williams interviews Gordon to discuss his new memoir	
Last Call with Carson Daly	2003	Himself (guest)	CBS		
SportsCentury	2004	Himself	ESPN Classic	Episode: "Jeff Gordon"	
The Late Late Show with Craig Kilborn	2004	Himself (guest)	CBS	1 episode	
Miss USA 2004	2004	Himself (judge)	NBC		
Jimmy Kimmel Live!	2004–2005	Himself (guest)	ABC	2 episodes	
On Air with Ryan Seacrest	2004	Himself (guest)	Syndicated	1 episode	
Celebrity Poker Showdown	2004	Himself (contestant)	Bravo	Third tournament	
Dr. Phil	2004	Himself (guest)	Syndicated	Gordon and Phil McGraw participate in the Richard Petty Driving Experience at Las Vegas Motor Speedway	
Power Lunch	2005	Himself (guest)	CNBC		
The Late Late Show with Craig Ferguson	2005	Himself (guest)	CBS	1 episode	
The Tony Danza Show	2005–2006	Himself (guest)	Syndicated	2 episodes	(Note: Gordon was scheduled to appear on the February 10, 2006 episode, but his appearance was rescheduled to February 17.)
Life & Style	2005	Himself (guest)	Syndicated	1 episode	
The Ellen DeGeneres Show	2005–2011	Himself (guest)	Syndicated	2 episodes	
60 Minutes	2005	Himself (guest)	CBS	NASCAR Family segment	
Fox & Friends	2006–2015	Himself (guest)	Fox News		
CMI: The Chris Myers Interview	2006	Himself (guest)	FSN	Chris Myers interviews Gordon	
American Morning	2006–2010	Himself (guest)	CNN		
DaySide	2006	Himself (guest)	Fox News		
Monday Night Football	2006–2007	Himself (guest)	ESPN	2 games	(Note: Gordon was a featured guest in the booth during the November 2006 Buccaneers–Panthers game. Gordon and Jimmie Johnson were interviewed by Stuart Scott at halftime via satellite during the November 2007 49ers–Seahawks game.)
World's Greatest Sports Bloopers	2007	Himself (co-host)	ABC	Primetime special co-hosted by Gordon and Summer Sanders	
Conversations with Carlos Watson	2007	Himself (guest)	Hearst-Argyle	Carlos Watson interviews Gordon	
Tradin' Paint	2007	Himself (guest)	SPEED		
Unique Whips	2007	Himself (guest)	SPEED	Episode: "Flash Gordon"	
24 x 24: Wide Open with Jeff Gordon	2007	Himself	TNT	Documentary film that premiered on television before the 2007 Pepsi 400	
Rachael Ray	2009–2015	Himself (guest)	Syndicated	2 episodes	(Note: Gordon appeared on the show in 2009 with his mother, Carol Bickford. He made his second appearance on the program in 2015.)
Speed Racer: The Next Generation	2009	Turbo McAllister (voice role)	Nicktoons	Episode: "The Secrets of the Engine: Part 3"	
Together: The Hendrick Motorsports Story	2009	Himself	ABC	Documentary celebrating the twenty-fifth anniversary of Hendrick Motorsports	
NASCAR Race Hub	2009–present	Himself (guest and analyst)	SPEED; FS1	Frequent appearances as guest or analyst	(Note: The show premiered in 2009, and Gordon has made several appearances since then; he made his analyst debut on the program in 2016. Gordon appeared in a 2017 documentary about the 1996 NASCAR Thunder Special Suzuka titled Made in Japan.)
Sesame Street	2009	Himself (guest)	PBS	Episode 4203 (Season 40)	
Extreme Makeover: Home Edition	2010	Himself (guest)	ABC	Episode: "The Suggs Family"	(Note: Gordon joined host Ty Pennington and his team to help build a new home for the Suggs family in Loris, South Carolina. A resident of nearby Charlotte, North Carolina, Gordon agreed to help the family out after being approached by show organizers. Filming for this episode began on January 11, 2010 and lasted seven days. Gordon briefly left the project for two days to attend the 2010 NASCAR Preseason Thunder Fan Fest at Daytona International Speedway, where he offered the Suggs a ride-along on the track during their Florida vacation. The Bella Twins, Big Show and R-Truth also participated in the project on days when Gordon was absent. Gordon returned to South Carolina on January 17 to complete the project. The episode aired on April 11.)
2010 Country Music Association Awards	2010	Brad Paisley; himself (presenter)	ABC		
Squawk Box	2010	Himself (guest)	CNBC	Gordon discusses his partnership with AARP and the Drive to End Hunger campaign	
Late Night with Jimmy Fallon	2011	Himself (guest)	NBC	1 episode	
Top Gear	2012	Himself (guest)	BBC Two (Note: This episode premiered on British television on February 5, 2012. It premiered on BBC America in the United States on April 30, 2012.)	Series 18, Episode 2	
Inside NASCAR	2012	Himself (guest)	Showtime		
Beyond 200: The Hendrick Motorsports Story	2012	Himself	SPEED	Documentary celebrating Hendrick Motorsports' 200 victories	
I Get That a Lot	2013	Himself	CBS	Gordon works at AutoZone and attempts to sell Quaker State to customers (a promotion by Hendrick and then-sponsor Shell)	
Fashion Police	2013	Himself (guest)	E!	1 episode	
Unguarded with Rachel Nichols	2014	Himself (guest)	CNN	Rachel Nichols interviews Gordon	
AmeriCarna	2015	Himself (guest)	Velocity	Gordon and Ray Evernham restore the GEM Pepsi Chevy for a Barrett-Jackson auction	
I Am Dale Earnhardt	2015	Himself	Spike	Documentary about Dale Earnhardt	
American Idol	2015	Himself	FOX	Season 14, Episode 21	(Note: Gordon invited the top eleven finalists to perform "The Star-Spangled Banner" prior to the running of the 2015 Auto Club 400 at Auto Club Speedway.)
Fox NASCAR	2015–2022	Himself (analyst)	FOX; FS1	3 Xfinity events in 2015 as guest analyst; full-time Cup analyst from 2016 to 2021; 1 Cup event in 2022 as guest analyst	
Knock Knock Live	2015	Himself	FOX	Gordon surprises superfan Chad in Indianapolis	
Penn Zero: Part-Time Hero	2015	Wacky Bustgutty (voice role)	Disney XD	Episode: "Chuckle City 500"	
The Soup	2015	Himself (guest)	E!	Episode: "The Soup Invades NASCAR"	
The Tonight Show Starring Jimmy Fallon	2015	Himself (guest)	NBC	Gordon participates in the Tonight Show 500 in Rockefeller Plaza	
Jeff Gordon's Daytona 500 Kickoff Celebration	2016	Himself (host)	FOX	Television special that aired the night before the 2016 Daytona 500	
Fox Extra	2016	Himself (guest)	Fox News	Gordon discusses the future of NASCAR with Dagen McDowell	
The Insider	2016	Himself (guest)	Syndicated	Ingrid Vandebosch interviews Gordon as part of the Couples Confidential segment	
Mickey and the Roadster Racers	2017–2019	Gordon Gear (voice role)	Disney Junior; Disney Channel	3 episodes (Note: “Abra-ka-Goof!”, “Pit Stop and Go!” and “Mickey's Spring Grand Prix”.)	
Refuse to Lose	2017	Himself	FS1	Television special about the 1997 Daytona 500	
22nd Annual Sohn Investment Conference	2017	Himself (guest speaker)	CNBC	Gordon discusses the business of NASCAR, technology and philanthropy with Kelly Evans	
Undeniable with Joe Buck	2017	Himself (guest)	Audience	Episode: "Jeff Gordon" (Season 4, Episode 10)	
Glory Road	2018	Himself (guest)	NBCSN	Episode: "Blacker" (Season 1, Episode 1)	(Note: In the series premiere, Gordon joins host Ray Evernham to discuss the racecar nicknamed Blacker, which Gordon drove to twelve victories and played a role in two of his championships.)
Unrivaled: Earnhardt vs. Gordon	2019	Himself (executive producer)	FS1	Documentary film that premiered on television after the Daytona 500 qualifying races.	
Fox Sports: The Home Game	2020	Himself (contestant)	FS1	Gordon competes against Brady Quinn in a game show hosted by Chris Myers	
Jay Leno's Garage	2021	Himself (guest)	CNBC	Episode: "Punch It" (Season 6, Episode 7)	
Dinner Drive with Kyle Petty	2022	Himself (guest)	Circle	1 episode	
Race for the Championship	2022	Himself	USA Network	3 episodes	(Note: Gordon is featured in the first two episodes in his role as the vice chairman for Hendrick Motorsports. Archived footage of Gordon's victory in the 1994 Coca-Cola 600 is featured in the fifth episode.)
Lego Masters	2022	Himself (guest)	FOX	1 episode	

==== Home video ====
Title	Year	Role	Notes	Ref.
Jeff Gordon: Triumph of a Dream	1996	Himself	Video diary taped by Jeff and Brooke Gordon during the 1995 season	
Jeff Gordon's One in a Million	1998	Himself	Video recap of Gordon's 1997 season	
Speed, Guts, & Glory	2006	Himself (narrator)	Bonus DVD featured alongside Joe Garner's book of the same name	

==== Music videos ====
Title	Year	Role	Notes	Ref.
"Boys Have At It" (Remix) (by DJ Steve Porter)	2010	Himself (archive footage)	Autotuned remarks from Gordon's post-race interview at the 2010 Aaron's 499	(Note: The video was created for ESPN and first aired in November 2010 to promote the upcoming Ford 400.)
"Old Alabama" (by Brad Paisley featuring Alabama)	2011	Himself	Cameo	(Note: The video was filmed in Charlotte, North Carolina and features cameo appearances from Gordon, Rick Hendrick, and Darrell Waltrip.)

==== Web ====
Title	Year	Role	Notes	Ref.
Harlem Shake (Jeff Gordon Edition)	2013	Himself	30-second video produced by Gifted Youth	
Pepsi Max & Jeff Gordon Present: Test Drive	2013	Himself (Note: In Test Drive, Gordon disguises himself as a customer named Mike.)	Short film produced by Gifted Youth	
The Crossing	2013	Himself	Web series produced by NASCAR Productions; featuring actor Ron Howard	
Pepsi Max & Jeff Gordon Present: Test Drive 2	2014	Himself (Note: In Test Drive 2, Gordon disguises himself as an ex-convict cab driver.)	Short film produced by Gifted Youth	
Larry King Now	2014	Himself (guest)	Larry King interviews Gordon at Auto Club Speedway	
Road to Race Day	2017	Himself	Documentary series about Hendrick Motorsports' 2016 season	
Carpool Karaoke: The Series	2017	Himself (guest)	Gordon drives Michael Strahan around as they sing along to four songs	

==== Advertising ====
Gordon has appeared in advertising through various forms of media, including print; television; and online. His image has been featured on beverage cans and bottles, billboards, cereal boxes, corn chip bags, toothpaste tubes, and vending machines. He has been called one of NASCAR's most marketable drivers.

Beginning with the 1997 season, Gordon represented PepsiCo as a spokesperson. He has appeared in television spots for Fritos. In 2011, Gordon worked with Pepsi Max to create the Road Trip to the Race Track video as a promotion prior to the Coke Zero 400.

Gordon appeared in an ad for the Got Milk? campaign in 1997, sporting the milk mustache. The photo shoot took place in New York with portrait photographer Annie Leibovitz. Gordon was the first racing driver to be featured in the campaign.

He has also appeared in ads for DuPont, Chevrolet, Coca-Cola, DieHard, Nutmeg Mills, Papa John's Pizza, Quaker State, Edy's, Ray-Ban, Foster Grant, TNT, Nextel, Sprint, USTA, Elizabeth Arden's Halston Z-14, Tylenol, Siegfried & Roy Present Darren Romeo: The Voice of Magic, Famous Dave's, AARP, Team Umizoomi on Nick Jr., NAPA, Fox Sports, and Fox Sports 1.

=== Cultural references ===
==== Execution of Joseph Mitchell Parsons ====
On October 15, 1999, Joseph Mitchell Parsons was executed in Utah for the murder of Richard Lynn Ernest. Prior to his death by lethal injection, Parsons' final words were: "Love to my family and friends. And Woody, the rainbow warrior rules. Thank you."

According to eight of Parsons' fellow death row inmates, the "rainbow warrior" comment was a reference to the nickname given to the entire No. 24 pit crew, whose car carried a rainbow paint scheme at the time. Parsons' closest inmate, Doug "Woody" Lovell, revealed that the two bet their candy bars on NASCAR races; Parsons always bet on Gordon. Parsons also reportedly had a picture of Gordon in his cell.

==== Homages ====
- While addressing the Gridiron Club Dinner in 2003, Senator John Edwards of North Carolina, then a potential candidate for the 2004 Democratic Party presidential primaries, joked that his "dream Cabinet" would include Gordon as the Secretary of Transportation.

Bill Clinton
(@BillClinton)
tweeted:

I'm excited to watch @JeffGordonWeb's last thrilling ride tomorrow. He’s a great friend to me and to the @ClintonFdn. Best of luck #Team24!

21 Nov 2015

- Former President Bill Clinton mentioned Gordon via Twitter in 2015, calling him "a great friend to me and to the Clinton Foundation." Clinton wrote the tweet in honor of Gordon's final scheduled NASCAR start.

==== Media ====
===== Comedy and music =====
- Comedian and country artist Tim Wilson wrote and recorded NASCAR-themed parody songs, most notably "Dale Darrell Waltrip Richard Petty Rusty Awesome Bill Irvin Gordon Earnhardt Smith...Johnson Jr." (also known as "The NASCAR Song"), originally featured on the album Tuned Up (1997) and later on the greatest hits album Certified Aluminum: His Greatest Recycled Hits, Vol. 1 (2002). Another parody is "The Jeff Gordon Song" (also known as "Jeff Gordon's Gay"), which debuted on The Bob & Tom Show and later saw a release on Certified Aluminum.
- Comedian Jeff Foxworthy jokes about Gordon's elocution in his stand-up routine "Jeff Gordon Enunciates", featured on the album Big Funny (2000).
- Hip hop artist Nelly raps "I drive fastly, call me Jeff Gord-on, in the black SS with the naviga-tion" in the song "E.I.", featured on the album Country Grammar (2000).
- Hip hop artist Jay-Z raps "It's Hov tradition, Jeff Gordon of rap / I'm back to claim pole position, holla at ya boy" in his feature on the Kanye West song "Never Let Me Down", featured on West's debut album The College Dropout (2004).
- Country music parodist Cledus T. Judd sings "Just watchin' Jeff Gordon plow up a wall, puts a smile on Dale Jr.'s face" in the song "I Love NASCAR", featured on the album Bipolar and Proud (2004).
- Hip hop artist Kanye West raps "Do the dishes, I'm about to hit that Jeff Gordon" in his "Power" remix (2010).
- Hip hop artist Kevin McCall raps "Haters better stay in they lane, I'm Jeff Gordon" in his feature on the Chris Brown song "Fuck Um All", featured on Brown's mixtape In My Zone 2 (2010).
- Hip hop artist Mayne Mannish of The Team raps "I'm Jeff Gordon in his heyday, Ridin' like Tony Stewart smashing through a two-way" in The Team's feature on the Clyde Carson song "Slow Down", featured on Carson's mixtape S.T.S.A. (Something To Speak About) (2012).
- Hip hop artist Shaboozey raps about being "Young Jeff Gordon" in the song "Jeff Gordon" (2014).
- Hip hop artist Young Sizzle has a song titled "Jeff Gordon" (2016).
- Hip hop artist Lil Yachty raps "Call me Jeff Gordon" in his feature on the Yung Bans song "Jeff Gordon" (2016). There is a version exclusively with Lil Yachty's vocals titled "Nascar" (2016).

===== Film and television =====
- In the Aqua Teen Hunger Force episode "Kidney Car" (2003), Carl Brutananadilewski says to Meatwad, "Ease off the pedal there, Jeff Gordon."
- In the Danny Phantom episode "What You Want" (2004), during the flying car scene, Danny Phantom yells at the driver, "Hey, slow down, Jeff Gordon!".
- In the film Couples Retreat (2009), Jason Smith (portrayed by Jason Bateman) tells Dave (portrayed by Vince Vaughn), "If Jeff Gordon told you that your oil was low, you might want to think about changing it."

=== Fictional portrayals ===
- The King of the Hill episode "Life in the Fast Lane, Bobby's Saga" (1998) portrays Gordon less than favorably, as he screams "Daddy!" in a nasal tone when his car spins out and hits the wall, alluding to earlier comments about how the main cast do not care for him because his father pulled strings to get him the car.
- The Celebrity Deathmatch episode "Sex, Lugs and Rock 'n' Roll" (2000) pits Gordon and Dale Earnhardt against each other in a "demolition derby to the death." Show creator Eric Fogel revealed in a May 2011 IAmA that the Earnhardt–Gordon match was among his favorites.
- The South Park episode "Poor and Stupid" (2010) lampoons Gordon, along with fellow drivers Dale Earnhardt Jr., Jimmie Johnson, Danica Patrick, Tony Stewart, and Matt Kenseth. (Note: In this clip of the episode, the six drivers are mocked by Eric Cartman during a press conference.) Commenting on the episode, Gordon believed that while the episode was making fun of NASCAR, it managed to bring the sport good publicity.
- In a March 2015 Tank McNamara comic strip written and illustrated by cartoonist Bill Hinds, Gordon is portrayed as a private driver for the title character.
- In a live episode of The Adventure Zone, a podcast created by Griffin, Justin, Travis, and Clint McElroy, Jeff Gordon appears pulling a decommissioned sleigh formerly owned by Santa Claus with his teeth. He is shown to be able to fly, have superhuman strength, and eat light and turn it into power. Later in the episode, he becomes the new Santa after the other characters murder the previous Santa Claus, at which point he is renamed "Seff Cordon." As Santa, he gives all the children of earth signed copies of The Bible.

=== Magazines ===
Gordon has appeared on the cover of several magazines, including: NASCAR Illustrated, TV Guide, (Note: Gordon appeared on the cover five times in the 1990s, and five times in the 2000s.) Sports Illustrated, ESPN The Magazine, Inland Empire Magazine, Sporting News, Racing Milestones, Bluff, WebMD the Magazine, Pain Pathways, and Autoweek.

=== Video games ===
Gordon is the feature driver of the video game Jeff Gordon XS Racing, and is a guide for gamers to progress through the game, and also is an opponent in a later duel in the game. Gordon has appeared on the covers of the EA Sports NASCAR series games NASCAR 98 and NASCAR Thunder 2002, while Gordon and Hendrick Motorsports teammate Jimmie Johnson are on the cover of NASCAR 06: Total Team Control, highlighting Team Control, the main addition of the game; he also appears on the cover of NASCAR 09, in which he serves as a mentor for players in the "Sprint for the Cup" mode. On May 15, 2015, he was announced as the cover driver of Eutechnyx's NASCAR '15. Gordon is the cover driver for Monster Games' NASCAR Heat 4 Gold Edition and appears exclusively in the gold edition as a playable driver and spotter.

Gordon appeared in Gran Turismo 5 as himself, providing tutorials on racing in NASCAR, which had been newly added to the series.
