= Pitbull (disambiguation) =

Pitbull or pit bull is a term used in the United States for any bull-type terrier.

Pitbull or pit bull may also refer to:

== People ==
=== Musicians and the arts ===
- Pitbull (rapper), Cuban-American entertainer (born Armando Christian Pérez)
- Bobby Slayton, "The Pitbull of Comedy"

=== Sportspeople ===
- Andrei Arlovski, Belarusian mixed martial artist also known as "The Pitbull"
- Thiago Alves (fighter), Brazilian mixed martial artist also known as "Pitbull"
- Patrício Freire, Brazilian mixed martial artist also known as "Pitbull"
- Patricky Freire, Brazilian mixed martial artist also known as "Pitbull"
- Diego Rivas (fighter), Chilean mixed martial artist also known as "Pitbull"
- Damien "The Pitbull" Vachon, professional wrestler
- Regis Fernandes Silva (born 1976), Brazilian footballer, nicknamed "Regis Pitbull"
- Márcio José Lisboa Fortes Filho (born 1987), Brazilian footballer, nicknamed "Marcinho Pitbull"
- Cláudio Mejolaro (born 1982), Brazilian footballer, nicknamed "Cláudio Pitbull"
- Halef Silva Melo (born 1994), Brazilian footballer, nicknamed "Halef Pitbull"
- Tyrell Malacia (born 1999), Dutch footballer, nicknamed "The Pitbull"
- Gary Medel (born 1987), Chilean footballer, nicknamed "Pitbull" due to his aggressive, hard-tackling style of play

== Groups and organizations ==
- Los Pitbulls, nickname of Alexis & Fido, a Latino Reggaetón duo
- Pitbull Studio, British videogame company
- Pitbull Syndicate, British videogame company

=== In sports ===
- The Pitbulls, professional wrestling tag team
  - Pitbull #1, alias for pro wrestler Gary Wolfe
  - Pitbull #2, alias for pro wrestler Anthony Durante
- The American Pitbulls, pro wrestling tag team
- The Havana Pitbulls, pro wrestling tag team
- The UK Pitbulls, pro wrestling tag team
- The Pitbulls, a former WWE professional wrestling tag team of Jamie Noble and Kid Kash
- Bristol Pitbulls, NIHL2 ice hockey team
- Florida Pit Bulls, ABA basketball team
- New York Pitbulls, International Fight League team
- Pennsylvania Pit Bulls, CBA basketball team
- Rotterdam Pitbulls, NRLB rugby league team
- Trelawny Pitbulls, speedway team

== Transportation and vehicles ==
- North American Rotorwerks Pitbull II, an American autrogyro design
- North American Rotorwerks Pitbull SS, an American autrogyro design
- North American Rotorwerks Pitbull Ultralight (I), an American autrogyro design

=== In fiction ===
- Pitbull, GDI vehicle in Command & Conquer video game series

== Entertainment and arts ==
- The Pitbulls (album), 2005 eponymous reggaeton album by Los Pitbulls
- Pitbull (film), 2005 Polish film
- Pit Bull (TV series), a debate show about NASCAR
- Pit Bull: The Battle over an American Icon, a history book about dogs

== See also ==
- Pitbull T, UK musician, member of Roll Deep
- Biggie Pitbull, UK musician, member of Roll Deep
- Pitbull/Public Enemy Memorial Cup, PWU pro-wrestling tournament
- Bull (disambiguation)
- Pit (disambiguation)
