= North American Rotorwerks Pitbull =

North American Rotorwerks Pitbull can refer to:

- North American Rotorwerks Pitbull SS, single seat ultralight autogyro
- North American Rotorwerks Pitbull Ultralight, single seat ultralight autogyro
- North American Rotorwerks Pitbull II, two seat autogyro
