= Omega Crosby =

American rapper

- Born: Micah Omega Crosby; December 3, 1993 (age 32); Modesto, California, U.S.
- Genres: Rap; hip hop
- Occupations: Rapper, Singer-songwriter, record producer
- Instrument: Digital audio workstation
- Years active: 2012–present
- Labels: Empire Distribution, Kemani Entertainment

Micah Omega Crosby (born December 3, 1993), is an American rapper, producer, and songwriter from Modesto, California. By 2012 Omega Crosby was releasing his own singles and music videos, and his first mixtape, Urban Muzik Vol.1, came out in early 2013. Currently signed to Empire Distribution, he has collaborated with hip hop artists such as Clyde Carson, Adrian Marcel, Mayne Mannish and Chingy. He has also completed production for members of the group The Team. He was nominated for Best Hip Hop Artist in late October 2015 for the Modesto Area Music Awards. In 2015 he released a mixtape titled "Modesto". A digital exclusive mixtape called "2016" was released January 1, 2016 by Bay Area based company Thizzler and Swisha House CEO, DJ Michael "5000" Watts. On January 20, 2016, he released his first independent album titled "Kalifornia".

== Early life ==
Micah Crosby was born in 1993 in Modesto, California, where he also spent his childhood. He is also the son of pastor and politician Darius Crosby, who is heavily involved in the Modesto community. He started making music at around age twelve, picking up hip hop production as a hobby. He soon started rapping over his own beats, and by sixteen he had decided he wanted to pursue music as a career. Crosby is a cousin to late singer and record producer, Rick James. Encouraged by family members such as his father, early musical inspirations included hip hop artists such as Lil Wayne, Jodeci, Curtis Mayfield and Notorious B.I.G.

== Discography ==
=== Mixtapes ===
Title	Release details
Lucid: The Official Mixtape	Released: March 21, 2012; Label: Self-released; Format: Digital
Urban Muzik Vol.1	Released: October 15, 2013; Label: Self-released; Format: Digital
2016	Released: January 1, 2016; Label: Self-released; Format: Digital

=== Albums ===
Albums by Omega Crosby
Title	Release details
Modesto	Released: October 17, 2015; Label: Omega Crosby Music; Format: Digital
Kalifornia	Released: January 20, 2016; Label: Omega Crosby Music; Format: Digital

=== Singles ===
Title	Release details
Get It	Released: October 12, 2013; Label: UMA Entertainment; Digital Download
"Him" (feat. Chingy)	Released: February 10, 2016; Label: Omega Crosby Music; Digital Download
Bugging	Released: April 15, 2016; Label: EMPIRE / Kemani Entertainment; Digital Download
Prince (feat. Mayne Mannish)	Released: May 9, 2016; Label: EMPIRE / Kemani Entertainment; Digital Download
That Bounce	Released: May 10, 2016; Label: EMPIRE / Kemani Entertainment; Digital Download
Everything New (feat. Clyde Carson)	Released: May 13, 2016; Label: EMPIRE / Kemani Entertainment; Digital Download
