= Clyde Carson discography =

The discography of American rapper Clyde Carson consists of a studio album, three EPs, three compilation albums, three mixtapes and four singles.

His debut studio album S.T.S.A. 2 (Something To Speak About) was released on February 10, 2017, via Moe Doe Entertainment. His three EPs Doin' That, Bass Rock and Playboy were released in 2007, 2009 and 2014, respectively. Playboy peaked on the US Heatseeker chart at 28th. Carson's 2006 compilation album with the Team, titled World Premiere, had peaked on the US R&B and Hip Hop chart at 95th. His 2012 single featuring the Team, "Slow Down", peaked on the R&B and Rap Songs charts at 45th and 22nd respectively.

== Studio albums ==
List of albums, with selected chart positions
| Title | Album details |
|---|---|
| S.T.S.A. 2 (Something To Speak About) | Released: February 10, 2017; Label: Moe Doe Entertainment, EMPIRE; Format: CD, digital download |

== EPs ==
List of albums, with selected chart positions
| Title | Album details | Peak chart positions | | | |
| Title | Album details | US | US R&B | US Rap | US Heat |
|---|---|---|---|---|---|
| Doin' That | Released: September 4, 2007; Label: Black Wall Street Records, Moedoe, Capitol Records; Format: Digital download | — | — | — | — |
| Bass Rock | Released: July 21, 2009; Label: Moe Doe Entertainment; Format: CD, Digital download | — | — | — | — |
| Playboy | Released: March 4, 2014; Label: Moe Doe Entertainment; Format: Digital download | — | — | — | 28 |
"—" denotes a title that did not chart, or was not released in that territory.

== Collaboration albums ==
List of collaboration studio albums, with selected chart positions
| Title | Album details | Peak chart positions | | |
| Title | Album details | US | US R&B | US Rap |
|---|---|---|---|---|
| Beyond The Glory (with The Team) | Released: 2002; Label: Moe Doe Entertainment; Formats: CD, digital download | — | — | — |
| The Negro League (with The Team) | Released: August 24, 2004; Label: Moe Doe Entertainment; Formats: CD, digital download | — | — | — |
| World Premiere (with The Team) | Released: April 4, 2006; Label: Moe Doe Entertainment, Koch Records; Formats: CD, digital download | — | 95 | — |
"—" denotes releases that did not chart or receive certification.

== Mixtapes ==
- 2001: The Story Vol. 1
- 2009: The Bay Star
- 2012: S.T.S.A. (Something To Speak About)

== Singles ==
List of singles, with selected chart positions, showing year released and album name
| Title | Year | Peak chart positions | | | Album |
| Title | Year | US | US R&B | US Rap | Album |
|---|---|---|---|---|---|
| "4 O' Clock" | 2001 | — | — | — | non-album single |
| "2 Step" | 2007 | — | — | — | Doin' That |
| "Slow Down" (featuring The Team) | 2012 | — | 45 | 22 | S.T.S.A.: Something To Speak About |
| "Pour Up (Drank With Me)" | 2013 | — | — | — | Playboy |
"—" denotes a recording that did not chart or was not released in that territory.
