= World Premiere =

A world premiere is the worldwide debut of a work.

World Premiere may also refer to:

- World Premiere (Partners-N-Crime album), 2001
- World Premiere (The Team album), 2006
- World Premiere (film), a 1941 film starring Frances Farmer
- World Premiere (horse), a Japanese racehorse
