= Pit Bull (TV series) =

- Genre: Debate
- Presented by: Steve Byrnes
- Starring: Mike Mulhern; David Poole; Marty Smith; Ben Blake; Lee Spencer; Robin Miller
- Country of origin: United States
- Original language: English
- No. of seasons: 1

Production
- Running time: 30 min. (including commercials)

Original release
- Network: Speed
- Release: February 21 – November 23, 2004

Pit Bull was a debate show that aired live every Saturday on Speed during the 2004 NASCAR season. The show took place outside of every venue of the NASCAR Cup Series. Host Steve Byrnes moderated debates involving a four-person panel of sportswriters whose columns are mostly about racing. The three primary panelists were Mike Mulhern of the Winston-Salem Journal, David Poole of The Charlotte Observer, and Marty Smith of NASCAR.com. The fourth panelist usually rotated between writers like Ben Blake, Lee Spencer of The Sporting News, and Speed Channel website writer Robin Miller. The panelists eventually became known as the "Pit Hogs."

== Format ==
Each week, the panel debated hot topics from the NASCAR world. At the end of the show, the four panelists got time to state their "beef" with an issue in NASCAR. It could've been a topic not yet touched on, a past issue, or a current issue. A live audience watched the show up-close each week. Each episode was a half-hour long.

== Criticism ==
The show drew ire from NASCAR officials and drivers for its panelists' consistently questioning a NASCAR ruling or such. Then, one night, on another SPEED program, NASCAR Inside Nextel Cup, NASCAR driver Jimmy Spencer, a panelist on that night's episode, slammed Pit Bull as being "anti-NASCAR." Many Pit Bull fans jokingly claimed that since they agreed with most of what was being questioned of NASCAR by the panel (and most of the time, it was Mulhern and Blake doing the questioning) that they were "anti-NASCAR", even though they were NASCAR fans.

Pit Bull debuted in February 2004, but on November 23, 2004, it was announced by SPEED that low ratings would keep the show from returning in 2005. Many Pit Bull viewers were upset by the announcement, accusing NASCAR of having a say in the show's cancellation because of its ability to question them. However, another similar NASCAR-related debate show debuted in 2006, named Tradin' Paint, featuring NASCAR drivers like Kyle Petty as panelists debating NASCAR issues in a similar fashion. Tradin' Paint would run until the 2009 NASCAR season.
