= The Farmer's Dog, Inc. =

American pet food firm based in New York City

The Farmer's Dog, Inc. is an American pet food firm based in New York City. It sells fresh dog food and treats through subscription plans and online retailers.

== History ==
Brett Podolsky started cooking for his dog after a veterinarian recommended changing the animal’s diet to address digestive problems. He and Jonathan Regev began developing dog food recipes in a kitchen in Manhattan’s East Village in 2014. They started delivering meals to customers in New York the following year.

The firm secured around $2 million in seed funding in 2016 from Forerunner Ventures. Another $8.1 million investment came in May 2017 via a Series A funding round headed by Shasta Ventures.

In 2019, The Farmer's Dog secured a total of $39 million in a Series B funding round led by Insight Partners. In June, the company leased approximately 19,000 square feet of office space located in Greenwich Village.

Another $65 million was raised in 2021 when the company had reached a valuation of $1.46 billion. By 2025, the company was generating in excess of $1 billion in annualized revenue and $10 million in monthly profits. The Farmer's Dog leased approximately 58,000 square feet of office space in Manhattan in August 2025.

The Farmer's Dog started selling its meal plans on Walmart.com in April 2026, followed by dog treats in July. In September 2026, the company acquired a manufacturer of dog toys and wellness products called Woof. At the same time, The Farmer's Dog became the National Football League's first official pet food partner.

== Business model ==
The Farmer's Dog sells dog food delivered frozen to customers' doors on a regular schedule according to meal plans selected from its website or Walmart.com. Customers have to share information about their dogs — age, weight and activity levels — for individual portions of food.

== Advertising ==
The Farmer's Dog launched its first Super Bowl ad called "Forever" during Super Bowl LVII on February 12, 2023. The ad tells a story of a girl and her dog growing old together. It was ranked number one in USA Today's Ad Meter for that year. Another commercial, "Referee", directed by John Hillcoat, aired during the 2024 NFL season opener.

== Research and partnerships ==
The Farmer's Dog became a Diamond Partner of the WSAVA in January 2024. In July 2026, the partnership was renewed at the Silver level until May 2028.

A study conducted by researchers from Cornell University and The Farmer's Dog was published in the journal Metabolites in October 2025. It compared fresh dog food to dry kibble in 22 senior Alaskan sled dogs. The study found metabolic differences between the two diets, including lower amounts of advanced glycation end products in dogs eating the fresh diet. The study was funded by The Farmer's Dog.
