= Super Bowl Ad Meter =

Annual survey of TV commercials during the Super Bowl

The USA Today Super Bowl Ad Meter is an annual survey taken of television commercials by USA Today in a live poll during the telecast in the United States of the Super Bowl, the annual professional American football championship game of the National Football League. The survey, which started in 1989, uses a live response on a zero-to-ten scale (zero being the worst, ten the best) of focus groups based in McLean, Virginia, the newspaper headquarters and one (or more) site(s) around the country.

== Background ==
The Super Bowl became the must-see event for advertisers during the third quarter of the telecast of Super Bowl XVIII on CBS, when Apple Computer debuted a one-time-only advertisement for their Macintosh computer titled 1984, directed by Ridley Scott. As the Los Angeles Raiders routed the Washington Redskins, 38–9, the Apple commercial, not the game, was the most-talked about item around water coolers the very next day. Since then, major advertisers have used the game, paying as much as seven figures (averaging over US $5 million for one 30-second slot as of 2018), excluding production expenses) to showcase their work and generate buzz that many people tune into television's biggest event of the year just to watch the commercials, not the actual game. For those reasons, USA Today started the Ad Meter, a poll that gives live responses per second of each commercial.

According to the newspaper, ads by rule are limited to those shown during the game. As of 2020, this was generally from opening kickoff through the fourth quarter 2-minute warning, and including halftime. Ads which are not eligible are house promotions, regional ads, pregame/postgame ads, ads that only run on digital platforms, and ads that run outside of the national network broadcast. A new element was added for 2012, as Facebook users and those logging onto the USA Today website were involved in a second survey that lasted until February 7 at 6:00 pm EST. The online element was added to the regular meter for 2013.

== Past winners ==
Year	Super Bowl	Advertiser	Ad Description
1989	XXIII	American Express	Actors Jon Lovitz and Dana Carvey (both starring at the time on Saturday Night Live) go to the big game with credit cards-Lovitz with Visa, Carvey with American Express.
1990	XXIV	Nike	Various announcers (Harry Caray among others) call a multisport event with the likes of Wayne Gretzky, Michael Jordan and Bo Jackson.
1991	XXV	Diet Pepsi	When Coca-Cola pulled a humorous ad in light of the First Iraqi war, Diet Pepsi scored big with Ray Charles and others (including Jerry Lewis, Tiny Tim, Vic Damone and Charo) singing their "You Got the Right One, Baby" jingle.
1992	XXVI	Nike	Michael Jordan and Bugs Bunny (calling himself "Hare Jordan") go to Mars and team up to take on an evil basketball team fielded by Marvin the Martian, with the fate of Earth at stake. The spot served as the inspiration for the film Space Jam.
1993	XXVII	McDonald's	Michael Jordan and Larry Bird play an outrageous game of H-O-R-S-E throughout Chicago for a Big Mac.
1994	XXVIII	Pepsi-Cola	A lab chimp turns into a party animal at the beach after drinking soda.
1995	XXIX	Pepsi-Cola	A boy on the beach tries to suck the last drop of Pepsi out of a bottle with a straw, sucking so hard that the backlash pulls him through the straw and into the bottle. His little sister then yells, "Mom, he's done it again!"
1996	XXX	Pepsi-Cola	A fictional Coke driver takes a can of Pepsi and the whole shelf of cans tumbles onto the floor in a simulated security camera footage, with the Hank Williams song "Your Cheatin' Heart" in the background. The commercial was chosen as the best ever ad in the twenty-year history in a special survey of the previous poll winners in 2008.
1997	XXXI	Pepsi-Cola	Computer-animated grizzly bears do their Pepsi-inspired 1980s classics with the YMCA.
1998	XXXII	Pepsi-Cola	A skysurfer does aerial tricks with a goose, and they share a Pepsi afterwards.
1999	XXXIII	Budweiser	Two dalmatian puppies are separated at birth, and one becomes the mascot of the Clydesdale-driven beer wagon.
2000	XXXIV	Budweiser	Rex the Wonder Dog imagines chasing a Budweiser truck, only to blindly leap headfirst onto a mini-van.
2001	XXXV	Bud Light	Cedric the Entertainer's dream date is ruined when he accidentally shakes a pair of Bud Light bottles which explode all over his girlfriend.
2002	XXXVI	Bud Light	A girlfriend entices her beau into bed with Bud Light, but he slides on the satin sheets and flies out the apartment window.
2003	XXXVII	Budweiser	Spoofing the instant replay challenge rule, a real zebra reviews a disputed call, holding up a football game between Clydesdale horses. One of the two humans watching calls the "official" a jackass, while the other, apparently oblivious to the epithet, seriously responds that it is a zebra.
2004	XXXVIII	Bud Light	Two dog trainers outdo one another, until one dog bites the other trainer in the groin. The ad was shown during the tumult of the controversial halftime show that year.
2005	XXXIX	Bud Light	A frightened skydiver (Jonny Lee) making his first jump is enticed with a six-pack of beer, but it only makes the plane's pilot jump after it.
2006	XL	Bud Light	A guy stocks his refrigerator full of Bud Light, and to keep his friends from drinking it, he installs it on a turntable. However, the turntable rotates into the apartment next door, and the guys inside are extremely happy to see the "magic fridge" return, even to the point of worshiping it.
2007	XLI	Budweiser	Computer-generated crabs idolize a cooler filled with Bud.
2008	XLII	Budweiser	Paying tribute to the 1976 Academy Award Best Picture Rocky, a Clydesdale is inspired by a rather unusual personal trainer to become a member of the hitch team for the iconic horse-drawn wagon: its dalmatian mascot.
2009	XLIII	Doritos	In the first ever fan-generated commercial to claim top ranking, two men use a snow globe to grant their wishes. One throws it at (and breaks the glass front panel of) a vending machine and gets his wish for "free" Doritos. The other wishes for a promotion, but accidentally throws it at his boss's groin. The ad makers, Joe and David Herbert of Batesville, Indiana, won US$1 million in a promotion sponsored by Doritos owner PepsiCo.
2010	XLIV	Snickers	Octogenarian performers Betty White and Abe Vigoda play tackle football.
2011 (tie)	XLV	Bud Light	A man dog sits intelligent dogs with a refrigerator full of Bud Light getting the dogs to cater a party for him serving said product. In a last shot, the dogs are playing cards with the guy picking up after them.
2011 (tie)	XLV	Doritos	A boyfriend teases his girlfriend's pug with Doritos, closes and stands behind a glass door, causing the pug to run towards him, the pug knocks down the glass door to be on top of the boyfriend and gets the Doritos. Because of a tie, the ad was awarded $1 million from PepsiCo, the second time in three years an ad created by online users won.
2012	XLVI	Doritos (panel; online)	Another low-budget dog ad from Doritos won the creator, Jonathan Friedman (from Virginia Beach, Virginia), the third $1 million bonus offered by PepsiCo in four years by having the owner of a cat bribed by his dog with a small bag of the sponsor's product in the panel voting. The cost of the ad was $20. The online winner, announced February 7, was another fan-made Doritos ad called "Sling Baby", created by West Los Angeles resident Kevin Willson. The ad featured 17-month-old Jonah Folk, who was used by his grandmother to steal a bag of Doritos from a boy who taunted them with the bag. They achieved that using the baby's chair as a slingshot. The prize money of $1 million was divided among cast and crew, including Folk's father, who worked on the special effects.
2013	XLVII	Budweiser	A Clydesdale is born. Three years later, the Clydesdales come to town. The owner has an emotional reunion with the Clydesdale born at his farm. (The real life foal was born eighteen days before the ad aired.) The ad is set to "Landslide" by Fleetwood Mac.
2014	XLVIII	Budweiser	A puppy from an adoption agency runs off to a farm to play with a Clydesdale horse. Every time he does that he goes back to the adoption agency. When he is adopted by a customer, the Clydesdales run out and take the puppy and the horse owner decides to keep it. The ad features "Let Her Go" by Passenger.
2015	XLIX	Budweiser	A lost puppy finds its way home and then is saved from trouble by some very powerful friends, namely some Clydesdale horses.
2016	50	Hyundai	Kevin Hart plays the role of a helicopter parent during his daughter's first date, using a car finder GPS app to track the Hyundai Genesis that she and her boyfriend are driving and following them wherever they go (including, at one point, from an actual helicopter). The ad is set to "Another One Bites the Dust" by Queen.
2017	LI	Kia	Melissa McCarthy plays the role of a woman sent to protect the environment, but gets involved in various calamities. The ad features "Holding Out for a Hero" by Bonnie Tyler.
2018	LII	Amazon.com	Alexa has lost her voice, and celebrities like Anthony Hopkins, Rebel Wilson and Cardi B help out. The ad features "Nobody Does It Better" by Carly Simon. It barely beat out an NFL ad starring Eli Manning and Odell Beckham Jr. that parodied the film Dirty Dancing.
2019	LIII	NFL	Marshawn Lynch knocks a football centerpiece off a cake during a gala celebrating the NFL's 100th season, prompting a fight for the ball involving over 40 current and past players.
2020	LIV	Jeep	Phil Connors (Bill Murray reprising his role from Groundhog Day) awakens, transported back to the 1993 Punxsutawney time loop but this time finding a Jeep Gladiator. He takes the Jeep, along with Punxsutawney Phil, to go on several off-road adventures. Stephen Tobolowsky also guest stars, reprising his role of insurance-selling "pest" Ned Ryerson. Super Bowl LIV was played on February 2, 2020 which is the date of Groundhog Day.
2021	LV	Rocket Mortgage	Tracy Morgan shows a family why "pretty sure" is not a good thing, from encountering a bear to fighting Dave Bautista, while touting that "certain" is better in terms of buying a house with Rocket Mortgage.
2022	LVI	Rocket Mortgage	Anna Kendrick stars in an apparent commercial for a Barbie toy house, when they are faced with the grim modern realities of homebuying. However, Kendrick shows Barbie getting her Malibu home with the help of Rocket Mortgage.
2023	LVII	The Farmer's Dog	A Chocolate Labrador grows up with a girl who grows up alongside him. The ad is set to the song "Forever" by Lee Fields.
2024	LVIII	State Farm	A State Farm agent played by Arnold Schwarzenegger is struggling to say neighbor but says "neighbaaa" instead. He gets help from Jake from State Farm and Danny DeVito and is able to deliver the line "Like A Good Neighbor, State Farm Is There".
2025	LIX	Budweiser	A Clydesdales foal helps retrieve a keg which fell from a carriage delivering Budweiser beer.
2026	LX	Budweiser	A young Clydesdale foal takes an abandoned chick under its care. In a montage set to "Free Bird" by Lynyrd Skynyrd, they grow up side-by-side, culminating in a shot of the now-adult bald eagle perched behind the Clydesdale to resemble a Pegasus.

== Multiple winners ==
- Anheuser-Busch (Budweiser, Bud Light brands) - 15 (1999-2008, 2011, 2013–15, 2025–26)
- PepsiCo (Pepsi-Cola and Diet Pepsi drink brands, Frito-Lay Doritos) -10 (1991, 1994–98, 2009, 2011–12)
- Hyundai Motor Group (Hyundai, Kia brands) - 2 (2016–17)
- Nike - 2 (1990–92)
- Rocket Mortgage - 2 (2021–22)
