= North American Rotorwerks =

American aircraft manufacturer

North American Rotorwerks LLC
- Company type: Privately held company
- Industry: Aerospace
- Founded: circa 2008
- Headquarters: Tukwila, Washington, United States
- Key people: John Vanvoorhees
- Products: Autogyros
- Website: www.pitbullrotorcraft.com

North American Rotorwerks LLC (English: North American Rotorworks) is an American aircraft manufacturer based in Tukwila, Washington, founded by John Vanvoorhees. The company specializes in the design and manufacture of autogyros in the form of kits for amateur construction.

The company's Pitbull Ultralight and SS models as well as their Pitbull II are intended to resemble the tractor configuration radial engine-equipped autogyro designs that were popular in the 1930s. The designs utilize Dragon Blade rotors made by Rotor Flight Dynamics.

By December 2014 the US Federal Aviation Administration had six Pitbull autogyros on its aircraft registry, although eight had been registered at one time.

Founded circa 2008, by February 2013 the company website carried a note indicating that production had been suspended "due to changing circumstances".

== Aircraft ==
Summary of aircraft built by North American Rotorwerks
Model name	First flight	Number built	Type
North American Rotorwerks Pitbull Ultralight			single seat, tractor configuration autogyro
North American Rotorwerks Pitbull SS			single seat, tractor configuration autogyro
North American Rotorwerks Pitbull II			two seat, tractor configuration autogyro
