= Magali Amadei =

French model, actress, and writer

Magali Ama
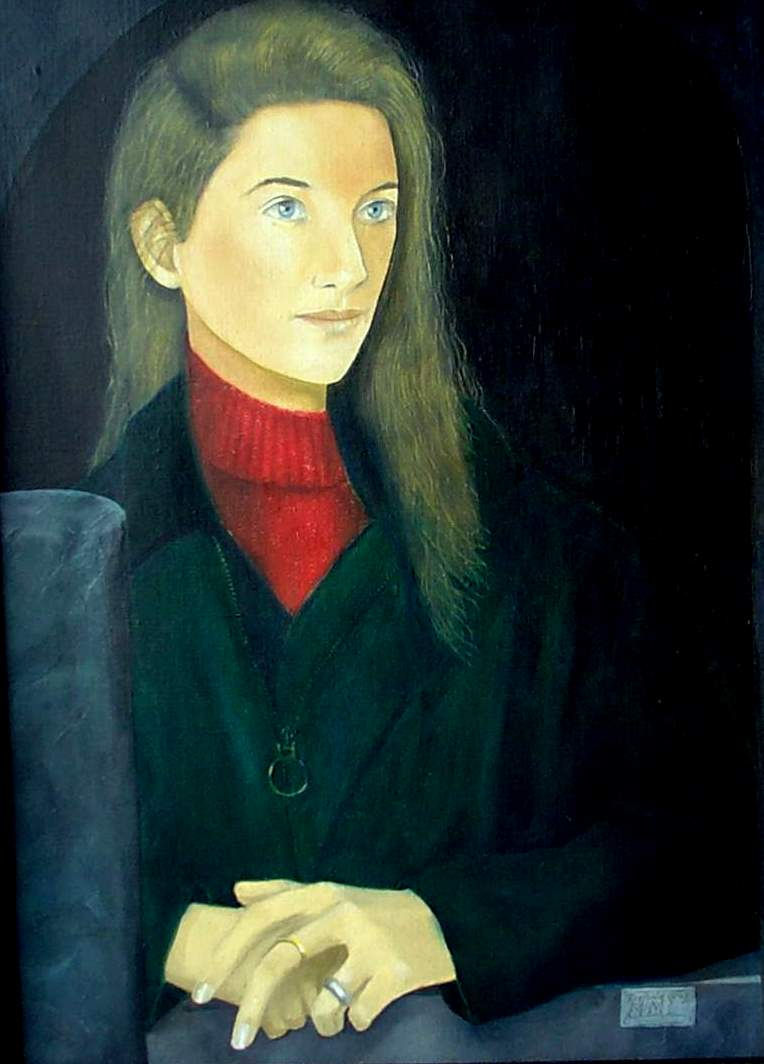
- Portrait of Magali Ama.
- Born: November 30, 1974 (age 51); Nice, France
- Occupations: Actress, model
- Modeling information
- Height: 178 cm (5 ft 10 in)
- Hair color: brown
- Eye color: hazel
- Agency: Q Model Management

Magali Ama (born November 30, 1974) is a French model, actress, and writer.

== Biography ==
Ama was discovered at age 16 while studying ballet at The Opera House in Nice. After a summer spent modeling in New York City, she abandoned her original plan to move to Japan for pre-medical education, and instead pursued modeling full-time. Ama was featured on the covers of Cosmopolitan and Glamour, but also suffered from the eating disorder bulimia for seven years while working as a fashion model, and sought help after passing out at a photo shoot. After treatment she began visiting schools to share her experience with students. She also appeared in television and film roles, including supporting and minor roles in House of D and Taxi. In 2009, with co-author Claire Mysko, Ama published the book Does This Pregnancy Make Me Look Fat?, about body changes and social expectations during pregnancy. The Los Angeles Daily News praised the book for taking on issues around pregnancy "in a hip, compassionate way".

== Filmography ==
- Inferno! (1992), Ellen Von Unwerth
- Blood Trail (1997), Naomi
- The Groomsmen (2001), Tanya
- The Wedding Planner (2001), Wendy
- The Mind of the Married Man (2001, TV)
- Kingpin (2003, TV)
- House of D (2004), Coralie Warshaw
- Taxi (2004), Fourth Robber
