= Pepsi Max & Jeff Gordon Present: Test Drive =

- Starring: Jeff Gordon
- Narrated by: Jeff Gordon
- Distributed by: Gifted Youth
- Release date: March 12, 2013
- Running time: 3:46
- Country: United States
- Language: English

Pepsi Max & Jeff Gordon Present: Test Drive is a 2013 short film produced by Gifted Youth, the commercial division of Funny or Die. The film was directed by Peter Atencio and stars NASCAR driver Jeff Gordon. The film served as part of a viral marketing advertising campaign to promote Pepsi Max. The film was released through Pepsi's YouTube channel on March 12, 2013. It quickly became a viral video, and earned more than 45 million views on YouTube as of March 2016. The film was shortened into a television advertisement which aired in North America during the 2013 NASCAR Sprint Cup Series season.

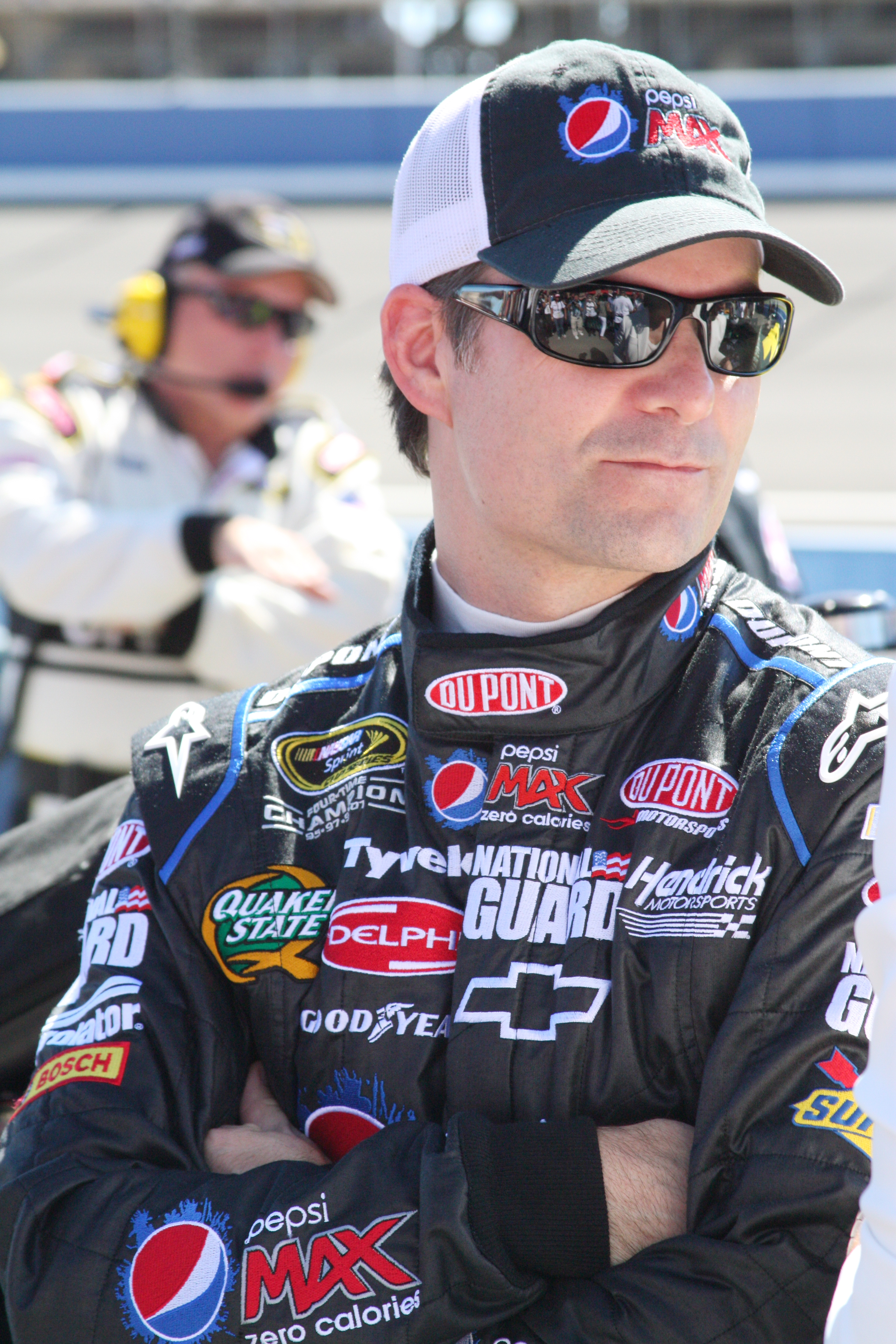
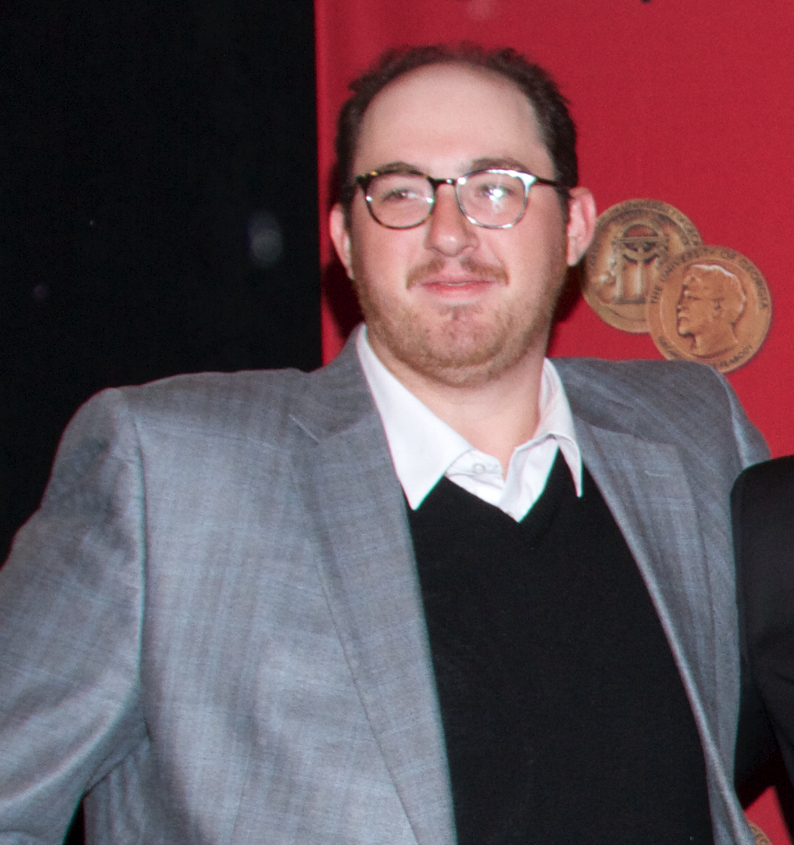
Pepsi Max driver/spokesperson Jeff Gordon (left) and director Peter Atencio (right)

== Plot ==
In the video, Gordon, disguised as an older man in make-up with a fake mustache and goatee, shows up at a car dealership in Concord, North Carolina. He introduces himself as "Mike" to Steve, the salesman. The salesman notices that Gordon is "gravitated towards the Camaro" and asks him if he is thinking about getting one. Gordon asserts that the vehicle is "way too much car" for him and that he didn't know if he could handle it. The salesman offers Gordon a test drive, which he accepts. As they begin to take off, Gordon seems a bit nervous and hits the brakes a few times, to which the salesman responds by saying "It's got some power. So just get a feel for it." Gordon then speeds off, doing burnouts and driving recklessly through the parking lot, while sending the salesman into shock and using profanity as he demands Gordon to slow down and stop the car. Gordon performs one final burnout before spinning around and reversing the vehicle back into its spot. The salesman angrily storms out of the car and goes after Gordon, threatening to call the police on him. Gordon tries to calm him down as he reveals that this is a prank, pointing out all the cameras recording the action before ripping off his fake mustache to reveal his true identity. The film ends with Gordon apologizing to the stunned salesman, who asks him if he wants to do it again, to which Gordon replies "Yeah, let's do it again!"

== Filming ==
The film was shot over two days at Troutman Motors, a car dealership in Concord, North Carolina, during the NASCAR off-season heading into 2013. Brad Noffsinger, a driver for the Richard Petty Driving Experience, performed the stunts for the video.

Gordon wore a "glasses cam" while filming to capture everything he could see for the viewer's entertainment. In addition, a Pepsi Max can was used as a "can cam" to provide in-car shots during the test drive, while also promoting the product itself.

== Sequel ==
In February 2014, a sequel was filmed, featuring Gordon posing as a taxi driver and ex-convict, driving Test Drive skeptic Travis Okulski in a police car chase. The prank took eight months to plan. Gordon, Okulski and Pepsi Max state that the prank is real; although the two rear antennas on the taxi disappear and reappear, it was later revealed that some clips from the video were from rehearsals. The film was released through Pepsi's YouTube channel on February 27, 2014. The sequel earned more than 21 million views as of March 2016.

The original and sequel have since been pulled from Pepsi's YouTube channel, but copies from other users can still be found on the website. Additionally they can be found on director Peter Atencio's online portfolio via Vimeo.

== See also ==
- List of Internet phenomena
