= Taxi (2004 film) =

2004 film by Tim Story

- Theatrical release poster
- Directed by: Tim Story
- Screenplay by: Robert Ben Garant; Thomas Lennon; Jim Kouf
- Based on: Taxi by Luc Besson
- Produced by: Luc Besson
- Starring: Queen Latifah; Jimmy Fallon; Gisele Bündchen; Jennifer Esposito; Ann-Margret
- Cinematography: Vance Burberry
- Edited by: Stuart Levy
- Music by: Christophe Beck
- Production companies: EuropaCorp; Robert Simonds Productions
- Distributed by: 20th Century Fox
- Release dates: October 6, 2004 (United States); August 31, 2005 (France)
- Running time: 97 minutes
- Countries: United States; France
- Language: English
- Budget: $25 million
- Box office: $71.3 million

Taxi is a 2004 action comedy film directed by Tim Story and starring Queen Latifah, Jimmy Fallon, Gisele Bündchen in her film debut, Jennifer Esposito, and Ann-Margret. An incompetent New York City police officer is banned from driving and comes to rely on a talented taxi driver to help him solve a series of bank robberies. The film is a remake of the 1998 French film of the same name.

The film is set in New York City. In the film, a demoted police detective convinces a taxicab driver to help him track down a Brazilian gang of bank robbers, and to find out how the gang transports the stolen money. The detective is soon fired for insubordination, but the duo proceeds to confront the gang.

The film was released by 20th Century Fox on October 6, 2004, in the United States. While the film was a modest success at the box office, it was panned by critics.

== Plot ==
Bicycle courier Belle Williams earns her taxi license and installs a supercharger in her custom-built 1999 Ford Crown Victoria taxicab. Her first customer offers her a $100 tip if she can make it to the airport in fifteen minutes. She succeeds by driving quickly through the streets of New York City.

Meanwhile, bumbling detective Andy Washburn crashes his partner's car while on a mission to apprehend a group of robbers, and is demoted to foot patrol duty by his boss Lt. Marta Robbins, who is also his ex-girlfriend. Hearing of another bank robbery, Washburn flags down Belle's taxi.

They arrive at the bank just as a quartet of female Brazilian robbers leave in a BMW 7-series. Belle recognizes them as models she saw earlier at the airport. Police arrive and mistakenly apprehend Belle and Washburn. Her cab is impounded, and she is questioned. Washburn promises to get her car back if she helps him solve the bank robberies.

Washburn takes Belle to his home after her boyfriend Jesse kicks her out for missing a special dinner date. Washburn's constantly drunk mother brings up embarrassing moments of his past and talks about why he is such a bad driver.

Washburn convinces the impound cop to return Belle's cab. The duo realizes the gang robs banks just before the garbage collection is due, placing the money in the trash, which the garbage man then collects.

Washburn is fired for disobeying orders, and Belle is given a final warning for reckless driving. Belle teaches Washburn to drive, and they figure out which garbage collector is acting for the gang, discovering they have kidnapped his wife. The duo recover his wife and the money.

Figuring out which bank is next to be hit, the police ambush the robbers. As they have taken a hostage, Robbins offers to take his place, which they accept. As they escape, Washburn and Belle follow in her cab. Belle calls on the help of her bicycle courier friends to pinpoint the car.

Negotiating a trade with the thieves, they organize to swap the robbery cash for Robbins. This exchange, the hostage for the money, is to be done while driving down the highway. So, Washburn leads the robbers towards a long bridge under construction.

The robbers' leader Vanessa fires her gun at them, wounding Belle. While the police arrest Vanessa, Washburn drives Belle to the hospital, singing "This Will Be (An Everlasting Love)". He crashes into the hospital entrance, so Belle can be attended quickly.

Belle achieves her dream of driving in NASCAR, sponsored by New York banks. Washburn is reinstated for foiling the robberies, going undercover with Robbins as a couple. They and Washburn's mother attend Belle's first race to cheer her on. Jesse proposes to Belle via Jumbotron. As Belle begins the race, Jeff Gordon pulls up as a challenger.

== Cast ==
- Queen Latifah as Isabelle "Belle" Precious Williams, a bicycle messenger turned taxi driver who dreams of being at NASCAR
- Jimmy Fallon as Detective Andrew Washburn, an undercover detective of NYPD
- Gisele Bündchen as Vanessa, a Brazilian bank robber
- Henry Simmons as Jesse
- Jennifer Esposito as Lieutenant Marta Robbins, Andrew Washburn's cold-hearted boss and ex-girlfriend.
- Ana Cristina de Oliveira as Redhead, Vanessa's Portuguese second robber
- Ingrid Vandebosch as Third Robber
- Magali Amadei as Fourth Robber
- Ann-Margret as Mrs. Washburn
- Adam LeFevre as Big Cop
- Christian Kane as Agent Mullins, a self-centered FBI Agent
- Boris McGiver as Franklin
- Adrian Martinez as Brazilian Man
- Joe Lisi as Mr. Anthony Scalia
- GQ as Mario, the Stopwatch Messenger
- Patton Oswalt as Clerk at Inpound Office
- John Rothman as Business Man
- Bryna Weiss as Mrs. Scalia
- Jeff Gordon as himself, NASCAR driver of the #24 Dupont Chevrolet Monte Carlo

== Reception ==
=== Box office ===
Taxi was released on October 6, 2004, in 3,001 theaters and opened at #4 at the box office with $12 million in the opening weekend. It went on to gross $36.9 million domestically and $34.4 million from other markets for a worldwide total of $71.3 million, against a production budget of $25 million.

The film was released in the United Kingdom on November 19, 2004, and opened on #5.

=== Critical response ===
On the review aggregator website Rotten Tomatoes, 9% of 105 critics' reviews are positive. The website's consensus reads: "Silly and unfunny remake of a French movie of the same name." Metacritic, which uses a weighted average, assigned the film a score of 27 out of 100, based on 27 critics, indicating "generally unfavorable" reviews. Audiences polled by CinemaScore gave the film an average grade of "B+" on an A+ to F scale.

Mick LaSalle of the San Francisco Chronicle wrote: "How one likes Taxi has everything to do with how one responds to the hapless cop character, played by Jimmy Fallon." LaSalle was also critical of the car chases, calling them "lackluster and fairly unconvincing." Kirk Honeycutt of The Hollywood Reporter wrote: "This thoroughly repetitive, ill conceived and poorly executed effort—with an emphasis on the word 'effort'—defeats these two talented people more often than not."

Robert Koehler of Variety called the film "embarrassing evidence that even a ragged French original can be better than its American remake. Failing to improve on the inept but hugely successful 1998 Luc Besson vehicle." Roger Ebert of the Chicago Sun-Times stated "Oh, this is a bad movie" and "only gets worse as it plows along." Megan Lehmann of the New York Post dubbed the film "Taxi Drivel" and said: "This witless action comedy begins to insult the audience's intelligence from the opening scene."

Claudia Puig of USA Today wrote: "A surprisingly funny, female-driven romp—as long as you don't question too many plot particulars."

=== Accolades ===
Year	Ceremony	Category	Recipients	Result
2005	Teen Choice Awards	Choice Movie: Villain	Gisele Bündchen	Nominated
2005	Teen Choice Awards	Choice Movie: Female Breakout Star	Gisele Bündchen	Nominated
2005	Teen Choice Awards	Choice Movie: Rockstar Moment	Jimmy Fallon sings "This Will Be (An Everlasting Love)"	Nominated
