= Pepsi Zero Sugar =

Sugar-free cola

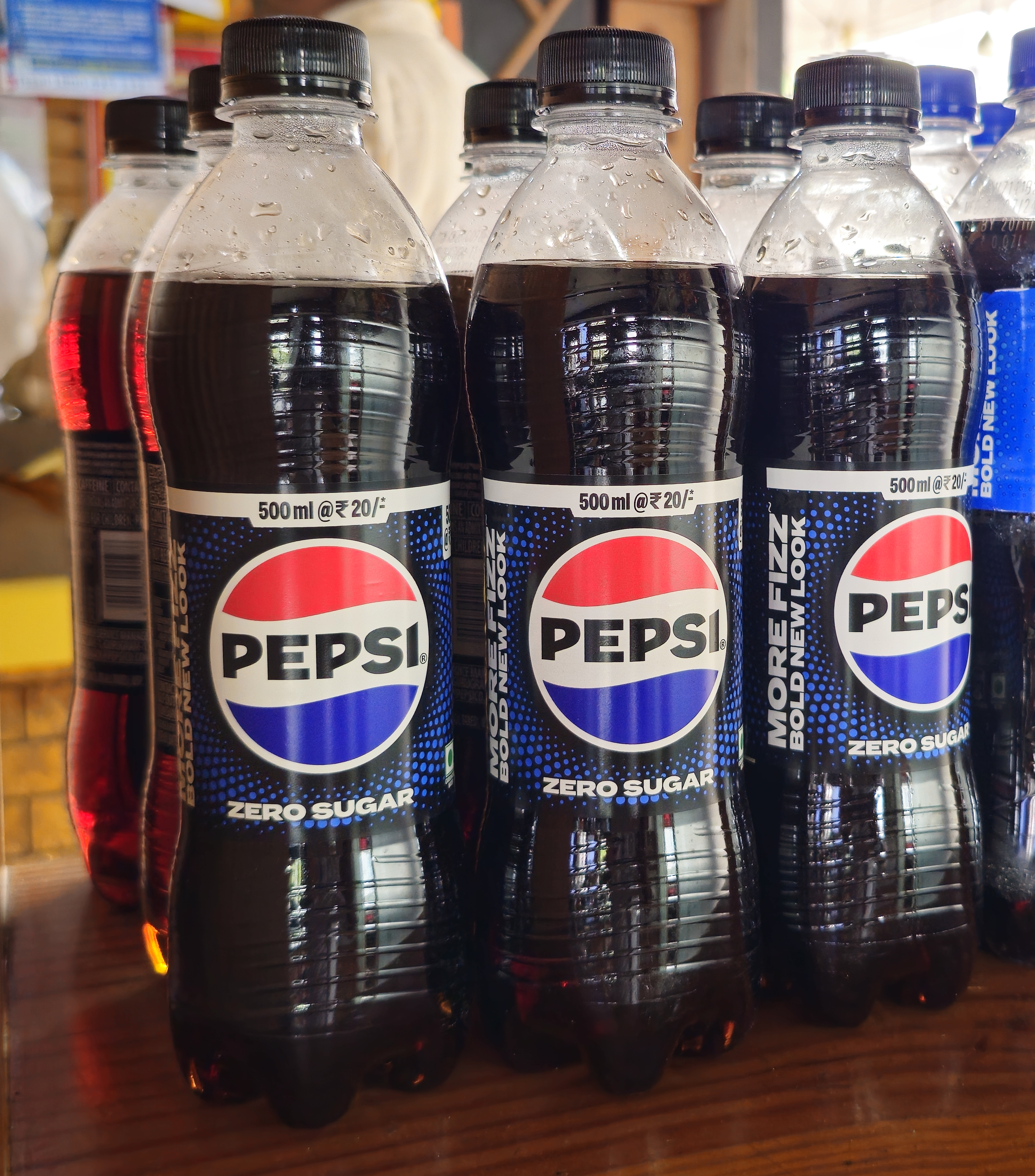
- 500ml bottles of Pepsi Zero Sugar
- Product type: Diet soda
- Current owner: PepsiCo
- Country: United States
- Introduced: 2007; 19 years ago (as "Diet Pepsi Max")
- Related brands: Pepsi Max, Pepsi One, Diet Pepsi, Diet Coke, Coca-Cola Zero Sugar
- Markets: United States, Canada, India
- Website: pepsi.com/zerosugar

Pepsi Zero Sugar, also known as Pepsi Max and Pepsi Black, is a low-calorie, sugar-free cola, marketed by PepsiCo. A diet soda soft drink, it was first released in 1993 as an alternative to the company's Diet Pepsi and has been widely available since.

Pepsi Zero Sugar tries to mimic the taste of Pepsi using a blend of acesulfame potassium and aspartame artificial sweeteners instead of sugar, with small variations depending on region.

== History ==
Pepsi-Cola International spent around three years developing the product with the aim to create a sugar-free drink but tasting indistinguishable from regular Pepsi. The product aimed to target those who chose not to consume Diet Pepsi because of, what they would consider to be, an inferior taste and image.

It was officially announced on 2 March 1993, and initially called Pepsi Max. It was launched to test markets in Great Britain and Italy starting in April. The rollout was expanded to other countries in Europe and Australia and it was successful, becoming a permanent offering and availability growing to close to twenty countries by 1994. However the product remained unavailable in the United States (PepsiCo's home market, and the largest consumer of carbonated soft drinks), where one of its principal ingredients had not yet been approved by the Food and Drug Administration. The ingredient—acesulfame potassium ("Ace-K")—is combined with aspartame to provide the beverage's sweetness, whereas some other diet colas are sweetened by aspartame alone.

Pepsi Max's early logos

1993–96

1996–98

Beginning in early 1994, an entirely different Pepsi Max was marketed in Canada because of strict local laws regarding artificial sweeteners. This was the only Pepsi Max product to contain sugar. It was sweetened with a combination of aspartame and high fructose corn syrup. As a result, it contained two-thirds fewer calories than full-sugar colas (including regular Pepsi), but more calories than conventional diet/light colas (or the version of Pepsi Max sold elsewhere). The Canadian product was discontinued in 2002. Pepsi-Cola North America later introduced another "mid-calorie" drink called Pepsi Edge to compete against Coca-Cola C2 (both became failures), but has no direct relationship to the earlier Canadian Max formulation.

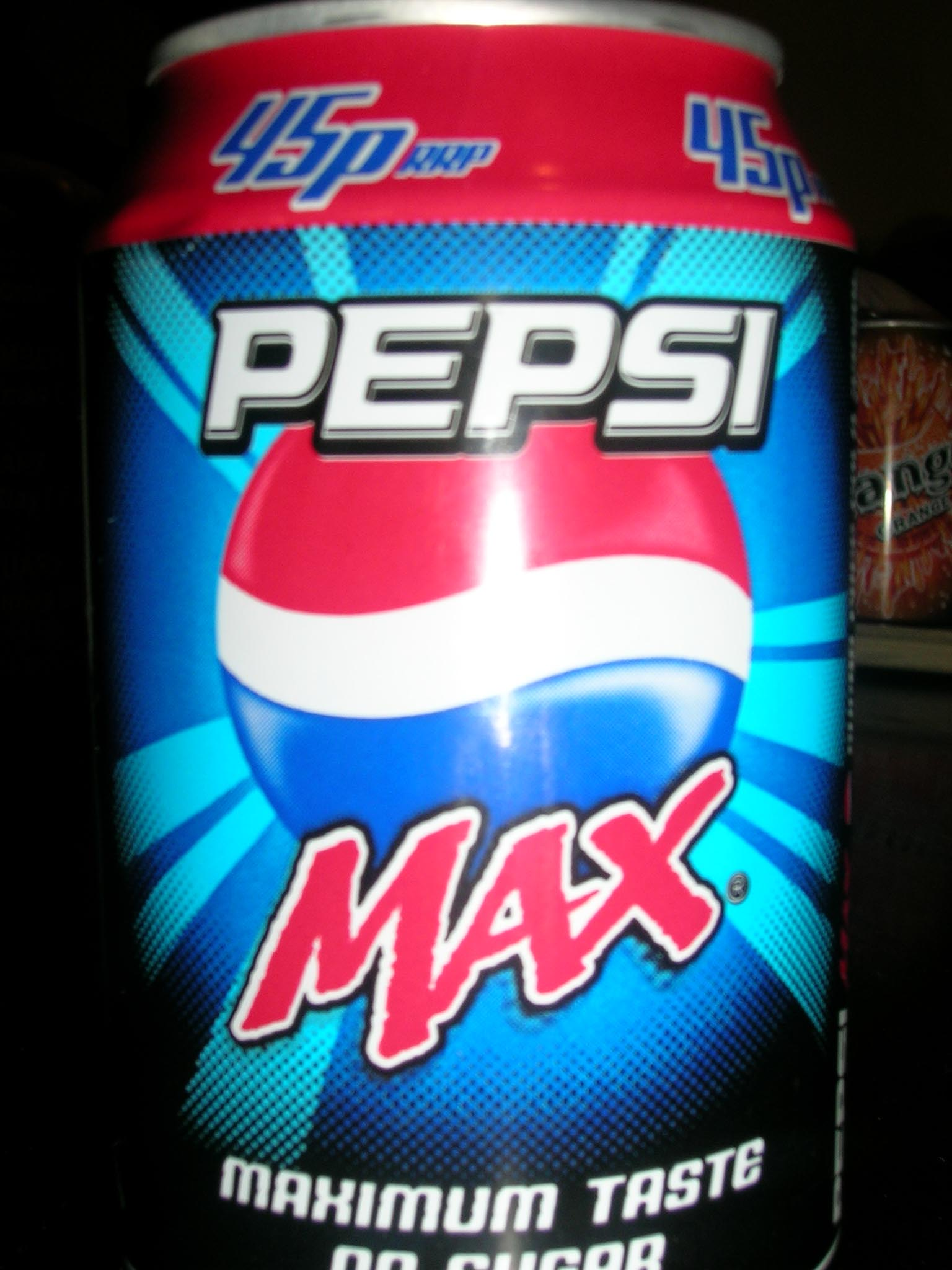
A 330 ml Pepsi Max can (Europe)

In 1998, after the American FDA approved acesulfame potassium, the company introduced Pepsi One for the North American market. This new variety contained the same sweeteners as Pepsi Max, but not an identical formula or flavour. In 2005, Pepsi One was revised, with Splenda brand sucralose replacing the aspartame ingredient. Diet Pepsi Max was introduced in the United States and Canada in 2007 and 2008 respectively. This drink had the same sweeteners as Pepsi Max in other countries but had additional ginseng and caffeine. It was later renamed to simply Pepsi Zero Sugar.

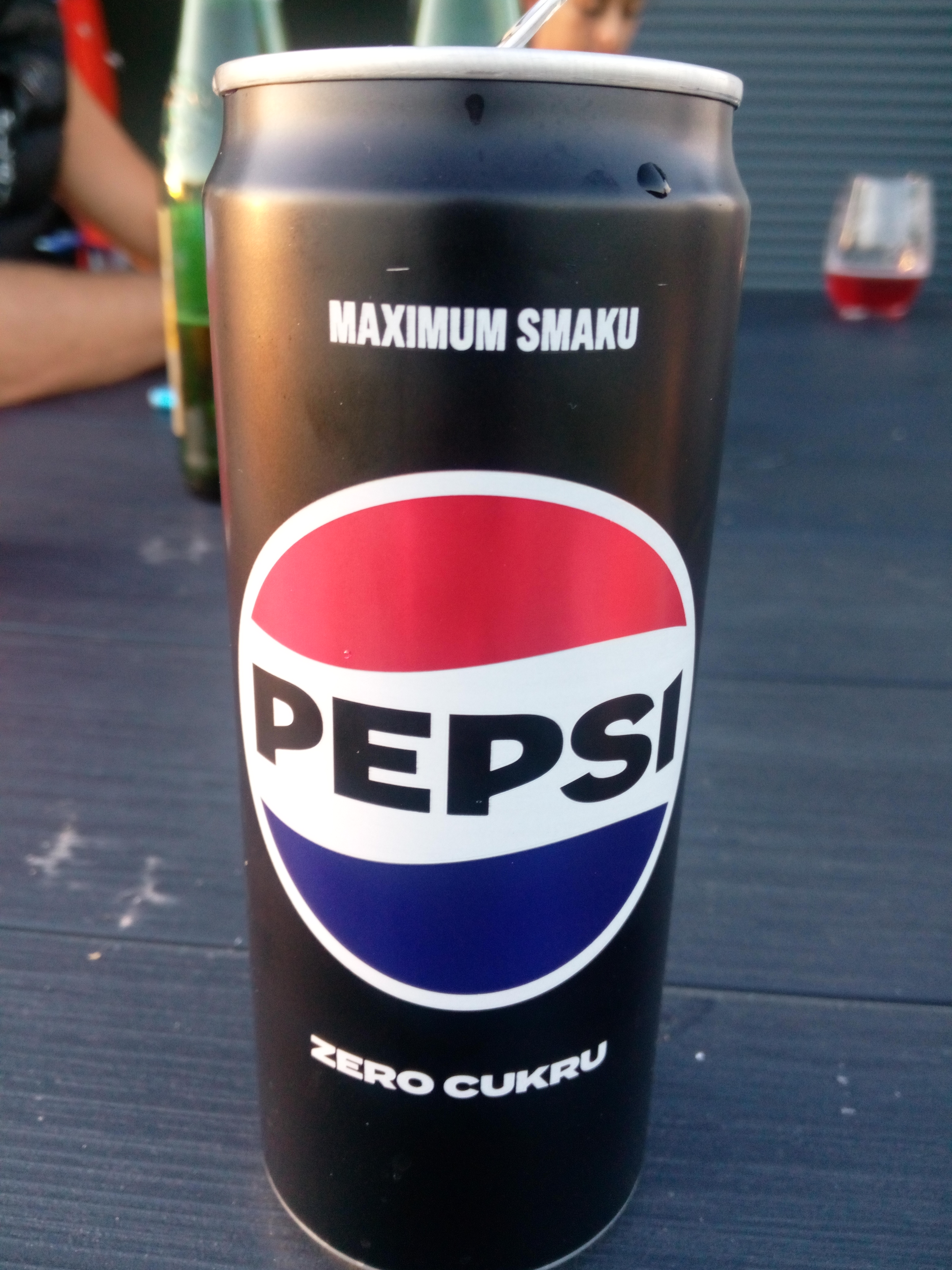
A can of Pepsi Zero Cukru (Polish language equivalent of Pepsi Zero Sugar) rebranded from Pepsi Max. These are not the same as the Pepsi Zero Sugar sold in America and Canada.

Pepsi began making new flavoured variants of the drink beginning in 2004, such as Pepsi Max Lemon and Pepsi Max Twist (with added lemon-lime flavour) in some countries' product lines. Diet Pepsi Max was introduced in the United States on 1 June 2007, and in Canada in March 2008. "Diet" was dropped from the name in early 2009. Availability of Pepsi Zero Sugar was expanded to further countries in Asia, the Middle East and Europe in mid-late 2000s. It launched in India in 2010 but faced low sales there. It launched in Tanzania in 2019 and in Arab states of the Persian Gulf, Jordan, Morocco and Libya as Pepsi Black in October 2019.

In 2002, Pepsi Max became the second highest-selling soft drink in Norway. Since 2015 it has been the top selling soft drink in the country. As of 2025, Pepsi Max makes up 98.4% of all total Pepsi cola sales in Norway. The drink has also found success in neighbouring Sweden where it had grown bigger than Pepsi's regular drink by 2007. In 2025 it was reported that Pepsi Max was the best selling carbonated soft drink in Sweden.

== Ingredients and comparison ==
Pepsi Zero Sugar contains carbonated water, caramel colour, phosphoric acid, aspartame, natural flavour, acesulfame potassium and citric acid.

When launched in 2007 (as Diet Pepsi Max in North America) it originally contained nearly twice the caffeine of PepsiCo's other cola beverages specifically 69 milligrams of caffeine per 355 mL (12.5 imp fl oz), versus 36 milligrams in Diet Pepsi. In January 2023, PepsiCo reformulated Pepsi Zero Sugar in the United States to reduce caffeine, remove ginseng and tweak the sweetener system. The formulation change did not affect Pepsi Zero Sugar in Canada.

These ingredients should not be confused with Pepsi Zero Sugar in other countries which are simply rebranded Pepsi Max.

Pepsi Zero Sugar (standard) nutrients and comparison (as of September 2025)
	American (12 fl oz)	Canadian (355 mL/12 fl oz)
Protein	0 g	0.1 g
Sodium	40 mg	35 mg
Caffeine	38 mg (69 mg until Dec 2022)	50 mg (69 mg until c. 2024)
Panax ginseng	No (removed in Dec 2022)	Yes

== Packaging and brand name ==
Pepsi Max has been produced in a variety of plastic cans, bottles, and glass bottles.

Pepsi Max logo after 1998, the first with the stylized red MAX

At launch, the first Pepsi Max livery was distinguished from regular Pepsi by having a blue coloured can instead of white. The colour inspired the company to rebrand the regular Pepsi drink into an all-blue colour in 1996 in what it called Project Blue. By the year 1998, at the centenary of the company, the entire Pepsi branding and marketing globally had adopted the blue that was introduced with the Pepsi Max. The Pepsi Max logo also adopted a graffiti-like red branding for MAX in 1998 in a typical trendy style of the millennium era, and which would be a precursor for later brandings.

From 2009–2010 all Pepsi brands were rebranded worldwide and the blue and red globe trademark became a series of "smiles", with the central white band arcing at different angles depending on the product. In the case of Pepsi Max, and at least in the North American market (where it was also renamed with its international name from "Diet Pepsi Max"), the logo had a large "smile" and also uses black in the bottom half of the globe as opposed to the more standard royal blue. In July 2010, Pepsi began to change its North American branding of Pepsi Max to match the global branding, and rolled out a new slogan: "Zero Calories. Maximum Pepsi Taste". Since the rebranding, Pepsi Max has had a black livery as opposed to blue on regular Pepsi.

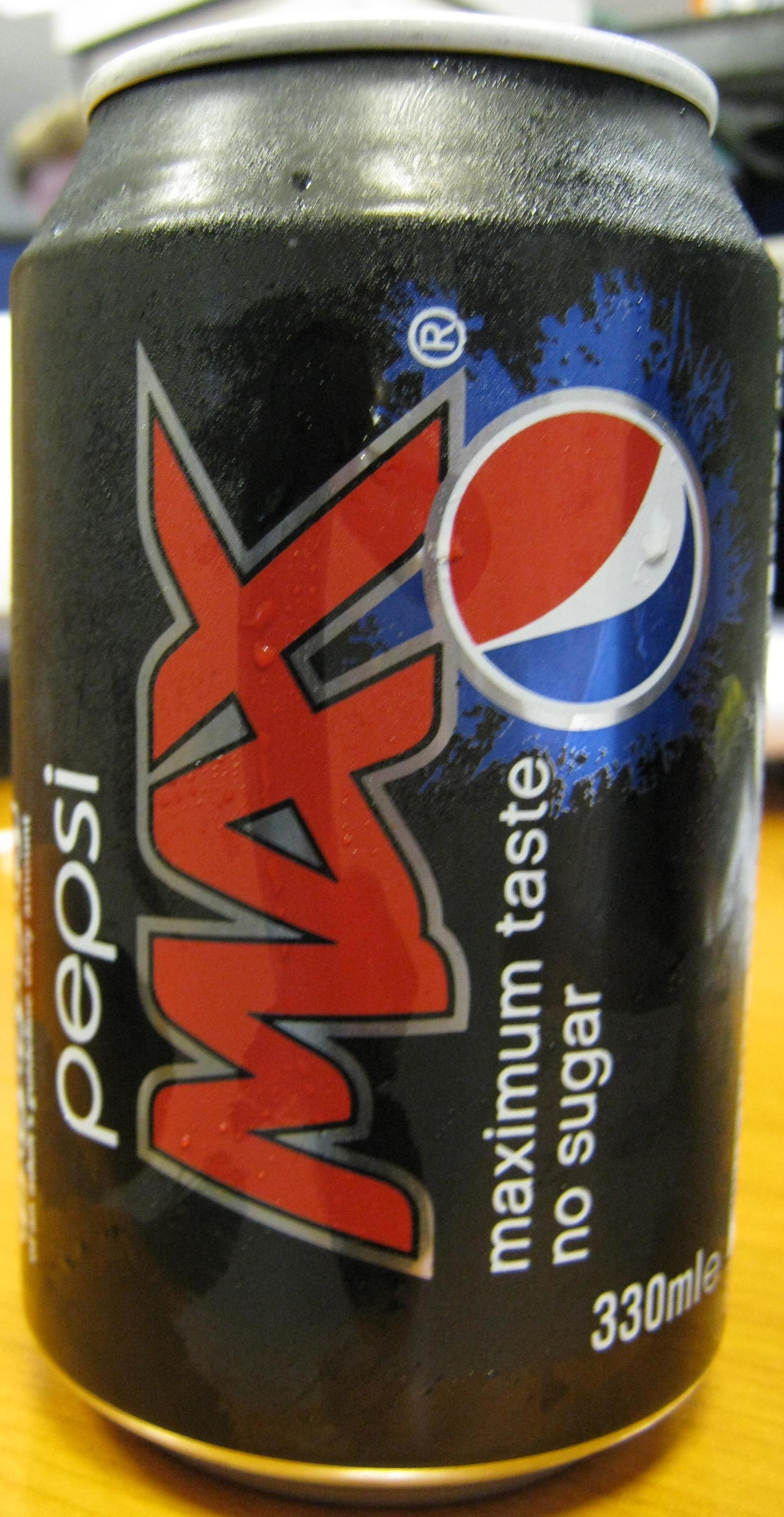
Can of Pepsi Max (2010 branding) with black livery

In 2023, Pepsi Max packaging was redesigned as part of a greater Pepsi rebranding. The updated packaging has a colour scheme of electric blue and black. In addition, in many countries the product was renamed to Pepsi Zero Sugar. This was done for transparency because many people did not understand that "Max" represented a sugar-free product. "Pepsi Max" continues to be the name of the product in Britain, Ireland, Scandinavia, Finland, Iceland, Tanzania and Australia, and "Pepsi Black" continues to be the name in Brazil, Mexico, Argentina, Malaysia, Singapore and others.

== Marketing ==
The original name was stylized as Pepsi MAX. Some of the taglines that PepsiCo have used in advertisements through various countries include: "Maximum taste, no sugar" (used since 1993), "Live life to the Max", and "Don't worry, there's no sugar". The company had attempted to appeal Pepsi Max to young men (in contrast to other diet cola drinks, which tend to target young women). Early advertisement had also incorporated extreme sports like abseiling. and in the 2000s PepsiCo launched new flavours, some of which (like the lemon-lime Pepsi Max Twist) targeted at women. Generally, the brand has been marketed with trends relevant to younger people.

Coca-Cola Zero, a rival sugar-free cola from The Coca-Cola Company, is marketed in a similar manner. Some Coke Zero advertising alluded to Pepsi Max, leading to a counter-campaign by Pepsi extolling the virtues of the concept of "maximum" over that of "zero". In 2007, the official marketing website for the product contained an 'odd cast' featuring a spoofed telethon urging viewers to donate yawns and uses the slogan 'WAKE UP PEOPLE'. Also, there was a featured commercial of a spoof on the Dallas Cowboys offensive coordinator yawning, when calling a play, thus, causing Tony Romo to be sacked, he was then replaced by Cowboys' owner Jerry Jones who gives him a Diet Pepsi Max. The scene then cuts away to the words "WAKE UP PEOPLE" while a voiceover shouts the slogan.

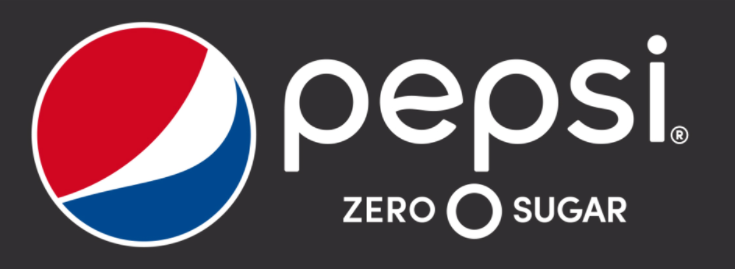
Logo used before re-branding in 2020. This logo was introduced in 2016.

In July 2010, Pepsi Max aired a reboot of a well-received ad that ran during the 1995 Super Bowl XXIX. In the original ad, a pair of delivery drivers from Coca-Cola and Pepsi began a tentative friendship while listening to "Get Together" by The Youngbloods; in a peace-making gesture, the two rivals taste each other's soda. But the friendship ends in humorous conflict when the Coca-Cola driver refuses to return the (superior) Pepsi product. The new ad riffed on the same story, with the drivers this time coming to blows over the then-Pepsi Max at the expense of Coca-Cola's much more popular Coke Zero, with the song "Why Can't We Be Friends?" by the American funk band War as the soundtrack. In 2011, Snoop Dogg was featured in an ad campaign around the time of Super Bowl XLV.

Richard Speight, Jr. is the "Pepsi Max" delivery guy for all commercials the last two years, with ads featuring major baseball and football stars, and also with Snoop Dogg and 4-time NASCAR Sprint Cup Series champion Jeff Gordon, who worked with Pepsi Max in 2013 to create Pepsi Max & Jeff Gordon Present: Test Drive, along with Road Trip to the Race Track two years prior. Pepsi Max also sponsored Gordon's Hendrick Motorsports teammate Kasey Kahne during the 2013 Cup Series season.

Pepsi sponsored the Super Bowl LI Halftime Show, naming it "The Pepsi Zero Sugar Super Bowl LI Halftime Show" with its headlining performer being American singer-songwriter Lady Gaga. This halftime show became the most watched Super Bowl halftime show in history.

Pepsi MAX was a founding partner of the Hill Dickinson Stadium, launching a five-year partnership to be the official soft drink supplier at the home stadium of Premier League side Everton.

== Flavour variants ==
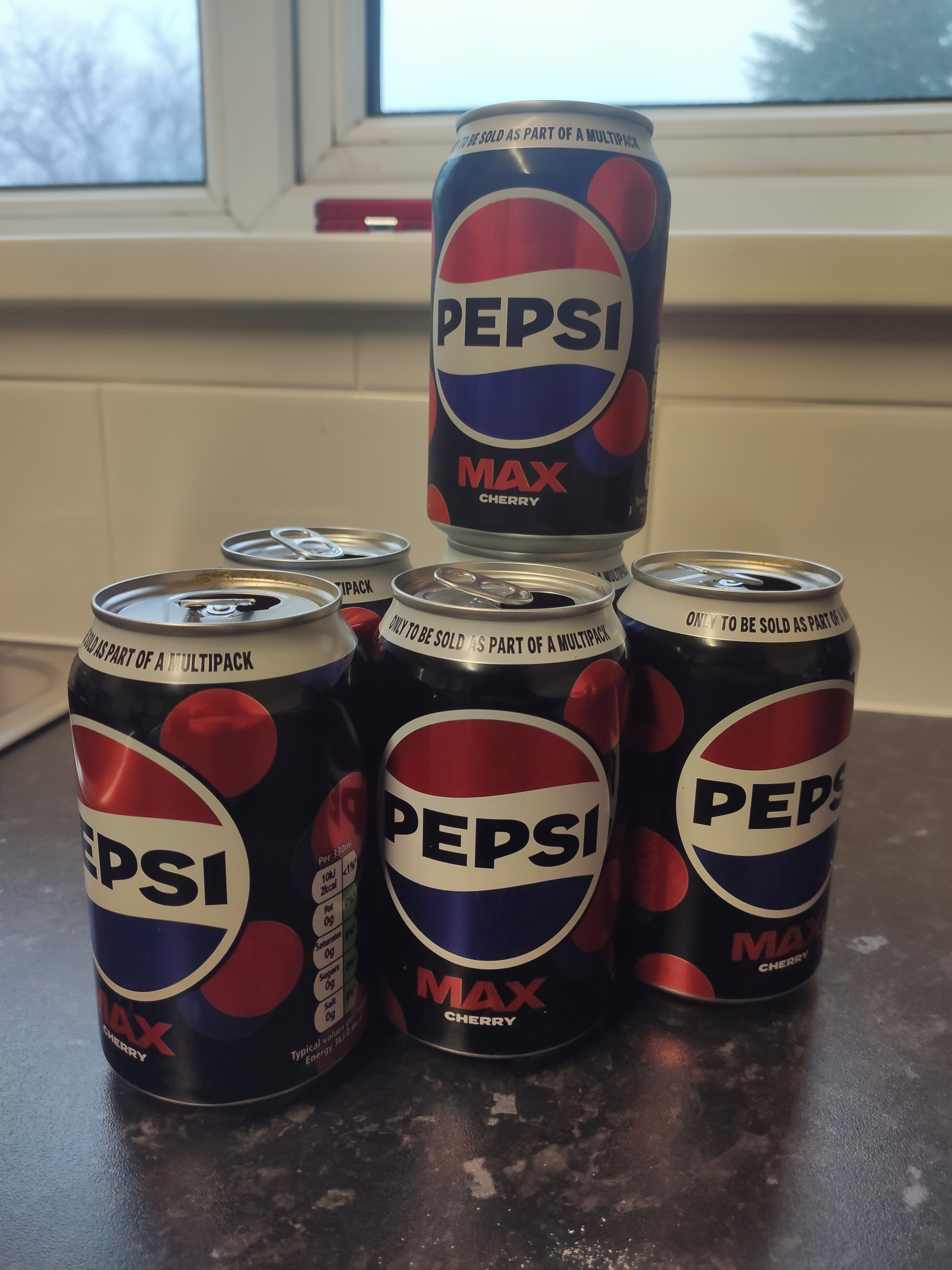
Cans of Pepsi Max Cherry

The Pepsi Max brand has seen many flavour variants and varieties across the world where the drink is marketed.

Name	Launched	Flavour	Regions where it is sold	Additional notes
Pepsi Max Lemon	2004	Lemon	Belgium; Norway; Sweden; The Netherlands; Germany; Australia	Was first sold in Belgium as Pepsi Max Cool Lemon before it was renamed in 2017.
Pepsi Max Lemon and Lime Twist	2005	Lemon/Lime	United Kingdom; France; Argentina; Brazil; Poland; Turkey	Was sold in France as Pepsi Max Citron Citron Vert.
Pepsi Max Punch	2005	Ginger and Cinnamon	United Kingdom	Sold as a limited edition during the 2005 Christmas Season. It is similar to the North American Pepsi Holiday Spice which was sold the year before and the year after.
Pepsi Max Gold	2006	Ginger	Finland	Sold as a limited edition alongside the regular Pepsi Gold for the 2006 FIFA World Cup.
Pepsi Max Coffee Cino	2006	Cappuccino/Coffee	United Kingdom; France; Portugal; Finland; Ireland; Norway	Prefigured by the similar Pepsi Kona (briefly test-marketed in the US in 1996) and Pepsi Tarik (released in Malaysia in 2005). Sold in France and Portugal as Pepsi Max Cappuccino.
Pepsi Max Chill	2007	Apple	Sweden; Finland	Sold as a limited edition in both countries in the Summer of 2007.
Pepsi Max Mojo	2008	Mojito Lime/Mint	Finland; Denmark	Was sold as a limited edition in 2008 in the former, and in 2009 in the latter under the name Pepsi Max Mojito.
Pepsi Max Energy	2008	Cola with 66% more caffeine	Germany	Was sold as a limited edition in 2008.
Pepsi Max Wild Side	2010	Wild Baobab	Sweden	Was sold as a limited edition in 2010.
Pepsi Max Lime	2011	Lime	Australia; United Kingdom; France; Lebanon; Finland; Sweden; Norway; Denmark; Iceland; Hungary; Romania; Poland; Serbia; Czech Republic; China; Poland; Portugal; Serbia; Spain; Thailand; Laos; Philippines; Vietnam; Kuwait; South Korea	Was first sold as Pepsi Max Cease Fire and Pepsi Max Citrus Freeze in Australia/New Zealand and the United Kingdom respectively in 2011 as part of a promotion with Doritos corn chips before being re-released in 2016 (as a limited edition) and 2021 respectively. Sold as Pepsi Black Lime in some countries.
Pepsi Max Cherry	2011	Cherry	United Kingdom; France; Netherlands; Denmark; Romania; Norway; Finland; Iceland; Germany; Russia	Was first released in the United Kingdom in June 2011, only at Asda stores in 2-liter bottles, and gained a wide release in 2012.
Pepsi Max Ginger	2017	Ginger	United Kingdom; Lebanon; Russia; Norway; Finland; The Netherlands; Denmark; Sweden; Germany	
Pepsi Max Vanilla	2018	Vanilla	Australia; New Zealand; Poland; Germany	Sold as Pepsi Black Vanilla in some countries
Pepsi Max Raspberry	2018	Raspberry	Australia; New Zealand; United Kingdom; Turkey; Sweden; France; Romania; Russia; Taiwan; Thailand; United Arab Emirates; Kuwait	Sold as Pepsi Black Raspberry in some countries
Pepsi Max Creaming Soda; Pepsi Max Cream Soda	2019	Cream Soda	Australia; Thailand; Egypt	
Pepsi Max Mango	2020	Mango	Australia; Hungary; Poland; Czech Republic; Serbia; Finland; Sweden; Denmark; Norway; Turkey; United Kingdom	Sold as Pepsi Black Mango in some countries
Pepsi Max Pineapple	2020	Pineapple	Hungary; Poland; Czech Republic; Romania; Serbia; Sweden; Australia; South Korea	
Pepsi Max No Caffeine	2021	Cola without Caffeine	United Kingdom; Finland	
Pepsi Max Strawberry	2021	Strawberry	Thailand; Laos; Egypt	
Pepsi Max Electric	2024	Citrus (blue coloured)	Denmark; Norway Sweden; United Kingdom; Poland; Thailand; Australia	Sold in the United Kingdom and Poland as a year-long limited edition under the name Pepsi Electric. It is similar to Pepsi Blue.
Pepsi Max Orange	2024	Orange	Thailand	Sold in Thailand under the name Pepsi Zero Sugar Orange.
Pepsi Max Lime No Caffeine	2024	Lime and Cola without Caffeine	South Korea	Sold in South Korea under the name Pepsi Zero Sugar Lime Zero Caffeine.
Pepsi Max Strawberries & Cream	2024	Strawberry and Cream Soda	United Kingdom; Thailand Germany	Sold under the name Pepsi Zero Sugar Strawberries & Cream.
Pepsi Max Cream Soda	2024	Cream Soda	United Kingdom Germany	
Pepsi Max Ume	2025	Ume	Thailand	Sold in Thailand under the name Pepsi Zero Sugar Ume.
Pepsi Max Tropical	2026	Pineapple, Mango and Peach	United Kingdom Finland	
Pepsi Max Dubai Chocolate	2026	Dubai Chocolate	Thailand	Sold in Thailand under the name Pepsi Zero Sugar Dubai Chocolate.
Pepsi Max Raspberry Ripple	2026	Raspberry	United Kingdom	Released In Early 2026 In The United Kingdom
Pepsi Max Cherry Vanilla	2026	Cherry and Vanilla	United Kingdom	Released In Early 2026 In The United Kingdom
Pepsi Max Salted Caramel	2026	Salted Caramel	United Kingdom	Released In Early 2026 In The United Kingdom

== See also ==
- List of energy drinks
- List of Pepsi variations
