= Clyde Carson =

American rapper (born 1981)

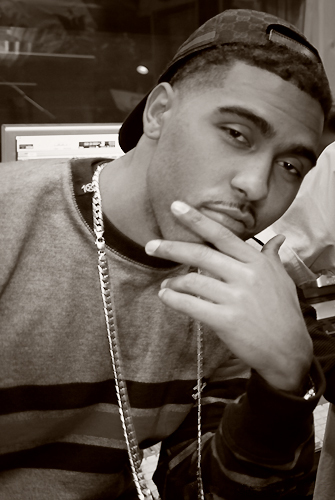
- Parrish in 2009

Background information
- Born: Nyle Kalin Parrish; June 2, 1982 (age 44)
- Origin: Oakland, California, U.S.
- Genre: West Coast hip-hop
- Occupations: Rapper; songwriter
- Works: Clyde Carson discography
- Years active: 2001–present
- Labels: Moe Doe; Black Wall Street; Capitol
- Formerly of: The Team
- Website: clydecarson.com

Nyle Kalin Parrish (born June 2, 1982), better known by his stage name Clyde Carson, is an American rapper. He formed the West Coast hip-hop trio the Team in 2001, with whom he has released four studio albums. After their third album World Premiere (2006), the group went on hiatus and Carson signed with fellow California-based rapper the Game's Black Wall Street Records, in a joint venture with Capitol Records to release his debut extended play Doin' That (2006).

Following his departure from both labels, he established the record label Moe Doe Entertainment to release his following EPs: Bass Rock (2009) and Playboy (2014). Carson remains best known for his 2012 single "Slow Down", which entered the Hot R&B/Hip-Hop Songs chart and was featured on the 2013 video game Grand Theft Auto V. Carson blends hyphy with street-styled rap.

== Career ==
Carson started his professional rapping career by selling his debut mixtape The Story Vol. 1 out of the trunk of his car in 2001. After sneaking backstage at a TRL concert he met producer Ty Fyffe, who he forged a close friendship with. Shortly after he moved to New York City with Ty Fyffe, staying there for almost a year. There he joined Fyffe to studio sessions with rappers such as Jay-Z and Cam'ron. This increased his confidence. On meeting, Fyffe he stated "I wanted to get up out of Oakland. This was before they were playing local music on the radio, other than E-40."

Then in 2002, Carson moved back to California and formed the hip hop group The Team, with local Bay Area rappers Mayne Mannish and Kaz Kyzah. They released a project on local rapper Keak da Sneak's record label and got put into local radio rotation. They then gained more popularity in late 2005 after releasing the singles "Just Go" and "Bottles Up" to promote their third studio album, World Premiere, which peaked at number 95 on the US Billboard Top R&B/Hip-Hop Albums chart, and number 50 on the Billboard Top Independent Albums chart. However the album was interminably delayed, blunting its impact.

With the help of rapper The Game and his Black Wall Street Records, Carson secured a major record label deal with Moedoe and Capitol Records in 2006. On his signing, he asserted "As a rapper, there's no ceiling in L.A. [like there is in the Bay]." He followed that by touring with The Game. Carson released his debut retail EP Doin' That on September 4, 2007., which was supported by the single "Doin' It" featuring Sean Kingston. Plans were then revealed for a debut album to be released by Black Wall Street and Capitol titled Theater Music, however it would be pushed back indefinitely. He explained the deal falling through by saying, "timing wasn't right", the person who signed him left the label and the studio head died.

However, Carson would not be officially released from Capitol until 2009. To celebrate his independence, Carson released his second EP Bass Rock on July 21, 2009, by Moe Doe Entertainment. It was released for digital download and made available in select record stores.

In December 2011, Carson reunited with The Team to record the song "Slow Down". Then on June 26, 2012, "Slow Down" was released as a single by Universal Music Group. Following its release, a DJ named J-12 invented a dance specifically for the song, inspiring dozens of kids to upload their own versions to YouTube. It peaked at number 21 on the US Billboard Rap Airplay chart and at number 28 on the Rhythmic chart. The remix would feature Gucci Mane, E-40, The Game, and Dom Kennedy in place of his The Team comrades. Off the strength of the song, The Team performed the song at Hot 97's Summer Jam. "Slow Down" would then be included on The Team's reunion EP, Hell of a Night. As it would turn out, the song would also be the first single from his second official mixtape S.T.S.A. (Something To Speak About). S.T.S.A. featured guest appearances by E-40, Iamsu!, Problem, and B-Legit. It was completely produced by The Team collaborator Sho Nuff. Following its release he began working on his next project.

He released the song "Pour Up" as the first single for his next EP on June 4, 2013. "Pour Up" would later be remixed with additional verses by The Game and Young Jeezy. Then for the rest of 2013 he would be featured on albums from other rappers, including The Game's OKE: Operation Kill Everything, E-40's The Block Brochure: Welcome to the Soil 6 and Ya Boy's Rich Rocka. Then on February 14, 2014, Carson released the music video for the EP song "Bring Em Out". Around the same time he placed his third solo EP Playboy available for pre-order on iTunes. On March 4, 2014, Carson released Playboy via Moe Doe Entertainment. It takes its name from the rapper Too Short's nickname Playboy Short. The EP contained production from DJ Mustard, League Of Starz, Dez Dynamic and Sho Nuff, with guest appearances including D-Lo, August Alsina and Master P. It was met with generally positive reviews. Jameel Raeburn of XXL said, "A lack of variety may be the main detractor for new listeners on Playboy EP, but overall the project is filled to the brim with tracks that slap. Clyde has carved himself a solid niche with his consistent party anthems, and Playboy is a strong soundtrack to his own player antics." Playboy peaked at number 23 on the US Billboard Heatseekers Albums chart. Carson was then featured on Master P's song "What the Business Is", which was released on April 4, 2014. Carson plans to release S.T.S.A. Part II and then go on tour in 2014.

== Discography ==
- S.T.S.A. 2 (Something To Speak About) (2017)
