= Ingrid Vandebosch =

Belgian model and actress (born 1970)

- Born: 8 November 1970 (age 55); Zichen-Zussen-Bolder, Limburg, Belgium
- Occupations: Actress, model
- Years active: 1986–present
- Spouse: Jeff Gordon (m. 2006)
- Children: Ella Sofia (b. 2007); Leo Benjamin (b. 2010)

Ingrid Vandebosch (born 8 November 1970) is a Belgian model and actress who won the Elite Look of the Year Award in 1990. She is married to the retired NASCAR driver Jeff Gordon.

== Modeling career ==
Vandebosch began her career in Belgium in 1986 and was discovered by Parisian agents one year later. She moved to Paris where she lived for seven years working on projects for Christian Dior perfume and appeared in magazines such as Elle, Marie Claire, Vogue and Glamour. Seeking new opportunities in modeling, as well as film and theatre, she later moved to New York City where she became the "face" of Artistry, a cosmetics line owned by Quixtar, a sister company of Amway. She had a small role in the 2004 film Taxi. Vandebosch appeared in Stuff magazine, in which she talked about her line of lingerie. She is also credited with a feature in the 2008 Sports Illustrated Swimsuit Issue.

== Personal life ==
Vandebosch married the NASCAR driver Jeff Gordon in a private ceremony in Mexico on 7 November 2006. The couple were introduced by a mutual friend in 2002, but did not start dating until about two and a half years later. They announced their engagement on 24 June 2006, after keeping it secret for the previous 30 days.

Vandebosch gave birth to their first child, a girl named Ella Sofia, on 20 June 2007, and their second, a boy named Leo Benjamin, on 9 August 2010.
