= List of Pepsi spokespersons =

Pepsi, the carbonated beverage, has had many advertising spokespersons over the years. PepsiCo's other drink brands, including Mountain Dew and Gatorade, also have a variety of famous spokespersons.

== History ==
=== United States ===
Joan Crawford was married to PepsiCo president Alfred Steele from 1955 to 1959 (his death), and was advertising executive and board of directors member from 1959 to 1973.

During the 1960s, Joanie Sommers sang two popular commercial songs ("It's Pepsi, for those who think young" and "Now you see it, now you don't, oh, Diet Pepsi") for Pepsi-Cola that were run in commercials and for which she came to be often referred to as "The Pepsi Girl."

In 1983, Michael Jackson signed a contract with Pepsi that produced many commercials and world tours through 1993.

In 1986 Michael J Fox appeared in the first of several Pepsi commercials. The first sees him as a student in a library using the power of suggestion to get himself a Pepsi. The second in 1987 sees Fox fight his way through traffic on a rainy night to get his new female neighbour a Diet Pepsi. This advert was also notable for its running time at being one minute and thirty seconds long and the music by Kenny Loggins. Fox's last Pepsi commercial was in 1990.

During the 1989 Grammy Awards telecast, Pepsi and Puerto Rican singer Chayanne was featured in the first advertising spot in Spanish to be broadcast on national television without dubbing or subtitles.

In the early 1990s, Ray Charles was the star of a Diet Pepsi campaign called "You Got the Right One, Baby," which was also known as "Uh-huh." Additionally, Cindy Crawford starred in Pepsi and Pepsi Stuff advertising.

Another Pepsi campaign from the late 1990s, "Joy of Cola," featured child star Hallie Eisenberg.

In 2000, Pepsi sponsored Kiss during their first Farewell Tour. The band filmed a commercial featuring Eisenberg in Kiss makeup.

In 2001, Britney Spears became a spokesperson for Pepsi. During her contract Spears did many commercials including ones for the World Cup and other major events. Spears' contract concluded with an advertisement with Pink, Beyoncé Knowles, and Enrique Iglesias. The ad was made featuring the cover of the song "We Will Rock You" by Queen set in a Roman gladiator arena.

In 2004, Beyoncé, Jennifer Lopez, and David Beckham all starred together in a commercial for the brand, featuring the two singers as assassin-like characters.

In 2005, Christina Aguilera was signed to promote the popular drink (she had previously promoted Coca-Cola in 2000). The campaign featuring Aguilera was released in 2006, but not in the United States. Some commercials featured singer Elissa, and some with Aguilera by herself. PepsiCo said in a recent interview that Christina Aguilera has that 'dare for more' approach. Aretha Franklin was also a spokesperson in 1998. In 1999 Janet Jackson signed on to the original "Ask For More" campaign which featured a song of the same name written and sung by Jackson.

In 2006, PepsiCo and Motorola launched the "Cool Tones" campaign. It featured Mariah Carey, Mary J. Blige and The All American Rejects writing and performing ringtones that could be obtained by purchasing a Pepsi bottle. The artists also filmed commercials for the campaign in which they performed their original ringtones.

In 2012, Beyoncé was signed once again to promote Pepsi. This campaign was her fifth for the soft drink since 2002 — and her face was on a limited-edition line of soda cans. The multiyear campaign was estimated at $50 million, the bulk of it for media placements and promotions around the world, and the remainder split roughly equally between Beyoncé’s fee and what Pepsi called a creative content development fund.

Nicki Minaj signed a promotional deal with Pepsi in February 2012. A commercial was released which included her hit single, "Moment 4 Life", on Sunday, May 6 at approximately 6:06 pm.

NASCAR driver Jeff Gordon was sponsored by Pepsi starting in 1997. The company sponsored Gordon in the Busch Series for two seasons. Since 2001, Pepsi has served as sponsor for Gordon in at least two races per season.

In 2013, New Orleans Saints quarterback Drew Brees and musical group One Direction co-starred in a Pepsi commercial.

=== Europe and the United Kingdom ===
In 1988, Robert Palmer did a Pepsi commercial with his hit single "Simply Irresistible".

For the 1988 and 1989 seasons, Pepsi was the title sponsor of Suzuki's effort in motorcycle road racing's premier class, Grand Prix 500cc. The Pepsi livery was a new addition to grand prix motorcycling, and a change from tobacco sponsors. Suzuki also produced a number of road going replicas of the GP bikes, emblazoned with the same Pepsi signage as the works bikes. Due to the livery's association with one of Suzuki's riders, the Texan, Kevin Schwantz, riders today are still producing their own replicas as tribute.

During the late 1990s the Spice Girls became the face of Pepsi with the tagline “Generation Next,” inspired by their song "Move Over" from their album Spiceworld. Promotion included TV commercials, CD singles for the promo single "Step to Me," and collectible cans and glasses with each Spice Girl on a different can or cup.

Since 2001, Sakis Rouvas has been a spokesperson in the Greek and Balkan campaign under contract with the headquarters of United Kingdom, being the only Greek artist to have ever been proposed to represent the brand.

Since summer 2009, Inna is the spokeswoman in Romania, Moldova and secondly in Bulgaria, Hungary and Serbia. She promoted Pepsi mostly in Romania, Moldova and Bulgaria through TV commercials and internet adverts. Some commercials have been translated from Romanian into Bulgarian or even Hungarian.

=== Latin America ===
In Latin America, Colombian artists Shakira, and Juanes. Mexican Julieta Venegas, Dominican Sammy Sosa, and Puerto Rican Ricky Martin and Daddy Yankee have promoted the soft drink. Spanish-speaking Jaci Velasquez did some commercials. In 2007 RBD promoted the drink in their home country of Mexico.

=== Asia ===
As for Asia markets, celebrity, actors and singers Siti Nurhaliza, Show Lo, Leslie Cheung, Jay Chou, Aaron Kwok, Jolin Tsai, Ivy, Rain, Derrick Hamilton, Louis Koo, Nicholas Tse, F4, Faye Wong, Jennylyn Mercado, Kelly Chan, Momo Wu, Bamboo Mañalac, Eraserheads, Jericho Rosales, Matteo Guidicelli, Nicole Hernandez, G.E.M. Tang, Jackson Wang, Jao Mapa, Daniel Padilla, Julia Barretto, Kathryn Bernardo, Donny Pangilinan, Belle Mariano and SB19 have appeared in several different advertisements.

In Pakistan, Pepsi sponsors the Pakistan cricket team and many Pakistani celebrities and personalities have been spokespersons for the brand including Hadiqa Kiani, Junaid Jamshed, Shoaib Akhtar, Bob Woolmer, Younus Khan, Kamran Akmal, Adnan Sami, Reema Khan, Call, and Vital Signs.

In India, Pepsi first used Aamir Khan, model turned actress Mahima Chaudhary and model and ex-Miss World Aishwariya Rai to promote its product. Later it used Amitabh Bachchan, Shahrukh Khan, Kajol, Rani Mukherjee, Manisha Koirala, Saif Ali Khan, Fardeen Khan, Akshay Kumar, Shahid Kapoor (before he entered the movie world), Preity Zinta, John Abraham, Tara Sharma, Vatsal Sheth, Pawan Kalyan, Tulip Joshi, Ram Charan Teja, Priyanka Chopra, and Kareena Kapoor as well as the national cricket team. Ranbir Kapoor and Deepika Padukone were signed for Pepsi's Youngistan campaign which targeted the youth.

=== Australia ===
In Australia, the trend has been to use local Australian celebrities to promote Pepsi including Kylie Minogue, Jennifer Hawkins (Miss Universe 2004), Holly Valance, Harry Kewell, Delta Goodrem, Mark Philippoussis and several others including New Zealander Sonny Bill Williams

== Spokesperson issues ==
The first international popstar to become a spokesperson for Pepsi was Michael Jackson, who along with his brothers (The Jacksons) advertised Pepsi for "the new generation" in an advertisement featuring a reworking of his song "Billie Jean". However, while filming a second advertisement in 1984, a pyrotechnics stunt went wrong, resulting in Jackson suffering second- and third-degree burns on his head and parts of his face. Jackson sued PepsiCo for damages; PepsiCo settled out of court, with Jackson donating the US$1.5 million settlement to the Brotman Medical Center, where he was treated for his injuries. PepsiCo dropped Jackson in 1993 amidst his sexual abuse allegations.

In 1987, David Bowie and Tina Turner joined forces to advertise the soft drink, in an advertisement featuring a reworking of Bowie's hit "Modern Love." The company also agreed to sponsor Bowie's 1987 Glass Spider World Tour. Bowie was accused of sexual assault shortly afterwards, and the company dropped the advertisements immediately. Two years later, Pepsi's attempts to make Madonna a new Pepsi spokesperson ended with the infamous "Like a Prayer" incident when Madonna's video brought charges of anti-Catholicism to the company.

In August 2002, Pepsi pulled a national, 30-second commercial featuring multiplatinum rapper Ludacris from the air after Fox's Bill O'Reilly called for a boycott of the soft drink company. O'Reilly characterized Pepsi as "immoral" for using the rapper, whom he described as a "rap thug." O'Reilly referenced several of Ludacris's lyrics, which he said emphasized a lifestyle that included getting intoxicated, selling drugs, fighting people, and degrading women. The issue resurfaced when Pepsi began to run ads with The Osbournes, a move that Russell Simmons, head of the Hip Hop Summit Action Network categorized as racially insensitive. The company maintained that Ludacris was an inappropriate spokesman because of his usage of language, but Simmons and the HHSAN contended that the Osbournes use of language was just as unacceptable. The final accord reached between the two parties had Pepsi make an annual contribution of $1 million to the Ludacris Foundation (an organization that helps middle and high school students motivate themselves in creative arts) for three years. In addition, the HHSAN helped Pepsi find other community-based organizations to support. Simmons made it clear that he would not accept any money for any charitable organization that he was involved in. While Pepsi offered to shoot a new series of ads on hip-hop history with Ludacris, the rapper declined and additionally stated through Simmons that he did not want his previous ads to re-air.

According to allhiphop.com, in 2005, a rumor spread that the newest spokesperson for Pepsi, Kanye West, was dropped after a comment made against President George W. Bush. Nicole Bradley, public relations manager of Pepsi, clarified that the company's relationship with West had not changed and their marketing will continue as planned.

In 2017, PepsiCo released “Live for Now”, a short film commercial starring model and television personality Kendall Jenner. The advertisement received online backlash, with Pepsi and Jenner being accused of trivializing Black Lives Matter and police brutality. The ad was pulled after only a day, and Pepsi released a statement apologizing for “making light of any serious issue.”
