= Debate show =

Television show genre based around a debate

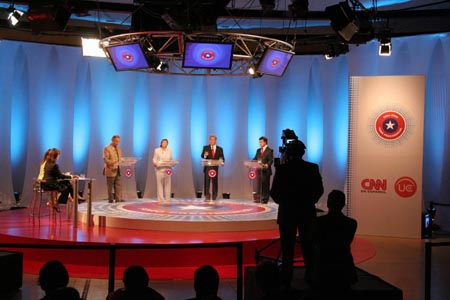
A televised debate held during the 2005 Chilean presidential elections.

A debate show is a television show genre based around a debate. Usually, it is hosted by a moderator.

== Examples ==
In the United States, Crossfire was a current events debate television program that aired from 1982 to 2005 on CNN. Crossballs: The Debate Show on Comedy Central parodied Crossfire and other shows of its ilk.

The Debaters is a Canadian radio comedy show in which two debaters (usually stand up comedians) debate topics, which are deliberately comedic (such as "backseat drivers are helpful", "gravity is our friend" and "cats are smarter than dogs". The winner is chosen by audience applause at the end of the debate.

Sports-oriented channels in the United States—particularly ESPN and Fox Sports 1—have been known for carrying debate shows during the daytime hours, often featuring sportswriters and other personalities discussing sports news and developments. ESPN had several notable debate programs; in 2004, the network premiered Around the Horn, which used a panel game show-like format where multiple panelists from across the country discussed sports-related topics in various rounds, with the host awarding points to the panelists based upon the strengths of their arguments. In 2011, under executive Jamie Horowitz, ESPN's morning show First Take was retooled into a debate-driven program—a move that led to a major increase in viewership. In 2015, Horowitz departed to Fox Sports 1, where he would install similar formats in its daytime programming.

The Arena was a show aired in Singapore from 2007 to 2008 that featured secondary school teams debating each other.
