= North American Rotorwerks Pitbull Ultralight =

American homebuilt autogyro

Pitbull Ultralight

General information
- Type: Autogyro
- National origin: United States
- Manufacturer: North American Rotorwerks
- Status: Production suspended (2013)

History
- Variant: North American Rotorwerks Pitbull II

The North American Rotorwerks Pitbull Ultralight is an American autogyro, designed and produced by North American Rotorwerks of Tukwila, Washington. When it was available the aircraft was supplied as a kit for amateur construction, but by 2013 production had been suspended.

== Design and development ==
The Pitbull Ultralight was designed to comply with the US FAR 103 Ultralight Vehicles rules, including the category's maximum empty weight of 254 lb (115 kg), although the aircraft has a standard empty weight of 260 lb (118 kg). It features a single main rotor, a single-seat open cockpit with a windshield, conventional landing gear and a twin cylinder, air-cooled, two-stroke, single-ignition 40 hp (30 kW) Rotax 447 engine in tractor configuration. The dual ignition 50 hp (37 kW) Rotax 503 and the Subaru EA81 automotive conversion are both optional.

The aircraft fuselage is made from bolted-together square aluminum tubing, with the engine mount made from 6061-T6 aluminium. The down-struts are made from 4130 steel tubing. Its 23.6 ft (7.2 m) diameter Fleck rotor has a chord of 7 in (17.8 cm) and is made from extruded aluminum. The landing gear is made from 4130 steel tubing and the tailplane is strut-braced. An electric pre-rotator is standard, while a bubble canopy for year-round flying is optional. With its empty weight of 260 lb (118 kg) and a gross weight of 500 lb (227 kg), the useful load is 240 lb (109 kg).

The aircraft is intended to resemble the autogyros of the 1930s and as such it uses a radial engine-style round cowling, rounded rudder, barrel-shaped fuselage and other antique styling details.

== Operational history ==
By January 2013 five examples had been registered in the United States with the Federal Aviation Administration.

== Variants ==
Pitbull Ultralight
Base model with 40 hp (30 kW) Rotax 447 or the 50 hp (37 kW) Rotax 503 engine. Installed power can be from 38 to 52 hp (28 to 39 kW). Estimated construction time from the factory-supplied assembly kit is 50 hours.
Pitbull SS
Higher powered model for the Experimental - amateur-built category, with 64 hp (48 kW) Rotax 582 or an 85 hp (63 kW) Subaru engine. Installed power can be from 50 to 85 hp (37 to 63 kW). Empty weight of 290 lb (132 kg) and a gross weight of 610 lb (277 kg), the useful load is 320 lb (145 kg). Estimated construction time from the factory-supplied assembly kit is 80 hours.

== Specifications (Pitbull Ultralight) ==
Data from Bayerl and North American Rotorwerks

General characteristics

- Crew: one
- Length: 13 ft 5 in (4.09 m)
- Width: 5 ft 10 in (1.78 m)
- Height: 8 ft 0 in (2.44 m)
- Empty weight: 260 lb (118 kg)
- Gross weight: 500 lb (227 kg)
- Fuel capacity: 6 U.S. gallons (23 L; 5.0 imp gal)
- Powerplant: 1 × Rotax 447 twin cylinder, air-cooled, two stroke aircraft engine, 40 hp (30 kW)
- Main rotor diameter: 23 ft 6 in (7.16 m)
- Propellers: 2-bladed wooden

Performance

- Maximum speed: 80 mph (130 km/h, 70 kn)
- Cruise speed: 65 mph (105 km/h, 56 kn)
- Rate of climb: 890 ft/min (4.5 m/s)
