= You Got the Right One, Baby =

Diet Pepsi advertising slogan

"You Got the Right One, Baby, Uh Huh" was a popular slogan for PepsiCo's Diet Pepsi brand in the United States and Canada from 1990 to 1993. In January 1991, PepsiCo started airing TV commercials for Diet Pepsi featured Ray Charles surrounded by models, singing a song entitled "You Got the Right One, Baby, Uh Huh." The tag-phrase of the song included the words "Uh Huh!", which, as part of the ad campaign, were featured on Diet Pepsi packaging. Later, after Diet Pepsi phased out the aspartame / saccharin mix in favor of a 100% aspartame formula, many commercials ended with an announcer saying, "With 100% Uh Huh" replacing the earlier "With 100% NutraSweet."

The advertising campaign was created for Pepsi by BBD&O, a major New York advertising agency, and the song used in the commercials, entitled "Ray's Song" was penned by the team at Sunday Productions, also of New York City. One of the commercials was directed by Joe Pytka.

Prince's recording of his track 'Uh Huh' has often led to the mistaken belief that Prince wrote the jingle used in the commercials.

The song was written by Diet Pepsi creative director Alfred Merrin and writer Peter Cofield, with some input from Charles' backing singers The Raelettes.

== Legal issues ==
Ventriloquist Arthur Takeall, Sr. claimed copyright infringement of the phrase "You Got the Right One, Uh-Huh" against Pepsico.

Takeall performed a series of radio shows where he and his dummy "Scooter" had a catchphrase "You Got the Right One, Uh-Huh." From 1970 until 1983, he did some stand-up performances, nightclub entertainment, and eventually appeared at the 1984 Louisiana World Exposition using the catchphrase. Post-1984, he also performed in Job Corps events and in schools and eventually filed for a copyright of his ventriloquist performance in January 1992. Takeall alleged that he sent several promotional packages in hopes of corporate sponsorship to various Pepsi executives in the late 80s, which may have been where Pepsi gained access to the catchphrase.

Takeall filed suit on March 17, 1993, seeking damages for copyright infringement of his phrase, but the district court granted summary judgment in favor of Pepsi. Takeall appealed the decision, but the appellate court affirmed summary judgment on December 8, 1993.

Takeall since became the owner of a federal trademark for "You Got the Right One, Baby, Uh Huh."

== Indian version ==
The Indian variant of the slogan is "Yeh hi hai right choice, Baby, A-ha" ("This is the Right Choice, Baby") in Hinglish. The slogan became immensely popular in the 1990s and has since become a catchphrase in Indian popular culture.

Pepsi launched in India on 1989. Their first commercial utilizing the new slogan featured pop star Remo Fernandes and actress Juhi Chawla and was released in 1992. This ad was a remake of a 1987 Michael J. Fox Diet Pepsi commercial. After the original commercial, Pepsi began their "right choice" campaign, introducing more commercials into their international advertising.Several commercials were directed by Indian director Mukul Anand and featured celebrities such as Remo Fernandes, Penny Vaz, Kapil Dev, Aamir Khan, Mahima Chaudhry, and Aishwariya Rai

== In popular culture ==
The song's title quickly became a catchphrase across North America, and was referenced in various television shows and movies of the time, including The Cosby Show, Foofur, The Fresh Prince of Bel-Air, Coneheads and Rookie of the Year. The commercials themselves played on the parodies. One series of commercials showed people who opened cans of Diet Pepsi being thanked by Ray Charles and his backup singers with an "uh huh" (or the occasion "uh uh" for people who drank diet sodas from rival companies). Another commercial showed unsuccessful auditions with gangsta rappers, heavy metal bands and opera singers participating in a contest all singing "You Got The Right One Baby", in their most original format. A cash prize would be awarded to the best original rendition of "You Got The Right One Baby, uh huh". Over 300,000 videos were submitted, to that extent Diet Pepsi awarded 10 first place prizes to the best and most original renditions. There was also a parody on Animaniacs in Chalkboard Bungle.

== See also ==
- Catchphrase
- Pepsi
