= Tradin' Paint =

Two 2000s television series

Tradin' Paint is the name of two separate television programs on the U.S.-based cable network Speed Channel.

In 2003, Tradin' Paint was the name of a one-hour special program where 4-time NASCAR Winston Cup champion Jeff Gordon and former CART champion and Formula One driver Juan Pablo Montoya traded race cars and drove around the Indianapolis Motor Speedway Formula One race course. The show was hosted by Bob Varsha, along with Fox Sports's NASCAR commentator Larry McReynolds and Speed's Formula One commentator Steve Matchett.

From 2006 to 2009, Tradin' Paint was the name of a weekly discussion program broadcast from each week's NASCAR Cup Series venue. In 2009, it was announced that the series would not return for another season.
