= North American Rotorwerks Pitbull II =

American autogyro

Pitbull II

General information
- Type: Autogyro
- National origin: United States
- Manufacturer: North American Rotorwerks
- Status: Production suspended (2013)

History
- Variant: North American Rotorwerks Pitbull Ultralight

The North American Rotorwerks Pitbull II is an American autogyro, designed and produced by North American Rotorwerks of Tukwila, Washington. When it was available the aircraft was supplied as a kit for amateur construction, but by 2013 production had been suspended.

== Design and development ==
The Pitbull II is a two-seat development of the North American Rotorwerks Pitbull Ultralight. It was designed to comply with the US Experimental - Amateur-built rules. It features a single main rotor, a two-seats in side-by-side configuration open cockpit with a windshield, conventional landing gear and a four-cylinder, air and liquid-cooled, four-stroke, dual-ignition 100 hp (75 kW) Rotax 912S engine in tractor configuration. The 110 hp (82 kW) Subaru EA-81 and Subaru EA-82 auto-conversion powerplants are optional.

The aircraft's rotor has a 30 ft (9.1 m) diameter and the cockpit has a 40 in (102 cm) width. The tailplane is strut-braced and an electric pre-rotator is standard. A small baggage compartment with a capacity of 20 lb (9.1 kg) and a volume of 2 cu ft (56.6 L) is fitted. The recommended power range is 90 to 160 hp (67 to 119 kW). With its empty weight of 440 lb (200 kg) and a gross weight of 1,025 lb (465 kg), the useful load is 585 lb (265 kg). Construction time from the factory assembly kit is estimated at 100 hours.

The aircraft is intended to resemble the autogyros of the 1930s and as such it uses a radial engine-style round cowling, rounded rudder, barrel-shaped fuselage and other antique styling details.

== Specifications (Pitbull II) ==
Data from Bayerl and North American Rotorwerks

General characteristics

- Crew: one
- Capacity: one passenger
- Length: 15 ft 5 in (4.70 m)
- Height: 8 ft 5 in (2.57 m)
- Empty weight: 440 lb (200 kg)
- Gross weight: 1,025 lb (465 kg)
- Fuel capacity: 18 U.S. gallons (68 L; 15 imp gal)
- Powerplant: 1 × Rotax 912S four cylinder, air and liquid-cooled, four stroke aircraft engine, 100 hp (75 kW)
- Main rotor diameter: 30 ft 0 in (9.14 m)
- Propellers: 3-bladed composite

Performance

- Maximum speed: 88 mph (142 km/h, 76 kn)
- Cruise speed: 70 mph (110 km/h, 61 kn)
- Range: 210 mi (340 km, 180 nmi)
- Service ceiling: 12,000 ft (3,700 m)
- Rate of climb: 1,200 ft/min (6.1 m/s)
