= The Team (group) =

American hip hop group

- Origin: Oakland, California
- Genres: Hip hop, Hyphy
- Labels: Moe Doe Entertainment
- Members: Clyde Carson; Mayne Mannish; Kaz Kyzah

The Team is a hip hop group from Bay Area and Oakland, California. The group consists of four emcees: Clyde Carson, Mayne Mannish, and Kaz Kyzah and also one affiliated member named Jungle. They are associated with West Coast hip hop music, and have a unique sound that showcases the diversity of hyphy music. The group is best known for their local hits "It's Gettin' Hot" (2004) and "Hyphy Juice (The Remix)" (2006). The Team re-gained popularity in late 2005 after releasing the singles "Just Go" and "Bottles Up" to promote their new album, World Premiere, which peaked at number 95 on the Billboard Top R&B/Hip-Hop Albums, and number 50 on the Billboard Top Independent Albums. They are known for their song "Slow Down", which was featured in the 2013 video game Grand Theft Auto V.

Member Clyde Carson has since broken as a solo artist. He has come out with many singles including "Slow Down", "Secret Lover", "Tuk Spot", and "Pour Up", and has featured in songs with rappers such as Andre Nickatina, E-40, Baby Bash, Roach Gigz, The Game, and Too $hort.

== Discography ==
- 2002: Beyond The Glory (re-released in 2004 as The Preseason)
- 2004: The Negro League
- 2006: World Premiere
- 2012: Hell of A Night EP
- 2016: Hell of A Night 2
- 2024: Rellies

=== Solo discography ===
Clyde Carson

- 2001: The Story Vol. 1
- 2007: Doin' That EP
- 2009: Bass Rock EP
- 2012: Something to Speak About
- 2014: Playboy EP
- 2016: Time
- 2017: S.T.S.A. 2 (Something to Speak About)
- 2017: Profilin EP
- 2018: Summer Wave EP
- 2019: Late Night Money High
- 2020: Fast Lane
- 2021: Summer Wave 2 EP
- 2022: Full Thortle
- 2023: 80 West EP
- 2023: Gotta Feel Me
- 2023: A New Year

Kaz Kyzah

- 2006: The Go-Fessional
- 2007: Kyzah Kollection

Mayne Mannish

- 2015: "Guilty Pleasure"
