= World Premiere (The Team album) =

Studio album by The Team
- Released: April 4, 2006 (U.S.)
- Recorded: 2006
- Genre: Hip-hop, hyphy, West Coast hip-hop
- Length: 65:02
- Label: Moe Doe Entertainment/Koch
- Producer: K.O.A.B & The Team

The Team chronology
| The Negro League (2004) | World Premiere (2006) | Hell of a Night 2 (2016) |

World Premiere is the third studio album by Oakland rap group The Team, released on April 4, 2006. It peaked at number 95 on the Billboard Top R&B/Hip-Hop Albums chart and number 50 on the Billboard Top Independent Albums chart.

== Track listing ==
1. "Let's Go Team!" — 2:28
2. "Bottles Up" — 3:35
3. "On One" — 4:50
4. "Top of the World" — 3:52
5. "Touch the Sky" — 3:43
6. "Just Go" — 3:36
7. "Hyphy Juice" — 3:22
8. "Good Girl" (featuring Angelina) — 3:38
9. "It's Getting Hot" — 3:39
10. "Stuntin' on Ya" — 3:54
11. "Addiction" — 3:36
12. "Summertime in the Town" — 4:05
13. "Ambassadors Night" — 3:10
14. "I'm a Player" (featuring D'wayne Wiggins) — 4:55
15. "The Definition" — 1:06
16. "Sunshine" (featuring Goapele) — 4:13
17. "It's Getting Hot [Town Bizznezz Remix]" (featuring Keak Da Sneak, The Delinquents, Richie Rich, Humpty Hump, Too Short, and MC Hammer) — 7:18

== Personnel ==
- Executive Producers: K.O.A.B. & The Team
- A&R: K.O.A.B. & The Team
- A&R Administration: Taj Mahal
- Project Management: Lee Hayes
- Marketing: K.O.A.B
- Art Direction & Design: Brian Bradley Designs
- Cover Photography: Michael Sexton Photography
- Inside Photography: Kimara Dixon
- Pro-Tools & Sequence Editing: Larry Funk at Funktonics
- Mastered by: Chris Athens at Sterling Sound, NYC
- Legal Council: Roxanne Fritz esq.
