= List of programs broadcast by Speed =

The following is a list of programs formerly broadcast by American and Australian television channel, Speed.

== Final programming ==
=== Sports programming ===
==== Racing series ====
- AMA Grand National Cross Country
- AMA Arenacross
- AMA Superbike
- AMA Supercross
- American Le Mans Series
- ARCA Racing Series presented by Menards
- Championship Off Road Racing
- Continental Tire Sports Car Challenge
- FIM MotoGP World Championship
- FIM Superbike World Championship
- Formula D
- German Touring Car Championship (one-hour broadcasts during the winter months)
- GP2 Series
- IHRA
- IndyCar Series (Australia only)
- Lucas Oil Late Model Dirt Series
- Lucas Oil Off Road Racing Series
- Monster Jam
- MSA British Touring Car Championship (one-hour broadcasts during the winter months)
- NASCAR Camping World Truck Series (branded under NASCAR on Fox)
- NASCAR K&N Pro Series East and West (branded under NASCAR on Fox)
- NASCAR Nationwide Series (branded under NASCAR on Fox)
- NASCAR Sprint Cup Series (Budweiser Duel at Daytona & Sprint All-Star Race; branded under NASCAR on Fox)
- Porsche Racing Series
- Rolex Sports Car Series
- V8 Supercar Series (Australia) - shown Spring to Summer in the Northern Hemisphere
- Volkswagen Jetta TDI Cup
- World of Outlaws

==== Other events ====
- English Premier League Soccer
- Spanish La Liga Soccer

=== News and talk programming ===
- MotorWeek
- NASCAR Live!
- NASCAR Race Hub
- NASCAR RaceDay
- NASCAR Trackside
- NASCAR Victory Lane
- SPEED Center

=== Series programming ===
- The 10
- American Thunder
- American Trucker
- Barrett-Jackson: the Auctions
- Barrett-Jackson LIFE on the BLOCK
- Battle of the Supercars
- Car Crazy
- Car Science
- The Car Show
- Car Warriors
- Chop Cut Rebuild
- Dangerous Drives
- Drag Race High
- Dumbest Stuff On Wheels
- Ferrari Legends and Passions (Ferrari Leggenda E Passione)
- Intersections
- Jacked: Auto Theft Task Force
- KIT: An Autobody Experience
- Livin' the Low Life
- Lucas Oil on the Edge
- My Classic Car
- My Ride Rules
- NASCAR Performance
- NCWTS Setup (originally NCTS Setup)
- Pass Time
- Pimp My Ride
- Pinks!
- PINKS All Out
- PINKS All Outtakes
- Pumped!
- Ship Shape TV
- SPEED Test Drive
- SPEED Test Ride
- Stacey David's Gearz
- Stealth Rider
- Stuntbusters
- SuperCars Exposed
- Truck Universe
- Two Guys Garage
- Ultimate Factories
- Unique Whips
- WindTunnel with Dave Despain
- Wrecked: Life in the Crash Lane

=== Specials ===
- 24 Hours of Le Mans
- Barrett-Jackson Collector Car Auction
- Bathurst 1000 (live instead of highlights)
- Bristol Motor Speedway speed trials
- Budweiser Duel
- Budweiser Selection show (Drivers drew their starting spot for the Budweiser Shootout)
- Nascar Pennzoil Victory Challenge
- Nascar Pit Stop Challenge
- Knoxville Nationals
- Race of Champions
- Rolex Monterey Motorsports Reunion (select classes)
- Sahlen's Six Hours of The Glen
- SCCA National Championship Runoffs
- Sprint All-Star Race (2007–present; branded under NASCAR on Fox)
- The 10 Nascar Top 10 count down show
- The Day, an hour-long Nascar documentary that went over subjects such as the 2001 Daytona 500, the 1984 Firecracker 400, the 1992 Hooters 500, and the 2012 Daytona 500.
- The Roast of Kevin Harvick
- UNOH Battle at the Beach

== Former programming ==
=== Sports programming ===
==== Racing series ====
- American Le Mans Series – transferred to ESPN and ABC; became United SportsCar Racing in 2014 and broadcast on Fox Sports 1
- American Speed Association
- Champ Car (2002–2006)
- European Touring Car Championship
- Formula One – given to NBC Sports
- IMSA GT Championship – SPEED showed its successor, the ALMS, until 2011 as well as the spinoff RSCS
- IndyCar Series (USA; IRL qualifying and the 1999 VisionAire 500K)
- REV-OIL Pro Cup Series
- Speed World Challenge (now on NBC Sports Network)
- Star Mazda Series
- Summer Shootout (during the winter months only)
- Toyota All-Star Showdown (cancelled in 2011)
- Trans-Am Series
- World Rally Championship
- World Series of Off-Road Racing
- World Touring Car Championship

=== Series programming ===
- 101 Cars You Must Drive
- 7 Days
- American Muscle Car
- Autoline Detroit
- AutoWeek on Speedvision/SPEED
- Back in the Day
- Barrett-Jackson Car Search
- Behind the Headlights
- Big Shots: Titans at the Tee
- Build or Bust
- Cars at Carlisle
- The Chase Is On
- Corbin's Ride On
- Darrell Waltrip Celebrity Blackjack
- Dream Car Garage
- Epic Ride
- Fast Track To Fame
- Fifth Gear
- Fine Tuned
- For the Love of Racing
- Formula 1 Debrief
- Formula 1 Decade
- Forza Motorsport Showdown
- Hot Import Nights
- I Wanna Date a Race Car Driver
- Indy 500: The Classics
- Inside Grand Prix
- Inside NBS
- Inside Nextel Cup
- Launch Hour
- Legends of Motorsport
- Lost Drive-In
- Men Behind the Wrenches
- Motorsports Mundial
- NASCAR Classics
- NASCAR in a Hurry
- NASCAR Nation
- NASCAR Past Champions
- NASCAR Smarts
- NBS 24/7
- NOPI Tunervision
- Overhaulin'
- Payback
- Pit Bull
- The Racing Chef
- The Reality of SPEED
- Redline TV
- Shooting Cars
- SPEED News
- Speed Racer
- The SPEED Report
- Sports Car Revolution
- Street Tuner Challenge
- Texas Hardtails
- This Week in NASCAR
- Totally NASCAR
- Tuner Transformation
- Two Wheel Tuesday
- V-Twin Motorcycles TV
- Victory by Design
- The World's Greatest Auto Shows

=== Specials ===
- Rolex 24 at Daytona – Fox Sports aired the first 90 minutes of the Rolex 24 at Daytona (2007–2009)
