= 2015 MAVTV 500 =

IndyCar race held at Fontana, California

Coordinates: 34.08858°N 117.50000°W

(United States) 2015 MAVTV 500
Race details
11th round of the 2015 IndyCar Series season
← Previous race	Next race →
- Layout of the Auto Club Speedway
- Date: June 27, 2015
- Official name: MAVTV 500
- Location: Auto Club Speedway, Fontana, California
- Course: Permanent racing facility 2.000 mi / 3.219 km
- Distance: 250 laps 500.000 mi / 804.672 km
- Weather: 89 °F (32 °C), dry, overcast

Pole position
- Driver: (France) Simon Pagenaud (Team Penske)
- Time: 1:05.7679

Fastest lap
- Driver: (Japan) Takuma Sato (A. J. Foyt Enterprises)
- Time: 33.0027 (on lap 229 of 250)

Podium
- First: (United States) Graham Rahal (RLL Racing)
- Second: (Brazil) Tony Kanaan (Chip Ganassi Racing)
- Third: (United States) Marco Andretti (Andretti Autosport)

Chronology
Previous	Next
2014	—

The 2015 MAVTV 500 was an IndyCar Series motor race held on June 27, 2015, at the Auto Club Speedway, in Fontana, California. It was the eleventh round of the 2015 IndyCar Series season and the fourteenth and final Indy car race held at the speedway. The race, which was contested over 250 laps, was won by Rahal Letterman Lanigan Racing driver Graham Rahal, his first win since 2008. Tony Kanaan, driving for Chip Ganassi Racing, finished second, and Marco Andretti finished third driving for Andretti Autosport.

Simon Pagenaud was awarded the pole position by posting the fastest average cumulative speed in qualifying. He was immediately passed for the race lead by his Team Penske teammates, Hélio Castroneves and Juan Pablo Montoya, the former of whom dominated the early portions of the race, leading 43 laps. However, Castroneves was taken out just past the midway point of the race due a crash. Due to the aero package for this race, many drivers, such as Sage Karam, Tony Kanaan, Marco Andretti, and Takuma Sato, would contend for the race lead. Will Power soon became the strong contender for the win, leading a race-high 62 laps. However, Power was taken out in a crash with 9 laps to go. Graham Rahal led the final ten laps and held off Kanaan to grab his second IndyCar win. On the final lap, Ryan Briscoe suffered a violent flip, but walked out unhurt.

Six caution flags were issued for 46 laps, and 80 lead changes were recorded, which broke the record for the most lead changes in an IndyCar race. The final result saw Montoya increase his Drivers' Championship lead over teammate Power. Scott Dixon remained in third, and Rahal had passed Castroneves for fourth. Despite Honda's victory, Chevrolet continued enlarging their Manufacturers' Championship lead with five races remaining in the 2015 season.

== Background ==
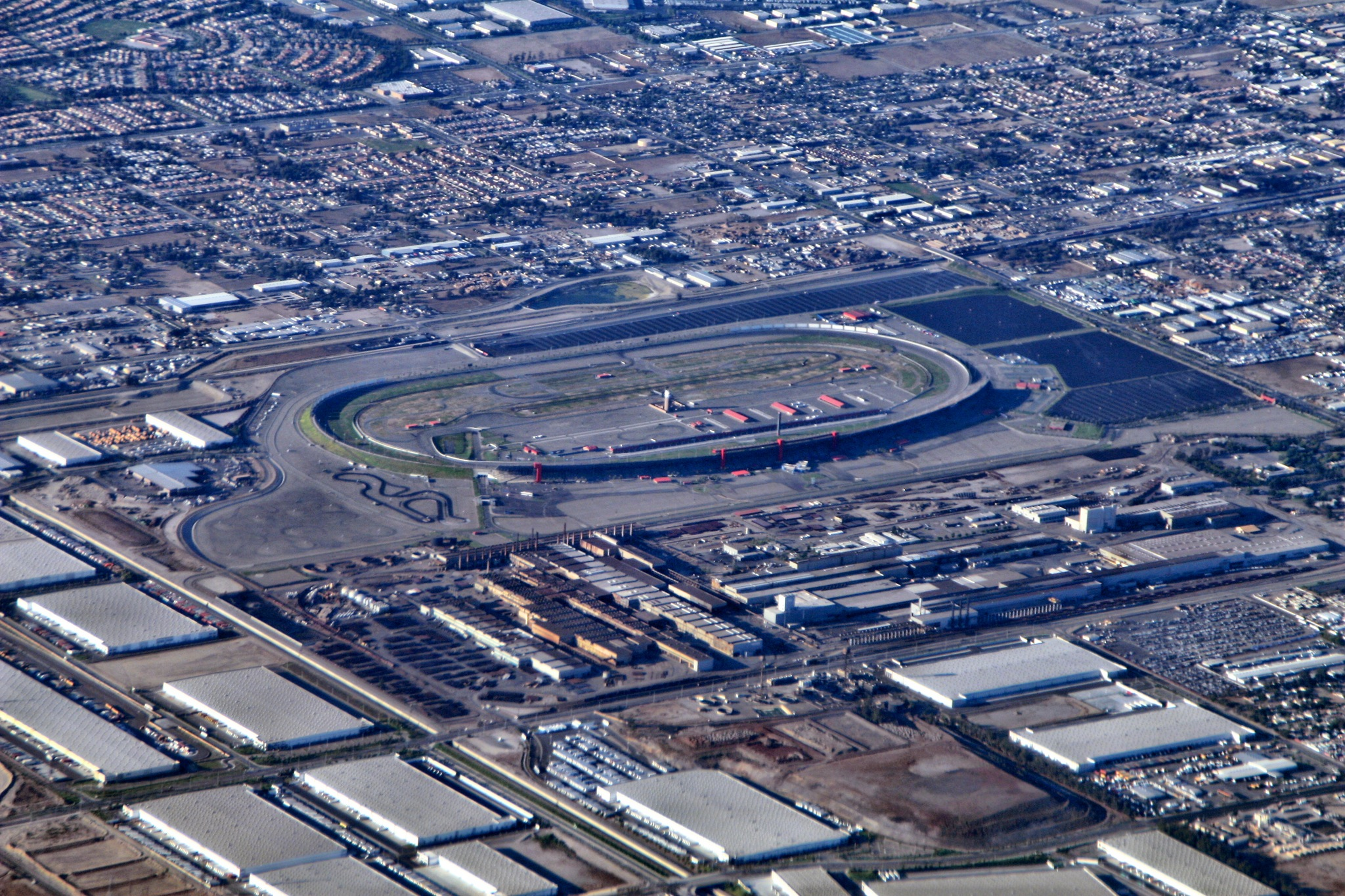
Auto Club Speedway, where the race was held.

The MAVTV 500 was confirmed to be on the 2015 IndyCar schedule in October 2014, alongside the rest of the 2015 schedule. It was the fourth consecutive year the race was held in the series, and the fourteenth overall American open-wheel race at Auto Club Speedway, a 2.000 miles (3.219 km) superspeedway in Fontana, California. However, unlike the past three IndyCar races at Auto Club, this race was not the season finale and was rescheduled to be held on the afternoon of June 27. The event marked the 11th of 16 scheduled races for the 2015 season. Tony Kanaan was the defending race winner.

Entering the event, Team Penske driver Juan Pablo Montoya held the Drivers' Championship points lead with 374 points, 27 ahead of teammate Will Power. Scott Dixon sat third in the standings, 45 points behind Montoya. Hélio Castroneves was fourth with 322 points, while Graham Rahal was fifth with 283 points. Chevrolet was also leading the Manufacturers' Championship with 1003 points. Honda trailed behind in second with 840 points. Montoya, who had won the Indianapolis 500 the month prior, spoke on the possibility of becoming the first driver since Al Unser in 1978 to complete the Triple Crown: "The Triple Crown is not something that I really focus on, but it's something cool that the Verizon IndyCar Series brought back a few years ago and we are proud to be competing for it. Only one team is able to win the Triple Crown this year and it's ours, so that is a cool feeling."

IndyCar implemented a rule surrounding the aero kits that was exclusive to this race. The rear wing mainplane angle was required to be set between 0 and -10.5 degrees, a large difference from the required mainplane angle at Texas earlier that year (-6 to -10.5 degrees). This was done in order to add more downforce to compensate with the higher track temperatures and the forecasted 90 °F (32 °C) climate at the track. Ed Carpenter commented on the rule change: “It’s hard to get your car to work well in all the lanes, but that’s part of the challenge and what I like about the track. In 2012, not many people were running the high groove like I was. The past couple of years people have settled in so you have to get your car to work in other grooves to be able to avoid traffic. It presents you with options if you can figure it out."

== Practice and qualifying ==
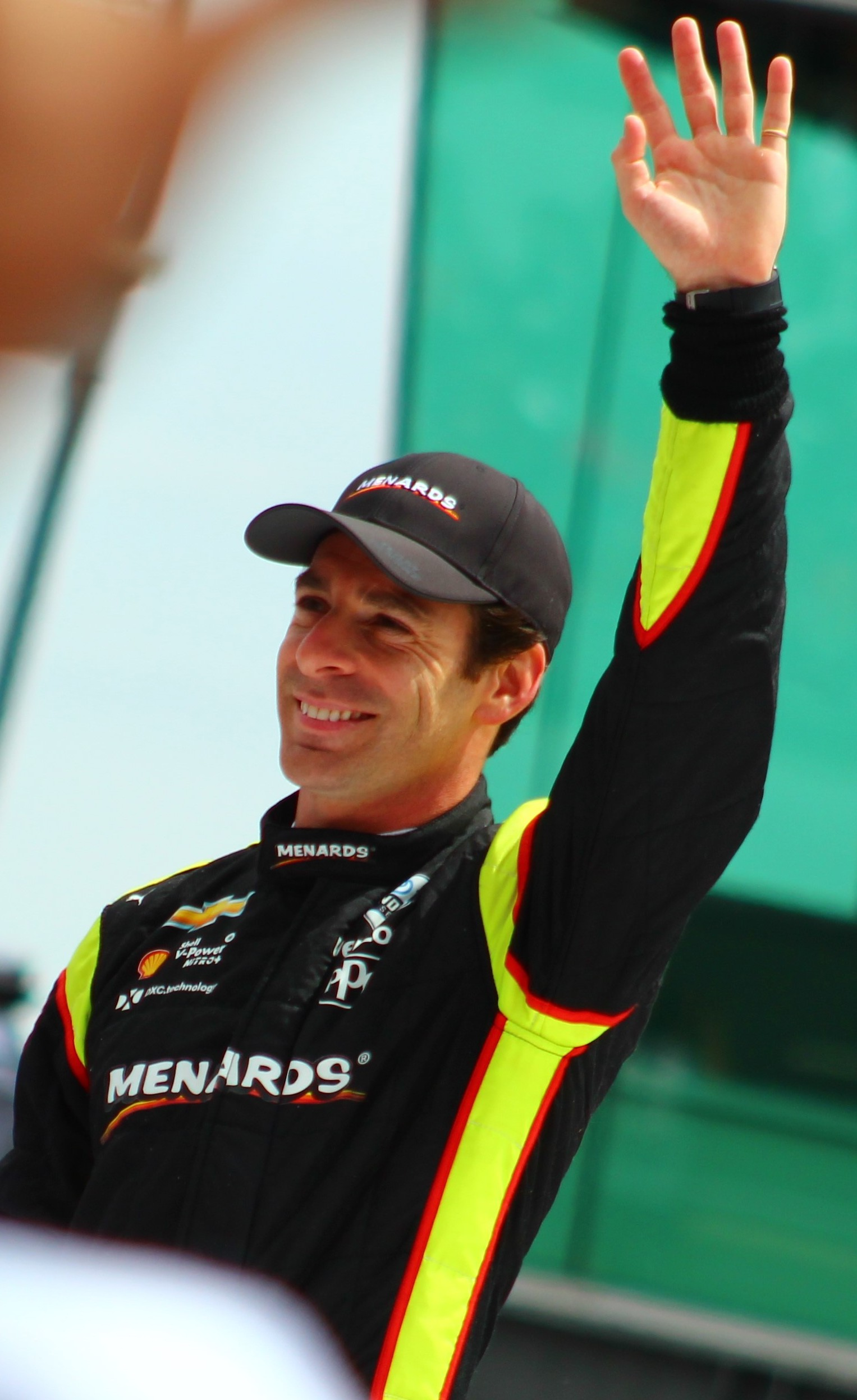
Simon Pagenaud (pictured in 2019) won the second pole position of his Indy car career.

Two practice sessions were held prior to the race on Friday, June 26: the first session was held at 9:30 AM local time and lasted for 45 minutes, while the second session was held at 12:45 PM local time and lasted for 75 minutes. A preliminary practice session was also held at 8:30 AM local time for the rookie drivers. It lasted for 60 minutes, and was led by Gabby Chaves with a speed of 167.933 miles per hour (270.262 km/h). Ryan Briscoe lapped fastest in the first practice session with a time of 33.1109 seconds, ahead of Marco Andretti and Simon Pagenaud. Scott Dixon set the fastest lap of the final practice session with a time of 33.0839 seconds, with Pagenaud and Ed Carpenter in second and third, respectively. During the session, James Jakes suffered an engine issue and stopped on-track, which led to the only caution flag of either practice session. As a result, Jakes was not able to make a qualifying attempt.

The qualifying session was held on Friday, June 26, at 4:45 PM local time. The session permitted each driver to run two laps, and the starting lineup would be determined by the aggregate times and average speed of the two laps. Conditions for the sessions were reportedly very hot, as temperatures exceeded 90 °F (32 °C), though nearby wildfires caused smoke to slightly cover the track. Pagenaud was awarded the pole position, the second of his Indy car career and his first on an oval track, with an overall time of 1:05.7679. His teammate, Hélio Castroneves, joined him on the front row, marking the fifth straight IndyCar race in which a Team Penske entry occupied the front row. Andretti was the fastest Honda entry of the field, qualifying third. Carpenter and Juan Pablo Montoya rounded out the top five, while Tony Kanaan, Dixon, Will Power, Takuma Sato, and Sage Karam took positions six through ten. Kanaan and Dixon's two-lap times were tied (1:06.3033), but Kanaan started one position ahead of Dixon because he qualified before Dixon. Carlos Muñoz, Josef Newgarden, Charlie Kimball, Ryan Hunter-Reay, Sébastien Bourdais, Briscoe, Jack Hawksworth, Chaves, Graham Rahal, and Tristan Vautier nabbed the rest of the top 20 positions. Stefano Coletti, Pippa Mann, and Jakes completed the starting grid.

Following qualifying, Pagenaud said: "Thanks to my crew for the preparations and it's exciting to get a superspeedway pole. Qualifying is one thing. It's a reward for performance. We have a 500-mile race and hopefully I can reward the team for its hard work. It's a brand new team that is gelling really well. This (pole) is nice, but frankly, you can win from the back in a 500-mile race like (Juan Pablo) Montoya did (in the Indianapolis 500). Being able to run in different lanes and being smart in traffic is going to be key." Andretti, who qualified third, said: "We maximized everything in qualifying, and I'm really happy with the race car for the long race. That's the important thing."

Several drivers, including all four Team Penske drivers, held a meeting with IndyCar officials to voice their concerns over the type of racing that the aero package would cause. After qualifying, Montoya expressed apprehension for the aero package: "I don't feel it's the right (aerodynamic) approach to come here to be close to a pack race, to be two (or) three wide in the corners like this, it makes no sense. We're hoping IndyCar does something about it. They're putting themselves in a pretty bad spot." However, IndyCar president Derrick Walker announced no changes would be made to the aero package because the complaints were not consensual among most IndyCar teams and drivers.

=== Qualifying classification ===
Key	Meaning
**R**	Rookie
**W**	Past winner

Pos	No.	Driver	Team	Engine	Lap 1	Lap 2	Total Time	Final grid
1	22	(France) Simon Pagenaud	Team Penske	Chevrolet	32.8599	32.9080	**1:05.7679**	1
2	3	(Brazil) Hélio Castroneves	Team Penske	Chevrolet	32.9164	32.9171	1:05.8335	2
3	27	(United States) Marco Andretti	Andretti Autosport	Honda	33.0378	33.0788	1:06.1166	3
4	20	(United States) Ed Carpenter W	CFH Racing	Chevrolet	32.9883	33.1680	1:06.1563	4
5	2	(Colombia) Juan Pablo Montoya	Team Penske	Chevrolet	33.1160	33.1670	1:06.2830	5
6	10	(Brazil) Tony Kanaan W	Chip Ganassi Racing	Chevrolet	33.1022	33.2011	1:06.3033	6
7	9	(New Zealand) Scott Dixon	Chip Ganassi Racing	Chevrolet	33.1371	33.1662	1:06.3033	7
8	1	(Australia) Will Power W	Team Penske	Chevrolet	33.0502	33.2555	1:06.3057	8
9	14	(Japan) Takuma Sato	A. J. Foyt Racing	Honda	33.0883	33.2378	1:06.3261	9
10	8	(United States) Sage Karam R	Chip Ganassi Racing	Chevrolet	33.1253	33.2159	1:06.3412	10
11	26	(Colombia) Carlos Muñoz	Andretti Autosport	Honda	33.1895	33.2072	1:06.3967	11
12	67	(United States) Josef Newgarden	CFH Racing	Chevrolet	33.3031	33.2128	1:06.5159	12
13	83	(United States) Charlie Kimball	Chip Ganassi Racing	Chevrolet	33.2668	33.3253	1:06.5921	13
14	28	(United States) Ryan Hunter-Reay	Andretti Autosport	Honda	33.3422	33.3296	1:06.6718	14
15	11	(France) Sébastien Bourdais	KVSH Racing	Chevrolet	33.3614	33.3920	1:06.7534	15
16	5	(Australia) Ryan Briscoe	Schmidt Peterson Motorsports	Honda	33.4218	33.3914	1:06.8132	16
17	41	(United Kingdom) Jack Hawksworth	A. J. Foyt Racing	Honda	33.3911	33.4781	1:06.8692	17
18	98	(Colombia) Gabby Chaves R	Bryan Herta Autosport	Honda	33.6946	33.6832	1:07.3778	18
19	15	(United States) Graham Rahal	Rahal Letterman Lanigan Racing	Honda	33.6841	33.7193	1:07.4034	19
20	19	(France) Tristan Vautier	Dale Coyne Racing	Honda	33.7516	33.7536	1:07.5052	20
21	4	(Monaco) Stefano Coletti R	KV Racing Technology	Chevrolet	33.6009	34.1179	1:07.7188	21
22	18	(United Kingdom) Pippa Mann	Dale Coyne Racing	Honda	34.2066	34.1928	1:08.3994	22
23	7	(United Kingdom) James Jakes	Schmidt Peterson Motorsports	Honda	—	—	—	23
Qualifying results

Notes

- **Bold text** indicates fastest time set in session.

== Race ==
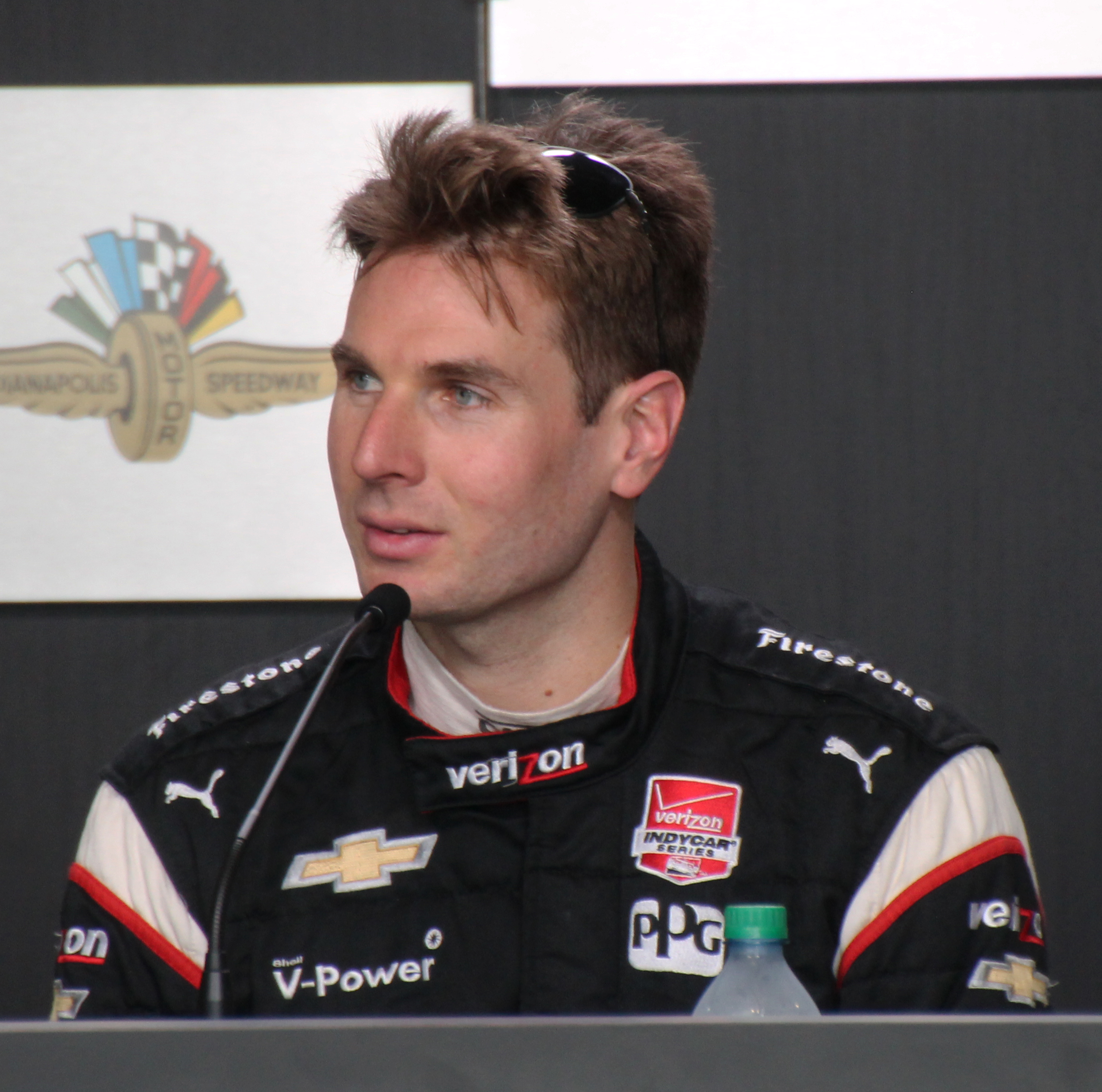
Will Power (pictured in 2015) led 62 laps in the race, more than anyone else, but crashed out late.

The live broadcast of the race began at 1:00 PM local time, and was televised in the United States by NBCSN. Leigh Diffey was the lead announcer, and Steve Matchett and Paul Tracy were the race analysts. Motorsports journalist Dave Despain gave the command for drivers to start their engines. During the pace laps, Gabby Chaves experienced a radio issue and was late to arrive to the grid.

The race began at 1:36 PM local time with a rolling start. Heading into the first turn, pole sitter Simon Pagenaud was quickly passed by Marco Andretti for the race lead. Pagenaud fell to third, and Hélio Castroneves got by Andretti in turn three. Castroneves led the first lap of the race; however, he was soon challenged by Andretti and Juan Pablo Montoya, the former of whom took back the lead in the first two corners. For the next few laps, Castroneves, Montoya, and Andretti traded the race lead several times as Tony Kanaan steadily maintained his position inside the top five. Montoya and Andretti gradually lost positions as Castroneves led laps four through seven. Andretti gained ground on Castroneves and took back the race lead, commanding the field for the next seven laps. On lap 15, Tony Kanaan led his first lap of the race, though he was simultaneously told by IndyCar officials to hold his line. Kanaan also lost the lead to his former teammate Andretti a lap later. Andretti led the next six laps with Kanaan in hot pursuit, and on lap 22, Kanaan finally passed Andretti to lead two more laps. As Kanaan and Andretti battled for the lead, rookie driver Sage Karam suddenly emerged into contention for the race lead and led the first lap of his young IndyCar career on lap 24. From laps 24 through 33, Karam and Kanaan traded the lead four times.

On lap 34, rookie driver Stefano Coletti, who was reportedly dealing with oversteer issues, was the first driver to enter pit road, kicking off the first round of green-flag pit stops. A lap later, Carlos Muñoz and leader Kanaan entered their pit stall, giving up the lead to Andretti. Many of the leaders, including Marco Andretti, wouldn't enter pit road until lap 37. Tristan Vautier, who was part of this large group that pitted on lap 37, struck his front left tire changer, Owen Trower, who was later helped onto a cart and released from the local hospital the night after the race. When the four Team Penske drivers entered pit road a lap later, Will Power's stop was slightly lengthened because he had entered his pit stall at an awkward angle. Castroneves also suffered a setback as he tried exiting his pit stall, as his car stalled for a few seconds before finally going. After the green-flag pit stops had concluded, Andretti raced his way back to the lead, though not before Montoya would lead his first laps of the race from laps 44 to 46. Takuma Sato, who led two laps during the scramble of green-flag pit stops, passed Montoya for the lead on lap 47, and led until Scott Dixon would pass him on lap 52. Sato remained steady to the outside of Dixon and would grab the lead once again on lap 55. He then led for the next 14 laps, the most consecutive laps led by a single driver in this race at this point.

Kanaan gained enough momentum to pass Sato for the lead on lap 71. As this occurred, Castroneves began the second round of green-flag pit stops by pitting along with Sébastien Bourdais. Race leader Kanaan gave up the lead to Sato one lap later as he came in for tires and fuel. After most of the field pitted, three of the Penske drivers and Dixon entered pit road on lap 75. Dixon emerged from pit road before the Penske drivers, but suddenly lost several positions as his car struggled to get up to speed. By lap 76, the field had regrouped, and Penske teammates Power and Castroneves battled intensely, swapping the lead eight times in the next 23 laps as Sato maintained his position within the lead pack. Kanaan raced his way up to the lead once again on lap 99 and battled hard with Power over the next handful of laps. By the 100th lap, 32 lead changes were recorded. On lap 101, Bourdais entered his pit stall, and others would soon follow in the third round of pit cycles. This time, no major incidents were reported, and Power looped around to the race lead by lap 113. Castroneves regained the lead on lap 114, and after Ryan Briscoe led for a single lap, Castroneves would again reclaim the first position and lead the field for the next 18 laps, breaking Sato's record of most consecutive laps led by a driver during this race.

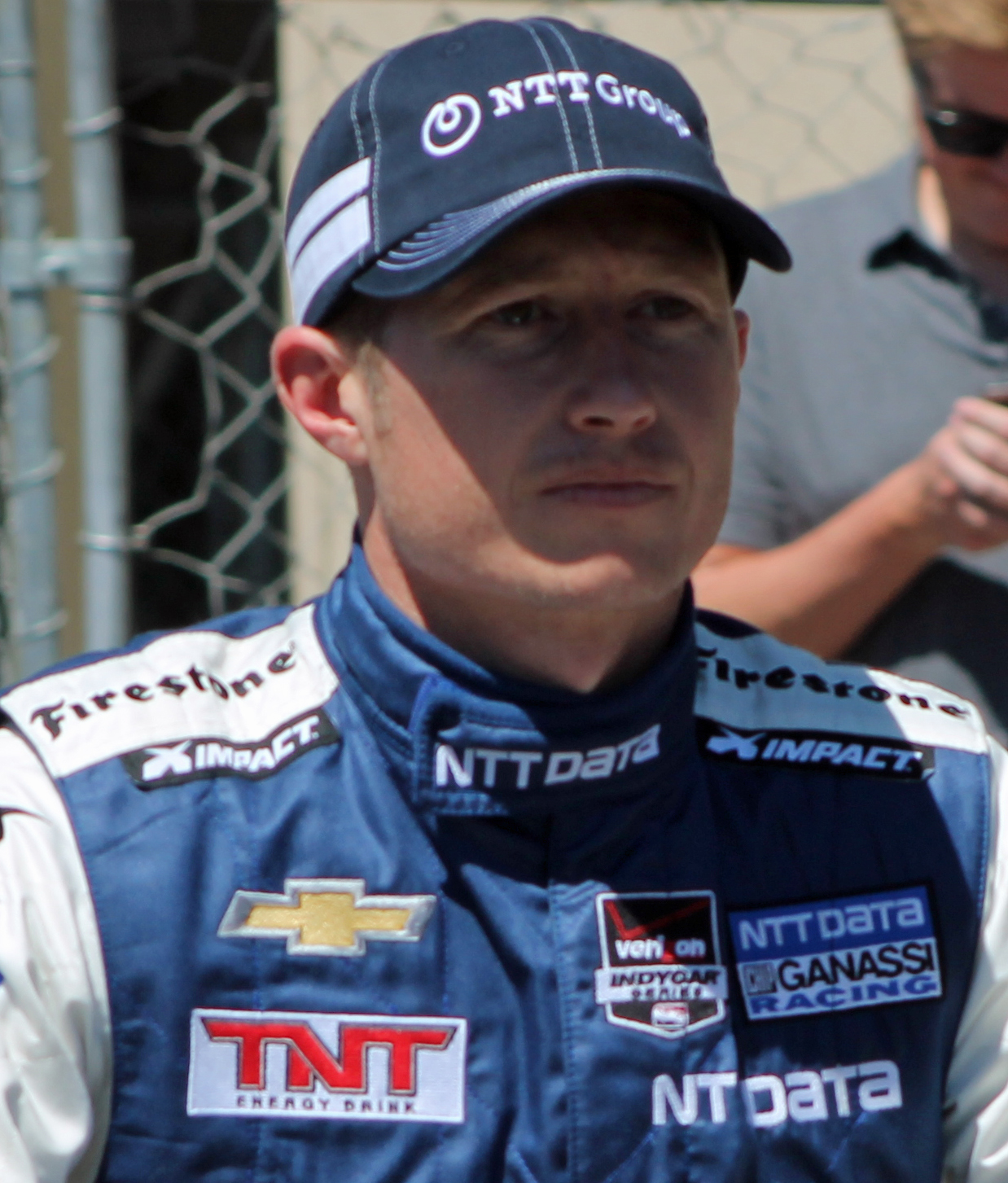
Ryan Briscoe (pictured in 2014) had a terrifying crash on the last lap, but walked out unhurt.

By lap 135, Graham Rahal, a non-factor until this point due to his poor qualifying result, put pressure on Castroneves, racing alongside him for several corners for the lead. Castroneves would finally give up the lead in the second corner on lap 136 and lost a handful of positions in the process as he let off the throttle. on the backstretch, Briscoe swerved up the track while Castroneves concurrently turned down. As a result, Briscoe's right bumper pod made contact with the nose of Castroneves' car, squeezing the latter driver into Power's left-rear tire and sending him spinning into the inside wall. After the first half of the race came and went without incident, the first caution flag was finally shown that same lap. Power escaped without damage, but Briscoe's right bumper pod flew off his car. Castroneves suffered cosmetic damage as a result of his crash and spent several laps in the garage as his team attempted to repair the car. He eventually returned onto the track, several laps down, on lap 151. However, despite his team's best efforts, Castroneves, who had led the most laps of the race thus far, was forced to retire from the race on lap 155 due to cosmetic damage. Under the caution, all of the leaders pitted for tires and fuel. Power exited pit road first, gaining the lead yet again.

When the race was restarted on lap 152, Rahal promptly surged around Power for the lead in turn one, but was surrounded in a four-wide battle for the lead in turn three. Rahal backed off, giving the lead back to Power for lap 153. That same lap, Briscoe was handed a drive-through penalty by the IndyCar officials for his incident with Castroneves, which they deemed avoidable contact. The battle for the lead continued to rage on, with pole sitter Pagenaud leading his first laps of the race from laps 154 to 156. On lap 156, Muñoz made a four-wide pass on the inside in turn three and took the lead from Pagenaud. Two laps later, the second caution flag of the race was issued when Josef Newgarden, who carried a large amount of momentum exiting turn four, was pinched into the outside wall by teammate Ed Carpenter, causing both drivers to crash and retire from the race. The crash broke Carpenter's streak of podium finishes at Auto Club (1st in 2012, 2nd in 2013, 3rd in 2014). Under the caution, leader Muñoz and several others elected to stay out while several drivers entered pit road for a routine stop. Power exited pit road first and fell to tenth.

Upon the restart on lap 168, Andretti attempted to pass teammate Muñoz for the lead, to no avail. On lap 169, Muñoz finally gave up the lead as he was passed down the backstretch by Kanaan and Power. Power led the crowded lead pack on lap 170 and fended them off until lap 172, when Muñoz passed Power and led lap 173 by a slim margin. In turn one of the following lap, Sato made a daring four-wide pass for the lead with Power, Muñoz, and Rahal to his outside. After Sato led lap 174, Power reclaimed the lead the next lap before Sato passed him the lap after. As Power lost a handful of positions, Sato led the next three laps until Kanaan gained the lead in turn three. He then led six of the next seven laps, only being passed by Rahal on lap 183. As Rahal continued challenging Kanaan for the lead, Andretti took advantage of their battle and passed the two drivers on the outermost lane in turn one. On lap 187, Muñoz gave up his track position by pitting, which initiated the fourth green-flag pit cycle. A lap later, Rahal entered pit road without any issues. However, as he drove away from his pit stall, his fueler had reinserted the fuel hose back into the fuel cell, causing part of the hose to rip apart from the fuel rig and detach itself on the backstretch. The caution flag would finally be issued on lap 191, the third of the race. IndyCar officials made the controversial decision to avoid penalizing Rahal, with race control explaining that it was a "human error mistake."

Andretti led the field to the restart on lap 200. In the next eight laps, five drivers (Power, Dixon, Ryan Hunter-Reay, Briscoe and Kanaan) would swap the race lead in an intense battle. Power took the lead yet again on lap 208 and led for the next four laps until Andretti retained the lead on lap 213. From there, the race lead was interchanged numerous times between Andretti and Power for the next 14 laps. On lap 220, Dixon turned left to make a pass on Muñoz on the backstretch. Dixon's front nose caught Muñoz's left bumper pad, causing it to fly off of Muñoz's car; the fourth caution of the day was flown a lap later. All of the leaders entered pit road for what they expected to be the final time. Power, who was second when the caution came out, drove out of pit road first and reclaimed the race lead from Andretti. During the restart on lap 228, Rahal passed Andretti for second position, and eventually snatched the lead from Power by a nose. Heading into the first turn on the next lap, Power, Rahal, Kanaan, and Pagenaud drove four-wide for the lead, though Power had the advantage on the innermost lane and began driving away from the field. As Power completed lap 229, Briscoe nearly collided with Rahal on the frontstretch and was forced onto the apron for a brief moment. Rahal then received a warning from the IndyCar officials for his aggressive blocking. Briscoe would eventually reclaim the lead on lap 236 by utilizing the draft from Power, who was racing side-by-side with Kanaan for the lead. Briscoe defended his position by running on the inside lane, and after Power led lap 237, Briscoe led the next three laps as the battle for the lead continued to intensify. At one point, Sato attempted to go five-wide entering turn three, but he backed off.

On lap 241, Rahal, who had been intently battling with Briscoe throughout the prior few laps, gained some momentum on the outside lane and got by him on the backstretch to take the race lead once again. Meanwhile, in a heated battle for fourth position, Sato was squeezed in between Power and Dixon and ricocheted off both drivers. While Dixon escaped scot-free, Sato's contact with Power sent both drivers spinning hard into the outside wall on the frontstretch. Sato's car lifted off the ground for a moment, but he stayed upright. Neither driver was injured, but Power was evidently furious and threw his steering wheel as safety marshals arrived to the scene. Power eventually walked out, still aggravated, and shoved one of the marshals while he was helping him from the crash scene. Because of the accident, IndyCar officials issued the red flag to clean up the debris on the frontstretch. When the yellow flag was brought back out, the top five drivers in the running order (Rahal, Briscoe, Kanaan, Dixon, and Montoya) stayed out while others, including pole sitter Pagenaud, entered pit road for the final time for fresh tires in an attempt to gain an advantage on the drivers with worn tires.

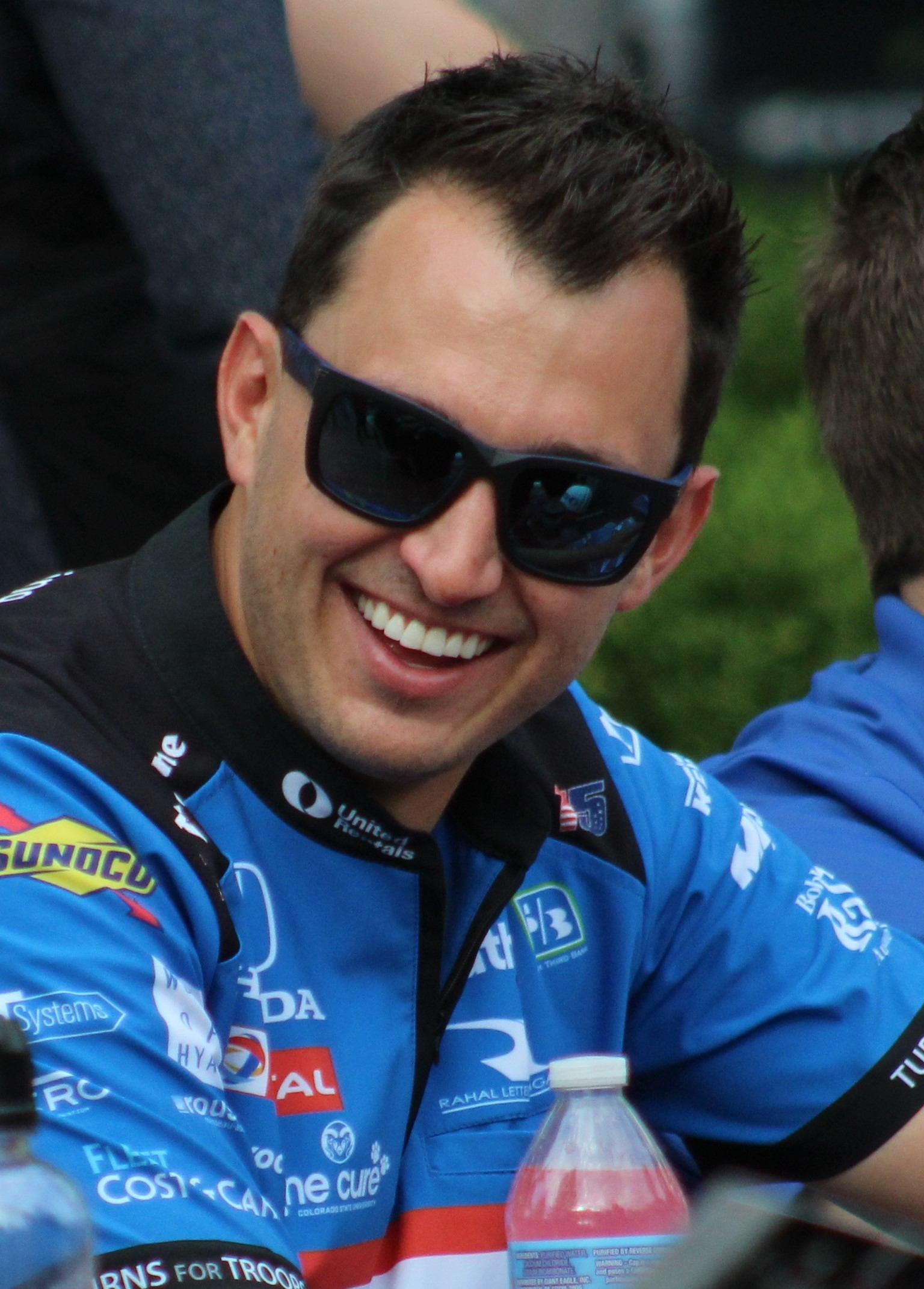
Graham Rahal (pictured in 2018) won the race, his first win in seven years.

The race got going once more on lap 248, with Rahal still leading. Kanaan emerged from the middle lane to take the second position from Briscoe, and raced hard with Rahal for the lead. Rahal led lap 248, but Kanaan would have the slight edge entering turn one to take the lead, though Rahal reclaimed the lead exiting turn two. Andretti gained a burst of speed from Rahal's draft and dove to the apron to try to pass Rahal on the backstretch, only to get blocked by him. Rahal used the inside lane to his advantage, similar to what Power had done prior to his wreck, and cleared Kanaan for the lead entering the frontstretch. As the white flag was waved to signify the final lap of the race, drivers became more desperate than ever to obtain a draft and steal the win. Hunter-Reay, who was running sixth entering the final lap, was pinched by Montoya and Karam. Hunter-Reay then pinballed off Karam, who was running to his outside, and spun down the track, collecting Briscoe. Hunter-Reay and Briscoe continued spinning in the grass, with Hunter-Reay's car getting slightly airborne as he spun around several times. However, Briscoe, who spun at a sideways angle in excess of 210 miles per hour (340 km/h), caught lots of air underneath his car, causing it to flip upside-down. When Briscoe crashed back down, his nose dug into the grass and he violently pirouetted in the air several times before flipping back upright and coming to a stop just past the start-finish line. Despite the savagery of the wreck, Briscoe and Hunter-Reay were able to walk out of their destroyed cars, unharmed.

Because of the crash, the caution flag was flown for the sixth and final time, with Rahal leading ahead of Kanaan by half a car-length at the moment of caution. Rahal was awarded the victory, with Kanaan in second, Andretti third, Montoya fourth, and Karam fifth. Dixon, James Jakes, Charlie Kimball, Pagenaud, and Jack Hawksworth rounded out the top ten. Muñoz, Coletti, Pippa Mann, Bourdais, Vautier, and Chaves were the last of the classified finishers. Eighty lead changes were recorded amongst fourteen different drivers throughout the duration of the race, which broke a record for the most lead changes in a single American open-wheel race in history. (Note: The record was previously held by the 2001 Marlboro 500 at Auto Club Speedway which had 73 lead changes.) Despite Power's disappointing finish, he earned two bonus points for leading a race-high 62 laps. Rahal's win in this race marked his second career victory, and his first win since the 2008 Honda Grand Prix of St. Petersburg, 124 races ago. This was the longest streak between wins by an Indy car driver. It was also the first win for Honda in IndyCar since the 2014 Iowa race.

=== Post-race ===
Rahal drove to victory lane to celebrate the win with his crew and earned $100,417 in race winnings. He spoke on the pleasure of breaking his winless streak: "I feel like this year we have been knocking on the door a lot. We’ve been so close and I feel like we deserved it before but hadn’t gotten it yet so to get this one feels unbelievable. Our weakness has been these ovals and I told the guys this morning that the next three races will define our year."

Rahal also talked about his incident on pit road, which nearly cost him a shot at the win: "We were definitely lucky with that one. Unlucky but lucky because I went out of pit lane, and I was like, the frigging thing won't shift. I mean, I couldn't figure out what it was. And then I looked in the mirror, and I was, like, you've got to be kidding me, not again. And then luckily it wasn't in all the way, so when I kind of moved the car back and forth, it finally popped out." The following Wednesday, IndyCar issued a $10,000 fine to the #15 Rahal Letterman Lanigan Racing team for leaving pit road with equipment attached. The fueler was also placed on probation for the next three races.

Public reception of the race was divided amongst fans and drivers; some were in support of the close-quarters pack racing, while others were opposed to it. Jan Wagner of the Del Mar Times commended the race, saying it was "one of the best IndyCar races ever." Carpenter was among the people who defended the racing style, posting on Twitter: "I love close IndyCar racing. Hate to see drivers bad-mouthing a series. If you want to race, race. If not, retire." A. J. Foyt, who owns Sato's car, felt that it was great racing because drivers were actually able to race. Despite his flip on the last lap, Briscoe also praised the racing style on his Twitter account: "I thought today's IndyCar race was awesome. A few drivers need to show more respect out there, but the racing was fierce and exciting." The day after the race, Schmidt Peterson Motorsports posted a humorous video to Twitter, in which Briscoe visited the site of the crash and laid on it. Rahal regarded the race as "the most exciting race we had in years" due to the drivers' ability to drive on different lanes:

"I don't think it was purely pack racing. What made this good today was there's four different lanes to run. It's not that there's too much downforce and whatever... And I thought today the tires went off just enough to make it intriguing, make it interesting at the end... That's the sort of thing that today brought out, whereas the old pack racing wasn't... the tires were good, you know, you were stuck all the time. Today, there was variation in line and that's what made it good."

However, critics of the race likened the style of racing to the 2011 Las Vegas race, which was cancelled and abandoned after a 15-car pileup claimed the life of Dan Wheldon. Power, who was fined $25,000 and placed on probation for the remainder of the season for pushing the safety marshal, slammed the pack racing during his post-race interview and indirectly referenced Wheldon's death: "What are we doing? What are we doing? We went in there and told them it would be pack racing. And that was a Vegas situation right there." He continued his rant: "As exciting as it is, it's insane. You can't get away. You can't get away and you have to take massive risks to gain track position. It's crazy racing. It's crazy, crazy, crazy. We just don't need another incident like we had at Vegas. And running like this, it will happen. It's just a matter of time."

Tim Cindric, Team Penske's race strategist, echoed Power's sentiments: "It’s really disappointing because we all sat down with IndyCar after Las Vegas and discussed the fact we could never have another race like we had there, in terms of the pack racing that goes on or used to go on in IndyCar. Why we’re here doing that today, I have no idea. Fortunately, these guys are okay." Kanaan and Montoya, who both finished inside the top five, aired their grievances about the pack racing in their interviews. Kanaan said: "It’s a new package, We keep guessing. We guessed on the wrong side. It was great for the fans, but people are not in the race car to see what 215 mph is like doing this. I would like you guys to try, the guys that criticize us. It’s tough and stressful. Hopefully we come up with a better solution." Montoya said: "Honestly, I felt it was a little too stupid. I talked to IndyCar yesterday and we shouldn’t be racing like this." Kanaan also felt that he was ahead of Rahal at the moment of caution, but he congratulated Rahal on the win. IndyCar CEO Mark Miles admitted the following Wednesday that series officials had gone too far with the aero package, but disapproved of the drivers' criticisms, which he claimed was "damaging" to the sport's image.

Another major criticism surrounding this race was its rescheduling from its usual fall date to a new afternoon summer date. Less than 10,000 people watched the race in person, with some estimates even suggesting that the attendance was below 5,000. Kanaan pointed out the low attendance rate in his post-race interview: "If there were 100,000 fans we might want to race that way. To do this in front of 5,000 people is stupid. At Texas, there were no problems, but it was criticized for being a boring race. How can we make everyone happy?" Veteran motorsports journalist Robin Miller acclaimed the race, calling it "one of the five best races I've ever seen"; however, he then gave several harsh criticisms to Miles' scheduling of the race and the 2015 season, saying: "It was disgraceful today to see 3,000 people to watch one of the greatest IndyCar races of all time." He also said: "Mark Miles doesn’t listen to anybody who knows anything about racing. He’s got his own agenda."

Dave Miller, president of Auto Club Speedway, also disliked the rescheduling of the race, and stated: "We’re not going to do that to our fans any more. It needs to be either September, October or later in the year, after Labor Day. If it’s another summer date, it’s not going to work, to be frank." Two months after the race, IndyCar announced that Auto Club would not return to the series in 2016, citing disagreements with Miller surrounding the start time of the race. In 2018, Miller would reaffirm that the track was open to bringing back IndyCar racing, should the right circumstances arise. However, in 2020, NASCAR sold the Auto Club Speedway property and began the process of remodeling the superspeedway to a half-mile short track. In October 2023, the track was closed for demolition.

The final running order left Montoya with a total of 407 points, extending his Drivers' Championship lead to 46 points over Power. Dixon maintained the third position, 49 points back, while Rahal's victory and Castroneves' early crash led to Rahal gaining the fourth position in the points standings over Castroneves. Despite the win for Honda, Chevrolet continued expanding their lead in the Manufacturers' Championship by earning a total of 1108 points, 187 more than Honda had earned at this point in the season.

=== Race classification ===
Pos	No.	Driver	Team	Engine	Laps	Time/Retired	Pit Stops	Grid	Laps Led	Pts.
1	15	(United States) Graham Rahal	Rahal Letterman Lanigan Racing	Honda	250	2:57:40.6179	9	19	15	51
2	10	(Brazil) Tony Kanaan W	Chip Ganassi Racing	Chevrolet	250	+0.3157	8	6	23	41
3	27	(United States) Marco Andretti	Andretti Autosport	Honda	250	+1.2490	9	3	31	36
4	2	(Colombia) Juan Pablo Montoya	Team Penske	Chevrolet	250	+2.1182	8	5	5	33
5	8	(United States) Sage Karam R	Chip Ganassi Racing	Chevrolet	250	+2.9539	10	10	5	31
6	9	(New Zealand) Scott Dixon	Chip Ganassi Racing	Chevrolet	250	+3.6092	9	7	7	29
7	7	(United Kingdom) James Jakes	Schmidt Peterson Motorsports	Honda	250	+4.9846	9	23		26
8	83	(United States) Charlie Kimball	Chip Ganassi Racing	Chevrolet	250	+5.3595	10	13		24
9	22	(France) Simon Pagenaud	Team Penske	Chevrolet	250	+7.4054	10	1	3	24
10	41	(United Kingdom) Jack Hawksworth	A. J. Foyt Enterprises	Honda	250	+9.5128	10	17		20
11	26	(Colombia) Carlos Muñoz	Andretti Autosport	Honda	250	+11.6907	10	11	14	20
12	4	(Monaco) Stefano Coletti R	KV Racing Technology	Chevrolet	250	+11.9206	10	21		18
13	18	(United Kingdom) Pippa Mann	Dale Coyne Racing	Honda	250	+24.3450	10	22		17
14	11	(France) Sébastien Bourdais	KV Racing Technology	Chevrolet	250	+25.1511	12	15		16
15	28	(United States) Ryan Hunter-Reay	Andretti Autosport	Honda	249	Accident	10	14	3	16
16	5	(Australia) Ryan Briscoe	Schmidt Peterson Motorsports	Honda	249	Accident	11	16	7	15
17	19	(France) Tristan Vautier	Dale Coyne Racing	Honda	246	+4 Laps	9	20		13
18	14	(Japan) Takuma Sato	A. J. Foyt Enterprises	Honda	241	Accident	7	9	31	13
19	1	(Australia) Will Power W	Team Penske	Chevrolet	241	Accident	7	8	62	14
20	98	(Colombia) Gabby Chaves R	Bryan Herta Autosport	Honda	237	+13 Laps	10	18		10
21	67	(United States) Josef Newgarden	CFH Racing	Chevrolet	161	Accident	5	12		9
22	20	(United States) Ed Carpenter W	CFH Racing	Chevrolet	157	Accident	4	4	1	9
23	3	(Brazil) Hélio Castroneves	Team Penske	Chevrolet	136	Accident	4	2	43	8
Race results

== Broadcasting ==
In the United States, the race was televised by NBCSN. Leigh Diffey called the race on television with Steve Matchett and Paul Tracy providing analysis. Pit reporters were Jon Beekhuis, Kevin Lee, and Robin Miller. The race averaged 512,000 viewers, becoming the most-watched IndyCar race on NBCSN since September 2011. The broadcast earned a 0.37 TV rating. During the COVID-19 pandemic of 2020, NBCSN reaired the race on April 6, 2020.

A 90-minute broadcast of the qualifying session was aired on NBCSN at midnight on June 27.

Indianapolis Motor Speedway Radio Network provided coverage of the event on radio. Paul Page headed the IMS booth with analyst Davey Hamilton, with Mark Jaynes and Jake Query reporting from the track.

== Championship standings after the race ==
Drivers' Championship standings

	Pos.	Driver	Points
	1	(Colombia) Juan Pablo Montoya	407
	2	(Australia) Will Power	361 (–46)
	3	(New Zealand) Scott Dixon	358 (–49)
1	4	(United States) Graham Rahal	334 (–73)
1	5	(Brazil) Hélio Castroneves	330 (–77)

Engine manufacturer standings

Pos.	Manufacturer	Points
1	Chevrolet	1108
2	Honda	921 (–187)

- Note: Only the top five positions are included.

== Notes and references ==
=== References ===
Previous race: 2015 Honda Indy Toronto	IndyCar Series; 2015 season	Next race: 2015 ABC Supply Wisconsin 250
Previous race: 2014 MAVTV 500 IndyCar World Championships	MAVTV 500	Next race: —
