= Ma's Roadhouse =

American reality television series

- Genre: Documentary; Reality television
- Starring: Rick Fairless; Ma (Sharon Fairless)
- Country of origin: United States
- Original language: English
- No. of seasons: 1

Production
- Production locations: Dallas, Texas
- Running time: 30 min. (with commercials)

Original release
- Network: TruTV
- Release: September 15 – October 27, 2010

Related
- Full Throttle Saloon

Ma's Roadhouse is an American reality television series that aired on the truTV network. The series provides an inside look at the Strokers Dallas biker bar located in Texas. Rick Fairless is the owner of Strokers Dallas, a Texas motorcycle shop, tattoo parlor and biker bar. His greatest asset is his 71-year-old mother, who's also his best, but most outspoken, employee.

== Production and broadcast history ==
Ma's Roadhouse premiered on truTV on September 15, 2010. The show had 7 episodes during its first season. The last episode of the first season was aired on October 27, 2010.

== Cast ==
- Rick Fairless, Owner
- Sharon "Ma" Fairless (Manager/Cook)
- Lena (Parts Department)
- Sue (Office Manager)
- Meghan (Marketing & PR Manager)
- Debbie ("Resident Babe")
- Nick Jones ("Staff Calendar Photographer")
