= Totally NASCAR =

- Genre: News program
- Based on: NASCAR
- Starring: Steve Byrnes; Kirsten Gum
- Country of origin: United States
- Original language: English

Production
- Camera setup: Multi-camera
- Production company: Fox Sports

Original release
- Network: Fox Sports Net (2001–2004; 2010–2013)
- Release: 2001 – 2004; 2010 – 2013

Related
- Inside NASCAR; NASCAR Nation; NASCAR Race Hub NASCAR RaceDay NASCAR Victory Lane

Totally NASCAR was a newscast about NASCAR racing that aired on Fox Sports Net. The program returned in 2010 after a 6-year absence, but in a different format from the show that was originally shown from 2001 to 2004.

== Original version ==
The original show aired nightly and replaced the recently cancelled weekly show Inside NASCAR that had aired on TNN until late 2000 when NASCAR began a new television contract.

The show debuted on February 12, 2001, six days before NASCAR on Fox was unveiled at the Daytona 500. The program's first host was Steve Byrnes and its first field reporter was Kirsten Gum, who also hosted each week when Byrnes was at the track for Fox. In 2002, Gum left for OLN (later Versus) and was replaced by Krista Voda, who became primary host of the show by 2004. John Roberts, host of FSN and Speed Channel's weekend programming, also served as host from time-to-time.

The program was a mix of news, highlights, features, and interviews. There were regular weekly appearances by NASCAR on Fox analysts Larry McReynolds and Jeff Hammond, and weekly weather reports provided by Fox News Channel.

The show's original producer was Ryan McGee. McGee greenlit the addition of NASCAR.com's Marty Smith as a "garage insider." Years later they became cohosts of Marty & McGee at ESPN.

=== Controversy ===
When Totally NASCAR was launched, NASCAR allowed it access to race highlights. At the same time, RPM 2Night, an established show on ESPN2, was denied them. This was done by classifying Totally as a news program, and RPM as a magazine show. In response, ESPN did not allow Totally NASCAR to use footage from any race carried by ESPN or ABC prior to 2001 or footage from NASCAR Craftsman Truck Series events, which were carried on ESPN2.

The footage battles, which many believed showed de facto favoritism to FSN, led to a large number of complaints, both from viewers and television critics. Some fans blame the policy for the eventual end of RPM 2Night in 2002, but no one ever substantially proved this. Ironically, the two shows were produced only a few miles apart in south Charlotte, NC and a large chunk of the original Totally NASCAR production staff was made up of former RPM staffers. (In contrast, RPM2Night's successor, NASCAR Now, is based at ESPN headquarters in Bristol, Connecticut.)

== Current version ==
Totally NASCAR was a weekly program. It was fed to FSN affiliates on Mondays, but actual air dates and times vary from region to region. The host was Jill Arrington, in her first regular network assignment in several years (she had married a Hollywood agent and become a mother). The program largely consists of segments re-aired from NASCAR RaceHub, which is a four-day-a-week show on Speed, which is also owned by Fox Cable Networks.

=== Move to Speed Channel ===
In 2005, FSN relinquished the show rights to Speed (then called SPEED Channel). Speed chose not to bring the show back after the November 21, 2004, episode and set up a successor program, NASCAR Nation, on Speed Channel. The second run of the show ended when Speed was closed down.

== Air times ==
Totally NASCAR aired at 6 p.m. local time Monday through Friday from 2001 to 2003 and re-aired at 6:30 pm ET on Speed Channel. By 2002 it was the highest rated studio show on both FSN and Speed. In 2004, the time was changed to 5:30 p.m., then to 7:30 p.m. about halfway through the season. The time shift made the original feed unavailable in most of the country, due to scheduled live play-by-play coverage that aired on FSN affiliates and ratings suffered.

== Notable events ==
- The show was nominated for a 2002 Sports Emmy for Outstanding Daily Studio Show, losing to ESPN's Baseball Tonight, despite a staff of less than 20 and a production office that was essentially a double wide trailer in an office parking lot.
- Hammond's first demo car was sponsored by America's Most Wanted and featured the photos of missing children on its hood. In at least one instance, information called in by a Totally NASCAR viewer helped to solve the mystery of a missing girl.
- When Krista Voda became full-time host in 2004, she is believed to be the first full-time female host of a national sports program.
