= Krista Voda =

American sportscaster

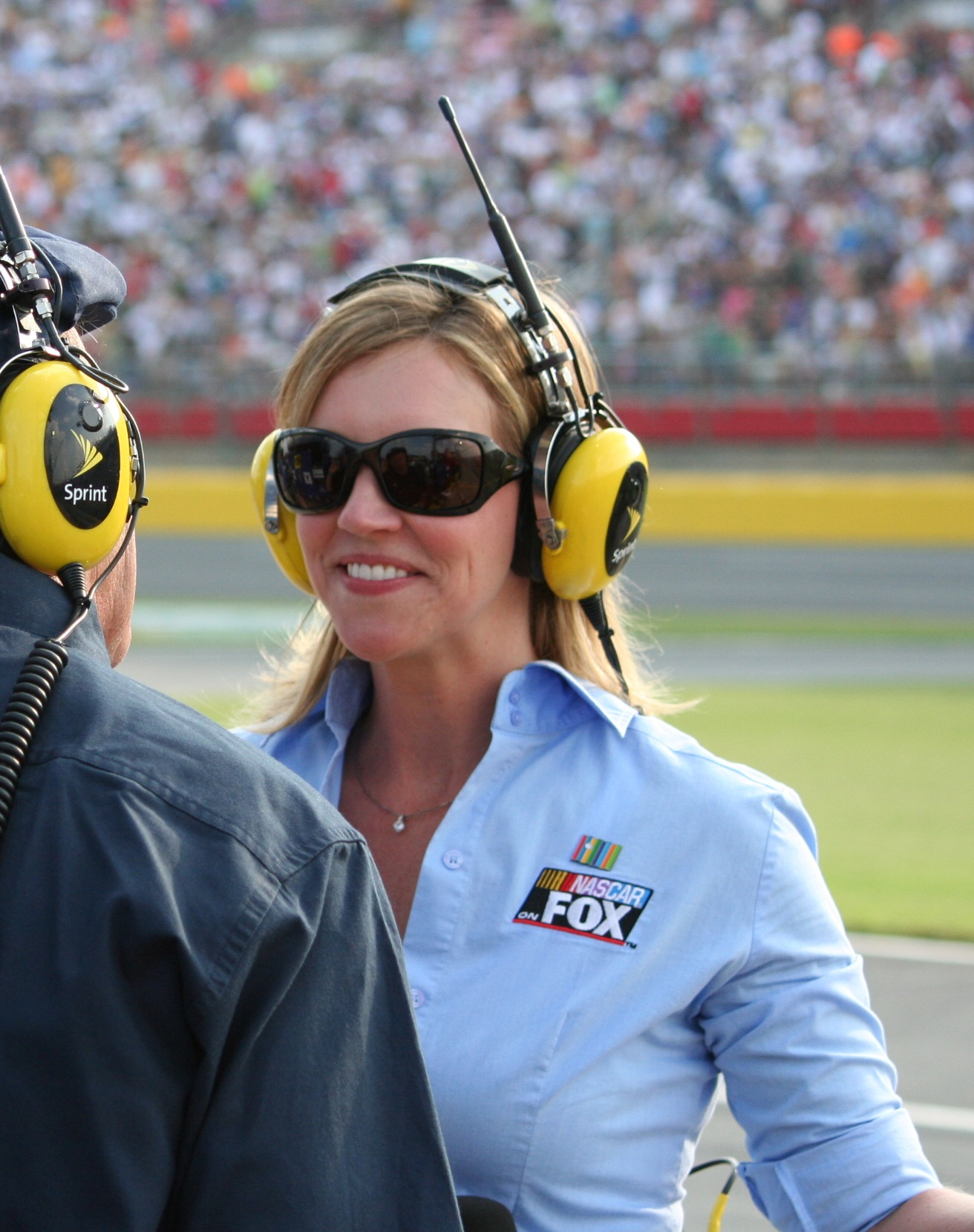
- Voda at the 2011 Coca-Cola 600 at Charlotte
- Born: May 31, 1974 (age 52); Clinton, Iowa, U.S.
- Other name: Krista Kelley
- Education: University of Northern Iowa
- Occupations: TV announcer, sports reporter
- Years active: 2003–present
- Known for: NASCAR on NBC host
- Spouse: Phillip Kelley (m. 2010)

Krista Voda Kelley (born May 31, 1974) is an American sportscaster who covers auto racing as the play-by-play announcer for the ARCA Menards Series on MAVTV. She previously worked for NASCAR on Fox and NASCAR on Speed from 2003 to 2014 as the host of the pre-race show for the Truck Series and beginning in 2007 as a pit reporter for the NASCAR Cup Series. She also was a fill-in sideline reporter for Fox's NFL coverage. She then worked as the pre and post-race show host for the Cup Series for NBC from 2015 to 2020.

== Career ==
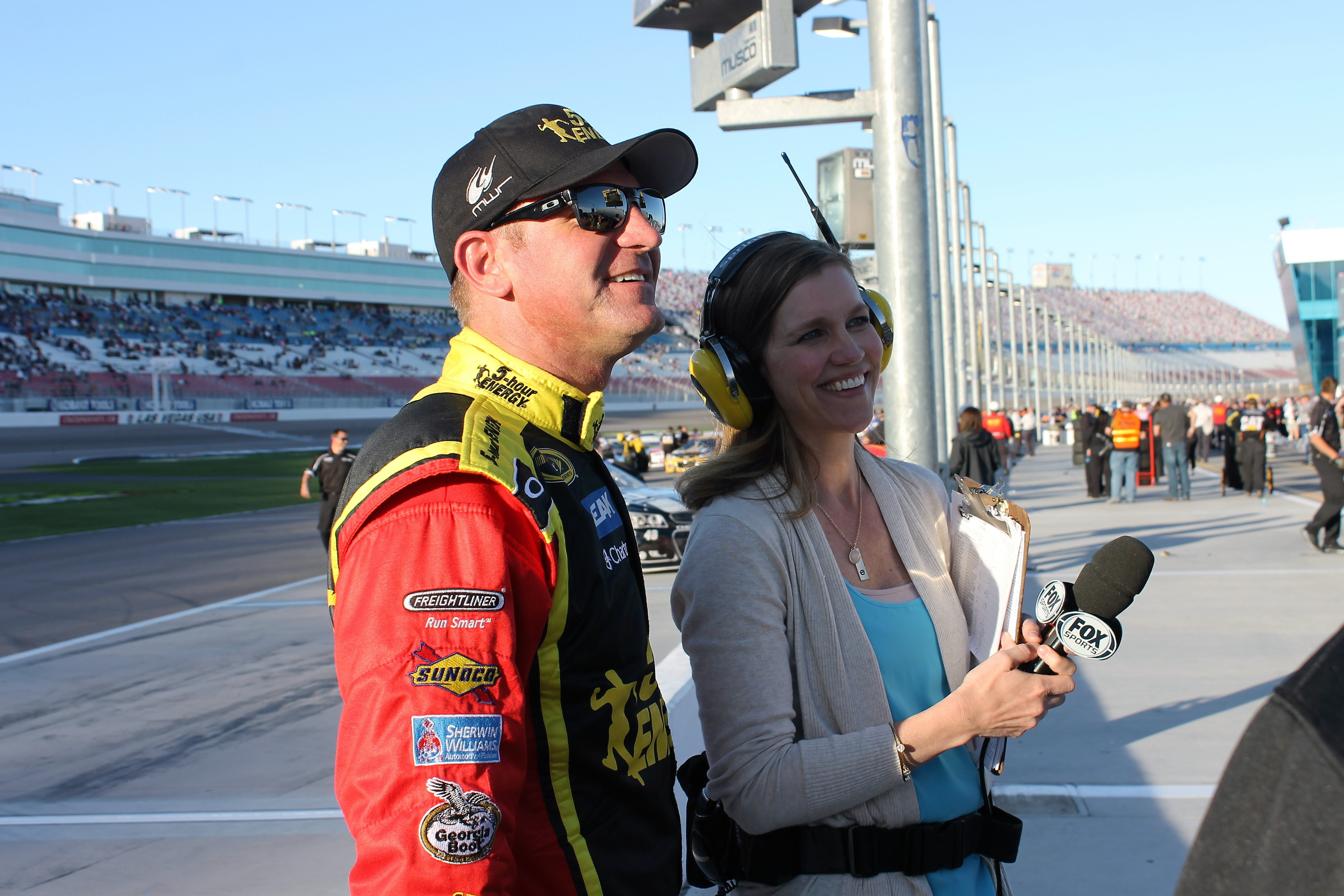
Voda interviews Clint Bowyer at Las Vegas Motor Speedway in 2014

Voda was born and raised in Clinton, Iowa and attended the University of Northern Iowa. In high school, she lettered in volleyball, basketball, and track and field. Her surname means water in Slavic languages.

Voda began as a NASCAR broadcaster in 2003 as co-anchor of Totally NASCAR on Fox Sports Net. She was also co-host on NASCAR Nation when that show aired on Speed Channel. Before moving to FSN, she worked for various local television stations in Iowa and Kentucky, including WLEX, the NBC affiliate in Lexington. Among her first radio jobs was working the night shift at KROS AM/FM in her hometown of Clinton, Iowa. She hosted The Setup, the pre-race show for coverage of the Camping World Truck Series, as well as Trackside on Fox Sports 1 (formerly Speed Channel). In 2007, she was promoted to NASCAR on Fox as a pit reporter for the NASCAR Cup Series, replacing Jeanne Zelasko, who moved to Fox's baseball coverage full-time.

In addition to NASCAR, she has covered college football (including the Cotton Bowl Classic), the NCAA Men's Division I Basketball Championship, the Kentucky Derby, the World Series, the PGA Championship, and the National Football League.

On October 29, 2014, Voda was announced to be the pre- and post-race host for NBC Sports' NASCAR coverage, which includes hosting NASCAR America on NBCSN.

On November 7, 2020. Voda announced on her Facebook page that she would not be returning to NBC to host pre and post-race programs for NASCAR races once the 2020 season ends in mid-November 2020. NBC eliminated her position due to COVID-19 financial problems and the network could not find another role for her.

In 2021, Voda joined MAVTV as the host of their Lucas Oil On the Edge show. In 2022, she returned to calling races as the play-by-play for MAVTV's ARCA Menards Series races, replacing Bob Dillner, who was promoted to a managerial/supervisory-type role with the network. She became the second woman to be a play-by-play in motorsports after Jamie Little, who became the play-by-play for the ARCA races on Fox in 2021.

== Personal life ==
Voda lives in Pittsburgh, Pennsylvania and married Phillip "PK" Kelley on January 23, 2010.

When it was announced that she would be the play-by-play for the ARCA Menards Series on MAVTV, the press release referred to her as Krista Kelley (her married name). Her social media accounts are still "Krista Voda". Neither Krista herself nor MAVTV have yet to further specify which last name she will be using on-air during the season.
