= My Classic Car =

- Created by: Brad Kimmel
- Starring: Dennis Gage
- Country of origin: United States
- No. of seasons: 24
- No. of episodes: 520

Production
- Running time: 30 minutes

Original release
- Network: TNN, Spike, Speed Channel, Velocity and now Discovery Turbo.
- Release: 1997

My Classic Car is a television show about classic automobiles, hosted by Dennis Gage. It was originally broadcast on TNN, and Speed Channel, followed by MAVtv and Velocity. As of 2026, the show airs on the Discovery Turbo network. It was produced by MadStache, who also created Popular Hot Rodding Television, Corbin’s Ride On and Texas Hardtails.

The host of the show, Dennis Gage, is known for his seemingly boundless enthusiasm, his trademark handlebar moustache and the catchphrase with which he ends every episode, "Honor the timeless classics."

The series features major classic automobile shows and collections, usually in the United States but occasionally in other countries, including Canada and the United Kingdom. Some episodes focus on celebrities and prolific car collectors such as talk show host Jay Leno. Every episode also features a segment now sponsored by Autogeek Garage, a source for auto detailing supplies, car wax, car care products, car polishes, auto accessories, polishers, and car detailing tools.
