= ESPN's Bottom 10 =

Humorous list on ESPN

ESPN publishes the "Bottom 10" worst college football teams weekly during the regular season.

The Bottom 10 (officially, ESPN.com's Bottom 10) is a week-by-week regular season "ranking" of the worst ten college football teams in the NCAA Division I FBS. ESPN.com writer Ryan McGee currently writes the column each week and is the sole determiner of the teams that are listed.

One of the running gags of the Bottom 10 is the "highly coveted Number 5 spot." This spot is typically reserved for "the top FBS blunder of the week" – a normally strong football team that found itself on the wrong end of an upset the prior week; an example would be the Bottom 10 of September 7, 2011, which featured Oregon State at the #5 ranking after its upset loss to Sacramento State, a Division I FCS program that had previously never beaten an FBS team in its history. Occasionally, the Number 5 spot can be used for other aspects relating to the game, as occurred on two consecutive weeks in 2015. On October 13, "Monday" (that day) was Number 5 following three significant events: the firing of Steve Sarkisian as head coach at USC, the PED suspension of Florida starting quarterback Will Grier, and the unexpected retirement of South Carolina head coach Steve Spurrier. One week later, the Number 5 spot was handed to "Digital Tough Guys from Michigan", referring to a number of putative Michigan fans who sent insulting tweets and death threats to Wolverines punter Blake O'Neill after his mishandling of a snap led to the game-winning touchdown for Michigan State in their October 18 game.

The Bottom 10 uses alternate names to connote failure of the bottom 10 teams (ie UMess for UMass, UTEPid for UTEP).

The Bottom 10 also features the "Pillow Fight of the Week", which is usually a matchup between fellow Bottom 10 teams.

== The Bottom 10 in popular culture ==
The Bottom 10 rankings are occasionally referenced by other sportswriters when writing editorials about teams that the writers consider to be poor performers. One example of this can be found in the Stanford Review: "Stanford has consistently maintained the #2 spot on the ESPN "Bottom 10" rankings, only losing, or winning depending on your perspective, to equally hapless Duke."

== Original idea ==
The Chicago Tribune credits the idea to Los Angeles sportswriter Steve Harvey approximately 30 years before ESPN began using the term. On Sept 6, 1972, the Los Angeles Times introduced the Bottom 10 as follows: "This season The Times will keep football fans up to date on the bad as well as the good in football with (Steve) Harvey's irreverent feature, The Bottom 10." ESPN now publishes the rankings "With apologies to Steve Harvey." In 2008, Harvey resumed his "Bottom 10" columns for college and NFL football in the Los Angeles Times. Harvey died on November 10, 2026 at the age of 80, some time after McGee published that week's Bottom 10. He paid tribute to Harvey in the following week's rankings.

== See also ==
- Futility Bowl
