= Ryan McGee =

American sportswriter

Ryan McGee is a senior writer for ESPN The Magazine and formerly a television producer with ESPN, Fox Sports Net, and NASCAR Media Group. He covers a variety of American sports, but is best known for his motorsports work, particularly NASCAR, and college football. Before joining ESPN The Magazine he was a columnist for FoxSports.com. He was also editor-in-chief at NASCAR Media and wrote the script for the documentary Dale, that was narrated by Paul Newman.

In 2006 he published his first book, ESPN Ultimate NASCAR: 100 Defining Moments in Stock Car Racing History and his second, The Road To Omaha: Hits, Hopes, and History at the College World Series which was published in May 2009. The paperback version was published in May 2010. In 2018, he co-authored the Dale Earnhardt Jr. book and New York Times bestseller Racing to the Finish. In 2020 he co-authored Sidelines and Bloodlines with father Dr. Jerry McGee and brother Sam McGee about Dr. McGee's longtime career as a college football official.

McGee was also an analyst/contributor to ESPN2's night studio show NASCAR Now before the show was canceled in early 2014. He is currently a commentator on ESPNU and the SEC Network, where he frequently guest hosts on The Paul Finebaum Show.

McGee co-hosts Marty & McGee alongside Marty Smith. In 2015 the podcast was promoted to a regular weekend time slot on ESPN Radio and in 2018 a TV version of the show began on the SEC Network.

McGee also writes a column for ESPN.com called the Bottom 10, where he ranks and explains the ten worst teams in College Football. The column is updated weekly.

== See also ==
- Totally NASCAR
