= Formula 1 Debrief =

American television series

- Starring: Bob Varsha (Speed Channel host); David Hobbs; Steve Matchett
- Country of origin: United States

Production
- Running time: 30 minutes

Original release
- Network: Speed Channel
- Release: April 4, 2009 – December 1, 2012

Formula 1 Debrief was a show on the American channel Speed (TV channel). It started airing on April 4, 2009, and ended on December 1, 2012. The "roundtable" show included Speed's 3 former F1 broadcasters covered the previous Formula 1 race, showed highlights and commenting on them. The three personalities were Bob Varsha, Steve Matchett, and David Hobbs with clips of Will Buxton, Speed's only broadcaster presented at F1 races.

== Schedule ==
Each race's review show usually aired on the weekend of the next Grand Prix race; e.g., the review of the Korean race aired on the weekend of the Brazilian race, not on the 'off' weekend between the races.
