= Automobile Competition Committee for the United States =

Umbrella organization of auto racing sanctioning bodies in the United States

- Abbreviation: ACCUS-FIA
- Formation: 1957
- Type: Sports federation
- Purpose: Motorsports
- Location: Daytona Beach, Florida
- Region served: United States
- Members: 6
- Official language: English
- Affiliations: FIA; IndyCar; IMSA; NASCAR; NHRA; SCCA; USAC
- Website: accusfia.us

The Automobile Competition Committee for the United States (ACCUS) is an umbrella organization of auto racing sanctioning bodies in the United States. It is the official liaison of U.S. sanctioning bodies to the Fédération Internationale de l'Automobile (FIA). It was founded in 1957 to take over FIA representation when the American Automobile Association withdrew from racing and dissolved the AAA Contest Board. ACCUS processes international competition licenses for drivers in the U.S. and provides homologation and record keeping. ACCUS is also responsible for the inspection process and the issuance of FIA Historic Technical Passports (HTP) for competitors wishing to take part in International Historic events sanctioned by FIA worldwide.

== Member clubs ==
The member clubs are:

- INDYCAR, LLC (IndyCar; 1997–present)
- International Motor Sports Association, LLC (IMSA; 1973–present)
- National Association for Stock Car Auto Racing (NASCAR; 1957–present)
- National Hot Rod Association (NHRA; 1965–present)
- Sports Car Club of America (SCCA; 1957–present)
- United States Auto Club (USAC; 1957–present)

== Former member clubs ==
- Championship Auto Racing Teams/Champ Car World Series (CART/Champ Car, 1988–2008)
- Grand American Road Racing Association (Grand-Am)
