= Kirsten Gum =

- Born: December 8, 1972 (age 53); Alaska, United States
- Occupations: TV host; sportscaster; raw food chef
- Website: http://www.kirstengum.com

Kirsten Gum (born December 8, 1972), is an adventure traveler, sports commentator, and raw food chef. She was also the host of the reality television series Cash & Treasures and Treasure Hunter: Kirsten Gum on the Travel Channel.

== Early life and education ==
Kirsten was born in Alaska but raised on an apple orchard in Okanogan, Washington, and attended the University of Washington, where she graduated from the Broadcast Journalism and Political Science schools.

== Career ==
=== Television ===
After working as one-woman broadcast team in Jefferson City, Missouri, Gum landed her first on-air jobs as a news reporter and sportscaster in Chattanooga, Tennessee, and Fox 18 WCCB in Charlotte, North Carolina, where she was a news anchor and was voted "Sexiest Woman in Charlotte." She then went on to host the following television shows over a period that lasted nearly two decades: Fox Sports Net's Totally NASCAR, ESPN’s Outdoor Block, Outdoor Living Network’s Tour de France studio show (where she was the first-ever female host for the event), Travel Channel's Treasure Hunter: Kirsten Gum, and Discovery HD Theater's What's My Car Worth? At one time, Gum was considered the most recognizable woman in sports commenting.

=== Raw Food Chef ===
Gum currently works as a raw food chef, having received her certification from Living Light Raw Foods Culinary Institute in Fort Bragg, California. She has taught raw food instruction at the Japan Living Beauty Association, where she also sits on the board of directors.

== Personal life ==
In addition to covering sports, Gum has led an active life, coming in as part of the second-place team in Virginia's 400-mile adventure race the "Beast of the East" in October 2005. She went on to compete in Primal Quest, an expedition-length adventure race that has been called one of the most difficult athletic events in the world and was cited as the most prestigious expedition event in North America. Gum is also an avid environmentalist.
