= IndyCar =

Auto racing sanctioning body for North American open wheel racing

IndyCar, LLC
- Sport: Auto Racing
- Category: Open-wheel cars
- Jurisdiction: United States; Canada
- Founded: 1996 (as Indy Racing League)
- Affiliation: ACCUS-FIA
- Affiliation date: 1997
- Owner(s): Penske Entertainment (67%); Fox Corporation (33%)
- Headquarters: Indianapolis, Indiana, U.S.
- President: Doug Boles
- CEO: Mark Miles

Official website
- indycar.com

IndyCar, LLC (stylized as INDYCAR), is an auto racing sanctioning body for American open-wheel car racing headquartered in Indianapolis, Indiana. The organization sanctions two racing series: the premier IndyCar Series with the Indianapolis 500 as its centerpiece, and the developmental series Indy NXT. IndyCar is recognized as a member organization of the FIA through the Automobile Competition Committee for the United States.

The sanctioning body was formed in 1994 under the name Indy Racing League by Hulman & Company, which also owned the Indianapolis Motor Speedway complex, and began competition in 1996. The trademark name INDYCAR was officially adopted on January 1, 2011. The sport of open-wheel car racing, also historically referred to as championship car racing or Indy car racing, traces its roots in the US to as early as 1905. It is the fourth major sanctioning body to govern the sport of Indy car racing, following the American Automobile Association's Contest Board, the United States Auto Club (USAC), and Championship Auto Racing Teams (CART), and operated alongside the Champ Car World Series before acquiring the latter.

Today, IndyCar is owned by the Penske Entertainment Corp., a subsidiary of Penske Corporation. Penske purchased IndyCar and the Indianapolis Motor Speedway from Hulman & Co. in November 2019. In July 2025, Fox Corporation purchased a one-third stake in Penske Entertainment Corp for around $125–135 million.

== History ==
=== IndyCar name ===
The term "Indycar" began as a nickname for the cars that competed in USAC's Championship Division of open-wheel racing in the United States, deriving from the sport's most popular competition, the Indianapolis 500. The division's link with Indianapolis soon resulted in the term surpassing the official term "championship car" (or its short form "champ car") in common use and promotions.

The term continued to be used by USAC's replacement as the dominant governing body for open-wheel racing, CART, which called its main series the "CART PPG Indy Car World Series" despite the body not sanctioning the 500. In 1992, during an attempt by CART to broaden their board membership, the Indianapolis Motor Speedway registered the camel case trademark IndyCar with the United States Patent and Trademark Office and licensed it to CART as their new trade name.

In 1996, Indianapolis Motor Speedway President Tony George launched a new national championship racing series, the Indy Racing League. This resulted in a legal battle over the IndyCar trademark: In March 1996, CART filed a lawsuit against the Indianapolis Motor Speedway in an effort to protect their license to the IndyCar mark after the Indianapolis Motor Speedway had attempted to terminate it. In April, the Indianapolis Motor Speedway filed a separate lawsuit against CART to prevent them from further use of the mark.

Eventually a settlement was reached in which CART agreed to give up the use of the IndyCar mark following the 1996 season and the IRL agreed not to use the name before the end of the 2002 season. CART returned to branding as simply CART for 1997, and resurrected the term "champ car" to describe their vehicles.

Following a six-year hiatus, the Indy Racing League announced it would rename their premier series the IndyCar Series for the 2003 racing season. CART, beset by team departures and other financial issues, filed for bankruptcy that year; a trio of former CART team owners were selected by the bankruptcy court to purchase CART's assets, which they used to reorganize as the Champ Car World Series. The two series were unified for the 2008 season, with the unified series using the IndyCar Series name.

Post-unification, a heavy emphasis has been placed on deemphasizing the IRL name and replacing it with "IndyCar". This became official on January 1, 2011, as Indy Racing League LLC adopted as its trade name INDYCAR. On November 1, 2013, the company's legal name was changed to INDYCAR LLC.

=== Split with CART ===
The dispute between CART and IRL centered on the Indianapolis 500, long considered the flagship race of the sport. From 1980 until 1995, USAC continued to sanction the Indy 500, although CART drivers predominantly competed in the race and points that drivers scored during the event counted towards the CART drivers' championship. George felt that his opinions regarding increasing costs and revenue sharing were being ignored, while CART team owners felt George used his influence over USAC to have a disproportionate impact on the general operation of the sport.

After a number of attempts at a compromise board failed, IMS formed the Indy Racing League in 1994, with the series being slated to begin racing in 1996. CART had primarily sanctioned Indy car racing since 1979, when the organization broke away from USAC. George blueprinted the IRL as a lower-cost open-wheel alternative to CART, which in his view had become technology-driven and dominated by a few wealthy multi-car teams. The IRL was designed only to run on oval tracks, in order to promote American drivers from the midget and sprint car ranks to graduate to IndyCar racing, the same way that IndyCar legends A.J. Foyt, Mario Andretti, Johnny Rutherford, and the Unsers (Al Unser, Sr. and Bobby Unser) had in the 1960s.

Starting with the first IRL season, the league proclaimed that 25 of the 33 spots in the Indy 500 starting grid would be reserved for cars from full-time IRL teams. In 1996, CART retaliated by scheduling what was supposed to become its new showcase event, the U.S. 500, at Michigan International Speedway on Memorial Day, the traditional date for the Indy 500.

The new 1997 technical rules featured less expensive chassis and "production-based" engines that were purchased rather than leased, but most importantly, were technically incompatible with CART specifications. The IRL's early seasons consisted of sparse schedules and inexperienced teams, with the degradation in quality especially apparent during the Indianapolis 500, which saw a dramatic decline in prestige.

The IRL began to draw top teams from CART starting in 2002, contributing to the latter's bankruptcy, replacement by the Champ Car World Series in 2003, and ultimate demise and absorption by the IRL in 2008.

=== Unification with Champ Car ===
On January 23, 2008, Tony George offered Champ Car management a proposal that included free cars and engine leases to Champ Car teams willing to run the entire 2008 IndyCar Series schedule in exchange for adding Champ Car's dates at Long Beach, Toronto, Edmonton, and Australia to the IndyCar Series schedule, effectively reuniting American open-wheel car racing. The offer was initially made in November 2007. On February 10, 2008, Tony George, along with IRL representatives Terry Angstadt and Brian Barnhart, plus former Honda executive Robert Clarke, traveled to Japan to discuss moving the Indy Japan 300 at Twin Ring Motegi. Moving that race, or postponing it, would be required in order to accommodate the Long Beach Grand Prix, which was scheduled for the same weekend. Optimism following the meeting was high.

In February 2008, Indy Racing League founder and CEO Tony George and owners of the Champ Car World Series completed an agreement to unify the sport for 2008. The result was that the Champ Car World Series was suspended except for the Long Beach Grand Prix. Many of the former Champ Car teams moved to the IndyCar Series using equipment provided by the IRL.

Randy Bernard was announced as the new IRL CEO in February 2010. In 2011, the sanctioning body dropped the Indy Racing League name, becoming IndyCar to reflect the merged series. The new Dallara DW12 race car was introduced for the 2012 season. IndyCar collaborated with DreamWorks Animation to launch comedy film Turbo in 2013. Bernard was fired in October 2012, and replaced by Mark Miles.

After absorbing Champ Car, the IndyCar Series became what the CART series from which it separated was and its related European open-wheel formula counterparts: former prominent CART teams such as Chip Ganassi Racing and Team Penske are frequent race winners, there is a strong contingent of foreign-born drivers, the cars are increasingly electronic and aero dependent. The schedule currently includes more road and street courses than oval tracks. The IndyCar Series recently introduced hybrid powertrains.

=== Driver safety ===
Driver safety has also been a major point of concern, with a number of drivers seriously injured, particularly in the early years of the series. There have been five fatal crashes in the history of the series. Compared to road racing venues, the lack of run-offs on oval tracks, coupled with higher speeds due to the long straights and banked turns, means that there is far less margin for error. Car design was attributed as a leading cause of early injuries, and the series made improvements to chassis design to address those safety concerns. Following a series of spectacular high-profile accidents in 2003, including American racing legend Mario Andretti and former champion Kenny Bräck, as well as the death of Tony Renna in testing at Indianapolis, the IRL made additional changes to reduce speeds and increase safety.

IndyCar was the first racing series to adopt the SAFER soft wall safety system, which debuted at the Indianapolis 500 and has now been installed at almost all major oval racing circuits. The SAFER system research and design was supported and funded in large part by the Hulman-George family and the Indianapolis Motor Speedway.

== Fatalities ==
Notable fatalities:

- (United States) Scott Brayton – (May 17, 1996), 1996 Indianapolis 500 practice session.
- (United States) Tony Renna – (October 22, 2003), Firestone private testing session.
- (United States) Paul Dana – (March 26, 2006), 2006 Toyota Indy 300 practice session.
- (United Kingdom) Dan Wheldon – (October 16, 2011), 2011 IZOD IndyCar World Championship.
- (United Kingdom) Justin Wilson – (August 24, 2015), 2015 ABC Supply 500.

== See also ==
- Indianapolis Motor Speedway
- Indianapolis Motor Speedway Radio Network
- United States Auto Club
- CART
- Champ Car World Series
- List of IndyCar Series teams
- List of IndyCar Series racetracks
