= NASCAR Classics =

- Starring: Matt Yocum (2002–2004)
- Country of origin: United States

Production
- Running time: 2 hours (including commercials, was also 2 hours from 2002–2004)

Original release
- Network: Speed Channel; NBCSN
- Release: 2002 – 2004; 2009 – 2012; 2014 – present

NASCAR Classics is a series of NASCAR races that aired on Speed Channel. It aired from 2002 to 2004 and returned in 2009 before quietly disappearing off Speed Channel again in 2012. It returned again in 2014 on NBCSN. Matt Yocum was the host of the series before originally ending in 2004.

The program, when it started mainly showed races from CBS that spans from 1979 to 2000. One of the races that they have shown were the Daytona 500 races from 1979 all the way to 2000. Also, they showed races from Talladega Superspeedway from the summer. The last race that was shown was the 2000 Pepsi 400 in 2004. In the spring of 2009, the series returned after a five-year hiatus and started off with the 2006 Food City 500 at Bristol where Kurt Busch earned his first win with car owner Roger Penske and remembered when Jeff Gordon pushed Matt Kenseth after being spun out late in the race. Several months later, Gordon took out Kenseth at Chicagoland Speedway, which was shown later in 2009. Since its return, they have shown recent runnings of the weekend's race (such as 2008 Sharpie 500 shown during the 2009 Sharpie 500 weekend), which expands from 2003 to 2008's event. Speed now shows races from Fox, TNT, ESPN, ABC and NBC. On February 15, 2010, it featured the first non-cup race ever on NASCAR Classics which witness the first race of the NASCAR Camping World Truck Series season at Daytona. The series is currently airing on NBCSN.

== List of races in 2009 ==
- 2006 Food City 500 won by Kurt Busch (Fox)
- 2003 Advance Auto Parts 500 won by Jeff Gordon (Fox)
- 2004 Samsung/Radio Shack 500 won by Elliott Sadler (Fox)
- 2007 Subway Fresh Fit 500 won by Jeff Gordon (Fox)
- 2007 Aaron's 499 won by Jeff Gordon (Fox)
- 2006 Crown Royal 400 won by Dale Earnhardt Jr. (FX)
- 2005 Dodge Charger 500 won by Greg Biffle (Fox)
- NASCAR Sprint All-Star Race XXIV (2008) won by Kasey Kahne (Speed)
- 2005 Coca-Cola 600 won by Jimmie Johnson (Fox)
- 2005 MBNA RacePoints 400 won by Greg Biffle (FX)
- 2006 Pocono 500 won by Denny Hamlin (Fox)
- 2007 Citizens Bank 400 won by Carl Edwards (TNT)
- 2007 Toyota/Save Mart 350 won by Juan Pablo Montoya (TNT)
- 2007 Pepsi 400 won by Jamie McMurray (TNT)
- 2006 USG Sheetrock 400 won by Jeff Gordon (TNT)
- 2005 Allstate 400 won by Tony Stewart (NBC)
- 2008 Pennsylvania 500 won by Carl Edwards (ESPN)
- 2006 AMD at the Glen won by Kevin Harvick (NBC)
- 2007 3M Performance 400 won by Kurt Busch (ESPN2)
- 2008 Sharpie 500 won by Carl Edwards (ESPN)
- 2004 Bass Pro Shops 500 won by Jimmie Johnson (NBC)
- 2008 Chevy Rock & Roll 400 won by Jimmie Johnson (ESPN)
- 2005 Sylvania 300 won by Ryan Newman (TNT)
- 2006 Dover 400 won by Jeff Burton (TNT)
- 2005 Banquet 400 won by Mark Martin (NBC)
- 2005 Sony HD 500 won by Kyle Busch (NBC)
- 2007 UAW-GM Quality 500 won by Jeff Gordon (ABC)
- 2007 Subway 500 won by Jimmie Johnson (ABC)
- 2008 AMP Energy 500 won by Tony Stewart (ABC)
- 2005 Dickies 500 won by Carl Edwards (NBC)
- 2004 Checker Auto Parts 500 won by Dale Earnhardt Jr. (NBC)
- 2005 Ford 400 won by Greg Biffle and Tony Stewart won championship (NBC)

== Daytona 500 and other races ==
During the original series, Speed showed all of the Daytona 500 races on CBS. They also showed other races from that CBS broadcast including Talladega Superspeedway's July/October race (CBS aired it from 1979–97) and the July race at Daytona (CBS showed it in 1999 and 2000). Florida's Fox Sports Net channel Sun Sports has shown NASCAR Classics during the five-year hiatus. Also, ESPN Classic has shown races as well, mostly from ESPN family of networks, with an exception on February which shows the Daytona 500. Before 2002, Speed showed other NASCAR races (originally broadcast by Mizlou) back when it was known as Speedvision; the races shown before that time are in bold.

- 1979 Daytona 500
- 1980 Daytona 500
- 1981 Daytona 500
- 1982 Daytona 500
- **1982 Mountain Dew 500**
- 1983 Daytona 500
- 1984 Daytona 500
- 1984 Talladega 500
- 1985 Daytona 500
- **1985 Budweiser 500**
- 1986 Daytona 500
- 1987 Daytona 500
- 1988 Daytona 500
- 1989 Daytona 500
- 1990 Daytona 500
- 1991 Daytona 500
- 1992 Daytona 500
- 1993 Daytona 500
- 1994 Daytona 500
- 1995 Daytona 500
- 1996 Daytona 500
- 1997 Daytona 500
- 1997 Miller 400
- 1998 Daytona 500
- 1999 Daytona 500
- 1999 Pepsi 400
- 2000 Daytona 500
- 2000 Pepsi 400
- 2010 NextEra Energy Resources 250 won by Timothy Peters (Speed)

== Races from 2010 to 2012 ==
- 2005 Sony HD 500 won by Kyle Busch (NBC)
- 2006 UAW-DaimlerChrysler 400 won by Jimmie Johnson (Fox)
- 2005 Golden Corral 500 won by Carl Edwards (Fox)
- 2008 Food City 500 won by Jeff Burton (Fox)
- 2009 Goody's Cool Orange 500 won by Jimmie Johnson (Fox)
- 2010 Goody's Fast Pain Relief 500 won by Denny Hamlin (Fox)
- 2009 Subway Fresh Fit 500 won by Mark Martin (Fox)
- 2006 Checker Auto Parts 500 won by Kevin Harvick (NBC)
- 2009 Samsung 500 won by Jeff Gordon (Fox)
- 2009 Aaron's 499 won by Brad Keselowski (Fox)
- 2005 MBNA NASCAR RacePoints 400 won by Jimmie Johnson (TNT)
- 2007 NEXTEL All-Star Challenge won by Kevin Harvick (Speed)
- 2005 Food City 500 won by Kevin Harvick (Fox)

== Races aired on NBCSN ==
- 2001 Pepsi 400 won by Dale Earnhardt Jr. (NBC)
- 2002 Brickyard 400 won by Bill Elliott (NBC)
- 2003 Ford 400 won by Bobby Labonte (NBC)
- 2004 Daytona 500 won by Dale Earnhardt Jr. (NBC)
- 2004 Brickyard 400 won by Jeff Gordon (NBC)
- 2004 Ford 400 won by Greg Biffle and Kurt Busch won the championship (NBC)
- 2005 Allstate 400 at the Brickyard won by Tony Stewart (NBC)
- 2005 Subway 500 won by Jeff Gordon (NBC)
- 2011 Ford 400 won by Tony Stewart who also won the championship via tiebreaker over Carl Edwards (ESPN)
