= Local time =

Time measured in a specific place

Local time is the time observed in a specific locality. There is no canonical definition. Originally it was mean solar time, but since the introduction of time zones it is generally the time as determined by the time zone in effect, with daylight saving time where and when applicable. In some places this is known as standard time.

Some sources continue to use the term local time to mean solar time as opposed to standard time, but they are in the minority. Terms such as local mean time also relate to solar time.

== See also ==
- Local mean time
  - Apparent solar time
- Local time (mathematics)
- Local time in the Lorentz ether theory
- Standard time
- UTC
- GMT
