= Rick Fairless =

American businessman

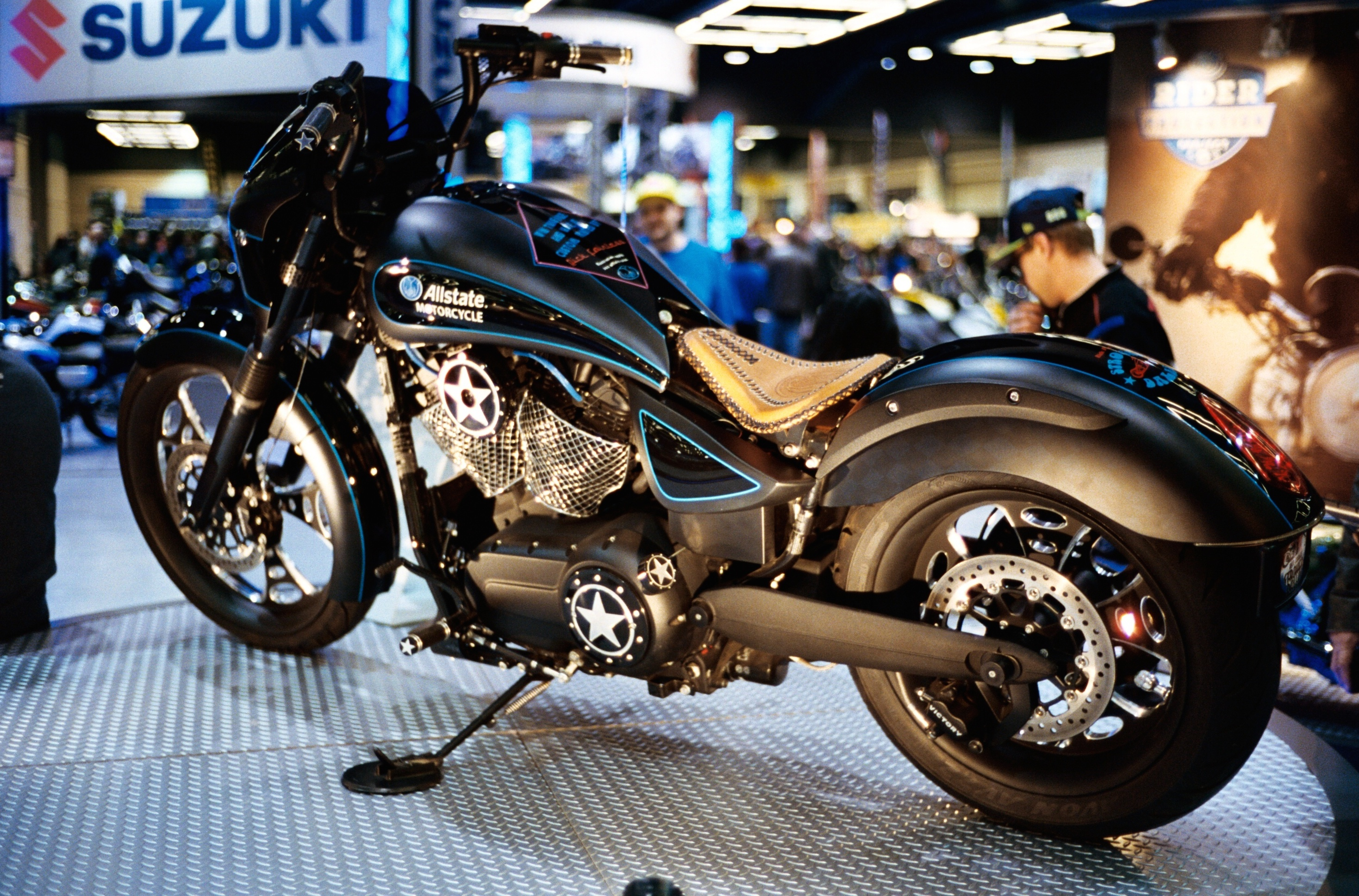
Victory motorcycle customized by Fairless

Rick Fairless is a maker of custom choppers. His business, Strokers Dallas, sells custom choppers in Dallas, Texas.

== Life ==
Rick Fairless has a regular radio show on KRLD-FM in Dallas/Fort Worth: The Texas Hardtails Scooter Show. He now produces the show from his shop and video podcasts can be seen at his website.

Fairless has appeared on Discovery Channel's Biker Build-Off and SPEED Network's Texas Hardtails. Examples of his custom and theme choppers are shown in the book Choppers: Heavy Metal Art. In 2008, the William J. Clinton Presidential Center exhibited bikes by custom builders, and two Fairless choppers, Coors and Bettie, were included.
