= American Muscle Car =

Production
- Running time: 30 minutes

Original release
- Network: Speed Channel
- Release: 2003

American Muscle Car is a weekly television show on Speed, produced by Restoration Productions LLC., about muscle cars. Original release was in 2003. Each episode provides a timeline of each vehicle's history beginning with its first year of production to its most recent year of production. The show was initially designed to showcase traditional muscle cars such as the Chevrolet Camaro, Ford Mustang, and Dodge Charger. It eventually added other performance vehicles such as the Shelby Cobra and the, and even began to focus on specific eras such as the (disambiguation)|. In 2006 season, the show's focus was expanded to include designers and engineers of muscle car era.

In 2007 season, the show's focus was expanded to include vintage races, powertrain components.

== Controversies ==
In the episode "Bad boys: The Fastest Musclecar Engines", the show claimed that the vintage engines used were built to factory specs and tunings. This resulted in 1967 426 Hemi engine producing 820 hp and 689 lb-ft torque. However, Engine Systems Inc., the company that performed the dynamometer tests, reported that the motors were built as they would have been done in specialty dealers like Yenko, Mr. Norms, and so on. The parts used to build the replica engines came from specialty engine builders, and contained parts that did not meet factory specifications engines.

== Note ==
In The Episode S02E01 - Pontiac Firebird Trans Am, The full name of Trans Am is given as "Trans American Sedan Racing Series". This is incorrect. The actual name of Trans Am is the "Trans American Sedan Championship".

== Episodes ==
Season 1

- S01E01 - 1964 Pontiac GTO
- S01E02 - 1969 Pontiac GTO Judge
- S01E03 - 1953-62 Chevrolet Corvette
- S01E04 - 1967-69 Chevrolet Camaro SS 396
- S01E05 - 1964 Ford Fairlane Thunderbolt
- S01E06 - Ford Mustang Shelby GT-350
- S01E07 - Buick Gran Sport
- S01E08 - 1969-71 Hurst Oldsmobile 442
- S01E09 - Chevrolet Chevelle SS 396 & SS 454
- S01E10 - 1961-64 Chevrolet Impala 409
- S01E11 - Plymouth Hemi Cuda & Dodge Hemi Challenger
- S01E12 - 1968 Chevrolet Nova SS 396

Season 2

- S02E01 - Pontiac Firebird Trans Am
- S02E02 - 1959-1963 Pontiac 421 Super Duty
- S02E03 - Ford Fairlane GT
- S02E04 - 427 Cobra
- S02E05 - 1963-1967 Chevrolet Corvette
- S02E06 - Camaro Z/28
- S02E07 - Dodge Charger Daytona and Plymouth Superbird
- S02E08 - The Mopar Super Stockers
- S02E09 - American Motors AMX and Plymouth AAR 'Cuda
- S02E10 - Dodge Challenger T/A
- S02E11 - Buick Regal
- S02E12 - 1955-1957 Chevrolet Bel Air

Season 3

- S03E01 - Ford Thunderbird
- S03E02 - Ford Ranchero and Chevrolet El Camino
- S03E03 - The COPO cars
- S03E04 - 1968-2001 Corvette
- S03E05 - Chrysler 300
- S03E06 - The Dodge Ramchargers
- S03E07 - Dodge Charger
- S03E08 - Dodge Viper
- S03E09 - Boss 302 and 429 Mustangs
- S03E10 - The Saleen Mustangs
- S03E11 - The Hurst Cars
- S03E12 - The SLP Cars
- S03E13 - Dodge Dart GTS
- S03E14 - Plymouth Road Runner
