= Inside NASCAR =

- Presented by: Showtime series: Chris Myers (2010–2012)
- Starring: Showtime series: Michael Waltrip (2010–2012); Kyle Petty (2011–2012); Brad Daugherty (2010–2012); Randy Pemberton (2010); Susannah Collins (2011–2012)
- Country of origin: United States
- No. of episodes: 169 (Showtime)

Production
- Running time: 40 minutes (TNN); 60 minutes (Showtime)

Original release
- Network: The Nashville Network
- Release: 1985 – 2000
- Network: Showtime
- Release: 2010 – 2012

Inside NASCAR is a television show that was broadcast during the NASCAR season on Showtime. The show was hosted by Chris Myers while the analysts were Michael Waltrip, Brad Daugherty, Susannah Collins and Kyle Petty who replaced Randy Pemberton who was an analyst during the show's first season in 2010. Petty joined in 2011 as an analyst. The show was a 30 minutes show, that had new episodes weekly. After the 2012 season, Showtime announced that they would remove the show from their television schedule for the 2013 season. The show was noted for airing uncensored radio chatters, which is accompanied with analysis on such radio comments (radio chatter highlights were also aired on NASCAR Race Hub under the name of NASCAR Radioactive, although with censorship).

A previous show called Inside NASCAR was broadcast on TNN as part of NASCAR on TNN coverage, until CBS (TNN's parent company) lost the rights to NASCAR in late 2000. TNN's version of the show was also occasionally named Inside Winston Cup Racing until 1995 (not to be confused with the similarly-named Speedvision/Speed Channel show named Inside Winston Cup).
