= Formula One Decade =

- Starring: Bob Varsha; Steve Matchett; David Hobbs
- Country of origin: United States

Production
- Running time: 60 min. (approx.)

Original release
- Network: Speed Channel
- Release: May 11, 2003 – 2005

Formula One Decade is a television show on Speed Channel. First airing on May 11, 2003, the show took a look at Formula One Grand Prix events that were run 10 years prior to the present season. A one-hour show, the announcers, SPEED's Formula One commentary team, Bob Varsha, Steve Matchett, and David Hobbs, performed a mixture of a commentary as if the race was taking place right now along with reminiscing about rules changes and also Matchett's then role with Michael Schumacher's team. In 2003, when the show looked back at the 1993 season, dominated by Alain Prost, Varsha was the show's host, while Hobbs and Matchett looked at videotape of the races, and reminisced. That changed in 2004, when Matchett began introducing the race that would be seen on an episode and wrapping up each show, while Varsha joined Matchett and Hobbs to do commentary.

Speed Channel picked up the rights to broadcast the old races in their three-year agreement with FOM in 2003. It was included in their contract that allowed them to continue broadcasting live Formula One races, though it cost extra money, as the Formula One archives are rarely opened to any network.

On April 2, 2004, the show had the daunting task of airing the 1994 San Marino Grand Prix, and showing the crash that claimed the life of 3-time World Drivers' Champion, and 41-time Grand Prix race winner Ayrton Senna in that event. Matchett, a mechanic for Benetton-Ford that weekend, made these remarks at the beginning of the broadcast:

"Welcome to F1 Decade, Speed Channel's retrospective of the 1994 Formula 1 World Championship. We have reached round three-the San Marino Grand Prix. The constant, metronomic beat of the clock has led us, inescapably, to Imola, and when the date 1994 and the name of Imola are brought together, they combine to form nothing but black, somber memories. The events of that race weekend, from the morning of April 28, when the teams first assembled at the track, until the evening of Sunday, May 1, rest amongst motor racing's darkest times. It was a weekend of tragedy, despair, and death. 10 years on, it may be that some viewers would prefer not to watch the coverage of these events, and if you feel in any way unsure, then I urge you to switch off your TV now. We cannot shy away from the fact that three very serious accidents happened. (Note: There had already been two serious accidents in the days before Senna's on that race meeting, one on April 29 during Friday practice, that nearly killed Rubens Barrichello, and one on April 30 during Saturday qualifying that killed Roland Ratzenberger.) The events of Imola are a part of the sport's history. The aftermath of that horrible weekend would forever change the way Grand Prix cars are built, and forever change the way the races themselves are conducted. We at Speed Channel feel it is only proper that the 1994 San Marino Grand Prix is correctly documented, and that, in our opinion, must include correct coverage of Ayrton Senna's fatal accident."

The show returned in 2005, taking a look back at the 1995 season, when Michael Schumacher took his second straight World Drivers' Championship. F1 Decade was not renewed for 2006; if it had been, it would have looked back at Damon Hill's championship season in 1996.

== History ==
- The series' first episode took a look at the opening round of the 1993 Formula One season, the 1993 South African Grand Prix at Kyalami, which was the last South African Grand Prix ever held.
- A special edition of the show took place on September 26, 2003, during the weekend of the 2003 United States Grand Prix, when Jackie Stewart joined Hobbs to take a look back at the 1973 German Grand Prix at the Nürburgring, which Stewart won.
- On April 2, 2004, a special re-broadcast of the 1994 San Marino Grand Prix was aired to commemorate the 10th anniversary of the tragic deaths of Roland Ratzenberger and Ayrton Senna. The broadcast, as Steve Matchett said in the introduction to it, was not cut or edited to exclude Senna's fatal crash.
- Matchett worked on Johnny Herbert's car as a mechanic at Benetton. Herbert and Matchett both claimed their maiden Formula One wins in the 1995 British Grand Prix, a race perhaps made most famous for the fact that Michael Schumacher and Damon Hill crashed out of the race while battling for the lead. At episode's end, Matchett talked about how nervous he was during the closing laps of the race, and how much the win had meant to him. Said Matchett, "I freely confess that those closing laps at Silverstone rank amongst the most stressful times of my life! They seemed to take forever!" Herbert and Matchett would team up for another Formula One win in 1995 — the 1995 Italian Grand Prix at Monza, another race in which Schumacher and Hill crashed out together.
