= Payback (American TV series) =

American reality television series

Payback is a television show on the Speed Channel that debuted in 2006. In the show, celebrities who have made it big pay back one of the people in their lives who in the past helped them along the way to their success, by building them a tricked out, one of a kind, new car designed specifically for them.

== Plot ==
The show starts out by telling the story between the celebrity and the person who helped them out in the past (agent, parents, friend, etc.). Then the celebrity states the plans for the new car, but leaves room for the build team to add in some cool extras.

After that, the show turns over to the build team. This part of each episode takes place at a famous auto shop in Detroit, named Wheel to Wheel.

Finally, the climax of the show involves the celebrity handing over the new car's keys to the person who helped them out in the past, thanking them for all the help they have been.

== Celebrities ==
Celebrities who have appeared on the show include:

- Jay Leno
- Jim Caviezel
- Brooke Burke
- Dale Earnhardt Jr.
- Tim Duncan
- Korn
- Jaime Pressly
- Ken Shamrock
- Tim Allen
- Robert Downey Jr.
