= Dangerous Drives =

- Country of origin: United States
- Original language: English
- No. of seasons: 1
- No. of episodes: 13

Production
- Running time: 60 minutes

Original release
- Network: Speed
- Release: November 26, 2009 – March 31, 2010

Dangerous Drives is a documentary television series broadcast on Speed. The series first aired on Speed in the United States on November 26, 2009.

== Episodes ==
No.	Title	Original release date
1	"Heavy Haulers"	November 26, 2009
Eighteen wheelers haul towers and fan blades from Texas and Washington to wind farms in South Dakota.
2	"Prisoner Transport"	November 26, 2009
Dangerous criminals are transported across the country.
3	"Border Patrol"	November 26, 2009
California and Nevada state troopers patrol the U.S. border on the 4th of July Weekend.
4	"Million Dollar Highway"	November 26, 2009
A gang of motorcycle riders drive down the treacherous Highway 550 in Colorado.
5	"Highway Patrol"	December 30, 2009
Police officers from California and Nevada patrol a deadly stretch of Interstate 15, which connects Los Angeles and Las Vegas.
6	"Storm Chasers"	January 6, 2010
Veteran storm chasers track dangerous tornadoes in the Midwest.
7	"Executive Protection"	February 17, 2010
Protection teams are assigned to deliver dignitaries and VIP clients safely and quickly.
8	"Iraq Convoy"	February 24, 2010
The American Army's Heavy Equipment Transport must transport items and vehicles through a war zone in Iraq.
9	"Australian Road Trains"	March 3, 2010
The heaviest road-legal tractor trailers must travel the narrow highways connecting the territories of Australia.
10	"Log Hauling"	March 10, 2010
Log truckers must battle sleepiness, rain, fog to safely transport logs while also travelling down long, winding roads.
11	"Urban Rescue"	March 17, 2010
Emergency service teams in New Orleans and Camden, New Jersey face their everyday problems and must help out while keeping other drivers safe.
12	"Extreme Off Road"	March 24, 2010
A team of adventurers trek from Arches National Park in Utah to the dried-out lake bed of the Sevier Lake.
13	"Avalanche Road"	March 31, 2010
Highway crews work to keep a major Alaskan highway safe for travel during a winter that averages 550 inches of snow per season.
