= Mark Miles (sports executive) =

American auto racing executive

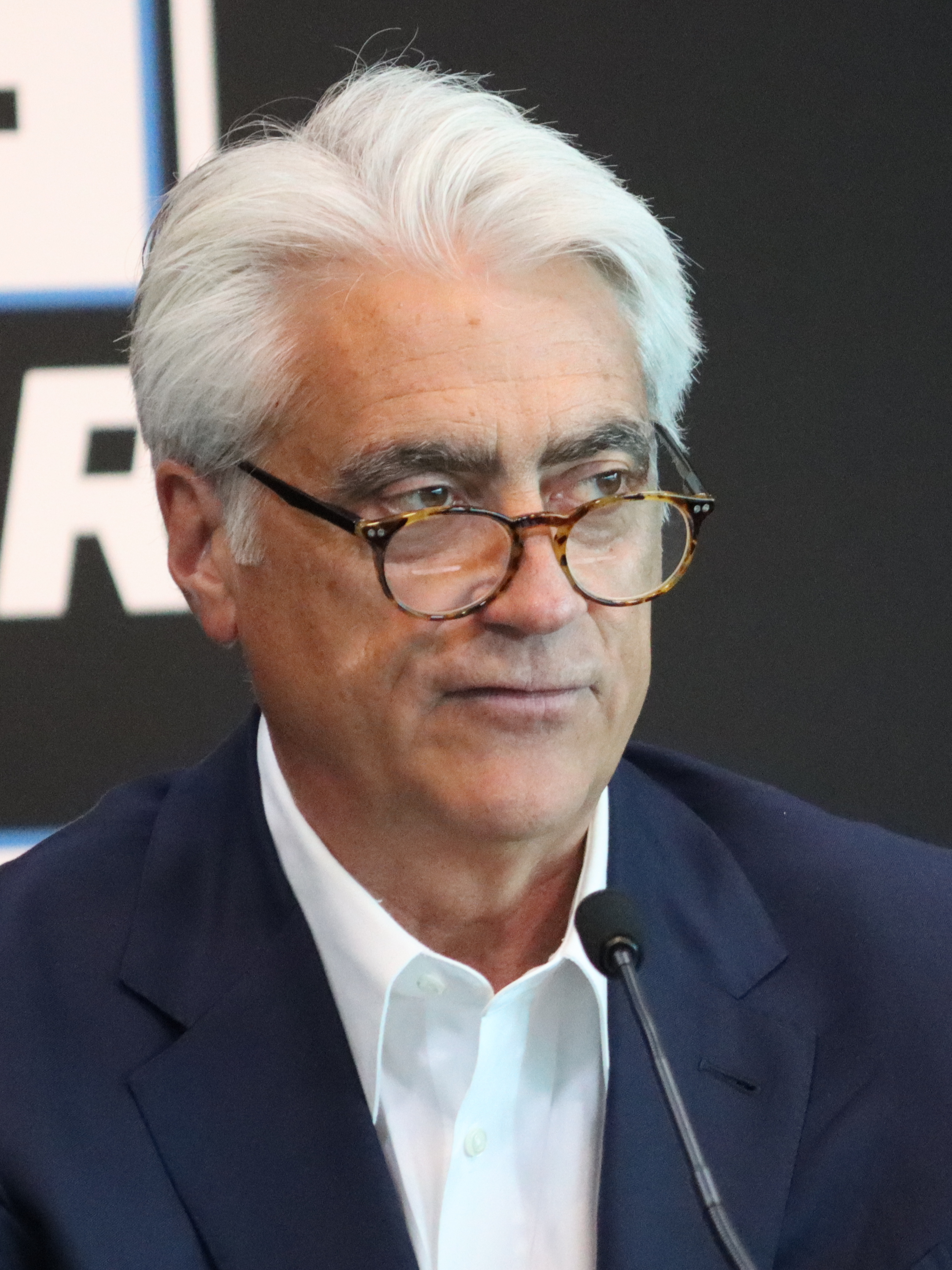
- Miles at Indianapolis Motor Speedway in 2022
- Born: September 2, 1953 (age 72); Indianapolis, Indiana, U.S.
- Education: Wabash College
- Occupation: CEO
- Employer: IndyCar

Mark Miles (born September 2, 1953) is an American sports executive and the current CEO of IndyCar and Penske Entertainment. He was also the former President of the Association of Tennis Professionals between 1990 and 2005.

Miles was instrumental in leading the committees which landed Indianapolis the 1987 Pan American Games and Super Bowl XLVI.

== Biography ==
Miles was born in Indianapolis, Indiana in 1953, one of five children. His father worked for Eli Lilly and Company and his mother was a teacher. He attended Broad Ripple High School and graduated from North Central High School. Miles attended Wabash College where he studied political science and was a member of the tennis team.

As a college student, Miles accepted a job working for the re-election campaign of Indianapolis mayor Richard Lugar, responsible for mobilizing young voters.

In the 1979 Indianapolis mayoral election, Miles served as campaign manager for the successful re-election of Mayor William Hudnut.

In 1980, Miles served as campaign manager for Dan Quayle's successful campaign for U. S. Senate, defeating three-term incumbent Democrat Birch Bayh with 54% of the vote. Miles then served as Quayle's chief of staff for less than one year. He later recalled, "I failed, I think, as Dan’s chief of staff. I was not really equipped. I didn’t really know the legislative process, I didn’t know other members and their staffs. And I didn’t really want to be there." He returned to Indianapolis and started a direct mail company.

== 1987 Pan American Games ==
In 1984, Miles was instrumental in leading Indianapolis' bid to host the 1987 Pan American Games. He was the President of the organizing committee called Pan American Ten/Indianapolis (PAX/I), serving under Chairman Theodore R. Boehm. He led eighteen operating divisions, 300 paid staff, and 37,000 volunteers.

Miles was briefly at the center of controversy in April 1987 when he led a delegation of Games officials to Cuba to meet with Fidel Castro. The purpose was to ensure Cuban participation in the games, while Miles' former employer, Senator Dan Quayle, accused him of overstepping constitutional bounds and "attempting to capitalize on the infamy and notoriety of Fidel Castro."

"We have done nothing to court Fidel Castro," Miles reaffirmed. "We have done all that we can to ensure that Cuban athletes will participate. It may be that some people have problems making the distinction."

The Pan Am Games brought about $175 million (1988 USD, $355.1 million 2016 USD) to Indianapolis's economy. Hosting the Games cost about $30 million. Indianapolis was the first Pan American Games host city to break even financially.

Hosting the games also attracted many sports organizations to consider Indianapolis as a site for their headquarters, most notably the National Collegiate Athletic Association.

Between 1985 and 1990, Miles served as president and Tournament Director of the Indianapolis Tennis Championships. What began as the U.S. Men's Clay Court Championships, Miles made the decision to change the surface to Deco-Turf II, the same surface as the US Open. The tournament was moved close to the U.S. Open and positioned as a warm-up event for the Grand Slam tournament. Top-seeded players like Boris Becker, John McEnroe, and Pete Sampras won in the early years and the tournament won 10 consecutive Association of Tennis Professionals Tournament of the Year awards.

Beginning in 1988, Miles served as executive director of corporate relations for Eli Lilly & Company.

== Association of Tennis Professionals ==
Miles' success leading the Indianapolis Tennis Championships led to his hiring as the CEO of the Association of Tennis Professionals in 1990. During his leadership, the ATP saw growth with sponsorships and international expansion. The ATP increased yearly revenues to over $2 billion, and established a highly successful retirement fund for tennis professionals.

Miles' leadership was questioned by some in early 1999 as a drug controversy ensnared professional tennis. Petr Korda was suspended as he tested positive for the banned anabolic steroid Nandrolone. Jim Courier alleged that Blood doping was common, especially among European players. Amid this, Thomas Muster criticized Miles for what he considered "very weak" leadership on the drug issue.

In April 1999, Miles negotiated a deal to sell the television and sponsorship rights of the ATP's nine major events to ISL Worldwide, a Zurich-based sports marketing agency for the sum of $1.2 billion. In May 2001, ISL declared bankruptcy and left the ATP in financial danger. The organization laid off 15% of their staff and prize pools declined across its tournaments.

In 2003, Miles faced a tough year as the head of the ATP. The ATP faced a doping crisis when they were forced to overturn a suspension for Bohdan Ulihrach when an investigation found its trainers had unknowingly administered players with supplements containing the banned steroid nandrolone between August 2002 and May 2003. The ATP was criticized by the World Anti-Doping Agency, claiming that the internal investigation done by the ATP was biased and not a proper investigation.

Miles and the ATP fostered an acrimonious relationship with the controversial world number one player, Lleyton Hewitt. In summer 2002, the ATP fined Hewitt $103,000 when he refused to do a required television interview with ESPN before a first round match in Cincinnati. The fine was reduced to $35,000 on appeal. Hewitt called the ATP leadership liars, saying at the US Open, "I think a lot of people lied, I think that is a known fact." Further saying, "Yeah, there are people at the ATP who don't treat you the way they should." In early 2003, Hewitt pledged his support to a players' union, the International Men's Tennis Federation, that aimed to improve representation for players in negotiations with the ATP. He also reduced his participation in ATP events.

In June 2003, Hewitt filed a $2.5 million defamation lawsuit against the ATP. It alleged the body had targeted him since 1998 and made media statement that portrayed him as a troublemaker. It also alleged that the ATP sent a man to Hewitt in Zurich who attempted to get him to sign a document of refusal for drug testing. Had he signed, he would have received a two-year ban.

Amid the backdrop of the 2003 Wimbledon Championships, Miles threatened a player boycott of the Grand Slam tournaments if the ITF, the sanctioning body of the Grand Slams, failed to more than double prize money. Miles asked players to sign a "participation agreement" should the ATP decide to boycott Grand Slams and hold an "alternate event" to the 2003 US Open if demands were not met. Tom Ross, the agent of Lleyton Hewitt, was critical of the ATP's handling of the boycott talk. "We can't have envisioned a more counterproductive approach than what the ATP has done here. If I thought this was the price we'd have to pay to get what the players really want, that would be one thing, but instead, our clients are the ones who will end up worse off than before." In early July, the Grand Slam leaders refused to meet the prize money demands but agreed to create two committees: one to address marketing and promotion issues, the other to address the tennis calendar for 2005 and beyond.

Miles and the ATP faced an issue of match fixing, as it was reported in October 2003 by The Sunday Telegraph newspaper in London that suspicious bets were placed by players in matches. An ATP trainer offered his services to one bookmaker, promising to alert them to news of injured players. In late 2003, the ATP signed a memorandum of understanding with Betfair, which give the ATP access to its clients' records.

Miles chose to leave the ATP at the conclusion of his contract in 2005 and led the search for his successor. His time as CEO was described as leading "often brilliantly but sometimes haltingly."

After leaving the ATP, Miles became president and CEO of the Central Indiana Corporate Partnership, a not-for-profit alliance of corporate CEOs and university presidents who work to foster economic development and growth in central Indiana. He also served on the board of directors for The Pantry chain of convenience stores.

== Super Bowl XLVI ==
In 2008, Miles was named chairman of Indianapolis' committee to host Super Bowl XLVI. In May 2008, NFL Franchise owners awarded the Super Bowl to Indianapolis, beating the bids of Houston, Texas and Glendale, Arizona.

== IndyCar ==
In 2012, Miles was hired as president and CEO of Hulman & Company, the parent company of IndyCar and the Indianapolis Motor Speedway. He replaced the recently departed Randy Bernard.

Miles moved the season finale from October to around Labor Day to avoid competing for attention with the NFL and college football. He quickly dropped IndyCar's strategy of holding doubleheader races at the same track in order to hold races in a greater number of markets. Under his leadership, the series began holding races at the Indianapolis Road Course.

Announced by his predecessor, he oversaw the implementation of manufacture specific aerokits in 2015, and then the elimination of the aerokits in 2018.

Miles oversaw a new television deal that placed IndyCar with a single television partner, NBC, beginning in 2019. The series had been split between ABC and NBC for many years and it was believed the split television deal hurt series promotion.

In late-2019, Roger Penske purchased the Indianapolis Motor Speedway and IndyCar from Hulman & Company. Miles was retained as CEO of Penske Entertainment. Miles was part of the leadership team that successfully navigated IndyCar through the COVID-19 pandemic and the quickly reorganized 2020 IndyCar Series schedule.

In 2024, Miles has been a part of a Penske Entertainment leadership team that has navigated IndyCar through a series of missteps by the organization.
