= Steve Matchett =

British former motor racing mechanic, author, columnist and television commentator

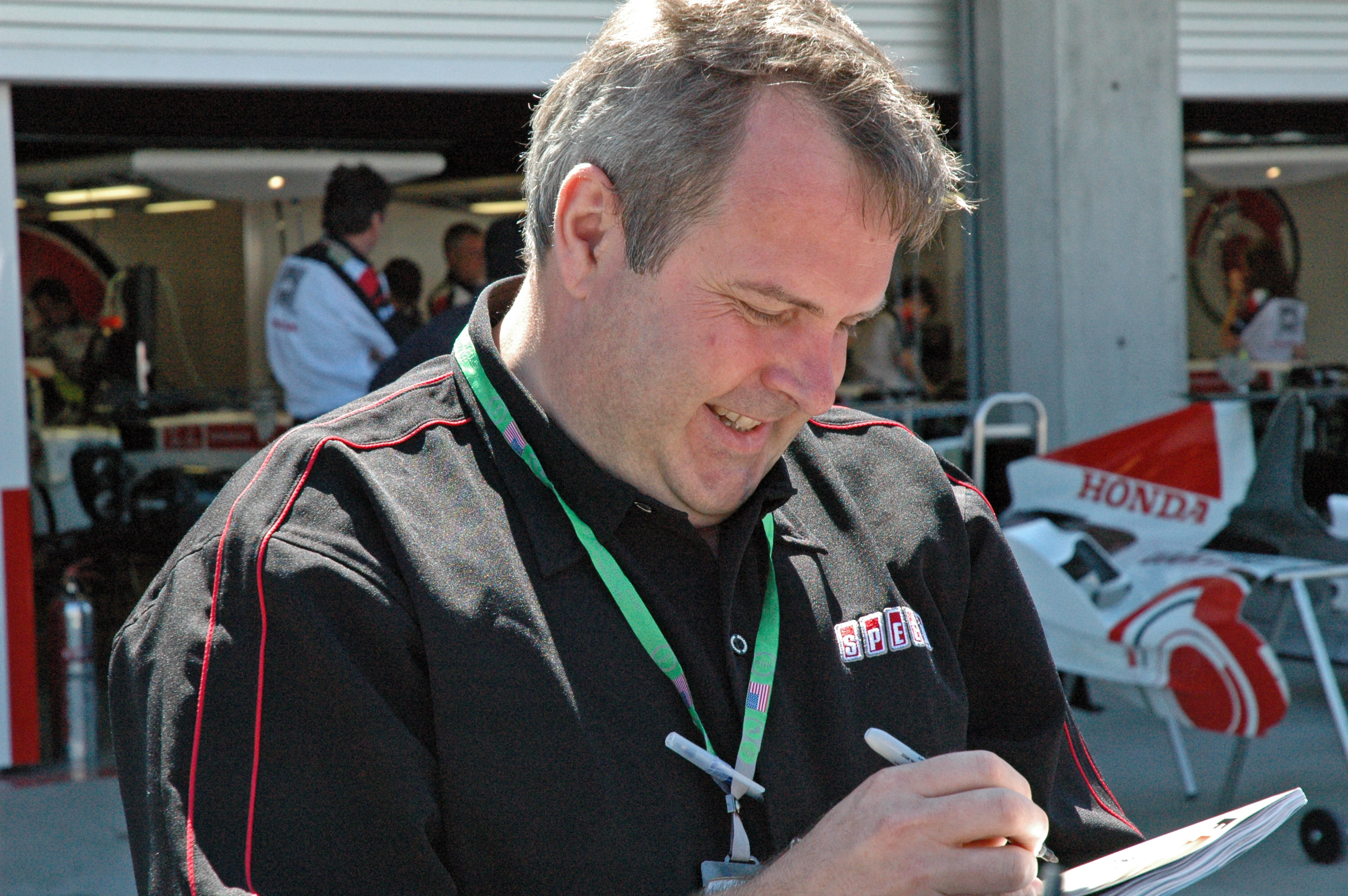
- Matchett at the 2005 United States Grand Prix
- Born: 23 December 1962 (age 63); England
- Occupations: Author, columnist, editor, television broadcaster
- Writing career
- Genre: Formula One

Steve Matchett (born 23 December 1962 in England) is a commentator for American TV network Fox Sports on its Formula E programming. He formerly co-hosted live Formula One practices, qualifying sessions, and races alongside David Hobbs and Bob Varsha.

As well as his live F1 duties, Matchett also co-presented with the same duo a pre-recorded show on Speed Channel called Formula One Debrief, reviewing the events of the preceding week's grand prix.

Until the conclusion of the 2012 Formula One season, he was a commentator for the FOX owned American Speed Channel. For the 2013 Formula One season, he was signed to NBC Sports Network, alongside Speed veteran David Hobbs until broadcasts moved to ESPN for the 2018 season.

He was a columnist for the Speed Channel website and presented a series of web-based video 'chalk-talk' features in which, with photographs and a telestrator, he explains F1 engineering and technical matters.

He was a regular contributor and columnist to F1 Racing magazine from 1996 to 2008. He was Technical Editor of the magazine from 1998 to 2008 (resigning his editorship when Matt Bishop resigned as Editor-in-Chief).

He has also published a semi-autobiographical trilogy based around his years in the F1 pit lane.

== Education ==
Loughborough University (technical college) 1979–1982, City & Guilds Mechanical Engineering Apprenticeship

== Early career ==
In 1977, he started working as a mechanic for Howlett's of Loughborough performing routine service for Mazda and Vauxhall vehicles. He joined Graypaul Motors in 1986, a UK Ferrari dealership; then to a BMW dealership from 1988 to 1989. In January 1989 he was employed at a Cooper-BMW dealership in Rothley near Loughborough for exactly one year. He began his F1 career in 1990.

== Formula One ==
Employed by Nigel Stepney, Matchett worked as a race mechanic with the Benetton F1 team from 1 February 1990 through 13 February 1998. During this period Michael Schumacher won the Drivers' Championship in both 1994 and 1995 before leaving the team, moving to Ferrari the following year; while Matchett and his team won the Constructors' Championship in 1995. Throughout his time with Benetton he worked with many key drivers and personalities of the era: Michael Schumacher, Nelson Piquet, Riccardo Patrese, Martin Brundle, Johnny Herbert, Gerhard Berger and Jean Alesi all drove F1 cars prepared by Matchett.

Herbert and Matchett both claimed their maiden Formula One wins in the 1995 British Grand Prix, a race perhaps made most famous for the fact that Michael Schumacher and Damon Hill crashed out of the race while battling for the lead. Although Matchett had by this time experienced many wins as part of the Benetton team, the win at Silverstone was significant as it was the first Benetton victory secured by a Matchett prepared car. Ten years later, in his closing remarks of the relevant episode of Formula 1 Decade Matchett described his feelings during the closing laps of that landmark race, and how much the win had meant to him. Said Matchett:

I freely confess that those closing laps at Silverstone rank amongst the most stressful times of my life; they seemed to take forever!

Herbert and Matchett would team up for another Formula One win in at the 1995 Italian Grand Prix held at Monza, another race in which Schumacher and Hill crashed out together. His career as a mechanic was brought to an end by a back injury (from which he has since recovered) sustained while operating the rear jack on a car during a pre-race practice session.

Throughout his Benetton career Matchett formed a close working relationship with both Stepney and Ross Brawn who was then technical director of Benetton. Brawn and Matchett remained on amicable terms even after Brawn's move to Ferrari at the end of 1996 and Matchett's own move into television four years later. During the Speed Channel Formula One broadcasts Matchett often cites conversations he has had with Brawn – and indeed other leading F1 engineers – by way of explaining to his viewers the pressing technical issues of the day.

== Television ==
He made his television debut for Speedvision in 2000 filling in as a substitute commentator during the Canadian GP weekend while regular analysts Sam Posey and David Hobbs were at Le Mans covering the 24 hour race. He joined the crew for two more races in 2000, then joined Speedvision's F1 broadcast crew full-time in 2001. In late 2001 Speedvision was acquired by Fox Television, rebranded as Speed Channel and relocated to Charlotte, North Carolina. Matchett made the switch to Charlotte. Matchett remained with the network until the end of the 2012 season, at which point he joined his colleagues in moving to NBC and NBC Sports.

His broadcasting niche is one of giving priority to the teams' involvement, rather than to any specific driver. During the Speed Channel shows he has often stated that the Constructors Championship is of greater significance to him than the Drivers Championship. At the end of each race show, David Hobbs reads out the driver points; Matchett always reads out the team points. Unlike his co-announcers, Matchett's unique approach is to talk of the races from the perspective of the competing teams (the engineer's view) rather than the driver's perspective. He describes the track's challenges to the various GP teams and describes how the mechanics prepare the 'set up' of the race cars to try and win the race.

He is also credited with the ability to notice minor changes that the mechanics have made to the cars and for his ability to spot mechanical problems on the cars even while they are running on the circuit. In addition to his duties calling the racing action, Matchett also estimates when the cars will be visiting the pits for fuel and tires.

From 2003 to 2005, Matchett also hosted Speed Channel's Formula 1 Decade.

On 2 April 2004, the show had the daunting task of airing the 1994 San Marino Grand Prix, showing the crash that claimed the life of three-time World Drivers' Champion and 41-time Grand Prix race winner Ayrton Senna. Matchett, a mechanic for Benetton-Ford that weekend, made these remarks at the beginning of the broadcast:

Welcome to F1 Decade, Speed Channel's retrospective of the 1994 Formula 1 World Championship. We have reached round three – the San Marino Grand Prix. The constant, metronomic beat of the clock has led us, inescapably, to Imola, and when the date 1994 and the name of Imola are brought together, they combine to form nothing but black, somber memories. The events of that race weekend, from the morning of April 28, when the teams first assembled at the track, until the evening of Sunday, May 1, rest amongst motor racing's darkest times. It was a weekend of tragedy, despair, and death. Ten years on, it may be that some viewers would prefer not to watch the coverage of these events, and if you feel in any way unsure, then I urge you to switch off your TV now. We cannot shy away from the fact that three very serious accidents happened.* The events of Imola are a part of the sport's history. The aftermath of that horrible weekend would forever change the way Grand Prix cars are built, and forever change the way the races themselves are conducted. We at Speed Channel feel it is only proper that the 1994 San Marino Grand Prix is correctly documented, and that, in our opinion, must include correct coverage of Ayrton Senna's fatal accident.

(*)-There had already been two serious accidents in the days before Senna's, one on 29 April during Friday practice that nearly killed Rubens Barrichello, and one on 30 April during Saturday qualifying that killed Roland Ratzenberger.

Since 2007, Matchett has hosted an annual series of technical features for SPEED called RPM - Racing Per Matchett in which he interviews key members of the Renault F1, Red Bull Racing and McLaren F1 teams, explaining to the viewers different features of modern race car design and ultra-exotic technology.

In January 2008 he also hosted the first visit to America by BMW Sauber's popular Pit Lane Park Formula One show, supporting the prestigious Consumer Electronics Show in Las Vegas. He also emceed the four-day event alongside Mark Goodman of Sirius Satellite Radio, one of MTV's original VJs. Graham Rahal son of Indy 500 winner Bobby Rahal drove a BMW Sauber F1.06 car in a series of demonstration runs during the event.

In 2009 Matchett presented a thirty-minute show for Speed Channel called Always Ferrari, in which he visited the famous Italian marque's Maranello factory, toured the road car restoration division, the Formula 1 racing headquarters and there interviewed F1 team members including drivers Felipe Massa and Kimi Räikkönen.

== Bibliography ==
Matchett's Formula One trilogy:

- Part One: Life in the Fast Lane.
- Publishing reference: Steve Matchett (1995). Life in the Fast Lane: The Story of the Benetton Grand Prix Year. Weidenfeld and Nicolson. ISBN 0-297-81610-1.
- Part Two: The Mechanic's Tale.
- Publishing reference: Steve Matchett (1999). The Mechanic's Tale: Life in the Pit Lanes of Formula One. MBI Pub. ISBN 0-7603-0754-7.
- Part Three: The Chariot Makers.
- Publishing reference: Steve Matchett (2004). The Chariot Makers: Assembling the Perfect Formula 1 Car. Orion Media. ISBN 0-7528-5649-9.
