= Texas Hardtails =

American TV series

Texas Hardtails is a thirty-minute TV series with 10 episodes aired in the United States in 2005. It aired on the Speed Channel.

== Cast and crew ==
Directed by Brad Kimmel and Jeff Hare, the show's runtime is 30 minutes and features motorcycle builder Rick Fairless. The cast is almost entirely made up of Strokers Dallas employees, who play a scripted version of themselves.
