= Dale Earnhardt (disambiguation) =

Dale Earnhardt (1951–2001) was an American professional stock car racing driver and team owner.

Dale Earnhardt may also refer to:

- Dale Earnhardt, Inc., his racing team founded in 1980
- Dale Earnhardt Jr. (born 1974), Dale's son born Ralph Dale Earnhardt Jr.
- Kerry Earnhardt (born 1969), Dale's eldest son born Kerry Dale Earnhardt
- Bobby Dale Earnhardt (born 1987), Dale's grandson born Bobby Dale Earnhardt

== Media ==
- 3: The Dale Earnhardt Story (2004)
- Dale (2007)
- I Am Dale Earnhardt (2015)
- Unrivaled: Earnhardt vs. Gordon (2019)
- Earnhardt (2025)

== See also ==
- Dale
- Earnhardt
