= Earhart (surname) =

Earhart or Earhardt is a surname. Notable people with the surname include:

- Ainsley Earhardt (born 1976), American television personality and author
- Amelia Earhart (born 1897; disappeared 1937), American aviation pioneer and author
- Daniel S. Earhart (1907–1976), U.S. Representative from Ohio
- Fred A. Earhart (1875–1948), acting mayor of New Orleans for one day on July 15, 1936
- Harry Boyd Earhart (1870–1954), American business executive and philanthropist
- James Otto Earhart (1943–1999), American murderer
- Ralph Earhart (1923–1997), American football halfback
- Will Earhart (1871–1960), pioneering American music educator

== See also ==
- Earheart
- Earnhardt
- Amelia Earhart (disambiguation)
