= Walter S. Diehl =

Walter S. Diehl may refer to:

- Walter Stuart Diehl (1893–1976), an American naval officer and pioneer in aerodynamics and aeronautical design.
- USNS Walter S. Diehl, a United States Navy fleet replenishment oiler in service with the Military Sealift Command since 1988
