= Earhart (disambiguation) =

Amelia Earhart (1897 – disappeared 1937) was an American aviation pioneer and author.

Earhart may also refer to:

- Earhart (surname)
- 3895 Earhart, a main-belt asteroid named after Amelia Earhart
- Earhart (moon), an informal name of the moonlet of Saturn named after Amelia Earhart, 400 metre in diameter
- Earhart Environmental Magnet Elementary School, Wichita, Kansas
- Earhart Expressway, a state highway in Louisiana named after Fred A. Earhart
- Earhart Foundation, an American charitable foundation founded by Harry Boyd Earhart
- Earhart Hall, a Purdue University residential hall

== See also ==
- Earhart House, Ellett, Virginia, on the National Register of Historic Places
