= Earheart =

Earheart is a surname. Notable people with the surname include:

- Billy Earheart (1954–2025), American country pianist, keyboardist, and organist
- James E. Earheart Jr. (1913–1942), a Silver Star-decorated US Marine killed in action during World War II

== See also ==
- USS Earheart (APD-113), a US Navy ship named after James E. Earheart Jr.
- Earhart (disambiguation)
- Erhart
- Earnhardt
