= Amelia Earhart (disambiguation) =

Amelia Earhart (1897 – disappeared 1937) was an American aviation pioneer and author.

Amelia Earhart may also refer to:

== Entertainment ==
- Amelia Earhart (film), a 1976 two-part television miniseries
- Amelia Earhart: The Final Flight, a 1994 television film
- Amelia Earhart: The Lost Evidence, a 2017 television documentary
- "Amelia Earhart's Last Flight", a 1937 song by "Red River" Dave McEnery

== People ==
- Amelia Rose Earhart (born 1983), American private pilot and former reporter

== Places ==
all in the United States

- Amelia Earhart Airport, a public-use airport near Atchison, Kansas
  - Amelia Earhart Hangar Museum, an aviation museum located at this airport
- Amelia Earhart Birthplace, a historic building in Atchison, Kansas
- Amelia Earhart Dam, an earth-fill dam near Boston, Massachusetts
- Amelia Earhart Memorial Bridge, a truss bridge over the Missouri River between Kansas and Missouri
- Amelia Earhart Park, an urban park in metropolitan Miami, Florida
- Amelia Earhart Peak, a mountain in California

== Ships ==
- USNS Amelia Earhart (T-AKE-6), a U.S. Navy cargo ship launched in 2008
- SS Amelia Earhart, an American Liberty ship built during World War II

== See also ==
- Earhart (disambiguation)
- In Search of Amelia Earhart, a 1972 album by Plainsong
- Statue of Amelia Earhart, in Washington, D.C.
