= ARM Papaloapan =

ARM Papaloapan may refer to one of the following vessels of the Mexican Navy:

- ARM Papaloapan (1944), the former American Tacoma-class frigate USS Gladwyne (PF-62), launched in January 1944; acquired by the Mexican Navy, 24 November 1947; scrapped, 1965
- ARM Papaloapan (H04), the former American Crosley-class high speed transport USS Earheart (APD-113), launched in May 1945; acquired by the Mexican Navy, 12 December 1963; reassigned pennant number of B04; ran aground and stricken, 1976
- ARM Papaloapan (A411), the former lead ship of the American Newport class of tank landing ship, USS Newport (LST-1179), launched in February 1968; acquired by the Mexican Navy, 23 May 2001; in active service
