= Richard Childress Racing Museum =

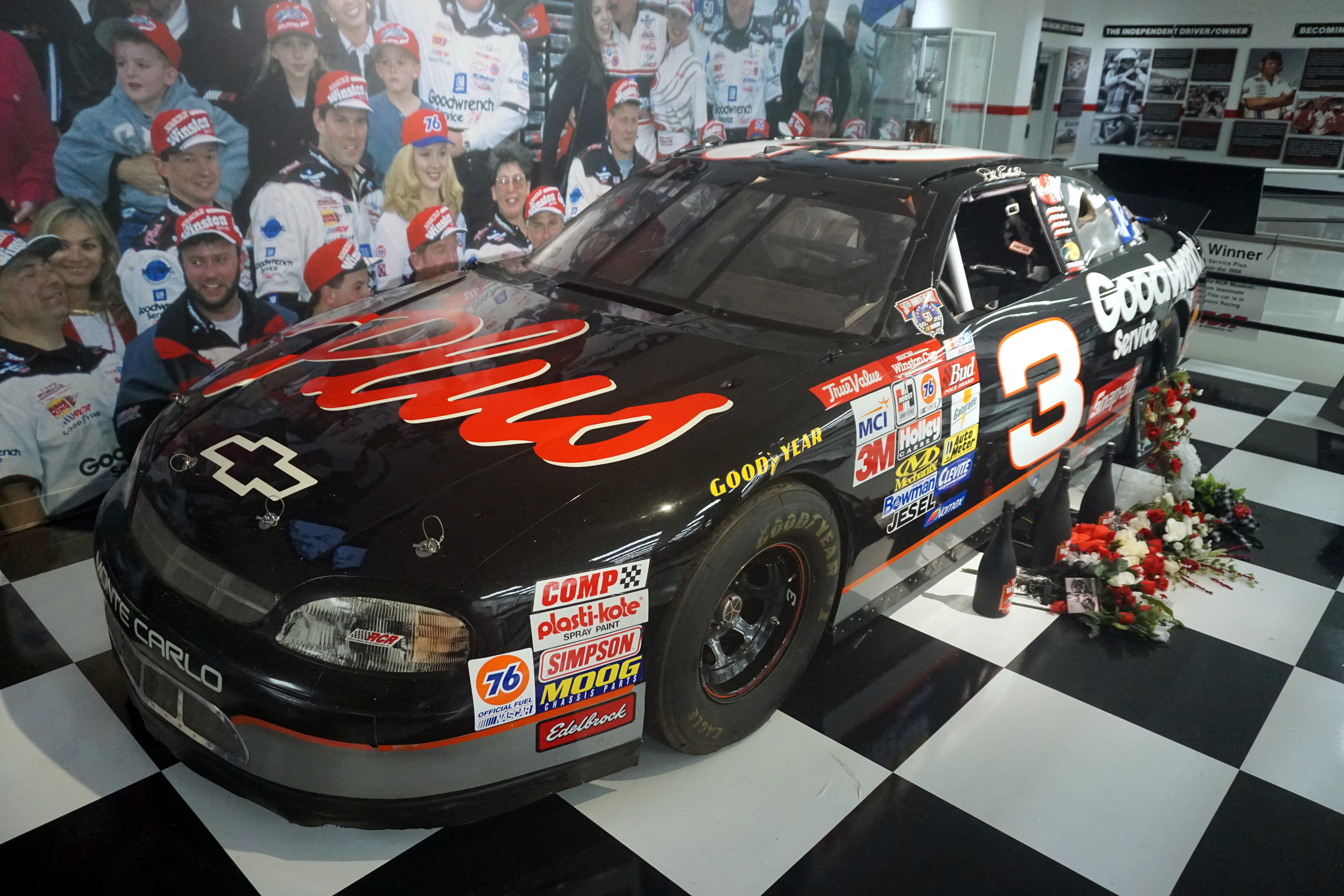
- Dale Earnhardt's 1998 Daytona 500-winning car at the Richard Childress Racing Museum

- Location within North Carolina
- Established: May 2003
- Location: Welcome, North Carolina, United States
- Coordinates: 35°54′25″N 80°15′17″W
- Type: Stock car racing museum
- Key holdings: Dale Earnhardt's NASCAR Cup Series cars
- Founder: Richard Childress
- Curator: Danny "Chocolate" Myers
- Owner: Richard Childress Racing
- Website: www.rcrracing.com/rcr-museum/

The Richard Childress Racing Museum (RCR Museum) is a stock car racing museum located in Welcome, North Carolina in the United States. It opened in May 2003.

== History ==
Covering 47,000 square feet (4,400 m^{2}), the museum was previously Richard Childress Racing (RCR)'s workshop. After it was replaced by a newer and larger facility in 2002, Richard Childress redeveloped it as a museum. RCR won six NASCAR Cup Series championships and 58 race wins while using the current museum as its team workshop. The museum outlines the history of RCR, beginning with Childress's own career as a driver. The curator of the museum is Danny "Chocolate" Myers, a former pit crew member for Dale Earnhardt's team, who also often records his SiriusXM NASCAR Radio show at the museum.

== Collections ==
The RCR Museum contains over 50 race cars, more than half of which were driven by Earnhardt. It contains the largest collection of Earnhardt's black #3 GM Goodwrench-sponsored Chevrolets anywhere in the world, most notably including his 1998 Daytona 500-winning car. Other Earnhardt cars of note on display include his 1995 Brickyard 400-winning car and all of his non-black cars from NASCAR All-Star Races between 1995 and 2000.

In addition to Earnhardt's cars, the RCR Museum also includes stock cars driven by Childress, Austin Dillon, Robby Gordon, and Kevin Harvick, as well as a truck driven by Mike Skinner. Among these cars is Harvick's first winning NASCAR Cup Series car, which was victorious at Atlanta Motor Speedway in 2001, shortly after Earnhardt's death at Daytona International Speedway. In addition to Cup Series cars, the museum also displays cars that raced in the NASCAR Xfinity Series, NASCAR Camping World Truck Series, and ARCA Racing Series, in addition to one of Earnhardt's car haulers. As of 2004, every car in the museum had an operational engine.

The RCR Museum's galleries have been built in the engine workshop, fabrication room, and research and development department of the former team workshop. Childress's own office has also been preserved as part of the museum. In addition to the museum's primary focus on stock car racing, it also includes a hunting and conservation gallery that displays mounted animals killed by Childress on his hunting trips. Animals included in this gallery include brown bears, a cougar, a Cape buffalo, elk, a polar bear, and white-tailed deer. In 2003, the museum was donating $1 from each admission ticket to a group of conservation organizations that included Ducks Unlimited, the National Wild Turkey Foundation, the North Carolina Wildlife Habitat Foundation, and the Rocky Mountain Elk Foundation.

== Gallery ==
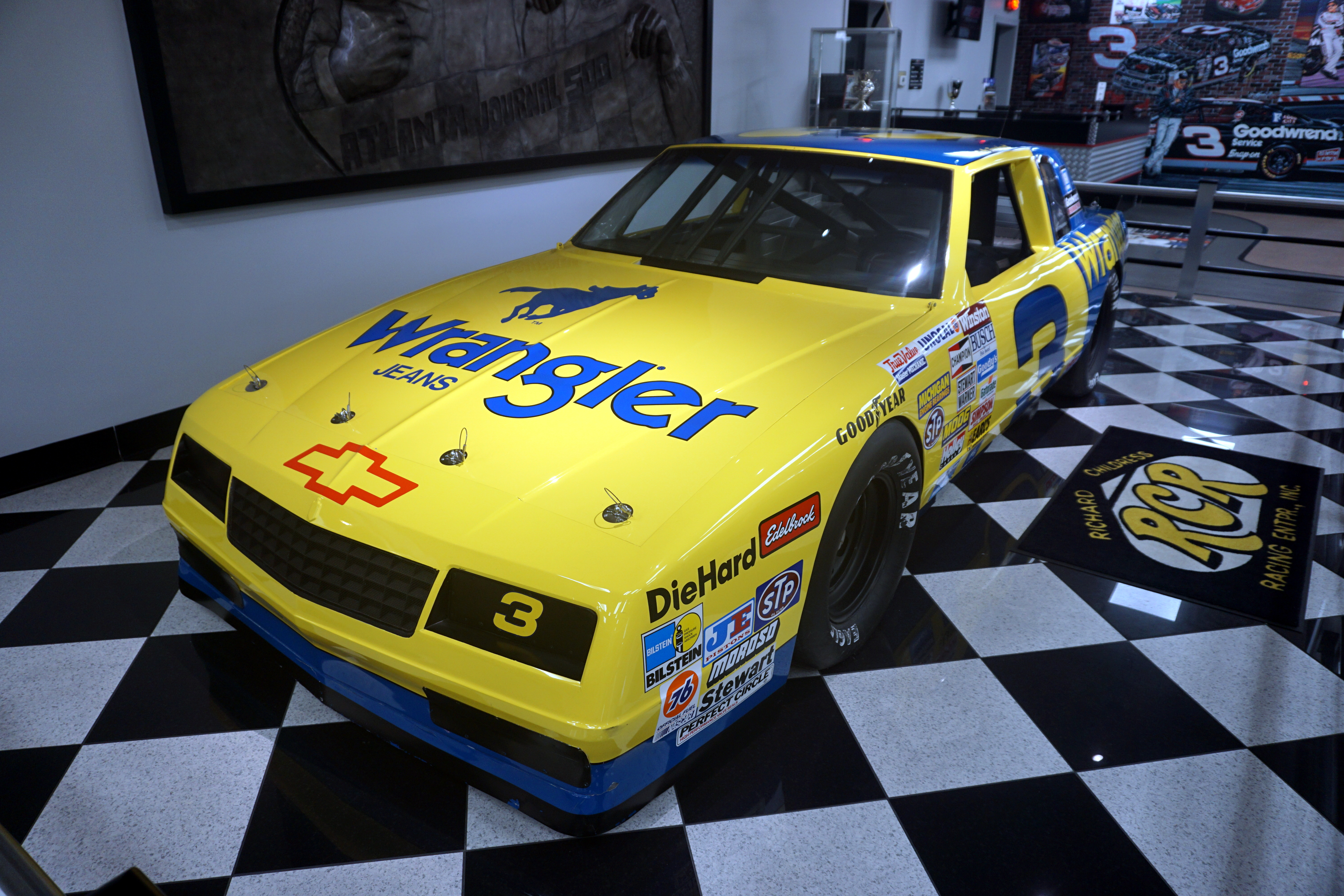
Dale Earnhardt's No. 3 Wrangler Chevrolet Monte Carlo

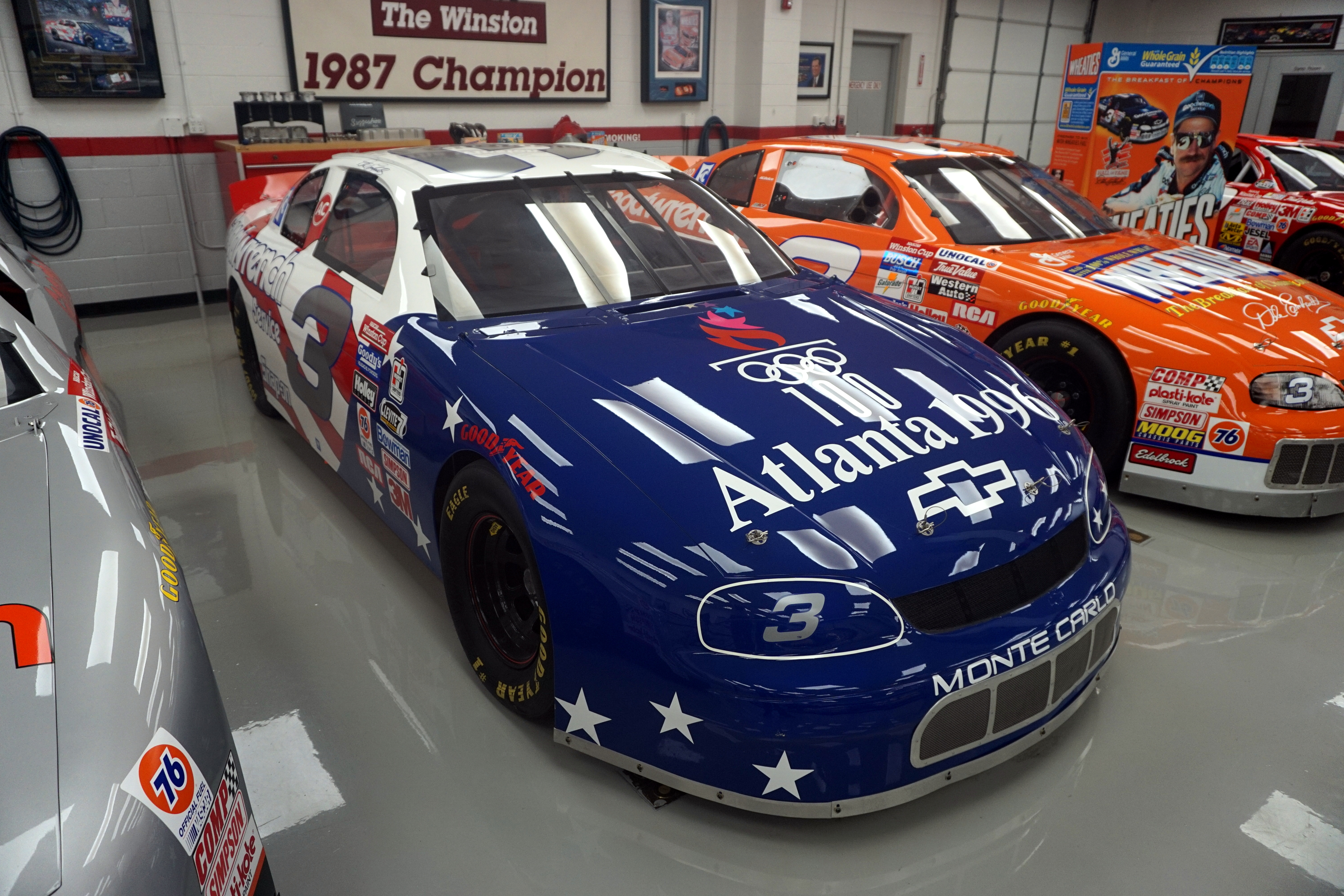
Earnhardt's No. 3 Atlanta 1996 Chevrolet Monte Carlo

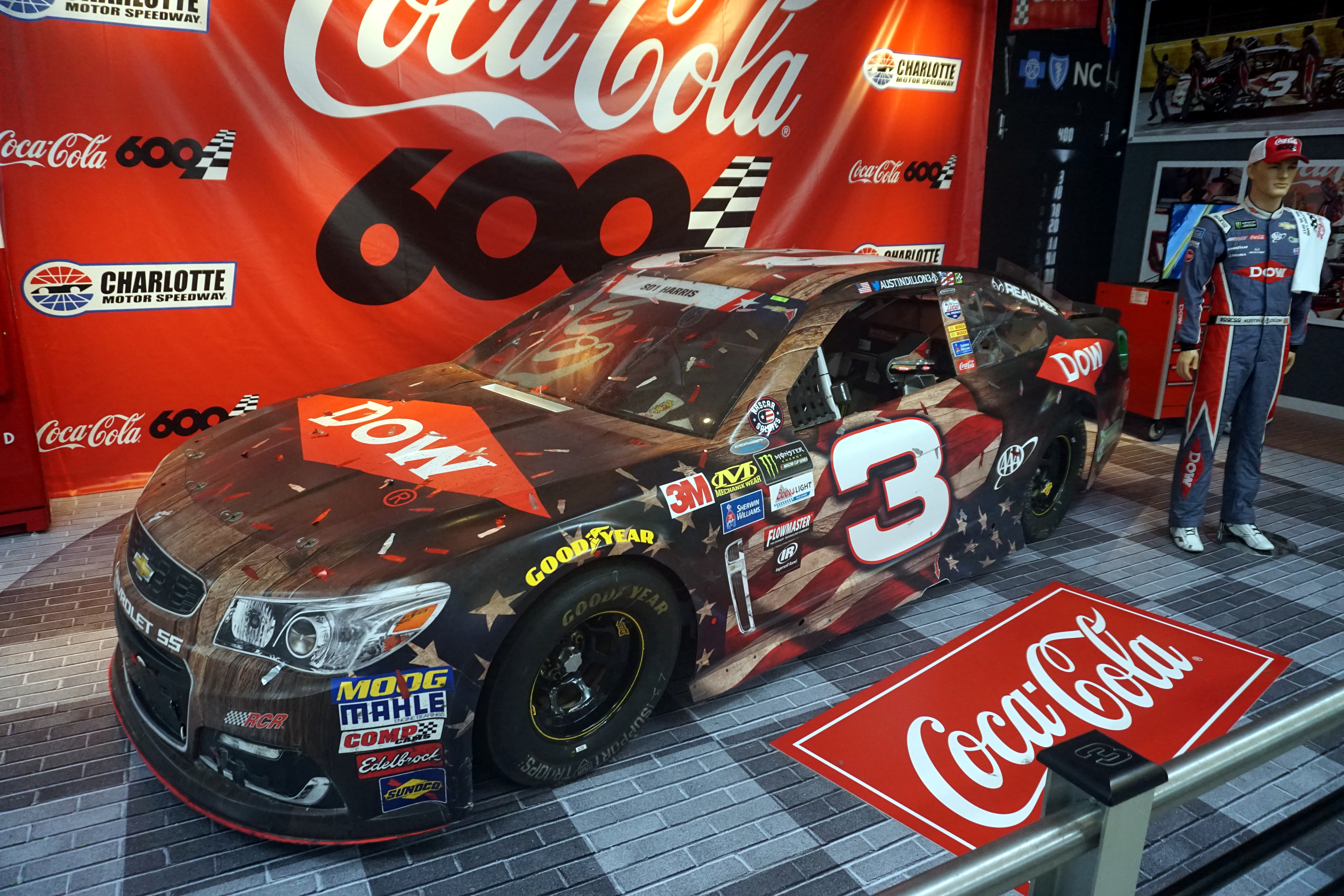
Austin Dillon's 2017 Coca-Cola 600-winning No. 3 Dow Chemical Company Chevrolet SS

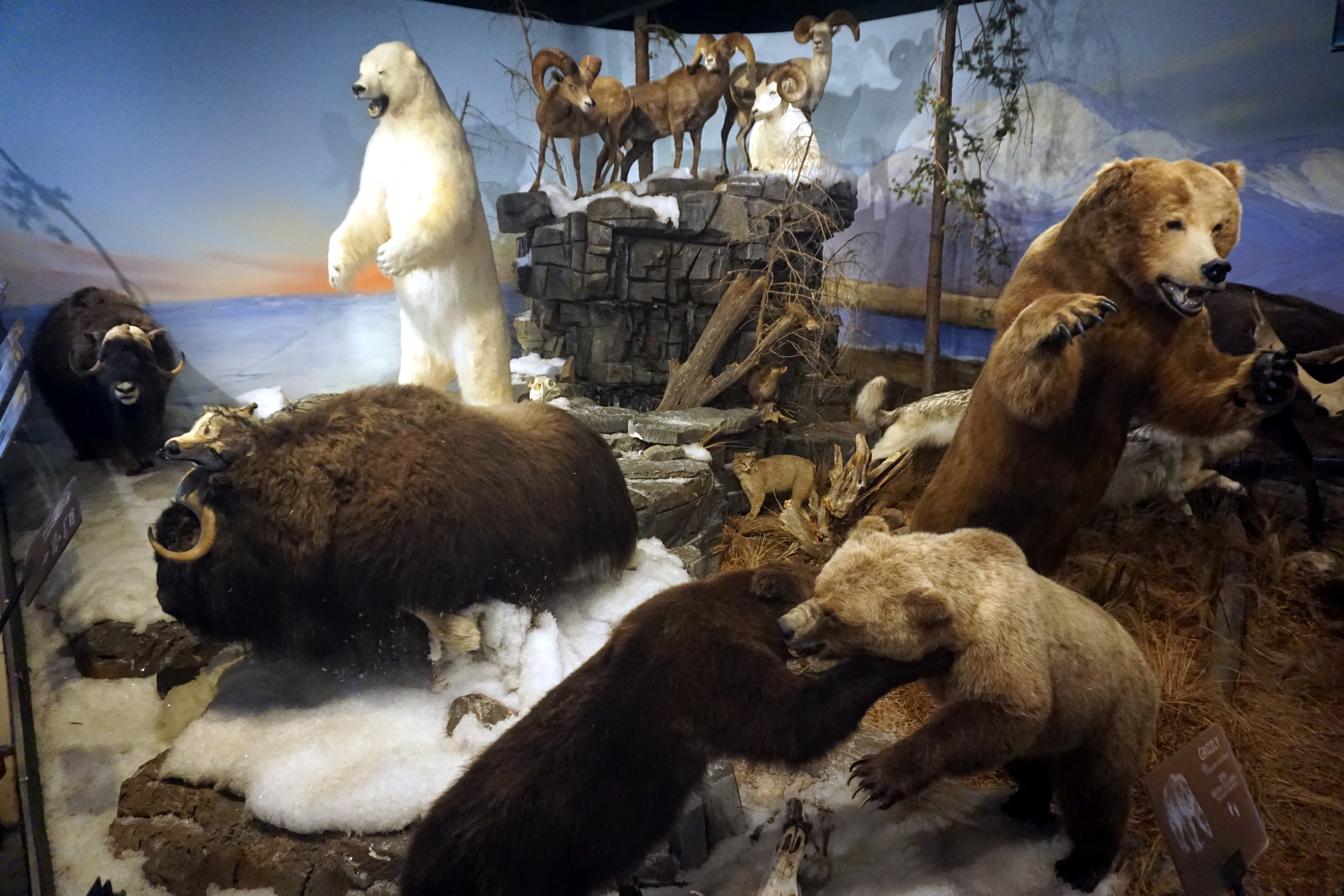
Richard Childress Wildlife and Conservation Gallery
