= Unrivaled: Earnhardt vs. Gordon =

- Poster
- Directed by: Michael Hughes
- Country of origin: United States
- Original language: English

Production
- Producers: Dave Bragg, Sol Horner, Jon Housholder, Jeff Schafer, Mike Thompson, Griffin Van Malssen
- Running time: 60 minutes
- Production companies: NASCAR Productions; DLP Media Group

Original release
- Release: February 14, 2019

Unrivaled: Earnhardt vs. Gordon is a 2019 documentary television film about the on-track rivalry and off-track relationship between NASCAR drivers Dale Earnhardt and Jeff Gordon.

== Cast ==
=== Interviewees ===
- Jeff Gordon, No. 24 driver, also executive producer
- Dale Earnhardt Jr., Earnhardt's son and NASCAR driver, also executive producer
- Rick Hendrick, No. 24 owner
- Ray Evernham, No. 24 crew chief
- Richard Childress, No. 3 owner
- Larry McReynolds, No. 3 crew chief from 1997 to 1998
- Jay Wells, Earnhardt's friend
- JR Rhodes, Earnhardt's PR director
- Don Hawk, Earnhardt's business manager
- Daniel Ricciardo, Earnhardt fan and Formula 1 driver
- Ricky Craven, Gordon's teammate and NASCAR driver
- John Bickford, Gordon's stepfather
- Carol Bickford, Gordon's mother
- Joe Garner, Gordon biographer
- Jerry Punch, ESPN broadcaster
- Ryan McGee, ESPN writer and reporter
- Marty Smith, ESPN writer and reporter
- Kyle Busch, Gordon fan and NASCAR driver
- Austin Dillon, Earnhardt fan and NASCAR driver
- Mike Helton, President of NASCAR
- Brian Williams, Earnhardt fan and NBC anchor
- Gavin Kilduff
- Chocolate Myers, No. 3 pit crew member
- Andy Petree, No. 3 crew chief from 1993 to 1995
- Chris Williams, Earnhardt's friend

=== Uncredited ===
- Dale Earnhardt, No. 3 driver (archive footage)
- Buck Baker (archive footage)
- Rusty Wallace (archive footage)

== Production ==
The scene where Gordon pays tribute to Earnhardt was filmed on location at Dale Earnhardt Plaza in Kannapolis, North Carolina.

== Release ==
In the United States, the documentary premiered on Fox Sports 1 on February 14, 2019, immediately after the running of the Gander RV Duels.

== Reception ==
In an interview with Fox Sports, Dale Earnhardt Jr. commented that the film told the story "just the way it was" and that he appreciated Gordon's tribute to his father: "It was real, you know? It was real."

According to Nielsen Media Research, Unrivaled earned 854,000 viewers during its premiere, making it FS1's most-watched original film debut.

== See also ==
- 3: The Dale Earnhardt Story (2004)
- Dale (2007)
- I Am Dale Earnhardt (2015)
- Earnhardt (2025)
