= Earnhardt =

Earnhardt may refer to:

== Earnhardt family ==
- The Earnhardt auto racing family:
  - Ralph Earnhardt (1928–1973), family patriarch
  - Dale Earnhardt Sr. (1951–2001), son of Ralph
  - Teresa Earnhardt (born 1958), owner and CEO of Dale Earnhardt, Inc., widow of Dale Sr. and stepmother of Kerry and Dale Jr.
  - Kerry Earnhardt (born 1969), Dale Sr.'s oldest son
  - Kelley Earnhardt Miller (born 1972), Dale Sr.'s oldest daughter
  - Dale Earnhardt Jr. (born 1974), the best-known and youngest of Dale Sr.'s sons
  - Bobby Dale Earnhardt (born 1987), oldest son of Kerry
  - Jeffrey Earnhardt (born 1989), youngest son of Kerry
  - Karsyn Elledge (born 2000), oldest daughter of Kelley
  - Wyatt Miller (born 2012), youngest son of Kelley

== Other people ==
- Tex Earnhardt (1930–2020), American entrepreneur

== Fictional characters ==
- Leon Earnhardt (b. 2001), fictional racer from the Future GPX Cyber Formula series
- Dr. Earnhardt, a fictional character from the 2012 video game Far Cry 3

== See also ==
- Dale Earnhardt, Inc. (DEI), a NASCAR racing team
  - Earnhardt Ganassi Racing, a NASCAR team and the result of a merger by DEI with Chip Ganassi Racing
- 3: The Dale Earnhardt Story, a 2004 TV movie
- Earnhardt (series), a 2025 television documentary series
- Earhart
- Earheart
