= Chocolate Myers =

NASCAR team principal; championship gasman

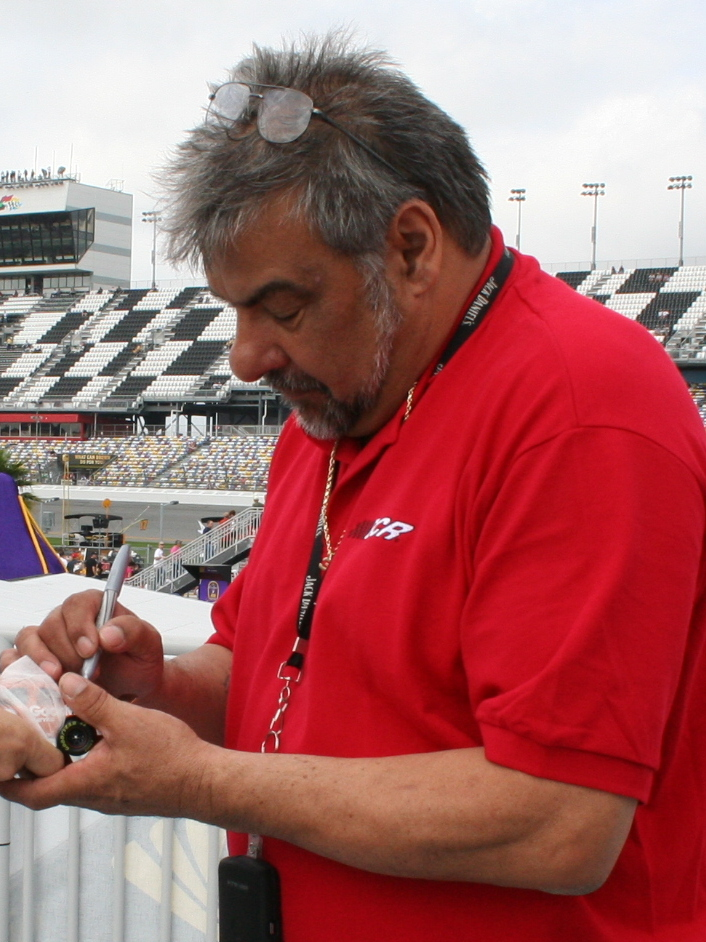
- Myers at Daytona International Speedway in 2009
- Born: Danny Myers; October 17, 1948 (age 77); Winston-Salem, North Carolina, U.S.
- Occupation: NASCAR personality

Danny "Chocolate" Myers (born October 17, 1948) is an American stock car racing personality. A long-time staffer for Richard Childress Racing, he was the fueler on six of the team's NASCAR championships (Dale Earnhardt Sr., 1986–87, 1990–91, 1993–94) and is the current curator of the team's museum. He is also a radio host on SiriusXM Satellite Radio.

== Racing career ==
Myers worked as the fueler for Richard Childress Racing's No. 3 and later No. 29 team from 1976 until 2002. He was part of the "Flying Aces" crew that was named the NASCAR pit crew of the year from 1985 until 1988. During the 20 years as an over-the-wall crew member, Myers and team owner Richard Childress visited victory lane 84 times, including the 1998 Daytona 500 win with driver Dale Earnhardt, Sr. Myers began his own "big time" racing career in 1968. That was the year he and Childress went to the Daytona 500 together the first time.

Earnhardt died in the 2001 Daytona 500 and the images of Myers' outburst three weeks later as the team scored its first win with new driver Kevin Harvick are regarded today as one of NASCAR's most emotional wins. Myers retired at the end of 2002; during the season he was part of the crew that was swapped from servicing Kevin Harvick to Robby Gordon's car.

One of the highlights of Myers' career was racing in Japan with his friends Richard Childress and Dale Earnhardt, Sr. in 1996. He also went to sign autographs for the troops in the War in Iraq. Myers is also on the Racers Speaking Circuit.

== Racing family ==
Myers is a native of Winston-Salem, North Carolina. He is the eldest son of Lorene Yountz Myers and NASCAR racer Bobby Myers, who was known as the "Master of the Madhouse" for his racing exploits at the legendary Bowman Gray Stadium. Myers died in an accident at the 1957 Southern 500 while driving for Richard Petty's father Lee Petty.

Every year, NASCAR bestows the prestigious Myers Brothers Award to the person, corporation, or entity that has had the greatest positive impact on the sport of stock car racing that year. The Myers Brothers Award was named for Bobby and Billy Myers, Chocolate's father and uncle. Chocolate is married to Caron (Pappas) Myers, a television/radio broadcaster. Caron Myers has worked as a racing reporter on several TV shows and as a reporter for FOX 8/WGHP television in High Point, North Carolina. Caron has reported for WFDD, Wake Forest Demon Deacons and WTOB. She also writes occasionally for Our State Magazine. The couple has an adult daughter Alexi, who is married to Seth Miller. The couple also has a son named Greyson and a daughter named Tatum. Chocolate and Caron have homes in Lexington, NC and Ocean Isle Beach, NC.

Myers remains with RCR as the curator of the RCR Museum in Welcome, North Carolina and a host on SiriusXM Channel 90, the NASCAR Channel.

In 2024, Myers received the Order of the Long Leaf Pine, one of the highest honors granted by the Governor of North Carolina for distinguished service to the state.

== Actor ==
Myers also co-hosts a radio show, Tradin' Paint, on Sirius Satellite Radio. He has done color-commentating on ESPN2, appeared in countless television commercials, and acted in movies, including the "Smokey and the Bandit" series. He has also appeared on several episodes of QVC.

== Honors ==
Myers was inducted into the Legends of NASCAR Hall of Fame in 2006. He and his wife Caron are featured in a chapter of Peter Golenbock's book "The Last Lap". Chocolate received North Carolina’s highest civilian award with The Order of the Longleaf Pine in 2024. https://longleafpinesociety.org/
