= Earhart Foundation =

American charitable foundation (1929–2016)

The Earhart Foundation was an American conservative private charitable foundation that funded research and scholarship since its founding in 1929 by oil executive Harry Boyd Earhart. Richard Ware served as the Foundation's longtime president.

== History ==
The Philanthropy Roundtable said of the Earhart Foundation in 2004, "For 75 years, the Earhart Foundation has epitomized achievement in the humanities and social sciences. ... Harry B. Earhart started the foundation in 1929 with the fortune he made with White Star Oil Company." Among his foundation's early beneficiaries was well-known economist and philosopher, Friedrich von Hayek. Hayek penned the broadly read book, The Road to Serfdom and The Constitution of Liberty and taught at the London School of Economics.

Nine winners of the Nobel Prize in economics came from the ranks of Earhart Foundation Fellows. Other Nobel-winning economists who benefited from Earhart funding include Milton Friedman, Gary Becker, James M. Buchanan, Ronald Coase, Robert Lucas, Daniel McFadden, Vernon L. Smith, and George Stigler.

The Foundation sought to identify talent that reflects the mission of the Foundation: to support free-market scholars through a network of "Earhart professors" across the United States:Earhart Foundation: "A Guide to the H.B. Earhart Fellowship Program 1952-2015"

We find promising young men and women that we think would be ideal, not only from an intellectual but also from a character point of view, to be teachers and academic leaders in the future. And when we so identify them, we recommend them to the Earhart Foundation. They provide grants, and we continue to mentor these students as they go through graduate school.

In the 1980s the organisation funded the conservative American Enterprise Institute. It also funded the now defunct George C. Marshall Institute.

Since 1995, the Earhart Foundation has been engaged in the pursuit of publishing the collected works of Eric Voegelin. Between 1995 and 2002, the Earhart Foundation issued at least twelve grants totaling at least $115,000 "for (a) research assistance and (b) general operating support to continue preparation for publication of The Collected Works of Eric Voegelin."

In 2000, the Earhart Foundation reported total assets of $95 million (2000 IRS Form 990).

Funding from the Earhart Foundation has also helped promoters of Neo-Confederacy: between 1995 and 2005 the foundation awarded $10,000 to Clyde Wilson, $8,000 to Thomas Woods, $14,000 to Mark Royden Winchell, director of the League of the South, and $20,000 and $98,000, respectively, to League of the South–affiliated scholars Thomas DiLorenzo and James McClellan.

In 2015, the Earhart Foundation published a guide to the H. B. Earhart Fellowship Program listing the Foundation's trustees, officers, and members, as well as fellowship sponsors and grantees during the program's existence from 1952 to 2015.

Also in 2015, The Governing board decided to sunset the Earhart Foundation, and funds were dispersed by 2016.

== See also ==
- Category:Fellows of the Earhart Foundation
