= Walter Stuart Diehl =

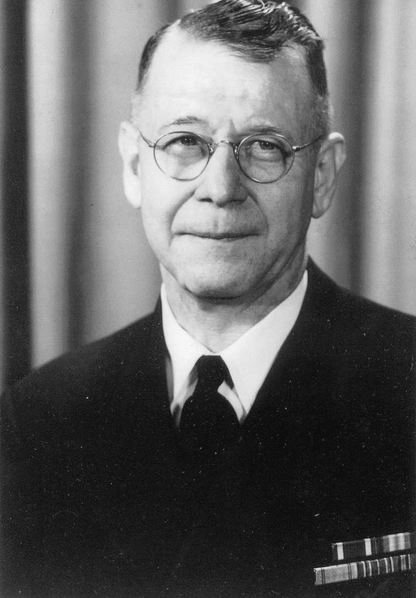
- Born: 3 December 1893; Jonesborough, Tennessee, US
- Died: 21 November 1976 (aged 82); Washington, D.C., US
- Resting place: Arlington National Cemetery
- Occupation(s): Naval officer, aeronautical engineer
- Years active: 1918-1951

Walter Stuart Diehl (3 December 1893 – 21 November 1976) was an American naval officer and aeronautical engineer.

== Early life ==
Diehl was born in Jonesborough, Tennessee, on 3 December 1893, as the oldest child of Wiliam P. and Lydia Showalter Diehl. He lived in Jonesborough until he served in the United States Navy during World War I, in which the United States participated from 6 April 1917 to 11 November 1918.

== Personal life ==
Diehl married Zulime Summers in 1923 in Washington, D.C. They had two children, Zulime Whitney Diehl, born 19 April 1925, and Walter Colburn Diehl, born 22 February 1930. Zulime Whitney Diehl died in 1956.

== Career ==
Diehl was a pioneer of aerodynamics and aircraft design. Serving in the U.S. Navy's Bureau of Aeronautics, he directed the Navy's work in aerodynamics and hydrodynamics from 1918 until 1951. He was responsible for the funding, programs, and facilities of the Aerodynamics Laboratory. The author of the authoritative Engineering Aerodynamics, he actively participated in and strongly influenced continuing advances in aerodynamics and hydrodynamics.

Diehl initiated action that led to establishment of the David W. Taylor Model Basin at Carderock, Maryland, the Aircraft Research Station at Chincoteague, Virginia, and the U.S. Navy's test flight unit at Naval Air Station Anacostia in Washington, D.C., which later developed into the Naval Air Test Center at Naval Air Station Patuxent River, Maryland.

== Retirement and death ==
Diehl retired from the Navy in 1951 as a captain. He died in Washington, D.C., on 21 November 1976.

He is buried at Arlington National Cemetery in Arlington, Virginia.

== Commemoration ==
A U.S. Navy fleet replenishment oiler, USNS Walter S. Diehl (T-AO-193), was named for Diehl. She was christened in his honor in New Orleans, Louisiana, on 10 October 1987 and entered non-commissioned service as a United States Naval Ship with the Military Sealift Command on 13 September 1988. She was placed in reserve in 2022.
