= Earhart Environmental Magnet Elementary School =

Location
- 4401 North Arkansas Avenue; Wichita, Kansas 67204; United States
- Coordinates: 37°45′50″N 97°20′52″W

Information
- Type: Public, Elementary School, Grades K-5
- Motto: Earhart "grows" neat kids!
- Established: Before 1952
- Enrollment: 399 (2016-17)
- Website: Official site

Earhart Environmental Magnet Elementary School is a public elementary school in Wichita, Kansas named after native Kansas aviator Amelia Earhart. A magnet school situated on a 10-acre (40,000 m^{2}) site, it augments the District curriculum with an environmental focus.

== Environmental education ==
Although the school has a standard curriculum, a lot of resources at the school are aimed at improving environmental awareness through the addition of numerous 'environmental' courses. These include looking at ecosystems including oceans, deserts, and grasslands. The school also uses field trips and outdoor experiences to enhance the environmental aspects of their courses. This includes lab studies, field trips and camping trips. The school also teaches the students recycling through a comprehensive recycling program. The school is also an OWLS (Outdoor Wildlife Learning Site) and is part of the Wildlife Habitat Incentive Program.

== Awards ==
During the 1989–90 school year, Earhart Environmental Magnet Elementary School was recognized with the Blue Ribbon School Award of Excellence by the United States Department of Education, the highest award an American school can receive.

The school has also received awards from local government including in 2000, the Quality Performance Accreditation, the State award for excellence in Maths and Science and in 2004 the Improving learning through technology award (which included a grant). Environmentally, the school received the Great Plains Earth Institute "Earth Stewardship Award" in 2004.
