= Dale (film) =

2007 film

- DVD cover
- Directed by: Rory Karpf; Mike Viney
- Written by: Ryan McGee
- Produced by: Jeff Hillegass
- Starring: Dale Earnhardt
- Narrated by: Paul Newman
- Distributed by: CMT Films
- Release date: February 2007
- Running time: 100 minutes
- Country: United States
- Language: English

Dale is a 2007 documentary film about the life and career of NASCAR race car driver Dale Earnhardt. The film follows his career all the way to his death in the 2001 Daytona 500. Produced as a collaboration between CMT Films and NASCAR Images, the film premiered in theaters in selected cities in February 2007. A lot of the cities the film premiered in were cities where the NASCAR Sprint Cup Series was racing that week including Daytona Beach. Dale made its television debut on CMT on September 4, 2007, setting a new high record in terms of ratings for the network of more than 3.1 million total viewers. The film included interviews from legendary NASCAR drivers including Dale's rival Darrell Waltrip. The film is now available on DVD as a 6-disc set. Narrated by Paul Newman, it was one of his last films and the final one to air in his lifetime.

== See also ==
- 3: The Dale Earnhardt Story (2004)
- I Am Dale Earnhardt (2015)
- Unrivaled: Earnhardt vs. Gordon (2019)
- Earnhardt (2025)
