= USNS Walter S. Diehl =

Oiler of the United States Navy

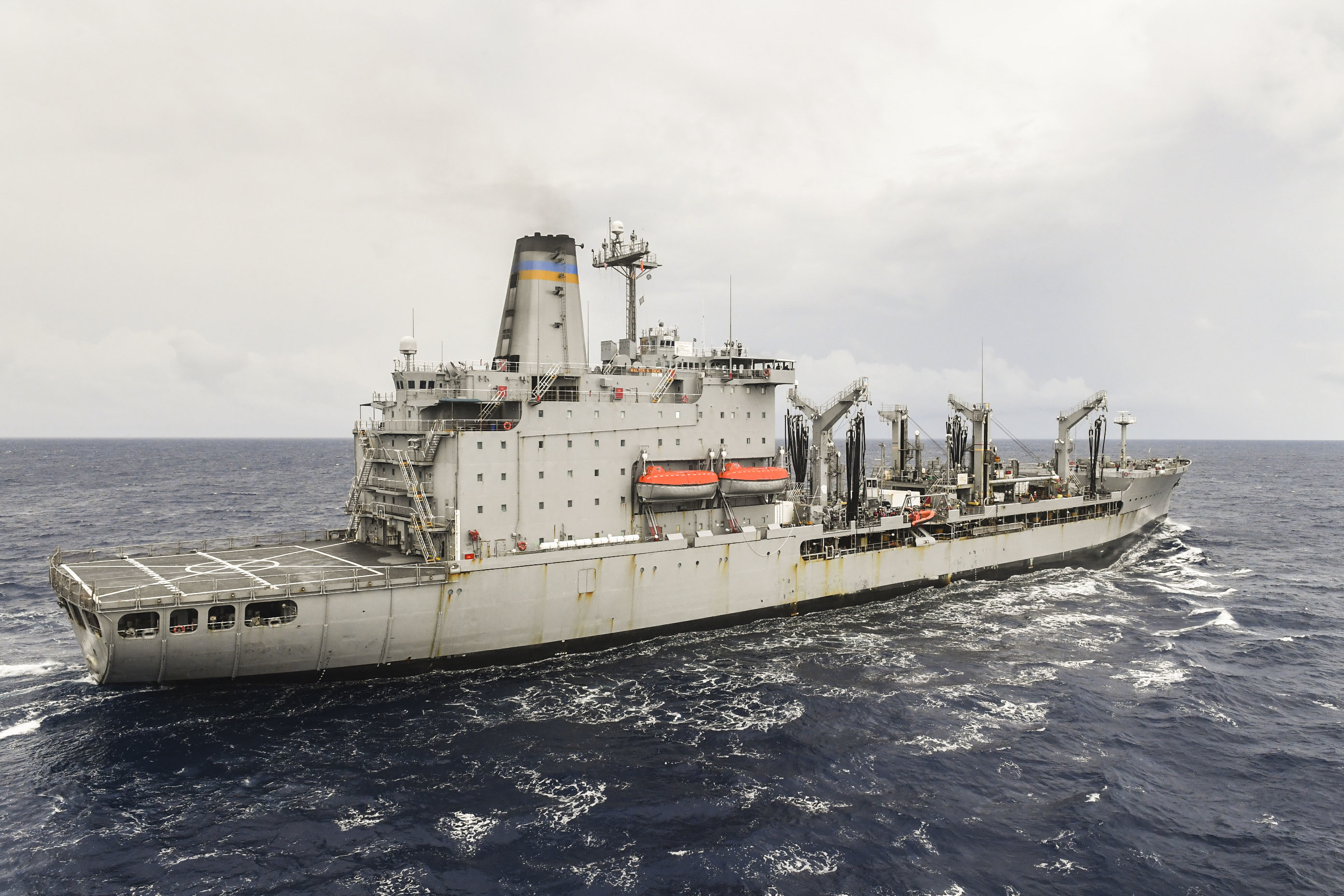
- USNS Walter S. Diehl (T-AO-193) in 2019

History

United States
- Name: USNS Walter S. Diehl
- Namesake: Walter Stuart Diehl (1893–1976), a U.S. Navy officer and American pioneer of aerodynamics and aircraft design
- Ordered: 28 June 1985
- Builder: Avondale Shipyard, Inc., New Orleans, Louisiana
- Laid down: 7 August 1986
- Launched: 2 October 1987
- Christened: 10 October 1987
- In service: 13 September 1988
- Out of service: 1 October 2022
- Identification: Callsign: NWSD
- Fate: Scrapped

General characteristics
- Class & type: Henry J. Kaiser-class replenishment oiler
- Type: Fleet replenishment oiler
- Tonnage: 31,200 deadweight tons
- Displacement: 9,500 tons light; Full load variously reported as 42,382 tons and 40,700 long tons (41,353 metric tons)
- Length: 677 ft (206 m)
- Beam: 97 ft 5 in (29.69 m)
- Draft: 35 ft (11 m) maximum
- Installed power: 16,000 hp (11.9 MW) per shaft; 34,442 hp (25.7 MW) total sustained
- Propulsion: Two medium-speed Colt-Pielstick PC4-2/2 10V-570 diesel engines, two shafts, controllable-pitch propellers
- Speed: 20 knots (37 km/h; 23 mph)
- Capacity: 178,000 to 180,000 barrels (29,000 m^{3}) of fuel oil and jet fuel; 7,400 square feet (690 m^{2}) dry cargo space; eight 20-foot (6.1 m) refrigerated containers with room for 128 pallets
- Complement: 103 (18 civilian officers, 1 U.S. Navy officer, 64 merchant seamen, 20 U.S. Navy enlisted personnel)
- Armament: Peacetime: .30 cal GPMG & .50 cal heavy machine guns; Wartime: ×1 (or more) 20-mm Phalanx CIWS
- Aircraft carried: None
- Aviation facilities: Helicopter landing platform
- Notes: Five refueling stations; Two dry cargo transfer rigs

USNS Walter S. Diehl (T-AO-193) was a Henry J. Kaiser-class replenishment oiler of the United States Navy. She was named after Captain Walter Stuart Diehl, USN, a career naval officer and aeronautical engineer.

== Design ==
The Henry J. Kaiser-class replenishment oilers were preceded by the shorter Cimarron-class fleet replenishment oilers. Walter S. Diehl has an overall length of 206.5 metres (677 ft 6 in) and a beam of 29.7 metres (97 ft), with a draft of 11 metres (36 ft). The oiler has a displacement of 41,353 tonnes (40,700 long tons; 45,584 short tons) at full load. It has a capacity of 180,000 imperial barrels (29,000,000 L; 6,500,000 imp gal; 7,800,000 US gal) of aviation fuel or fuel oil. She can carry a dry load of 690 square metres (7,400 sq ft) and can refrigerate 128 pallets of food. The ship is powered by two 10 PC4.2 V 570 Colt-Pielstick diesel engines that drive two shafts; this gives a power of 25.6 megawatts (34,800 PS; 34,300 shp).

The Henry J. Kaiser-class oilers have maximum speeds of 20 knots (37 km/h; 23 mph). They were initially built without armaments, but are equipped with small arms and can be fitted with close-in weapon systems if required. The ship has a helicopter platform but not any maintenance facilities. Walter S. Diehl is fitted with five fuelling stations; these can fill two ships at the same time and the ship is capable of pumping 900,000 US gallons (3,400,000 L; 750,000 imp gal) of diesel or 540,000 US gallons (2,000,000 L; 450,000 imp gal) of jet fuel per hour. She has a complement of 89 civilians (nineteen officers), 29 spare crew, and 6 United States Navy crew.

== Construction and delivery ==
Walter S. Diehl, the seventh ship of the Henry J. Kaiser-class, was laid down at Avondale Shipyard, Inc., at New Orleans, Louisiana, on 7 August 1986 and launched on 2 October 1987. She entered non-commissioned U.S. Navy service under the control of the Military Sealift Command with a primarily civilian crew on 13 September 1988.

== Service history ==
Walter S. Diehl was assigned to the United States Pacific Fleet, serving in the Pacific Ocean, Indian Ocean, and Persian Gulf regions.

On 23 April 2008, Walter S. Diehl was passing through the Strait of Hormuz when six small motorboats sped alongside in an aggressive and threatening manner. Walter S. Diehl fired flares to warn the boats off, but they did not move away. She then opened fire with a .50-caliber (12.7-mm) machine gun and the boats sped off.

On 20 November 2014, Walter S. Diehl collided with the USNS Amelia Earhart (T-AKE-6) during an underway replenishment operation. No injuries were reported.

She was taken out of service and placed in reserve on 1 October 2022.

== Fate ==
On December 24, 2024, Walter S. Diehl was towed to Brownsville, Texas for scrapping.
