= Harry Boyd Earhart =

American business executive and philanthropist

- Born: 1870
- Died: 1954
- Occupation(s): Oilman, philanthropist

Harry Boyd Earhart (1870–1954) was an American business executive and philanthropist.

== Biography ==
=== Early life ===
Harry Boyd Earhart was born in 1870.

=== Career ===
He bought the struggling Buffalo, New York-based White Star Refining Company in 1911, and moved it to Michigan, just as the car industry was beginning to develop there. White Star developed a chain of gas stations and had its own refinery, and was eventually acquired by the Vacuum Oil Company in 1930, which later became Mobil.

=== Philanthropist ===
He founded the Earhart Foundation, which has identified talented and influential scholars such as Friedrich A. Hayek and Milton Friedman. Nine winners of the Nobel Prize in economics were Earhart Foundation fellows earlier in their careers. Other Nobel-winning economists who benefited from Earhart funding include Gary Becker, James M. Buchanan, Ronald Coase, Robert Lucas, Daniel McFadden, Vernon L. Smith, and George Stigler.

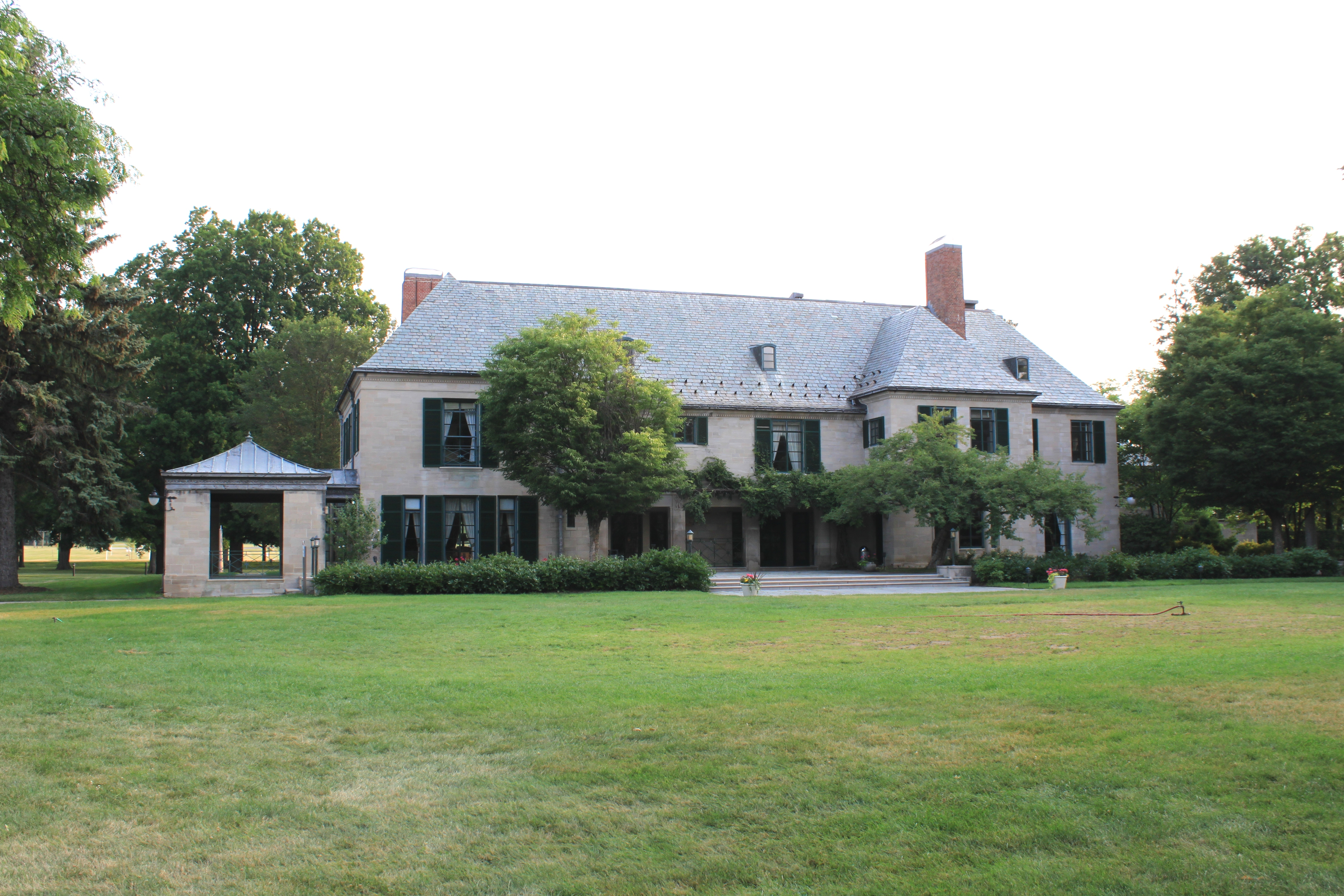
Earhart Manor in Ann Arbor, Michigan

=== Death ===
He died in 1954.

== Legacy ==
After his death, Earhart's land and mansion in Ann Arbor, Michigan became part of Concordia University, Ann Arbor, Michigan in 1963.
