= I Am Dale Earnhardt =

- Release poster
- Directed by: Jeff Cvitkovic
- Starring: Jack Arute; Doc Brooks; Kix Brooks; Richard Childress; Dale Earnhardt Jr.; Jeff Gordon; Jimmie Johnson; Morgan Spurlock
- Country of origin: United States
- Original language: English

Production
- Producer: Jason Allison
- Editors: Dave Bragg; Scott Dowless; John Schroter
- Running time: 94 minutes
- Production companies: NASCAR Productions; Got Films

Original release
- Release: March 2, 2015

I Am Dale Earnhardt is a 2015 documentary TV film created by NASCAR Productions and Spike TV, that takes an in-depth look into the life and death of Dale Earnhardt. It is part of a series of I AM documentaries that air on Spike TV.

== Content ==
The film features interviews from several NASCAR drivers or former drivers including Earnhardt's son Dale Earnhardt Jr., as well as Jeff Gordon, Jimmie Johnson, Darrell Waltrip, Rusty Wallace and more. It also features classic footage from Earnhardt Sr.'s career.

== See also ==
- 3: The Dale Earnhardt Story (2004)
- Dale (2007)
- Unrivaled: Earnhardt vs. Gordon (2019)
- Earnhardt (2025)
