= USNS Amelia Earhart =

Cargo ship of the United States Navy

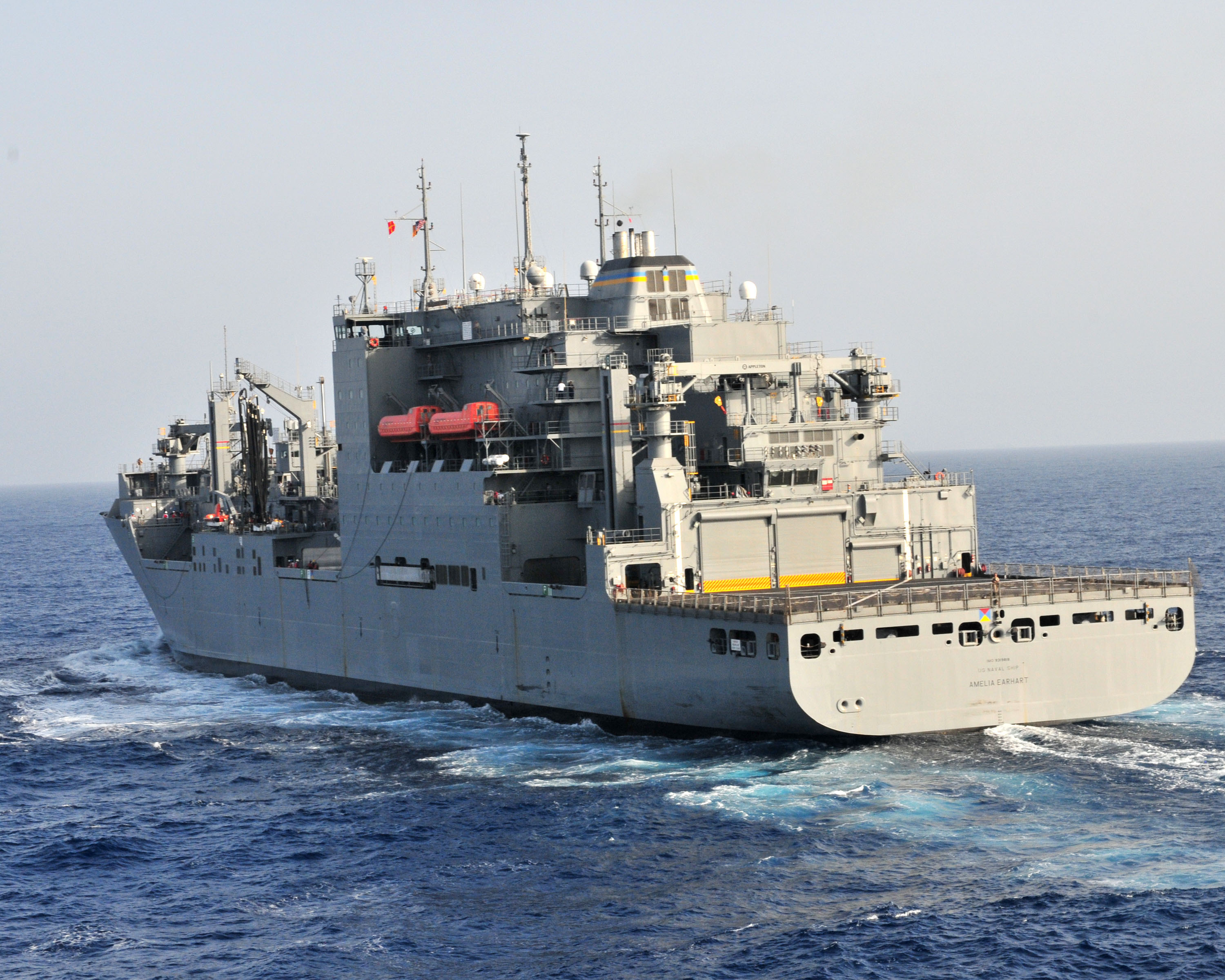
- USNS Amelia Earhart

History
- Name: Amelia Earhart
- Namesake: Amelia Earhart
- Awarded: 27 January 2004
- Builder: National Steel and Shipbuilding Company
- Laid down: 30 May 2007
- Launched: 6 April 2008
- Sponsored by: Amy Kleppner
- In service: 30 October 2008
- Identification: IMO number: 9319818; MMSI number: 369894000; Callsign: NEAR
- Motto: Esprit Intrepide ("Intrepid Spirit")
- Status: in active service
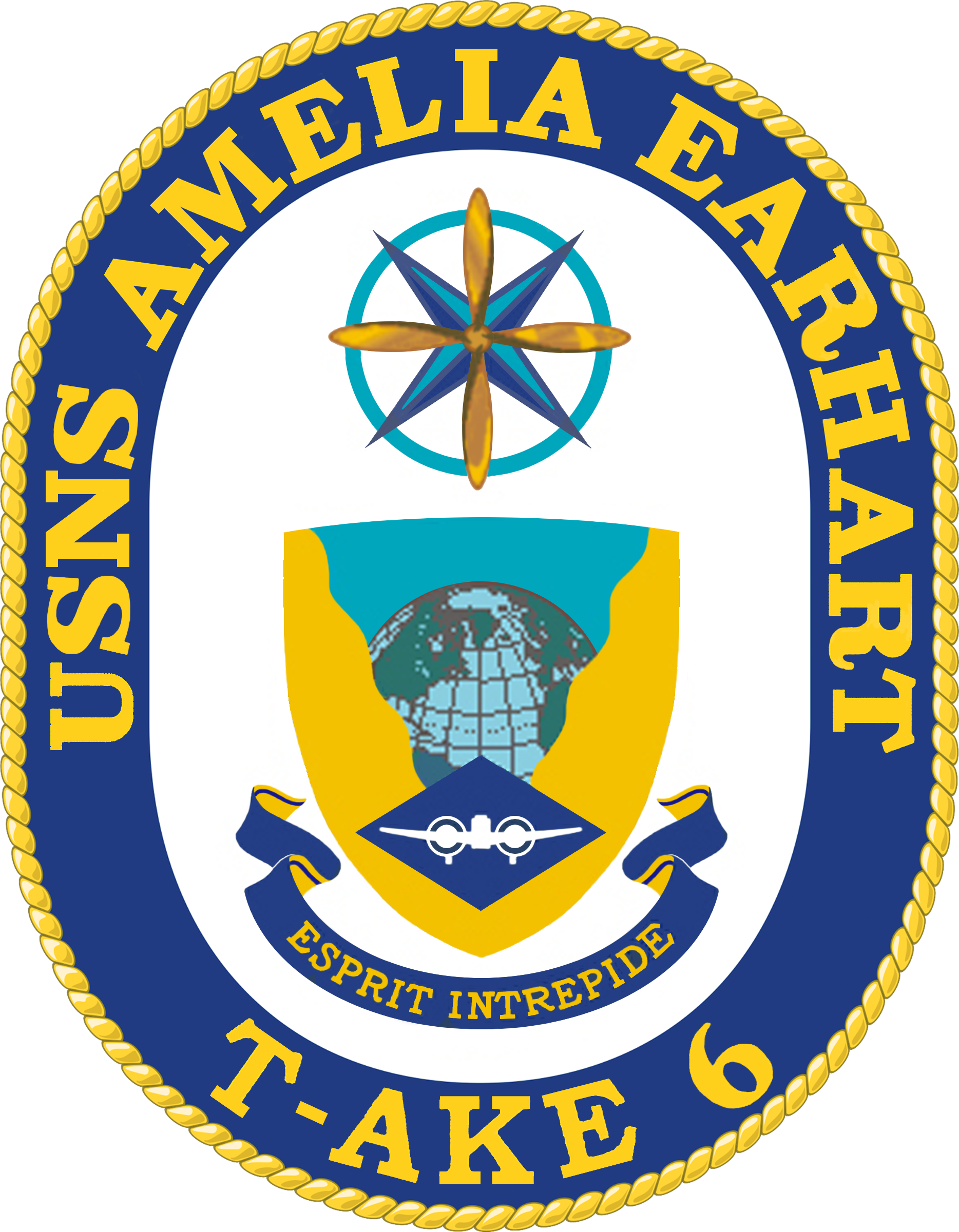
- Badge

General characteristics
- Class & type: Lewis and Clark-class cargo ship
- Displacement: 23,852 tons light, 40,298 tons full, 16,446 tons dead
- Length: 210 m (689 ft) overall, 199.3 m (654 ft) waterline
- Beam: 32.3 m (106 ft) extreme, 32.3 m (106 ft) waterline
- Draft: 9.1 m (30 ft) maximum, 9.4 m (31 ft) limit
- Propulsion: Integrated propulsion and ship service electrical system, with generation at 6.6 kV by FM/MAN B&W diesel generators; one fixed pitch propeller; bow thruster
- Speed: 20 knots (37 km/h)
- Range: 14,000 nautical miles at 20 kt; (26,000 km at 37 km/h)
- Capacity: Max dry cargo weight: 5,910 long tons (6,000 t); Max dry cargo volume: 783,000 cubic feet (22,200 m^{3}); Max cargo fuel weight: 2,350 long tons (2,390 t); Cargo fuel volume: 18,000 barrels (2,900 m³); (DFM: 10,500) (JP5:7,500)
- Complement: 49 military, 123 civilian
- Electronic warfare & decoys: Nulka decoy launchers
- Armament: 2–6 × 0.5 in (12.7 mm) machine guns; or 7.62 mm medium machine guns
- Aircraft carried: two helicopters, either Sikorsky MH-60S Knighthawk or Aerospatiale Puma

USNS Amelia Earhart (T-AKE-6), a Lewis and Clark-class dry cargo ship is the only ship of the United States Navy to be named for noted American aviation pioneer and women's rights advocate Amelia Earhart (1897–1937). The contract to build the ship was awarded to National Steel and Shipbuilding Company (NASSCO) of San Diego, California, on 27 January 2004. Her keel was laid down at the end of May 2007 at General Dynamics' NASSCO shipyard. In early 2007, Alex Mandel along with members of the Amelia Earhart Society (AES) and Amelia Earhart Research Association (AERA) successfully petitioned the naming of the ship.

On 26 July 2007 one of the ship's four 200-ton diesel-electric engines toppled from a truck delivering it to the shipyard in the 2700 block of Harbor Drive, San Diego. The engine damaged three vehicles, completely flattening one. A woman sleeping in the back of a van whose front-end was destroyed suffered minor injuries. The accident also created an 8-foot-deep (2.4 m) sink-hole in the roadway and ruptured a water main. The accident is believed to have been caused when the truck accidentally delivered the engine to the wrong gate of the shipyard and hit the curb while backing up in an attempt to turn around. The engine was recovered on 29 July by three heavy cranes.

At 9 p.m. 6 April 2008, a ceremony was held to christen the Amelia Earhart, with the honors of breaking the traditional bottle of champagne given to Amelia Earhart's closest living relative, niece Amy Kleppner. Ms. Kleppner is also sister-in-law of physicist Daniel Kleppner, whose wife Beatrice and daughter Sofie participated as Matrons of Honor. The new ship is designed to deliver ammunition, food, fuel and other dry cargo to US and allied warships at sea. It will be crewed by 124 civil service mariners and, at times, will include an additional complement of naval personnel and carry two helicopters.

On 20 November 2014 the Amelia Earhart collided with the USNS Walter S. Diehl in the Gulf of Aden.

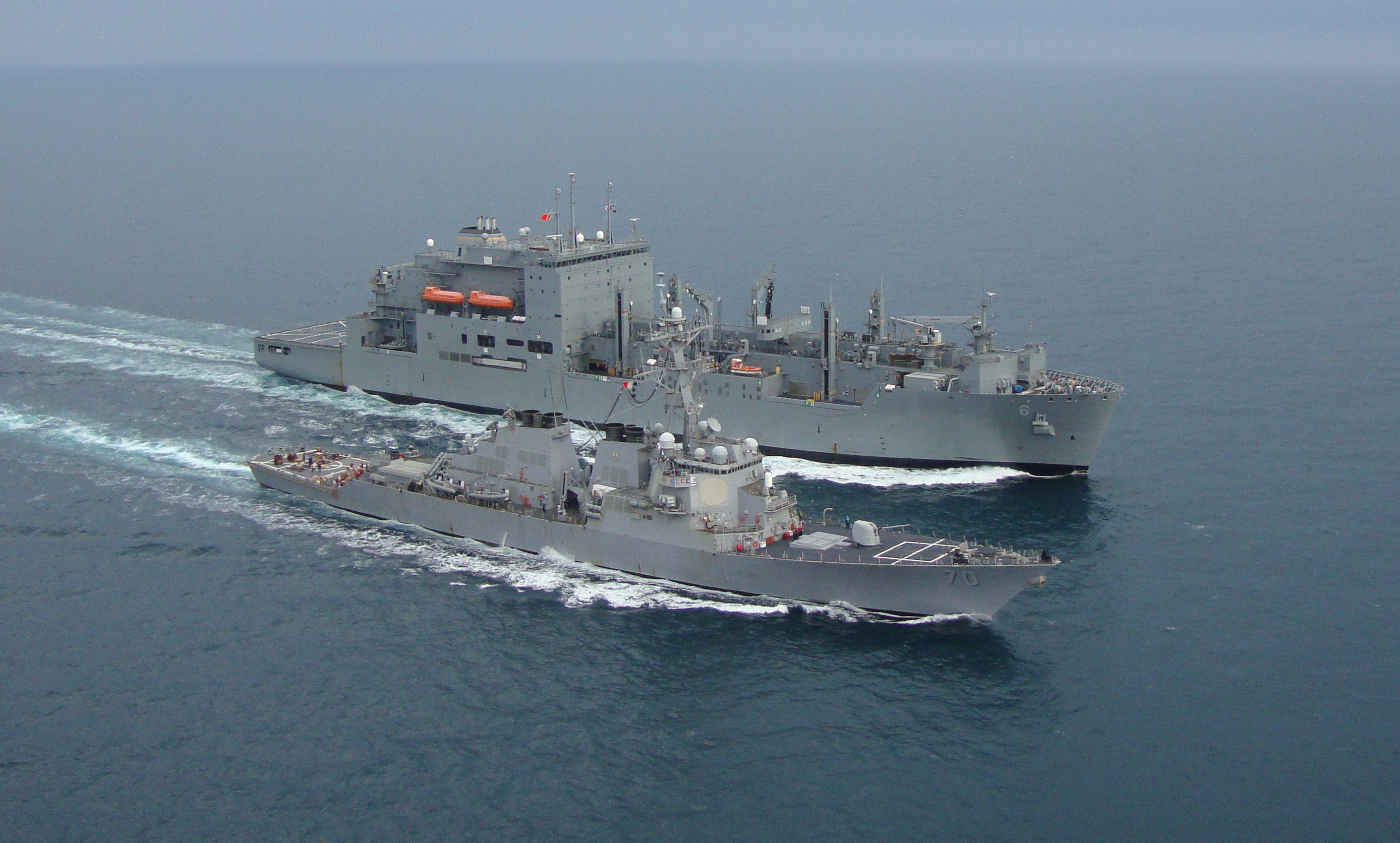
Amelia Earhart conducting underway replenishment with USS Hopper (DDG-70), November 2009

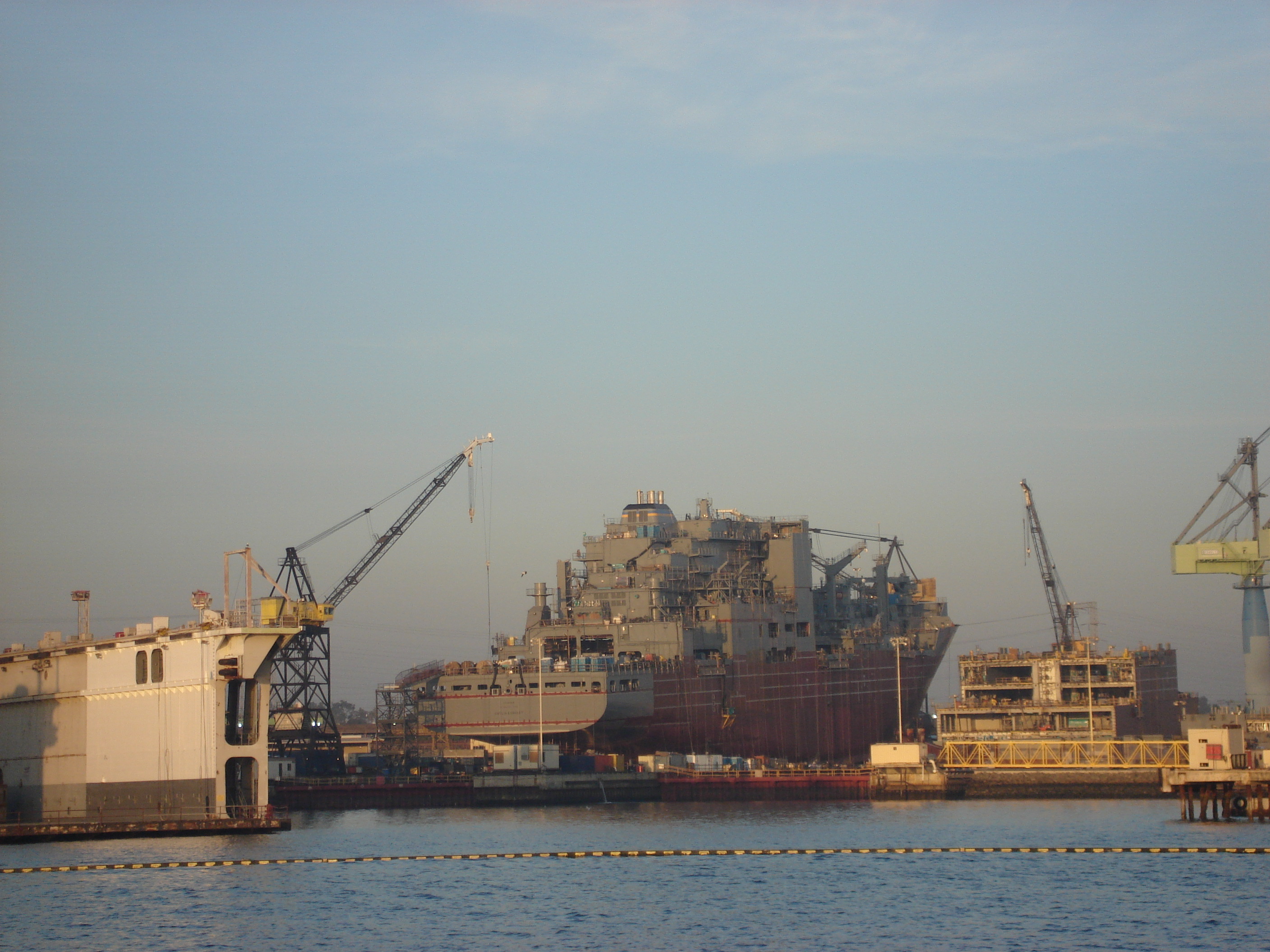
Amelia Earhart under construction, January 2008

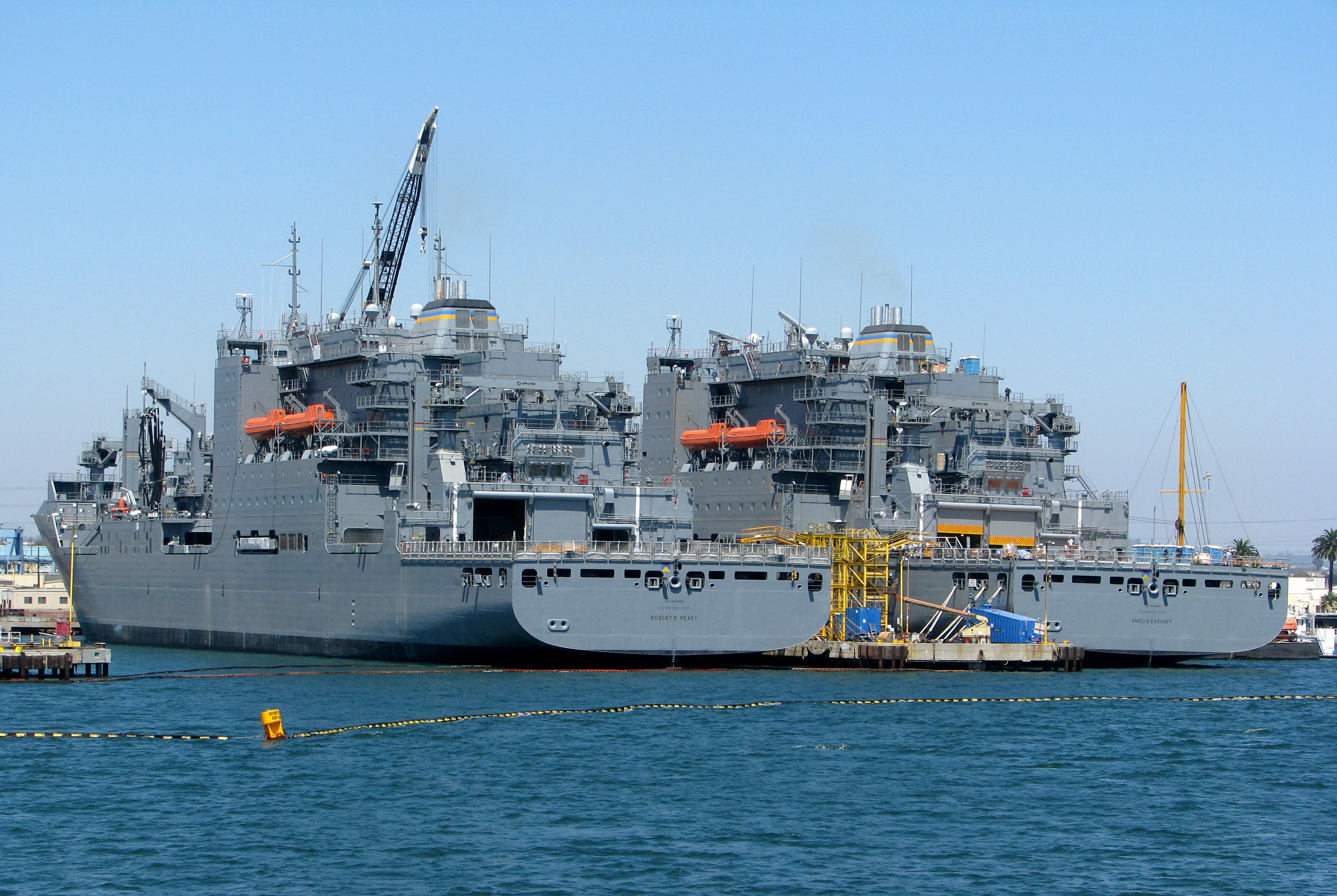
USNS Amelia Earhart (T-AKE-6) dockside beside USNS Robert E. Peary (T-AKE-5)
