= USS Earheart =

Crosley-class high-speed transport ship

History

United States
- Name: USS Earheart (DE-603)
- Namesake: James E. Earheart, Jr.
- Builder: Bethlehem-Hingham Shipyard, Inc., Hingham, Massachusetts
- Laid down: 20 March 1945
- Reclassified: APD-113, while under construction
- Launched: 12 May 1945
- Sponsored by: Mrs. James Earheart
- Commissioned: 26 July 1945
- Decommissioned: 29 April 1946
- Stricken: 12 December 1963
- Fate: Transferred to Mexican Navy, 12 December 1963

Mexico
- Name: ARM Papaloapan (H04)
- Namesake: Papaloapan River
- Reclassified: B04
- Fate: ran aground, 1976
- Stricken: 1976

General characteristics
- Class & type: Rudderow-class destroyer escort, as ordered
- Class & type: Crosley-class high speed transport, as completed
- Displacement: 2,130 long tons (2,164 t) full
- Length: 306 ft (93 m)
- Beam: 37 ft (11 m)
- Draft: 12 ft 7 in (3.84 m)
- Speed: 23 knots (43 km/h; 26 mph)
- Troops: 162
- Complement: 204
- Armament: 1 × 5 in (130 mm) gun; 6 × 40 mm guns; 6 × 20 mm guns; 2 × depth charge tracks

USS Earheart (APD-113), ex-DE-603, was a United States Navy high-speed transport in commission from 1945 to 1946.

== Namesake ==
James Edward Earheart Jr. was born in Cincinnati, Ohio, on 25 April 1913 and was of German descent. He enlisted in the United States Marine Corps on 7 January 1942. During Operation Torch, the Allied amphibious landings in North Africa, on 8 November 1942, Private First Class Earheart was a member of a naval antisabotage party embarked in a British warship which was damaged during the entry into Oran, Algeria. Heroically, he volunteered, in the face of continuous Vichy French shelling, to swim to a harbor tug whose movements were endangering the men abandoning the warship. He was killed in this effort. Earheart was posthumously awarded the Silver Star for his actions at Oran.

== Construction and commissioning ==
Earheart was laid down as the Rudderow-class destroyer escort USS Earheart (DE-603) on 20 March 1945 by Bethlehem-Hingham Shipyard, Inc., at Hingham, Massachusetts. She was reclassified as a Crosley-class high-speed transport and redesignated APD-113 during construction, and was launched on 12 May 1945, sponsored by Mrs. James Earheart, mother of the ship's namesake, Private First Class James E. Earheart Jr. Earheart was commissioned on 26 July 1945.

== Service history ==
Earheart conducted shakedown training at Guantanamo Bay, Cuba, during which World War II ended with the surrender of Japan on 15 August 1945. She then moved to Providence, Rhode Island, to celebrate Navy Day on 27 October 1945. Earheart then moved on to Green Cove Springs, Florida, for inactivation.

== Decommissioning and disposal ==
Earheart was decommissioned at Green Cove Springs on 29 April 1946 and berthed there with the Florida Group of the Atlantic Reserve Fleet in the St. Johns River. She was stricken from the Navy List on 12 December 1963.

== Mexican Navy service ==
Earheart was transferred to Mexico on 12 December 1963. In Mexican Navy service she was named ARM Papaloapan (H04) after the Papaloapan River. She was later assigned the new pennant number of B04. Papaloapan ran aground in 1976 and was discarded by the Mexican Navy and scrapped that year.
