= Earnhardt (series) =

American documentary television miniseries

- Release poster
- Genre: Miniseries
- Directed by: Joshua Altman
- Opening theme: "Ride Away" by Roy Orbison
- Ending theme: "Hands on the Wheel" by Willie Nelson
- Country of origin: United States
- Original language: English
- No. of seasons: 1
- No. of episodes: 4

Production
- Executive producer: Ron Howard
- Cinematography: Michael Latham
- Editor: LaRue Anderson
- Running time: 58 minutes-1 hour and 11 minutes
- Production companies: Imagine Entertainment; Everyone Else; NASCAR Studios; Dirty Mo Media

Original release
- Network: Amazon Prime Video
- Release: May 22 – May 29, 2025

Earnhardt is a 2025 sports television documentary miniseries produced in collaboration between Amazon Prime Video and NASCAR to give a behind-the-scenes look at Dale Earnhardt's life and career, from his rookie season in 1979 to his death in 2001.

Earnhardt premiered on Amazon Prime Video on May 22, 2025, with the first two episodes released that day and the remaining two episodes released on May 29. The four-part miniseries was produced by Imagine Entertainment, in association with NASCAR Studios and Dirty Mo Media, and directed by Joshua Altman. Featuring archival footage of Earnhardt himself, interviews with his children, colleagues, rivals, and close friends, the series explores Earnhardt's rise to the top of NASCAR, his seven Cup Series championships, and the complicated family relationships he endured in his lifetime.

The series received positive reviews from critics, with praise for its emotional depth, production quality, and portrayal of Earnhardt's life beyond just the racetrack. Critics highlighted its ability to explore the costs of his racing career, offering a more vulnerable picture of the drivers famously intimidating and tough image.

However, the series also presents a very complicated portrait of Earnhardt. The series examines the tensions of his early racing ambitions, his public image, and his relationships with his children. Rather than focusing solely on his accomplishments and legacy as a seven-time champion, the documentary explores the emotional distance within his family and the challenges of growing up in the shadow of one of motorsport's most recognizable figures.

== Synopsis ==
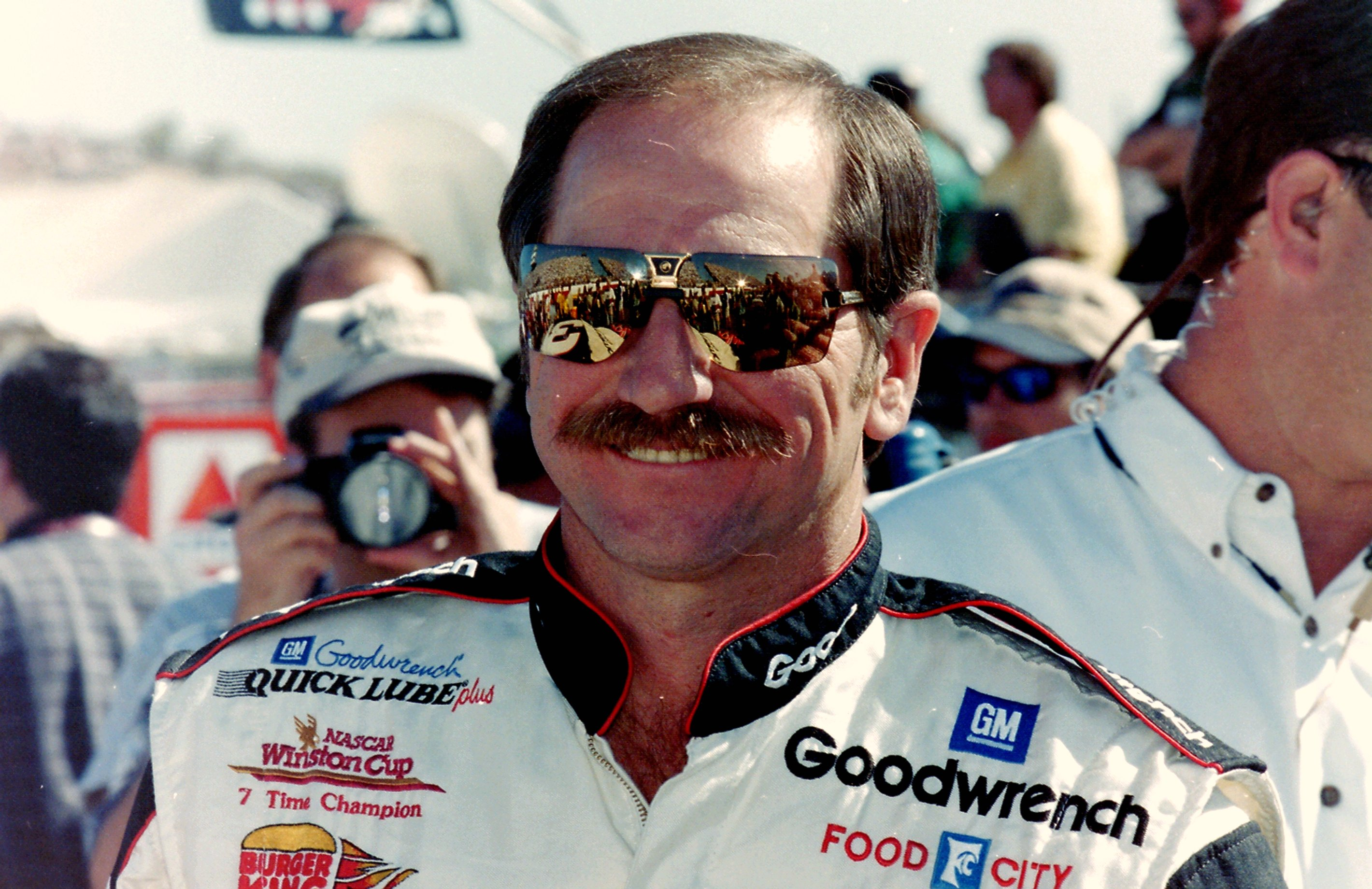
Earnhardt before the 1998 Dura Lube/Kmart 500 at Phoenix International Raceway.

The docuseries chronicles the life and racing career of Dale Earnhardt, a seven-time NASCAR Cup Series champion, utilizing rare archival footage and interviews with his family, competitors, and close friends. The series explores his rise up the ranks in NASCAR, his personal relationships, and his legacy following his death in the 2001 Daytona 500.

== Cast ==
- Dale Earnhardt — himself (archival footage)
- Dale Earnhardt Jr. — himself
- Kelley Earnhardt Miller — herself
- Cathy Earnhardt Watkins — herself
- Richard Childress — himself
- Darrell Waltrip — himself
- Hank Parker — himself
- Kyle Petty — himself
- Doug Richert — himself
- David Allen — himself

== Episodes ==
Episodes of Earnhardt
No.	Title	Directed by	Original release date
1	"Ironhead"	Joshua Altman	May 22, 2025
Dale Earnhardt rockets to stardom on NASCAR's biggest stage, winning a championship in just his second season. His upbringing in his family's racing heritage helps explain his determination, while challenges on and off the track threaten his future. Earnhardt and emerging team owner Richard Childress work to build a path to the top.
2	"The Intimidator"	Joshua Altman	May 22, 2025
Earnhardt develops his résumé as "The Intimidator" while chasing Richard Petty's record of seven Winston Cup titles. As his fame grows, the demands the sport strain his relationships, while the sport's dangers end up hitting close to home.
3	"One Tough Customer"	Joshua Altman	May 29, 2025
Earnhardt's fame and fortune reach new heights as he seeks his eighth title and his first Daytona 500 victory. Younger drivers begin challenging his spot, while his children begin pursuing racing careers of their own.
4	"Dale"	Joshua Altman	May 29, 2025
Earnhardt and son, Dale Earnhardt Jr., race together in the 2001 Daytona 500, leading the field in a defining moment for the family, leaving a lasting impact on the sport for years to come.

== Production and release ==
The series was first announced on May 14, 2024, with Deadline Hollywood reporting that the series had just been given the greenlight by Amazon. This move coincided with the announcement of Dale Earnhardt Jr.'s move to the Amazon Prime Video booth in the NASCAR Cup Series for the 2025 season.

Earnhardt was produced by Imagine Documentaries, NASCAR Studios, and Everyone Else, in partnership with Dirty Mo Media. The four-part series was directed by Joshua Altman, with Brian Grazer, Ron Howard, Sara Bernstein, Christopher St. John, Justin Wilkes, T. J. Martin and Daniel Lindsay serving as executive producers.

Production of the series incorporated archival footage from NASCAR's historical collection as well as personal materials provided by the Earnhardt family. The production crew were given access to approximately 15 petabytes of archival material from NASCAR, in addition to family footage and interviews to construct the project.

On April 25, 2025, Amazon Prime Video announced the series would premiere on May 22. The first two episodes were released on May 22 as announced, followed by the remaining two a week later on May 29. The release coincided with Prime Video's inaugural coverage of the NASCAR Cup Series, beginning with the 2025 Coca-Cola 600 at Charlotte Motor Speedway on May 25.

== Reception ==
=== Critical response ===
Earnhardt received positive reviews from critics. On review aggregator Rotten Tomatoes, the series received three reviews.

Writing for Car and Driver, Elana Scherr praised the documentary's exploration of Earnhardt's relationships, and interviews with his children, which she considered central to distinguishing the series from previous projects surrounding the driver. Similarly, Mark Vaughn of Autoweek praised the series for examining his family relationships and personal struggles that extended beyond motorsports.

Nick DeGroot for Motorsport.com praised the series for presenting a more complete and put together portrayal of Earnhardt, emphasizing its examination of the individual behind his public persona rather than just the reputation he had built. Decider's Scott Hines also recommended the series, praising its balance of racing footage and interviews, as well as its accessibility to audiences unfamiliar with the sport.

== Soundtrack ==
No.	Title	Writer(s)	Artist	Length
1.	"Ride Away"	Roy Orbison; Bill Dees	Roy Orbison	3:28
2.	"Strychnine"	Gerry Roslie	The Sonics	2:13
3.	"Workin' Man Blues"	Merle Haggard	Merle Haggard and The Strangers	2:33
4.	"Asphalt Cowboy"	Clark Bentley; Lawton Williams	Sleepy LaBeef	2:45
5.	"Stumbling Block Blues"	Champion Jack Dupree	Champion Jack Dupree	2:45
6.	"Gimme Back My Bullets"	Gary Rossington; Ronnie Van Zant	Lynyrd Skynyrd	3:28
7.	"Gonna Raise Hell"	Rick Nielsen	Cheap Trick	9:20
8.	"Ace of Spades"	"Fast" Eddie Clarke; Lemmy; Phil Taylor	Motörhead	2:48
9.	"Call Me the Breeze"	J.J. Cale	J.J. Cale	2:37
10.	"In 'n' Out of Grace"	Mark Arm; Steve Turner	Mudhoney	5:28
11.	"I Need a Little Oven (Instrumental)"	Stanley Zabka	Stan Zabka Orchestra	2:29
12.	"Hands on the Wheel"	Bill Callery	Willie Nelson	4:22
Total length:				44:16

== See also ==
- 3: The Dale Earnhardt Story (2004)
- Dale (2007)
- I Am Dale Earnhardt (2015)
- Unrivaled: Earnhardt vs. Gordon (2019)
