= 3: The Dale Earnhardt Story =

2004 television film directed by Russell Mulcahy

- Television release poster
- Genre: Biographical drama
- Written by: Robert Eisele
- Directed by: Russell Mulcahy
- Starring: Barry Pepper; J.K. Simmons; Elizabeth Mitchell; Sean Bridgers; Joe Chrest; Chad McCumbee; Greg Thompson; Kevin Stillwell; Ron Prather
- Music by: Louis Febre
- Country of origin: United States
- Original language: English

Production
- Executive producer: Orly Adelson
- Producer: Lynn Raynor
- Cinematography: James Chressanthis
- Editor: William B. Stich
- Running time: 90 minutes
- Production companies: Orly Adelson Productions; ESPN Original Entertainment

Original release
- Network: ESPN
- Release: December 11, 2004

3: The Dale Earnhardt Story is a 2004 American biographical drama television film directed by Russell Mulcahy, written by Robert Eisele, and starring Barry Pepper as NASCAR driver Dale Earnhardt. It chronicles Earnhardt's life from his humble upbringing in Kannapolis, North Carolina, throughout his career racing automobiles to include his rise to dominance in NASCAR, culminating with his death in the final lap of the 2001 Daytona 500. Its central theme focuses on the relationship between him and his father, Ralph Earnhardt, as well as the relationship between him and his youngest son, Dale Earnhardt Jr.

The film premiered on ESPN on December 11, 2004. Pepper's performance earned him a nomination for a Screen Actors Guild Award for Outstanding Performance by a Male Actor in a Miniseries or Television Movie.

Many of the film's race scenes were filmed at Rockingham Speedway. The track had lost its races and at the time was used mostly as a test facility and driving school. Chad McCumbee, who portrayed Earnhardt Jr., later became a NASCAR driver in the Craftsman Truck Series. He also raced alongside Dale Jr. himself at the 2007 Pocono 500, driving Kyle Petty's 45 car, as Petty was in the TNT broadcast booth.

Actors playing the part of the Flying Aces were Ray Everett, Greg Davis, David Brooks, Robbie Hicks, and Don Gyr.

== Synopsis ==
The film details the life of stock-car racing legend Dale Earnhardt. From an early age, Earnhardt learned about cars from his father Ralph, who worked at a mill to feed and clothe his family but also rebuilt jalopies in his garage and raced them at local events on weekends. Ralph, a minor legend in Southern stock-car racing, inspired Dale to follow his own passion for racing. After dropping out of high school to race, Dale started out in his father's shadow and struggled to establish himself for more than a decade, especially when tangling with legends in the sport such as Darrell Waltrip. Dale finally broke into NASCAR in the late '70s, and in time became the top prize money winner in NASCAR history. The lessons Dale learned from his father are revisited when Dale's own teenage son, Dale Jr., decides to take up racing at the age of 16.

== Cast ==
Cast Member	Role
Barry Pepper	Dale Earnhardt
Elizabeth Mitchell	Teresa Earnhardt
Ernest Whitted	Pit Crowd
Andrea Powell	Martha Earnhardt
Sean Bridgers	Neil Bonnett
David Lewis Brooks	Earnhardt Pit Crew
Russell Brooks	Earnhardt Pit Crew (credited as Russell Dean Brooks Jr.)
Joe Chrest	Jake Elder
Russell Cook	Press Conference VIP
Teresa Delgado	Kelley Earnhardt
Tony Devon	Will
Thunderbird Dinwiddie	Connie (credited as Traci Dinwiddie)
Tricia Dyar	Daisy (credited as Tricia Quattlebaum)
Corri English	Kelley Earnhardt
Michael Flippo	Wayne Robertson
Daniel Freeze	Dale Pit Crew
Frank Glidden	Kerry Earnhardt
Craig S. Harper	Kenny Schrader
Andy Hillenburg	Deke
Kenneth M. Johnston	Darrell Waltrip Pit Crew Member
Jim Keisler	GM Executive
Andrea Kfoury	Marion
James G. Martin Jr.	Dwayne
Chad McCumbee	Dale Earnhardt Jr.
Marshal McGee	Dale Earnhardt Jr.
Ron Prather	Richard Childress
Brandi Ryans	Brenda Gee
David Sherrill	H.A. "Humpy" Wheeler
Lori Beth Sikes	Latane Brown (credited as Lori Beth Edgeman)
J. K. Simmons	Ralph Earnhardt
Zachary Dylan Smith	Dale Earnhardt Jr.
Kevin Stillwell	Rod Osterlund
Greg Thompson	Darrell Waltrip
Olivia Weston	Dale's Mistress
David Wilson	GM Executive
Meredith DiPaolo Stephens	Driver's Wife (uncredited)

== Copyright infringement controversy ==
The script of this film was not approved by Earnhardt's widow, Teresa Earnhardt. The film, although capturing the essence of Earnhardt, is inaccurate in many of the events seen in it. As an example, the film depicts Earnhardt beginning his permanent relationship with his long time car owner Richard Childress immediately after leaving the #2 once Jim Stacy purchased the team; while Earnhardt did join with Childress after leaving Stacy, he spent the subsequent two seasons driving the #15 for Bud Moore Engineering before rejoining Childress to drive the #3.

Childress also sued ESPN for copyright infringement with its use of the "3" logo. In December 2005, the lawsuit was settled out of court.

== See also ==
- Dale (2007)
- I Am Dale Earnhardt (2015)
- Unrivaled: Earnhardt vs. Gordon (2019)
- Earnhardt (2025)
